= Westlake Shopping Center =

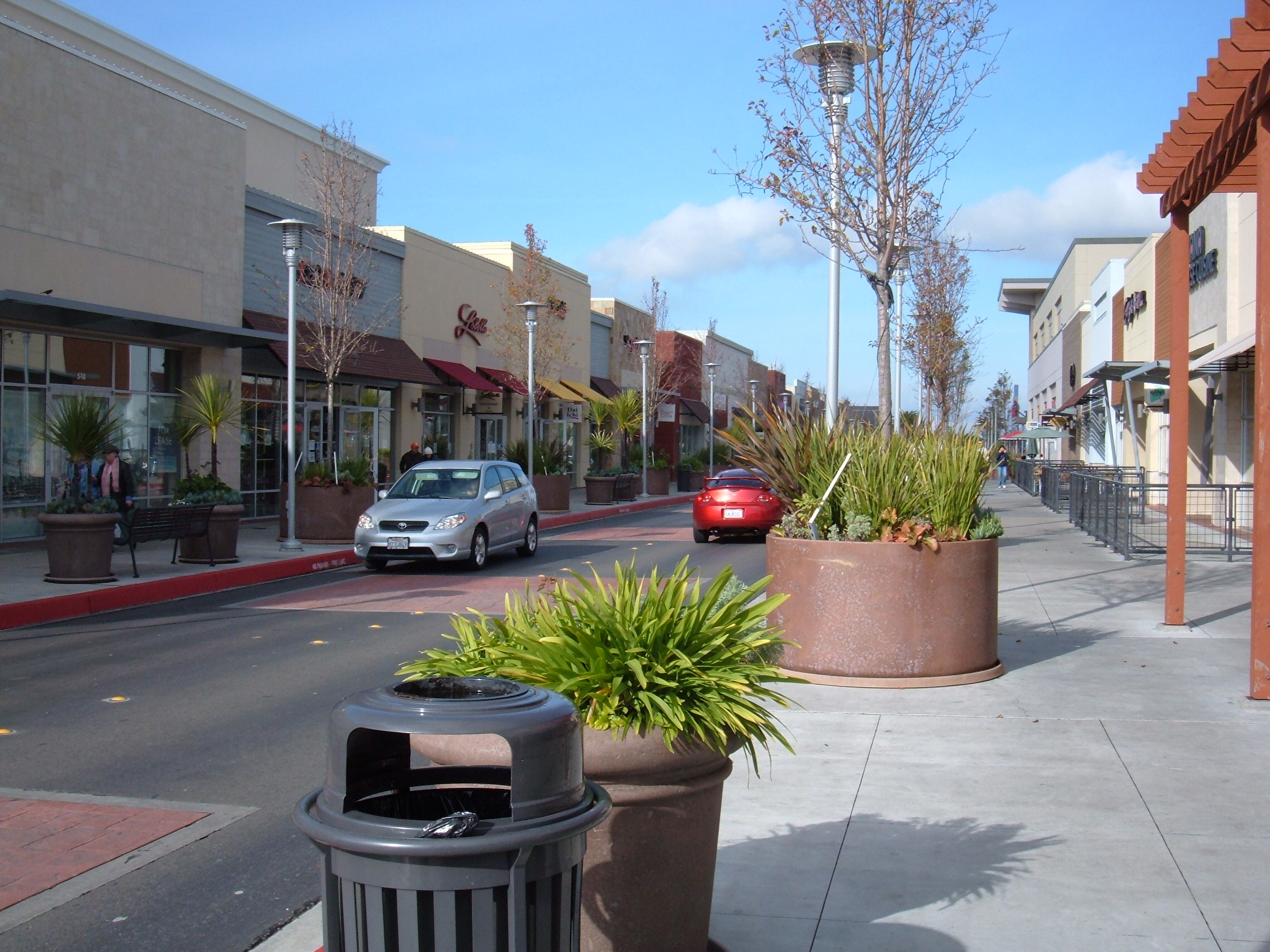
- Location: Daly City, CA, U.S.
- Coordinates: 37.69779°N 122.48211°W
- Opened: April 20, 1951
- Developer: Henry Doelger
- Manager: Kimco Realty Corporation
- Owner: Kimco Realty Corporation
- Num. of stores: 98
- Num. of anchor tenants: 5
- Floor area: 613,006 square feet (56,950.1 m^{2})
- Floors: 1
- Parking: 1,800 spaces
- Website: Westlake Shopping Center Website

Westlake Shopping Center is one of the first shopping malls built in America; ground was broken in 1948 for the mall in Daly City, California, United States. It is anchored by Burlington Coat Factory, Home Depot, Ross Stores, Safeway, Target, and Walgreens.

== History ==
In 1945, developer Henry Doelger purchased 1,350 acres (550 ha) of land in San Mateo County just south of San Francisco; the tracts had previously been used for hog and cabbage farming. Over the next twenty years, Doelger would go on to develop the area into the Westlake neighborhood of Daly City, including the 40-acre (16 ha) shopping center, originally named Westlake Town & Country Shopping Center, in the center of the tract. Doelger broke ground on the Westlake development in 1949; the groundbreaking ceremony for the shopping center was held in March 1949. The uniform appearance of the planned community (notorious for its racial restrictions) inspired singer Malvina Reynolds to write the song "Little Boxes" in 1962.

Westlake opened on April 20, 1951, making it one of the earliest malls in America; at the time, its 3,000-car parking area was the largest in America. It was also the first community shopping center in the Bay Area. Its open-air pedestrian promenades allowed the center to be used for outdoor concerts, art shows, fairs, dances, and other community events for many years.

Doelger sold the Westlake Shopping Center in 1965. Westlake was subsequently purchased by the Westlake Development Company in 1972, who later sold it to its current owners, Kimco Realty Corporation, on October 22, 2002.

In 2017 Kimco announced plans to add apartments above ground-level retail at Westlake. Under those plans, a 6-story mixed-use building with 179 apartments on the upper floors would replace an existing 2-story commercial building and a 60-space parking lot; underground parking would be provided for 260 cars. The proposed mixed-use building would replace the existing northeast corner of the Westlake site, near the intersection of John Daly Boulevard and Park Plaza Drive. The developer has received permission for this plan.

In 2018, it was announced that Kimco has plans to work to develop in housing at Daly City.

== Design ==
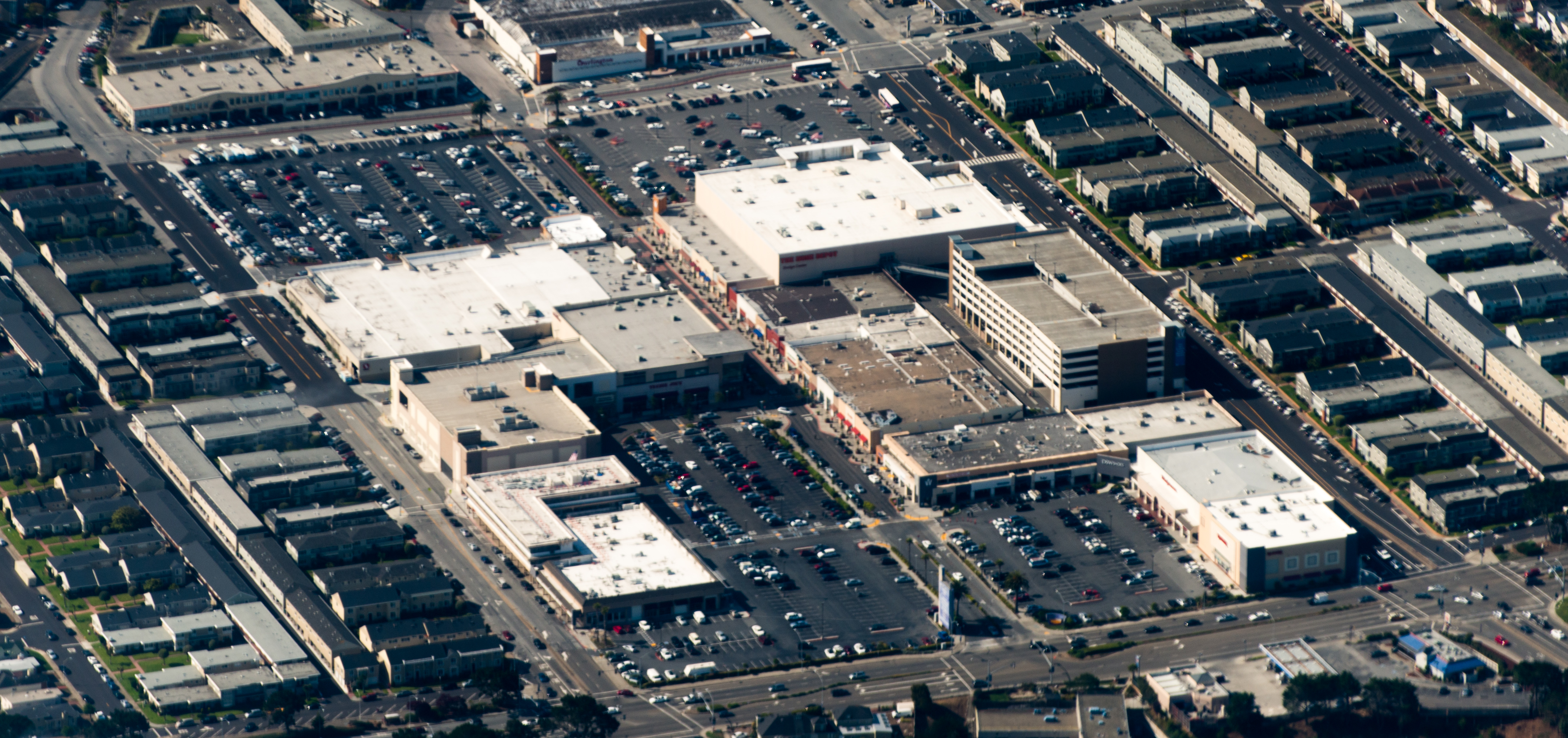
Aerial view of Westlake Shopping Center from north, with Trader Joe's on left and Home Depot on right.

Westlake Shopping Center occupies the super-block bounded by John Daly Boulevard (on the north), Park Plaza Drive (on the east), Southgate Avenue (on the south), and Lake Merced Boulevard (on the west); it also encompasses the retail/business properties on the south side of Southgate, extending west past Lake Merced Blvd.

=== Phase I renovation ===
Westlake was renovated starting in 2004; Kimco have used the site to test programs to build consumer traffic, including offering Wi-Fi and electric vehicle charging stations on-site. The J.C. Penney building was demolished in 2005 and a Home Depot store was constructed on its old site. In addition, a Cost Plus World Market opened in a new building in the center of the mall. Phase I involved relocation and enlargement of the Trader Joe's. Phase I will involve demolition of 173,032 square feet (16,075.2 m^{2}) of retail space, construction of approximately 194,419 sq ft (18,062 m^{2}) of new retail development, and the removal of 96 parking spaces, resulting in 21,387 sq ft (1,987 m^{2}) of net new development and a 5 percent reduction of parking stalls. The decor was modified to give the mall's center strip a Main Street look.

=== Phase II renovation ===
Phase II involves construction of 96,005 sq ft (8,919 m^{2}) of new retail uses, including construction of a 30,000 sq ft (3,000 m^{2}) second floor addition to the existing one-story retail building. Phase II also involves construction of a 160,666-square-foot (14,926 m^{2}) parking garage, construction of necessary public improvements, relocation of utilities in the shopping center, and upgrading pedestrian walkways and vehicle facilities.

== Anchors ==
- Burlington Coat Factory
- Ross
- The Home Depot
- Safeway
- Walgreens

The original Westlake Shopping center featured J. C. Penney and Woolworth as its anchor stores.
