= Tract housing =

Type of housing development

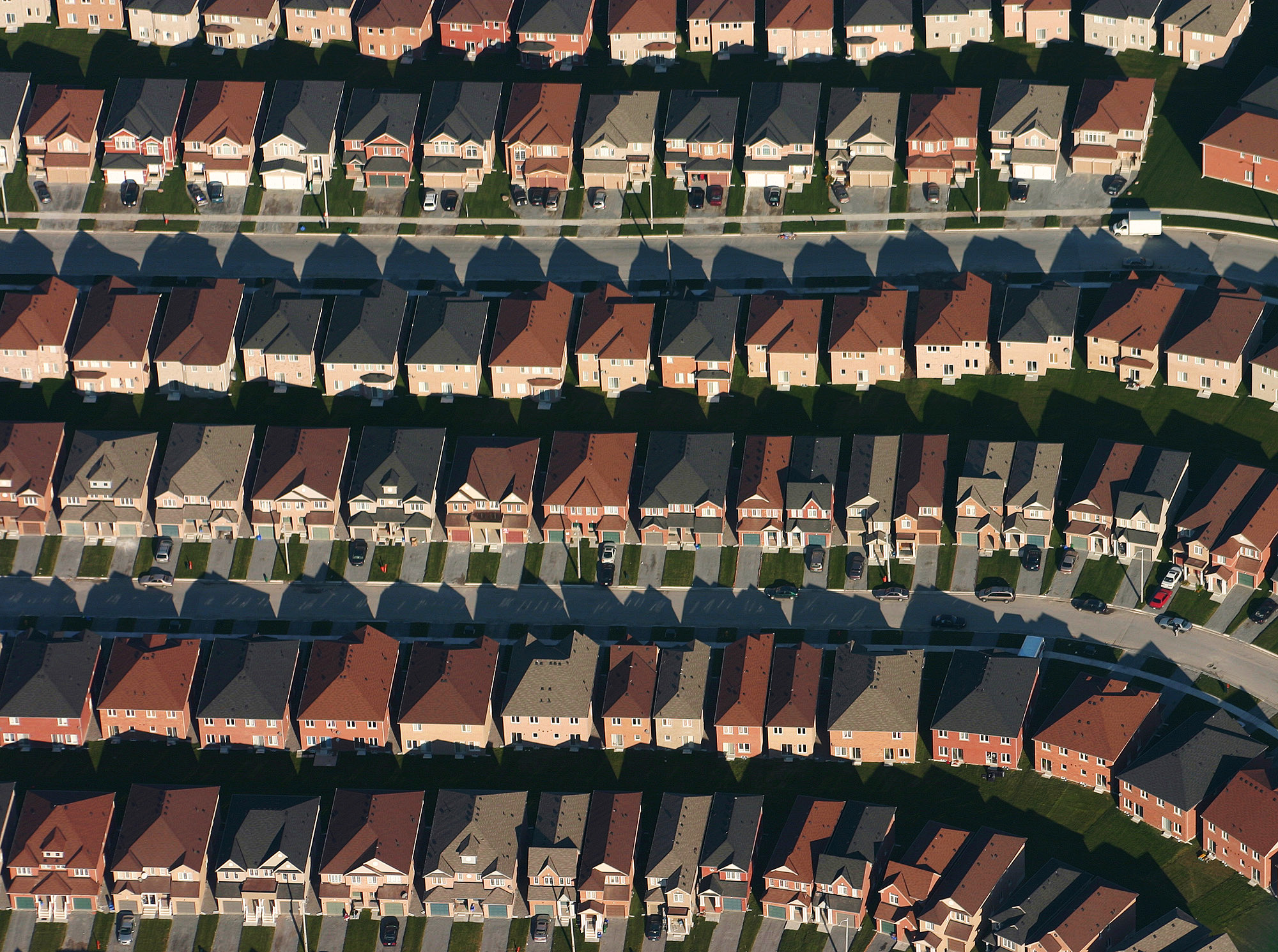
Aerial view of housing developments near Markham, Ontario, Canada

Tract housing, sometimes informally known as cookie cutter housing, is a type of housing development in which multiple similar houses are built on a tract (area) of land that is subdivided into smaller lots. Tract housing developments are found in suburb developments that were modeled on the "Levittown" concept and sometimes encompass large areas of dozens of square miles.

== Design ==
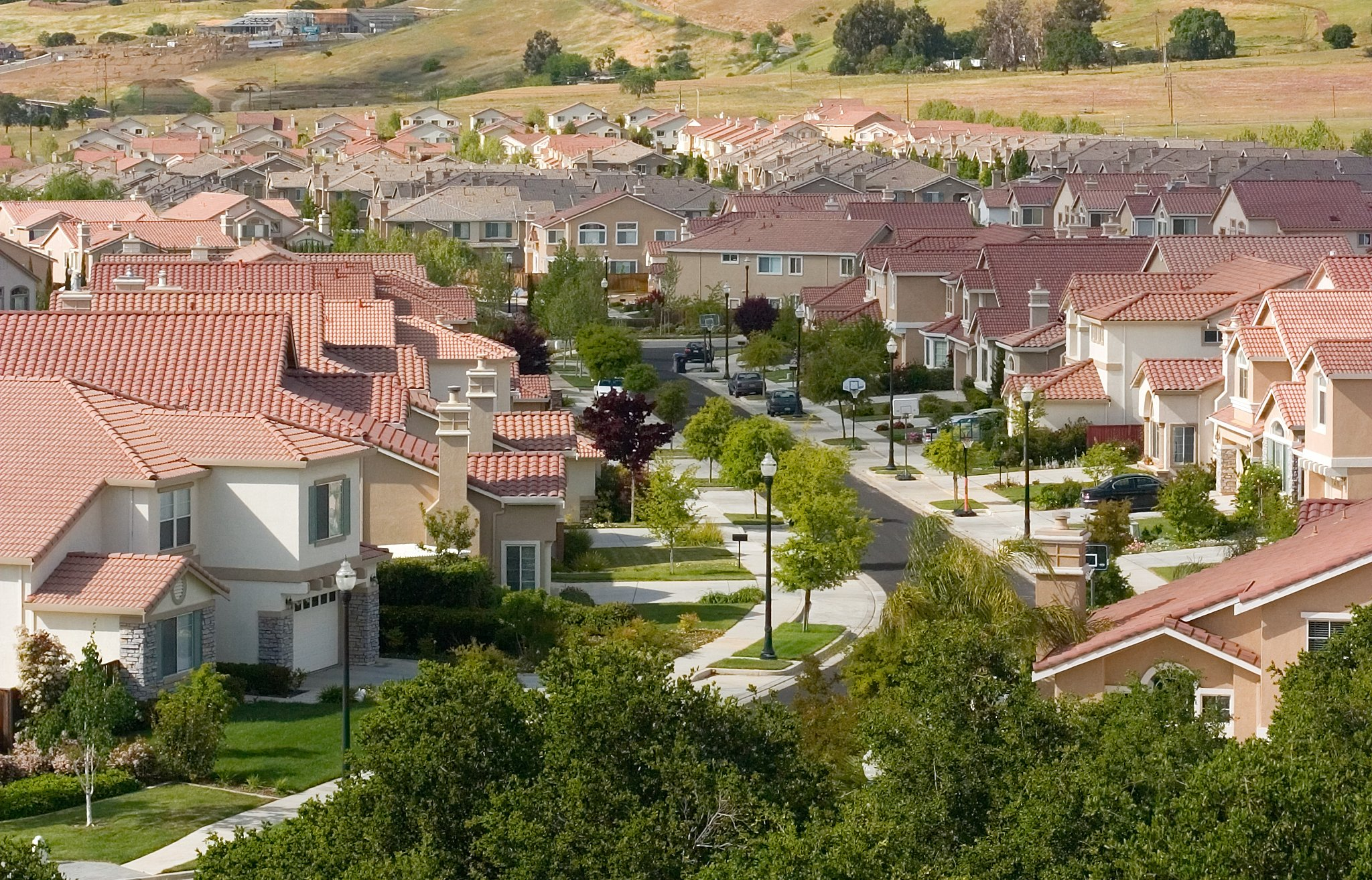
A tract housing development in San Jose, California

Tract housing came about in the 1940s when the demand for cheap housing skyrocketed. Economies of scale meant that large numbers of identical houses could be built in a "cookie cutter" fashion faster and more cheaply to fulfill the growing demand. Developers would purchase a dozen or more adjacent lots and conduct the building construction as an assembly-line process.

Tract housing development makes use of few architectural designs, and labor costs are reduced because workers need to learn the skills and movements of constructing only those designs rather than repeat the learning curve. In addition, as all houses in the development will be built at the same time, the cost of purchasing and transporting building supplies may be reduced due to economies of scale. Components such as roof trusses, plumbing, and stair systems are often prefabricated in factories and installed on-site. This allows builders to offer lower prices, which in turn can make houses affordable to a larger percentage of the population. Early tract houses were often identical, but many tracts since the late 20th century have several designs and other variations in footprint, roof form, and materials, along with options such as garage bays, for a more diverse appearance.

== Suburbs ==
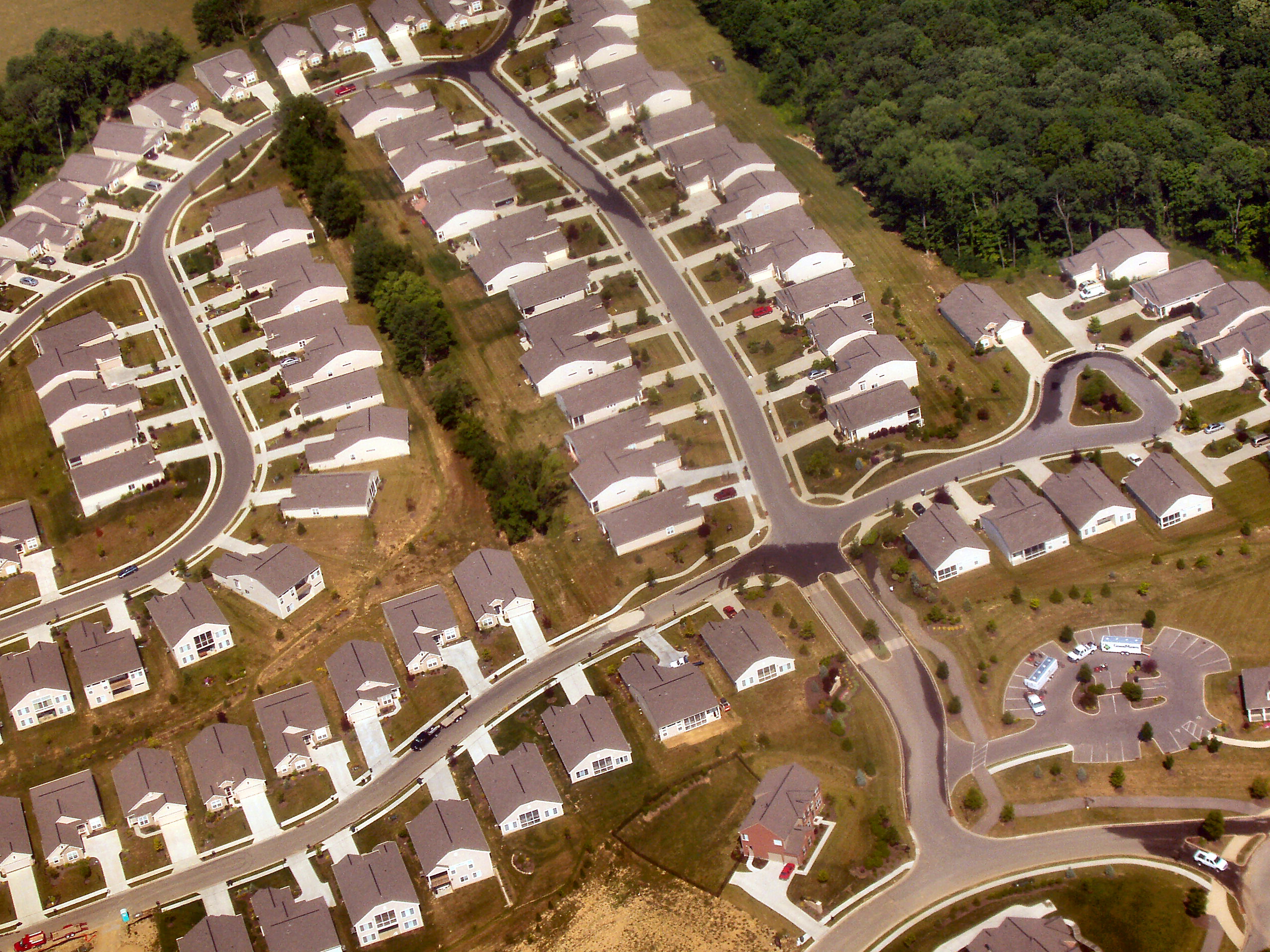
Tract housing in Cincinnati, Ohio

The concept of tract housing is occasionally mocked in North American and British popular culture as the basis of suburbia; notable examples are the songs "Little Boxes" by Malvina Reynolds, "Suburbia" by the Pet Shop Boys and "Subdivisions" by Rush. It is also often criticized by city planners and architects, as its construction tends to overlook required elements of successful community building, instead creating a homogeneous residential neighbourhood with no walkability, local employment, commerce, services, or attractions within close commuting distance. This leads to a heavy reliance on automobile travel, as residents are unable to address any of these needs locally.

== See also ==
- Exurb
- Housing estate
- List of house styles
- List of house types
- Railroad apartment
- Row house
