= Little Boxes =

Song by Malvina Reynolds, popularized by Pete Seeger

Song by Pete Seeger
- Released: 1963
- Songwriter: Malvina Reynolds

Official audio
- "Little Boxes" on Youtube

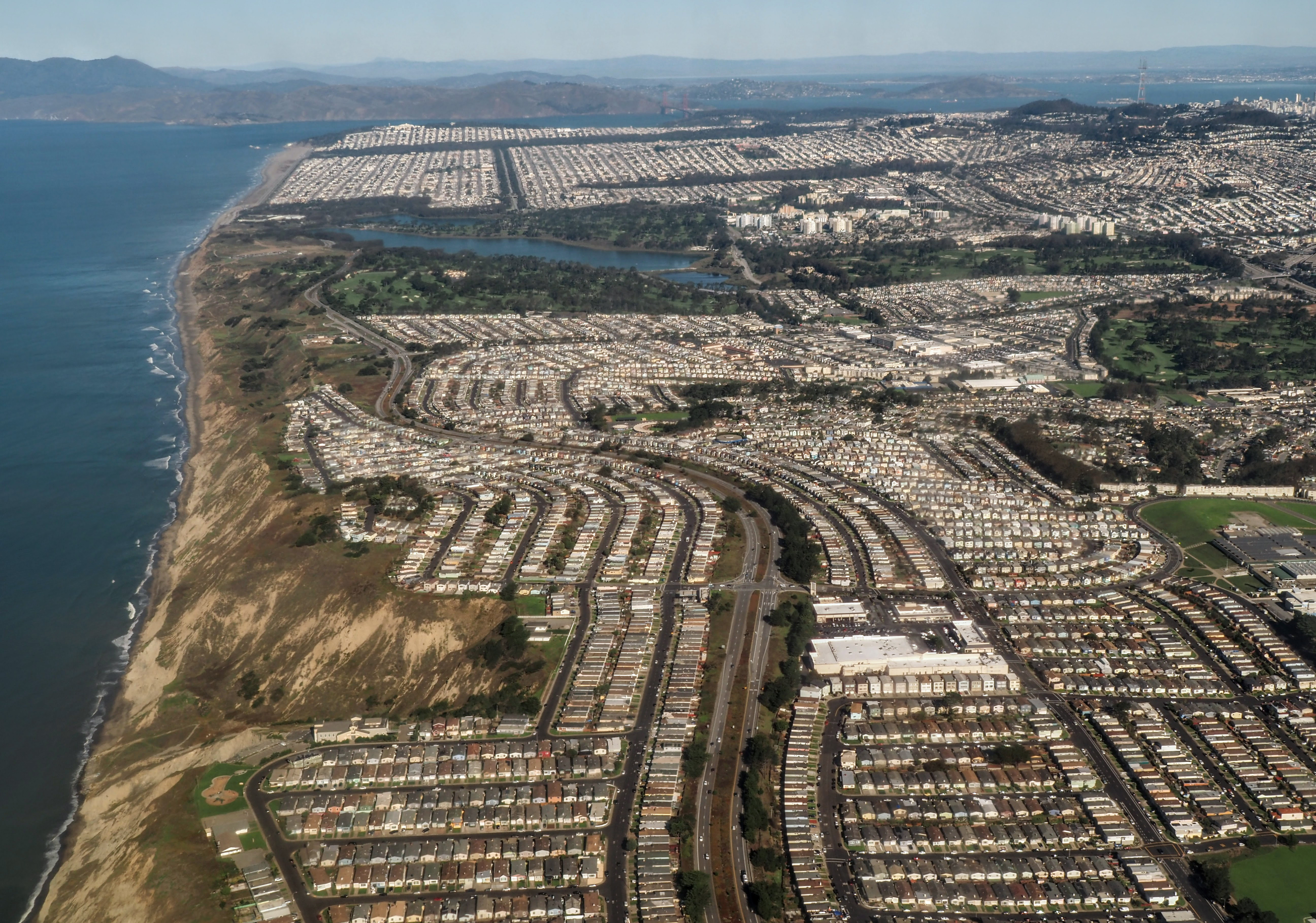
Aerial view of tract housing in Daly City, California, a suburb of San Francisco, which inspired Reynolds to write the song

"Little Boxes" is a song written and composed by Malvina Reynolds in 1962. The song was first released by her friend, Pete Seeger, in 1963, and became his only charting single in January 1964.

The song is a social satire about the development of suburbia and associated conformist middle-class attitudes. It mocks suburban tract housing as "little boxes" of different colors "all made out of ticky-tacky" and which "all look just the same". "Ticky-tacky" is a reference to the inferior material often used in the construction of tract houses.

== Background ==
Reynolds was a folk singer-songwriter and political activist in the 1960s and 1970s. Nancy Reynolds, her daughter, explained that her mother wrote the song after seeing the housing developments around Daly City, California, built in the post-war era by Henry Doelger, particularly the neighborhood of Southern Hills in Daly City, California on the north side of San Bruno Mountain:

My mother and father were driving South from San Francisco through Daly City when my mom got the idea for the song. She asked my dad to take the wheel, and she wrote it on the way to the gathering in La Honda where she was going to sing for the Friends Committee on Legislation. When Time magazine (I think, maybe Newsweek) wanted a photo of her pointing to the very place, she couldn't find those houses because so many more had been built around them that the hillsides were totally covered.

Reynolds later released her version on her 1967 Columbia Records album Malvina Reynolds Sings the Truth, and it can also be found on the Smithsonian Folkways Records 2000 CD re-issue of Ear to the Ground. However, Pete Seeger's 1963 rendition of the song is known internationally, and it reached No. 70 in the Billboard Hot 100 in January 1964, his sole charting single. Also a political activist, Seeger was a friend of Reynolds, and, like many others in the 1960s, he used folk songs as a medium for social protest.

== Reception and analysis ==
The effectiveness of the satire was attested to by a university professor quoted in 1964 in Time magazine as saying, "I've been lecturing my classes about middle-class conformity for a whole semester. Here's a song that says it all in 1 1/2 minutes." However, according to Christopher Hitchens, satirist Tom Lehrer described "Little Boxes" as "the most sanctimonious song ever written".

Historian Nell Irvin Painter points out that the conformity described in "Little Boxes" was not entirely a bad thing, indicative as it was of "a process of going to university to be doctors and lawyers and business executives" who "came out all the same" and then lived in "nice, new neighborhoods with good new schools. ... Suburbia may be monotone, but it was a sameness to be striven toward."

The term "ticky-tacky" became a catchphrase during the 1960s, attesting to the song's popularity.

== Covers ==
The song has been recorded by many musicians and bands, some of whom have arranged and translated the song to meet their styles. Perhaps one of the most well-known covers is by The Womenfolk, whose 1964 version of the song was (until 2016) the shortest single to chart on the Billboard Hot 100, at 1 minute 1 second, peaking at No. 83. Spanish songwriter Adolfo Celdrán wrote the first Spanish version of the song, called "Cajitas", which was released in 1969 and had several successive reissues. Another Spanish version of the song, "Las Casitas del Barrio Alto", was written by the Chilean songwriter Víctor Jara in 1971, depicting in a mocking way the over-Europeanized and bourgeois lifestyle of the residents of the "Barrio Alto" (high-class neighborhood) in Santiago de Chile.

== In popular culture ==
- 1964: The song was performed on the NBC satirical television program That Was the Week That Was on April 13, 1964, sung by Nancy Ames and accompanied by a film montage by Guy Fraumeni and Lou Myers depicting tract housing and other related images.
- 1975: In the novel Ecotopia by Ernest Callenbach, describing a secessionist ecological utopia in the western United States, the protagonist (visiting the country as a US journalist) is informed that "cheaply built houses in newer districts" are scornfully referred to as "ticky-tacky boxes" by the population.
- 1980s: Russ Abbot took the music to the song and its general theme to satirize The Spinners, a contemporary popular folk group whose songs apparently "all sound the same", as a parody act "The Spanners" on his 1980s London Weekend Television Madhouse series.
- 2005–2012: The song was used as the opening theme song for the Showtime television series Weeds. The first season used Reynolds's version. In the second and third seasons, various artists and celebrities performed covers of the song for the different episodes. The song was not used regularly during seasons four through seven, but was covered by various artists in the eighth and final season. See also: opening music of Weeds.
- 2005: The song is sung by both Keith Carradine (as "Elton Tripp") and Kate Mara (as "Zoe Tripp") in the film The Californians.
- 2006: A book about Westlake, Daly City, California, Little Boxes: The Architecture of a Classic Midcentury Suburb, is named for the song.
- 2013: A re-worded version of the song, written by Sniffy Dog, was used in a UK TV commercial for mobile telephone operator O2. Three versions are known to have been broadcast: one sung by Adrienne Stiefel and another by Jedd Holden, while the third is an instrumental version.
- 2014: A variation of "Little Boxes" appears in the film The Boxtrolls, performed by the band Loch Lomond.
- 2019: A remixed portion of "Little Boxes" appears in the trailer for the film Escape Room, and its tune is used in the film.

== See also ==
- Love It Like a Fool (1977 documentary about Reynolds)
- "Pittsburgh, Pennsylvania", Bob Merrill's 1952 song, that uses a similar but not identical tune
- Suburb
- Urban sprawl
