= The Roving Kind (song) =

Single by Guy Mitchell
- A-side: "My Heart Cries for You"
- Released: 1950
- Genre: Pop
- Length: 3:02
- Songwriter(s): Jessie Cavanaugh, Arnold Stanton

Guy Mitchell singles chronology
"The Roving Kind" (1950)	"You're Just in Love" (1951)

The Roving Kind is a 1950 popular song by Jessie Cavanaugh and Arnold Stanton, both pseudonyms used by music publisher The Richmond Organisation. It was adapted from a British folk song, "The Pirate Ship". "The Roving Kind" is about a girl who is nice but a wanderer.

The best-known version was recorded by Guy Mitchell in 1950, which reached No. 4 on Billboard in December 1950. The single also reached No. 6 on the Cashbox charts the same month.

The song had first been recorded by the American folk group, The Weavers. Mitchell's jocular version followed the original sea-shanty style. Columbia's A&R director Mitch Miller followed this "folk-origin" formula for most of Mitchell's subsequent hits.
