= My Truly, Truly Fair =

Single by Guy Mitchell and Mitch Miller

from the album Guy's Greatest Hits
- B-side: "Who Knows Love"
- Released: 1951
- Recorded: 1951
- Genre: Pop
- Length: 2:45
- Label: Columbia
- Songwriter(s): Bob Merrill

Guy Mitchell and Mitch Miller singles chronology
"Unless" (1951)	"My Truly, Truly Fair" (1951)	"Belle Belle My Liberty Belle" (1951)

"My Truly, Truly Fair" is a popular song written by Bob Merrill. It was published in 1951. The song was one of a number of Bob Merrill songs popularized by Guy Mitchell. Mitchell recorded it with Mitch Miller and his orchestra on April 30, 1951. The song was released by Columbia Records as catalog number 39415. It reached a peak position of number 2 on the Billboard chart.

The recording by Vic Damone was released by Mercury Records as catalog number 5646. It first reached the Billboard Best Seller chart on June 1, 1951 and lasted eight weeks on the chart, peaking at number 18. According to some sources, the song reached number 4 on the Billboard chart. This higher position was taken by the Most Played by Disc Jockeys chart.

Alberto Semprini, on piano with rhythm accompaniment, recorded it as the second song of the medley "Part 2. Hit Medley of Slow Foxtrosts" along with "By the Kissing Rock" and "Ivor Rag." It was released by EMI on their His Master's Voice label as catalog number B 10123.

Tommy Dorsey also recorded the song for the Standard Transcriptions Library.

A French version called "Ma Petite Folie" was one of the earliest successes of Line Renaud, one of the all-time most popular singers in France.

The accompanying tune to the song was also copied by a Japanese song, "Sukiyaki", recorded by Kyu Sakamoto which, in 1963, became the first Japanese song to top the US charts. There was another 1951 version recorded in the UK by Dick James and The Stargazers.
