= A Diamond Guitar =

- Short story by Truman Capote
- Country: United States
- Language: English
- Genre: Southern literature

Publication
- Published in: Harper's Bazaar (volume 84, part 2)
- Publication type: Magazine
- Publisher: Hearst Corporation
- Media type: Print
- Publication date: 1950

"A Diamond Guitar" is a short story by Truman Capote, first published in Harper's Bazaar in 1950; it is noted as one of his better quality early short stories. The title refers to the prize possession of the younger man, a rhinestone-studded guitar; the guitar serves as the key image of the story.

Capote wrote "A Diamond Guitar" in April 1950 during a three-week-long transatlantic freighter crossing from New York to Italy.

It is one of three short stories normally published in the same volume as Breakfast at Tiffany's, first released in 1958.

== Plot summary ==
The story is set in a prison in a rural area near Mobile, Alabama where convicts perform road work and farm turpentine from nearby pine forests. The two main characters are both convicts, Mr. Schaeffer, an older man serving a ninety-nine year sentence for murder, and Tico Feo, a newly arrived young man sentenced to serve two years for stabbing two men. Mr. Schaeffer and Tico form a fast bond that is simultaneously intimate and platonic. On Valentine's Day they agree to attempt an escape during the following day's work. Tico succeeds in getting away, but Mr. Schaeffer breaks his ankle in a shallow creek. Tico betrays Mr. Schaeffer's affections by not coming to his aid, but Mr. Schaeffer is given credit for trying to capture Tico and takes possession of the prized guitar.

== Characters ==
Armstrong: the youngest prison guard. He is overweight, but surprisingly quick.

Mr. Schaeffer: a fifty-year-old man who is one of the few literate prisoners, as such he is looked up to and feared by other prisoners. He has graying red hair and is lean in build. He is comparable to Holly Golightly in Breakfast at Tiffany's because, like Holly, he is a dreamer.

Tico Feo: a lively eighteen-year-old man from Cuba, who has blonde hair and blue eyes. At times he is lazy, and known for being a terrible liar. His character has been compared to the murderer Perry Smith from Capote's famous later novel In Cold Blood who possesses a Gibson guitar.

== Critical reception and analysis ==
The short story's literary style has been studied for its clear use of literary devices, most notably those of heightened language, metaphorical descriptions and its in medias res opening.

The story has been noted as having "faint echoes" of Carson McCullers' work. Another contemporary of Capote's, Donald Windham, gave Capote a copy of his 1950 novel The Dog Star and believes it influenced elements of "A Diamond Guitar", excluding the events and characters. A modern short story scholar notes that many of Capote's early short stories, including "A Diamond Guitar" place him among a cadre of notable mid-century writers well-versed in the southern gothic genre, including William Faulkner, Carson McCullers, Tennessee Williams and Flannery O'Connor.

Readers have noticed the undercurrent of homosexuality in two main characters' relationship. Helen Garson, a scholar, notes that this type of love is one that Capote treats very carefully, "find[ing] no room for humor, sexual or otherwise". Emmanuel S. Nelson notes that "A Diamond Guitar" is Capote's most openly gay short story and it is his only short story that "has a gay male relationship at its heart."
