= Feet Up (Pat Him on the Po-Po) =

Single by Guy Mitchell
- B-side: "Jenny Kissed Me"
- Released: August 1952
- Genre: Pop
- Length: 2:42
- Label: Columbia
- Songwriter: Bob Merrill

Guy Mitchell singles chronology
"Day of Jubilo" (1952)	"Feet Up (Pat Him on the Po-Po)" (1952)	"'Cause I Love You, That's a Why" (1952)

"Feet Up (Pat Him on the Po-Po)" is a popular song written by Bob Merrill in 1952. Its best-known version was recorded by Guy Mitchell in 1952. The song reached number 18 on the Cashbox chart in August 1952. The song also reached number 2 on the UK Singles Chart in November 1952, becoming the first number two record in that chart.

The narrator of the song is a former lowlife who is reforming so he can set a good example for his newborn son, whom he loves. The title refers to the tradition of spanking a newborn baby just after birth, to ensure it draws breath.

Alfie Sansom of Argus Far described the song as "tailor-made for a Fallout game, or a penny arcade in Morecambe."
