= Original Cast (record label) =

- Founded: 1975
- Founder: Bruce and Doris Yeko
- Genre: Musical theatre
- Country of origin: United States
- Location: Georgetown, Connecticut
- Official website: www.footlight.com

Original Cast Records is a record label based in Georgetown, Connecticut, that specializes in obscure theatre recordings, primarily cast albums from little-known Broadway, off-Broadway, off-off-Broadway and other stage productions, but also theatre-related film scores, cabaret, concert and solo artist recordings. It traces its origins back to 1975, when husband-and-wife theatre enthusiasts Bruce and Doris Yeko embarked on a venture "dedicated to the preserving of musicals that would not otherwise be recorded".

== Bruce and Doris Yeko ==
Born in Milwaukee, Bruce Yeko was fascinated by theatre from an early age. As he once told a journalist: “I had a friend who was an usher at the only theater in Milwaukee – he would let me in to see all the plays and musicals”. Later, he travelled to theaters in Chicago to see shows before they came to Milwaukee, and then, inevitably, moved on to New York. Yeko made his first pilgrimage to the city in 1962, when, after asking a policeman directions to Broadway, he saw a matinee of I Can Get It for You Wholesale and then an evening performance of Subways Are For Sleeping. After their marriage, Bruce and his wife Doris would travel from their home in Connecticut to New York (and beyond) to see four or five new musicals each week; by 1977, the couple could modestly claim that, over the previous twelve years, they had seen more musicals that anyone else in the world.

Bruce Yeko not only acquired Broadway cast albums but was, from the age of eight years, a keen collector of trading cards. He began selling them at age sixteen and then, after graduating from the University of Milwaukee and working as an accountant, he commenced full-time business as a trading card dealer at the age of 22 years. By the mid-1970s, Yeko claimed to have the largest collection of trading cards in the world, with twenty million items. His wife Doris became involved in the business, specialising in current trading cards while Bruce concentrated on the vintage ones. Their mail-order service, based in their home in Georgetown, also dealt in out-of-print recordings of stage musicals and film scores.

In 1975, the Yekos turned their attention to producing their own theatre recordings, concentrating on little-known or short-lived Broadway and off-Broadway productions that had little hope of gaining a mainstream record contract to produce an original cast album. Within only five years, it could be said of the couple that "their dedication to preserving musicals is so complete that Ben Bagley aptly calls them 'the musical theatre experts'."

== Development of Original Cast Records ==
=== 1976-78: Take Home Tunes and Broadway Baby ===
The Yekos' record label began modestly with the release an EP of songs from the off-Broadway musical The Robber Bridegroom, performed by a studio cast comprising Jerry Orbach and Virginia Vestoff. It was released under the Take Home Tunes label, with a catalogue number of 761. This simple numbering system, derived from the year of release plus a digit for each sequential album, would be used for several decades to come. This first EP was soon followed by Martin Charnin's Mini Album: 5 Great Songs from Not-So-Great Shows. This comprised excerpts from three stage musicals with lyrics by Martin Charnin, who was then best known as the lyricist for the smash-hit Annie. The five songs represented highlights from the scores of Mata Hari (music by Jerome Coopersmith), La Strada (music by Lionel Bart), and the unproduced Softly (music by Harold Arlen), as performed by Laurie Beechman, Robert Guillaume, Larry Kert, and Charnin himself.

The first LP to be produced by the Yekos was a recording of selections from the musical The Baker's Wife by Stephen Schwartz, which was then touring prior to a much-anticipated Broadway opening. After hearing about the show, the Yekos had travelled to Boston to see it and, impressed by its score, subsequently telephoned Schwartz to discuss a possible recording. Schwartz was enthusiastic, but his initial suggestion that a full cast album might be produced was beyond the reach of the fledgling producers. After the show closed (without making it to Broadway), the Yekos negotiated to record an LP of excerpts, with the composer himself choosing what he considered to be the best songs. The recording sessions took place in early 1977 in an apartment studio in Greenwich Village. However, the space was so small that the entire cast could not be present; consequently, Schwartz suggested that only the three principal cast members be involved. These comprised Paul Sorvino as the titular baker, a then-unknown Patti LuPone as his wife, and Kurt Peterson as her love interest. The completed album, comprising six solo numbers and five duets, received a Grammy nomination after its release in 1977.

At the same time, the Yekos produced and released an EP with some additional songs from the same show, performed by original cast member Paul Sorvino along with Darlene Conley, Denise Lor, and Portia Nelson (who were not in the touring production) and composer/lyricist Stephen Schwartz and his wife, Carol. This, incidentally, also represented the last time that the Yekos would release a vinyl recording in a 7-inch format.

Soon afterwards, the Yekos produced what they described as the world's first off-off-Broadway cast album: a recording of The Second Shepherd's Play by Steve Kitsakos (1977). They went on to release numerous other recordings that, because they involved members of the original productions, can strictly be considered as original cast albums. Examples included the two-hander revue 2, the Barn Theater production of Canada, and the Theatre Illustre production of Monsieur de Pourceaugnac. These last two LPs were released under the subsidiary label of Broadway Baby, although the same catalogue numbering system was maintained. The Yekos also continued to produce studio recordings of related material, including the memorable anthology LP Eighteen Interesting Songs from Unfortunate Shows, with rare songs from little-known and previously unrecorded shows by Harold Rome, Mary Rodgers, Jule Styne, Cole Porter, Jerry Bock, Sheldon Harnick, and others.

During this period, cast recordings were typically co-produced by both Bruce and Doris Yeko, and often the original composer of the show itself. Most of these early LPs were issued with sleeves designed by artist William F Krasnaborski, who either adapted original poster illustrations or came up with entirely new artwork of his own. Sleeve notes typically mentioned that the performance rights for the show in question could be obtained by contacting Doris Yeko, who had already developed a specific interest in the publishing side of musical theatre.

=== 1978-83: Original Cast, Filmscore and CYM ===
In 1978, the Yekos established the Original Cast Record Company, and subsequently used both the label name 'Original Cast', and the catalogue prefix OC, in subsequent releases. The first issue to reflect this change was an original cast recording of the off-Broadway revue Piano Bar.

During 1979, the Yekos embarked upon two new but related ventures: the CY Musical Foundation, which was, in their own words, "an educational and artistic wing for preserving, developing and promoting musicals", and a publishing arm (under the direction of Doris Chu Yeko) known as Broadway/Hollywood International Music Publishers, which sought to control the performing rights to lesser-known shows and make them available to a wider audience through the publication of sheet music and libretti. That same year, the couple released their first "film soundtrack" LP: a studio recording of songs from the film Movie Movie, written by Ralph Burns, Buster Davis, Larry Gelbart and Sheldon Keller. This was released under the auspices of a subsidiary label, Filmscore Records, although the catalogue number (7910) following the previous sequence established by Take Home Tunes/Broadway Baby. This LP, however, would be both the first and last issue on the Filmscore label.

Around the same time, the Yekos also began to expand their scope by providing a commercial release for non-commercial recordings that had been produced by others. The first of these was a re-pressing of a rare demonstration record of the ill-fated 1965 musical Kelly, with songs performed by the show's composer Mark 'Moose' Charlap and lyricist Eddie Lawrence. This was duly followed by the release of the original London cast recording of Flowers for Algernon, which had been privately co-produced by its composer, Charles Strouse and its star, Michael Crawford, after its premature closure on the West End in 1979.

Otherwise, the bulk of the couple's output still comprised cast recordings of current but under-rated Broadway and off-Broadway productions. Many of these were recorded after the production itself had closed, although original cast members were frequently recruited to reprise their roles on the album. In some cases, where a principal original cast member declined to participate, or was otherwise unavailable, a talented replacement was found, as when Paul Sorvino stepped in for Italian opera singer Cesare Siepi on a cast recording of Alan Jay Lerner's final show, Carmelina (1979). In an especially notable achievement, Bruce Yeko re-united most of the original cast of the notorious 1971 musical flop Prettybelle, including leading lady Angela Lansbury, to complete a studio recording in 1982.

After the Yekos divorced around 1981, Bruce continued the mail-order business in Connecticut, while Doris maintained the music publishing arm, based in New Jersey (and later, in Beverly Hills). Virtually all of the label's subsequent recordings were produced by Bruce alone, although Doris did produce two recordings herself in 1982 and 1983. These were released under her own label, the Chu Yeko Musical Foundation, which used the catalogue number prefix of CYM but otherwise maintained the numerical sequence followed by Original Cast.

The next few years saw a lull in output; in 1983, following the release of an original Broadway cast recording of the short-lived musical Oh Brother (which was recorded almost a year after the show closed in November 1981), there were evidently no new releases on the Original Cast label for five years.

=== 1988 onwards: Original Cast Records ===
In 1988, the drought was finally broken by the release of a studio recording of songs from Brian Gari's first musical Late Nite Comic, which had closed on Broadway in October 1987 after only four performances. This, however, also represented the last time that Original Cast would release an album in a 12-inch vinyl LP format.

The following year, Bruce Yeko embraced the new era of the compact disc by re-releasing what was his company's most popular album: the 1977 cast recording of The Baker's Wife. The re-issue included only those songs on the original LP; the additional songs from the EP were omitted because the master tapes had reportedly been mislaid. The label went on to produce CD re-issues of several other popular titles from its own back catalogue, often including bonus tracks such as previously unreleased composer's demos.

Since the early 1990s, Bruce Yeko has continued to release original cast recordings of contemporary musicals from Broadway, off-Broadway, off-off-Broadway, regional tours and beyond. Studio albums of previously unrecorded cult musicals from the 1950s and '60s have also been a popular mainstay of the label. They are typically made with the original orchestrations, sometimes with original cast members but more commonly with prominent current-day stars of the Broadway stage. Amongst the more notable releases in recent years have been a full recording of Martin Charnin's Mata Hari, a concert recording of songs from Kelly with Sally Mayes, Marcia Lewis, Jane Connell, Sandy Stewart and others (including Bruce Yeko himself on backing vocals), and a lavish 2-CD recording containing the entire score from the notorious 1966 flop Breakfast at Tiffany's, featuring original cast member Sally Kellerman along with Faith Prince, John Schneider, Hal Linden and Patrick Cassidy. Recent Original Cast releases have included Brownstone (musical) (OC6052) starring Liz Callaway, Brian D'Arcy James, Debbie Gravitte, Rebecca Luker and Kevin Reed; Noël Coward - Off The Record (OC1128) starring Steve Ross.

In November 2009, Bruce Yeko purchased the Footlight.com website. (www.footlight.com). That same year, Original Cast issued the first in what would become a semi-regular series of recordings under the title Lost Broadway and More. These featured lesser-known theater songs (invariably from lesser-known musicals or cut songs from well-known musicals), many previously unrecorded, performed by contemporary artists and occasionally by original cast members (such as Kitty Carlisle Hart) or by the composer/lyricist (such as Sheldon Harnick, Ray Jessel and Marian Grudeff).

In November 2013, Original Cast Records released The Girl I Left Behind Me starring Jessica Walker (with Joe Atkins at the piano) that was featured at 59E59 Theatres Brits Off Broadway, May 2013 and was a New York Times Critics Pick.

In 2014, Original Cast Records made available - for the first time - twenty titles for Digital Download including The Baker's Wife, In Trousers, Carmelina, Alison Fraser's Original Cast Recording of Lizzie Borden and Ms. Fraser's solo CDs: Men In My Life and A New York Romance. Also issued were: Ben Bagley's The Littlest Revue (originally produced by Bruce Yeko), Breakfast At Tiffany's (Studio Cast Recording), The Girl I Left Behind Me, Noel Coward: off the record (Steve Ross), Lost Broadway and More - Volume 4 (Women Theatre Composers), Jim Steinman's The Confidence Man, Brownstone, A Doll's Life, The Robber Bridegroom, Oh, Brother, Is There Life After High School?, Bring Back Birdie, and A...My Name Will Always Be Alice (songs from A...My Name Is Alice & A...My Name Is Still Alice.) As well as their first CD-single, George S. Irving's "The Butler's Song" from So Long, 174th Street.

In 2020, Original Cast released the eighth installment of its semi-regular series, Lost Musicals and More.

== Select list of releases ==
EPs

- THT761: The Robber Bridegroom (studio cast)
- THT771: Martin Charnin's Mini-Album: 5 Great Songs from Not-So-Great Shows
- THT773: The Baker's Wife Mini-Album (studio cast)

LPs

- THT772: The Baker's Wife (with members of touring cast)
- THT774: The Second Shepherd's Play (off-off-Broadway cast)
- THT775: Beauty & the Beast/Snow White & the Seven Dwarfs
- BBD776: Canada (original Barn Theater cast)
- THT777: 18 Interesting Songs from Unfortunate Shows
- THT788: 2: A New Musical Revue (original off-Broadway cast)
- BBD789: Monsieur de Pourceaugnac (Hartley House Theater cast)
- THT7810: Nefertiti (original Chicago cast)
- THT7811: Downriver (studio cast)
- OC7812: Piano Bar: A Musical (original off-Broadway cast)
- OC7913: Christy (original off-Broadway cast)
- FS7914: Songs from Movie Movie (studio cast)
- OC7915: In Trousers (original off-Broadway cast)
- OC7916: Festival (original off-Broadway cast)
- OC7917: Duel (studio cast)
- OC7918: The Utter Glory of Morrissey Hall (OBC)
- OC8019: Carmelina (with original cast members)
- OC8020: Survival Run (film soundtrack)
- OC8021: Flowers for Algernon (original London cast)
- OC8022: Lovesong (with original cast members)
- OC8023: Fly With Me (Columbia University cast)
- OC8024: Musical Chairs (with original cast members)
- OC8025: Kelly (1964 demo sung by composer/lyricist)
- OC8026: An Evening with W S Gilbert (original off-Broadway cast)
- OC8027: Five after Eight (original off-off-Broadway cast)
- OC8028: King of Hearts (OBC)
- OC8129: Celeste Holm gives a very personal tribute to Oklahoma
- CYM8130: Ka-Boom! (original off-Broadway cast)
- OC8131: So Long, 174th Street (OBC)
- OC8132: Bring Back Birdie (OBC)
- OC8133: The Housewives' Cantata (with original cast members)
- OC8134: One Night Stand (OBC)
- OC8135: Onward Victoria (with original cast members)
- CYM8236: 81 Proof (original LA cast)
- OC8237: Alec Wilder: Clues to a Life (OBC)
- OC8238: Prettybelle (with original 1971 cast members)
- OC8240: Is There Life After High School? (OBC)
- OC8241: A Doll's Life (OBC)
- OC8342: Oh Brother (OBC)
- OC8843: Songs from Late Nite Comic (studio cast)

CDs (a select list)

- THT891: The Baker's Wife (re-issue of THT772 - Re-mastered)
- OC1128: Noel Coward - off the record (Steve Ross)
- OC1326: The Girl I Left Behind Me (starring Jessica Walker)
- OC2015: Out on Broadway (original St. Louis cast)
- OC6009: Watch your step (Musicals Tonight! cast)
- OC6022: June Angela (self-titled album)
- OC6025: Come Back Little Sheba (original cast featuring Donna McKechnie)
- OC6026: Foxy (Musicals Tonight! cast)
- OC6042: Sadie Thompson (studio cast - world premiere recording)
- OC6052: Brownstone (original cast featuring Liz Callaway)
- OC6058: The Confidence Man (studio cast)
- OC6100: Man with a Load of Mischief (studio cast)
- OC902: Is There Life After High School? (re-issue of OC8240)
- OC913: A Hard Time to be Single (original off-Broadway cast)
- OC914: Pictures in the Hall (original off-Broadway cast)
- OC915: Oh Brother (re-issue of OC8342)
- OC916: Jeff Harnar sings The 1959 Broadway Songbook
- OC9212: One Man Band (studio cast)
- OC9214: Arthur Siegel sings Arthur Siegel
- OC9216: The Baker's Wife (second re-issue of THT772)
- OC9217: Eddie Cantor: The Complete Carnegie Hall Concert
- OC9218: Songs from Future Musicals (Brian Gari)
- OC9348: Music in search if a musical (Michael Valenti)
- OC9365: Then and again (Kaye Ballard)
- OC9510: Great Expectations (studio cast)
- OC9839: Legends and Songwriters in Concert 1941

Lost Broadway and More series

- 2009: Volume 1 (no subtitle)
- 2009: Volume 2 (no subtitle)
- 2010: Volume 3 (subtitled Michael Lavine and Friends)
- 2012: Volume 4 (subtitled Women Theatre Composers)
- 2013: Volume 5 (subtitled Comden/Green/Styne)
- 2014: Volume 6 (subtitled Jerome Kern)
- 2015: Volume 7 (subtitled More buried treasures reDISCovered)
- 2020: Volume 8 (subtitled Musical theatre’s under-the-radar forget-me-nots)
