= Prettybelle =

- Original Cast Recording
- Music: Jule Styne
- Lyrics: Bob Merrill
- Book: Bob Merrill
- Basis: Prettybelle by Jean Arnold
- Productions: 1971 Boston

Prettybelle is a musical with a book and lyrics by Bob Merrill and music by Jule Styne. It was adapted from Jean Arnold's darkly comic novel Prettybelle: A Lively Tale of Rape and Resurrection (Dial Press, 1970). It starred Angela Lansbury, but never was produced on Broadway and closed in Boston in 1971.

== History ==
Bob Merrill and Jule Styne met with director Gene Saks for several weeks to work on the musical, but Saks eventually decided not to do the show. Merrill then suggested Gower Champion, who agreed to tackle the project because "It grabbed me." Angela Lansbury liked the idea of an intimate show for a small theatre.

The show was plagued with problems from the start. Merrill's and Champion's intent to bring to the stage the techniques and abstractions of avant-garde films never was fulfilled. Champion wanted a "no-glitz approach" and so the set design was a unit set that had to "take on...different aspects...and wasn't complex". Producer Alexander H. Cohen was dissatisfied with director/choreographer Champion's approach to the material and his dictatorial treatment of the cast, and the latter ultimately banned him from rehearsals. Leading lady Angela Lansbury pledged to boycott a move to Broadway unless everything was fixed during the out-of-town tryout in Boston.

== Production ==
Cohen scheduled the Broadway opening at the Majestic Theatre for March 15, 1971, the last day of Tony Award eligibility, in order to get publicity for the show. The Boston tryout opened on February 1, 1971 at the Shubert Theatre. In addition to Lansbury, the cast included Jon Cypher and Charlotte Rae. Champion was the director, scenic design was by Oliver Smith and costumes by Ann Roth. Much to Lansbury's relief, Cohen closed the show in Boston on March 6, 1971.

Although bootleg recordings of the entire show are known to exist, no original cast recording was ever released at the time. In 1982, record producer Bruce Yeko (who headed the Original Cast record label) reunited the principal members of the original cast (Angela Lansbury, Mark Dawson, Peter Lombard and Bert Michaels) to record a new studio album of the show. The LP was re-issued on CD in 1993 by Varèse Sarabande.

== Synopsis ==
A spectral Folksinger sings the ballad of one Prettybelle Sweet... In 1968: Prettybelle is writing her memoirs from an insane asylum ("Manic-Depressives"). She was the ladylike wife of Leroy Sweet, a bigoted sheriff in the Jim Crow South. He was blatantly unfaithful to her ("You Ain't Hurtin' Your Ole Lady None"), and when he suddenly dies, she ambivalently mourns him ("To a Small Degree"). Leroy's ghost returns ("Back from the Great Beyond"), and boasts of his hate crimes against African Americans. She is horrified ("How Could I Know?"), and attempts to make amends by writing checks to the NAACP and offering herself sexually to Mexicans and African American men ("I Never Did Imagine"). Prettybelle becomes involved with Mason Miller, a liberal lawyer ("I Met a Man"). As a result, the Ku Klux Klan attacks Prettybelle's house. However, the local hippies help her clean her house up ("God's Garden"). But, then, at the climax, Mason shockingly betrays Prettybelle and she goes into hiding at the state asylum ("Prettybelle" reprise).

== Song list ==
Act I

- "The Twice Weekly Piciyumi Gazette"
- "Manic-Depressives"
- "Prettybelle"
- "You Ain't Hurtin' Your Ole Lady None"
- "You Never Looked Better" (cut before Boston, never performed)
- "To a Small Degree"
- "Back from the Great Beyond"
- "How Could I Know?"
- "I Never Did Imagine"
- "New Orleans Poon" (cut in Boston)
- "In the Japanese Gardens"
- "Individual Thing"
- The John Sweet Suite (ballet)
- "I Met a Man"

Act II

- "God's Garden"
- "No-Tell Motel"
- "I'm in a Tree" (cut in Boston)
- "When I'm Drunk I'm Beautiful"
- "Give Me A Share In America"
- "Prettybelle" (reprise)

== Response ==
The opening night audience was angered by the musical's story. "Clearly, Boston was not the place to open an unconventional musical like this one." Oliver Smith noted that "the audience absolutely resented every moment of it, and just booed and hissed and carried on." The critics were brutal. Critic Kevin Kelly said it was "pretty bad", and Variety wrote that it was "a collection of ethnic slams and four-letter words." However, critic Elliot Norton praised the show, writing that "this bold new show...could become a memorable American musical play. It can and it should."

According to Steven Suskin, the musical was "rather fascinating if unconventional, and the score is not uninteresting. But the show's subject matter, back in the dark days of 1971, doomed it."

Ken Mandelbaum wrote that "it did not work and was a serious turn-off to the audience. Angela Lansbury was never better than in the title role."
