= Rock-a-Billy (song) =

Single by Guy Mitchell
- B-side: "Hoot Owl"
- Released: March 11, 1957
- Recorded: March 7, 1957
- Studio: Columbia Recording Studio A, New York City
- Genre: Rockabilly
- Length: 2:10
- Label: Columbia Records
- Songwriter(s): Woody Harris, Eddie V. Deane

Guy Mitchell singles chronology
"Knee Deep in the Blues" (1956)	"Rock-a-Billy" (1957)	"In the Middle of a Dark, Dark Night" (1957)

"Rock-a-Billy" is a popular song by Woody Harris and Eddie V. Deane, published in 1957. The song was popularized by Guy Mitchell in 1957.

== Chart performance ==
Mitchell's recording (released as Columbia Records catalog number 40877) reached No. 10 on the Billboard Hot 100 chart in the United States, and No. 1 on the UK Singles Chart for one week in May 1957.

== Cover versions ==
- Billie Anthony also did a version of this song (Columbia Records – 45-DB 3935); album EMI presents the magic of Billie Anthony (EMI Gold – 7243 5 31996 2 3).
