= Bob Merrill =

American songwriter (1921–1998)

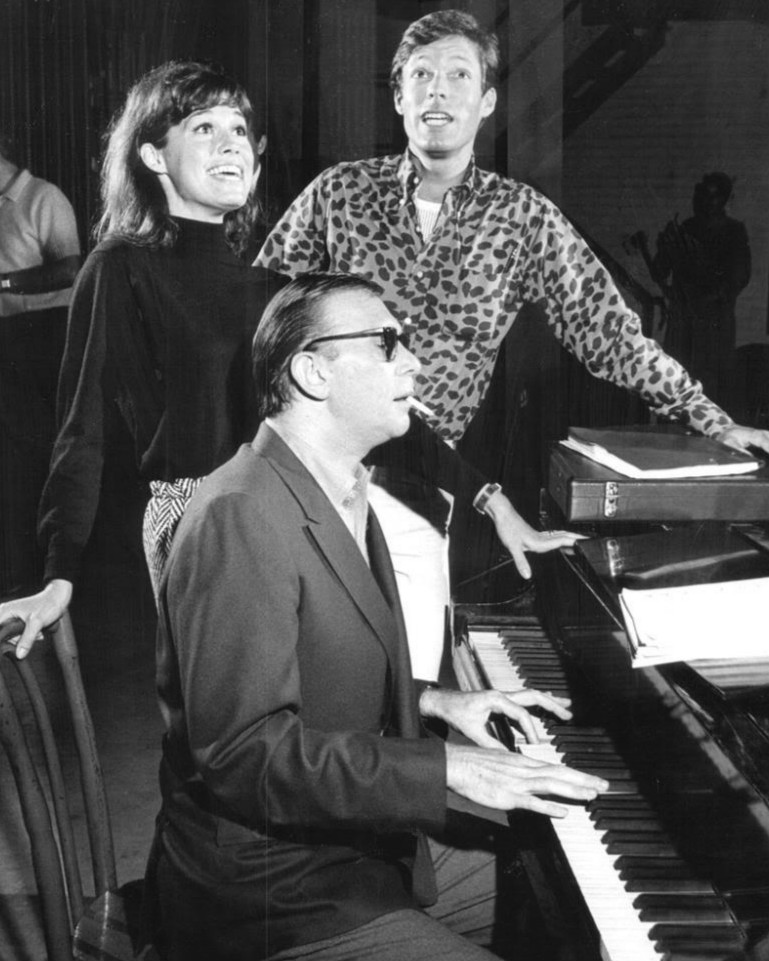
- Merrill rehearsing for Breakfast at Tiffany's with Mary Tyler Moore and Richard Chamberlain (1966)

Background information
- Born: Henry Robert Merrill Levan; May 17, 1921; Atlantic City, New Jersey, U.S.
- Died: February 17, 1998 (aged 76) Culver City, California, U.S.
- Occupations: Songwriter; theatrical composer; lyricist; screenwriter

Henry Merrill Levan (May 17, 1921 – February 17, 1998) was an American songwriter, theatrical composer, lyricist, and screenwriter. Merrill was one of the most successful songwriters of the 1950s on the US and UK single charts. His musicals for the Broadway stage include Carnival! (music and lyrics) and Funny Girl (lyrics).

Merrill played an important role in American popular music, tapping out many of the hit parade songs of the 1950s on a toy xylophone, including "(How Much Is) That Doggie in the Window?", "Mambo Italiano", and "If I Knew You Were Comin' I'd've Baked a Cake". In the estimation of composer Paul Sportelli, Merrill’s ballads have great emotional depth, while his up-tempo lyrics display a humorous sense of the vernacular.

Merrill was inducted to the Songwriters Hall of Fame in 1987. Other career accolades include five Tony Award nominations, as well as the New York Drama Critics' Circle Award for his work on Carnival! in 1961.

== Early life ==
Merrill was born in Atlantic City, New Jersey, and raised in Philadelphia over his family's candy factory and soda fountain. As a teenager, he wanted to be a singer and performed in all local talent contests and even worked as an impressionist-emcee at a local burlesque house. His plans for a career in show business were cut short by the outbreak of World War II, when he was drafted into the Horse Cavalry Division of the Army.

== Career ==
After the war, Merrill moved to Hollywood, where he worked as a dialogue director for Columbia Pictures, and while on location for a film, he was asked to write some songs for the film actress Dorothy Shay, who was recording an album at the time. Shay's album Park Avenue Hillbilly became a hit, which launched Merrill's career. Soon he was invited to collaborate with Al Hoffman and Clem Watts to write some songs. They came up with a novelty song "If I Knew You Were Comin' I'd've Baked a Cake", recorded in 1948 by Eileen Barton. He also co-wrote the Moon Mullican song "You Don't Have to Be a Baby to Cry".

Guy Mitchell recorded many of Merrill's songs, including "Sparrow in the Treetop", "She Wears Red Feathers", and "My Truly, Truly Fair".

Merrill made his Broadway debut in 1957 with New Girl in Town, a musical adaptation of Eugene O'Neill's Anna Christie. The show was nominated for the Tony Award for Best Musical. Take Me Along followed in 1959, with music and lyrics by Merrill, starring Jackie Gleason and Walter Pidgeon. The musical was nominated for the 1960 Tony Award for Best Musical. In 1961, the film Lili was made into the Broadway musical Carnival!, starring Anna Maria Alberghetti, with words and music by Merrill. The show was nominated for the 1962 Tony Award for Best Musical.

He had theatrical success with the 1964 musical Funny Girl starring Barbra Streisand, which introduced the standards "People" and "Don't Rain on My Parade". After hearing the artistry of Streisand’s recording, he fought to keep “People” as a showstopper when songs were being considered for cuts. Merrill and songwriting partner Jule Styne were nominated for the 1964 Tony Award for Best Original Score. When the stage show was adapted as a 1968 film, he and Styne were asked to write a title tune, which was nominated for both the Academy Award for Best Original Song and Golden Globe Award for Best Original Song.

Producer David Merrick hired Merrill to write additional songs for the musical Hello, Dolly! by Jerry Herman. Merrill contributed the songs "Motherhood March" and "Elegance", as well as additional lyrics to Herman's "It Takes a Woman". Merrill did not accept billing or credit for his additions to the score.

Merrill's other Broadway credits include Breakfast at Tiffany's (1966), Henry, Sweet Henry (1967), Sugar (1972) (reworked as Some Like It Hot for a 1992 production in London's West End starring Tommy Steele and a 2002-2003 United States national tour starring Tony Curtis as Osgood Fielding, Jr.), and The Red Shoes (1993).

He provided lyrics to "Loss of Love", the theme song composed by Henry Mancini for the 1970 Italian drama film Sunflower.

He wrote the book and lyrics for the musical Prettybelle (1971), starring Angela Lansbury and directed by Gower Champion, which closed in Boston during tryouts. He wrote the music and lyrics for The Prince of Grand Street (1978), starring Robert Preston and directed by Gene Saks, which also closed during its Boston tryouts (following negative reviews during the earlier Philadelphia tryout).

Among Merrill's television credits were two holiday specials: Mister Magoo's Christmas Carol (1962) and The Dangerous Christmas of Red Riding Hood (1965), written for Liza Minnelli.

Merrill's screenwriting credits include W. C. Fields and Me (1976), and the television movies Portrait of a Showgirl (1982) and The Animated Adventures of Tom Sawyer (1998).

== Personal life and death ==
Merrill was married to Dolores Marquez in 1964; they divorced and he married Suzanne Reynolds in 1976. Suffering from depression and ill health in his later years, Merrill died by suicide on February 17, 1998, at age 76.

== Stage musicals ==
- New Girl In Town (1957)
- Take Me Along (1959)
- Carnival! (1961)
- Funny Girl (1964)
- Breakfast at Tiffany's (1966)
- Henry, Sweet Henry (1967)
- Prettybelle (1971)
- Sugar (1972)
- The Prince of Grand Street (1978)
- We're Home (1984) – Off-Broadway
- Hannah... 1939 (1990) – Off-Broadway
- The Red Shoes (1993) (credited as Paul Stryker)

Source: Playbill

== Popular songs ==
- "People" – Barbra Streisand
- "(How Much Is) That Doggie in the Window?" – Patti Page
- "If I Knew You Were Comin' I'd've Baked a Cake" – Eileen Barton
- "Honeycomb" – Jimmie Rodgers
- "Mambo Italiano" – Rosemary Clooney
- "Pittsburgh, Pennsylvania" – Guy Mitchell
- "Love Makes the World Go 'Round" – Jane Morgan
- "The Kid's Last Fight" – Frankie Laine
- "Tina Marie" – Perry Como
- "Make Yourself Comfortable" – Sarah Vaughan

== Recordings by Guy Mitchell ==
- "Chicka Boom"
- "Feet Up (Pat Him on the Po-Po)"
- "Look at That Girl"
- "My Truly, Truly Fair"
- "Pittsburgh, Pennsylvania"
- "She Wears Red Feathers"
- "Sparrow in the Treetop"

Source: AllMusic
