= Doelger Building =

Building in San Francisco

Coordinates: 37.76242°N 122.46568°W

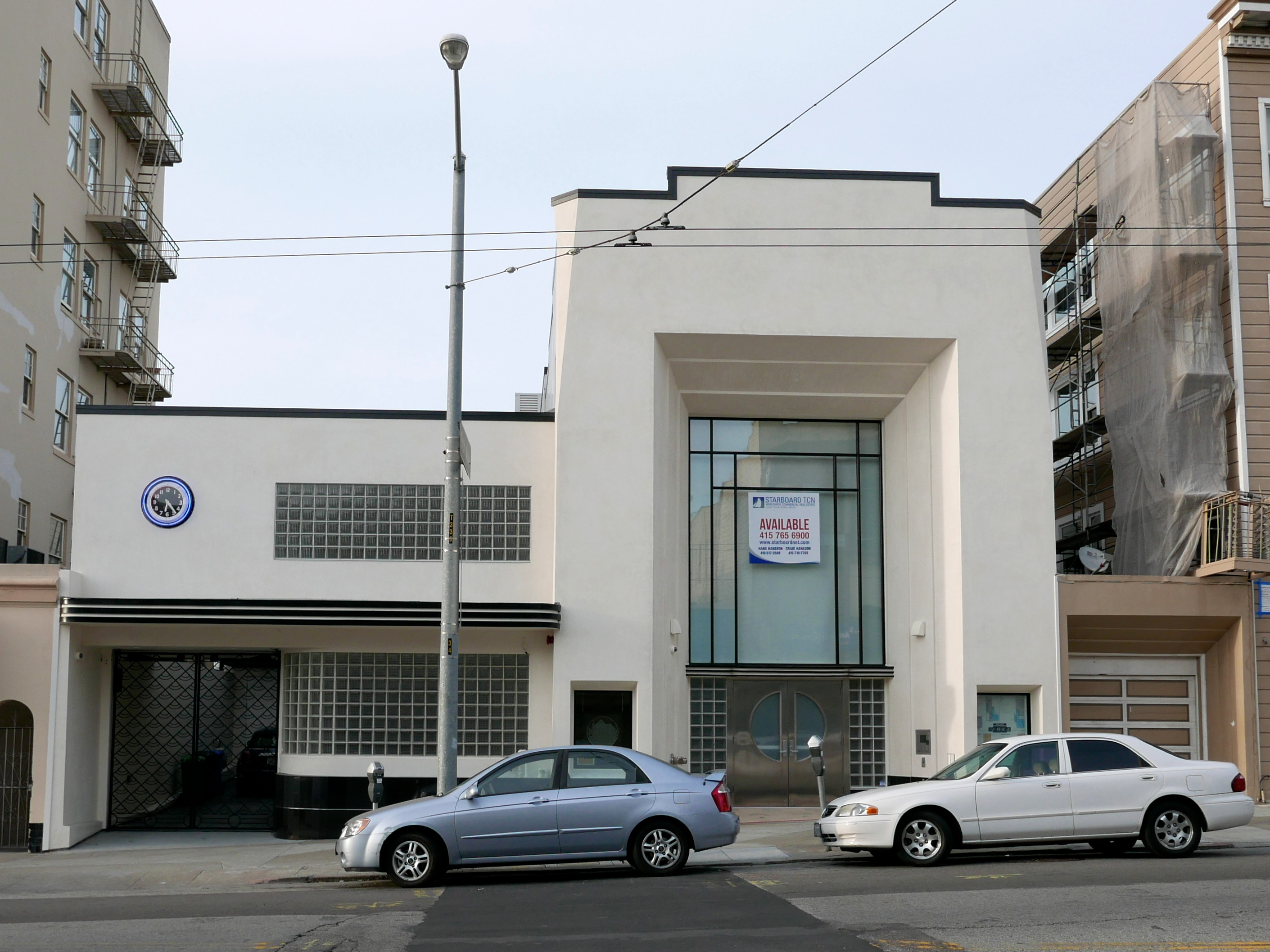
- Doelger Building in March 2015

- Location within San Francisco County Doelger Bldg (California) Doelger Bldg (the United States)

General information
- Architectural style: Art Deco
- Location: 320 Judah St, San Francisco, California, U.S.
- Completed: 1932

Design and construction
- Architect: Charles O. Clausen
- Developer: Henry Doelger

San Francisco Designated Landmark
- Designated: April 10, 2013
- Reference no.: 265

The Doelger Building is a 1932 Art Deco office building located in the Inner Sunset district on the West Side of San Francisco, California. It served as the headquarters of developer Henry Doelger, who built large low-cost housing tracts of San Francisco and Daly City. It was designed by Charles Clausen.

In April 2013, the Doelger Building became a San Francisco Designated Landmark.

== History ==
The original one story with mezzanine building was built in 1932 for $4000. A garage, that mimicked the stepped vestibule of the main building, was added to the east later that year. When Doelger's business expanded, the roof was raised in 1936 to add another mezzanine level. At the time, the building featured a projecting vertical blade sign with neon lettering, reading “Henry Doelger Homes." In 1940, the building expanded onto the adjacent western lot, with Streamline Moderne detailing added onto the Art Deco exterior.

The garage is now a part of the adjacent, eastern building and is not considered a part of the landmark.
