= My Heart Cries for You =

Folk French melody adapted into a popular English song

- A-side of the vinyl

Single by Guy Mitchell
- B-side: "The Roving Kind"
- Released: November 1950
- Recorded: November 1950
- Genre: Traditional pop
- Length: 2:41
- Label: Columbia; 39067 (CO 44590)
- Songwriters: Carl Sigman, Percy Faith

Guy Mitchell singles chronology
"My Heart Cries for You" (1950)	"You're Just in Love" (1951)
- Orchestra and chorus directed by Mitch Miller

External audio
- You may hear an arrangement of "My Heart Cries for You" by Guy Mitchell performed in 1950 Here on listenbrainz.org

"My Heart Cries for You" is a popular song, adapted by Carl Sigman and Percy Faith from an 18th-century French melody. The song has been recorded by many singers, the most successful of which was recorded by Guy Mitchell. His version reached No. 2 on the Billboard and No. 1 on the Cashbox charts in 1951.

== Background ==
The music is based on an old French song believed to date from the time of Louis XVI and Marie Antoinette, "La jardinière du Roi" ("The King's Gardener"), also titled "Chanson de Marie Antoinette" (Marie Antoinette's song) as the music was said to have been written by Marie Antoinette. The French song was published in the US in 1927, and recorded by Lily Pons in 1938.

In 1950, Percy Faith (using the alias Peter Mars) adapted the music of the song with Carl Sigman writing new English lyrics for the song. The lyrics of this version, "My heart cries for you, sighs for you, dies for you..." are original and unrelated to the French song. In the song the singer begs his loved one to come back to them. It was written in three-quarter waltz time. It was also considered a pretty simple song for the time, much like "Mockin' Bird Hill" and "On Top of Old Smoky".

== Guy Mitchell recording ==
=== Recording ===
The song was recorded in November 1950 by Guy Mitchell with Mitch Miller and his orchestra. Mitch Miller originally had intended "My Heart Cries for You" and "The Roving Kind" to be recorded by Frank Sinatra, however, Sinatra was not interested in the songs chosen for him when he arrived the day the recording was scheduled, and said: "I'm not doing any of that crap". Miller, who had already booked the musicians for the recording session, then looked for a replacement to record the song. He invited a new singer that he liked, Al Cernic, to come to the studio that evening. The recording went well, and Miller then told Cernic that he should change his name as Miller could not pronounce it. Cernic, initially reluctant, then became Guy Mitchell for the record release.

=== Release and charts ===
The song was released with "The Roving Kind" as its B-side in November 1950 by Columbia Records (catalog number 39067). It became Mitchell's first hit song, reaching number 2 for seven weeks on the Billboard chart in 1951 with over a million copies sold. It was number 1 on Your Hit Parade for two weeks, and number 1 on Cashbox magazine's Best-Selling Singles chart for six weeks.

Mitchell released another version of the song in late 1958 in a rockabilly style. The B-side was also different, being "Under a Rainbow".

== Connie Francis version ==
"My Heart Cries for You"

Single by Connie Francis

from the album My Heart Cries for You
- B-side: US – "Someone Took the Sweetness out of Sweetheart" UK – "If My Friends Could See Me Now/I'm a Brass Band"
- Released: July 1967
- Recorded: June 1, 1967 (A-side); May 19, 1967 (B-side)
- Genre: Easy listening; Traditional pop
- Length: 2:56 (A-side); 2:16 (B-side)
- Label: MGM; K 13773
- Songwriters: Carl Sigman, Percy Faith
- Producer: Bob Morgan

Connie Francis US singles chronology
"Time Alone Will Tell" / "Born Free" (1967)	"My Heart Cries for You" (1967)	"Lonely Again" / "When You Care a lot for Someone" (1967)

American-Italian singer Connie Francis recorded the song on June 1, 1967. It was released as a single in July 1967 by MGM Records, and saw a minor revival.

=== Release and reception ===
It was released as a seven-inch single in early July 1967, by MGM Records. The song was backed by a Francis original, "Someone Took The Sweetness Out Of Sweetheart" written by Stock on the B-side. Both of the songs were produced by Bob Morgan. The A-side was arranged by Joe Sherman, and the latter song was arranged by Roy Glover. The UK release saw a medley "If My Friends Could See Me Now/I'm a Brass Band" from Sweet Charity as the B-side. "My Heart Cries for You" was the namesake for her album released the same month featuring country hits.

The single received a positive critical reception upon its release. The initial Billboard magazine review stated that "With all the summertime sing-a-long flavor included for a big chart item, Miss Francis has a sure-fire winner in this revival of the former Guy Mitchell hit." Concluding that it was "Top Bob Morgan production work and Joe Sherman arrangement." Cashbox magazine noted that "Connie Francis' full bodied, emotion-packed treatment of this oldie might well be a big winner for her." Calling it a "Feelingful performance" and noting that the flip was a "Sad but swinging toe tapper". Record World believed that "It's in a class above most hit reworkings." In the United Kingdom, Derek Johnson of the New Musical Express said that the song was "An evergreen, unabashed sweet-corn sing-along, with Connie warbling in her usual emotional sob-in-the-throat style, and backing group lustily joining in the chorus." The magazine also believed that she sounded like a "female Al Martino", but called it "very tuneful".

=== Chart performance ===
"My Heart Cries for You" debuted at No. 118 on the Billboard Bubbling Under Hot 100 chart, remaining on the chart for two weeks. The single reached No. 96 on the Cashbox Top 100 Singles, and peaked at No. 116 on the Record World Up-Coming Singles chart. The single debuted on the Billboard Easy Listening in the issue dated July 22, 1967, peaking at No. 12 during an eight-week run on the chart. The single debuted on the Record World Top Non-Rock chart in the issue dated July 22, 1967, at No. 36, peaking at No. 19 also during an eight-week run on the chart. Although seeing an international release, outside of America the single didn't sell well, and like her previous singles didn't chart in foreign countries.

=== Subsequent foreign releases ===
She also recorded the song in German as "Mein Herz ruft nach dir" and in French as "Mon cœur pleure pour vous", the latter marking her last French-language recording of the 1960s. Both songs were released in their respective countries, although they didn't see commercial success.

== Other recordings ==
Billboard magazine notice for the single. In the issue dated December 23, 1950.

External audio
- You may hear an arrangement of "My Heart Cries for You" by John Serry performed in 1956 Here on listenbrainz.org

=== Early versions ===
Many versions of the song were recorded and released in late 1950 and early 1951. A version was first recorded by Dinah Shore with Henri René's Orchestra & Chorus in New York City, and released around the same time as Guy Mitchell. (RCA Victor Records catalog number 20–3978 in the US dated October 29, 1950, and EMI on the His Master's Voice in the UK, catalog number B 10026.) It reached number 3 on Billboard's pop chart.

Numerous cover versions by other artists quickly followed, including Vic Damone (a number 4 hit on the Billboard chart), Jimmy Wakely (number 12 on pop and number 7 on country), Bill Farrell (number 18), Al Morgan (number 24), Evelyn Knight and Red Foley, a duet which reached number 28 pop and number 6 country, and Victor Young and His Singing Strings (number 29 on pop). Versions of the song were also recorded by Slim Whitman and UK singer Ronnie Carroll.

=== Other versions ===
- The composition was also arranged and recorded by John Serry, Sr. and his ensemble for Dot Records as a 33 rpm vinyl recording entitled Squeeze Play in 1956. Subsequently, it was released by Versailles Records as a 45 rpm recording under the title Chicago Musette - John Serry et son Accordéon in 1958.
- A revival by Ray Charles reached the U.S. pop top forty in March 1964 and the U.S. easy listening top twenty.
- Jimmy Roselli released the song as a single in late 1968, it was one of his last charting singles, reaching No. 123 on Cashbox's Looking Ahead chart the next year.
- The song became a popular album cut. Percy Faith himself recorded an instrumental version of this song in the early 1970s. It is on his 1973 album, Corazón. On his 2005 "comeback" album, The Moon Was Blue, country singer Bobby Bare also recorded a version of the song. On her 2006 album If Your Memory Serves You Well, Serena Ryder covers this, as well as many other classics. The album received Gold certification. Harry James released a version in 1981 on his album For Listening And Dancing (Reader's Digest RD4A 213).
- Margo Smith released a version in 1981 that peaked at number 72 on the Billboard Hot Country Singles chart. It was ranked lower by Record World magazine at number 81, and Cashbox magazine at number 88. This country revival became the last version of the song to reach the charts.

== Charts ==
Chart performance for Mitchell's version
Chart (1951)	Peak position
US Billboard Best-Selling Pop Singles	2
US Cashbox Best-Selling Singles	1
US Your Hit Parade Broadcast	1

Chart performance for Damone's version
Chart (1951)	Peak position
US Billboard Best-Selling Pop Singles	4

Chart performance for Shore's version
Chart (1951)	Peak position
US Billboard Best-Selling Pop Singles	3

Chart performance for Wakely's version
Chart (1951)	Peak position
US Billboard Best-Selling Pop Singles	12
US Billboard Top C&W Records	7

Chart performance for Knight's and Foley's version
Chart (1951)	Peak position
US Billboard Best-Selling Pop Singles	29
US Billboard Top C&W Records	6

Chart performance for Charles' version
Chart (1964)	Peak position
US Billboard Hot 100	38
US Billboard Easy Listening	12

Chart performance for Francis' version
Chart (1967)	Peak position
US Billboard Bubbling Under Hot 100	118
US Billboard Easy Listening	12
US Cashbox Top 100 Singles	96
US Record World Up-Coming Singles	116
US Record World Top Non-Rock	19

Chart performance for Roselli's version
Chart (1969)	Peak position
US Cashbox Looking Ahead	123

Chart performance for Smith's version
Chart (1981)	Peak position
US Billboard Hot Country Songs	72
US Cashbox Top 100 Country	88
US Record World Country Singles	81
