= Breakfast at Tiffany's (novella) =

1958 novella by American author Truman Capote

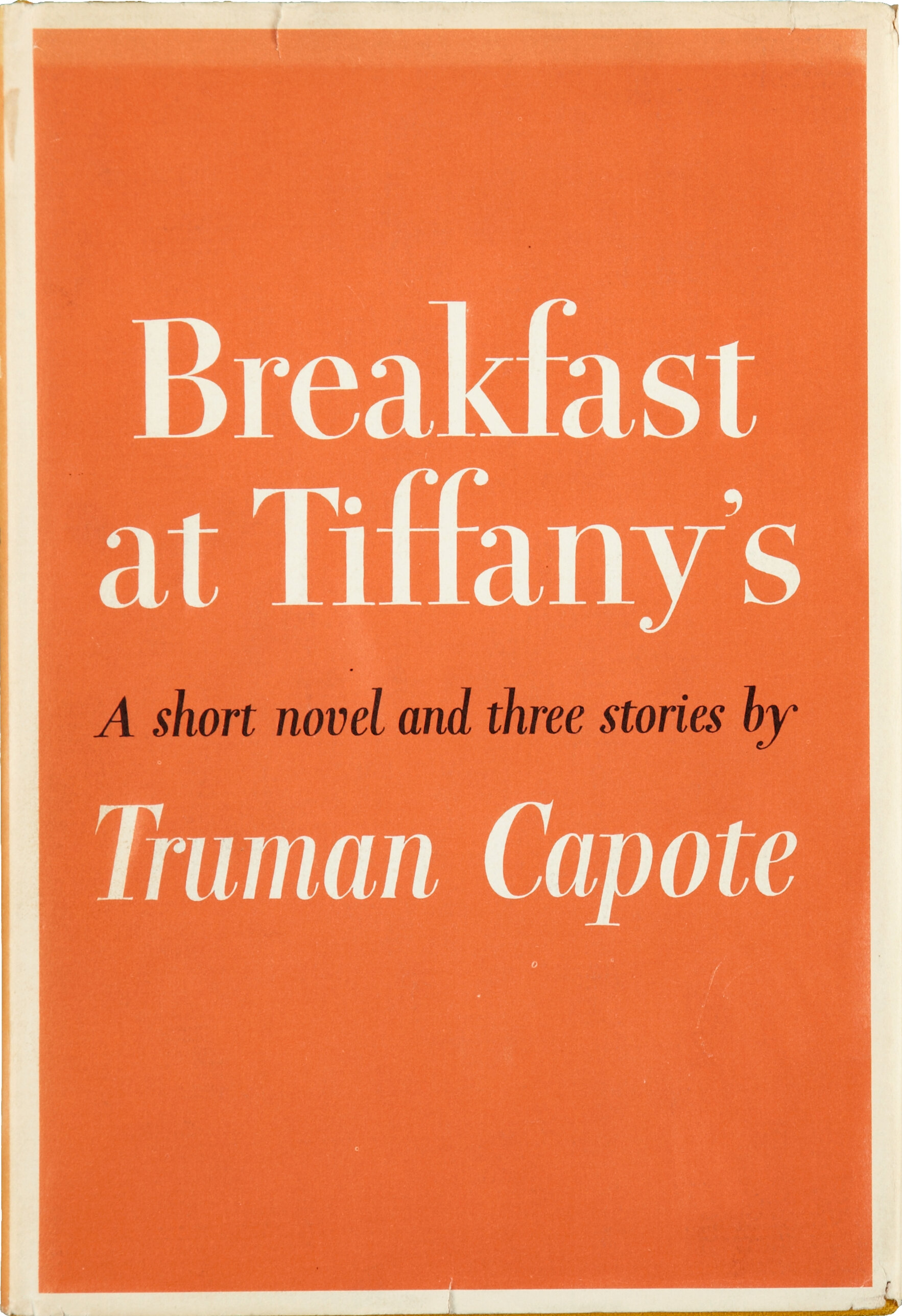
- First edition cover
- Author: Truman Capote
- Language: English
- Publisher: Random House
- Publication date: October 28, 1958
- Publication place: United States
- Media type: Print (Hardback and paperback), e-book, audio-CD
- Pages: 179
- OCLC: 964700
- Dewey Decimal: 813/.54 20
- LC Class: PS3505.A59 A6 1993

Breakfast at Tiffany's is a novella by Truman Capote published in 1958. In it, a contemporary writer recalls his early days in New York City, when he makes the acquaintance of his remarkable neighbor, Holly Golightly. In 1961 it was adapted into a major motion picture of the same name.

== Setting ==
The novella is set in 1940s New York, specifically the Upper East Side, in Holly's brownstone apartment. By that time, brownstones had become stylish, and were no longer considered decrepit and outdated. In fact, the Upper East Side had become a fairly affluent area. The novella's setting plays an important role in the plot; various wealthy characters from the area come in and out of Holly Golightly's life.

Though the novella does not take place in the American South, there are mentions of it later in the novella: the reader follows Golightly's life in Manhattan for the entirety of the novella, but she was actually born in Texas, a place that she was desperate to escape.

== Plot ==
In autumn 1943, the unnamed narrator befriends Holly Golightly. The two are tenants in a brownstone apartment in Manhattan's Upper East Side. Holly (age 18–19) is a country girl turned New York café society girl. As such, she has no job and lives by socializing with wealthy men, who take her to clubs and restaurants, and give her money and expensive presents; she hopes to marry one of them. According to Capote, Golightly is not a prostitute, but an "American geisha".

As the novella opens, the reader is introduced to an unnamed narrator who reflects on his friendship with Holly Golightly. Another old friend, Joe Bell, reaches out to the narrator because he believes a wood carving that he has come across depicts Golightly. The reader can assume many years have passed, as the carving is said to be from 1956.

The narrator recalls the specific night he meets Holly. She climbs through his window in order to escape the man that came home with her that night. She mentions the resemblance the narrator has to her brother, Fred, and asks if she can call him that. As they continue to talk, Holly realizes it is Thursday, and explains to the narrator that she visits a prisoner, Sally Tomato, every Thursday in exchange for $100, and passes on a message from him each time.

We are introduced to a slew of characters that are constantly coming in and out of Holly's apartment. During this scene, she strikes up a conversation with our narrator about how Tiffany's is the only place that calms her when she's feeling anxious or overwhelmed. The title is attributed to this scene.

The narrator and Holly's friendship develops, but they feud over a trifling matter. However, when the narrator suspects Holly is being watched, he decides it may be right to break the feud to warn her about this person. He is confronted by the man who has been watching her. The man tells the narrator of Holly's past. He divulges that she was born Lulamae Barnes, and that he is her husband, Doc Golightly. They were married when Holly was fourteen years old. Doc tries to persuade her to come back to Texas with him, but she insists she must stay in New York. They part ways.

Holly finds out her brother has died in the war and this sends her into an emotional downward spiral. She eventually strikes up a relationship with a character named José Ybarra-Jaegar and plans to move to Brazil with him. During this period, she confesses to the narrator that she was a victim of child sexual abuse before the age of thirteen.

Eventually, Holly's visits to the prison draw suspicion and she is arrested after further evidence unveils that Sally Tomato was running a drug ring. José sends her a letter explaining that he does not see a future with her because of her arrest. After getting out on bail, she plans to leave and go to Brazil without José. Before leaving, she sets her cat loose—the cat that she had never given a name. The narrator receives a brief note from her, but hears nothing else. He hopes, though, she has found a place that feels like home.

== Characters ==
- The unnamed narrator-writer: a writer who relates his memories of Holly Golightly, the people in her life, and his relationship with her.
- Holiday (Holly) Golightly: downstairs neighbor and center of attention of the writer's memoirs.
- Joe Bell: A bartender acquainted with both the writer and Holly.
- Mag Wildwood: Holly's friend and sometime roommate, a fellow socialite and model.
- Rusty Trawler: A presumably wealthy man, thrice divorced, well known in society circles.
- José Ybarra-Jaegar: A Brazilian diplomat, who is the companion of Mag Wildwood and, later, of Holly.
- Doc Golightly: A veterinarian from Texas, whom Holly married as a teenager.
- O. J. Berman: A talent agent from Hollywood, who has discovered Holly and groomed her to become a professional actress.
- Salvatore "Sally" Tomato: A convicted racketeer, whom Holly visits weekly in Sing Sing prison.
- Madame Sapphia Spanella: Another tenant in the brownstone.
- Mr. I. Y. Yunioshi: A Japanese photographer, who lives in the top floor studio apartment of the brownstone.

== Conception ==
In early drafts of the story Holly was named Connie Gustafson; Capote later changed her name to Holiday Golightly. He apparently based the character of Holly on several different women, all friends or close acquaintances of his. Claims have been made as to the source of the character, the "real Holly Golightly", in what Capote called the "Holly Golightly Sweepstakes", including socialite Gloria Vanderbilt, actress Oona O'Neill, writer/actress Carol Grace, writer Maeve Brennan, writer Doris Lilly, model Dorian Leigh (whom Capote dubbed "Happy Go Lucky"), and her sister, model Suzy Parker. A November 2020 obituary in The New York Times states that the main inspiration for Holly was socialite Marguerite Littman.

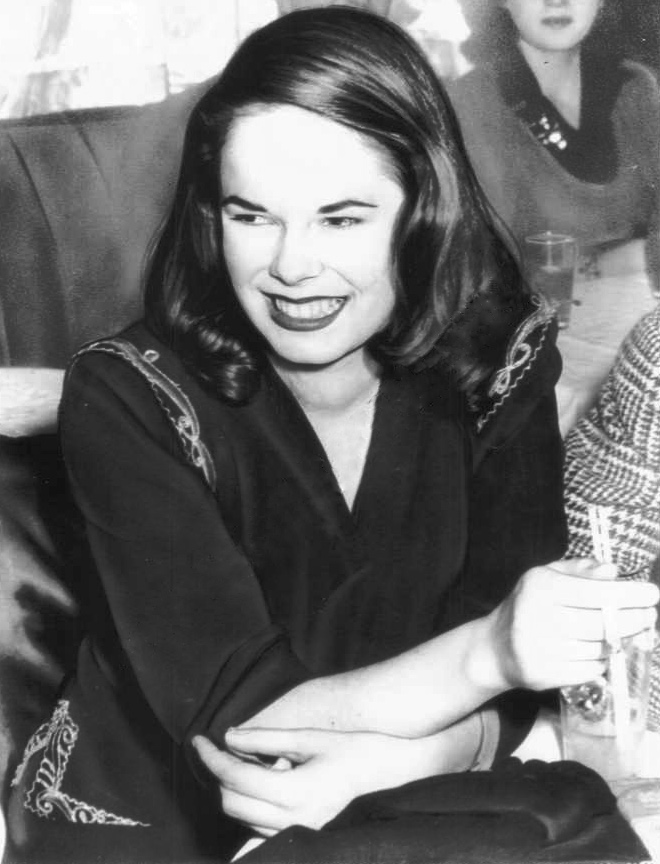
Oona O'Neill (1943)

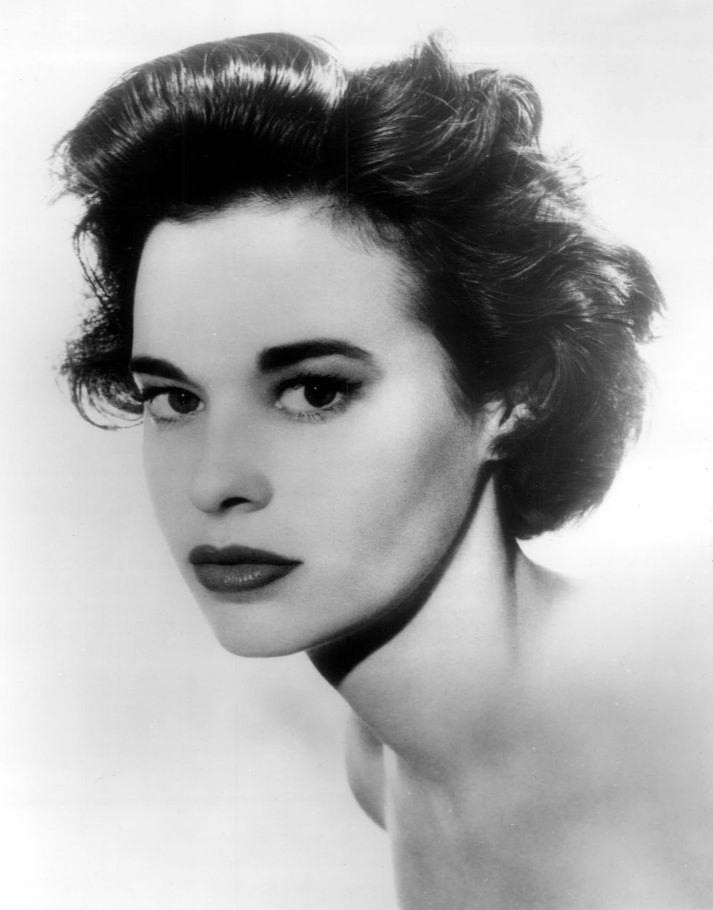
Gloria Vanderbilt (1959)

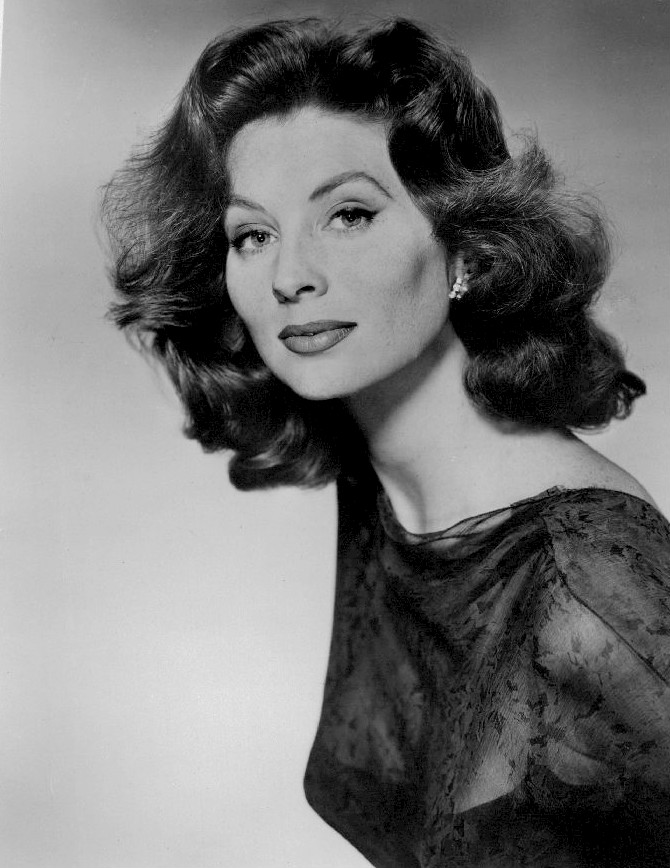
Suzy Parker (1963)

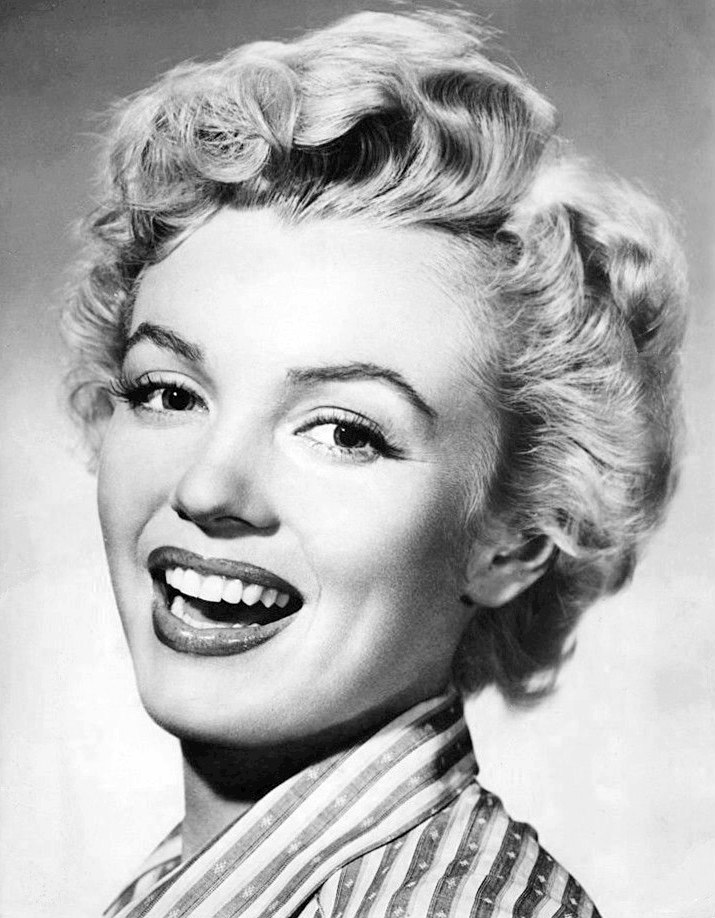
Marilyn Monroe (1952)

Several women (or their agents) claimed to be models for Holly Golightly. Many were dark-haired sophisticated beauties like Audrey Hepburn, yet Capote has said his model was a blonde ("strands of albino-blonde and yellow") closer in character to Marilyn Monroe, who he preferred for the film role that ultimately went to Hepburn.

Capote's biographer Gerald Clarke wrote "half the women he knew... claimed to be the model for his wacky heroine." Clarke also wrote of the similarities between the author himself and the character. There are also similarities between the lives of Holly and Capote's mother, Nina Capote; among other shared attributes both women were born in the rural South, with similar "hick" birth names that they changed (Holly Golightly was born Lulamae Barnes in Texas, Nina Capote was born Lillie Mae Faulk in Alabama), both left the husbands they married as teenagers and abandoned relatives they loved and were responsible for, instead going to New York, and both achieved "café society" status through relationships with wealthier men, though Capote's mother was born two decades earlier than the fictional Holly Golightly. Capote was also unsuccessfully sued for libel and invasion of privacy by a Manhattan resident named Bonnie Golightly who claimed that he had based Holly on her.

According to the biographer of Joan McCracken, McCracken had a violent dressing room outburst after learning of the wartime death of her brother, while she was appearing in the play Bloomer Girl (1944). McCracken's biographer suggests that Capote was inspired by this event as a model for a scene in which Holly reacts to her brother's death overseas. McCracken and her husband Jack Dunphy were close friends of Capote, and Dunphy became Capote's life companion after his 1948 divorce from McCracken. In the novella, Holly Golightly is also depicted singing songs from Oklahoma! (in which McCracken appeared) accompanying herself on a guitar, and owning The Baseball Guide, which was edited by McCracken's uncle.

== Publication history ==
Breakfast at Tiffany's was originally sold to Harper's Bazaar for $2,000 and intended for publication in its July 1958 issue. It was to be illustrated with a big series of photo montages by David Attie, who had been hired for the job by Harper's art director Alexey Brodovitch. However, after the publication was scheduled, longtime Harper's editor Carmel Snow was ousted by the magazine's publisher, the Hearst Corporation, and Hearst executives began asking for changes to the novella's tart language. By this time, Attie's montages had been completed, and Alice Morris, the fiction editor of Harper's, recounted that while Capote initially refused to make any changes, he relented "partly because I showed him the layouts... six pages with beautiful, atmospheric photographs". Yet Hearst ordered Harper's not to run the novella anyway. Its language and subject matter were still deemed "not suitable", and there was concern that Tiffany's, a major advertiser, would react negatively.

An outraged Capote soon resold the work to Esquire for $3,000 ($44,600 today); by his own account, he specified that he "would not be interested if [Esquire] did not use Attie's [original series of] photographs". He wrote to Esquire fiction editor Rust Hills: "I'm very happy that you are using [Attie's] pictures, as I think they are excellent." But to his disappointment, Esquire ran just one full-page image of Attie's (another was later used as the cover of at least one paperback edition of the novella). Attie's photo was the first-ever visual depiction of Holly Golightly—who is seen laughing and smiling in a nightclub. The novella appeared in the November 1958 issue. Shortly afterward, a collection of the novella and three short stories by Capote was published by Random House — and the glowing reviews caused sales of the Esquire issue to skyrocket. Both Attie and Brodovitch went on to work with Capote on other projects – Attie on Brooklyn Heights: A Personal Memoir, and Brodovitch on Observations, both published in 1959.

In 2021, Esquire re-ran the novella online, reuniting the text with many of Attie's original images.

The collection has been reprinted several times with the other short stories, "House of Flowers", "A Diamond Guitar" and "A Christmas Memory". The novella itself has been included in other Capote collections.

Capote's original typed manuscript was offered for sale by a New Hampshire auction house in April 2013. It was sold to Igor Sosin, a Russian billionaire entrepreneur, for US$306,000 (equivalent to US$423,000 in 2025). Sosin said he planned to display it publicly in Moscow and Monte Carlo.

== Literary significance and reception ==
In "Breakfast at Sally Bowles", Ingrid Norton of Open Letters Monthly pointed out Capote's debt to Christopher Isherwood, one of his mentors, in creating the character of Holly Golightly: "Breakfast at Tiffany's is in many ways Capote's personal crystallization of Isherwood's Sally Bowles."

Truman Capote's aunt, Marie Rudisill, notes that Holly is a kindred spirit of Miss Lily Jane Bobbit, the central character of his short story "Children on Their Birthdays". She observes that both characters are "unattached, unconventional wanderers, dreamers in pursuit of some ideal of happiness".

Capote said Golightly was the favorite of his characters.

The novella's prose style prompted Norman Mailer to call Capote "the most perfect writer of my generation," adding that he "would not have changed two words in Breakfast at Tiffany's".

== Adaptations ==
=== Film ===
The novella was loosely adapted into the 1961 movie Breakfast at Tiffany's starring Audrey Hepburn and directed by Blake Edwards. The movie was transposed to 1960 rather than the 1940s, the period of the novella. In addition to this, at the end of the film the protagonist and Holly fall in love and stay together, whereas in the novella there is no love affair whatsoever – Holly just leaves the United States and the narrator has no idea what happened to her since then, except for a photograph of a wood carving found years later in Africa which bears a striking resemblance to Holly. In addition, there are many other changes, including major omissions, to the plot and main character in the film from the novella. Capote originally envisioned Marilyn Monroe as Holly, and lobbied the studio for her, but the film was done at Paramount, and she was still under contract with Twentieth Century Fox.

=== Musical ===
A musical version of Breakfast at Tiffany's (also known as Holly Golightly) premiered in 1966 in Boston. The initial performances were panned by the critics and despite a rewrite by Edward Albee, it closed after four previews and never officially opened.

=== Television ===
Three years after the musical adaptation, Stefanie Powers and Jack Kruschen starred in another adaptation, Holly Golightly (1969), an unsold ABC sitcom pilot. Kruschen's role was based on Joe Bell, a major character in Capote's novella who was omitted from the film version.

=== Plays ===
Two adaptations of the novella into stage plays have been directed by Sean Mathias. The first production was written by Samuel Adamson and was presented in 2009 at the Theatre Royal Haymarket in London, starring Anna Friel as Holly Golightly and Joseph Cross as William "Fred" Parsons.

The second version was written by Richard Greenberg for a 2013 Broadway production at the Cort Theatre, starring Emilia Clarke as Holly Golightly, Cory Michael Smith as Fred, and George Wendt as Joe Bell. The production ran from March 20, 2013 to April 21, 2013, totaling 55 performances (17 previews and 38 regular performances). The Greenberg play was produced in the UK in 2016, called "a play with music". It ran at the Theatre Royal Haymarket in the West End from June to September 2016, with Pixie Lott starring as Holly Golightly.
