= Westlake, Daly City, California =

Neighborhood in Daly City, California, United States

Coordinates: 37°41′52″N 122°28′50″W

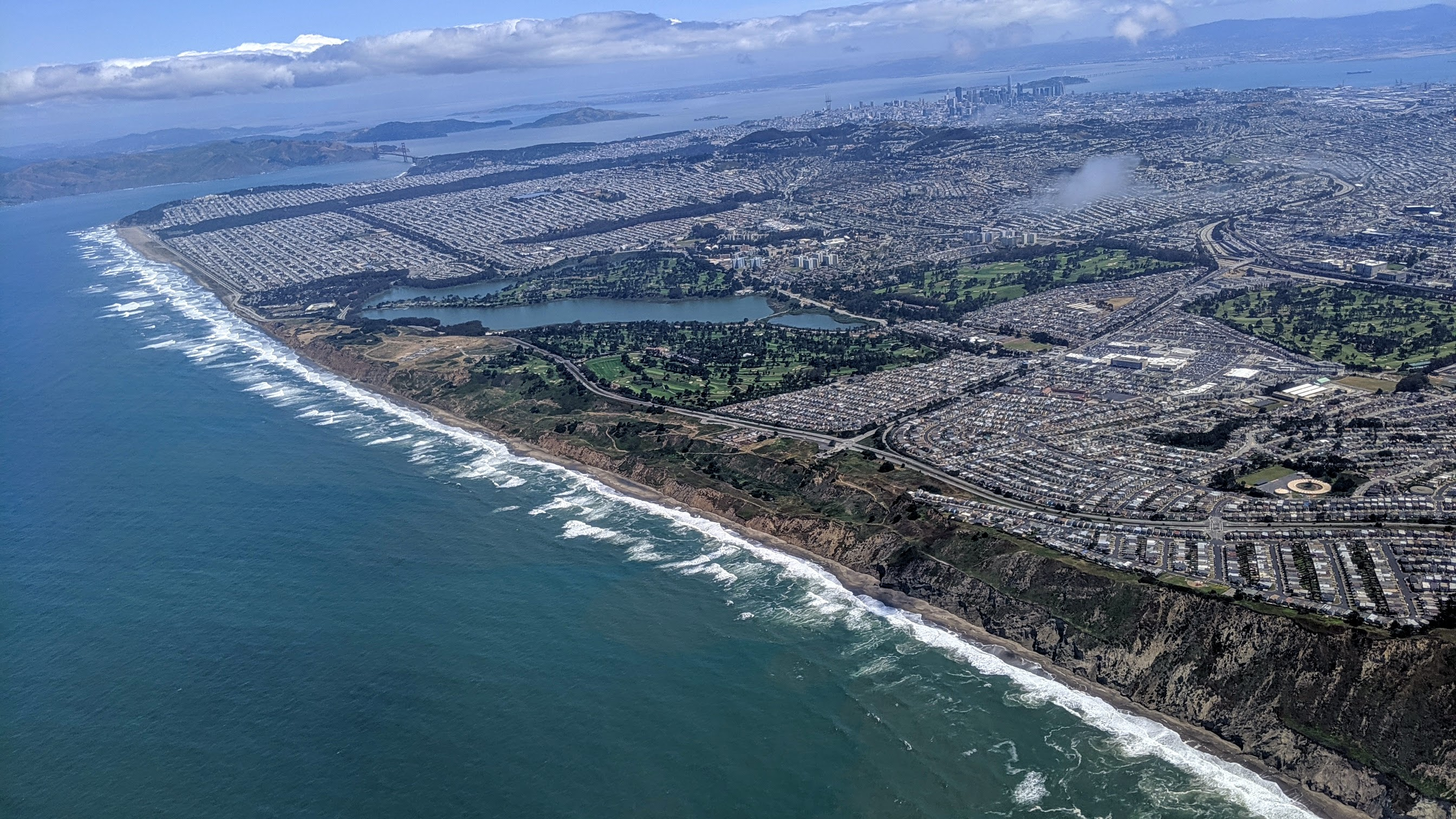
Aerial view of Westlake (right foreground) with Lake Merced and more of San Francisco behind

The Westlake District of Daly City, California, was originally created as one of the first post-World War II white-only suburbs in the United States, though for several decades now is as ethnically diverse as the City of Daly City itself. Located just south of San Francisco, Westlake in its early years had frequently been compared to Levittown, New York, the first major large-scale postwar middle-class white-only housing development in the U.S.

After World War II moderate-cost housing began in Daly City as well as in most other Bay Area communities. A San Francisco builder, Henry Doelger, purchased some 600 acres of sand dunes and cabbage patches that occupied much of the land between the original Daly City's westerly edge to the ocean. He built a community called Westlake, which was annexed to Daly City in 1948.

Westlake is notable for its monostylistic architecture, created by a core team of designers to encompass nearly every building in the development. For this reason, Westlake has become an icon for architectural blandness, exemplified by its endless rows of boxy houses, which were the inspiration for Malvina Reynolds’ folk song "Little Boxes," an anti-conformity anthem in the 1960s.

Despite its detractors, Westlake has enjoyed considerable publicity over the course of its 60-year history. In the 1950s, the neighborhood's architecturally innovative schools began appearing in national magazines, such as Life, Architectural Forum, and Fortune. In the 1970s, one national magazine named Westlake one of the ten best suburbs in America. In 2003, the New York Times ran an article about Henry Doelger and his impact on history, citing Westlake as one of his most iconic neighborhoods.
