= Breakfast at Tiffany's (musical) =

Musical

- Studio Recording
- Music: Bob Merrill
- Lyrics: Bob Merrill
- Book: Edward Albee
- Basis: Truman Capote novella and 1961 film of the same name
- Productions: 1966 Broadway (did not officially open); 2013 London

Breakfast at Tiffany's is a musical with music and lyrics by Bob Merrill and a book originally by Abe Burrows but rewritten during pre-Broadway tryouts by Edward Albee. It is based on the 1958 Truman Capote novella and 1961 film of the same name about a free spirit named Holly Golightly.

After tryouts in Philadelphia and Boston, and only four previews on Broadway in 1966, the show was closed by producer David Merrick at a total financial loss. Its only revival was a staged concert in 2013 at a 200-seat venue in London. A studio recording was released in 2001.

The musical is one of the most notorious fiascos in Broadway history. William Goldman called it a "legendary production" meaning "a certain kind of Broadway show that by virtue of its birth agonies and the resulting publicity achieves an immortality most productions never dare aspire to." (Other examples he gave were Buttrio Square and Portofino.)

== Production history ==
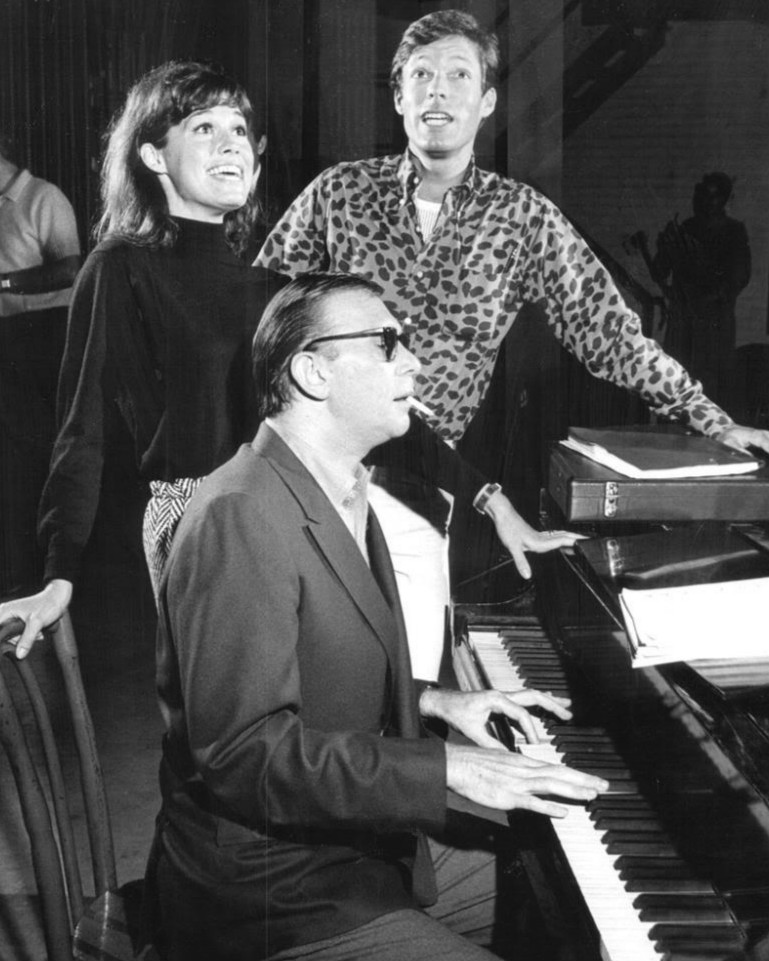
Mary Tyler Moore and Richard Chamberlain rehearsing, with Bob Merrill at the piano (1966)

The original cast included Mary Tyler Moore, Richard Chamberlain, Sally Kellerman, Larry Kert and Priscilla Lopez. The production was designed by Oliver Smith, directed by Joseph Anthony and choreographed by Michael Kidd with assistance from Tony Mordente, and produced by David Merrick. Despite the impressive list of collaborators, the project never gelled. It underwent constant and massive changes in its script and score during out-of-town tryouts. The original book by Abe Burrows was seen in Philadelphia, then scrapped completely, and Edward Albee, an unlikely choice, was hired to re-write before a Boston tryout. Burrows was the original director but left when Albee was brought in. He was replaced by Joseph Anthony. On a daily basis, the cast was given new material hours before curtain time, and the piece was overly long, running nearly four hours. Burrows's departure resulted in low morale among cast members, and Moore was convinced that Merrick planned to fire her soon after opening night.

Its original title, Holly Golightly, was changed when it started previews on December 12, 1966, on Broadway at the Majestic Theatre. Despite a healthy advance sale and much audience anticipation, it closed four nights later without having officially opened. Merrick placed an infamous ad in The New York Times, announcing that he shut down the production "rather than subject the drama critics and the public to an excruciatingly boring evening."

In 2013, the musical was revived for the first time, using Burrows's book, under the title Holly Golightly, at the 200-seat Lilian Baylis Studio at Sadler's Wells Theatre in London, as part of Ian Marshall Fisher's "Lost Musicals" staged concert series. One reviewer wrote: "the show never seems to come alive [and though] worth excavating out of interest in the form, it is not clear whether it is stageworthy."

== Recordings ==
Before closing, a live recording was made of the musical numbers, excerpts of which eventually were released on LP. In 2001, a studio recording with Faith Prince, John Schneider, Hal Linden, Patrick Cassidy, and original cast member Kellerman was released on the Original Cast label. This recording includes musical numbers that were seen in both the tryouts and in the New York production.

== Musical numbers ==
Act I

- "Holly Golightly" - Jeff
- "Breakfast at Tiffany's" - Holly
- "When Daddy Comes Home" - Holly
- "Freddy Chant" - Holly
- "Lament for Ten Men" - Holly and Guests
- "Lament for Ten Men" (Reprise) - Holly's Guests
- "Home for Wayward Girls" - Holly and Mag
- "Who Needs Her?" - Jeff
- "You've Never Kissed Her" - Doc
- "You've Never Kissed Her (Reprise)" - Jeff
- "Lulamae" - Doc, Jeff, and Holly

Act II

- "Who Needs Her?" (Reprise) - Holly and Jeff
- Dance - Holly and Three Bar Patrons
- "Stay With Me" - Carlos
- "I'm Not the Girl" - Holly and Jeff
- "Grade 'A' Treatment" - Holly and Carlos
- "Ciao, Compare" - Giovanni and His Girlfriends
- "Breakfast at Tiffany's (Reprise)" - Holly
- "Better Together" - Jeff
- "Same Mistakes" - Holly
- "Holly Golightly" (Reprise) - Jeff

== 2013 musical adaptation ==
A new version, based on Capote's novella, titled Breakfast at Tiffany's, was adapted by Richard Greenberg (book) with "songs from the era as well as original music by Grant Olding". According to The Telegraph, "The show has been described as a play with songs." It debuted on Broadway in 2013, then later produced at the Curve Leicester in March 2016, and then toured in the UK and Ireland from 2 May to 11 June 2016, with Pixie Lott, Emily Atack and Verity Rushworth sharing the role of "Holly Golightly". The show played the West End at the Theatre Royal Haymarket 30 June to 17 September 2016.
