= Knee Deep in the Blues =

Single by Marty Robbins

from the album Marty's Greatest Hits
- B-side: "The Same Two Lips"
- Released: December 17, 1956
- Recorded: December 4, 1956
- Studio: Music City Recording, Nashville, Tennessee
- Genre: Country
- Length: 2:12
- Label: Columbia
- Songwriter: Melvin Endsley
- Producer: Don Law

Marty Robbins singles chronology
"Singing the Blues" (1956)	"Knee Deep in the Blues" (1956)	"A White Sport Coat" (1957)

"Knee Deep in the Blues" is a song written by Melvin Endsley and recorded by American country music artist Marty Robbins. It was released on December 17, 1956, as the lead single from his compilation album Marty's Greatest Hits. The song reached number three on the Country Singles charts.

== Guy Mitchell version ==
"Knee Deep in the Blues"

Single by Guy Mitchell
- B-side: "Take Me Back Baby"
- Released: December 17, 1956
- Recorded: November 15, 1956
- Studio: Columbia 7th Ave, New York City
- Genre: Traditional pop
- Length: 2:08
- Label: Columbia
- Songwriter: Melvin Endsley

Guy Mitchell singles chronology
"Singing the Blues" (1956)	"Knee Deep in the Blues" (1956)	"Rock-a-billy" (1957)

Guy Mitchell released a cover version of the song the same year that reached number 16 on the Billboard Hot 100. In the UK, it reached number three on the UK singles chart.

== Cover versions ==
- The Derailers on their 1999 album, Full Western Dress
- The International Submarine Band on their 1968 album, Safe at Home
- Del McCoury on his 1988 album, Don't Stop the Music
- Carl Smith on his 1968 album, Country on My Mind
- Tommy Steele in 1957, which went to number 15 on the UK charts
