= She Wears Red Feathers =

1952 single by Guy Mitchell

Single by Guy Mitchell with Mitch Miller and his Orchestra and Chorus
- B-side: "Pretty Little Black-Eyed Susie"
- Published: June 5, 1952
- Released: December 26, 1952
- Recorded: July 2, 1952
- Venue: New York City
- Genre: Pop
- Length: 3:06
- Label: Columbia Records
- Songwriter: Bob Merrill
- Producer: Mitch Miller

"She Wears Red Feathers" was a popular song written by Bob Merrill and published in 1952.

== Background and reception ==
The best-known recording of the song was made by Guy Mitchell in 1952 and was a No. 1 single in the UK Singles Chart in March 1953 for four weeks. It was only the sixth single to reach the top spot in the UK.

Mitchell's recording was made for Columbia in New York on July 2, 1952, with Mitch Miller and his Orchestra and Chorus. It was released in his native America on December 26 that year as a 78 and 45 rpm single. There, it peaked at No. 19 on the Billboard charts.

In the UK Mitchell's single first charted on February 13, 1953, and reached No. 1 in its fifth week. It was the only charting recording of the song. "She Wears Red Feathers" first appeared on the UK's sheet music charts on February 21, 1953, and peaked at No. 3. February 1953 saw the only three recordings of the song issued in the UK: these were by Guy Mitchell, The Ray Ellington Quartet with The Peter Knight Singers and Donald Peers with The Kordites. In May Mitchell's version was issued in the new 45 rpm format, having initially only been available on 78 rpm.

In February 1982 Mitchell rerecorded the song for Triad International Productions at Audio Media Studios in Nashville, Tennessee, alongside a number of other rerecordings of his earlier material. These recordings were released by Arcade on The World of Guy Mitchell album and have been since been reissued on several albums.

== Other recordings ==
- Alberto Semprini, on pianoforte with rhythm accompaniment, recorded it in London as the first song of the medley "Dancing to the piano (No. 20) - Hit medley of quick-steps" along with "Wild Roses" and "Don't Let the Stars Get in Your Eyes". The medley was released by EMI on the His Master's Voice label (catalogue number B 10457).
- The band Mud also released a cover of this song.
- Another cover, performed in a cabaret club, featured in the opening scene of the 1989 film Scandal.
