= Brownstone (musical) =

- Music: Peter Larson
- Lyrics: Josh Rubins
- Book: Josh Rubins; Andrew Cadiff
- Productions: 1979 Playwrights Horizons workshop 1986 Off-Broadway

Brownstone is a musical written by Josh Rubins (book and lyrics), Andrew Cadiff (book) and Peter Larson (music). It centers on a group of five people living in a brownstone apartment in New York City.

Brownstone's characters include Claudia, a young lady getting over a breakup; Howard, a writer struggling with his current novel; his wife Mary, who desperately wants children; Joan, a big-time lawyer whose boyfriend lives in Maine; and Stuart, a bright-eyed youngster just excited to finally be in New York. The musical is sung-through with little dialogue.

== Production history ==
The show was workshopped in 1979 at Playwrights Horizons in New York City. It then was produced at the Hudson Guild Theater in New York City in June 1984. Directed by Cadiff, the cast featured Maureen McGovern, Kimberly Farr, Loni Ackerman, Ralph Bruneau, and Lenny Wolpe.

It opened Off-Broadway at the Roundabout Theatre Company's Union Square Theatre on October 8, 1986 and closed on December 6, 1986 after 69 performances. The director was Cadiff with musical staging by Don Bondi. The original cast included Liz Callaway (Claudia), Rex Smith (Stuart), Ben Harney (Howard), Ernestine Jackson (Mary), and Kimberly Farr (Joan).

The musical ran at the Berkshire Theatre Festival, Stockbridge, Massachusetts in August 2002.

== Recordings ==
An original cast album was recorded in 2003 on Original Cast (record label). The album cast includes Rebecca Luker (Mary), Liz Callaway (Claudia) and Brian D'Arcy James (Howard), as well as Debbie Gravitte (Joan) and Kevin Reed (Stuart). “Since You Stayed Here”, a ballad from Act II of the musical, has been recorded by, among others, Bette Midler, Michael Crawford, and Dionne Warwick.

== Awards ==
Richard Rodgers Development Award (1984).
