= Sparrow in the Treetop =

Single by Guy Mitchell

from the album Guy's Greatest Hits
- B-side: "Christopher Columbus"
- Released: 1951
- Recorded: 1951
- Genre: Traditional pop
- Length: 3:17
- Label: Columbia
- Songwriter(s): Bob Merrill

Guy Mitchell singles chronology
"You're Just in Love" (1951)	"Sparrow in the Treetop" (1951)	"Christopher Columbus" (1951)

"Sparrow in the Treetop" is a popular song written by Bob Merrill. The song was published in 1951.

== 1951 recordings ==
Charting versions of the song were made by:

- Guy Mitchell, who recorded the most popular version, reaching number 8 on the Billboard chart.
- Bing Crosby and The Andrews Sisters, recorded February 8, 1951, also reaching number 8 on the Billboard chart.
- Rex Allen, who reached number 28 on the Billboard chart. The Allen version crossed over to Billboard's Most Played Juke Box/Folk chart, peaking at number 10.
