= Guy Mitchell =

American singer and actor (1927–1999)

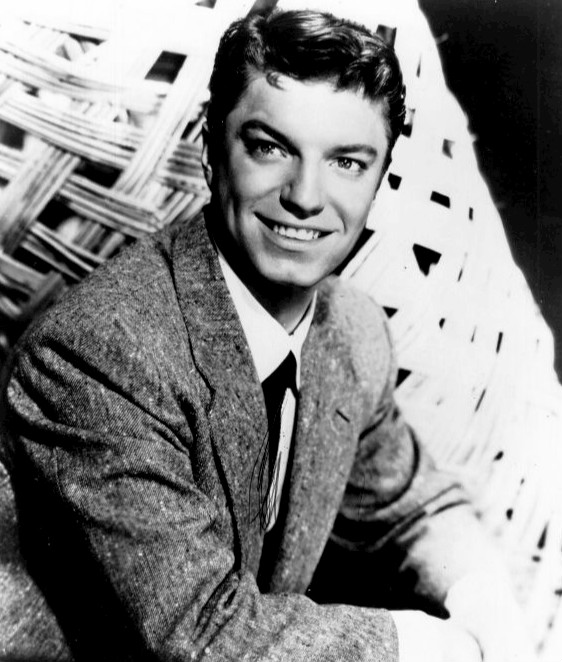
- Mitchell in a publicity photo in 1957
- Born: Albert George Cernik; February 22, 1927; Detroit, Michigan, U.S.
- Died: July 1, 1999 (aged 72); Las Vegas, Nevada, U.S.
- Occupations: Singer; actor
- Spouses: Jackie Loughery (m. 1952; div. 1955) Elsa Sørensen (m. 1956; div. 1965) Kathryn Ann Evensen (m. 1966; div. 1966) Betty Jeane Ruth (m. 1974)
- Musical career
- Genres: Big band; traditional pop; rock and roll; country
- Instruments: Vocals; guitar
- Years active: 1947–1999 (as a musician)
- Labels: Decca; King; Columbia; Philips
- Military service
- Allegiance: United States
- Branch: United States Navy
- Service years: 1945–1947
- Conflicts: World War II

Guy Mitchell (born Albert George Cernik; February 22, 1927 – July 1, 1999) was an American singer and actor, who was successful in his homeland, the UK, and Australia. He sold 44 million records, including six million-selling singles. His hits included "My Heart Cries for You", "Heartaches by the Number" and "Singing the Blues".

In the fall of 1957, Mitchell starred on the eponymous ABC's The Guy Mitchell Show. He also acted in a number of films, such as Those Redheads From Seattle and Red Garters, and appeared on TV as George Romack on the 1961 NBC western detective series Whispering Smith, and on the 1990 BBC television drama series Your Cheatin' Heart.

== Life and career ==
Guy Mitchell was born Albert George Cernik to Croatian immigrants in Detroit, Michigan. The family moved to Los Angeles when he was 11, where he was signed by Warner Brothers Pictures to be a child star, and performed on KFWB radio. However, his career as a child star failed to take off, and the family moved to San Francisco where, after leaving school, he worked as a saddlemaker, supplementing his income by singing. Dude Martin, who had a country music broadcast in San Francisco, hired him for his band.

Cernik served in the United States Navy for two years in World War II, then sang with Carmen Cavallaro's big band. In 1947, Cernik recorded for Decca with Cavallaro's band, but left due to food poisoning. He went next to New York City and made records for King Records as Al Grant (one, "Cabaret", appeared in the Variety charts). He won on the radio show Arthur Godfrey's Talent Scouts in 1949 as a soloist.

Mitch Miller, in charge of talent at Columbia Records, noticed Cernik in 1950. Cernik joined Columbia and took his new stage name at Miller's urging. Miller had originally intended to record a sentimental ballad called "My Heart Cries for You" and "The Roving Kind" with Frank Sinatra; however, Sinatra was not interested, and rejected the songs selected for him to record that day. Given that Miller had already booked the musicians for the recording session, he invited Cernik to come in the evening as a replacement to record the songs. The recording went well, and Miller then told him that he should change his name as Miller could not pronounce the name Cernik. Initially reluctant, he then took Miller's name Mitchell, and added Guy, as he liked to say "Hi, Guy" in reply to other people's "Hello", and became Guy Mitchell for the record release. "My Heart Cries for You" became Mitchell's first hit, reaching No. 2 on the U.S. Billboard charts.

After "My Heart Cries for You", Mitchell was propelled into international fame and would be a popular star throughout the 1950s. Mitchell scored more international hits during the 1950s. His biggest hit was "Singing the Blues", which topped the charts in the U.S. for ten consecutive weeks and topped the charts in the UK for three non-consecutive weeks.

In the 1950s and 1960s, Mitchell acted in such movies as Those Redheads From Seattle (1953) and Red Garters (1954). Mitchell also had various acting roles on television. He appeared in "Choose a Victim", a 1961 episode of Thriller, and in "The Case of the Guilty Clients", a 1961 episode of Perry Mason.

Mitchell's last major hit would be "Heartaches by the Number". The song became one of the last number-one singles of the 1950s and the last number-one single of Mitchell's career. Mitchell's popularity subsequently waned in the 1960s, although he continued to record songs for a number of labels. In 1990, he appeared in several episodes of the BBC drama series Your Cheatin' Heart as the fictional country singer Jim Bob O'May, singing several standards, including his own hit "Singing the Blues".

== Death ==
Mitchell died on July 1, 1999, aged 72, at Desert Springs Hospital in Las Vegas, Nevada of complications from cancer surgery.

== Tribute ==
In 2007, to commemorate what would have been his 80th birthday, the English division of Sony BMG released The Essential Collection CD. His song "Heartaches by the Number" was part of the soundtrack of the 2010 video game Fallout: New Vegas.

== Singles discography ==
Year	Single (A-side, B-side) Both sides from same album except where indicated	Chart positions						Album
Year	Single (A-side, B-side) Both sides from same album except where indicated	US	CB	UK	US Country	US R&B	AU	Album
1950	"My Heart Cries For You" (Gold record) /	2					1	Guy's Greatest Hits
1950	"The Roving Kind"	4					2	Guy's Greatest Hits
1951	"You're Just In Love" b/w "Marrying For Love"; Both sides with Rosemary Clooney	24						Non-album tracks
1951	"The House of Singing Bamboo" (with Rosemary Clooney) /						3	Non-album tracks
1951	"The Place Where I Worship" (with Rosemary Clooney)						6	Non-album tracks
1951	"Sparrow In The Treetop" /	8					3	Guy's Greatest Hits
1951	"Christopher Columbus"	27						Guy's Greatest Hits
1951	"A Beggar In Love" /						6	Non-album tracks
1951	"Unless"	17					3	Non-album tracks
1951	"My Truly, Truly Fair" (Gold record) b/w "Who Knows Love" (Non-album track)	2					1	Guy's Greatest Hits
1951	"Belle Belle My Liberty Belle" /	9					4	Guy's Greatest Hits
1951	"Sweetheart Of Yesterday"	23					12	Non-album tracks
1951	"There's Always Room At Our House" /	20					8	Non-album tracks
1951	"I Can't Help It"	28						Non-album tracks
1952	"(There's A Pawnshop On The Corner In) Pittsburgh, Pennsylvania" (Gold record) b/w "The Doll With A Sawdust Heart" (Non-album track)	4					2	Guy's Greatest Hits
1952	"Wimmin'" b/w "We Won't Live In A Castle"		27				17	Non-album tracks
1952	"A Little Kiss Goodnight" b/w "Gentle Johnny"; Both sides with Doris Day							Non-album tracks
1952	"The Day Of Jubilo" /	26					4	Non-album tracks
1952	"You'll Never Be Mine"		24					Non-album tracks
1952	"Feet Up (Pat Him on the Po-Po)" b/w "Jenny Kissed Me" (Non-album track)	14	18	2			2	Guy's Greatest Hits
1952	"'Cause I Love You, That's A-Why" b/w "Train Of Love"; Both sides with Mindy Carson	24	25				8	Non-album tracks
1952	"Why Should I Go Home" b/w "Don't Rob Another Man's Castle"							Non-album tracks
1953	"She Wears Red Feathers" /	19	14	1			5	Guy's Greatest Hits
1953	"Pretty Little Black Eyed Susie"			2			17	Non-album tracks
1953	"I Want You For A Sunbeam" b/w "So Am I"; Both sides with Mindy Carson							Non-album tracks
1953	"Wise Man Or Fool" b/w "Walkin' and Wond'rin"							Non-album tracks
1953	"Tell Us Where The Good Times Are" b/w "There's Nothing As Sweet As My Baby"; Both sides with Mindy Carson	23						Non-album tracks
1953	"Look At That Girl" b/w "Hannah Lee"			1				Non-album tracks
1953	"Chicka Boom" /		16	4			14	Non-album tracks
1953	"Cloud Lucky Seven"			2			19	Non-album tracks
1953	"Sippin' Soda" /			11			5	Non-album tracks
1953	"Strollin' Blues"						18	Non-album tracks
1954	"The Cuff Of My Shirt" b/w "Got A Hole In My Sweater"			9				Non-album tracks
1954	"A Dime and A Dollar" b/w "Tear Down The Mountains"			8				Non-album tracks
1954	"There Was Once A Man" b/w "My Heaven and Earth"							Non-album tracks
1954	"I Met The Cutest Little Eyeful (At The Eiffel Tower)" b/w "Gee, But You Gotta Come Home"							Non-album tracks
1955	"Nobody Home" b/w "Zoo Baby"							Non-album tracks
1955	"Man Overboard" b/w "(Otto Drives Me Crazy) Otto's Gotta Go"							Non-album tracks
1955	"Too Late" b/w "Let Us Be Sweethearts Over Again"							Non-album tracks
1956	"Ninety Nine Years (Dead Or Alive)" b/w "Perfume, Candy and Flowers"	23	19				26	Non-album tracks
1956	"When Blinky Blows" /						22	Non-album tracks
1956	"Belonging"						25	Non-album tracks
1956	"Give Me A Carriage With Eight White Horses" b/w "I Used To Yate Ya"						42	Non-album tracks
1956	"Finders Keepers" b/w "I'd Like To Say A Few Words About Texas"							Non-album tracks
1956	"Singing The Blues" /	1	1	1		4	1	Guy's Greatest Hits
1956	"Crazy With Love"	53					42	Non-album track
1957	"Knee Deep In The Blues" /	16	15	3			13	Guy's Greatest Hits
1957	"Take Me Back Baby"	47	38				30	Non-album track
1957	"Rock-A-Billy" b/w "Hoot Owl" (Non-album track)	10	13	1			10	Guy's Greatest Hits
1957	"In The Middle Of A Dark Dark Night" /			25			49	Non-album tracks
1957	"Sweet Stuff"	83	51	flip				Non-album tracks
1957	"Call Rosie On The Phone" b/w "Cure For The Blues"			17				Non-album tracks
1958	"The Lord Made A Peanut" b/w "(I'm Walkin' Down A) One Way Street"						56	Non-album tracks
1958	"C'mon Let's Go" b/w "The Unbeliever"						71	Non-album tracks
1958	"Till We're Engaged" b/w "Hey, Madame"							Non-album tracks
1958	"Honey Brown Eyes" b/w "Hangin' Around"						92	Non-album tracks
1959	"Butterfly Doll" b/w "Let It Shine, Let It Shine"						87	Non-album tracks
1959	"Half As Much" b/w "Guilty Heart"							Non-album tracks
1959	"Pride O'Dixie" b/w "Alias Jesse James"							Non-album tracks
1959	"I'm Gonna Leave You Now" (with The Easy Riders) b/w "Loosen Up Lucy"							Non-album tracks
1959	"Heartaches By The Number" b/w "Two"	1	1	5		19	3	Non-album tracks
1960	"The Same Old Me" b/w "Build My Gallows High" (from Songs Of The Open Spaces 10" LP)	51	103					Non-album tracks
1960	"Symphony of Spring" b/w "Cry Hurtin' Heart" (Non-album track)							A Guy in Love
1960	"My Shoes Keep Walking Back To You" b/w "Silver Moon Upon The Golden Sands"	45	106				63	Sunshine Guitar
1960	"Sunshine Guitar" b/w "Ridin' Around In The Rain"							Sunshine Guitar
1961	"Your Goodnight Kiss" b/w "Follow Me"	106					100	Non-album tracks
1961	"Divorce" b/w "I'll Just Pretend"							Non-album tracks
1961	"Soft Rain" b/w "Big Big Change"							Non-album tracks
1962	"Charlie's Shoes" b/w "Rusty Old Halo"	110	143					Non-album tracks
1962	"Go Tiger Go" b/w "If You Ever Go Away (I'll Go Out and Eat Some Worms)"	101	123					Non-album tracks
1963	"Have I Told You Lately That I Love You" b/w "Blue Violet"							Non-album tracks
1966	"The Best Thing That Ever Happened To Me" b/w "If I Had My Life To Live Over"							Non-album tracks
1967	"Traveling Shoes" b/w "Every Night Is A Lifetime"				51			Traveling Shoes
1968	"Alabam" b/w "Irene Good-Bye"				61			Traveling Shoes
1968	"Frisco Line" b/w "Singing The Blues" (from Traveling Shoes)				71			Singin' Up A Storm
1969	"Get It Over" b/w "Just Wish You'd Maybe Change Your Mind"							Singin' Up A Storm
1970	"Singing The Blues" b/w "Heartaches By The Number" (from Heartaches By The Number)							Traveling Shoes

== Notable songs ==
- "My Heart Cries for You" (1950)
- "The Roving Kind" (1951)
- "My Truly, Truly Fair" (1951)
- "Sparrow In The Treetop" (1951)
- "Pittsburgh, Pennsylvania" (1952)
- "She Wears Red Feathers" (1953)
- "Belle, Belle, My Liberty Belle" (1951)
- "Feet Up (Pat Him On The Po-po)" (1952)
- "Heartaches by the Number" (1959)
- "Knee Deep in the Blues" (1957)
- "Look At That Girl" (1953)
- "Ninety Nine Years (Dead or Alive)" (1956)
- "Pretty Little Black Eyed Susie" (1953)
- "Rock-a-Billy" (1957)
- "The Same Old Me" (1960)
- "Singing the Blues" (1956)
- "The Roving Kind" (1950)
- "Cloud Lucky Seven" (1953)
- "Unless" (1951)

== Re-recorded songs ==
In February 1982, Mitchell re-recorded 18 of his popular songs with new musical backings (in stereo) at the Audio Media Studio in Nashville, Tennessee for Bulldog Records (BDL 2041 in the UK). The album was entitled 20 Golden Pieces of Guy Mitchell (not to be confused with 20 Golden Greats by Mitchell, released in 1979). The songs on the album are:-

Side 1

1. "Pittsburgh, Pennsylvania"
2. "Feet Up (Pat Him on the Popo)"
3. "Heartaches by the Number"
4. "She Wears Red Feathers"
5. "Sparrow in the Tree Top"
6. "Sippin' Soda"
7. "Rockabilly"
8. "Cuff of my Shirt"
9. "Cloud Lucky Seven"
10. "Chicka Boom"

Side 2

1. "Pretty Little Black Eyed Susie"
2. "Side by Side" (not previously recorded by Mitchell)
3. "Music, Music, Music" (not previously recorded by Mitchell)
4. "The Rovin' Kind"
5. "My Heart Cries for You"
6. "My Shoes Keep Walking Back"
7. "Call Rosie on the Phone"
8. "My Truly, Truly Fair"
9. "Knee Deep in the Blues"
10. "Singin' the Blues"
