= Henry Doelger =

American businessman

- Born: June 23, 1896; San Francisco, California, U.S.
- Died: July 23, 1978 (aged 82); Borgaro Torinese, Italy
- Occupations: Housing developer, builder
- Known for: Doelger Homes
- Spouse: Thelma Doelger

Henry Doelger (pronounced DOLE-jer; June 23, 1896 – July 23, 1978) was an American real estate developer and builder known for the creation of large low-cost housing tracts in San Francisco and Daly City. He worked alongside his brothers to form the company Doelger Homes.

== Biography ==
Doelger was born on June 23, 1896, in San Francisco, California; birthed behind his parents' German bakery. After his father's death when he was 12 years old, Doelger left school in the 8th grade in order to help support his family. Henry Doelger went into business with his two brothers Frank and John Jr, eventually becoming a major real estate developer in San Francisco.

The 1932 art deco "Doelger Building" on Judah Street was designated in 2013 as an official landmark by the City of San Francisco.

During the 1940s, Doelger built large sections of San Francisco's Sunset District, in the same part of the city where he had set up his headquarters since the 1930s. In the 1940s, Edward Hageman worked as the architect on the Doelger Homes Sunset District project. In 1947, Doelger and his associates started building what is now known as the Westlake district in Daly City. This is one of the earliest examples of a large-tract suburb and manifestation of urban sprawl.

Life Magazine featured photographs of the numerous rows of houses in the 1950s, which were immortalized in the song Little Boxes by Malvina Reynolds.

Doelger died on July 23, 1978, in Borgaro Torinese, at the age of 82 while traveling in Italy.

== See also ==
- Oliver Rousseau, another developer associated with San Francisco's Sunset District
