= Pittsburgh, Pennsylvania (song) =

Single by Guy Mitchell
- B-side: "The Doll With a Sawdust Heart"
- Released: 1952
- Genre: Pop
- Length: 2:50
- Label: Columbia
- Songwriter(s): Bob Merrill
- Producer(s): Mitch Miller

Guy Mitchell singles chronology
"I Can't Help It" (1951)	"Pittsburgh, Pennsylvania" (1952)	"Day of Jubilo" (1952)

"Pittsburgh, Pennsylvania" also known as "There's a Pawn Shop on the Corner" or "There's a Pawn Shop on the Corner in Pittsburgh, Pennsylvania" is a traditional pop song, written by Bob Merrill in 1952.

The best-known version was recorded by Guy Mitchell on January 15, 1952. This recording was released by Columbia Records with the flip side "Doll with a Sawdust Heart." It first reached the Billboard chart on March 7, 1952, and lasted 17 weeks on the chart, peaking at number 6.

Bing Crosby sang the song on a number of occasions on his radio show in 1952, and one of these versions has since been released on CD. In 1973, Keld Heick released a Danish version, "Der' En Gammel Marskandiser På Hjørnet Af Ranunkelvej," as an A-side EP. The song was remastered in 2005 by Parlophone Denmark. Mickey Katz released a comedic parody titled "Schvitzburgh, Pennsylvania."

The song tells the story of a relatively poor man who falls in love with a beautiful woman and convinces her he is rich by taking her out to fancy places, paying for it all by pawning all he has. As the song opens, he is out of things to pawn.

== Appearances in other media ==
The song was referenced in Robert A. Heinlein's Time Enough for Love. The Senior sings a verse while he is in rejuvenation.
