= Malvina Reynolds =

American singer and songwriter

- Reynolds photographed by Diana Davies, c. 1965

Background information
- Born: Malvina Milder; August 23, 1900; San Francisco, California, U.S.
- Died: March 17, 1978 (aged 77) Berkeley, California, U.S.
- Genres: Folk music, blues
- Occupations: Singer, songwriter, political activist
- Instruments: Vocals, acoustic guitar
- Label: Columbia/CBS Records

Malvina Reynolds (née Milder; August 23, 1900 – March 17, 1978) was an American folk/blues singer-songwriter and political activist, best known for her songwriting, particularly the songs "Little Boxes", "What Have They Done to the Rain" and "Morningtown Ride".

== Early life and education ==
Malvina Milder was born on August 23, 1900 on Folsom Street in San Francisco, California, United States.

Her parents were David and Abagail Milder, Jewish immigrants. Her mother was born in modern Ukraine and her father was born in Hungary. They became socialists when Reynolds "was a little girl", to which she attributes her lifetime proximity to the socialist movement in the United States. They opposed involvement in World War I.

As a child, she took violin lessons and "fooled around" with pianos, writing music occasionally.

Reynolds earned her Bachelor of Arts and Master of Arts in English from the University of California, Berkeley, where she remarked that she got "all the degrees possible". She earned a doctorate there, finishing her dissertation in 1938.

== Career ==
Reynolds worked as a milliner and "hated it". She also worked as a telephone operator and a social worker.

Though she played violin in a dance band in her twenties, Reynolds began her songwriting career later in life. Reynolds claims that as soon as folk music came to the forefront, she knew it was for her.

She was in her late forties when she met Earl Robinson, Pete Seeger, and other folk singers and songwriters. She returned to school at UC Berkeley, where she studied music theory. Reynolds went on to write several popular songs, including "Little Boxes" (1962), recorded by Seeger, Chilean singer Víctor Jara, and others, "What Have They Done to the Rain" (1962), recorded by the Searchers, the Seekers, Marianne Faithfull, Melanie Safka and Joan Baez (about nuclear fallout), "It Isn't Nice" (1964) (a civil rights anthem), "Turn Around" (1959) (about children growing up, later sung by Harry Belafonte), and "There's a Bottom Below" (about depression). Reynolds was also a noted composer of children's songs, including "Love Is Something (Magic Penny)" and "Morningtown Ride" (1957), a top-5 UK single (December 1966) recorded by the Seekers.

In 1962, Reynolds composed her most famous song, "Little Boxes", which was made famous by her friend Pete Seeger the following year. "Little Boxes" was inspired visually by the houses of Daly City, California. Nancy Reynolds Schimmel, Reynolds' daughter, explained:

My mother and father were driving South from San Francisco through Daly City when my mom got the idea for the song. She asked my dad to take the wheel, and she wrote it on the way to the gathering in La Honda where she was going to sing for the Friends Committee on Legislation. When Time Magazine (I think, maybe Newsweek) wanted a photo of her pointing to the very place, she couldn't find those houses because so many more had been built around them that the hillsides were totally covered.

In her later years, Reynolds contributed songs and material to PBS' Sesame Street, on which she made occasional appearances as a character named Kate.

== Personal life and death ==
In 1934, she married William ("Bud") Reynolds, a carpenter and labor organizer. In 1935, their only child was born, Nancy Reynolds Schimmel, a songwriter and performer. Reynolds lived on Parker Street in Berkeley.

Reynolds was a Unitarian Universalist.

In 1977, Reynolds became an associate of the Women's Institute for Freedom of the Press (WIFP), an American non-profit publishing organization. The organization works to increase communication between women and connect the public with forms of women-based medicine.

Shortly before her husband's death in September 1972, she was diagnosed with acute pancreatitis. However, she refused to let the disease keep her from her usual performance schedule, until she fell ill in the afternoon of March 15, 1978, after a photo shoot in Berkeley. Rushed to hospital, she died during the early morning hours of March 17, 1978.

== Legacy ==
Reynolds' career was the subject of a biographical short film, Love It Like a Fool, released during her lifetime in 1977 and directed by Susan Wengraf.

== In popular culture ==
In 1979, the Supersisters trading card set was produced and distributed. One of the cards featured Reynolds's name and picture.

Reynolds' song "Little Boxes" was used as the theme for Showtime's TV series Weeds (2005–2012).

The TV show Big Sky featured the song "Little Boxes" at the end of the episode aptly titled "Little Boxes".

In 2020, most of the second verse of her one-minute ditty "Place to Be," as recorded by her, was used as the sound for a Zillow commercial.

Two of her songs are included on the Specials' album Protest Songs 1924–2012 (2021).

"Turn Around" was featured in several television commercials in the 1960's for Kodak.

== Work ==
Four collections of Reynolds' music are available on compact disc. The Smithsonian Folkways label released Another County Heard From (Folkways 02524) and Ear to the Ground (Smithsonian Folkways 40124), and the Omni Recording Corporation in Australia issued Malvina Reynolds (Omni 112) and Malvina Reynolds Sings the Truth (Omni 114). Her work can also be found on Spotify.
