= Billboard Top Country & Western Records of 1957 =

Billboard Top Country & Western Records of 1957 is made up of two year-end charts compiled by Billboard magazine ranking the year's top country and western records based on record sales and jockey plays.

Ferlin Husky had the number one country and western record of the year with "Gone".

The Everly Brothers had two of the top ten records with "Bye Bye Love" (No. 3) and "Wake Up Little Susie" (No. 8).

Elvis Presley and Marty Robbins each had five of the Top 50 records, including No. 1 hits: "Jailhouse Rock", "Teddy Bear", "All Shook Up", "A White Sport Coat", and "Singing the Blues".

Decca Records led the other labels with 15 of the top 50 records, followed by RCA Victor with 13, Columbia Records with 11, Capitol Records with seven, and Sun Records with six.

Best selling	Jockeys	Peak (Note: This column recites the record's peak position on Billboard's weekly charts.)	Title	Artist(s)	Label
1	2	1	"Gone"	Ferlin Husky	Capitol
2	6	1	"Fraulein"	Bobby Helms	Decca
3	5	1	"Bye Bye Love"	The Everly Brothers	Cadence
4	8	1	"A White Sport Coat"	Marty Robbins	Columbia
5	1	1	"Young Love"	Sonny James	Capitol
6	3	1	"Four Walls"	Jim Reeves	RCA Victor
7	7/27	1/7	"There You Go"/"Train of Love"	Johnny Cash	Sun
8	12	1	"Wake Up Little Susie"	Everly Brothers	Cadence
9	9	3	"Gonna Find Me a Bluebird"	Marvin Rainwater	M-G-M
10	30	1	"Jailhouse Rock"	Elvis Presley	RCA Victor
11	4	1	"Singing the Blues"	Marty Robbins	Columbia
12	33	1	"Whole Lotta Shakin' Goin' On"	Jerry Lee Lewis	Sun
13	31	1	"(Let Me Be Your) Teddy Bear"/"Loving You"	Elvis Presley	RCA Victor
14	13	1	"Honky Tonk Song"	Webb Pierce	Decca
15	23	1	"My Special Angel"	Bobby Helms	Decca
16	19	1	"All Shook Up"	Elvis Presley	RCA Victor
17	11	1	"My Shoes Keep Walking Back to You"	Ray Price	Columbia
18	21	2	"Walkin' After Midnight"	Patsy Cline	Decca
19	28	4	"Geisha Girl"	Hank Locklin	RCA Victor
20	10	3	"I'm Tired"	Webb Pierce	Decca
21	16/37	2/4	"I've Got a New Heartache"/"Wasted Words"	Ray Price	Columbia
22	NR	2	"A Fallen Star"	Jimmy Newman	Dot
23	35	1	"I Walk the Line"	Johnny Cash	Sun
24	25	1	"Crazy Arms"	Ray Price	Columbia
25	32	3	"Too Much"	Elvis Presley	RCA Victor
26	17	3	"Knee Deep in the Blues"	Marty Robbins	Columbia
27	24	3	"Home of the Blues"	Johnny Cash	Sun
28	NR	4	"Tangled Mind"	Hank Snow	RCA Victor
29	41	8	"A Fallen Star"	Ferlin Husky	Capitol
30	14	3	"Am I Losing You"	Jim Reeves	RCA Victor
31	34	7	"Bye Bye Love"	Webb Pierce	Decca
32	38	9	"Next in Line"	Johnny Cash	Sun
33	22	3	"Holiday for Love"	Webb Pierce	Decca
34	NR	9	"Is It Wrong (For Loving You)"	Warner Mack	Decca
35	18	2	"Why, Why?"	Carl Smith	Columbia
36	NR	7	"Honeycomb"	Jimmie Rodgers	Roulette
37	26	5	"I Miss You Already"	Faron Young	Capitol
38	NR	3	"Love Me Tender"	Elvis Presley	RCA Victor
39	43	9	"First Date, First Kiss, First Love"	Sonny James	Capitol
40	NR	10	"(I'll Always Be Your) Fraulein"	Kitty Wells	Decca
41	NR	1	"The Story of My Life"	Marty Robbins	Columbia
42	NR	13	"Your True Love"	Carl Perkins	Sun
43	NR	3	"Searching (For Someone Like You)"	Kitty Wells	Decca
44	35	7	"Stolen Moments"	Hank Snow	RCA Victor
45	20	4	"I Heard the Bluebirds Sing"	The Browns	RCA Victor
46	47	7	"Three Ways (To Love You)"	Kitty Wells	Decca
47	50	6	"Repenting"	Kitty Wells	Decca
48	NR	11	"Please Don't Blame Me"	Marty Robbins	Columbia
49	NR	5	"I Found My Girl in the U.S.A."	Jimmie Skinner	Mercury
50	NR	6	"Raunchy"	Bill Justis	Phillips International
NR	29	6	"You're the Reason (I'm in Love)"	Sonny James	Capitol
NR	39	11	"I'm Coming Home"	Johnny Horton	Columbia
NR	40	8	"Oh, So Many Years"	Kitty Wells, Webb Pierce	Decca
NR	42	6	"Go Away with Me"	Wilburn Brothers	Decca
NR	44	7	"Missing You"	Webb Pierce	Decca
NR	45	9	"Two Shadows on Your Window"	Jim Reeves	RCA Victor
NR	46	4	"According to My Heart"	Jim Reeves	RCA Victor
NR	48	11	"Don't Laugh"	Louvin Brothers	Capitol
NR	49	12	"On My Mind Again"	Billy Walker	Columbia

== See also ==
- List of Billboard number-one country songs of 1957
- Billboard year-end top 50 singles of 1957
- 1957 in country music
