= List of Billboard number-one country songs of 1957 =

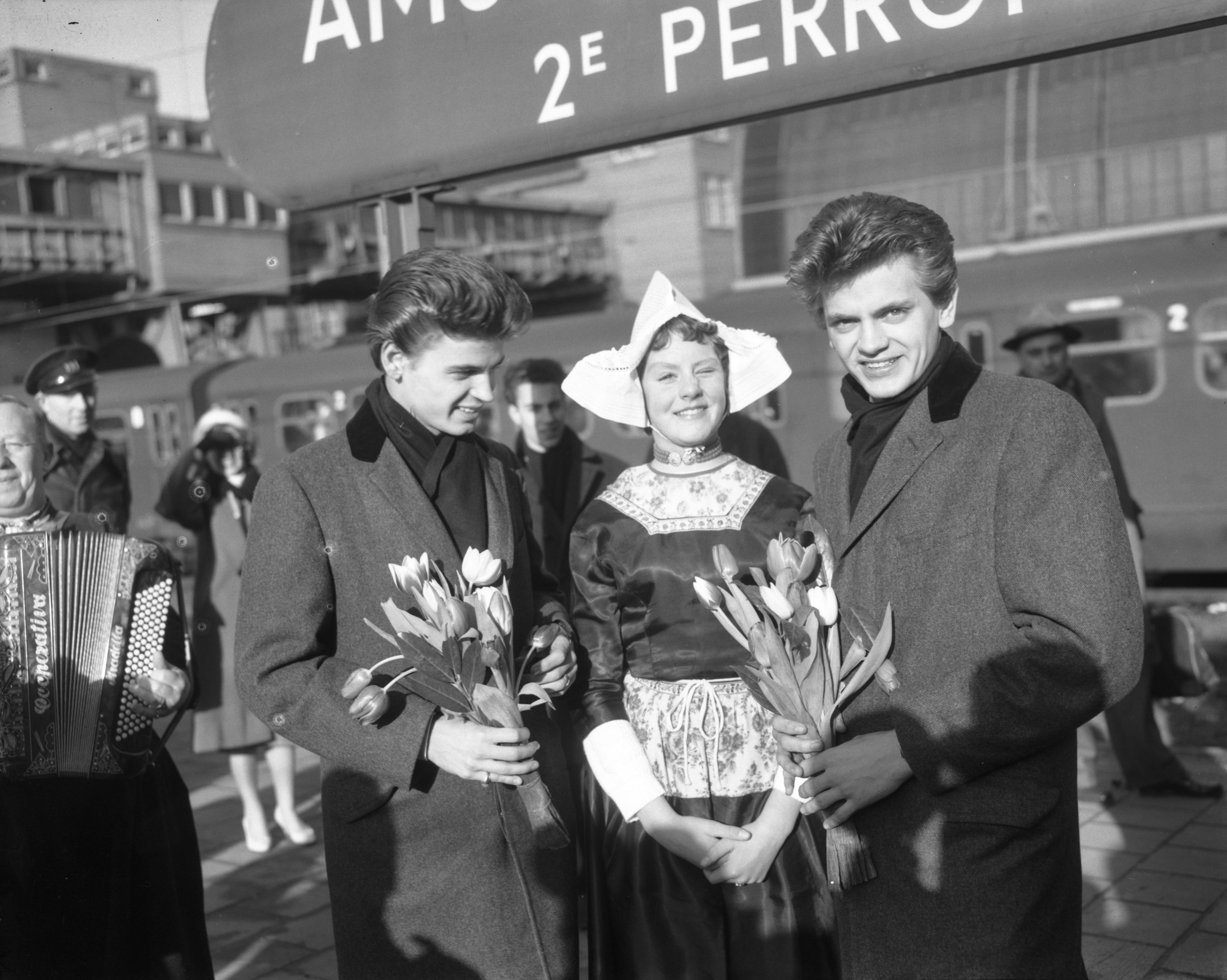
The Everly Brothers took the songs "Bye Bye Love" and "Wake Up Little Susie" to number one on both the best sellers and jockeys charts.

In 1957, Billboard magazine published three charts covering the best-performing country music songs in the United States: Most Played C&W in Juke Boxes, which had appeared in Billboard since 1944, C&W Best Sellers in Stores, which had debuted in 1948, and Most Played C&W by Jockeys, which had launched in 1949. The "C&W" used in the titles of the charts was an abbreviation for "country and western", a term which Billboard had adopted for the genre in 1949, replacing the earlier "folk music". The Juke Box chart was published for the final time in the issue of Billboard dated June 17, 1957. The other two listings merged in 1958 to form a combined chart, which since 2005 has been published as Hot Country Songs.

At the start of 1957, the number-one position on all three charts was held by "Singing the Blues" by Marty Robbins, who achieved a second number one in June with "A White Sport Coat (And A Pink Carnation)". The latter song also topped all three charts and was at number one on the final C&W juke box chart published by Billboard. Robbins was the only artist with more than one chart-topper on the juke box listing, and his total of eleven weeks in the top spot was the most by any artist on the chart. Three other acts had more than one country number one in 1957. Bobby Helms took both "Fraulein" and "My Special Angel" to the top of both the best sellers and jockeys charts; the singles were his first two chart entries but would prove to be the only country number ones of his career. The Everly Brothers also topped both charts with "Bye Bye Love" and "Wake Up Little Susie". Elvis Presley was the only act with three country number ones during the year; he reached the peak position on the juke box chart in May with "All Shook Up" and later in the year topped the best sellers chart with the double-sided entries "Teddy Bear" / "Loving You" and "Jailhouse Rock" / "Treat Me Nice". Despite their success on the other charts, none of Presley's songs topped the jockeys chart, which was based on radio airplay. Three songs topped only the jockeys chart, including "Four Walls" by Jim Reeves, which spent eight non-consecutive weeks atop the listing beginning in May, but failed to top either of the other two charts.

Sonny James achieved his first country number one in 1957 with "Young Love", which also topped Billboard's pop airplay chart. The singer, dubbed the "Southern Gentleman", would go on to become one of the most successful artists in country music history, with more than 20 number ones. Rock and roll pioneer Jerry Lee Lewis, whose early recordings were successful on the country charts, reached number one for the first time in September with "Whole Lotta Shakin' Goin' On", which was also a rhythm and blues number one. The song has been included on lists of the greatest tracks of all time, and in 2015 was selected for permanent preservation in the National Recording Registry at the Library of Congress. The Everly Brothers also topped the country charts for the first time, with "Bye Bye Love", and returned to number one later in the year with "Wake Up Little Susie", which also topped Billboard's pop and R&B charts. The brothers had the highest total number of weeks atop both the country best sellers and jockeys charts, with 14 and 15 weeks respectively at number one. "Gone" by Ferlin Husky had the longest unbroken run at number one on any of the charts, topping the best sellers chart for ten consecutive weeks.

== Chart history ==
In 1957, Billboard sometimes listed both sides of a single jointly at number one on the Best Sellers and Juke Box charts, based on a methodology which combined the survey data for both songs if "significant action [was] reported on both sides of a record". This does not indicate that the single was officially released or promoted as a double A-side.

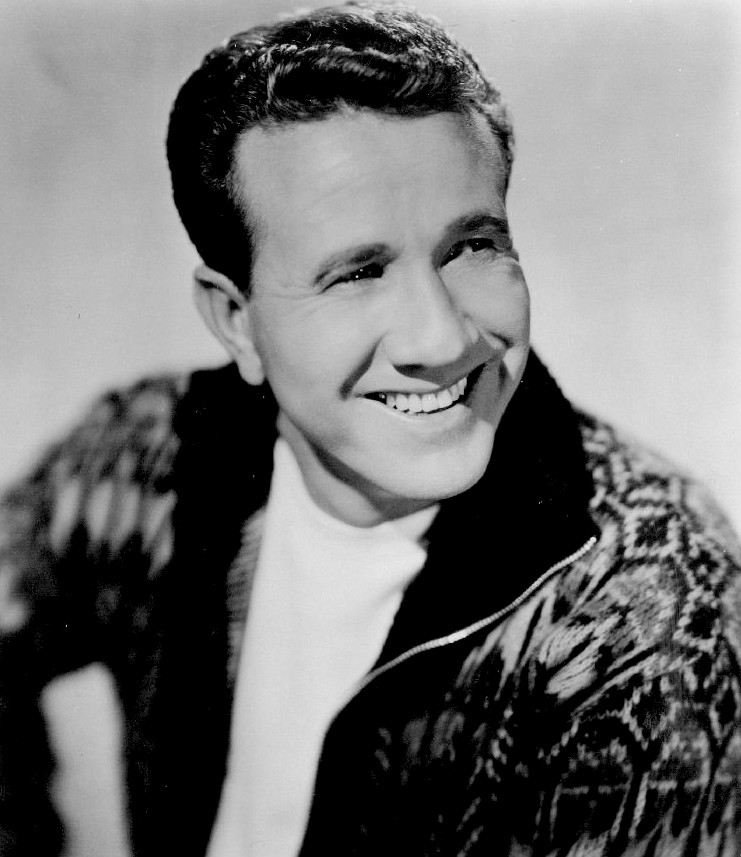
Marty Robbins had the final number one on the juke box chart with "A White Sport Coat (And A Pink Carnation)".

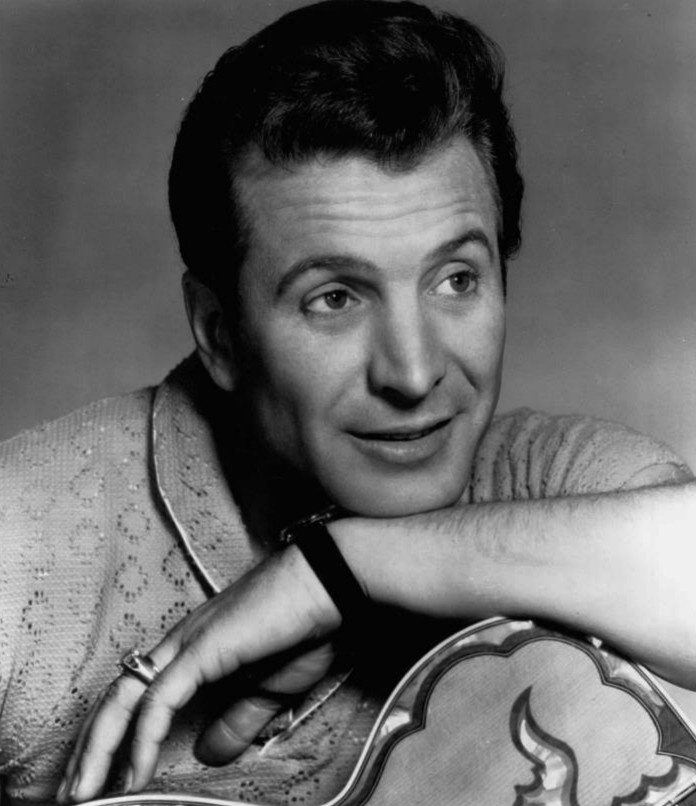
Ferlin Husky had the longest-running number one of 1957 on the best sellers chart.

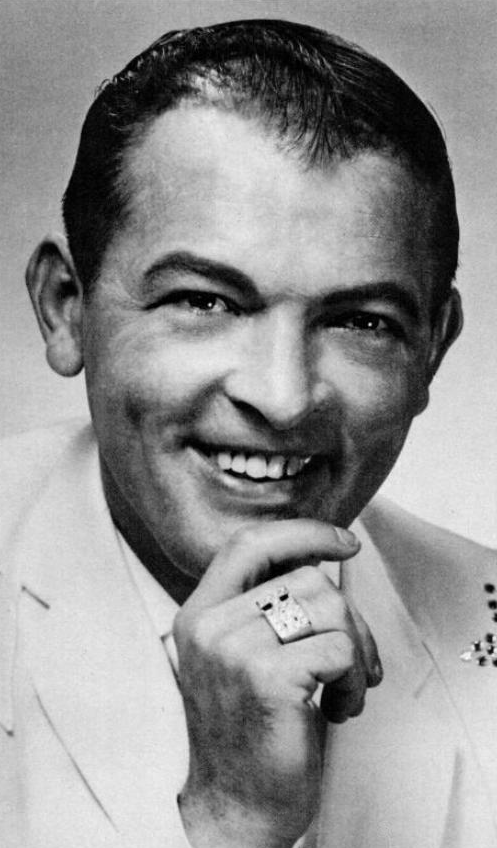
Bobby Helms had two chart-toppers in 1957 and ended the year at number one on both the best sellers and jockeys charts.

Chart history
Issue date	Juke Box		Best Sellers		Jockeys		Ref.
Issue date	Title	Artist(s)	Title	Artist(s)	Title	Artist(s)	Ref.
January 5	"Singing the Blues"	Marty Robbins	"Singing the Blues"	Marty Robbins	"Singing the Blues"	Marty Robbins	
January 12	"Singing the Blues"	Marty Robbins	"Singing the Blues"	Marty Robbins	"Singing the Blues"	Marty Robbins	
January 19	"Singing the Blues"	Marty Robbins	"Singing the Blues"	Marty Robbins	"Singing the Blues"	Marty Robbins	
January 26	"Singing the Blues"	Marty Robbins	"Singing the Blues"	Marty Robbins	"Singing the Blues"	Marty Robbins	
February 2	"Singing the Blues"	Marty Robbins	"Singing the Blues"	Marty Robbins	"Young Love"	Sonny James	
February 9	"Singing the Blues"	Marty Robbins	"Singing the Blues"	Marty Robbins	"Young Love"	Sonny James	
February 16	"Young Love"	Sonny James	"Young Love"^{[a]}	Sonny James	"Singing the Blues"	Marty Robbins	
February 23	"Young Love"	Sonny James	"Young Love"^{[a]}	Sonny James	"Young Love"	Sonny James	
March 2	"There You Go" / "Train of Love"^{[c]}	Johnny Cash	"Young Love"^{[a]}	Sonny James	"Young Love"	Sonny James	
March 9	"There You Go" / "Train of Love"^{[c]}	Johnny Cash	"Young Love"^{[a]}	Sonny James	"Young Love"	Sonny James	
March 16	"Young Love"	Sonny James	"Young Love"^{[a]}	Sonny James	"Young Love"	Sonny James	
March 23	"Young Love"	Sonny James	"Young Love"^{[a]}	Sonny James	"Young Love"	Sonny James	
March 30	"There You Go" / "Train of Love"^{[b]}	Johnny Cash	"Young Love"^{[a]}	Sonny James	"Young Love"	Sonny James	
April 6	"There You Go" / "Train of Love"^{[b]}	Johnny Cash	"Gone"	Ferlin Husky	"Gone"	Ferlin Husky	
April 13	"There You Go" / "Train of Love"^{[b]}	Johnny Cash	"Gone"	Ferlin Husky	"Gone"	Ferlin Husky	
April 20	"Gone"	Ferlin Husky	"Gone"	Ferlin Husky	"Gone"	Ferlin Husky	
April 27	"Gone"	Ferlin Husky	"Gone"	Ferlin Husky	"Gone"	Ferlin Husky	
April 29^{[d]}	"Gone"	Ferlin Husky	"Gone"	Ferlin Husky	"Gone"	Ferlin Husky	
May 6	"Gone"	Ferlin Husky	"Gone"	Ferlin Husky	"Gone"	Ferlin Husky	
May 13	"All Shook Up"	Elvis Presley	"Gone"	Ferlin Husky	"Gone"	Ferlin Husky	
May 20^{[e]}	"Gone"	Ferlin Husky	"Gone"	Ferlin Husky	"Gone"	Ferlin Husky	
May 20^{[e]}	"A White Sport Coat (And A Pink Carnation)"	Marty Robbins	"Gone"	Ferlin Husky	"Honky Tonk Song"	Webb Pierce	
May 27^{[f]}	"A White Sport Coat (And A Pink Carnation)"	Marty Robbins	"Gone"	Ferlin Husky	"Gone"	Ferlin Husky	
May 27^{[f]}	"A White Sport Coat (And A Pink Carnation)"	Marty Robbins	"Gone"	Ferlin Husky	"Four Walls"	Jim Reeves	
June 3	"A White Sport Coat (And A Pink Carnation)"	Marty Robbins	"Gone"	Ferlin Husky	"A White Sport Coat (And A Pink Carnation)"	Marty Robbins	
June 10	"A White Sport Coat (And A Pink Carnation)"	Marty Robbins	"A White Sport Coat (And A Pink Carnation)"	Marty Robbins	"Four Walls"	Jim Reeves	
June 17	"A White Sport Coat (And A Pink Carnation)"	Marty Robbins	"A White Sport Coat (And A Pink Carnation)"	Marty Robbins	"Four Walls"	Jim Reeves	
June 24	—		"A White Sport Coat (And A Pink Carnation)"	Marty Robbins	"Four Walls"	Jim Reeves	
July 1	—		"A White Sport Coat (And A Pink Carnation)"	Marty Robbins	"Four Walls"	Jim Reeves	
July 8	—		"A White Sport Coat (And A Pink Carnation)"	Marty Robbins	"Four Walls"	Jim Reeves	
July 15	—		"Bye Bye Love"	The Everly Brothers	"Four Walls"	Jim Reeves	
July 22	—		"Bye Bye Love"	The Everly Brothers	"Four Walls"	Jim Reeves	
July 29	—		"Bye Bye Love"	The Everly Brothers	"Bye Bye Love"	The Everly Brothers	
August 5	—		"Teddy Bear" / "Loving You"^{[c]}	Elvis Presley	"Bye Bye Love"	The Everly Brothers	
August 12	—		"Bye Bye Love"	The Everly Brothers	"Bye Bye Love"	The Everly Brothers	
August 19	—		"Bye Bye Love"	The Everly Brothers	"Bye Bye Love"	The Everly Brothers	
August 26	—		"Bye Bye Love"	The Everly Brothers	"Bye Bye Love"	The Everly Brothers	
September 2	—		"Bye Bye Love"	The Everly Brothers	"Bye Bye Love"	The Everly Brothers	
September 9	—		"Whole Lotta Shakin' Goin' On"	Jerry Lee Lewis	"Bye Bye Love"	The Everly Brothers	
September 16	—		"Whole Lotta Shakin' Goin' On"	Jerry Lee Lewis	"Fraulein"	Bobby Helms	
September 23	—		"Fraulein"	Bobby Helms	"Fraulein"	Bobby Helms	
September 30	—		"Fraulein"	Bobby Helms	"My Shoes Keep Walking Back to You"	Ray Price	
October 7	—		"Fraulein"	Bobby Helms	"Fraulein"	Bobby Helms	
October 14	—		"Wake Up Little Susie"	The Everly Brothers	"Fraulein"	Bobby Helms	
October 21	—		"Wake Up Little Susie"	The Everly Brothers	"My Shoes Keep Walking Back to You"	Ray Price	
October 28	—		"Wake Up Little Susie"	The Everly Brothers	"Wake Up Little Susie"	The Everly Brothers	
November 4	—		"Wake Up Little Susie"	The Everly Brothers	"Wake Up Little Susie"	The Everly Brothers	
November 11	—		"Wake Up Little Susie"	The Everly Brothers	"Wake Up Little Susie"	The Everly Brothers	
November 18	—		"Wake Up Little Susie"	The Everly Brothers	"Wake Up Little Susie"	The Everly Brothers	
November 25	—		"Wake Up Little Susie"	The Everly Brothers	"Wake Up Little Susie"	The Everly Brothers	
December 2	—		"Jailhouse Rock" / "Treat Me Nice"^{[c]}	Elvis Presley	"Wake Up Little Susie"	The Everly Brothers	
December 9	—		"My Special Angel"	Bobby Helms	"Wake Up Little Susie"	The Everly Brothers	
December 16	—		"My Special Angel"	Bobby Helms	"My Shoes Keep Walking Back to You"	Ray Price	
December 23	—		"My Special Angel"	Bobby Helms	"Wake Up Little Susie"	The Everly Brothers	
December 30	—		"My Special Angel"	Bobby Helms	"My Special Angel"	Bobby Helms	

Notes

a. B-side "You're the Reason (I'm in Love)" listed jointly at number one from the March 16 issue onwards
b. "Train of Love" not listed jointly at number one in the March 30 issue
c. Both sides listed jointly at number one
d. Due to a change in Billboard's cover-dating policy, the issue after that dated April 27 was dated April 29.
e. Two singles tied for number one on both the Juke Box and Jockeys charts.
f. Two singles tied for number one on the Jockeys chart.

== See also ==
- 1957 in country music
- List of artists who reached number one on the U.S. country chart
