= 1957 in country music =

This is a list of notable events in country music that took place in the year 1957.

== Events ==
- April — Jimmy Dean hosts his first nationally televised series, a 30-minute daytime variety series airing on CBS named The Jimmy Dean Show. The show has a prime-time run from June to September (as a summer replacement series); the daytime show will run until 1958. This is the first of three country music-oriented series bearing Dean's name and hosting duties.
- June 24 — Billboard terminates its "Most Played C&W in Juke Boxes" chart, leaving just the "Most Played C&W by Jockeys" and "C&W Best Sellers in Stores" charts to gauge a song's popularity.
- November 4 — The Nos. 1 and 2 songs on the Billboard Hot 100, and Billboard's R&B and country charts are identical: Elvis Presley's "Jailhouse Rock" and the Everly Brothers' "Wake Up Little Susie." In addition, the No. 6 hit on the Hot 100 and R&B charts — Jimmie Rodgers' "Honeycomb" — is also climbing the country chart.
- December 11 — Jerry Lee Lewis secretly weds his second cousin, Myra Gale Brown, in Hernando, Tennessee.

== Top hits of the year ==
=== Number one hits ===
==== United States ====
(as certified by Billboard)

Date	Single Name	Artist	Wks. No.1	Notes
February 2	Young Love	Sonny James	9	^{[A]}: Also reached Number One on the Billboard Pop Chart.
March 2	There You Go	Johnny Cash	5	^{[2]}
April 6	Gone	Ferlin Husky	10	^{[1]}: Husky's first Number One since "A Dear John Letter in 1953.
May 13	All Shook Up	Elvis Presley	1	Also reached Number One on the Billboard Pop and R&B charts.
May 20	A White Sport Coat	Marty Robbins	5
May 20	Honky Tonk Song	Webb Pierce	1	^{[B]}
May 27	Four Walls	Jim Reeves	8	^{[2]}: Reeves' first Number One since "Bimbo" in 1954.
July 15	Bye Bye Love	The Everly Brothers	7	^{[A]}
August 5	(Let Me Be Your) Teddy Bear	Elvis Presley	1	Also reached Number One on the Billboard Pop and R&B charts.
September 9	Whole Lotta Shakin' Goin On	Jerry Lee Lewis	2	^{[A]}: Also reached Number One on the Billboard R&B chart.
September 16	Fraulein	Bobby Helms	4	^{[2], [A]}
September 16	My Shoes Keep Walking Back to You	Ray Price	4	^{[2]}
October 14	Wake Up Little Susie	The Everly Brothers	8	^{[2]}: Also reached Number One on the Billboard Pop and R&B charts.
December 2	Jailhouse Rock	Elvis Presley	1	Also reached Number One on the Billboard Pop and R&B charts.
December 9	My Special Angel	Bobby Helms	4	^{[B]}

Notes

- 1 No. 1 song of the year, as determined by Billboard.
- 2 Song dropped from No. 1 and later returned to top spot.
- A First Billboard No. 1 hit for that artist.
- B Last Billboard No. 1 hit for that artist.

Note: Several songs were simultaneous No. 1 hits on the separate "Most Played C&W in Juke Boxes," "Most Played C&W by Jockeys" and "C&W Best Sellers in Stores" charts.

=== Other major hits ===
US	Single	Artist
3	Am I Losing You	Jim Reeves
9	The Auctioneer	Leroy Van Dyke
7	Bye Bye Love	Webb Pierce
14	Dark Moon	Bonnie Guitar
12	Don't Do It Darlin'	Webb Pierce
11	Don't Laugh	The Louvin Brothers
10	Don't Stop the Music	George Jones
2	A Fallen Star	Jimmy C. Newman
8	A Fallen Star	Ferlin Husky
9	First Date, First Kiss, First Love	Sonny James
7	For Rent (One Empty Heart)	Sonny James
4	Geisha Girl	Hank Locklin
13	Give My Love to Rose	Johnny Cash
3	Gonna Find Me a Bluebird	Marvin Rainwater
12	Gonna Find Me a Bluebird	Eddy Arnold
3	Holiday for Love	Webb Pierce
3	Home of the Blues	Johnny Cash
7	Honeycomb	Jimmie Rodgers
7	I Can't Quit (I've Gone Too Far)	Marty Robbins
4	I Heard the Bluebirds Sing	The Browns
5	I Miss You Already (And You're Not Even Gone)	Faron Young
11	I Thought I Heard You Call My Name	Porter Wagoner
10	(I'll Always Be Your) Fraulein	Kitty Wells
12	I'll Be There (When You Get Lonely)	Ray Price
11	I'm Coming Home	Johnny Horton
3	I'm Tired	Webb Pierce
13	Jingle Bell Rock	Bobby Helms
6	Kisses Sweeter than Wine	Jimmie Rodgers
3	Knee Deep in the Blues	Marty Robbins
12	Love Has Finally Come My Way	Faron Young
14	Love Me to Pieces	Rusty & Doug
15	Lovesick Blues	Sonny James
15	Loving You	Elvis Presley
11	Mean Woman Blues	Elvis Presley
7	Missing You	Webb Pierce
15	Mister Fire Eyes	Bonnie Guitar
15	Money	The Browns
8	Mister Love	Ernest Tubb and The Wilburn Brothers
8	My Arms Are a House	Hank Snow
9	Next in Line	Johnny Cash
8	Oh, So Many Years	Kitty Wells and Webb Pierce
12	On My Mind Again	Billy Walker
15	One Step at a Time	Brenda Lee
8	Playing for Keeps	Elvis Presley
11	Please Don't Blame Me	Marty Robbins
14	Plenty of Everything but You	The Louvin Brothers
14	A Poor Man's Roses (Or a Rich Man's Gold)	Patsy Cline
12	Prize Possession	Ferlin Husky
6	Repenting	Kitty Wells
13	Rockin' in the Congo	Hank Thompson
14	The Same Two Lips	Marty Robbins
15	The Shrine of St. Cecilia	Faron Young
12	Someday	Webb Pierce
7	Stolen Moments	Hank Snow
8	Talkin' to the Blues	Jim Lowe
4	Tangled Mind	Hank Snow
14	Tears Are Only Rain	Hank Thompson
15	Teen-Age Dream	Marty Robbins
15	There Goes My Love	George Morgan
7	Three Ways (To Love You)	Kitty Wells
3	Too Much	Elvis Presley
13	Too Much Water	George Jones
7	Train of Love	Johnny Cash
11	Treat Me Nice	Elvis Presley
9	Two Shadows On Your Window	Jim Reeves
2	Walkin' After Midnight	Patsy Cline
2	Why, Why	Carl Smith
9	The Woman I Need	Johnny Horton
10	Yearning	George Jones and Jeanette Hicks
15	You Can't Hurt Me Anymore	Carl Smith
7	You Done Me Wrong	Ray Price
6	You're the Reason I'm in Love	Sonny James
12	Young Hearts	Jim Reeves
13	Your True Love	Carl Perkins

== Top new album releases ==
- Johnny Cash With His Hot and Blue Guitar – Johnny Cash (Sun) debut album

== Births ==
- January 4 — Patty Loveless, top female vocalist of the late 1980s and 1990s, thanks to her voice combining bluegrass, blues and rock.
- February 19 — Lorianne Crook, radio and television personality, one half of Crook & Chase.
- April 12 — Vince Gill, top male vocalist and prominent member of the new traditionalist movement of the late 1980s/1990s.
- May 2 — Mark Sissel, lead guitarist from the Western Underground.
- July 24 — Pam Tillis, daughter of Mel Tillis and popular female vocalist of the 1990s.
- July 27 – Bill Engvall, comedian and member of Blue Collar Comedy with Jeff Foxworthy, Larry the Cable Guy and Ron White
- August 22 — Holly Dunn, female star and artist who helped popularize country music during the late 1980s/early 1990s (died 2016).
- November 1 — Lyle Lovett, alternative country star.

== Deaths ==
- March 24 — Carson Robison, 66, early C&W singer-songwriter.

== Other links ==
- Country Music Association
