= Billboard Top R&B Records of 1957 =

Music record chart

Billboard Top R&B Records of 1957 is made up of two year-end charts compiled by Billboard magazine ranking the year's top rhythm and blues records based on record sales and disc jockey plays. Due to the extent of cross-over between the R&B and pop charts in 1957, the song's rank, if any, in the year-end pop chart is also provided.

Retail	Disk jockey	Pop rank	Title	Artist(s)	Label
1	10/NR	16/NR	"Jailhouse Rock"/"Treat Me Nice"	Elvis Presley	RCA Victor
2	3/24	21	"Searchin'"/"Young Blood"	The Coasters	Atco
3	12	20	"You Send Me"	Sam Cooke	Keen
4	21	19	"Wake Up Little Susie"	The Everly Brothers	Cadence
5	7	1	"All Shook Up"	Elvis Presley	RCA Victor
6	1	50	"Blue Monday"	Fats Domino	RCA Victor
7	20	27	"Honeycomb"	Jimmie Rodgers	Roulette
8	23	24	"Diana"	Paul Anka	ABC-Paramount
9	36	35	"Silhouettes"	The Rays	Augusta
10	29	18	"Come Go with Me"	The Del-Vikings	Dot
11	4	38	"I'm Walkin'"	Fats Domino	Imperial
12	2	NR	"Love Is Strange"	Mickey & Sylvia	Vik
13	14	40	"Send for Me"	Nat King Cole	Capitol
14	16	43	"Short Fat Fannie"	Larry Williams	Specialty
15	8	22	"School Days"	Chuck Berry	Chess
16	NR	3	"Little Darlin'"	The Diamonds	Mercury
17	28	30	"That'll Be the Day"	The Crickets	Brunswick
18	41	NR	"Lucille"	Little Richard	Specialty
19	15	28	"Whole Lotta Shakin' Goin' On"	Jerry Lee Lewis	Sun
19	13	48	"Blueberry Hill"	Fats Domino	Imperial
21	35	NR	"Happy, Happy Birthday Baby"	The Tune Weavers	Checker
22	9	NR	"C.C. Rider"	Chuck Willis	Atlantic
23	11	47	"Mr. Lee"	The Bobbettes	Atlantic
24	22	14	"(Let Me Be Your) Teddy Bear"/"Loving You"	Elvis Presley	RCA Victor
25	5	NR	"Since I Met You Baby"	Ivory Joe Hunter	Atlantic
26	49	5	"So Rare"	Jimmy Dorsey	Fraternity
27	6	NR	"Jim Dandy"	LaVern Baker	Atlantic
28	42	NR	"Honky Tonk"	Bill Doggett	King
29	30	NR	"Little Bitty Pretty One"	Thurston Harris	Aladdin
30	NR	42	"Be-Bop Baby"	Ricky Nelson	Imperial
31	26	NR	"Valley of Tears"	Fats Domino	Imperial
32	50	NR	"Just Because"	Lloyd Price	ABC-Paramount
33	37	NR	"Over the Mountain"	Johnnie & Joe	Chess
34	48	NR	"Jenny, Jenny"/"Miss Ann"	Little Richard	Specialty
35	17	NR	"Farther Up the Road"	Bobby Bland	Duke
36	17	NR	"Without Love"	Clyde McPhatter	Atlantic
37	27	NR	"Keep A-Knockin'"	Little Richard	Specialty
38	19	13	"Party Doll"	Buddy Knox	Roulette
39	45	NR	"It Hurts to Be in Love"	Annie Laurie	Deluxe
40	47	11	"Bye Bye Love"	The Everly Brothers	Cadence
41	NR	NR	"Stardust"	Billy Ward	Liberty
42	NR	2	"Love Letters in the Sand"	Pat Boone	Dot
43	NR	7	"Singing the Blues"	Guy Mitchell	Columbia
44	33	NR	"A Thousand Miles Away"	The Heartbeats	Rama
45	NR	NR	"Next Time You See Me"	Little Junior Parker	Duke
46	39	NR	"Honest I Do"	Jimmy Reed	Vee Jay
47	25	9	"Too Much"	Elvis Presley	RCA Victor
48	NR	NR	"Raunchy"	Bill Justis	Phillips International
49	44	4	"Young Love"	Tab Hunter	Dot
50	34	NR	"Ain't Got No Home"	Clarence "Frogman" Henry	Argo
NR	31	NR	"Send Me Some Lovin'"	Little Richard	Specialty
NR	32	NR	"Long Lonely Nights	Clyde McPhatter	Atlantic
NR	40	48	"Whispering Bells"	The Del Vikings	Dot
NR	42	NR	"You Got Me Dizzy"	Jimmy Reed	Vee Jay
NR	46	NR	"Empty Arms"	Ivory Joe Hunter	Atlantic

== See also ==
- List of Billboard number-one R&B songs of 1957
- Billboard year-end top 50 singles of 1957
- 1957 in music
