= List of Billboard number-one R&B songs of 1957 =

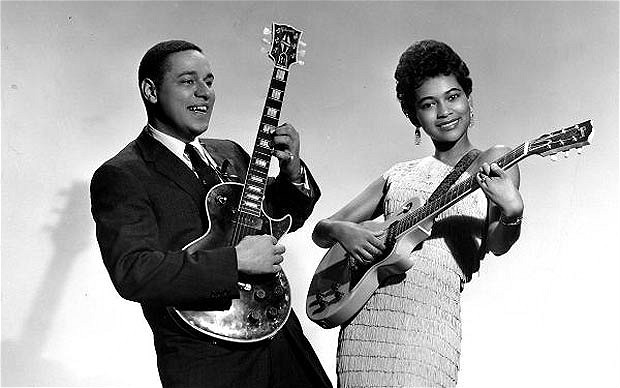
Mickey & Sylvia topped the jockeys chart with "Love Is Strange".

In 1957, Billboard magazine published three charts specifically covering the top-performing songs in the United States in rhythm and blues (R&B) and related African-American-oriented music genres. The R&B Best Sellers in Stores chart ranked records based on their "current national selling importance at the retail level", based on a survey of record retailers "with a high volume of sales in rhythm and blues records". The Most Played R&B by Jockeys chart ranked songs based on the "number of plays on disk jockey radio shows" according to a weekly survey of "top disk jockey shows in all key markets". The Most Played R&B in Juke Boxes chart was based on "plays in juke boxes thruout [sic] the country" derived from a survey of "operators using a high proportion of rhythm and blues records"; this chart was discontinued after the issue of Billboard dated June 17. The three charts are considered part of the lineage of the magazine's multimetric R&B chart launched in 1958, which since 2005 has been published under the title Hot R&B/Hip Hop Songs.

Between January and April, singer and pianist Fats Domino dominated all three charts. He occupied the top spot on the Best Sellers listing for 17 consecutive weeks with "Blueberry Hill", "Blue Monday" and "I'm Walkin'"; all three songs also reached number one on the Jockeys and Juke Box charts. Domino was the most successful black rock & roll artist of the 1950s and achieved a string of pop and R&B successes until the mid-1960s. He was one of several of 1957's chart-topping acts to be included in the inaugural class of inductees to the Rock and Roll Hall of Fame in 1986, along with Elvis Presley, Sam Cooke, Chuck Berry, Little Richard, Jerry Lee Lewis, and the Everly Brothers. Presley was the only artist other than Domino with multiple R&B chart-toppers during the year, with three of his singles topping one or more charts.

The final number one on the juke box chart, in the issue of Billboard dated June 17, was "Searchin'" by the Coasters, which was listed jointly with its flip side, "Young Blood". The single had the year's longest unbroken run atop any of the listings, spending 13 consecutive weeks in the top spot on the Best Sellers chart. The Coasters were also among the early inductees into the Rock and Roll Hall of Fame. Cooke's "You Send Me" was the last number one of 1957 on both the Best Sellers and Jockeys charts; the track reached the top of both listings in the issue dated November 25 and stayed there for the remainder of the year. Several acts achieved the only R&B number one of their career in 1957, including LaVern Baker, Mickey & Sylvia, and Larry Williams. The Bobbettes spent four non-consecutive weeks atop the Jockeys chart with "Mr. Lee", their first chart entry, but would never place another song on any of Billboard's R&B listings, although they did enter the low reaches of the pop charts in 1960 and 1961 before their chart career ended entirely.

== Chart history ==
In 1957, Billboard sometimes listed both sides of a single jointly at number one on the Best Sellers and Juke Box charts, based on a methodology which combined the survey data for both songs if "significant action [was] reported on both sides of a record". This does not indicate that the single was officially released or promoted as a double A-side.

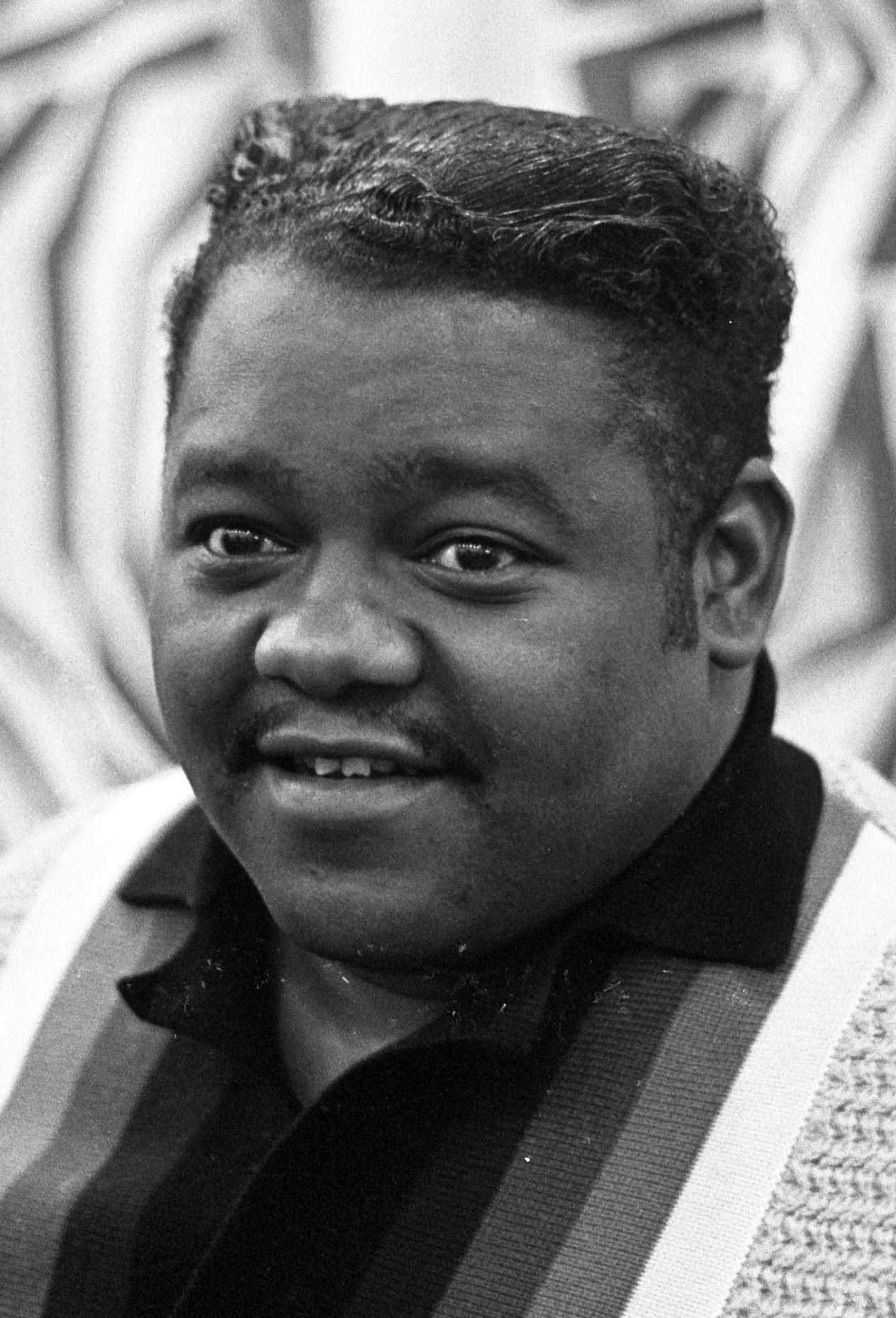
Fats Domino topped all three charts simultaneously with both "Blue Monday" and "I'm Walkin'".

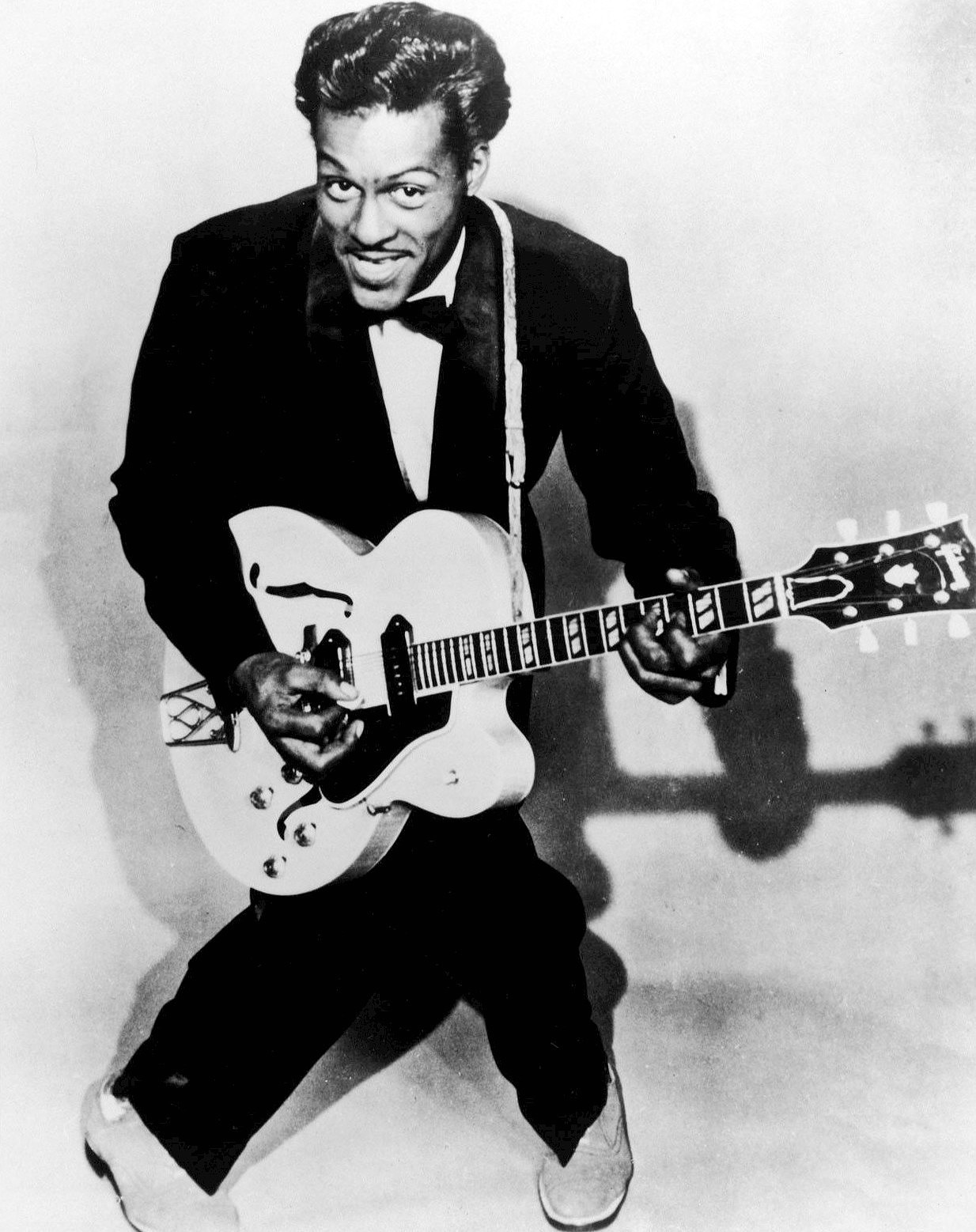
Chuck Berry spent time at number one on all three listings with "School Days".

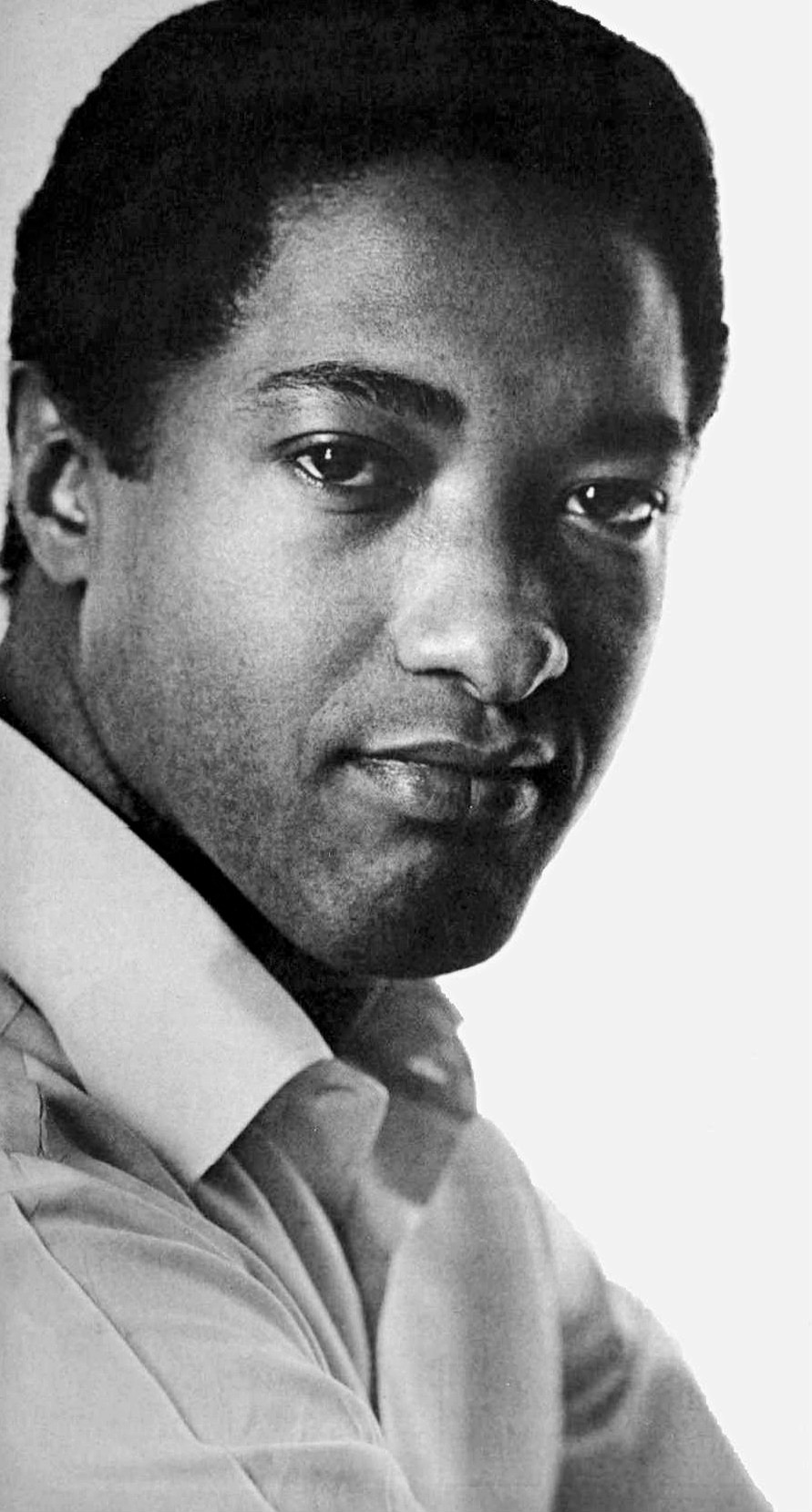
Sam Cooke was at number one on both charts with "You Send Me" in the issue of Billboard dated December 30.

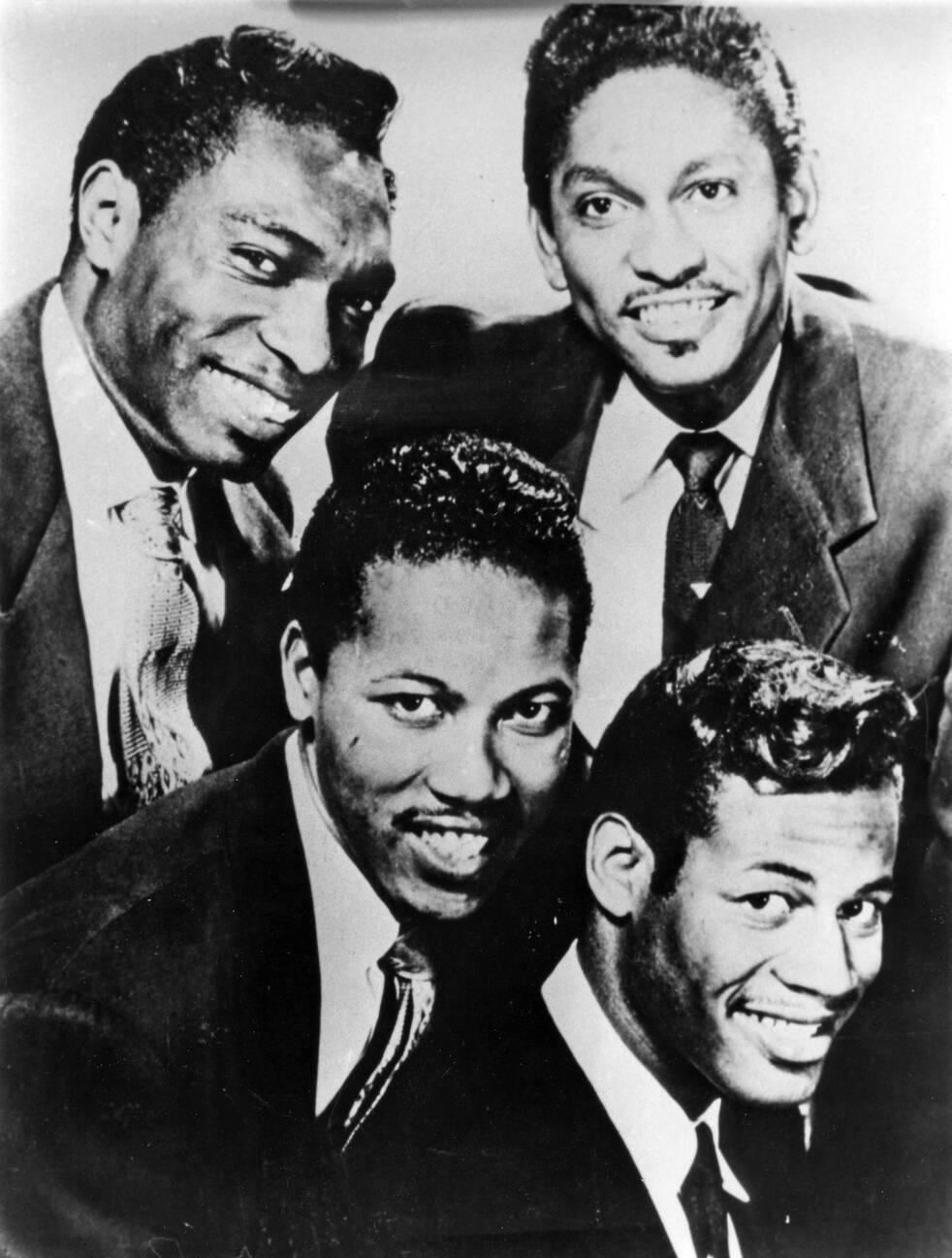
The Coasters had the final number one on the juke box chart.

Chart history
Issue date	Best Sellers		Jockeys		Juke Box		Ref.
Issue date	Title	Artist(s)	Title	Artist(s)	Title	Artist(s)	Ref.
January 5	"Blueberry Hill"	Fats Domino	"Blueberry Hill"	Fats Domino	"Since I Met You Baby"	Ivory Joe Hunter	
January 12	"Blueberry Hill"	Fats Domino	"Since I Met You Baby"	Ivory Joe Hunter	"Since I Met You Baby"	Ivory Joe Hunter	
January 19	"Blueberry Hill"	Fats Domino	"Blueberry Hill"	Fats Domino	"Since I Met You Baby"	Ivory Joe Hunter	
January 26	"Blue Monday"^{[a]}	Fats Domino	"Blue Monday"	Fats Domino	"Blue Monday"^{[b]}	Fats Domino	
February 2	"Blue Monday"^{[a]}	Fats Domino	"Blue Monday"	Fats Domino	"Blue Monday"^{[b]}	Fats Domino	
February 9	"Blue Monday"^{[a]}	Fats Domino	"Blue Monday"	Fats Domino	"Blue Monday"^{[b]}	Fats Domino	
February 16	"Blue Monday"^{[a]}	Fats Domino	"Blue Monday"	Fats Domino	"Blue Monday"^{[b]}	Fats Domino	
February 23	"Blue Monday"^{[a]}	Fats Domino	"Blue Monday"	Fats Domino	"Blue Monday"^{[b]}	Fats Domino	
March 2	"Blue Monday"^{[a]}	Fats Domino	"Blue Monday"	Fats Domino	"Blue Monday"^{[b]}	Fats Domino	
March 9^{[c]}	"Blue Monday"^{[a]}	Fats Domino	"Blue Monday"	Fats Domino	"Blue Monday"^{[b]}	Fats Domino	
March 9^{[c]}	"Blue Monday"^{[a]}	Fats Domino	"Jim Dandy"	LaVern Baker	"Blue Monday"^{[b]}	Fats Domino	
March 16	"Blue Monday"^{[a]}	Fats Domino	"Love Is Strange"	Mickey and Sylvia	"Blue Monday"^{[b]}	Fats Domino	
March 23	"I'm Walkin'"	Fats Domino	"Love Is Strange"	Mickey and Sylvia	"I'm Walkin'"	Fats Domino	
March 30	"I'm Walkin'"	Fats Domino	"I'm Walkin'"	Fats Domino	"I'm Walkin'"	Fats Domino	
April 6	"I'm Walkin'"	Fats Domino	"I'm Walkin'"	Fats Domino	"I'm Walkin'"	Fats Domino	
April 13	"I'm Walkin'"	Fats Domino	"I'm Walkin'"	Fats Domino	"I'm Walkin'"	Fats Domino	
April 20	"I'm Walkin'"	Fats Domino	"I'm Walkin'"	Fats Domino	"I'm Walkin'"	Fats Domino	
April 27	"I'm Walkin'"	Fats Domino	"I'm Walkin'"	Fats Domino	"Lucille" / "Send Me Some Lovin'"^{[d]}	Little Richard	
April 29^{[e]}	"All Shook Up"	Elvis Presley	"School Days"	Chuck Berry	"Lucille" / "Send Me Some Lovin'"^{[d]}	Little Richard	
May 6	"All Shook Up"	Elvis Presley	"All Shook Up"	Elvis Presley	"All Shook Up"	Elvis Presley	
May 13	"All Shook Up"	Elvis Presley	"School Days"	Chuck Berry	"All Shook Up"	Elvis Presley	
May 20	"All Shook Up"	Elvis Presley	"School Days"	Chuck Berry	"School Days"	Chuck Berry	
May 27	"School Days"	Chuck Berry	"All Shook Up"	Elvis Presley	"All Shook Up"	Elvis Presley	
June 3	"Searchin'" / "Young Blood"^{[f]}	The Coasters	"School Days"	Chuck Berry	"All Shook Up"	Elvis Presley	
June 10	"Searchin'" / "Young Blood"^{[f]}	The Coasters	"School Days"	Chuck Berry	"Searchin'" / "Young Blood"^{[d]}	The Coasters	
June 17	"Searchin'" / "Young Blood"^{[f]}	The Coasters	"C.C. Rider"	Chuck Willis	"Searchin'" / "Young Blood"^{[d]}	The Coasters	
June 24	"Searchin'" / "Young Blood"^{[f]}	The Coasters	"Searchin'"	The Coasters	—N/a		
July 1	"Searchin'" / "Young Blood"^{[f]}	The Coasters	"C.C. Rider"	Chuck Willis	—N/a		
July 8	"Searchin'" / "Young Blood"^{[f]}	The Coasters	"Searchin'"	The Coasters	—N/a		
July 15	"Searchin'" / "Young Blood"^{[f]}	The Coasters	"Searchin'"	The Coasters	—N/a		
July 22	"Searchin'" / "Young Blood"^{[f]}	The Coasters	"Searchin'"	The Coasters	—N/a		
July 29^{[c]}	"Searchin'" / "Young Blood"^{[f]}	The Coasters	"Searchin'"	The Coasters	—N/a		
July 29^{[c]}	"Searchin'" / "Young Blood"^{[f]}	The Coasters	"Short Fat Fannie"	Larry Williams	—N/a		
August 5	"Searchin'" / "Young Blood"^{[f]}	The Coasters	"Searchin'"	The Coasters	—N/a		
August 12	"Searchin'" / "Young Blood"^{[f]}	The Coasters	"Searchin'"	The Coasters	—N/a		
August 19	"Searchin'" / "Young Blood"^{[f]}	The Coasters	"Send for Me"	Nat King Cole	—N/a		
August 26	"Searchin'" / "Young Blood"^{[f]}	The Coasters	"Send for Me"	Nat King Cole	—N/a		
September 2	"(Let Me Be Your) Teddy Bear" / "Loving You"^{[d]}	Elvis Presley	"Further Up the Road"	Bobby "Blue" Bland	—N/a		
September 9	"Whole Lot Of Shakin' Going On"	Jerry Lee Lewis	"Whole Lot Of Shakin' Going On"	Jerry Lee Lewis	—N/a		
September 16	"Whole Lot Of Shakin' Going On"	Jerry Lee Lewis	"Long Lonely Nights"	Clyde McPhatter	—N/a		
September 23	"Diana"	Paul Anka	"Further Up the Road"	Bobby "Blue" Bland	—N/a		
September 30	"Diana"	Paul Anka	"Mr. Lee"	The Bobbettes	—N/a		
October 7	"Honeycomb"	Jimmie Rodgers	"Mr. Lee"	The Bobbettes	—N/a		
October 14	"Honeycomb"	Jimmie Rodgers	"Honeycomb"	Jimmie Rodgers	—N/a		
October 21	"Jailhouse Rock"^{[g]}	Elvis Presley	"Mr. Lee"	The Bobbettes	—N/a		
October 28^{[c]}	"Jailhouse Rock"^{[g]}	Elvis Presley	"Mr. Lee"	The Bobbettes	—N/a		
October 28^{[c]}	"Jailhouse Rock"^{[g]}	Elvis Presley	"Wake Up Little Susie"	The Everly Brothers	—N/a		
November 4	"Jailhouse Rock"^{[g]}	Elvis Presley	"Jailhouse Rock"	Elvis Presley	—N/a		
November 11	"Jailhouse Rock"^{[g]}	Elvis Presley	"Jailhouse Rock"	Elvis Presley	—N/a		
November 18	"Jailhouse Rock"^{[g]}	Elvis Presley	"Jailhouse Rock"	Elvis Presley	—N/a		
November 25	"You Send Me"	Sam Cooke	"You Send Me"	Sam Cooke	—N/a		
December 2	"You Send Me"	Sam Cooke	"You Send Me"	Sam Cooke	—N/a		
December 9	"You Send Me"	Sam Cooke	"You Send Me"	Sam Cooke	—N/a		
December 16	"You Send Me"	Sam Cooke	"You Send Me"	Sam Cooke	—N/a		
December 23	"You Send Me"	Sam Cooke	"You Send Me"	Sam Cooke	—N/a		
December 30	"You Send Me"	Sam Cooke	"You Send Me"	Sam Cooke	—N/a		

=== Notes ===
a. B-side "What's the Reason (I'm Not Pleasing You)" listed jointly at number one in the issues dated January 26 and February 2 only
b. B-side "What's the Reason (I'm Not Pleasing You)" listed jointly at number one in the issues dated January 26, February 2, and March 16 only
c. Two songs tied for number one on the jockeys chart.
d. Both sides were listed jointly at number one.
e. Due to a change in Billboard's cover-dating policy, the issue after that dated April 27 was dated April 29.
f. "Young Blood" not listed jointly at number one in the issue dated June 24
g. B-side "Treat Me Nice" listed jointly at number one in the issues dated November 11 and November 18 only
