= List of number-one singles of 1957 (Canada) =

The following is a list of the CHUM Chart number-one singles of 1957.

Issue date	Song	Artist	Reference
May 27	"All Shook Up"	Elvis Presley	
June 3	"Love Letters in the Sand"	Pat Boone	
June 10	"Love Letters in the Sand"	Pat Boone	
June 17	"So Rare"	Jimmy Dorsey Orchestra	
June 24	"So Rare"	Jimmy Dorsey Orchestra	
July 1	"(Let Me Be Your) Teddy Bear"	Elvis Presley	
July 8	"(Let Me Be Your) Teddy Bear"	Elvis Presley	
July 15	"(Let Me Be Your) Teddy Bear"	Elvis Presley	
July 22	"(Let Me Be Your) Teddy Bear"	Elvis Presley	
July 29	"(Let Me Be Your) Teddy Bear"	Elvis Presley	
August 5	"(Let Me Be Your) Teddy Bear"	Elvis Presley	
August 12	"Diana"	Paul Anka	
August 19	"(Let Me Be Your) Teddy Bear"	Elvis Presley	
August 26	"Honeycomb"	Jimmie Rodgers	
September 2	"Honeycomb"	Jimmie Rodgers	
September 9	"Honeycomb"	Jimmie Rodgers	
September 16	"Honeycomb"	Jimmie Rodgers	
September 23	"Mr. Lee"	The Bobbettes	
September 30	"Mr. Lee"	The Bobbettes	
October 7	"Wake Up Little Susie"	The Everly Brothers	
October 14	"Wake Up Little Susie"	The Everly Brothers	
October 21	"Wake Up Little Susie"	The Everly Brothers	
October 28	"My Special Angel"	Bobby Helms	
November 4	"Jailhouse Rock"	Elvis Presley	
November 11	"Silhouettes"	The Rays	
November 18	"You Send Me"	Sam Cooke	
November 25	"You Send Me"	Sam Cooke	
December 2	"Raunchy"	Bill Justis	
December 9	"Raunchy"	Bill Justis	
December 16	"Raunchy"	Bill Justis	
December 23	"At the Hop"	Danny & the Juniors	
December 30	"At the Hop"	Danny & the Juniors	

== See also ==
- 1957 in music
