= Sings the Country Music Hall of Fame Hits, Vol. 2 =

Studio album by Jerry Lee Lewis
- Released: 1969
- Studio: Columbia Studios, Nashville, Tennessee
- Genre: Country
- Length: 28:55
- Label: Smash
- Producer: Jerry Kennedy

Jerry Lee Lewis chronology
Sings the Country Music Hall of Fame Hits, Vol. 1 (1969)	Sings the Country Music Hall of Fame Hits, Vol. 2 (1969)	The Golden Cream of the Country (1970)

Sings the Country Music Hall of Fame Hits, Vol. 2 is the eleventh studio album by American musician and pianist Jerry Lee Lewis, released on Smash Records in 1969.

The album appeared on the Billboard 200 on May 10, 1969, staying for ten weeks and reaching a peak position of #124.

== Track listing ==
No.	Title	Writer(s)	Length
1.	"I Can't Stop Loving You"	Don Gibson	2:38
2.	"Fraulein"	Lawton Williams	2:30
3.	"He'll Have to Go"	Audrey Allison; Joe Allison	2:22
4.	"More and More"	Merle Kilgore	2:26
5.	"Why Don't You Love Me (Like You Used To Do)"	Hank Williams	1:39
6.	"It Makes No Difference Now"	Jimmie Davis; Floyd Tillman	2:26
7.	"Pick Me Up on Your Way Down"	Harlan Howard	2:32
8.	"One Has My Name (The Other Has My Heart)"	Hal Blair; Dearest Dean; Eddie Dean	2:41
9.	"I Get the Blues When It Rains"	Marcy Klauber; Harry Stoddard	2:15
10.	"Cold, Cold Heart"	Hank Williams	3:01
11.	"Burning Memories"	Mel Tillis; Wayne Walker	2:09
12.	"Sweet Thang" (with Linda Gail Lewis)	Nat Stuckey	2:16
Total length:			28:55
