= Champagne Ladies and Blue Ribbon Babies =

Studio album by Ferlin Husky
- Released: 1974
- Studio: Woodland (Nashville, Tennessee)
- Genre: Country
- Label: ABC
- Producer: Don Grant

Ferlin Husky chronology
Freckles and Polliwog Days (1974)	Champagne Ladies and Blue Ribbon Babies (1974)	Foster and Rice Songbook (1975)

Champagne Ladies and Blue Ribbon Babies is an album by American country music singer Ferlin Husky, released in 1974 by ABC Records.

== Charts ==
The album reached No. 43 in the Billboard Top Country LP's during a six-week run on the chart. It would be his last charting album.

The title track single "Champagne Ladies and Blue Ribbon Babies" reached No. 34 in the Billboard Hot Country Songs and the single of "Burning" reached No. 37. These were some of his last chart-making singles. "Wings of a Dove," a gospel song, was a No. 1 country hit in 1960 and was one of his signature songs.

== Track listing ==
Side A

1. "Champagne Ladies and Blue Ribbon Babies" (Dallas Frazier, A.L. "Doodle" Owens) – 2:41
2. "How Is Your Love Life" (Troy Shondell, Chuck Wadley) – 2:27
3. "Wings of a Dove" (Bob Ferguson) – 2:14
4. "Walls Instead of Bridges" (Barbara Shockley) – 2:59
5. "I Feel Better All Over" (Ken Rogers, Leon Smith) – 2:33

Side B

1. "Burning" (Jerry Foster, Bill Rice) – 2:39
2. "Good News" (Rory Bourke) – 2:43
3. "Ghost Story" (Joe Allen) – 2:34
4. "A Touch of Yesterday" (Dallas Frazier, A.L. "Doodle" Owens) – 2:14
5. "Gone" (Smokey Rogers) – 2:13

== Musicians ==
- Hargus "Pig" Robbins, Ron Oats - piano
- Buddy Harman, Jim Isbell - drums
- Billy Linneman, Jack Williams - bass guitar
- Weldon Myrick, Jeff Newman - steel guitar
- Dave Kirby, Grady Martin - electric guitar
- Ray Edenton, Bobby Thompson, Jim Colvard, Jimmy Capps - rhythm guitar
- Harold Bradley, Tommy Allsup, Kelso Herston - electric bass guitar
- Buddy Spicher, Shorty Lavender, Johnny Gimble - fiddle
- Farrell Morris - percussion

== Background Vocals ==
- The Jordanaires (Hoyt Hawkins, Neal Matthews, Jr., Gordon Stoker, Ray Walker)
- The Nashville Sound (Louis Nunley, Dotty Dillard, Gil Wright, Jeannine Walker, Ernest West)
- Marvin Husky

== Production ==
- Producer: Don Grant
- Recorded at: Woodland Sound Studios, Nashville, Tennessee
- Mixing Engineer: Rex Collier
- Mastering Engineer: Bob Sowell
- Album Photography: Ken Kim
