= Jimmy Duncan (songwriter) =

American singer-songwriter

Jimmy Duncan (née James Ollie Duncan, Jr.; 25 June 1927 in Houston – 9 November 2011 in Houston) was an American songwriter, singer, composer, author, arranger and producer, best known for his 1957 song "My Special Angel," a No.1 country/western hit for Bobby Helms. Duncan also co-wrote "String Along", which charted in 1960 for Fabian and in 1963 for Ricky Nelson.

In the late 1960s, Duncan owned a rock club in Houston named "The Living Eye"; nationally known groups such as the Electric Prunes and ? and the Mysterians played there, as well as local groups such as Lemon Fog.

In 1970, Duncan built a recording studio called "Soundville" in Houston and launched his own label, Soundville. Soundville Recording Studio closed under financial duress in 1972 and was sold to Bill Holford, as the new home of ACA Studios (Audiophile Custom Associates).

He should not be confused with the British songwriter, Jimmy Duncan, who wrote "Rosalyn" and "Big City" for The Pretty Things and "Everybody Knows", a minor hit in 1964 for Steve Lawrence.
