= The King Brothers =

British musical group

The King Brothers were a British pop vocal trio popular in the late 1950s and early 1960s. They are best remembered for their cover versions of "Standing on the Corner" and "A White Sport Coat (And A Pink Carnation)".

== Career ==
The group was composed of three brothers who first performed together professionally on the TV show Shop Window in 1952. Initially performing as The King Three, they appeared on the BBC Television early in their career on Six-Five Special, and by 1957 had been named "top vocal group" in the reader's poll for the NME. Their first hit on the UK Singles Chart was their cover of "A White Sport Coat", which hit No. 6 in 1957. In October 1960, they were again voted "top vocal group" in the NME reader's poll. They had a string of successful singles through to 1961, after which time they continued recording, but found their popularity waning.

Group leader Denis King later became an award-winning composer for television, film, and musicals; among other things, he wrote the theme music for The Adventures of Black Beauty and Lovejoy. Michael King was married to the actress Carol White, with whom he had two sons, Sean and Stephen.

== Members ==
- Denis King (born 25 July 1939, Hornchurch, Essex)
- Michael King (25 April 1935, Barking, Essex – 9 November 2018)
- William Anthony King (31 January 1937, Barking, Essex – 18 July 2023, Kent)

== Singles ==
Parlophone Records

- 1957 "Marianne" / "Little By Little"
- 1957 "A White Sport Coat (And A Pink Carnation)" / "Minne Minnehaha!" (UK No. 6)
- 1957 "In the Middle of an Island" / "Rockin' Shoes" (UK No. 19)
- 1957 "Wake Up Little Susie" / "Winter Wonderland" (UK No. 22)
- 1958 "Put A Light In The Window" / "Miss Otis Regrets" (UK No. 25)
- 1958 "Hand Me Down My Walking Cane" / "Six-5 Jive"
- 1958 "Moonlight and Roses" / "Torero"
- 1958 "Sitting In A Tree House" / "Father Time"
- 1959 "Leaning on a Lamp Post" / "Thank Heaven for Little Girls"
- 1959 "Hop, Skip And Jump" / "Civilization"
- 1959 "Makin' Love" / "Caribbean"
- 1960 "Standing on the Corner" / "The Waiter And The Porter And The Upstairs Maid" (UK No. 4)
- 1960 "Mais Oui" / "Gotta Feeling" (UK No. 16)
- 1960 "Doll House" / "Si Si Si" (UK No. 21)
- 1960 "Seventy-Six Trombones" / "I Like Everybody" (UK No. 19)
- 1961 "Goodbye Little Darling" / "Tuxedo Junction"
- 1961 "The Next Train Out Of Town" / "Sabre Dance"
- 1961 "The Language of Love" / "Go Tell Her For Me"
- 1962 "King Size Twist" / "Oh! What A Fool I've Been"
- 1962 "Everybody Back To Our Place/ "Don't Fly Away Flamingo"
- 1962 "Nicola" / "Way Down The Mountain"

Pye Records

- 1963 "One Boy Too Late" / "I've Got That Feeling Once Again"
- 1963 "Anyone Else" / "The Rainbow's End"

Oriole Records

- 1964 "Real Live Girl" / "Every Time It Rains"

CBS Records

- 1965 "Mister Sandman" / "I Want To Know"
- 1966 "Jo Jo" / "Peculiar"
- 1966 "Remember When (We Made These Memories)" / "Everytime I See You"

Page One Records

- 1966 "Symphony For Susan" / "My Time"
- 1967 "My Mammy" / "Some Of These Days"
- 1967 "My Mother's Eyes" / "I'm Old Fashioned"

Tupperware (EMI)

- 1967 There's No Business Like Our Business EP: "There's No Business Like Show Business" / "High Society" / "The Tupperware Brigade" / "Good News"

== See also ==
- Chappell & Co Ltd v Nestle Co Ltd [1960] AC 87, a court case fought over royalties for the song "Rockin' Shoes"
