= Country Music Is Here to Stay =

"Country Music is Here to Stay" is the first single by singer Ferlin Husky with Capitol Records under the pseudonym Simon Crum. The song peaked at No. 2 on Billboard Hot Country Songs chart for three weeks.

== Chart performance ==
| Chart (1958) | Peak position |
|---|---|
| U.S. Billboard Hot Country Songs | 2 |
