= Sings the Country Music Hall of Fame Hits, Vol. 1 =

Studio album by Jerry Lee Lewis
- Released: 1969
- Recorded: Columbia Studios, Nashville, Tennessee
- Genre: Country
- Length: 30:39
- Label: Smash
- Producer: Jerry Kennedy

Jerry Lee Lewis chronology
| She Still Comes Around (1969) | Sings the Country Music Hall of Fame Hits, Vol. 1 (1969) | Sings the Country Music Hall of Fame Hits, Vol. 2 (1969) |

Sings the Country Music Hall of Fame Hits, Vol. 1 is the tenth studio album by American musician and pianist Jerry Lee Lewis, released on Smash Records in 1969.

The album appeared on the Billboard 200 on May 10, 1969, staying for ten weeks and reaching a peak position of #127.

== Track listing ==
| No. | Title | Writer(s) | Length |
|---|---|---|---|
| 1. | "I Wonder Where You Are Tonight" | Johnny Bond | 2:39 |
| 2. | "I'm So Lonesome I Could Cry" | Hank Williams | 2:48 |
| 3. | "Jambalaya" | Williams | 2:13 |
| 4. | "Four Walls" | George Campbell; Marvin Moore | 2:43 |
| 5. | "Heartaches by the Number" | Harlan Howard | 2:34 |
| 6. | "Mom and Dad's Waltz" | Lefty Frizzell | 2:09 |
| 7. | "Sweet Dreams" | Don Gibson | 3:07 |
| 8. | "Born to Lose" | Ted Daffan | 2:24 |
| 9. | "Oh, Lonesome Me" | Gibson | 2:49 |
| 10. | "You've Still Got a Place in My Heart" | Leon Payne | 2:25 |
| 11. | "I Love You Because" | Payne | 2:24 |
| 12. | "Jackson" (with Linda Gail Lewis) | Billy Edd Wheeler; Jerry Leiber (as Gaby Rodgers) | 2:24 |
| Total length: | | | 30:39 |
