= Gumbo, Missouri =

Unincorporated community in Missouri, U.S.

Coordinates: 37°51′45″N 90°33′45″W

Gumbo is an unincorporated community in northwestern St. Francois County, in the U.S. state of Missouri. The community is located along Missouri Route 8 between Desloge and Leadwood. The meandering Big River lies to the north.

Gumbo most likely was so named on account of "gombo" dirt near the original town site.

During World War II, a large TNT plant was located five miles west of Gumbo.

== Notable people ==
- Ferlin Husky, country music singer, member of the Country Music Hall of Fame
- Evelyn Tripp, leading fashion model of the 1950s and 1960s
- Jeff Eaton, bassist for Split Lip Rayfield
