= Lawton Williams =

American country singer (1922–2007)

- Between Truck Stops, with Williams depicted in cover art

Background information
- Born: Lawton Williams; July 24, 1922; Troy, Tennessee, United States
- Died: July 27, 2007 (aged 85) Fort Worth, Texas, United States
- Genre: Country
- Occupations: Singer, songwriter, musician
- Instruments: Vocals; guitar
- Years active: 1947–2003
- Labels: Coral, RCA Victor, Decca

Lawton Williams (July 24, 1922 – July 27, 2007) was an American country music singer and songwriter.

Williams taught himself to play guitar as a teenager but made no steps towards a musical career until, while serving in World War II, he met Floyd Tillman who acted as a mentor to him. After being discharged from the Army, Williams cut several initial singles for small local labels under the name "Slim Williams" from 1947 to 1950.

His major label debut, in 1951 on Coral, was "Everlastin' Love"/"Lovin' Overtime"; this was also his first release as Lawton Williams. During the 1950s he cut several more singles for various labels, some under the name of "Ed Lawton", without chart success.

Others, however, found greater success with songs written by Williams. In 1957, Bobby Helms recorded Williams' song "Fraulein", allegedly written about a pretty German woman whom Williams had dated during his military service. Such relationships between U.S. servicemen and German women were common during and after the occupation of Germany, however, Williams remained stateside during his service and was never deployed overseas so the song is not believed to be a narrative of any personal experience. Nevertheless, it reached No. 1 on the Billboard country charts, remaining there for four weeks and launching Helms on his career as a singer. It also reached No. 16 in the main Billboard pop chart, and went on to win the Country Song of the Year Award from both Billboard and Cashbox. Bobby Braddock said that "Fraulein" was called "the Texas national anthem" due to its popularity there.

Williams was now in demand as a songwriter. Hank Locklin recorded his "Geisha Girl" and reached No. 4 in the country charts, while "Color Of The Blues", co-written with George Jones, was a country No. 10 for Jones and was more recently covered by Elvis Costello. "I'll Always Be Your Fraulein" was an answer song to "Fraulein", co-written with Roy Botkin and Wally Jarvis, reaching No. 10 on the country charts in 1957 for Kitty Wells. He also wrote "Shame On Me", which in 1962 was the first song by Bobby Bare to reach the country charts.

Williams continued to perform and record himself as well as composing songs for others, but chart success continued to prove elusive; not until 1962 did he score a hit in his own right, with "Anywhere There's People" on Mercury, reaching #13; ironically this was actually written not by Williams but by Steve Karliski. His only other chart hit was "Everything's OK On The LBJ" (#40, 1964). This may have been due to his choice to adhere to a pure country style in his releases, rather than allowing any elements of pop or rockabilly to influence his recordings as many country musicians did around this era.

Further hits for other performers with Williams' songs continued to ensure his status, though, such as "Paper Face" (Hank Locklin), "Señor Santa Claus" (Jim Reeves), and "It Just Tears Me Up" which was the final chart hit for his friend Floyd Tillman. There were also several other covers of "Fraulein" by singers such as Bob Luman, Eddy Arnold and Roy Drusky. A later Williams-composed hit was "Farewell Party"; originally released by Williams on Allstar Records in September 1960, it was covered by Little Jimmy Dickens in 1961, without chart success for either at the time. It was again covered in 1978 by Gene Watson and this version reached No. 5 on the US country charts in 1979.

Williams remained primarily a singles artist, and did not issue an album of his own performances until 1971's "Between Truck Stops" on Mega Records.

He was a frequent live performer with many appearances on country music TV and radio shows, and continued to both compose and perform up until very shortly before his death just after his 85th birthday, saying that "As long as country music fans want to hear traditional country music, that's what I'll be writing and recording." His daughter reported that even on his deathbed, he was still working on lyrics.
