= Wings of a Dove (Bob Ferguson song) =

1960 single by Ferlin Husky

Single by Ferlin Husky
- B-side: "Next to Jimmy"
- Released: July 1960
- Recorded: May 24, 1960
- Studio: Bradley Studios, Nashville, Tennessee
- Genre: Country
- Length: 2:18
- Label: Capitol
- Songwriter: Bob Ferguson
- Producer: Ken Nelson

Ferlin Husky singles chronology
"Black Sheep" (1959)	"Wings of a Dove" (1960)	"Willow Tree" (1961)

"Wings of a Dove' is a country song written by Bob Ferguson in 1958. It was popularized when it was recorded by Ferlin Husky in 1960. His recording topped the country charts for 10 nonconsecutive weeks. It was Ferlin Husky's third and final number one on the country chart, spending nine months on it. "Wings of a Dove" was successful on the pop charts, as well, peaking at number 12 on the Hot 100. In 1987, Broadcast Music Incorporated awarded Ferguson with the "million air" plays for the "Wings of a Dove".

The song alludes to a passage from the Bible about God sending Noah a dove during the flood in Genesis 8:6-12. The title is inspired from Psalms 55:7 ("wings like a dove"). Dolly Parton and Porter Wagoner's cover versions include a verse not in the original, referring to another passage about a dove in Matthew 3:16 where: "After his baptism, as Jesus came up out of the water, the heavens were opened and he saw the Spirit of God descending like a dove and settling on him."

== Chart performance ==
Chart (1960–61)	Peak position
U.S. Billboard Hot C&W Sides	1
U.S. Billboard Hot 100	12

== Covers ==
The song has also been covered by many artists, including Charley Pride, Bonnie Guitar, The Jordanaires, George Jones, Hal Ketchum, Loretta Lynn, Dolly Parton, Ricky Skaggs and The Whites, The Wilders, and Jim Witter, among others. Nanci Griffith and Lucinda Williams recorded a duet for Griffith's album Other Voices, Too (A Trip Back to Bountiful). Dolly Parton, Tammy Wynette, and Loretta Lynn included it on their 1993 album Honky Tonk Angels.

Bob Dylan quoted a lyric from it in his 2020 song "I've Made Up My Mind to Give Myself to You" ("If I had the wings of a snow-white dove / I'd preach the gospel, the gospel of love").

== Film ==
- Robert Duvall sang the tune in the 1983 movie Tender Mercies. The movie's soundtrack included a version sung by Duvall and Gail Youngs.
- A rendition by Point of Grace appeared on the 2002 soundtrack of the movie Joshua.
