= Mr. Lee (song) =

Single by The Bobbettes
- B-side: "Look at the Stars"
- Released: 1957
- Genre: Doo-wop
- Length: 2:14
- Label: Atlantic
- Songwriter(s): Emma Ruth Pought; Helen Gathers; Jannie Pought; Laura E. Webb; Reather E. Dixon

"Mr. Lee" is a 1957 single by The Bobbettes. The song peaked at #1 on the CHUM Chart in Canada and on national R&B charts in the United States in 1957. It was included in Robert Christgau's "Basic Record Library" of 1950s and 1960s recordings, published in Christgau's Record Guide: Rock Albums of the Seventies (1981).

== Background ==
"Mr. Lee" was written about a schoolteacher members of the group had. Contrary to popular belief, the song was originally written not to ridicule but to describe their former teacher factually. Upon meeting executives from Atlantic Records, Atlantic had the lyrics of "Mr. Lee" changed to create a love song. Atlantic demanded the original lyric "ugliest teacher" to be changed to "handsomest sweetie".

== Recording ==
The Bobbettes recorded "Mr. Lee" during a recording session with Atlantic Records in 1957. Emma Pought and Reather Dixon shared the lead vocals on the recording. Emma Pought and Helen Gathers wrote three other songs during the session.

== Composition ==
The music of "Mr. Lee" was built around a blues sequence and had Jesse Powell on tenor saxophone alongside boogie-woogie music.

== Chart performance ==
"Mr. Lee" became the first recording to simultaneously become a Top Ten hit single—peaking at #6 on pop charts from Billboard, Cashbox and Music Vendor—and reach #1 on the R&B charts in the United States.

Diana Ross's cover peaked in the UK at #58 in 1988.

== Legacy ==
In 1959, The Bobbettes recorded an answer song to "Mr. Lee" called "I Shot Mr. Lee" with Atlantic Records. After Atlantic decided to shelve the song, The Bobbettes redid the song the following year with Triple-X Records. "I Shot Mr. Lee" peaked at #52 on The Hot 100. A lawsuit was later declared in July 1960 after Atlantic sued Triple-X for copyright infringement. A ruling ordered the seizure of copies of the Triple-X recording. "Mr. Lee" was #79 on Billboard's list of 100 Greatest Girl Group Songs of All Time.

== Certifications and awards ==
"Mr. Lee" sold 2 million copies and led The Bobbettes to be awarded with platinum records by Atlantic Records.

== Popular culture ==
"Mr. Lee" was featured in the soundtrack for Stand By Me and included in the 1987 film The Big Town.

It also appeared in an episode of The Cosby Show. Clair (Phylicia Rashad) and her high school friend (Leslie Uggams) put on wigs and danced around the room as they sang it.

In the United Kingdom, the song was used in the CITV Saturday Morning TV Show Ministry of Mayhem. It was used as the theme song to introduce the character Mr Lee, who would deliver the ringtones for the Name That Tone game. Mr. Lee was played by Vincent Wong.

In 1985, it was used in the soundtrack of the Miami Vice episode, Golden Triangle-Part 2.

DJ Frank E. Lee of WXRT in Chicago used "Mr. Lee" as his show intro.

== Charts ==
=== The Bobbettes version ===
Chart (1957)	Peak position
Canada (CHUM)	1
Best Sellers in Stores (Billboard)	7
Most Played By Jockeys (Billboard)	6
Most Played R&B by Jockeys (Billboard)	1
R&B Best Sellers in Stores (Billboard)	2
Top Rhythm and Blues Records (Billboard)	5

=== Diana Ross version ===
Chart (1988)	Peak position
UK Singles (OCC)	58

== See also ==
- List of CHUM number-one singles of 1957
