= Blue Monday (1954 song) =

1954 song written by Dave Bartholomew

Single by Fats Domino

from the album This is Fats Domino!
- B-side: "What's The Reason I'm Not Pleasing You"
- Released: 1956
- Recorded: 1956
- Genre: Rhythm and blues
- Length: 2:20
- Label: Imperial; 5417
- Songwriter: Dave Bartholomew

Fats Domino singles chronology
"Blueberry Hill" (1956)	"Blue Monday" (1956)	"What's The Reason I'm Not Pleasing You" (1956)

Official Audio
- "Blue Monday" on YouTube

"Blue Monday" is a song written by Dave Bartholomew, first recorded in 1953 by Smiley Lewis and issued as a single, in January 1954, on Imperial Records (catalog #5268). The single, with a slow-rocking beat, features an instrumental electric guitar solo by Lewis.

== Fats Domino version ==
It was later popularized in a recording by Fats Domino in 1956, and became his 7th pop single. It was also released on Imperial (catalog #5417), with the songwriting credit shared between him and Bartholomew. The baritone saxophone solo is by Herbert Hardesty.

The song debuted on the Billboard Top 100 (later known as the Hot 100) chart on January 5, 1957, at number 58. It would climb up to number 9 in February, and remain there for 3 weeks. It peaked at number 23 on the UK charts. The January 5 edition 'Rhythm & Blues Notes' column on Billboard called the song the "hottest new record around" and stated orders stood around the 350,000 mark. It would also spend 8 consecutive weeks at number 1 on the R&B chart.

Domino's cover was featured in the 1956 film The Girl Can't Help It.

The song title was used for a 2006 biography of Domino by Rick Coleman.

== Cat Stevens version ==
Cat Stevens recorded the song in November 1975 alongside several other unfinished tracks. The song remained unreleased until 2001, when it was finally included on a career-spanning box set.

Stevens also covered the song during a September 1976 jam session with Ringo Starr. Additionally, Stevens sang the song several times live during his 1976 Majikat tour, including one which was a tribute to Fats's birthday.
