= My Special Angel =

1957 song written by Jimmy Duncan

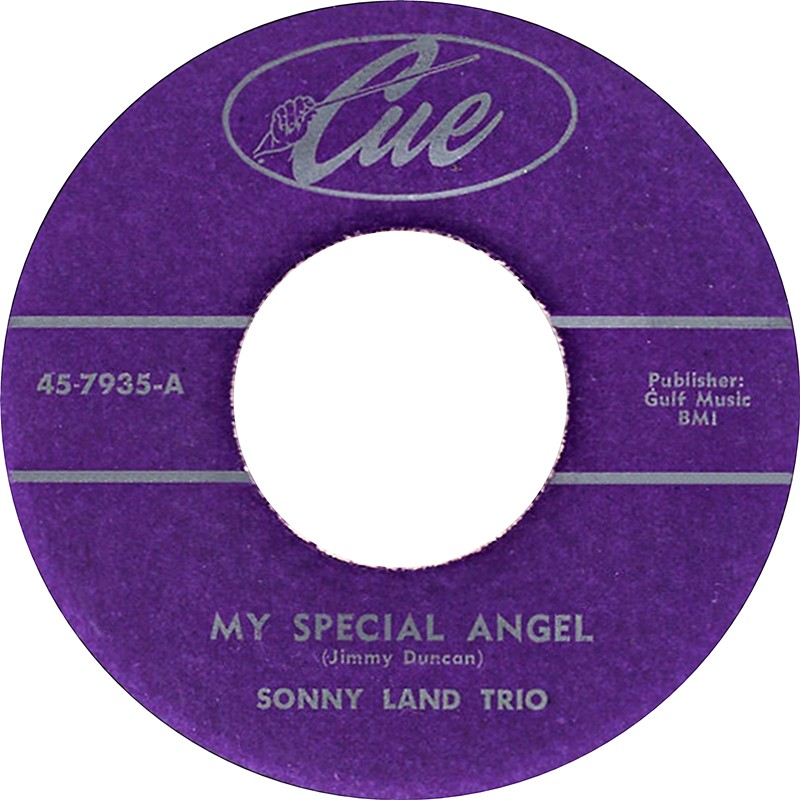

Single by Sonny Land Trio
- B-side: "Someone To Take Your Place"
- Released: July 1957
- Recorded: 1956
- Genre: Traditional pop
- Length: 2:00
- Label: Cue
- Songwriter: Jimmy Duncan

Sonny Land Trio singles chronology
"My Special Angel" (1957)	"Sock Hop" (1958)

Audio
- "My Special Angel" on YouTube

"My Special Angel"
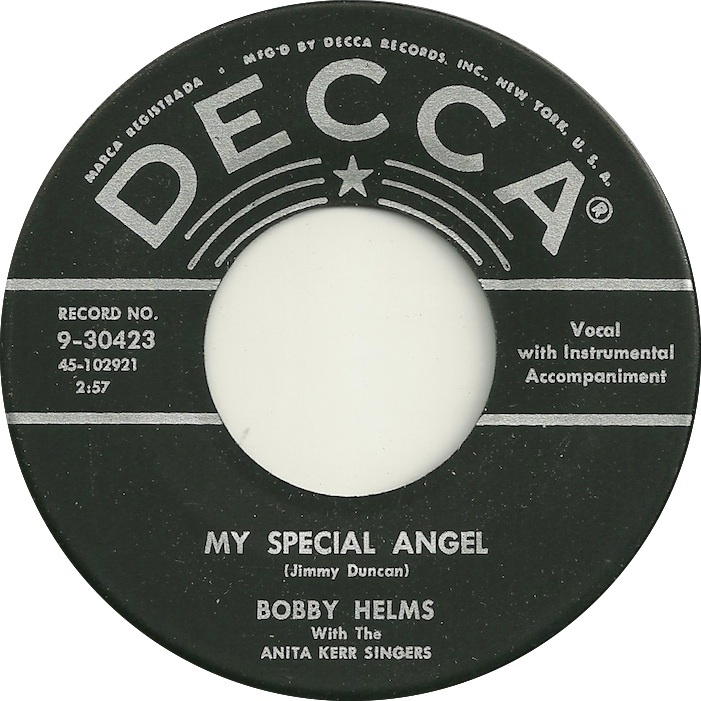
- Side A of the original US single

Single by Bobby Helms

from the album Sings to My Special Angel
- B-side: "Standing at the End of My World"
- Released: August 26, 1957
- Recorded: July 1957
- Studio: Bradley Studios, Nashville, Tennessee
- Genre: Country; R&B
- Length: 2:57
- Label: Decca
- Songwriter: Jimmy Duncan

Bobby Helms singles chronology
"Fraulein" (1957)	"My Special Angel" (1957)	"Jingle Bell Rock" (1957)

Audio
- "My Special Angel" on YouTube

"My Special Angel"
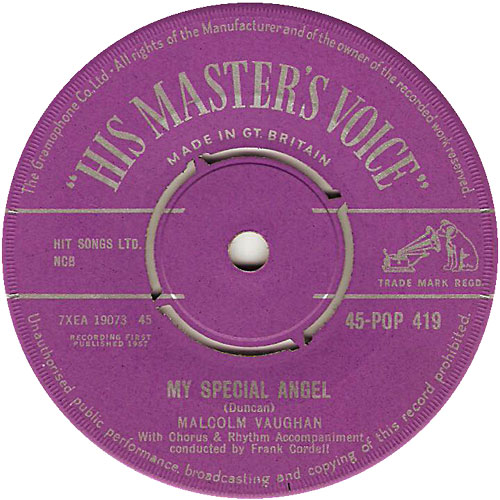
- Side A of the original UK single

Single by Malcolm Vaughan
- B-side: "The Heart of a Child"
- Released: November 1957
- Recorded: 1957
- Genre: Traditional pop
- Length: 2:47
- Label: His Master's Voice
- Songwriter: Jimmy Duncan

Malcolm Vaughan singles chronology
"Oh My Papa" (1957)	"My Special Angel" (1957)	"To Be Loved" (1958)

Audio
- "My Special Angel" on YouTube

"My Special Angel"

Single by The Vogues

from the album Turn Around, Look at Me
- B-side: "I Keep It Hid"
- Released: August 1968
- Genre: Pop
- Length: 2:57
- Label: Reprise
- Songwriter: Jimmy Duncan
- Producer: Dick Glasser

The Vogues singles chronology
"Turn Around, Look at Me" (1968)	"My Special Angel" (1968)	"Till" (1968)

Audio
- "My Special Angel" on YouTube

"My Special Angel" is a popular song by Jimmy Duncan, published in 1957.

It was first recorded by the Sonny Land Trio and released by them in 1957, and was a crossover hit that year for Bobby Helms. "My Special Angel", which Helms recorded at Bradley Studios in Nashville, Tennessee, in July 1957, peaked at number seven on the Billboard Hot 100 chart and spent four weeks at number one on the US country music chart. The single made the rhythm and blues chart, as well, topping out at number eight. Backing vocals were sung by the Anita Kerr Singers.

== Charts ==
=== Bobby Helms version ===
Chart (1957)	Peak position
UK (New Musical Express)	22
US Billboard Hot 100	7
US Billboard C&W Best Sellers in Stores	1
US Billboard R&B singles	8

=== Malcolm Vaughan version ===
Chart (1957–1958)	Peak position
UK (New Musical Express)	3

=== The Vogues version ===
Chart (1968)	Peak position
Australia (Kent Music Report)	36
Canada RPM Top Singles	6
US Billboard Hot 100	7
US Easy Listening (Billboard)	1

== Album appearances ==
The song was the lead off track on the 1957 album Sings To My Special Angel (Decca DL 8638). It appeared on the 1959 compilation album The Original Hit Performances! The Late Fifties (Decca DL 4005), and on the 1976 oldies compilation American Graffiti Vol. III (MCA2-8008). Also in 1976, the song was included in a 3-LP box set compilation from Candlelite Music, Country Music Cavalcade: Nashville Graffitti.

== Other notable cover versions ==
- In the United Kingdom, a version recorded by Welsh singer Malcolm Vaughan spent 14 weeks on the charts, peaking at number three in 1957.
- The song was revived in 1968 by the Vogues, with their version reaching number seven on the Hot 100 chart and faring even better on the Easy Listening chart, where it spent two weeks at number one in October 1968.

== See also ==
- List of CHUM number-one singles of 1957
- List of number-one country singles of 1957 (U.S.)
- List of number-one adult contemporary singles of 1968 (U.S.)
