= The Bobbettes =

American R&B girl group

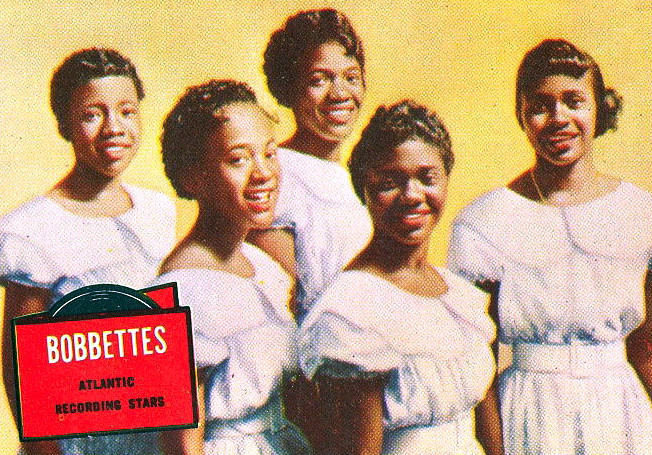
- The Bobbettes (1957)

Background information
- Origin: East Harlem, New York, United States
- Genres: R&B
- Years active: 1955–1974
- Past members: Jannie Pought; Emma Pought; Reather Dixon; Laura Webb; Helen Gathers

The Bobbettes were an American R&B girl group who had a 1957 top 10 hit song called "Mr. Lee". The group initially existed from 1955 to 1974 and included Jannie Pought (1945–1980), Emma Pought (born 1942), Reather Dixon (1944–2014), Laura Webb (1941–2001), and Helen Gathers (1942–2011).

== History ==
The group, which originally formed in East Harlem, New York, in 1955, was first known as "The Harlem Queens". The girls first met while singing at the Glee Club at P.S. 109 in Spanish Harlem. They were soon discovered by James Dailey, a record producer, who also became their manager, while playing a concert at the Apollo Theater's amateur night, and were signed to a recording contract on the Atlantic label. The girls lived in the housing projects of 1905 Second Ave and 99th Street and sang in the hallways of the building and downstairs in the playground.

In 1957, the girls released their first hit single, "Mr. Lee", an uptempo song in which the narrator proclaims her devotion to her crush—her school teacher. The girls actually disliked the real-life Mr. Lee and the original lyrics to the song were something of a put-down, but Atlantic insisted the group revise the lyrics before recording the song. The single, backed by "Look at the Stars", became their biggest hit recording, peaking at #6 on the Billboard Pop singles chart and spending four weeks at #1 on the R&B chart. This made the Bobbettes the first girl group to release a #1 R&B hit that also made the pop top 10. The song would later be covered by Diana Ross on the European version of her 1987 album Red Hot Rhythm & Blues. The personnel on "Mr. Lee" included Jesse Powell on tenor sax, Allan Hanlon and Al Caiola on guitar, Ray Ellis on piano, Milt Hinton on bass, and Joe Marshall on drums. Billboard named the song #79 on their list of 100 Greatest Girl Group Songs of All Time.

After a series of novelty songs for Atlantic that were unsuccessful, they recorded the original recording of "I Shot Mr. Lee". Atlantic refused the song and the group left the label and signed with Teddy Vann and a new version was issued on the small Triple-X label. It started to climb the charts rapidly, eventually reaching #52 on the Billboard Hot 100, whereupon Atlantic released their own version of the song.

Over the next few years they followed up that single with such other recordings as "Have Mercy Baby", "You Are My Sweetheart", "You Belong to Me", and "Dance with Me Georgie". They then signed with End Records and released the songs "Teach Me Tonight" and "I Don't Like It Like That" (answer to Chris Kenner's "I Like It Like That"). Although the recording of "I Don't Like It Like That" was the girls' last chart record, they continued to record for a series of record labels, including Diamond, RCA Victor and Mayhew, before disbanding in 1974. They also toured the oldies circuits for many years having reformed after their initial breakup. Other recordings by the Bobbettes include, "Oh My Pa-Pa", "Speedy", "Zoomy", and "Rock and Ree-ah-Zole (The Teenage Talk)". Their single of "I've Gotta Face The World" on RCA Victor is a Northern soul single.

In 1980, Jannie Pought was stabbed to death at age 34 by a stranger in New Jersey.

Reather Dixon (born on May 1, 1944, in Bamberg, South Carolina) died on January 8, 2014, at age 69.

The Bobbettes were nominated for induction in the Vocal Group Hall of Fame.

== Discography ==
=== Singles ===
Year	Title (A-Side, B-Side)	Chart positions	
Year	Title (A-Side, B-Side)	US	US R&B
1957	"Mr. Lee" b/w "Look at the Stars"	6	1
1957	"Speedy" b/w "Come-A Come-A"	—	—
1958	"Zoomy" b/w "Rock and Ree-Ah-Zole"	—	—
1958	"The Dream" b/w "Um Bow Bow"	—	—
1959	"Don't Say Goodnight" b/w "You Are My Sweetheart"	—	—
1960	"I Shot Mr. Lee" b/w "Untrue Love"	52	—
1960	"Have Mercy Baby" b/w "Dance with Me Georgie"	66; 95	—
1960	"Oh My Papa" b/w "I Cried"	—	—
1961	"Teach Me Tonight" b/w "Mr Johnny Q"	—	—
1961	"I Don't Like It Like That, Part 1" b/w "Part 2"	72	—
1961	"Looking for a Lover" b/w "Are You Satisfied"	—	—
1962	"My Dearest" b/w "I'm Stepping Out Tonight"	—	—
1962	"Over There" b/w "Loneliness"	—	—
1962	"The Broken Heart" b/w "Mama Papa"	—	—
1962	"Teddy" b/w "Row, Row, Row"	—	—
1963	"Close Your Eyes" b/w "Somebody Bad Stole De Wedding Bell"	—	—
1964	"My Mama Said" b/w "Sandman"	—	—
1964	"In Paradise" b/w "I'm Climbing a Mountain"	—	—
1965	"You Ain't Seen Nothing Yet" b/w "I'm Climbing a Mountain"	—	—
1966	"Having Fun" b/w "I've Gotta Face the World"	—	—
1966	"It's All Over" b/w "Happy Go Lucky Me"	—	—
1971	"That's a Bad Thing to Know" b/w "All in Your Mind"	—	—
1972	"Tighten Up Your Own" b/w "Looking for a New Love"	—	—
1974	"It Won't Work Out" b/w "Good Man"	—	—
"—" denotes releases that did not chart.
