= Ferlin Husky =

American country music singer (1925–2011)

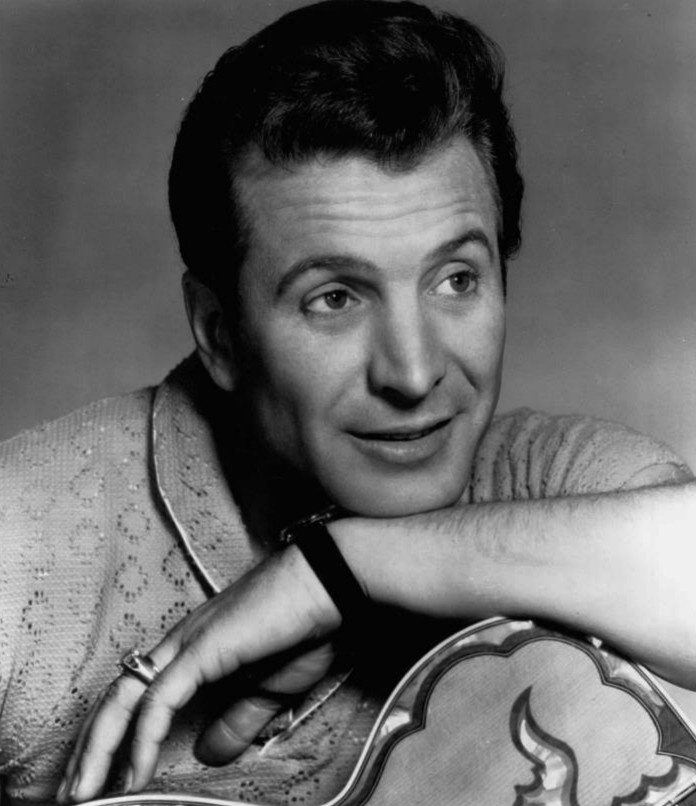
- Husky in 1962

Background information
- Also known as: Terry Preston, Simon Crum
- Born: Ferlin Eugene Husky; December 3, 1925; Gumbo, Missouri, U.S.
- Died: March 17, 2011 (aged 85) Westmoreland, Tennessee, U.S.
- Genres: Country
- Occupation: Singer
- Instruments: Vocals, guitar
- Years active: 1945–2011
- Labels: Capitol Records (1953–1972); ABC Records (1972–1975)
- Website: FerlinHusky.com

Ferlin Eugene Husky (December 3, 1925 – March 17, 2011) was an American country music singer who was equally adept at honky-tonk, ballads, spoken recitations, rockabilly and pop tunes.

From 1948 to 1953, he recorded under the stage name Terry Preston. He also created and recorded as the comic, outspoken hayseed character, Simon Crum. In the 1950s and '60s, his hits included "Gone" and "Wings of a Dove", each reaching number one on the country charts. Between 1953 and 1975, he had 11 top 10 hits, two dozen top 20 hits and a total of 50 songs in Billboard magazine's top 100 country songs. His versatility and matinee-idol looks propelled a seven-decade entertainment career. In 2010, he was inducted into the Country Music Hall of Fame.

== Biography ==
Ferlin Husky was born in Gumbo, Missouri, an unincorporated community in northwestern St. Francois County, Missouri. His mother named him Furland, but his name was misspelled on his birth certificate. Husky grew up on a farm near Flat River and attended school in Irondale. An uncle taught him to play the guitar. After dropping out of high school, he moved to St. Louis, where he worked as a truck driver and steel mill worker while performing in honky tonks at night.

During World War II, Husky served in the United States Merchant Marine for five years, entertaining troops on transport ships. His website states that his ship participated in the D-Day invasion of Cherbourg. His Simon Crum character evolved from stories he told during those years about a Missouri neighbor named Simon Crump.

After the war, Husky continued to develop his Simon Crum character while working as a disc jockey in Missouri and then in Bakersfield, California, into the late 1940s. He began using the stage name Terry Preston at the suggestion of Smiley Burnette who claimed Ferlin Husky would never work on a marquee. He signed with Capitol Records in 1953 as a honky-tonk singer under the guidance of Cliffie Stone, who also managed Tennessee Ernie Ford. When at Capitol, he returned to using his given name although for his first few singles his last named was listed as "Huskey". A few singles failed before "A Dear John Letter" with Jean Shepard became a number one hit that year topping Billboard magazine's country charts and reaching number four on its pop charts. They followed it up that year with "Forgive Me John" which reached number four on Billboard's Most Played Country and Western Juke Boxes chart and number 24 on its Hot 100 chart turning the unknown singers into star performers in the United States. In 1955, Husky had a solo hit with "I Feel Better All Over (More Than Anywheres Else)" / "Little Tom". As Simon Crum, he signed a separate contract with Capitol Records and began releasing records, the biggest of which was 1959's "Country Music is Here to Stay" reaching number two for three weeks.

In the late 1950s, Husky had a long string of hits, including the number one "Gone" which stayed at the top of the charts for ten weeks in 1957 and was on the charts for a total of 27 weeks. (Husky had previously recorded the song in 1952 as Terry Preston, but the earlier version lacked the newly emerging Nashville sound production of Bradley Studios, which included strings and backup singers). "Gone" was a crossover success, also reaching number four on the pop music chart. It sold over one million copies, and was awarded a gold disc. The song's popularity led to a stint as a summer replacement host in 1957 on CBS-TV's Arthur Godfrey's Talent Scouts.

He began acting, appearing on the Kraft Television Theatre, and played himself in the 1957 film Mister Rock and Roll (his website states he had bit parts in 18 films, including with Zsa Zsa Gabor and Mamie Van Doren). He received sole top billing in a 1971 low budget, back country film with the film's opening credits stating, "Ferlin Husky in Swamp Girl".

in 1960, Bob Ferguson's "Wings of a Dove" became his biggest hit, topping the country charts for 10 weeks and reaching number 12 on the pop chart. Husky was also known for his ability to imitate other popular country singers, including Tennessee Ernie Ford and Kitty Wells.

Although he did not have more chart-toppers, he charted three dozen hits between 1961 and 1972, with the biggest being "Once" (1967) and "Just for You" (1968). In late 1972, after over 20 years with Capitol, Husky signed with ABC Records, where he scored several top 40 hits into 1975, with the biggest being the top 20 "Rosie Cries a Lot" (1973). Husky briefly retired in 1977 following heart surgery, then resumed touring. He remained a popular concert draw, performing at the Grand Ole Opry and elsewhere. He was married four times and for the last six years of his life lived with his long-time love, Leona Williams (former wife of Merle Haggard).

Husky suffered from cardiopathy for many years and was hospitalized several times beginning in the late 1970s, including for heart surgery in 2005 and for blood clots in his legs in 2007. He was admitted to St. John's Hospital in Springfield, Missouri, on April 19, 2009, with congestive heart failure and pneumonia. On July 15, 2009, his spokesman said he was recuperating at home after being released from a Nashville hospital.

On February 23, 2010, the Country Music Association announced his induction into the Country Music Hall of Fame. He was heralded for his vocal and comic prowess—and "all around showmanship"—that left a legacy as "one of the best entertainers country music has ever produced".

On January 16, 2011, he was honored at West St. Francois County High School in Leadwood, Missouri, where local singers and the high-school choir sang some of his hits. Husky also donated several items of memorabilia, including his Country Music Hall of Fame award, to the city of Leadwood which are permanently stored at the high school.

On March 8, 2011, Husky was hospitalized again after several days after not feeling well. By the weekend, he had improved and moved out of the coronary care unit. On March 17, he died of congestive heart failure at his daughter's home in Westmoreland, Tennessee.

He was buried next to his son, Danny Louis Husky, in Hendersonville Memory Gardens in Hendersonville, Tennessee.

== Honors ==
Ferlin Husky was one of the first country singers to get a star on the Hollywood Walk of Fame for his recordings. It is at 6675 Hollywood Blvd.

The street that runs through the city park in Leadwood, Missouri, is named for him.

== Discography ==
=== Albums ===
Year	Album	US Country	Label
1956	Songs of the Home and Heart	—	Capitol
1957	Boulevard of Broken Dreams	—	Capitol
1958	Sittin' on a Rainbow	—	Capitol
1959	Born to Lose	—	Capitol
1959	Ferlin Husky	—	King
1960	Easy Livin'	—	King
1960	Ferlin's Favorites	—	Capitol
1960	"Gone"	—	Capitol
1961	Walkin' and a Hummin'	—	Capitol
1961	Memories of Home	—	Capitol
1962	Some of My Favorites	—	Capitol
1963	The Unpredictable Simon Crum	—	Capitol
1963	The Heart and Soul of Ferlin Husky	—	Capitol
1963	The Hits of Ferlin Husky	—	Capitol
1964	By Request	20	Capitol
1965	True True Lovin'	—	Capitol
1966	Ferlin Husky Sings the Songs of Music City, U.S.A.	20	Capitol
1966	I Could Sing All Night	18	Capitol
1967	What Am I Gonna Do Now?	22	Capitol
1967	Christmas All Year Long	—	Capitol
1968	Just for You (and the Hush Puppies)	19	Capitol
1968	Where No One Stands Alone	—	Capitol
1968	White Fences and Evergreen Trees	44	Capitol
1969	The Best of Ferlin Husky	42	Capitol
1969	That's Why I Love You So Much	24	Capitol
1970	Your Love Is Heavenly Sunshine	25	Capitol
1970	Green Green Grass of Home	—	Capitol
1970	Your Sweet Love Lifted Me	31	Capitol
1971	One More Time	35	Capitol
1972	Just Plain Lonely	39	Capitol
1973	True True Lovin'	—	ABC
1973	Sweet Honky Tonk	—	ABC
1974	Freckles and Polliwog Days	44	ABC
1974	Champagne Ladies and Blue Ribbon Babies	43	ABC
1975	Foster and Rice Songbook	—	ABC

=== Singles ===
Year	Single	Chart Positions			Album
Year	Single	US Country	US	CAN Country	Album
1953	"A Dear John Letter" (w/ Jean Shepard)	1	4	—	singles only
1953	"Forgive Me, John" (w/ Jean Shepard)	4	24	—	singles only
1955	"I Feel Better All Over (More Than Anywhere's Else)"	6	—	—	singles only
1955	"Little Tom"	7	—	—	singles only
1955	"Cuzz Yore So Sweet" (as Simon Crum)	5	—	—	The Unpredictable Simon Crum
1955	"I'll Baby Sit with You" (w/ His Hush Puppies)	14	—	—	single only
1957	"Gone"	1	4	—	"Gone"
1957	"A Fallen Star"	8	47	—	"Gone"
1957	"Prize Possession"	12	—	—	"Gone"
1958	"I Will"	23	—	—	"Gone"
1958	"Country Music is Here to Stay" (as Simon Crum)	2	—	—	The Unpredictable Simon Crum
1959	"My Reason for Living"	14	—	—	"Gone"
1959	"Draggin' the River"	11	—	—	singles only
1959	"Black Sheep"	21	—	—	singles only
1960	"Wings of a Dove"	1	12	—	singles only
1961	"Willow Tree"	23	—	—	singles only
1962	"The Waltz You Saved for Me"	13	94	—	Some of My Favorites
1962	"Somebody Save Me"	16	—	—	singles only
1962	"Stand Up"	28	—	—	singles only
1962	"It Was You"	21	—	—	singles only
1964	"Timber I'm Falling"	13	—	—	By Request
1965	"True True Lovin'"	46	—	—	True True Lovin'
1965	"Money Greases the Wheels"	48	—	—	Ferlin Husky Sings the Songs of Music City, U.S.A.
1966	"I Could Sing All Night"	27	—	—	I Could Sing All Night
1966	"I Hear Little Rock Calling"	17	—	—	I Could Sing All Night
1967	"Once"	4	—	—	I Could Sing All Night
1967	"What Am I Gonna Do Now"	37	—	—	What Am I Gonna Do Now?
1967	"You Pushed Me Too Far"	14	—	—	Just for You
1968	"Just for You"	4	—	—	Just for You
1968	"I Promised You the World"	26	—	13	single only
1968	"White Fences and Evergreen Trees"	25	—	18	White Fences and Evergreen Trees
1969	"Flat River, MO"	33	—	—	White Fences and Evergreen Trees
1969	"That's Why I Love You So Much"	16	—	11	That's Why I Love You So Much
1969	"Every Step of the Way"	21	—	23	Your Love Is Heavenly Sunshine
1970	"Heavenly Sunshine"	11	—	6	Your Love Is Heavenly Sunshine
1970	"Your Sweet Love Lifted Me"	45	—	—	One More Time
1971	"Sweet Misery"	14	—	23	One More Time
1971	"One More Time"	28	—	31	One More Time
1971	"Open Up the Book (And Take a Look)"	45	—	—	single only
1972	"Just Plain Lonely"	39	—	—	Just Plain Lonely
1972	"How Could You Be Anything But Love"	53	—	—	single only
1973	"True True Lovin'" (re-recording)	35	—	29	True True Lovin'
1973	"Between Me and Blue"	46	—	75	Sweet Honky Tonk
1973	"Baby's Blue"	75	—	—	Sweet Honky Tonk
1973	"Rosie Cries a Lot"	17	—	33	Sweet Honky Tonk
1974	"Freckles and Polliwog Days"	26	—	36	Freckles and Polliwog Days
1974	"A Room for a Boy...Never Used"	60	—	—	Freckles and Polliwog Days
1975	"Champagne Ladies and Blue Ribbon Babies"	34	—	—	Champagne Ladies and Blue Ribbon Babies
1975	"Burning"	37	—	—	Champagne Ladies and Blue Ribbon Babies
1975	"An Old Memory (Got in My Eye)"	90	—	—	Foster and Rice Songbook
1975	"She's Not Yours Anymore"	74	—	—	Foster and Rice Songbook
