= A White Sport Coat =

"A White Sport Coat (And A Pink Carnation)"

Single by Marty Robbins

from the album Marty's Greatest Hits
- B-side: "Grown-Up Tears"
- Released: March 1957
- Recorded: January 25, 1957
- Studio: Bradley Studios, Nashville, Tennessee
- Genre: Country
- Length: 2:31
- Label: Columbia 40864
- Songwriter: Marty Robbins
- Producer: Mitch Miller

Marty Robbins singles chronology
"Knee Deep in the Blues" (1957)	"A White Sport Coat (And A Pink Carnation)" (1957)	"Please Don't Blame Me" (1957)

"A White Sport Coat (And A Pink Carnation)" is a 1957 country and western song with words and music both written by Marty Robbins. It was recorded at the Bradley Studios in Nashville, Tennessee, on January 25, 1957, and released on the Columbia Records label on March 4. The arranger and recording session conductor was Ray Conniff, an in-house conductor/arranger at Columbia. Robbins had demanded to have Conniff oversee the recording after his earlier hit, "Singing the Blues", had been quickly eclipsed on the charts by Guy Mitchell's cover version, which was scored and conducted by Conniff in October 1956.

The song reached number one on the US country chart, becoming Marty Robbins' third number-one record. It reached number two on the Billboard pop chart, and No. 1 in the Australian music charts. In Canada it was ranked number seven for two weeks on the first two CHUM Charts. Billboard ranked it as the number 17 song for 1957.

== Background ==
Robbins recalled writing "A White Sport Coat" in about 20 minutes, while being transported in a standard automobile. He is said to have had the inspiration for the song while driving from a motel to a venue in Ohio, where he was due to perform that evening. During the course of the journey, he passed a local high school, where its students were dressed ready for their prom.

In the song, the narrator was hoping to go to the prom with a certain girl, wearing a white sport coat and a pink carnation. The girl decided to go to the prom with another guy, though, putting the narrator in a blue mood.

== Cover versions ==
- A version by Johnny Desmond received some play also, peaking at number 62 on the U.S. pop charts.
- In the UK, the song was a notable hit for English rock and roll singer Terry Dene, which reached number 18 in the UK singles chart. A recording by the King Brothers peaked at number six; both versions were hits in early summer 1957.

== In popular culture ==
- The song is mentioned in Don McLean's song "American Pie" (1971), with just the lyric about the "pink carnation".
- Jimmy Buffett's 1973 album A White Sport Coat and a Pink Crustacean spoofs the title of the song.
- The song is featured in the opening credits of the 1997 film Going All the Way.
- The song can be heard during the bowling-alley scene in Martin Scorsese's 2019 film The Irishman.
- Paul McCartney famously dressed in a white sport coat in homage to the song on July 6, 1957, the day of the Woolton Village Fete, when he was introduced to John Lennon.
