= Four Walls (Jim Reeves song) =

Single by Jim Reeves

from the album The Best of Jim Reeves
- B-side: "I Know and You Know"
- Released: 1957
- Recorded: 1956
- Studio: RCA Victor (Nashville, Tennessee)
- Genre: Country
- Length: 2:46
- Label: RCA Victor
- Songwriters: Marvin Moore; George Campbell
- Producer: Chet Atkins

Jim Reeves singles chronology
"Young Hearts" (1957)	"Four Walls" (1957)	"I Love You More" (1958)

"Four Walls" is a country song written in 1951 by Marvin J. Moore (lyrics) and George H. Campbell, Jr. (music). Moore also wrote the lyrics for the hit song "Green Door".

== Jim Reeves version ==
Jim Reeves had noticed the song in the office of RCA Victor record producer Chet Atkins and asked to record it. Atkins felt that the song was more suitable for a female singer, but Reeves persisted and eventually a recording was made on February 7, 1957. Many of the singer's previous records had been made in a forceful style, but Reeves employed a more mellow delivery, standing closer to the microphone for "Four Walls". Accompanied by Bob Moore on bass, Chet Atkins on guitar, Farris Coursey on drums, Floyd Cramer on piano, with vocal backing by The Jordanaires, the song went to number 1 in 1957 on the Country music chart and number 12 on the Pop chart. In Canada, the song reached number 12 on the CHUM Charts, co-charting with the Jim Lowe version.

== Other recordings ==
- 1957 Jim Lowe — reached No. 15 in the Billboard charts in 1957.
- 1957 Michael Holliday
- 1962 Kay Starr for her album Just Plain Country.
- 1962 Patti Page for her album Go on Home and 1968 for her album Gentle on My Mind.
- 1962 Johnny Tillotson for his album It Keeps Right On a-Hurtin'.
- 1965 Bing Crosby for his album Bing Crosby Sings the Great Country Hits.
- 1967 Connie Francis for her album My Heart Cries for You.
- 1968 B. J. Thomas for his album On My Way.
- 1969 Jerry Lee Lewis for his album Sings the Country Music Hall of Fame Hits, Vol. 1 .
- 1969 Dillard and Clark for their album Through the Morning, Through the Night.
- 1977 Vera Lynn for her album Vera Lynn in Nashville.
- 1981 Ronnie Milsap recorded a version for a tribute album to Jim Reeves, featuring ten songs previously made hits by Reeves both before and after his death. Milsap’s album title was derived from the opening line of "Four Walls," "Out where the bright lights are glowing."
- 1995 Willie Nelson for his album Just One Love.
