= Bye Bye Love (The Everly Brothers song) =

Single by the Everly Brothers

from the album The Everly Brothers
- B-side: "I Wonder If I Care as Much"
- Released: March 1957
- Recorded: March 1, 1957
- Studio: RCA Victor (Nashville)
- Genre: Rockabilly; country; rock and roll
- Length: 2:26
- Label: Cadence
- Songwriters: Felice & Boudleaux Bryant

The Everly Brothers singles chronology
"Keep A-Lovin' Me" (1956)	"Bye Bye Love" (1957)	"Wake Up Little Susie" (1957)

"Bye Bye Love" is a popular song written by Felice and Boudleaux Bryant and published in 1957. It is best known in a debut recording by the Everly Brothers, issued by Cadence Records as catalog number 1315. The song reached No. 2 on the US Billboard Pop charts and No. 1 on the Cash Box Best Selling Record charts. The Everly Brothers' version also enjoyed major success as a country song, reaching No. 1 in the spring of 1957. The Everlys' "Bye Bye Love" is ranked 210th on Rolling Stone magazine's list of "The 500 Greatest Songs of All Time".

In 1998, The Everly Brothers version of "Bye Bye Love" was inducted into the Grammy Hall of Fame.

George Harrison reinterpreted it for his 1974 album Dark Horse, changing the words to reference his wife Pattie Boyd leaving him for his friend Eric Clapton. "Bye Bye Love" has also been covered by Simon & Garfunkel.

The song had been rejected by 30 other acts before it was recorded by the Everlys. The guitar intro was not originally part of the song, but was something that Don Everly had come up with and was tacked onto the beginning. Chet Atkins was the lead guitar player on the session. Floyd Chance was the upright bassist and Buddy Harman was the drummer.

== Simon & Garfunkel version ==
Simon & Garfunkel included a live version of the song on their 1970 album Bridge over Troubled Water. Following the end of filming of Catch-22 in October, the first performance of their tour took place in Ames, Iowa. The concert included "Bye Bye Love", backed by the audience's hand clapping. Simon & Garfunkel were fascinated with its sound, so they repeated it a second time for a recording; while the first try failed, they liked the second attempt and included it on Bridge over Troubled Water.

"Bye Bye Love" became a farewell song and a sign of a new career. Peter Ames Carlin praised their version for its "close harmony pleasures".

== George Harrison version ==
In 1974, George Harrison recorded "Bye Bye, Love" for his album Dark Horse. As well as inserting a comma in the song title, Harrison wrote additional lyrics and a radically different melody line. Author Chris Ingham describes Harrison's version as "recomposed in a minor key and featuring pointedly customised lyrics". The new words were in reference to his wife Pattie Boyd having left him for their mutual friend Eric Clapton:

There goes our lady, with a-you-know-who
I hope she's happy, old Clapper too
We had good rhythm (and a little slide) till she stepped in
Did me a favour, I ... threw them both out.

In a later verse, Harrison states that he has "got tired of ladies that plot and shove me", before apparently dismissing his wife's affair as "our lady ... out on a spree".

Rumours circulated that Clapton himself contributed on guitar and Boyd on backing vocals, but they were false, even though the new couple were credited on the inner sleeve notes next to the song title. Harrison had written their names along with other cryptic messages among the album's musician credits, whereupon an assistant then sought permission from Clapton's record company and added the standard acknowledgment, reading: "Eric Clapton appears through the courtesy of RSO Records."

The song also included a credit for "Rhythm Ace", which Tom Scott explained soon after the album's release: "Rhythm Ace is an electronic machine that plays any rhythm – a boogaloo, a cha-cha or a rhumba. I suppose a lot of people will think it's a person." In fact, Harrison played all the instruments on the recording, using the multitrack facilities at his Friar Park home studio: two 12-string acoustic guitars, drums, Moog bass as well as bass guitar, three electric guitar parts, electric piano, bongos, together with his lead vocal and backing vocals.

While Harrison dismissed the exercise as "just a little joke" in a 1977 interview, his rendition of "Bye Bye Love" drew an unfavorable response from music critics when Dark Horse was released in December 1974. In music journalist Peter Doggett's description, "gossip columnists lapped up" the information Harrison disclosed in the song. Among more recent assessments, Richard Ginell of AllMusic calls it a "slipshod rewrite" and Alan Clayson refers to Harrison's "blatant ... liberty-taking". Author Simon Leng views it as "one track on Dark Horse that seriously fails the quality-control test ... a desperately bad offering". He adds: "In its own way, 'Bye Bye, Love' is a classic 1970s period piece, from the era when rock stars used music to settle their own personal scores. Thankfully, George Harrison only made that mistake once."

In a 2014 review for Uncut, Richard Williams described Harrison's rendition of "Bye Bye, Love" as a highlight of an album that otherwise "only a devoted Apple scruff could love". With this cover version, Williams continued, Harrison "sought the kind of return to bare-bones rock'n'roll simplicity Lennon had achieved with 'Instant Karma'". Ingham also rates "Bye Bye, Love" among the best tracks on Dark Horse, along with the title song and "Far East Man". Blogcritics' Chaz Lipp describes it as "a funky and funny comment on the dissolution of his marriage".

== Personnel ==
The following musicians played on the Everly Brothers' recording:

- Don Everly – lead vocals and acoustic guitar
- Phil Everly – lead vocals and acoustic guitar
- Chet Atkins – electric guitar
- Floyd “Lightnin’” Chance – double bass
- Buddy Harman – drums

== Charts & certifications ==
Charts (1957)	Peak position
Australia (Kent Music Report)	14
Belgium (Ultratop 50 Flanders)	11
Belgium (Ultratop 50 Wallonia)	15
Canada (CHUM Chart)	2
Dutch Single Top 100	4
New Zealand (NZ Lever Hit Parade)	1
UK Singles Chart	6
UK (NME)	6
US Billboard Hot 100	2
US Cash Box Top 100 Singles	1
US Hot Country Songs (Billboard)	1
US Hot R&B Songs (Billboard)	5
US Record World Chart	1

Region	Certification
United States (RIAA)	Gold

== Other cover versions ==
The Everly Brothers' country success was concurrent with another country version, recorded by Webb Pierce, at the time one of country music's top entertainers. Pierce's version reached No. 7 on Billboard's chart of Most Played C&W by Jockeys, while reaching No. 8 on Billboard's chart of C&W Best Selling in Stores, in a tandem ranking with its B-side, "Missing You".

Roy Orbison covered the song on his 1961 album Lonely and Blue.

Ray Charles covered the song on his 1962 album Modern Sounds in Country and Western Music, and also performed the song live, including in a television appearance with Glen Campbell.

The Beatles covered the song during the Let It Be sessions in 1969.

An altered version, titled "Bye Bye Life", sung by Ben Vereen and Roy Scheider, serves as the finale to the 1979 film All That Jazz.

Lacy J. Dalton covered the song on her 1992 album Chains on the Wind. Her version peaked at number 69 on the RPM Country Tracks chart in Canada.

A parody of the song was used in a commercial for Sea-Bond denture adhesive in the late 2000s. Within the music industry, the use of the song in that matter was a cautionary tale for how allowing a song to be used in advertising can go wrong; songwriter and producer Bob Gaudio recalled the advertisement when discussing the tight rein he held over his catalog with the Four Seasons Partnership: "Even now I have to turn it off if it shows up on YouTube. It's just terrible."
