= Gone (Ferlin Husky song) =

Single by Ferlin Husky

from the album Gone
- B-side: "Missing Persons"
- Released: January 1957
- Recorded: November 7, 1956
- Studio: Bradley Studios, Nashville, Tennessee
- Genre: Country
- Length: 2:21
- Label: Capitol
- Songwriter: Smokey Rogers

Ferlin Husky singles chronology
"I'll Baby Sit with You" (1955)	"Gone" (1957)	"A Fallen Star" (1957)

"Gone" is a 1957 single by Ferlin Husky written by Smokey Rogers. The song was Ferlin Husky's second No. 1 on the country chart, where it stayed at the top for ten weeks with a total of 27 weeks on the charts. The vocal backing on the song was provided by the Jordanaires with soprano Millie Kirkham. "Gone" also crossed over to the Hot 100, peaking at No. 4. Selling over one million copies, "Gone" was awarded a gold disc.

Recorded in Nashville at Bradley Studios, the recording is widely regarded as the first example of the Nashville Sound production approach. The use of echo and sparse instrumental support combined with the talented background singers heightened the drama of Husky's distinctive vocal.

Prior to recording this hit, Husky appeared regularly at the Grand Ole Opry. "Gone" propelled him to network television appearances first on Arthur Godfrey's Talent Scouts then a spot as guest host on the Kraft Television Theater, The Ed Sullivan Show, and eventually talk shows hosted by Steve Allen, Johnny Carson, and Merv Griffin. Husky had to give up his Opry slot, but TV exposure introduced him to millions of viewers.

Husky had previously recorded "Gone" for an earlier release on Capitol as Terry Preston.

== Cover versions ==
- Buddy Holly recorded the song prior to his death in 1959. His versioin of the song was released posthumously in 1964.
- In 1966, Connie Smith covered the song on her album Born to Sing.
- In 1972, Joey Heatherton peaked at #24 on the US Hot 100 and #25 in Canada with her version of the song. It also peaked at number 38 in Australia.
- In 1980, Ronnie McDowell hit the Top 40 on the country charts with his version of the song.
- The Fleetwoods released a cover version of the song which can be found on their 1993 greatest hits album, Come Softly to Me: The Very Best of the Fleetwoods.
