= Fraulein (song) =

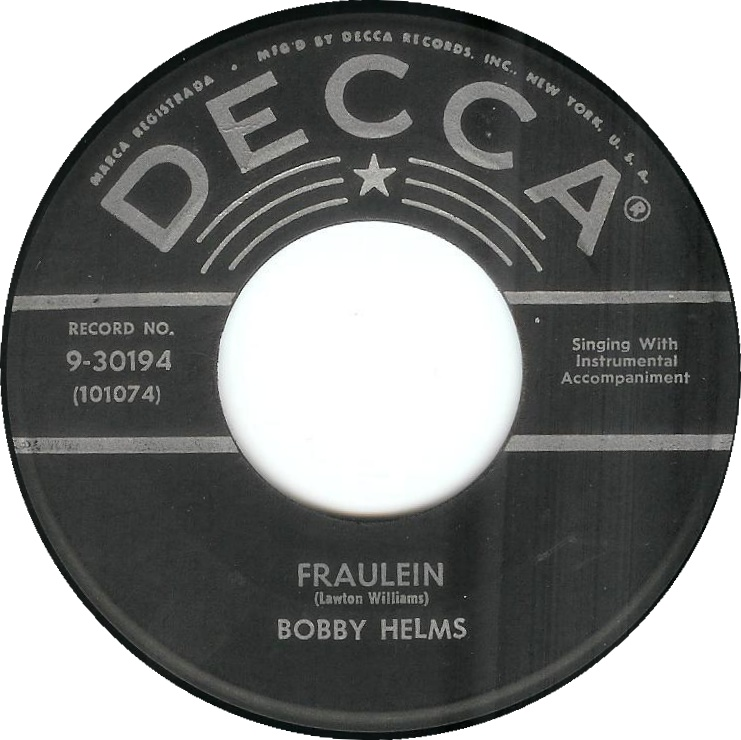

Single by Bobby Helms
- A-side: "(Got A) Heartsick Feeling"
- Released: January 28, 1957
- Recorded: 1956
- Genre: Country
- Label: Decca
- Songwriter: Lawton Williams

Bobby Helms singles chronology
"Tennessee Rock and Roll" (1956)	"Fraulein" (1957)	"My Special Angel" (1957)

Audio
- "Fraulein" on YouTube

"Fraulein" is a 1957 song written by Lawton Williams and sung by Bobby Helms. Released by Decca Records that year, "Fraulein" was Helms's debut single on the U.S. country chart, reaching number one for four weeks and staying on chart for 52 weeks, the sixth-longest song in country music history to spend over 50 weeks on the country singles chart. The song's popularity crossed over to the pop chart, where "Fraulein" peaked at number 36. Country music singer and Decca labelmate Kitty Wells recorded a response to the song, "(I'll Always Be Your) Fraulein" in 1957. "(I'll Always Be Your) Fraulein" appears in her 1959 album Kitty Wells' Golden Favorites.

Helms himself recorded his own follow-up song in 1960, entitled "Lonely River Rhine". The lyrics reveal a darker side of the singer, he had had a wife all along, but "stole love" from a local girl when in Munich, only to later leave her and much later learn from the newspapers that she had committed suicide by drowning herself in the Rhine, and he learned that the deceased was the one whom he truly loved. The melody of the song is largely borrowed from "Oklahoma Hills" by Woody Guthrie, which was recorded as a hit song in 1945 by his cousin Jack Guthrie, the aforementioned of which today serves as the State song of Oklahoma.

== Charts ==
Chart (1957–1958)	Peak position
US Hot Country Songs (Billboard)	1
US Billboard Hot 100	36

== Album appearances ==
The song appears on the 1960 compilation album The Original Hit Performances! All Time Country and Western (Decca DL 4010).
