= Wake Up Little Susie =

1957 single by The Everly Brothers

Single by The Everly Brothers

from the album The Everly Brothers
- B-side: "Maybe Tomorrow"
- Released: September 2, 1957
- Recorded: August 16, 1957
- Studio: RCA Victor (Nashville)
- Genre: Rock and roll; country; rockabilly
- Length: 2:07
- Label: Cadence
- Songwriters: Felice Bryant; Boudleaux Bryant

The Everly Brothers singles chronology
| "Bye Bye Love" (1957) | "Wake Up Little Susie" (1957) | "This Little Girl of Mine" (1958) |

"Wake Up Little Susie" is a popular song written by Felice and Boudleaux Bryant and published in 1957.

The song is best known as a recording by the Everly Brothers, issued by Cadence Records as catalog number 1337. The Everly Brothers record reached No. 1 on the Billboard Pop chart and the Cash Box Best Selling Records chart, despite having been banned from Boston radio stations for lyrics that, at the time, were considered suggestive, according to a 1986 interview with Don Everly. "Wake Up Little Susie" also spent seven weeks atop the Billboard country chart and got to No. 2 on the UK Singles Chart. The song was ranked at No. 318 on the Rolling Stone magazine's list of "The 500 Greatest Songs of All Time". In 2017, the 1957 recording by the Everly Brothers was inducted into the Grammy Hall of Fame.

== Song premise ==
The song is written from the point of view of a high school boy to his girlfriend, Susie. In the song, the two go out on a date to a cinema (perhaps a drive-in), only to fall asleep during the movie. They do not wake up until 4 o'clock in the morning, well after her 10 o'clock curfew. They then contemplate the reactions of her parents and their friends. The boy fears that having stayed out so late, they've both now lost their good reputations.

== Personnel ==
- Don Everly – vocals, rhythm guitar
- Phil Everly – vocals, rhythm guitar
- Floyd “Lightnin’” Chance – double bass

== Charts ==
All versions

| Chart (1957–58) | Peak position |
|---|---|
| US Honor Roll of Hits (Billboard) | 1 |

The Everly Brothers version

| Chart (1957–58) | Peak position |
|---|---|
| Australia (Kent Music Report) | 3 |
| Canada (CHUM Chart) | 1 |
| Dutch Single Top 100 | 4 |
| New Zealand (NZ Lever Hit Parade) | 1 |
| UK | 2 |
| UK (NME) | 2 |
| US Best Sellers in Stores (Billboard) | 1 |
| US C&W Best Sellers in Stores (Billboard) | 1 |
| US Most Played by Jockeys (Billboard) | 1 |
| US Most Played C&W by Jockeys (Billboard) | 1 |
| US Most Played R&B by Jockeys (Billboard) | 1 |
| US R&B Best Sellers in Stores (Billboard) | 1 |
| US Cash Box Top 100 Singles | 1 |
| US Record World Chart | 1 |

Simon & Garfunkel version

| Chart (1982) | Peak position |
|---|---|
| Canada Adult Contemporary (RPM) | 5 |
| US Billboard Hot 100 | 27 |
| US Adult Contemporary (Billboard) | 5 |

== Simon & Garfunkel version ==
"Wake Up Little Susie"

Single by Simon & Garfunkel

from the album The Concert in Central Park
- B-side: "Me and Julio Down by the Schoolyard"
- Released: 1982
- Recorded: September 19, 1981
- Venue: Great Lawn, Central Park, New York City
- Genre: Rock and roll; country; rockabilly
- Length: 2:20
- Songwriters: Felice Bryant; Boudleaux Bryant

Simon & Garfunkel singles chronology
| "My Little Town" (1975) | "Wake Up Little Susie" (1982) |

Simon & Garfunkel have cited the Everly Brothers as strong influences on their own music. Their live version of "Wake Up Little Susie", recorded at the duo's concert in New York's Central Park on September 19, 1981, reached #27 on the Billboard Hot 100 in 1982, and is the duo's last Top 40 hit.

During Simon & Garfunkel's "Old Friends" tour in 2003–2004, they performed this song and others in a segment with the Everly Brothers, who toured in support.

== See also ==
- Banned in Boston
- List of Billboard number-one rhythm and blues hits
- List of Billboard number-one singles of 1957
- Billboard year-end top 50 singles of 1957
- List of Cash Box Best Sellers number-one singles of 1957
- List of CHUM number-one singles of 1957
- List of number-one country singles of 1957 (U.S.)
