= Bobby Helms =

American country singer (1933–1997)

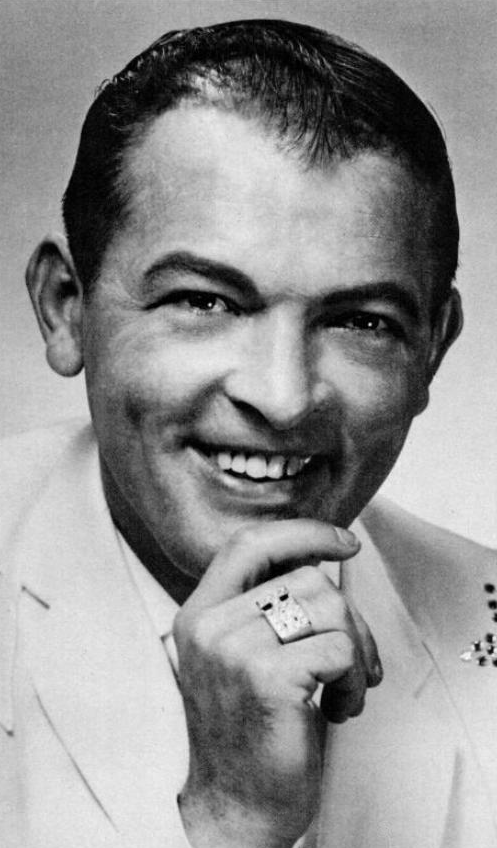
- Helms in 1968

Background information
- Born: Robert Lee Helms; August 15, 1933; Helmsburg, Indiana, U.S.
- Died: June 19, 1997 (aged 63) Martinsville, Indiana, U.S.
- Genres: Country; pop; rock and roll; rockabilly
- Occupations: Singer; musician
- Instruments: Vocals; guitar
- Years active: 1942–1997
- Labels: Decca; Columbia; Vocalion

Robert Lee Helms (August 15, 1933 – June 19, 1997) was an American country singer and musician. In 1957, he had a perennial Christmas hit with "Jingle Bell Rock", and two other hits that same year: "Fraulein" and "My Special Angel".

== Biography ==
=== Early life and family ===
Robert Lee Helms was born on August 15, 1933, in Helmsburg, Indiana, a small community outside Bloomington named for his family, the son of Hildreth Esther (née Abram) and Fred Robert Helms. His family was musical. Helms began performing as a duo with his brother, Freddie, before going on to a successful solo career in country music.

Helms was married thrice and was the father of eight children. His first two marriages ended in divorce, while he married his third wife in April 1997, two months before his death.

=== Solo career ===
In 1956, Helms made his way to Nashville, Tennessee, where he signed a recording contract with Decca Records, and achieved multiple successes the following year. His first single in 1957, titled "Fraulein", went to number one on the country music chart and made it into the top 40 on the Billboard Best Sellers in Stores chart. Later that same year, he released "My Special Angel", which also hit number one on the country charts and entered the top 10 on Billboard's pop music chart, peaking at number seven. It sold over one million copies, earning a gold disc.

Helms' song "Jingle Bell Rock", which was released in the late fall of 1957, was produced by Paul Cohen and became a big hit. The song was being played and danced to on Dick Clark's teen dance show American Bandstand by mid-December of that year. It also re-emerged in four out of the next five years, and sold so well that it repeated each time as a top hit, becoming a Christmas classic still played today. (In 2016, it was rated radio's third-most-played Christmas song, according to StationIntel). The song took five years for the song to become a second million-seller for Helms. It reached number six on the Billboard Hot 100 and spent 21 weeks on the chart. The record gained gold disc status. At the end of a television performance of the song toward the end of his life, Helms said, "I didn't want to do the song when they first brought it to me, but now I'm sure glad I did." ASCAP and AllMusic list the writers of the song as Joseph Beal, Joseph Carlton, James Ross, and James Boothe.

Another record by Helms was "Schoolboy Crush", which was a hit in the UK. It was released in the United States on June 23, 1958, on Decca. The same song was then covered by UK teen star Cliff Richard about the same time as the UK release.

Helms continued touring and recording for the next three decades. His pioneering contributions to the genre have been recognized by the Rockabilly Hall of Fame.

Helms was portrayed by Brad Hawkins in the 2007 film Crazy.

=== Health and death ===
Helms suffered from emphysema, asthma, diabetes, and stomach problems. He began wearing an eye patch after losing sight in his right eye. Helms was a longtime resident of Martinsville, Indiana, until his death from complications from emphysema at age 63 on June 19, 1997.

== Discography ==
=== Selected albums ===
- Sings to My Special Angel (Decca, 1957)
- I'm the Man (Kapp, 1966)
- Sorry My Name Isn't Fred (Kapp, 1966)
- All New Just for You (Little Darlin', 1968)
- Pop-a-Billy (MCA, 1983)
- A Bobby Helms Christmas [EP] (Geffen, 2024)

=== Singles ===
List of singles, with selected chart positions
Year	Single	Peak chart positions				Album
Year	Single	US Country	US	US AC	UK	Album
1955	"Yesterday's Lovin'"	—	—	—	—	non-album track
1955	"Freedom Lovin' Guy"	—	—	—	—	non-album track
1956	"Tennessee Rock and Roll"	—	—	—	—	non-album track
1957	"Fraulein"	1	36	—	—	non-album track
1957	"My Special Angel"	1	7	—	22	My Special Angel
1957	"Jingle Bell Rock"	13	6	—	5	single only
1958	"Just a Little Lonesome"	10	—	—	—	My Special Angel
1958	"Jacqueline"	5	63	—	20	non-album track
1958	"Borrowed Dreams"	—	60	—	—	non-album track
1958	"Jingle Bell Rock"	—	6	—	—	non-album track
1958	"The Fool and the Angel"	—	75	—	—	non-album track
1959	"New River Train"	26	—	—	—	non-album track
1959	"I Guess I'll Miss the Prom"	—	—	—	—	non-album track
1959	"No Other Baby"	—	—	—	30	non-album track
1959	"Hurry Baby"	—	—	—	—	non-album track
1960	"Someone Was Already There"	—	—	—	—	non-album track
1960	"I Want to Be with You"	—	—	—	—	non-album track
1960	"Lonely River Rhine"	16	—	—	—	non-album track
1960	"Jingle Bell Rock" (re-entry)	—	36	—	—	non-album track
1961	"Sad Eyed Baby"	—	—	—	—	non-album track
1961	"How Can You Divide a Little Child"	—	—	—	—	non-album track
1961	"Jingle Bell Rock" (re-entry)	—	41	—	—	non-album track
1962	"One Deep Love"	—	—	—	—	non-album track
1962	"Then Came You"	—	—	—	—	non-album track
1962	"Jingle Bell Rock" (re-entry)	—	56	—	—	non-album track
1964	"It's a Girl"	—	—	—	—	non-album track
1967	"He Thought He'd Die Laughing"	46	—	—	—	All New Just for You
1968	"The Day You Stop Loving Me"	60	—	—	—	All New Just for You
1968	"I Feel You, I Love You"	53	—	—	—	single only
1968	"Touch My Heart"	—	—	—	—	All New Just for You
1969	"My Special Angel"	—	—	—	—	Before Your Heartaches Begin
1969	"So Long"	43	—	—	—	Before Your Heartaches Begin
1969	"Echoes and Shadows"	—	—	—	—	Before Your Heartaches Begin
1970	"Mary Goes 'Round"	41	—	—	—	Greatest Performance
1970	"Magnificent Sanctuary Band"	—	—	—	—	non-album track
1970	"Just Hold My Hand and Sing"	—	—	—	—	non-album track
1971	"He Gives Us His Love"	—	—	—	—	non-album track
1971	"Hand in Hand with Love"	—	—	—	—	non-album track
1972	"It's the Little Things"	—	—	—	—	non-album track
1972	"It's Starting to Rain Again"	—	—	—	—	non-album track
1974	"That Heart Belongs to Me"	—	—	—	—	non-album track
1974	"Work Things Out with Annie"	—	—	—	—	non-album track
1975	"Baby If I Could Make It Better"	—	—	—	—	non-album track
1976	"Every Man Must Have a Dream"	—	—	—	—	non-album track
1976	"You"	—	—	—	—	non-album track
1977	"Before My Heartaches Came"	—	—	—	—	non-album track
1978	"I'm Gonna Love the Devil Out of You"	—	—	—	—	non-album track
1978	"I'm Not Sorry"	—	—	—	—	non-album track
1979	"One More Dollar for the Band"	—	—	—	—	non-album track
1983	"Tears Ago"	—	—	—	—	non-album track
1983	"I'm Drinking It Over (With My Friend Jim Beam)"	—	—	—	—	non-album track
1985	"I Wish I Could Say I Find"	—	—	—	—	non-album track
1986	"I'm the Man"	—	—	—	—	non-album track
1987	"Dance with Me"	—	—	—	—	non-album track
1987	"Somebody Wrong Is Lookin' Right"	—	—	—	—	non-album track
1996	"Jingle Bell Rock" (re-release)	60	—	18	—	Jingle All the Way (soundtrack)
2015	"Jingle Bell Rock" (re-entry)	—	47	—	—	digital single
2016	"Jingle Bell Rock" (re-entry)	—	29	—	71	digital single
2017	"Jingle Bell Rock" (re-entry)	—	50	—	63	digital single
2018	"Jingle Bell Rock" (re-entry)	—	8	—	41	digital single
2019	"Jingle Bell Rock" (re-entry)	—	3	—	30	digital single
2020	"Jingle Bell Rock" (re-entry)	—	3	—	27	digital single
2021	"Jingle Bell Rock" (re-entry)	—	3	—	16	digital single
2022	"Jingle Bell Rock" (re-entry)	—	3	—	7	digital single
2023	"Jingle Bell Rock" (re-entry)	—	3	—	9	digital single
2024	"Jingle Bell Rock" (re-entry)	—	3	—	5	digital single
2025	"Jingle Bell Rock" (re-entry)	—	2	—	8	digital single
2026	"Jingle Bell Rock" (re-entry)	—	—	—	48	digital single

== See also ==
- Billboard Hot 100 chart achievements and milestones
