= 1957 in music =

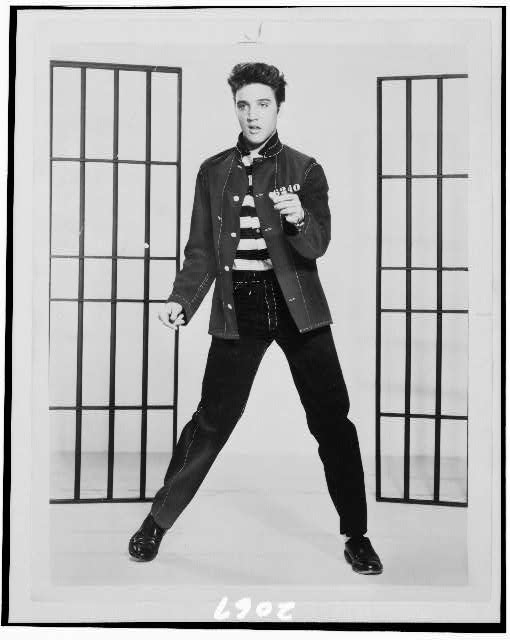
Elvis Presley in 1957 film "Jailhouse Rock".

This is a list of notable events in music that took place in the year 1957.

== Specific locations ==
- 1957 in British music
- 1957 in Norwegian music

== Specific genres ==
- 1957 in country music
- 1957 in jazz

== Events ==
- January 5 – Renato Carosone and his band start their American tour in Cuba.
- January 6 – Elvis Presley makes his final appearance on The Ed Sullivan Show.
- January 16 – The Cavern Club opens in Liverpool, England, as a jazz club.
- February 8 – Bo Diddley records his songs "Hey! Bo Diddley" and "Mona (I Need You Baby)".
- February 16 – BBC Television in the UK begins presenting the Saturday-night show Six-Five Special which pioneers the presentation of rock and roll on television.
- March – Chicago's Cardinal Stritch bans all rock and roll and rhythm and blues music from Catholic-run schools, saying that "its rhythms encourage young people to behave in a hedonistic manner."
- March 1 – The Everly Brothers record in Nashville their first single "Bye Bye Love" for Cadence Records.
- March 3 – The second annual Eurovision Song Contest is staged in Frankfurt am Main, West Germany. The contest is won by Dutch singer Corry Brokken with the song Net als toen.
- March 19 – Elvis Presley purchases a mansion in Memphis, Tennessee, and calls it Graceland.
- March 26 – Ricky Nelson records his first three songs.
- March 27 – "Que Sera, Sera (Whatever Will Be, Will Be)" from 1956's Alfred Hitchcock suspense film The Man Who Knew Too Much wins the Academy Award for Best Song. Sung by Doris Day in the film, it proves to be one of her biggest hit records as well.
- May 14 – In Paris, Heitor Villa-Lobos records his Bachiana Brasileira No. 4, with the Orchestre Nationale de la Radiodiffusion Française, for EMI. Through May 21 the recording sessions continue with Bachiana Brasileira No. 7 and Bachiana Brasileira No. 3 with Manoel Braune, piano.
- May 26 – Paul Robeson, blacklisted at this time from travelling outside the United States, performs a concert from New York City via the new transatlantic telephone line to an audience in St Pancras Town Hall in London; on October 5 he uses the same means to address the Miners' Eisteddfod at the Grand Pavilion, Porthcawl in Wales.
- June 20 – Tōru Takemitsu's Requiem for Strings is first performed, by the Tokyo Symphony Orchestra.
- July 6 – John Lennon and Paul McCartney of The Beatles first meet at a garden fete at St. Peter's Church, Woolton, Liverpool, England, at which Lennon's skiffle group, The Quarrymen, is playing (and in the graveyard of which an Eleanor Rigby is buried).
- August 5 – American Bandstand begins its 30-year syndicated run on US network television.
- August 7 – The Quarrymen first play at The Cavern Club in Liverpool in an interlude spot between jazz bands; when John Lennon starts the group playing Elvis Presley's "Don't Be Cruel", the club's owner at this time hands him a note reading "Cut out the bloody rock 'n roll". Paul McCartney is away from Liverpool at this time at a Boy Scout camp and a family holiday.
- September 19 – Dalida is the first artist to be awarded a gold record in France for 300,000 sales of "Bambino". This year, she is also the first female recording artist to have her own fan club.
- September 20 – Jean Sibelius dies aged 91 at Ainola, his home in Finland, having completed no significant compositions for thirty years; at the time of his death, a performance of his Symphony No. 5 is being given in Helsinki under the baton of Sir Malcolm Sargent.
- September 26 – Broadway première of the musical West Side Story at the Winter Garden Theatre (following tryouts in Washington, D.C., and Philadelphia beginning in August) with music by Leonard Bernstein (who a week later is appointed music director of the New York Philharmonic orchestra) and lyrics by Stephen Sondheim, his Broadway debut. This year also Bernstein conducts the inaugural concert of the Mann Auditorium in Tel Aviv.
- September 29 – Jean Sibelius lies in state overnight, following a short memorial service at which musicians from the Helsinki Philharmonic Orchestra and Radio Symphony Orchestra carry his coffin into Helsinki Cathedral while Tapani Valsta plays the organ.
- September 30 – The state funeral of Jean Sibelius is held at Helsinki Cathedral. MAino Sibelius and Finland's president, Urho Kekkonen, lay wreaths, and composers Uuno Klami and Einojuhani Rautavaara are among the coffin-bearers. The coffin is taken to his home at Ainola for burial.
- November 25–27 – The first two Hollywood motion pictures starring Pat Boone, Bernadine and April Love, are released.
- Paul Simon and Art Garfunkel name themselves Tom and Jerry and begin their recording career, signing with Sid Prosen of Big Records. Their first single, "Hey, Schoolgirl", backed with "Dancin' Wild", hits #49 on the Billboard pop charts. Garfunkel is Tom Graph (so called because he like to write the pop charts out on graph paper) and Simon is Jerry Landis, a pseudonym he used during his early 1960s solo recordings. They tour for eighteen months before retiring to become college students and then reforming in 1963 as Simon & Garfunkel.
- The Casals Festival is founded in Puerto Rico.
- When Nat King Cole's television show is unable to get a sponsor, Frankie Laine becomes the first artist to cross TV's color line, becoming the first white artist to appear as a guest, foregoing his usual salary of $10,000. Other top performers follow suit, including Mel Tormé and Tony Bennett, but, despite an increase in ratings, the show still fails to pick up a national sponsor.
- Gorni Kramer makes his first appearance on Italian television, in Il Musichiere.
- Maria Callas is introduced to Greek shipping magnate Aristotle Onassis.
- "Suíte do Pescador" is composed by Dorival Caymmi.
- Actress Debbie Reynolds earns a gold record for her song Tammy, which is the best-selling single by a female vocalist in 1957 in the United States. This song from the motion picture Tammy and the Bachelor is also nominated for an Academy Award.

== Bands formed ==
- United States Navy Steel Band

== Albums released ==
- About the Blues – Julie London
- After Glow – Carmen McRae
- After Midnight – Nat King Cole
- After School Session – Chuck Berry
- Almendra – Aldemaro Romero
- Anita Sings the Most – Anita O'Day
- April in Paris – Count Basie
- Art Pepper Meets the Rhythm Section – Art Pepper
- At Mister Kelly's – Sarah Vaughan
- At the Gate of Horn – Odetta
- Award Winner: Stan Getz – Stan Getz
- Bags' Groove – Miles Davis
- The Beat of My Heart – Tony Bennett
- Belafonte Sings of the Caribbean – Harry Belafonte
- Bing with a Beat – Bing Crosby
- The Big Beat – Johnnie Ray
- Birth of the Cool – Miles Davis
- Blossom Dearie – Blossom Dearie
- A Blowin' Session – Johnny Griffin
- Blue Starr – Kay Starr
- Blue Train – John Coltrane
- Blue Trombone – J. J. Johnson
- Boy Meets Girl – Sammy Davis Jr. and Carmen McRae
- Brilliant Corners – Thelonious Monk
- Chet Atkins at Home – Chet Atkins
- The "Chirping" Crickets – Buddy Holly & The Crickets (debut)
- A Christmas Story – Bing Crosby
- Close to You – Frank Sinatra
- A Closer Walk with Thee – Pat Boone
- The Clown – Charles Mingus
- Coltrane – John Coltrane
- Cookin' – Paul Gonsalves
- Cookin' with the Miles Davis Quintet – Miles Davis
- Count Basie at Newport – Count Basie
- Criollísima – Aldemaro Romero
- Cuban Jam Sessions in Miniature – Cachao
- Day by Night – Doris Day
- Dedicated to You – The "5" Royales
- Double Play! – Russ Freeman & André Previn
- Dream Street – Peggy Lee
- Drum Suite – Art Blakey
- Ella and Louis Again – Ella Fitzgerald & Louis Armstrong
- Ella Fitzgerald Sings the Duke Ellington Song Book – Ella Fitzgerald & Duke Ellington
- Elvis' Christmas Album – Elvis Presley
- An Evening with Belafonte – Harry Belafonte
- Exotica – Martin Denny
- Gene Vincent and His Blue Caps – Gene Vincent
- Grand Ole Opry's New Star – George Jones
- The Great Ray Charles – Ray Charles
- Hard Bop – Art Blakely and the Jazz Messengers
- The Helen Morgan Story – Gogi Grant
- Her Nibs – Georgia Gibbs
- Here's Little Richard – Little Richard
- Hi-Fi in Focus – Chet Atkins
- Hymns We Love – Pat Boone
- I Love John Frigo...He Swings – Johnny Frigo (debut)
- In Las Vegas – Johnnie Ray
- Interplay for 2 Trumpets and 2 Tenors – John Coltrane
- It's All Over but the Swingin' – Sammy Davis Jr.
- Jackie's Pal – Jackie McLean
- Jazz by Sun Ra – Sun Ra
- Jim Edward, Maxine, and Bonnie Brown – The Browns (debut)
- A Jolly Christmas from Frank Sinatra – Frank Sinatra
- The Jones Boys – Thad Jones
- Julie – Julie London
- Just One of Those Things – Nat King Cole
- Jutta Hipp With Zoot Sims – Jutta Hipp
- Like Someone in Love – Ella Fitzgerald
- Losers, Weepers – Kay Starr
- Louis and the Angels – Louis Armstrong
- Louis Armstrong Meets Oscar Peterson – Louis Armstrong & Oscar Peterson
- Love Is the Thing – Nat King Cole
- Love Serenade – Ames Brothers
- Loving You (OST) – Elvis Presley
- Mad Thad – Thad Jones
- Make Love to Me – Julie London
- Mal/2 – Mal Waldron
- The Man I Love – Peggy Lee
- The Many Sides of Toshiko – Toshiko Akiyoshi
- Mating Call – Tadd Dameron
- Mel Tormé's California Suite – Mel Tormé
- Mel Tormé at the Crescendo – Mel Tormé
- Miguel – Dalida
- Miles Ahead – Miles Davis
- A Midnight Session with the Jazz Messengers – Art Blakey
- Moanin' the Blues – Hank Williams
- Monk's Music – Thelonious Monk
- Moondreams – Dick Haymes
- Mozart: Clarinet Concerto, Quintet for Clarinet and Strings – Benny Goodman, clarinet, Boston Symphony Orchestra, conducted by Charles Munch; Boston Symphony String Quartet. 12-inch LP. RCA Victor LM 2073.
- New Tricks – Bing Crosby
- Now Hear This – The Hi-Lo's
- Once Over Lightly – Jo Stafford
- One Dozen Roses – The Mills Brothers
- One O'Clock Jump – Count Basie Orchestra, Ella Fitzgerald & Joe Williams
- Orgy in Rhythm – Art Blakey
- The Pajama Game – Doris Day
- Pal Joey – Morris Stoloff, Frank Sinatra, Kim Novak, Rita Hayworth, Trudy Erwin
- Pat – Pat Boone
- Pat Boone Sings Irving Berlin – Pat Boone
- Patsy Cline – Patsy Cline
- Please, Please, Please – James Brown
- The Poll Winners – Barney Kessel
- Porgy and Bess – Ella Fitzgerald & Louis Armstrong
- The Prestige Jazz Quartet – Teddy Charles
- Pretty Baby – Dean Martin
- Quand on n'a que l'amour – Jacques Brel
- Ray Charles – Ray Charles
- Ricky – Ricky Nelson (debut)
- Ring around Rosie – The Hi-Lo's
- Rockin' – Frankie Laine
- Rockin' the Oldies – Bill Haley & His Comets
- 'Round About Midnight – Miles Davis
- Sammy Swings – Sammy Davis Jr.
- Saxophone Colossus – Sonny Rollins
- Sea Shells – Peggy Lee
- Sing a Song of Basie – Lambert, Hendricks & Ross
- Sometimes I'm Happy, Sometimes I'm Blue – Jill Corey
- Son nom est Dalida – Dalida
- Songs for Any Taste – Mel Tormé
- Songs for Inspiration & Meditation – Jo Stafford
- Songs of Scotland – Jo Stafford
- Sophisticated Swing – Cannonball Adderley
- Soulville – Ben Webster
- The Sounds of Christmas Harmony – Ames Brothers
- Strange Blues – Jackie McLean (recorded, released 1967)
- Strictly Powell – Bud Powell
- Such Sweet Thunder – Duke Ellington
- Suddenly It's The Hi-Lo's – The Hi-Lo's
- Suddenly There's Gogi Grant – Gogi Grant
- Sweet Seventeen – Ames Brothers
- A Swingin' Affair! – Frank Sinatra
- Swingin' Easy – Sarah Vaughan
- Tenor Conclave – Prestige All Stars
- Thelonious Monk with John Coltrane – Thelonious Monk & John Coltrane
- There'll Always Be A Christmas – Ames Brothers
- Tony – Tony Bennett
- Tormé Meets the British – Mel Tormé
- Toshiko and Leon Sash at Newport – Toshiko Akiyoshi & Leon Sash
- Trane's Blues – John Coltrane
- Walkin' – Miles Davis
- Way Out West – Sonny Rollins
- We Get Letters – Perry Como
- The Weavers at Carnegie Hall – The Weavers
- West Side Story – Original Broadway Cast
- Where Are You? – Frank Sinatra
- Winner's Circle – Oscar Pettiford
- With His Hot and Blue Guitar – Johnny Cash (debut)
- Word Jazz - Ken Nordine

== Biggest hit singles ==
The following songs achieved the highest chart positions in the charts of 1957.

#	Artist	Title	Year	Country	Chart Entries
1	Elvis Presley	Jailhouse Rock	1957	US	UK 1 – Jan 1958, US BB 1 – Oct 1957, US BB 1 of 1957, Canada 1 – Oct 1957, DDD 1 of 1957, POP 1 of 1957, Europe 2 of the 1950s, Scrobulate 2 of rockabilly, RYM 3 of 1957, Netherlands 5 – Jan 1974, France 10 – Dec 1971, US CashBox 11 of 1957, South Africa 11 of 1958, AFI 21, Global 33 (5 M sold) – 1957, Party 54 of 1999, Italy 60 of 1958, Rolling Stone 67, Acclaimed 192, Belgium 214 of all time
2	Paul Anka	Diana	1957	Canada	UK 1 – Aug 1957, US BB 1 – Jul 1957, Canada 1 – Jul 1957, Australia 1 for 8 weeks Jun 1957, Italy 2 of 1958, Poland 9 – Apr 1989, US CashBox 13 of 1957, US BB 14 of 1956, POP 14 of 1956, Europe 17 of the 1950s, RYM 17 of 1957, Global 33 (5 M sold) – 1957, DDD 36 of 1957
3	Elvis Presley	All Shook Up	1957	US	UK 1 – Jun 1957, US BB 1 – Apr 1957, Canada 1 – May 1957, RYM 5 of 1957, US CashBox 8 of 1957, DDD 11 of 1957, Scrobulate 12 of rock & roll, US BB 13 of 1957, POP 13 of 1957, Netherlands 33 – Jan 2005, Global 33 (5 M sold) – 1957, Europe 78 of the 1950s, Party 179 of 2007, Rolling Stone 352, Acclaimed 835
4	Jerry Lee Lewis	Great Balls of Fire	1957	US	UK 1 – Dec 1957, RYM 1 of 1957, US BB 2 – Dec 1957, Canada 2 – Dec 1957, DDD 5 of 1957, US BB 14 of 1958, POP 14 of 1958, South Africa 15 of 1958, Netherlands 27 – Sep 1989, Scrobulate 63 of oldies, RIAA 64, Europe 76 of the 1950s, Acclaimed 86, Rolling Stone 96, Party 242 of 1999
5	Danny & the Juniors	At the Hop	1957	US	US BB 1 – Dec 1957, Canada 1 – Dec 1957, UK 3 – Jan 1958, US BB 3 of 1958, POP 3 of 1958, South Africa 6 of 1958, US CashBox 10 of 1958, RYM 11 of 1957, DDD 21 of 1957, Europe 73 of the 1950s, RIAA 250, Acclaimed 728

== US No. 1 hit singles ==
These singles reached the top of US Billboard's charts in 1957.

First week	Number of weeks	Title	Artist
February 9, 1957	3	"Too Much"	Elvis Presley
March 2, 1957	4	"Young Love"	Tab Hunter
March 30, 1957	1	"Party Doll"	Buddy Knox
April 6, 1957	1	"Round and Round"	Perry Como
April 13, 1957	8	"All Shook Up"	Elvis Presley
June 3, 1957	5	"Love Letters in the Sand"	Pat Boone
June 10, 1957	1	"Bernardine"	Pat Boone
July 8, 1957	7	"Teddy Bear"	Elvis Presley
August 26, 1957	2	"Tammy"	Debbie Reynolds
September 9, 1957	1	"Diana"	Paul Anka
September 16, 1957	1	"Tammy"	Debbie Reynolds
September 23, 1957	1	"That'll Be the Day"	The Crickets
September 30, 1957	2	"Honeycomb"	Jimmie Rodgers
October 14, 1957	1	"Wake Up Little Susie"	The Everly Brothers
October 21, 1957	7	"Jailhouse Rock"	Elvis Presley
December 9, 1957	2	"You Send Me"	Sam Cooke
December 23, 1957	2	"April Love"	Pat Boone

== Top hits on record ==
- "All Shook Up" – Elvis Presley
- "An Affair To Remember" – Nat King Cole
- "And That Reminds Me" – Della Reese
- "Almost In Your Arms (Love Theme From Houseboat) – Sophia Loren
- "April Love" – Pat Boone
- "Around the World" – Nat King Cole
- "A Teenager's Romance" – Ricky Nelson
- "At the Hop" — Danny & the Juniors
- "Bad Motorcycle"- The Storey Sisters
- "Be-Bop Baby" – Ricky Nelson
- "Bernardine" – Pat Boone
- "Black Slacks" – Joe Bennett & the Sparkletones
- "Blue Starr" – Kay Starr
- "Blueberry Hill" – Fats Domino
- "Butterfly" – Andy Williams
- "Buzz-Buzz-Buzz" – The Hollywood Flames
- "Bye Bye Love" – Everly Brothers
- "Chances Are" – Johnny Mathis
- "Come Go With Me" – The Dell-Vikings, one of the first integrated groups
- "Crazy Street" – Matys Brothers (some sources say 1958)
- "Dark Moon" – Gale Storm, originally recorded by Bonnie Guitar
- "Deep Purple" – Billy Ward & The Dominoes
- "Diana" – Paul Anka
- "Drive-In Show"- Eddie Cochran
- "Everyday" – Buddy Holly
- "Fascination", recorded by
  - Nat King Cole
  - Jane Morgan & The Troubadors
- "Forbidden Fruit" – Anita Ellis
- "Four Walls" – Jim Reeves
- "Gonna Find Me a Bluebird", recorded by
  - Marvin Rainwater
  - Eddy Arnold
- "Great Balls Of Fire" – Jerry Lee Lewis
- "The Greater Sin" – Frankie Laine
- "Gunfight At the OK Corral" – Frankie Laine
- "Happy, Happy Birthday, Baby" – The Tune Weavers
- "Hey, Schoolgirl" – Tom and Jerry
- "Histoire d'un amour" – Dalida
- "Honeycomb" – Jimmie Rodgers
- "Hoot Owl" – Guy Mitchell
- "How High The Moon" – Pat Suzuki
- "I Like Your Kind of Love" – Andy Williams
- "I'm Available" – Margie Rayburn
- "I'm Not a Juvenile Delinquent" – Frankie Lymon and The Teenagers
- "I'm Sorry" – The Platters
- "I'm Stickin' with You" – Jimmy Bowen with The Rhythm Orchids
- "I'm Walkin'" – Ricky Nelson
- "I'm Walking The Floor Over You" – Georgia Gibbs
- "It's Not For Me To Say" – Johnny Mathis
- "Jailhouse Rock" – Elvis Presley
- "Jim Dandy"- LaVern Baker
- "Kisses Sweeter Than Wine" – Jimmie Rodgers
- "Last Train to San Fernando" – Johnny Duncan (huge hit in the UK)
- "Lips of Wine" – Andy Williams
- "Little Darlin' " – The Diamonds, a cover of The Gladiolas' rhythm and blues hit
- "The Lonesome Road" – Frankie Laine
- "Starlight" Jack Huddle
- "Long Lonely Nights"- Lee Andrews & the Hearts
- "Look Homeward, Angel" – Johnnie Ray
- "Love Letters in the Sand" – Pat Boone
- "Loving You" – Elvis Presley
- "Lucille" – Little Richard
- "Moonlight Gambler" – Frankie Laine
- "Mr. Lee" – The Bobbettes
- "My Juanita"- The Crests
- "My Special Angel" – Bobby Helms
- "Not Fade Away" – Buddy Holly
- "Oh Boy" – Buddy Holly
- "Old Cape Cod" – Patti Page
- "Out in the Cold Again" – The Teenagers featuring Frankie Lymon
- "Party Doll" – Buddy Knox
- "Peggy Sue" – Buddy Holly
- "Pink Champagne" – The Tyrones
- "Queen Of The Senior Prom" – The Mills Brothers
- "Raunchy" – Bill Justis
- "Reet Petite" – Jackie Wilson
- "Remember You're Mine" – Pat Boone
- "Rock-A-Billy" – Guy Mitchell
- "Rock-A-Bye Baby Blues" – Brenda Lee
- "Rock and Roll Music" – Chuck Berry
- "Rockin' at the 2i's" – Wee Willie Harris
- "Round and Round" – Perry Como
- "Sail Along, Silv'ry Moon" – Billy Vaughn
- "Searchin' " – The Coasters
- "Send for Me" – Nat King Cole
- "Shangri-La" – The Four Coins
- "Silent Lips" – Georgia Gibbs
- "So Rare" – Jimmy Dorsey
- "Stardust" – Nat King Cole
- "Start Movin' (In My Direction)" – Sal Mineo
- "The Stroll" – The Diamonds
- "Stood Up" – Ricky Nelson
- "Sugar Moon" – Pat Boone
- "Sugartime" – McGuire Sisters
- "Tammy", recorded by
  - Ames Brothers
  - Debbie Reynolds
- "Teddy Bear" – Elvis Presley
- "Teen-Age Crush" – Tommy Sands
- "That'll Be the Day" – The Crickets, Buddy Holly's group
- "3:10 To Yuma" – Frankie Laine
- "Too Much" – Elvis Presley
- "Too Young To Have A Broken Heart" – Gayla Peevey
- "Treat Me Nice" – Elvis Presley
- "The Twelfth Of Never" – Johnny Mathis
- "Tu n'as pas très bon caractère" – Dalida
- "Tutti Frutti" – Little Richard
- "Up Above My Head" – Johnnie Ray and Frankie Laine
- "Valley of Tears" – Fats Domino
- "Wait A Minute"- Jo Ann Campbell
- "Waitin' in School" – Ricky Nelson
- "Wake Up Little Susie" – The Everly Brothers
- "Walkin' After Midnight" – Patsy Cline
- "When I Fall in Love" – Nat King Cole
- "Whispering Bells" – The Del-Vikings
- "White Silver Sands – Don Rondo
- "Who Needs You" – The Four Lads
- "Whole Lotta Shakin' Goin' On" – Jerry Lee Lewis
- "Why Baby Why" – Pat Boone
- "Willie and the Hand Jive" – Johnny Otis
- "Witchcraft" – Frank Sinatra
- "Wonderful! Wonderful!" – Johnny Mathis
- "Words of Love", recorded by
  - Buddy Holly
  - The Diamonds
- "You Know How It Is" – Frankie Laine
- "You Send Me" – Sam Cooke
- "Young Blood" – The Coasters, a two-sided hit with "Searchin"'
- "Young Love", recorded by
  - Crew-Cuts
  - Tab Hunter
  - Sonny James
- "You're My One and Only Love" – Ricky Nelson

== Published popular music ==
- "An Affair to Remember (Our Love Affair)" w. Harold Adamson & Leo McCarey m. Harry Warren
- "After School" w.m. Dick Wolf & Warren Nadel
- "All Shook Up" w.m. Otis Blackwell & Elvis Presley
- "All the Way" w. Sammy Cahn m. Jimmy Van Heusen
- "Almost Paradise" m. Norman Petty
- "Alone (Why Must I Be Alone)" w. Selma Craft m. Morton Craft
- "America" w. Stephen Sondheim m. Leonard Bernstein
- "April Love" w. Paul Francis Webster m. Sammy Fain
- "At the Hop" w.m. Artie Singer, Johnny Medora & Dave White
- "Bernardine" w.m. Johnny Mercer
- "Bony Moronie" w.m. Larry Williams
- "The Book of Love" w.m. Warren Davies, George Malone & Charles Patrick
- "Boy on a Dolphin" w.(Eng) Paul Francis Webster (Greek) Jean Fermanoglou m. Takis Morakis
- "Butterfly" w.m. Anthony September
- "Bye Bye Love" w.m. Felice & Boudleaux Bryant
- "Ca, C'est L'Amour" w.m. Cole Porter. Introduced by Taina Elg in the film Les Girls.
- "Catch a Falling Star" w.m. Lee Pockriss & Paul Vance
- "Chances Are" w. Al Stillman m. Robert Allen
- "Chantez, Chantez" w. Albert Gamse m. Irving Fields
- "Cocoanut Sweet" w. E. Y. Harburg m. Harold Arlen
- "Come Fly with Me" w. Sammy Cahn m. Jimmy Van Heusen
- "Come Go with Me" w.m. Clarence E. Quick
- "Cool" w. Stephen Sondheim m. Leonard Bernstein
- "Dark Moon" w.m. Ned Miller
- "The Day the Rains Came" w.(Eng) Carl Sigman (Fr) Pierre Delanoë m. Gilbert Bécaud
- "Diana" w.m. Paul Anka
- "Do I Love You Because You're Beautiful?" w. Oscar Hammerstein II m. Richard Rodgers
- "Everyday" Charles Hardin, Norman Petty
- "The First Time Ever I Saw Your Face" w.m. Ewan MacColl
- "Four Walls" w.m. George Campbell & Marvin Moore
- "From a Jack to a King" w.m. Ned Miller
- "Gee, Officer Krupke" w. Stephen Sondheim m. Leonard Bernstein from the musical West Side Story
- "Gigi" w. Alan Jay Lerner m. Frederick Loewe
- "The Girl with the Golden Braids" m. Eddie Snyder w. Stanley J. Kahan
- "Goodnight My Someone" w.m. Meredith Willson
- "Got-Ta Have Something in the Bank, Frank" Bob Hilliard, Mort Garson
- "Great Balls of Fire" w.m. Jack Hammer & Otis Blackwell
- "A Handful of Songs" Tommy Steele, Lionel Bart & Michael Pratt
- "Happy, Happy Birthday Baby" w.m. Margo Sylvia & Gilbert Lopez
- "Hey Schoolgirl" w. Art Garfunkel m. Paul Simon
- "Hula Love" adapted by Buddy Knox from the 1911 song "My Hula Hula Love"
- "I Can't Stop Loving You" w.m. Don Gibson
- "I Feel Pretty" w. Stephen Sondheim m. Leonard Bernstein
- "I Just Don't Know" w. Joe Stone m. Robert Allen
- "I Like Your Kind of Love" Melvin Endsley
- "I'm Sorry" w.m. Buck Ram
- "In My Own Little Corner" w. Oscar Hammerstein II m. Richard Rodgers
- "In the Middle of an Island" w.m. Ted Varnick & Nick Acquaviva
- "Island in the Sun" w.m. Harry Belafonte & Irving L. Burgie
- "It's Good to Be Alive" w.m. Bob Merrill
- "Ivy Rose" w.m. Al Hoffman & Dick Manning
- "Jailhouse Rock" w.m. Jerry Leiber and Mike Stoller
- "Jingle Bell Rock" w.m. Joseph Beal & James Boothe
- "Just Between You and Me" w.m. Lee Cathy & Jack Keller
- "Just Born" w.m. Luther Dixon & Billy Dawn Smith
- "Let It Be Me" w.(Eng) Mann Curtis (Fr) Pierre Delanoë m. Gilbert Bécaud
- "Lida Rose" w.m. Meredith Willson
- "Liechtensteiner Polka" w.(Eng) Joseph Seener w.m. Edmund Koetscher & Rudi Lindt
- "Lips of Wine" w. Shirley Wolfe m. Sy Soloway
- "Little Biscuit" w. E. Y. Harburg m. Harold Arlen
- "The Little Blue Man" w.m. Fred Ebb & Paul Klein
- "Little Darlin' " w.m. Maurice Williams
- "Loving You" w.m. Jerry Leiber and Mike Stoller
- "Lucille" w.m. Richard Penniman & Albert Collins
- "Magic Moments" w. Hal David m. Burt Bacharach
- "Mama Look at Bubu" w.m. Lord Melody
- "Mean Woman Blues" w.m. Claude Demetrius
- "Mi Casa, Su Casa" w.m. Al Hoffman & Dick Manning
- "Moonlight Swim" w. Sylvia Dee m. Ben Weisman
- "My Heart Reminds Me" (aka "And That Reminds Me") w. (Eng) Al Stillman m. Camillo Bargoni
- "My Special Angel" w.m. Jimmy Duncan
- "Napoleon" w. E. Y. Harburg m. Harold Arlen
- "Oh Boy!" w.m. Sunny West, Norman Petty & Bill Tilghman
- "Oh Lonesome Me" w.m. Don Gibson
- "Old Cape Cod" w.m. Claire Rothrock, Milt Yakus & Allan Jeffrey
- "One Hand, One Heart" w. Stephen Sondheim m. Leonard Bernstein
- "Party Doll" w.m. Jimmy Bowen & Buddy Knox
- "Passing Strangers" Mel Mitchell, Stanley Applebaum
- "Peggy Sue" w.m. Jerry Allison, Norman Petty & Buddy Holly
- "Pretend You Don't See Her" w.m. Steve Allen
- "A Pub with No Beer" w.m. Gordon Parsons
- "Put a Light in the Window" w. Rhoda Roberts m. Kenny Jacobson
- "Rainbow" w.m. Russ Hamilton
- "Raunchy" m. William E. Justis Jr & Sidney Manker
- "Reet Petite" T. Carlo, Berry Gordy
- "Remember You're Mine" Bernie Lowe, Kal Mann
- "Rock and Roll Music" w.m. Chuck Berry
- "Rock-A-Billy" w.m. Woody Harris & Eddie V. Deane
- "Sadder But Wiser Girl for Me" w.m. Meredith Willson
- "Santa, Bring My Baby Back (To Me)" w.m. Claude Demetrius & Aaron Schroeder
- "Sayonara" w.m. Irving Berlin
- "School Day" w.m. Chuck Berry
- "Searchin' " w.m. Jerry Leiber and Mike Stoller
- "Send for Me" w.m. Ollie Jones
- "Seventy-Six Trombones" w.m. Meredith Willson
- "She Was Only Seventeen" w.m. Marty Robbins
- "Shiralee" w.m. Tommy Steele
- "Short Fat Fanny" Larry Williams
- "Silhouettes" w.m. Frank Slay & Bob Crewe
- "Something's Coming" w. Stephen Sondheim m. Leonard Bernstein
- "Somewhere" w. Stephen Sondheim m. Leonard Bernstein. Introduced by Reri Grist in the musical West Side Story
- "The Song of Raintree County" w. Paul Francis Webster & Raymond Egan m. Richard Whiting
- "Song of the Clyde" w. R. Y Bell m. Ian Gourlay
- "Spooky Polka" – m. John Serry Sr.
- "The Story of My Life" w. Hal David m. Burt Bacharach
- "The Stroll" w.m. Nancy Lee & Clyde Otis
- "Tammy" w. Jay Livingston m. Ray Evans. Introduced by Debbie Reynolds in the film Tammy and the Bachelor
- "Teddy Bear" w.m. Kal Mann & Bernie Lowe. Introduced by Elvis Presley in the film Loving You
- "Tele Vee Shun" Stan Freberg
- "Ten Minutes Ago" w. Oscar Hammerstein II m. Richard Rodgers
- "That'll Be the Day" w.m. Buddy Holly, Norman Petty & Jerry Allison
- "Till" w.m. Carl Sigman, Charles Sananes & Pierre Buisson
- "Till There Was You" w.m. Meredith Willson. Introduced by Robert Preston and Barbara Cook in the musical The Music Man
- "Tonight" w. Stephen Sondheim & Leonard Bernstein m. Leonard Bernstein
- "Treat Me Nice" w.m. Jerry Leiber and Mike Stoller
- "Trouble (In River City)" w.m. Meredith Willson. Introduced by Robert Preston in the musical The Music Man.
- "The Twelfth of Never" adapt. (folk song) w. Paul Francis Webster m. Jerry Livingston
- "Twenty-six Miles" w.m. Bruce Bell & Glen Larson
- "A Very Special Love" w.m. Robert Allen
- "Wake Up Little Susie" w.m. Felice & Boudleaux Bryant
- "Walking Along" Sam Weiss, Winston Willis
- "White Silver Sands" w.m. Charles G. Matthews & Gladys Reinhardt
- "A White Sport Coat" w.m. Marty Robbins
- "Whole Lotta Shakin' Goin' On" w.m. Dave Williams & Sunny David
- "Whole Lotta Woman" w.m. Marvin Rainwater
- "Why Baby Why" w.m. Luther Dixon & Larry Harrison
- "Why Don't They Understand" Jack Fishman, Joe Henderson
- "Wild Is the Wind" w. Ned Washington m. Dimitri Tiomkin
- "Wind in the Willows" Wecht, Singer, Singer
- "Witchcraft" w. Carolyn Leigh m. Cy Coleman
- "Wonderful! Wonderful!" w. Ben Raleigh m. Sherman Edwards
- "Yellow Bird" w.m. Alan Bergman, Marilyn Keith & Norman Luboff
- "You Need Hands" w.m. Roy Irwin

== Classical music ==
=== Premieres ===
Composer	Composition	Date	Location	Performers
Arnold, Malcolm	Horn Concerto No. 2	1957-07-17	Cheltenham Music Festival, UK	Brain / Hallé Orchestra – Arnold
Bainton, Edgar	Symphony No. 3	1957-03-25 (Note: Posthumous premiere)	Sydney, Australia	Sydney Symphony – Heinze
Barraqué, Jean	Piano Sonata	1957-10-28	Paris (Note: Recording. The Sonata was performed publicly for the first time in concert in April 1967 by Elisabeth Klein in Copenhagen.)	Loriod
Berio, Luciano	Mutazioni	1957-04-24	Milan, Italy	Electronic music on tape
Crumb, George	Sonata for Solo Cello	1957-03-15	Ann Arbor, Michigan	Doppmann
Davies, Peter Maxwell	Clarinet Sonata	1957-07-20	Darmstädter Ferienkurse, Germany	Dobrée, Davies
Hartmann, Karl Amadeus	Versuch eines Requiem (Symphony No. 1) (Note: Revision of a cantata composed in 1938 and premiered in 1948. Until then Miserae had been Hartmann's Symphony No. 1.)	1957-06-22	Vienna, Austria	Rössl-Majdan / Vienna Symphony – Sanzogno
Henze, Hans Werner	Maratona, ballet suite	1957-02-08	Cologne, Germany	SWF Symphony – Rosbaud
Ives, Charles	From the Salvation Army (String Quartet No. 1) (1900)	1957-04-24	New York City	Kohon Quartet
Larsson, Lars-Erik	Concertini: No. 4, for Bassoon	1957-12-10	Gothenburg, Sweden	Rönnerbäck / Gothenburg Radio Orchestra – Staern
Martinů, Bohuslav	Piano Sonata	1957–?-?	Düsseldorf, Germany	Serkin
Matsudaira, Yoritsune	Figures sonores	1957-06-01	Zürich, Switzerland (ISCM Festival)	[unknown orchestra] – Schmid
Nono, Luigi	Varianti	1957-10-20	Donaueschingen, Germany (Musiktage)	SWF Symphony – Rosbaud
Prokofiev, Sergei	Symphony No. 4 (2nd version) (1948)	1957-01-05 (Note: Concert premiere. The Symphony had been previously recorded by the BBC Symphony conducted by Adrian Boult in March 1950 for a radio broadcast.)	Moscow	USSR State Symphony – Gennady Rozhdestvensky
Rubbra, Edmund	Symphony No. 7	1957-10-01	Birmingham, UK	City of Birmingham Symphony – Panufnik
Shostakovich, Dmitri	Piano Concerto No. 2	1957-05-10	Moscow	M. Shostakovich / USSR State Symphony – Anosov
Shostakovich, Dmitri	Symphony No. 11 ("The Year 1905")	1957-10-30	Moscow	USSR State Symphony – Rakhlin
Simpson, Robert	Symphony No. 2	1957-07-16	Cheltenham Music Festival, UK	Hallé Orchestra – Barbirolli
Stockhausen, Karlheinz	Klavierstück XI	1957-04-22 (Note: In two versions. Unofficial premiere, given at the time without permission, but now acknowledged by the publisher. Originally, the official premiere was given as 28 July 1957, the last day of the Darmstädter Ferienkurse, in the Darmstadt orangerie, in two versions played by Paul Jacobs. This is now regarded as the European premiere.)	New York (Carl Fischer Hall)	Tudor
Stravinsky, Igor	Agon	1957-12-01	Los Angeles	Robert Craft
Takemitsu, Tōru	Requiem for Strings	1957-06-20	Tokyo	Tokyo Philharmonic – Ueda
Tubin, Eduard	Double Bass Concerto	1957-03-08	Bogotá, Colombia	Verdaguer / Colombia National Symphony – Roots
Villa-Lobos, Heitor	Piano Concerto No. 3	1957-08-24	Theatro Municipal, Rio de Janeiro	Arnaldo Estrella / Orquestra Sinfônica Brasileira – Carvalho
Xenakis, Iannis	Pithoprakta	1957-03-08	Musica Viva (Munich)	Bavarian Radio Symphony – Scherchen

=== Compositions ===
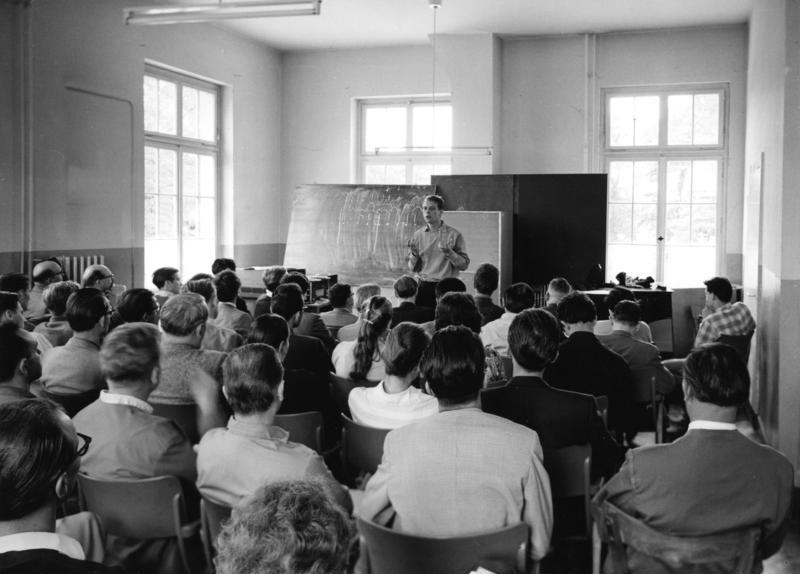
Karlheinz Stockhausen lecturing on his Klavierstück XI at Darmstädter Ferienkurse in July 1957

- Hugo Alfvén – Den förlorade sonen (The Prodigal Son), R214
- Malcolm Arnold – Symphony No. 3
- Luciano Berio – Serenata I
- Ernest Bloch
  - Suite No. 3 for Solo Cello
  - Piano Quintet No. 2
- Pierre Boulez – Le Marteau sans maître (1953–55/1957)
- John Cage – Winter Music
- Aaron Copland – Orchestral Variations
- Pierre Gabaye – Boutade
- Henryk Górecki –
  - Sonata for two violins, Op. 10
  - Concerto for Five Instruments and String Quartet, Op. 11
- Jørgen Jersild – 3 Madrigali
- Wojciech Kilar – Lullabies, solo cantatas for soprano and seven instruments
- Giselher Klebe – Concerto for cello and orchestra
- Jan Klusák – Concerto grosso
- László Lajtha – Symphony No. 7, Revolution (A tribute to the Hungarian Revolution in 1956 against the Soviet suppression)
- Bohuslav Martinů – Romance z pampelišek, H. 364
- Toshiro Mayuzumi – Phonologie Symphonique
- Ennio Morricone – Concerto, for orchestra
- Per Nørgård – Piano Sonata No. 2, Op. 20
- Walter Piston – Viola Concerto
- Allan Pettersson – Concerto for String Orchestra No. 3
- Francis Poulenc – Flute Sonata, FP 164
- Hilding Rosenberg – String Quartets nos. 8 – 12
- Edmund Rubbra – Seventh Symphony
- John Serry Sr. – Reeds in a Rush, American Rhapsody
- Roger Sessions – Symphony No. 3
- Alfred Schnittke – Symphony No. 0
- Dmitri Shostakovich
  - Piano Concerto No. 2 in F major
  - Symphony No. 11 in G minor, Op. 103 "The Year 1905"
- Elie Siegmeister – Symphony No. 3
- Karlheinz Stockhausen – Gruppen for three orchestras (1955–57)
- Tōru Takemitsu – Requiem for Strings
- Vladimir Ussachevsky – Metamorphosis
- Galina Ustvolskaya – Piano Sonata No. 4
- Ralph Vaughan Williams
  - Blake Songs (10)
  - Symphony No. 9
- Heitor Villa-Lobos
  - Piano Concerto No. 3
  - String Quartet No. 17
  - Symphony No. 12
- William Walton – Partita for Orchestra
- Mieczysław Weinberg – Symphony No. 4
- Malcolm Williamson
  - A Vision of Beasts and Gods, song cycle for high voice and piano
  - Santiago de Espada, overture for orchestra
  - Symphony No. 1 – Elevamini, for orchestra
- Iannis Xenakis – Achorripsis
- Bernd Alois Zimmermann
  - Canto di speranza
  - Die fromme Helene
  - Omnia tempus habent

== Opera ==
- John Eaton – Ma Barker
- Bohuslav Martinů – The Greek Passion
- Douglas Moore – Gallantry
- Ildebrando Pizzetti – Assassinio nella Cattedrale
- Francis Poulenc – Dialogues of the Carmelites (Dialogues des Carmelites)
- Joan Trimble – Blind Raftery (for television)
- Heitor Villa-Lobos – Daughter of the Clouds

== Film ==
- Malcolm Arnold - The Bridge on the River Kwai (featuring the famous march by Kenneth J. Alford)
- George Duning - 3:10 to Yuma
- Gerald Fried - Paths of Glory
- Hugo Friedhofer - An Affair to Remember
- Erik Nordgren - The Seventh Seal
- Nino Rota - Nights of Cabiria
- Dimitri Tiomkin - Gunfight at the O.K. Corral
- Franz Waxman - Peyton Place
- Franz Waxman - The Spirit of St. Louis

== Musical theatre ==
- Brigadoon (Alan Jay Lerner and Frederick Loewe) — Broadway revival
- Damn Yankees (Richard Adler and Jerry Ross) — London production
- Katharina Knie opened at the Staatstheater am Gärtnerplatz in Munich on January 20
- The Music Man (Meredith Willson) opened at the Majestic Theatre on Broadway on December 19, 1957, and ran for 1375 performances.
- New Girl in Town (George Abbott and Bob Merrill) Broadway production, opened at the 46th St. Theatre and ran for 431 performances
- West Side Story (Leonard Bernstein) — Broadway production, opened at the Winter Garden Theatre and ran for 732 performances
- Zuleika — London production, Saville Theatre

== Musical films ==
- Funny Face starring Fred Astaire and Audrey Hepburn
- Jailhouse Rock starring Elvis Presley
- Les Girls starring Gene Kelly, Mitzi Gaynor and Kay Kendall
- Loving You released July 9 starring Elvis Presley.
- Mayabazar starring Savithri
- The Pajama Game starring Doris Day and John Raitt
- Pal Joey starring Frank Sinatra, Rita Hayworth and Kim Novak
- Pardesi, with music by Anil Biswas
- Silk Stockings, featuring Fred Astaire and Cyd Charisse

== Births ==
- January 3 – Dave Dobbyn, New Zealand singer-songwriter, guitarist and producer
- January 4
  - Brian Roy Goble, Canadian singer-songwriter (Subhumans and The Skulls) (died 2014)
  - Patty Loveless, country singer
- January 23 – Earl Falconer, reggae bass guitarist and singer (UB40)
- January 27 – Janick Gers, heavy metal guitarist (Iron Maiden)
- January 28 – Frank Skinner, English comedian, actor, presenter and writer
- February 2 – Tony Butler, rock bass guitarist (Big Country)
- February 19 – Falco, classical and rock musician (died 1998)
- February 27 – Adrian Smith, musician (Iron Maiden and Urchin)
- February 28
  - Phil Gould, drummer (Level 42)
  - Cindy Wilson, new wave singer (The B-52's)
- March 5 – Mark E. Smith, post-punk singer-songwriter (The Fall) (died 2018)
- March 12 – Marlon Jackson, vocalist (The Jackson 5)
- March 21 – John Whitfield, conductor
- March 26 – Paul Morley, music journalist
- March 28 – Oran "Juice" Jones, American R&B singer
- April 2 – Mark Alburger, composer, conductor, music journalist
- April 12 – Vince Gill
- May 2 – Markus Stockhausen, trumpeter and composer
- May 10 – Sid Vicious, punk musician (Sex Pistols) (died 1979)
- May 18 – Michael Cretu, musician
- May 27 – Siouxsie Sioux, singer (Siouxsie and the Banshees)
- June 7 – Juan Luis Guerra, Dominican singer and musician
- June 11 – Jamaaladeen Tacuma, free jazz bass guitarist
- June 14 – Maxi Jazz, singer-songwriter and rapper (Faithless) (died 2022)
- June 15 – Brad Gillis, American guitarist
- June 17
  - Phil Chevron, Irish singer-songwriter and guitarist (The Pogues)
  - Martin Dillon, American tenor and educator (died 2005)
- June 22 – Garry Gary Beers, new wave rock bass guitarist (INXS)
- June 24 – Astro (Terence Wilson), reggae singer-songwriter (UB40) (died 2021)
- June 26 – Patty Smyth, American singer-songwriter (Scandal)
- July 3
  - Peter Breiner, composer
  - Poly Styrene, punk musician
- July 30 – Christopher Miller, known as Rat Scabies, drummer
- August 2
  - Mojo Nixon, American singer-songwriter
  - Butch Vig, American drummer, songwriter and producer (Garbage and Spooner)
- August 18 – Ron Strykert, Men at Work
- August 21 – Budgie, drummer (Siouxsie and the Banshees)
- August 22 – Holly Dunn, country singer/songwriter (died 2016)
- August 26 – Dr. Alban, Nigerian-Swedish singer, songwriter, and producer
- August 31
  - Gina Schock, The Go-Go's
  - Glenn Tilbrook, vocalist (Squeeze)
- September 1
  - Gloria Estefan, singer (Miami Sound Machine)
  - Jon Moss, drummer (Culture Club)
- September 12 – Hans Zimmer, film score composer and music producer
- September 22
  - Nick Cave, singer-songwriter
  - Johnette Napolitano, Concrete Blonde
- October 2 – Freddie Jackson, American R&B singer and songwriter (d. 2026)
- October 3 – Tim Westwood, DJ
- October 5 – Lee Jay Thompson (Madness)
- October 7 – Michael W. Smith, contemporary Christian singer
- October 19 – Karl Wallinger, songwriter and multi-instrumentalist (World Party) (died 2024)
- October 20 – Anouar Brahem, oud player and composer
- October 21
  - Julian Cope, post-punk singer-songwriter and antiquarian
  - Steve Lukather, rock guitarist (Toto)
- October 16 – Kelly Marie, disco singer
- October 28 – Stephen Morris (New Order)
- November 1 – Lyle Lovett, country musician
- November 5 – Mike Score (A Flock of Seagulls)
- November 8 – Porl Thompson (The Cure)
- November 20 – Hendrik Hofmeyr, composer
- November 24 – Chris Hayes, pop rock musician (Huey Lewis and the News)
- December 6 – Adrian Borland, post-punk musician The Sound (died 1999)
- December 6
  - Bob Drake, avant-garde musician
  - Jack Lee, bagpiper
- December 9
  - Donny Osmond, singer (Osmonds)
  - Steve Taylor, singer, record producer
- December 10 – Paul Hardcastle, composer and musician
- December 12 – Sheila E., singer-songwriter and percussionist
- December 20
  - Anita Baker, R&B singer-songwriter
  - Billy Bragg, singer-songwriter
  - Anna Vissi, singer
- December 22 – Tsai Chin, singer
- December 24 – Ian Burden, English keyboardist and composer (The Human League)
- December 25 – Shane MacGowan, Celtic punk singer-songwriter (The Pogues) (died 2023)
- December 27 – Jerry Gaskill, American drummer
- date unknown
  - Annette A. Aguilar, Latin jazz percussionist
  - Charles Roland Berry, composer
  - Kartik Seshadri, sitarist and composer

== Deaths ==
- January – Gertie Gitana, English music hall entertainer, 69
- January 16 – Arturo Toscanini, Italian conductor, 89
- January 18 – George Girard, American jazz trumpeter, 26 (cancer)
- February 7 – Rudolph Réti, Serbian pianist, composer and musicologist, 71
- February 16 – Josef Hofmann, Polish pianist and composer, 81
- February 21
  - "Klondike" Kate Rockwell, American vaudeville performer, 83
  - Marguerite Sylva, Belgian operatic mezzo-soprano, 81
- March 8 – Othmar Schoeck, Swiss composer, 70
- March 13 – Lena Ashwell, British Forces entertainer, 84
- March 24 – Carson Robison, American country music singer and songwriter, 66
- April 15 – Pedro Infante, Mexican actor and singer, 39 (air crash)
- May 2 – Tadeusz Kassern, Polish composer, 53 (cancer)
- May 9 – Ezio Pinza, Italian singer and actor, 64
- May 12 – Marie Rappold, German operatic soprano, 83
- June 5 – Frances Densmore, American ethnomusicologist, 90
- June 6 – Kulyash Baiseitova, Soviet opera singer, 52
- June 12 – Jimmy Dorsey, American jazz musician and big band leader, 53 (cancer)
- July 7 – Hiski Salomaa, Finnish folk singer and songwriter, 66
- July 9 – Alexander Goedicke, Soviet pianist and composer, 80
- July 16 – Serge Chaloff, American saxophonist, 33 (cancer)
- August 4 – Ivan Zorman, Slovene poet and composer, 72
- August 28 – Erik Tuxen, Danish conductor, composer and arranger, 55
- September 1 – Dennis Brain, British horn virtuoso, 36 (car accident)
- September 11 – Petar Stojanović, Serbian violinist and composer, 80
- September 19 – Heino Kaski, Finnish composer (born 1885)
- September 20 – Jean Sibelius, Finnish composer, 91
- September 28 – Luis Cluzeau Mortet, Uruguayan composer and musician, 68
- October 14 – Natanael Berg, Swedish composer, 78
- October 20 – Jack Buchanan, Scottish singer, dancer, actor and director, 66
- October 23 – Abe Lyman, American bandleader, composer and drummer, 60
- November 4 – Joseph Canteloube, French composer, 78
- November 29 – Erich Wolfgang Korngold, Austrian composer, 60
- November 30 – Beniamino Gigli, Italian operatic tenor, 67
- December 19 – Abolhasan Saba, Iranian instrumentalist, 55
- December 20 – Walter Page, American jazz musician, 57
- December 21 – Eric Coates, English composer, 71
- Undated – Ustad Qasim, Afghan musician, 78–79

== Awards ==
=== Eurovision Song Contest ===
- Eurovision Song Contest 1957
