= List of Cash Box Best Sellers number-one singles of 1957 =

These are the songs that reached number one on the Top 50 Best Sellers chart (expanded to 60 on April 13, 1957) in 1957 as published by Cash Box magazine.

Issue date	Song	Artist
January 5	"Singing the Blues"	Guy Mitchell
January 12	"Singing the Blues"	Guy Mitchell
January 19	"Singing the Blues"	Guy Mitchell
January 26	"Singing the Blues"	Guy Mitchell
February 2	"Young Love"	Sonny James, Tab Hunter
February 9	"Young Love"	Sonny James, Tab Hunter
February 16	"Too Much"	Elvis Presley
February 23	"Too Much"	Elvis Presley
March 2	"Too Much"	Elvis Presley
March 9	"Young Love"	Tab Hunter, Sonny James
March 16	"Young Love"	Tab Hunter, Sonny James
March 23	"Young Love"	Tab Hunter, Sonny James
March 30	"Young Love"	Tab Hunter, Sonny James
April 6	"Party Doll"	Buddy Knox with Rhythm Orchids, Steve Lawrence
April 13	"All Shook Up"	Elvis Presley
April 20	"All Shook Up"	Elvis Presley
April 27	"All Shook Up"	Elvis Presley
May 4	"All Shook Up"	Elvis Presley
May 11	"All Shook Up"	Elvis Presley
May 18	"All Shook Up"	Elvis Presley
May 25	"All Shook Up"	Elvis Presley
June 1	"All Shook Up"	Elvis Presley
June 8	"Love Letters in the Sand"	Pat Boone
June 15	"Love Letters in the Sand"	Pat Boone
June 22	"Love Letters in the Sand"	Pat Boone
June 29	"Love Letters in the Sand"	Pat Boone
July 6	"Love Letters in the Sand"	Pat Boone
July 13	"Love Letters in the Sand"	Pat Boone
July 20	"(Let Me Be Your) Teddy Bear"	Elvis Presley
July 27	"Bye Bye Love"	The Everly Brothers
August 3	"(Let Me Be Your) Teddy Bear"	Elvis Presley
August 10	"(Let Me Be Your) Teddy Bear"	Elvis Presley
August 17	"Tammy"	Debbie Reynolds
August 24	"Tammy"	Debbie Reynolds
August 31	"Tammy"	Debbie Reynolds
September 7	"Tammy"	Debbie Reynolds
September 14	"Tammy"	Debbie Reynolds
September 21	"Tammy"	Debbie Reynolds
September 28	"Tammy"	Debbie Reynolds
October 5	"Honeycomb"	Jimmie Rodgers
October 12	"Chances Are"	Johnny Mathis
October 19	"Chances Are"	Johnny Mathis
October 26	"Wake Up Little Susie"	The Everly Brothers
November 2	"Wake Up Little Susie"	The Everly Brothers
November 9	"Jailhouse Rock"	Elvis Presley
November 16	"Jailhouse Rock"	Elvis Presley
November 23	"Jailhouse Rock"	Elvis Presley
November 30	"You Send Me"	Sam Cooke
December 7	"You Send Me"	Sam Cooke, Teresa Brewer
December 14	"You Send Me"	Sam Cooke, Teresa Brewer
December 21	"Raunchy"	Bill Justis, Ernie Freeman
December 28	"Raunchy"	Bill Justis, Ernie Freeman

== See also ==
- 1957 in music
- List of number-one singles of 1957 (U.S.)
