= Billboard year-end top 50 singles of 1957 =

Ranking of recorded music

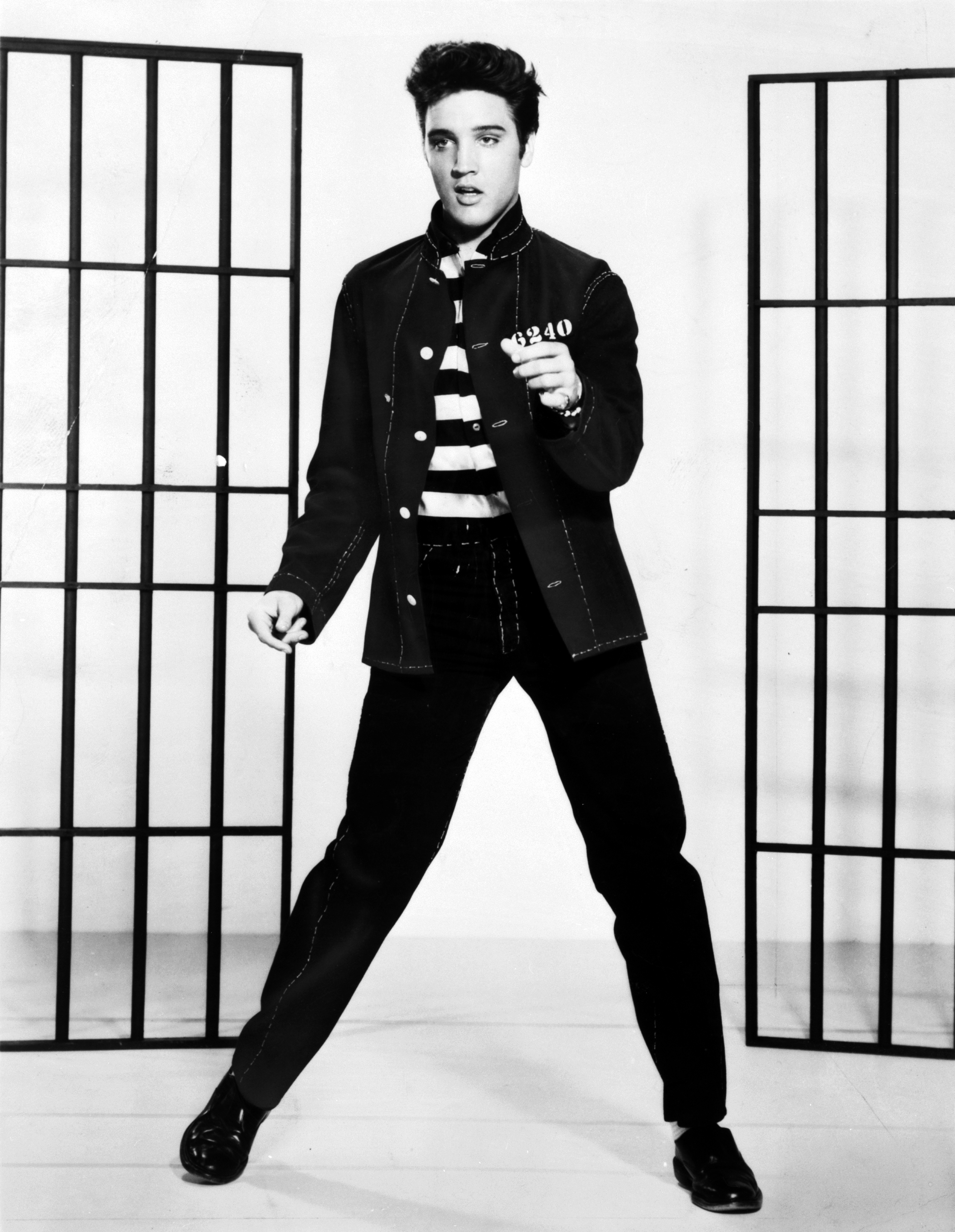
Elvis Presley had four songs on the year-end top 50, the most of any artist in 1957, including "All Shook Up", the number one song of the year.

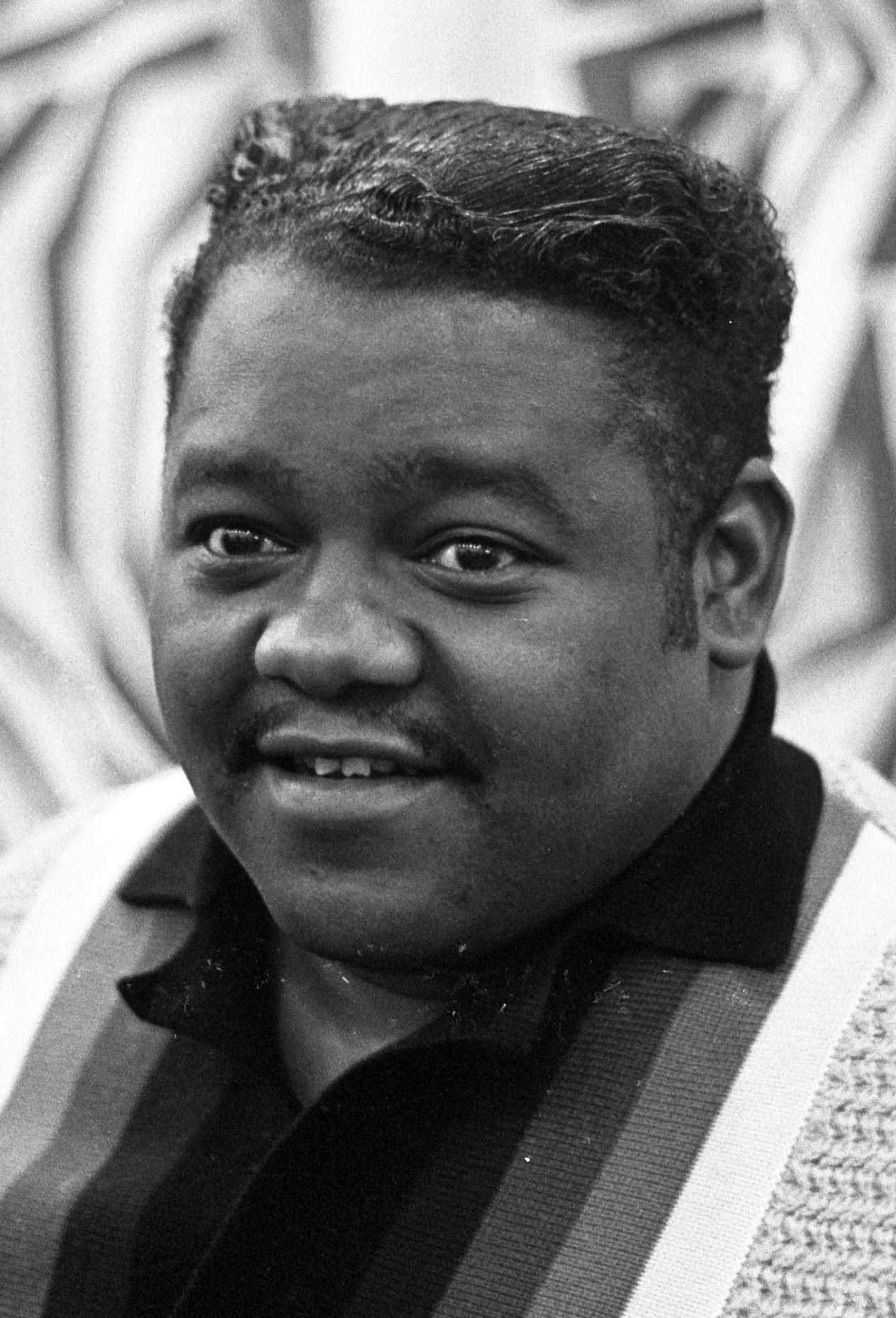
Fats Domino had three songs on the year-end top 50.

This is a list of Billboard magazine's top 50 singles of 1957 according to retail sales.

No.	Title	Artist(s)
1	"All Shook Up"	Elvis Presley
2	"Love Letters in the Sand"	Pat Boone
3	"Little Darlin'"	The Diamonds
4	"Young Love"	Tab Hunter
5	"So Rare"	Jimmy Dorsey
6	"Don't Forbid Me"	Pat Boone
7	"Singing the Blues"	Guy Mitchell
8	"Young Love"	Sonny James
9	"Too Much"	Elvis Presley
10	"Round and Round"	Perry Como
11	"Bye Bye Love"	The Everly Brothers
12	"Tammy"	Debbie Reynolds
13	"Party Doll"	Buddy Knox
14	"(Let Me Be Your) Teddy Bear"	Elvis Presley
15	"Day-O (The Banana Boat Song)"	Harry Belafonte
16	"Jailhouse Rock"	Elvis Presley
17	"A White Sport Coat (and a Pink Carnation)"	Marty Robbins
18	"Come Go with Me"	The Del-Vikings
19	"Wake Up Little Susie"	The Everly Brothers
20	"You Send Me"	Sam Cooke
21	"Searchin'"	The Coasters
22	"School Days"	Chuck Berry
23	"Gone"	Ferlin Husky
24	"Diana"	Paul Anka
25	"A Teenager's Romance"	Ricky Nelson
26	"The Banana Boat Song"	The Tarriers
27	"Honeycomb"	Jimmie Rodgers
28	"Whole Lotta Shakin' Goin On"	Jerry Lee Lewis
29	"Dark Moon"	Gale Storm
30	"That'll Be the Day"	Buddy Holly
31	"Butterfly"	Charlie Gracie
32	"Moonlight Gambler"	Frankie Laine
33	"Teen-Age Crush"	Tommy Sands
34	"It's Not for Me to Say"	Johnny Mathis
35	"Silhouettes"	The Rays
36	"Butterfly"	Andy Williams
37	"Marianne"	The Easy Riders
38	"I'm Walkin'"	Fats Domino
39	"Chances Are"	Johnny Mathis
40	"Send for Me"	Nat King Cole
41	"Rainbow"	Russ Hamilton
42	"Be-Bop Baby"	Ricky Nelson
43	"Short Fat Fannie"	Larry Williams
44	"Green Door"	Jim Lowe
45	"I'm Gonna Sit Right Down and Write Myself a Letter"	Billy Williams
46	"Old Cape Cod"	Patti Page
47	"Mr. Lee"	The Bobbettes
48	"Blueberry Hill"	Fats Domino
49	"Whispering Bells"	The Del-Vikings
50	"Blue Monday"	Fats Domino

== See also ==
- 1957 in music
- List of Billboard number-one singles of 1957
