= List of Billboard number-one singles of 1957 =

This is a list of number-one songs in the United States during the year 1957 according to Billboard magazine. Prior to the creation of the Billboard Hot 100, Billboard published multiple singles charts each week. In 1957, the following five charts were produced:

- Best Sellers in Stores – ranked the biggest selling singles in retail stores, as reported by merchants surveyed throughout the country.
- Most Played by Jockeys – ranked the most played songs on United States radio stations, as reported by radio disc jockeys and radio stations.
- Most Played in Jukeboxes – ranked the most played songs in jukeboxes across the United States (this chart was discontinued in June 1957).
- Honor Roll of Hits – a composite ten-position song chart which combined data from the three charts above along with three other component charts. It served as The Billboard's lead chart until the introduction of the Hot 100 in 1958 and would remain in print until 1963.
- Top 100 – an early version of the Hot 100, the first chart to feature a combined tabulation of sales, airplay and jukebox play.

NOTE: Billboard changed its issue dates from a Saturday to a Monday schedule on April 29, thus causing a one-week inconsistency. This would later be changed back from a Monday to a Saturday schedule on January 6, 1962. In addition, the Top 100 reported a tie for the number-one single for the issues dated April 20 and December 9, while the Honor Roll of Hits reported a tie for the number-one song for the issue dated November 4. Billboard also considered the following B-sides as sharing the number-one spot with its A-side on one of its charts:

- "Playing for Keeps" (Elvis Presley; Best Sellers in Stores; February 9); (Note: Following this week, Billboard listed only "Too Much" for the remainder of the disc's occupation in the number-one slot.)
- "Playing for Keeps" (Elvis Presley; Most Played in Jukeboxes; March 9);
- "Bernardine" (Pat Boone; Best Sellers in Stores; June 3–July 4); (Note: Excluding June 17, which only list "Love Letters in the Sand" as the number-one single.)
- "Loving You" (Elvis Presley; Best Sellers in Stores; July 8–August 19);
- "Treat Me Nice" (Elvis Presley; Best Sellers in Stores; October 21–November 18, December 16);
- "Summertime" (Sam Cooke; Best Sellers in Stores; December 2–9); and
- "When the Swallows Come Back to Capistrano" (Pat Boone; Best Sellers in Stores; December 23). (Note: Following this week, Billboard listed only "April Love" for the remainder of the disc's occupation in the number-one slot.)

Issue date	Best Sellers in Stores	Most Played by Jockeys	Most Played in Jukeboxes	Honor Roll of Hits	Top 100	Ref.
January 5	"Singing the Blues"; Guy Mitchell with Ray Conniff & his Orchestra	"Singing the Blues"; Guy Mitchell with Ray Conniff & his Orchestra	"Singing the Blues"; Guy Mitchell with Ray Conniff & his Orchestra	"Singing the Blues"	"Singing the Blues"; Guy Mitchell with Ray Conniff & his Orchestra	
January 12	"Singing the Blues"; Guy Mitchell with Ray Conniff & his Orchestra	"Singing the Blues"; Guy Mitchell with Ray Conniff & his Orchestra	"Singing the Blues"; Guy Mitchell with Ray Conniff & his Orchestra	"Singing the Blues"	"Singing the Blues"; Guy Mitchell with Ray Conniff & his Orchestra	
January 19	"Singing the Blues"; Guy Mitchell with Ray Conniff & his Orchestra	"Singing the Blues"; Guy Mitchell with Ray Conniff & his Orchestra	"Singing the Blues"; Guy Mitchell with Ray Conniff & his Orchestra	"Singing the Blues"	"Singing the Blues"; Guy Mitchell with Ray Conniff & his Orchestra	
January 26	"Singing the Blues"; Guy Mitchell with Ray Conniff & his Orchestra	"Singing the Blues"; Guy Mitchell with Ray Conniff & his Orchestra	"Singing the Blues"; Guy Mitchell with Ray Conniff & his Orchestra	"Singing the Blues"	"Singing the Blues"; Guy Mitchell with Ray Conniff & his Orchestra	
February 2	"Singing the Blues"; Guy Mitchell with Ray Conniff & his Orchestra	"Singing the Blues"; Guy Mitchell with Ray Conniff & his Orchestra	"Singing the Blues"; Guy Mitchell with Ray Conniff & his Orchestra	"Young Love"	"Singing the Blues"; Guy Mitchell with Ray Conniff & his Orchestra	
February 9	"Too Much"/"Playing for Keeps"; Elvis Presley with The Jordanaires	"Young Love"; Sonny James	"Singing the Blues"; Guy Mitchell with Ray Conniff & his Orchestra	"Young Love"	"Don't Forbid Me"; Pat Boone with Billy Vaughn's Orchestra	
February 16	"Too Much"; Elvis Presley with The Jordanaires	"Young Love"; Tab Hunter with Billy Vaughn's Orchestra and Chorus	"Singing the Blues"; Guy Mitchell with Ray Conniff & his Orchestra	"Young Love"	"Young Love"; Tab Hunter with Billy Vaughn's Orchestra and Chorus	
February 23	"Too Much"; Elvis Presley with The Jordanaires	"Young Love"; Tab Hunter with Billy Vaughn's Orchestra and Chorus	"Don't Forbid Me"; Pat Boone with Billy Vaughn's Orchestra	"Young Love"	"Young Love"; Tab Hunter with Billy Vaughn's Orchestra and Chorus	
March 2	"Young Love"; Tab Hunter with Billy Vaughn's Orchestra and Chorus	"Young Love"; Tab Hunter with Billy Vaughn's Orchestra and Chorus	"Young Love"; Tab Hunter with Billy Vaughn's Orchestra and Chorus	"Young Love"	"Young Love"; Tab Hunter with Billy Vaughn's Orchestra and Chorus	
March 9	"Young Love"; Tab Hunter with Billy Vaughn's Orchestra and Chorus	"Young Love"; Tab Hunter with Billy Vaughn's Orchestra and Chorus	"Too Much"/"Playing for Keeps"; Elvis Presley with The Jordanaires	"Young Love"	"Young Love"; Tab Hunter with Billy Vaughn's Orchestra and Chorus	
March 16	"Young Love"; Tab Hunter with Billy Vaughn's Orchestra and Chorus	"Young Love"; Tab Hunter with Billy Vaughn's Orchestra and Chorus	"Young Love"; Tab Hunter with Billy Vaughn's Orchestra and Chorus	"Young Love"	"Young Love"; Tab Hunter with Billy Vaughn's Orchestra and Chorus	
March 23	"Young Love"; Tab Hunter with Billy Vaughn's Orchestra and Chorus	"Young Love"; Tab Hunter with Billy Vaughn's Orchestra and Chorus	"Young Love"; Tab Hunter with Billy Vaughn's Orchestra and Chorus	"Young Love"	"Young Love"; Tab Hunter with Billy Vaughn's Orchestra and Chorus	
March 30	"Party Doll"; Buddy Knox with the Rhythm Orchids	"Butterfly"; Andy Williams with Orchestra conducted by Archie Bleyer	"Young Love"; Tab Hunter with Billy Vaughn's Orchestra and Chorus	"Party Doll"	"Butterfly"; Andy Williams with Orchestra conducted by Archie Bleyer	
April 6	"Round and Round"; Perry Como with Mitchell Ayres Orchestra and the Ray Charles Singers	"Butterfly"; Andy Williams with Orchestra conducted by Archie Bleyer	"Young Love"; Tab Hunter with Billy Vaughn's Orchestra and Chorus	"Butterfly"	"Butterfly"; Andy Williams with Orchestra conducted by Archie Bleyer	
April 13	"All Shook Up"; Elvis Presley with The Jordanaires	"Round and Round"; Perry Como with Mitchell Ayres Orchestra and the Ray Charles Singers	"Butterfly"; Charlie Gracie with Orchestra and Chorus Under Direction of Bernie Lowe	"Butterfly"	"Butterfly"; Andy Williams with Orchestra conducted by Archie Bleyer	
April 20	"All Shook Up"; Elvis Presley with The Jordanaires	"Round and Round"; Perry Como with Mitchell Ayres Orchestra and the Ray Charles Singers	"Butterfly"; Charlie Gracie with Orchestra and Chorus Under Direction of Bernie Lowe	"Butterfly"	"All Shook Up"; Elvis Presley with The Jordanaires "Round and Round"; Perry Como with Mitchell Ayres Orchestra and the Ray Charles Singers	
April 27	"All Shook Up"; Elvis Presley with The Jordanaires	"All Shook Up"; Elvis Presley with The Jordanaires	"All Shook Up"; Elvis Presley with The Jordanaires	"All Shook Up"	"All Shook Up"; Elvis Presley with The Jordanaires	
April 29	"All Shook Up"; Elvis Presley with The Jordanaires	"All Shook Up"; Elvis Presley with The Jordanaires	"All Shook Up"; Elvis Presley with The Jordanaires	"All Shook Up"	"All Shook Up"; Elvis Presley with The Jordanaires	
May 6	"All Shook Up"; Elvis Presley with The Jordanaires	"All Shook Up"; Elvis Presley with The Jordanaires	"All Shook Up"; Elvis Presley with The Jordanaires	"All Shook Up"	"All Shook Up"; Elvis Presley with The Jordanaires	
May 13	"All Shook Up"; Elvis Presley with The Jordanaires	"All Shook Up"; Elvis Presley with The Jordanaires	"All Shook Up"; Elvis Presley with The Jordanaires	"All Shook Up"	"All Shook Up"; Elvis Presley with The Jordanaires	
May 20	"All Shook Up"; Elvis Presley with The Jordanaires	"All Shook Up"; Elvis Presley with The Jordanaires	"All Shook Up"; Elvis Presley with The Jordanaires	"All Shook Up"	"All Shook Up"; Elvis Presley with The Jordanaires	
May 27	"All Shook Up"; Elvis Presley with The Jordanaires	"All Shook Up"; Elvis Presley with The Jordanaires	"All Shook Up"; Elvis Presley with The Jordanaires	"All Shook Up"	"All Shook Up"; Elvis Presley with The Jordanaires	
June 3	"Love Letters in the Sand"/"Bernardine"; Pat Boone with Orchestra Conducted by Billy Vaughn	"All Shook Up"; Elvis Presley with The Jordanaires	"All Shook Up"; Elvis Presley with The Jordanaires	"All Shook Up"	"All Shook Up"; Elvis Presley with The Jordanaires	
June 10	"Love Letters in the Sand"/"Bernardine"; Pat Boone with Orchestra Conducted by Billy Vaughn	"Love Letters in the Sand"; Pat Boone with Orchestra Conducted by Billy Vaughn	"All Shook Up"; Elvis Presley with The Jordanaires	"Love Letters in the Sand"	"Love Letters in the Sand"; Pat Boone with Orchestra Conducted by Billy Vaughn	
June 17	"Love Letters in the Sand"; Pat Boone with Orchestra Conducted by Billy Vaughn	"Love Letters in the Sand"; Pat Boone with Orchestra Conducted by Billy Vaughn	"All Shook Up"; Elvis Presley with The Jordanaires	"Love Letters in the Sand"	"Love Letters in the Sand"; Pat Boone with Orchestra Conducted by Billy Vaughn	
June 24	"Love Letters in the Sand"/"Bernardine"; Pat Boone with Orchestra Conducted by Billy Vaughn	"Love Letters in the Sand"; Pat Boone with Orchestra Conducted by Billy Vaughn	Chart discontinued	"Love Letters in the Sand"	"Love Letters in the Sand"; Pat Boone with Orchestra Conducted by Billy Vaughn	
July 1	"Love Letters in the Sand"/"Bernardine"; Pat Boone with Orchestra Conducted by Billy Vaughn	"Love Letters in the Sand"; Pat Boone with Orchestra Conducted by Billy Vaughn	Chart discontinued	"Love Letters in the Sand"	"Love Letters in the Sand"; Pat Boone with Orchestra Conducted by Billy Vaughn	
July 8	"(Let Me Be Your) Teddy Bear"/"Loving You"; Elvis Presley with The Jordanaires	"Love Letters in the Sand"; Pat Boone with Orchestra Conducted by Billy Vaughn	Chart discontinued	"Love Letters in the Sand"	"Love Letters in the Sand"; Pat Boone with Orchestra Conducted by Billy Vaughn	
July 15	"(Let Me Be Your) Teddy Bear"/"Loving You"; Elvis Presley with The Jordanaires	"Love Letters in the Sand"; Pat Boone with Orchestra Conducted by Billy Vaughn	Chart discontinued	"Love Letters in the Sand"	"(Let Me Be Your) Teddy Bear"; Elvis Presley with The Jordanaires	
July 22	"(Let Me Be Your) Teddy Bear"/"Loving You"; Elvis Presley with The Jordanaires	"Love Letters in the Sand"; Pat Boone with Orchestra Conducted by Billy Vaughn	Chart discontinued	"Love Letters in the Sand"	"(Let Me Be Your) Teddy Bear"; Elvis Presley with The Jordanaires	
July 29	"(Let Me Be Your) Teddy Bear"/"Loving You"; Elvis Presley with The Jordanaires	"(Let Me Be Your) Teddy Bear"; Elvis Presley with The Jordanaires	Chart discontinued	"Love Letters in the Sand"	"(Let Me Be Your) Teddy Bear"; Elvis Presley with The Jordanaires	
August 5	"(Let Me Be Your) Teddy Bear"/"Loving You"; Elvis Presley with The Jordanaires	"(Let Me Be Your) Teddy Bear"; Elvis Presley with The Jordanaires	Chart discontinued	"(Let Me Be Your) Teddy Bear"	"(Let Me Be Your) Teddy Bear"; Elvis Presley with The Jordanaires	
August 12	"(Let Me Be Your) Teddy Bear"/"Loving You"; Elvis Presley with The Jordanaires	"(Let Me Be Your) Teddy Bear"; Elvis Presley with The Jordanaires	Chart discontinued	"(Let Me Be Your) Teddy Bear"	"(Let Me Be Your) Teddy Bear"; Elvis Presley with The Jordanaires	
August 19	"(Let Me Be Your) Teddy Bear"/"Loving You"; Elvis Presley with The Jordanaires	"Tammy"; Debbie Reynolds with Orchestra Conducted by Joseph Gershenson	Chart discontinued	"Tammy"	"(Let Me Be Your) Teddy Bear"; Elvis Presley with The Jordanaires	
August 26	"Tammy"; Debbie Reynolds with Orchestra Conducted by Joseph Gershenson	"Tammy"; Debbie Reynolds with Orchestra Conducted by Joseph Gershenson	Chart discontinued	"Tammy"	"(Let Me Be Your) Teddy Bear"; Elvis Presley with The Jordanaires	
September 2	"Tammy"; Debbie Reynolds with Orchestra Conducted by Joseph Gershenson	"Tammy"; Debbie Reynolds with Orchestra Conducted by Joseph Gershenson	Chart discontinued	"Tammy"	"Tammy"; Debbie Reynolds with Orchestra Conducted by Joseph Gershenson	
September 9	"Diana"; Paul Anka with Orchestra and Chorus conducted by Don Costa	"Tammy"; Debbie Reynolds with Orchestra Conducted by Joseph Gershenson	Chart discontinued	"Tammy"	"Tammy"; Debbie Reynolds with Orchestra Conducted by Joseph Gershenson	
September 16	"Tammy"; Debbie Reynolds with Orchestra Conducted by Joseph Gershenson	"Tammy"; Debbie Reynolds with Orchestra Conducted by Joseph Gershenson	Chart discontinued	"Tammy"	"Tammy"; Debbie Reynolds with Orchestra Conducted by Joseph Gershenson	
September 23	"That'll Be the Day"; The Crickets	"Honeycomb"; Jimmie Rodgers with Hugo Peretti and His Orchestra	Chart discontinued	"Tammy"	"Tammy"; Debbie Reynolds with Orchestra Conducted by Joseph Gershenson	
September 30	"Honeycomb"; Jimmie Rodgers with Hugo Peretti and His Orchestra	"Honeycomb"; Jimmie Rodgers with Hugo Peretti and His Orchestra	Chart discontinued	"Tammy"	"Tammy"; Debbie Reynolds with Orchestra Conducted by Joseph Gershenson	
October 7	"Honeycomb"; Jimmie Rodgers with Hugo Peretti and His Orchestra	"Honeycomb"; Jimmie Rodgers with Hugo Peretti and His Orchestra	Chart discontinued	"Tammy"	"Honeycomb"; Jimmie Rodgers with Hugo Peretti and His Orchestra	
October 14	"Wake Up Little Susie"; The Everly Brothers	"Honeycomb"; Jimmie Rodgers with Hugo Peretti and His Orchestra	Chart discontinued	"Honeycomb"	"Honeycomb"; Jimmie Rodgers with Hugo Peretti and His Orchestra	
October 21	"Jailhouse Rock"/"Treat Me Nice"; Elvis Presley	"Chances Are"; Johnny Mathis with Ray Conniff and his Orchestra	Chart discontinued	"Wake Up Little Susie"	"Wake Up Little Susie"; The Everly Brothers	
October 28	"Jailhouse Rock"/"Treat Me Nice"; Elvis Presley	"Wake Up Little Susie"; The Everly Brothers	Chart discontinued	"Wake Up Little Susie"	"Wake Up Little Susie"; The Everly Brothers	
November 4	"Jailhouse Rock"/"Treat Me Nice"; Elvis Presley	"Wake Up Little Susie"; The Everly Brothers	Chart discontinued	"Jailhouse Rock" "Wake Up Little Susie"	"Jailhouse Rock"; Elvis Presley	
November 11	"Jailhouse Rock"/"Treat Me Nice"; Elvis Presley	"Wake Up Little Susie"; The Everly Brothers	Chart discontinued	"Wake Up Little Susie"	"Jailhouse Rock"; Elvis Presley	
November 18	"Jailhouse Rock"/"Treat Me Nice"; Elvis Presley	"Wake Up Little Susie"; The Everly Brothers	Chart discontinued	"Jailhouse Rock"	"Jailhouse Rock"; Elvis Presley	
November 25	"Jailhouse Rock"/"Treat Me Nice"; Elvis Presley	"Jailhouse Rock"; Elvis Presley	Chart discontinued	"You Send Me"	"Jailhouse Rock"; Elvis Presley	
December 2	"You Send Me"/"Summertime"; Sam Cooke with Bumps Blackwell Orchestra	"Jailhouse Rock"; Elvis Presley	Chart discontinued	"You Send Me"	"Jailhouse Rock"; Elvis Presley	
December 9	"You Send Me"/"Summertime"; Sam Cooke with Bumps Blackwell Orchestra	"You Send Me"; Sam Cooke with Bumps Blackwell Orchestra	Chart discontinued	"You Send Me"	"Jailhouse Rock"; Elvis Presley "You Send Me"; Sam Cooke with Bumps Blackwell Orchestra	
December 16	"Jailhouse Rock"/"Treat Me Nice"; Elvis Presley	"April Love"; Pat Boone with Orchestra Conducted by Billy Vaughn	Chart discontinued	"April Love"	"You Send Me"; Sam Cooke with Bumps Blackwell Orchestra	
December 23	"April Love"/"When the Swallows Come Back to Capistrano"; Pat Boone with Orchestra Conducted by Billy Vaughn	"April Love"; Pat Boone with Orchestra Conducted by Billy Vaughn	Chart discontinued	"Raunchy"	"You Send Me"; Sam Cooke with Bumps Blackwell Orchestra	
December 30	"April Love"; Pat Boone with Orchestra Conducted by Billy Vaughn	"April Love"; Pat Boone with Orchestra Conducted by Billy Vaughn	Chart discontinued	"Raunchy"	"April Love"; Pat Boone with Orchestra Conducted by Billy Vaughn	

== See also ==
- 1957 in music
