= Nowhere Boy (soundtrack) =

2009 soundtrack album by various artists

Nowhere Boy (Music from and inspired by the Motion Picture)

Soundtrack album by Various artists
- Released: 14 December 2009
- Genre: Rock and roll
- Length: 76:10
- Label: Sony Music Entertainment

Nowhere Boy (Music from and inspired by the Motion Picture) is the soundtrack album to the 2009 film Nowhere Boy. The album featured the songs performed by the Quarrymen depicted at the time in the film and songs inspired by the film and John Lennon. The album was released through Sony Music Entertainment on 14 December 2009 in a double-disc format.

== Background ==
The soundtrack features several of the songs played by the Quarrymen at the time depicted in the film. Some of the new recordings were made featuring vocal performances by Johnson and the Nowhere Boys. Much of them were early rock and roll classics made up from the early 1950s to 1980s. Aaron Johnson had to learn to play guitar for landing the titular role, hence he had to learn from the works of Elvis Presley and Buddy Holly to play guitar and sing, so that he had to play Lennon.

Thomas Sangster was able to play the guitar before landing his role as Paul McCartney, but, as he is right-handed, learned how to play left-handed, à la McCartney. Producers negotiated with Yoko Ono for the rights to use Lennon's song "Mother" in the film, which Yoko gave after having watched a private screening. In addition to the featured songs, British electronica duo Goldfrapp provide the film's instrumental score. However, their work was not separately released as an album.

== Release ==
The soundtrack was released digitally on 14 December 2009 and in stores as a two-disc album on 29 December 2009 through the Sony Music Entertainment label. The first disc accompanied the songs featured in the film (also feature in the digital release) while the second disc featured rock and roll classics inspired by the film and Lennon himself.

== Reception ==
David Quantick of BBC wrote "this is a decent snapshot of Lennon's influences and an intelligent soundtrack document, an excellent sister compilation to the soundtrack of Nick Moran's Telstar, and a good record to buy anyone who wants to know what, musically, made John Lennon the artist he became." Alex Young of Consequence wrote "Blending hits from the era with freshly recorded interpretations of Lennon's music is an inspired move, and Nowhere Boy OST is a fitting ode to one of music's best songwriters."

== Track listing ==
Disc 1 — Music from Nowhere Boy
No.	Title	Artist(s)	Length
1.	"Wild One"	Jerry Lee Lewis	1:54
2.	"Mr. Sandman"	Dickie Valentine	2:17
3.	"Rocket 88"	Jackie Brenston and His Delta Cats	2:49
4.	"Shake, Rattle & Roll"	Elvis Presley	2:28
5.	"Hard Headed Woman"	Wanda Jackson	1:59
6.	"I Put a Spell on You"	Screamin' Jay Hawkins	2:27
7.	"Maggie May"	The Nowhere Boys	1:56
8.	"That'll Be the Day"	The Nowhere Boys	2:10
9.	"Rockin' Daddy"	Eddie Bond and The Stompers	1:59
10.	"Twenty Flight Rock"	Eddie Cochran	1:45
11.	"That's Alright Mama"	The Nowhere Boys	1:56
12.	"Movin' and Groovin'"	The Nowhere Boys	1:33
13.	"Raunchy"	The Nowhere Boys	2:04
14.	"Hound Dog"	Big Mama Thornton	2:51
15.	"Be-Bop-A-Lula"	Gene Vincent and The Blue Caps	2:36
16.	"Hello Little Girl"	Aaron Johnson	1:51
17.	"In Spite of All the Danger"	The Nowhere Boys	2:54
18.	"Mother"	John Lennon	3:50
Total length:			41:19

Disc 2 — Music Inspired by Nowhere Boy
No.	Title	Artist(s)	Length
19.	"Roll Over Beethoven"	Chuck Berry	2:25
20.	"Rock Around the Clock"	Bill Haley and His Comets	2:13
21.	"Rip It Up"	Little Richard	2:24
22.	"Baby, Let's Play House"	Elvis Presley	1:06
23.	"Peggy Sue"	Buddy Holly	2:31
24.	"Party Doll"	Buddy Knox	2:13
25.	"I Fought the Law"	Bobby Fuller Four	2:19
26.	"Brand New Cadillac"	Vince Taylor and His Playboys	2:37
27.	"Susie Q"	Dale Hawkins	2:14
28.	"Let the Good Times Roll"	Shirley & Lee	2:24
29.	"Money (That's What I Want)"	Barrett Strong	2:40
30.	"Ain't That a Shame"	Fats Domino	2:27
31.	"Stagger Lee"	Lloyd Price	2:23
32.	"These Dangerous Years"	Frankie Vaughan	2:14
33.	"Come Go with Me"	The Del-Vikings	2:41
Total length:			34:51

== Chart performance ==
Chart (2010)	Peak position
UK Compilation Albums (OCC)	45
UK Soundtrack Albums (OCC)	8
