= Dedicated to You =

Dedicated to You may refer to:

- Dedicated to You (Frank Sinatra album), 1950
- Dedicated to You (The "5" Royales album), 1957
- Dedicated to You (Ray Charles album), 1961
- Dedicated to You: Kurt Elling Sings the Music of Coltrane and Hartman, 2009
