= I'm Stickin' with You =

Single by Jimmy Bowen with The Rhythm Orchids

from the album Jimmy Bowen
- B-side: "Ever Lovin' Fingers"
- Released: January 1957
- Studio: Norman Petty Recording Studios (Clovis, New Mexico)
- Genre: Rock and roll
- Length: 2:06
- Label: Roulette
- Songwriter(s): Jimmy Bowen, Buddy Knox

Jimmy Bowen with The Rhythm Orchids singles chronology
"I'm Stickin' with You" (1957)	"Warm Up to Me Baby" (1957)

"I'm Stickin' with You" is a song written by Jimmy Bowen and Buddy Knox and performed by Jimmy Bowen with The Rhythm Orchids. It reached No. 9 on the US R&B chart and No. 14 on the US pop chart in 1957. The song was originally released as the B-side to Knox's 1956 song "Party Doll" and was featured on their 1957 album, Jimmy Bowen.

The single's B-side, "Ever Lovin' Fingers", reached No. 63 on the US pop chart.

== Other versions ==
- The Four Lads released a version of the song in Germany as the B-side to their 1956 single "Round and Round".
- The Fontane Sisters released a version of the song in May 1957 which reached No. 72 on the US pop chart.
- Roy Brown released a version of the song as the B-side to his 1957 single "Party Doll".
