= Jimmy Bowen =

American record producer

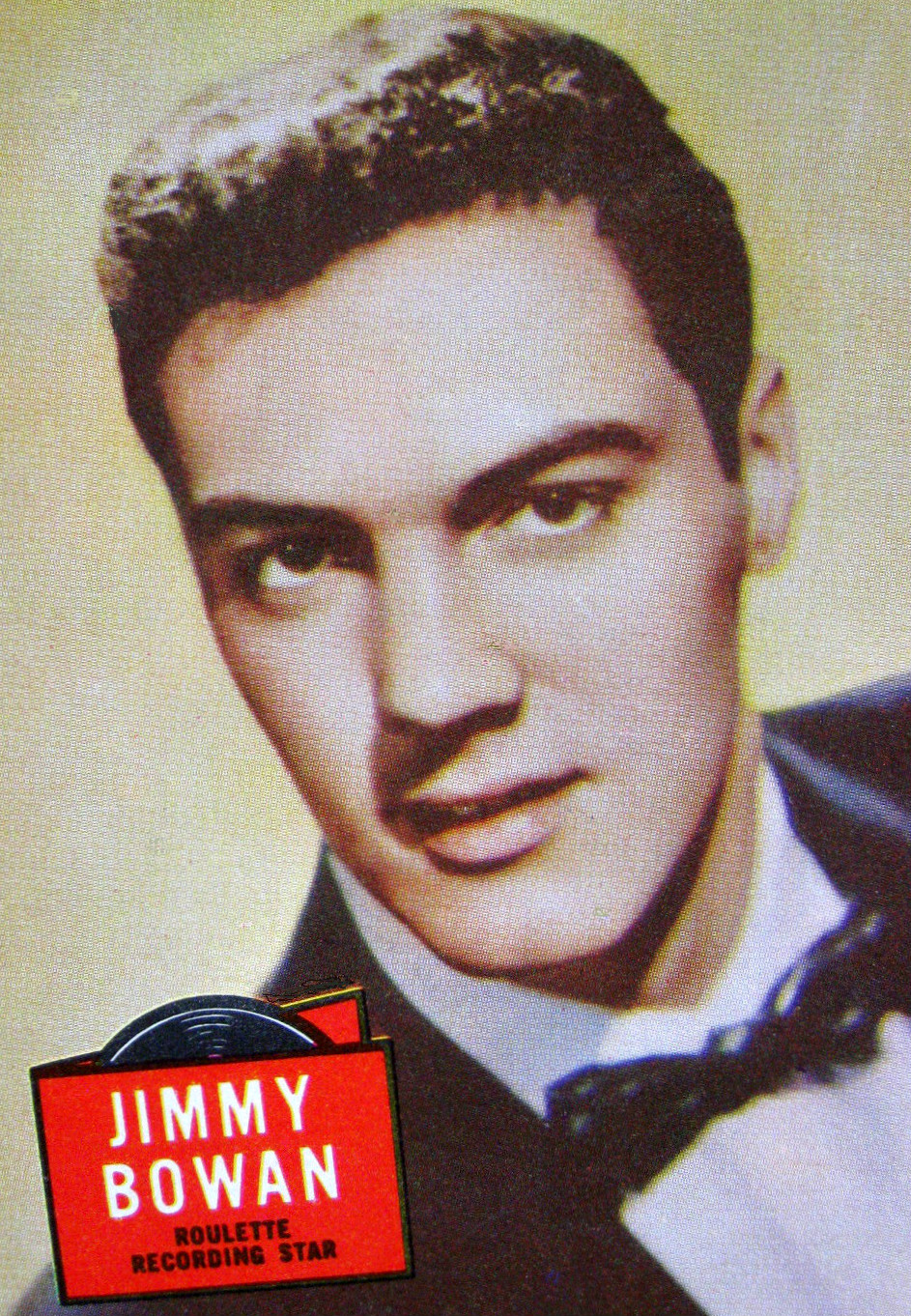
- Trading card photo of Bowen in 1957; his last name is misspelled on the card.

Background information
- Born: James Albert Bowen; November 30, 1937 (age 88); Santa Rita, New Mexico, U.S.
- Genres: Rockabilly; pop; country; jazz
- Occupations: Record producer, singer, bassist
- Years active: 1957–present

James Albert Bowen (born November 30, 1937) is an American record producer and former rockabilly singer.

== Early life ==
Bowen was born in Santa Rita, New Mexico, United States. His family moved to Dumas, Texas, when he was eight years old.

== Singing career ==
Bowen began as a teenage recording star in 1957 with "I'm Stickin' with You". The song started as the flip side of the hit record "Party Doll" by Buddy Knox (written by Knox and Bowen), but ultimately hit the charts on its own, peaking at No. 14 on Billboard's Hot 100 chart. Bowen's version sold over one million copies, and was awarded a gold record. Bowen's singing career did not take off as well as that of Knox, his partner in the Rhythm Orchids, and ultimately he abandoned a singing career, choosing to stay in the production end of the music industry.

== Producer and music executive ==
In the early 1960s, in Los Angeles, California, Bowen bucked the decade's rock phenomenon when Frank Sinatra hired him as a record producer for Reprise Records, and Bowen showed a strong knack for production, generating chart hits for Sinatra, Dean Martin, Bert Kaempfert and Sammy Davis Jr., regarded as too old-fashioned for the market at the time. Among the songs Bowen produced for Sinatra was the 1966 "Strangers in the Night", which went to No. 1 in the US and UK, and won three Grammy Awards in 1967, including Record of the Year for Bowen. Bowen brought Nancy Sinatra and Lee Hazlewood together, and introduced Sinatra to Mel Tillis for their album, Mel & Nancy.

Bowen also produced Dino, Desi & Billy, a group which included Dean Martin's son, and Desi Arnaz' and Lucille Ball's son.

In mid-1968, Bowen launched an independent record label, Amos Records, which lasted until 1971. Leaving Los Angeles for Nashville, Tennessee, Bowen became president of a series of record labels, and took each one to country music preeminence. His success stories during the second half of the 1970s and 1980s involved Glen Campbell, Kenny Rogers, Hank Williams Jr., The Oak Ridge Boys, Reba McEntire, George Strait, Suzy Bogguss, Kim Carnes and Garth Brooks. Bowen helped Conway Twitty make the 1983 album Merry Twismas, which was one of Conway's No. 1 selling albums. Bowen also revolutionized the way music was recorded in Nashville, introducing digital technology and modernizing the way in which instruments such as drums, for example, were recorded and mixed.

In 1991, Bowen produced Andy Williams' well received album Nashville.

In 1988, Bowen founded a label named Universal Records (not to be confused with the much more famous Universal Records of 1995 to 2005), which he sold to Capitol Records a year later.

== Soundtracks ==
Bowen produced his first movie soundtrack in 1970, for Vanishing Point, which was released in 1971. That soundtrack contains three songs which he composed, as well as music from the band Mountain and from Big Mama Thornton. The three Bowen pieces are an incidental theme called "Love Theme", credited to Jimmy Bowen Orchestra, and two others, "Super Soul Theme" and the hard-rock piece "Freedom of Expression", credited to The J.B. Pickers. Other soundtracks include the movies Smokey and the Bandit II (1980), The Slugger's Wife (1985) and the soundtrack of the theater play Big River (1988).

== Personal life ==
He is a graduate of the University of Pennsylvania's Wharton School of Business and holds an MBA with honors from Belmont University. He married singer Keely Smith in 1965 and produced her recordings for Reprise Records. The couple divorced in 1969. He lives with his present wife Ginger in Longmont, Colorado. In 2025, he became the honorary chair of The Dean Martin Association.

== Discography ==
=== Albums ===
Year	Album	Record label
1957	Jimmy Bowen	Roulette Records
1959	Buddy Knox & Jimmy Bowen	Roulette Records
1966	Sunday Morning with the Comics	Reprise Records
2002	Vanishing Point Original Soundtrack	Harkit Records

=== Singles ===
Year	Title	Peak chart positions		Record Label	B-side	Album
Year	Title	US Pop	US R&B	Record Label	B-side	Album
1957	"I'm Stickin' with You"	14	9	Roulette Records	"Ever Lovin' Fingers" (BB #63)	Jimmy Bowen
1957	"Warm Up to Me Baby"	57	—	Roulette Records	"I Trusted You"	Jimmy Bowen
1957	"Don't Tell Me Your Troubles"	—	—	Roulette Records	"Ever Since That Night"	
1957	"Cross Over"	—	—	Roulette Records	"It's Shameful"	
1958	"The Two Step"	—	—	Roulette Records	"By the Light of the Silvery Moon" (BB #50)	Buddy Knox & Jimmy Bowen
1958	"My Kind of Woman"	—	—	Roulette Records	"Blue Moon"	Buddy Knox & Jimmy Bowen
1958	"Always Faithful"	—	—	Roulette Records	"Wish I Were Tied to You"	
1959	"Walkin' on Air"	—	—	Roulette Records	"You're Just Wasting Your Time"	
1960	"(I Need) Your Loving Arms"	—	—	Roulette Records	"Oh Yeah! Oh Yeah! Mm Mm"	
1961	"Teenage Dreamworld"	—	—	Capehart Records	"It's Against the Law"	
1961	"Somebody to Love"	—	—	Crest Records	"Don't Drop It"	
1964	"The Big Bus"	—	—	Reprise Records	"The Biggest Lover in Town"	
1965	"The Golden Eagle"	—	—	Reprise Records	"Spanish Cricket"	
1966	"Captain Gorgeous"	—	—	Reprise Records	"Wonder Mother"	Sunday Morning with the Comics
1967	"It's Such a Pretty World Today"	—	—	Reprise Records	"Raunchy"	

== Bibliography ==
- Bowen, Jimmy; Jerome, Jim (1997). Rough Mix. New York: Simon & Schuster. ISBN 978-0684807645.
