= Preseucoela imallshookupis =

Scientific classification
- Missing taxonomy template (fix): Preseucoela
- Species: Template:Taxonomy/PreseucoelaP. imallshookupis

Binomial name
- Template:Taxonomy/PreseucoelaPreseucoela imallshookupis Buffington, 2004

Species of wasp

Preseucoela imallshookupis is a species of gall wasp. The genus name, Preseucoela, is named after Elvis Presley (combining the first half of his last name with "-eucoela", a suffix used in other related genera) while the species name is derived from the Elvis Presley song "All Shook Up". This particular species is known to attack oak trees or rose plants.

== See also ==
- List of organisms named after famous people (born 1925–1949)
