= Honeycomb (song) =

1957 single by Jimmie Rodgers

Single by Jimmie Rodgers

from the album Jimmie Rodgers
- B-side: "Their Hearts Were Full of Spring"
- Written: 1954
- Released: August 1957 (U.S.)
- Genre: Rock and roll; rockabilly
- Length: 2:15
- Label: Roulette
- Songwriter: Bob Merrill

Jimmie Rodgers singles chronology
"Honeycomb" (1957)	"Kisses Sweeter than Wine" (1957)

"Honeycomb" is a popular song written by Bob Merrill in 1954. The best-selling version was recorded by Jimmie Rodgers and charted at number one on the Billboard Top 100 in 1957 and number one for four weeks in Canada. "Honeycomb" also reached number one on the R&B Best Sellers chart and number seven on the Country & Western Best Sellers in Stores chart. It became a gold record. The song is referenced in the McGuire Sisters hit song "Sugartime", in which the soloist sings the line "Just be my honeycomb" and the word "honeycomb" is echoed by the other sisters and the male chorus.

== Film feature ==
In 2020, Jimmie Rodgers' version was featured in the Netflix psychological thriller film The Devil All the Time. In the 1999 film The Iron Giant, the song was featured when Hogarth enters his mother's restaurant.

== Cover versions ==
- In 1986, Gary Morris' version of the song was a country hit, peaking at number twenty-seven.
- Ricky Nelson covered the song on his 1957 debut album Ricky.
- In 1964, the Ray Conniff Singers covered the song on their album Invisible Tears.
- Brian Wilson covered the song in 2021. Footage of Brian Wilson recording it can be seen in the 2021 documentary Brian Wilson: Long Promised Road, and the finished recording was issued on that documentary's soundtrack.

== See also ==
- List of Billboard number-one singles of 1957
- List of Billboard number-one rhythm and blues hits
- Billboard year-end top 50 singles of 1957
- List of Cash Box Best Sellers number-one singles of 1957
- List of CHUM number-one singles of 1957
