= Lips of Wine =

Single by Andy Williams
- B-side: "Straight from My Heart"
- Released: September 1957
- Genre: Pop
- Length: 2:19
- Label: Cadence Records 1336
- Songwriter(s): Sy Soloway, Shirley Wolfe

Andy Williams singles chronology
"I Like Your Kind of Love" (1957)	"Lips of Wine" (1957)	"Are You Sincere?" (1958)

"Lips of Wine" is a song written by Sy Soloway and Shirley Wolfe and performed by Andy Williams. The song reached #17 on the Billboard chart in 1957. Archie Bleyer's Orchestra played on the song.
