= Symphony No. 3 (Arnold) =

Symphony by Malcolm Arnold

Cover of the printed score of Malcolm Arnold's Symphony No. 3

The Symphony No. 3, Op. 63 by Malcolm Arnold was finished in 1957. It is in three movements:

1. Allegro – Vivace
2. Lento
3. Allegro con brio – Presto – Lento e maestoso – Presto

The work was commissioned by the Royal Liverpool Philharmonic Society. The first performance was given by John Pritchard conducting the Royal Liverpool Philharmonic on 2 December 1957 at the Royal Festival Hall.

== Commercial recordings ==
- 1959 Malcolm Arnold and the London Philharmonic Orchestra on Everest Records SDBR 3021 (re-released on Everest 9001)
- 1994 Richard Hickox and the London Symphony Orchestra on Chandos Records CHAN 9290
- 1996 Vernon Handley and the Royal Liverpool Philharmonic on Conifer Records 75605-51258-2 (re-released on Decca 4765337)
- 1998 Andrew Penny and the RTÉ National Symphony Orchestra on Naxos Records 8.553739 (recorded 13–14 June 1996, in the presence of the composer)
