= Hula Love =

Single by Buddy Knox with The Rhythm Orchids

from the album Buddy Knox
- B-side: "Devil Woman"
- Released: August 1957
- Genre: Rockabilly
- Length: 2:18
- Label: Roulette
- Songwriter(s): Buddy Knox

Buddy Knox with The Rhythm Orchids singles chronology
"Rock Your Little Baby to Sleep" (1957)	"Hula Love" (1957)	"Swingin' Daddy" (1957)

"My Hula Hula Love" is a song with words by Edward Madden and music by Percy Wenrich published in 1911. It was adapted and retitled "Hula Love" by Buddy Knox in 1957 and performed by Knox with The Rhythm Orchids. The song was featured on his 1959 album, Buddy Knox.

== Chart performance ==
It reached #9 on the U.S. and #13 on the U.S. R&B chart in 1957. In Canada, the CHUM Charts ranked the song at #3.

== Popular culture ==
- Buddy Knox sang the song in the 1957 film Jamboree.

== Other versions ==
- Bob Lenox released a version of the song on a 1957 various artist's EP.
- Peter Kraus featuring Werner Müller and His Orchestra released a version of the song in German as the B-side to his 1958 single "Rosmarie" and it reached #1 in Germany.
- Hank Snow released a version of the song as a single in 1966, but it did not chart.
- Mud released a version of the song as a single in 1975 reaching #38 in Germany.
- Amos Garrett released a version of the song on his 1980 album Go Cat Go.
- Pearl Harbour released a version of the song as a single in 1984, but it did not chart.
