= I Like Your Kind of Love =

Single by Andy Williams
- B-side: "Stop Teasin' Me"
- Released: May 1957
- Genre: Pop
- Length: 2:26
- Label: Cadence Records 1323
- Songwriter: Melvin Endsley

Andy Williams singles chronology
"Butterfly" (1957)	"I Like Your Kind of Love" (1957)	"Lips of Wine" (1957)

"I Like Your Kind of Love" is a song written by Melvin Endsley, and performed by Andy Williams, with additional vocals by Peggy Powers. Archie Bleyer's Orchestra played on the song.

== Chart performance ==
In the US, "I Like Your Kind of Love" reached number 9 on the Billboard chart, and outside the US, it peaked at number 16 in the UK in 1957.

Chart (1957)	Peak position
Canada (CHUM Hit Parade)	3
UK Singles (OCC)	16
US Billboard Top 100	9
US Cash Box Top 100	10

== Cover versions ==
- Endsley also recorded a version of the song while he was under contract with RCA Records in 1957.
- Bob Luman and Sue Thompson released a version as a single in 1963.
