= Son nom est Dalida =

- Standard edition cover artwork

Studio album by Dalida
- Released: December 1956; 69 years ago October 29, 2002 (Reissued)
- Recorded: June – September 1956
- Studio: Studio Hoche
- Genres: Pop standard; easy listening; Italian folk
- Length: 30:58
- Languages: French; Spanish
- Label: Barclay
- Producers: Eddie Barclay (exec.); Lucien Morisse

Dalida chronology
Son nom est Dalida (1956)	Miguel (1957)

The Glamorous Dalida
- Different cover art version for releases in Anglophone countries (excluding USA)

Son nom est Dalida (Her Name Is Dalida) is the debut studio album by French vocalist Dalida. It was released in December 1956 through Barclay Records.

The tracks in the album are a mixture of vocally highlighted pop standards, of which some are basically inspired by fado and flamenco genres.

The album received positive reviews from music critics upon its release, praising Dalida's passionate performance, and nationally reached commercial success, selling around 20,000 units, bracing Dalida as the highest album seller among French singers of that time.

== Background ==
After signing a recording contract with Barclay Records in May 1956, Dalida went on to release three EPs from August to October; Madona, La violetera and Bambino respectively. After two moderately successful records, "Bambino" made Dalida an overnight star as it was an instant success that eventually became the commercially and critically one of the most successful French recordings of all time.

=== Recording and release ===
The album was completely recorded in Hoche Studios in Paris, under orchestra conduction of Raymond Lefèvre and Wal-Berg. Due to the success of the song, Bambino was used as the title one, while other tracks were fully taken from Dalida's first two EPs including her first recorded song, "Madona".

Son nom est Dalida was released during December 1956, in 25 cm (10 inch) format under catalog number 80 055. It was intended primary for French market, but its success made Barclay release it in USA, United Kingdom, South Africa and Australia. While the cover art of US release is slightly different in colour tone and is titled as Elle s'appelle Dalida (She's called Dalida), the cover for other Anglophone countries is completely different that the French one.

In 2002, Barclay Records, then as part of Universal Music France, reissued the album in original vinyl format, and a digitally remastered version in CD, both with original French cover art and track list.

==== Public acclaim and sales ====
Following its release, Son nom est Dalida received highly positive critical acclaim from major French newspapers like Le Figaro, France-Soir and Le Parisien. Dalida also promoted it during her tour in provinces that ended with her first performance in Olympia on 27 February 1957.

Since the French music industry at this time was still in the back, albums weren't covered with charts or record sales track. In early 1959, the latter formed official's disc sellers magazine Music Hall listed album with 19,530 units sold since its release in 1956.

The reissued record sold additional 8,500 copies in period of 2002–05, adding up to total sales that almost reach 30,000 units.

== Track listing ==
Side one
No.	Title	Writer(s)	Length
1.	"Bambino"	Giuseppe Fanciulli & Jacques Larue	3:31
2.	"Fado"	Henri Decker & Michèle Vendôme	3:37
3.	"Aime-moi"	Jacques Datin & Maurice Vidalin	2:48
4.	"Flamenco Bleu"	Eddy Marnay, Larry Wagner & Louis Gasté	2:23
5.	"Le torrent"	Pierre Delanoë & Pierre Havet	2:54

Side two
No.	Title	Writer(s)	Length
1.	"Madona"	Caco Velho, Diritini & Marc Lanjean	3:04
2.	"Guitare Flamenco"	Charles Dumont, Claude Delecluse & Michelle Senlis	3:06
3.	"Gitane"	Charles Dumont & Maurice Robin	2:55
4.	"Mon cœur va"	Charles Dumont & Robert Chabrier	2:52
5.	"La Violetera"	Albert Willemetz, José Padilla Sánchez & Jean Granier	3:48
Total length:			30:58

== See also ==
- Dalida discography
