= Bernardine (song) =

Song
- Published: 1957
- Songwriter: Johnny Mercer

"Bernardine", often misspelled "Bernadine," is a 1957 song that was written by Johnny Mercer. (The prolific Mercer generally wrote lyrics for other composers, but for this song he was both composer and lyricist.)

The best-known version is by Pat Boone, who had a number one hit with it on the Billboard Best Sellers in Stores chart for one week beginning June 10, 1957. This was mainly due to it being the flip side of Pat Boone's hit recording "Love Letters in the Sand". It also reached No. 14 in the Jockeys chart and No. 23 in the Top 100. The song is performed by Boone in the movie of the same name.

== Sources ==
- The Johnny Mercer Educational Archives
