= Martin Dillon (musician) =

American musician and professor

Martin Dillon in New York City in 2001

Martin Dillon (June 17, 1957 – August 21, 2005) was an American musician, operatic tenor, and professor of music at Rutgers University in Camden, New Jersey.

Dillon was very successful and active in attempting to revive German-Jewish composer and pianist, Robert Kahn's lost music. His efforts were internationally recognised by the musical and academic community. He made two acclaimed recordings dedicated to Kahn's music, Jungbrunnen (Fountain of Youth) and Der Liebe Macht (The Power of Love). Both recordings were world premiers. Dillon died before the recording of the third CD which was near completion.

Dillon was a world-renowned lyric tenor and musician who had performed several times at the Carnegie Hall in New York. He performed over 40 roles in the United States, Europe and Asia.

Dillon died about 12 hours after a concert at the Central Vermont Chamber Music Festival on 20 August 2005, due to cardiac arrest.
