= Kartik Seshadri =

- Born: 1957 (age 67–68); Madras, India
- Genres: Indian classical music
- Occupation(s): Musician, composer, educator
- Instrument: Sitar
- Years active: 1967–present
- Labels: Traditional Crossroads, Soundings
- Website: kartikseshadri.com

Kartik Seshadri (born 1957) is an Indian sitar player and teacher of Indian classical music. He is the director of the Indian Classical Music Ensemble at the University of California, San Diego.

== Career ==
Seshadri was born in Madras, India in 1957. At age 6 he began playing the sitar. When he was 18 he began studying with sitarist Pandit Ravi Shankar, and later toured and performed with his guru. In 2005 and 2010, Seshadri collaborated with prominent composer Philip Glass on the critically acclaimed Orion project. Seshadri performs extensively ranging from international venues such as Carnegie Hall, the Kennedy Center, Lincoln Center, the Melbourne International Arts Festival in Australia, to venues in India such as the Dover Lane Music Conference, ITC/SRA, Sawai Gandharva and Saptak Sammelans in India. Seshadri has received many awards and accolades for his music including his June 2012 nomination as the "artist of the month" by the prestigious Sangeeth Research Academy (SRA) in Kolkata and his most recent award (2014) from the Federation of Indian Associations (FIA) for his vision and contribution to the field of Music and Art.
