= Miguel (album) =

Studio album by Dalida
- Released: 1957
- Recorded: 1957
- Length: 22:52
- Label: Barclay

Dalida chronology
Son nom est Dalida (1957)	Miguel (1957)	Gondolier (1958)

Singles from Miguel
- 1. "Miguel (Volume 4)" Released: 1957; 2. "Le ranch de Maria (Volume 5)" Released: 1957

Miguel is the second album by Dalida. It contains eight songs, including her big success "Miguel". The songs "Maman, la plus belle du monde", "Quand on n'a que l'amour" and "Tu n'as pas très bon caractère", continue in a more pop style than her first album

== Track listing ==
Barclay – 065 042-0:

Side one
No.	Title	Writer(s)	Length
1.	"Miguel"	Marc Fontenoy & Ramón Cabrera	1:59
2.	"La plus belle du monde"	Marino Marini & Fernand Bonifay	3:39
3.	"Ay! Mourir pour toi!"	Charles Aznavour	3:39
4.	"Le petit chemin de pierres" (Scalinatella)	Giuseppe Cioffi & Jean Patrick	2:23

Side two
No.	Title	Writer(s)	Length
1.	"Le ranch de Maria" (Casetta in Canada)	Jacques Larue, Mario Panzeri & Vittorio Mascheroni	2:42
2.	"Quand on n'a que l'amour"	Jacques Brel	2:41
3.	"Tu n'as pas très bon caractère"	Ferdinando Albano & Fernand Bonifay	2:35
4.	"Tu peux tout faire de moi" (From Marchand de filles)	Fernand Bonifay & Guy Magenta	3:14
Total length:			22:52

== Singles ==
- 1957 "Miguel", also as "Volume 4"
- 1957 "Le ranch de Maria / Tu peux tout faire de moi / Quand on n'a que l'amour / Tu n'as pas très bon caractère", also "Volume 5"

== See also ==
- Dalida albums discography

== Sources ==
- L’argus Dalida: Discographie mondiale et cotations, by Daniel Lesueur, Éditions Alternatives, 2004. ISBN 2-86227-428-3 and ISBN 978-2-86227-428-7. (in French)
