= All Shook Up =

1957 single by Elvis Presley

Single by Elvis Presley
- B-side: "That's When Your Heartaches Begin"
- Released: March 22, 1957
- Recorded: January 12, 1957
- Studio: Radio Recorders, Hollywood
- Genre: Rock and roll; rhythm and blues
- Length: 1:57
- Label: RCA Victor
- Songwriters: Otis Blackwell, Elvis Presley

Elvis Presley singles chronology
"Too Much" (1957)	"All Shook Up" (1957)	"(Let Me Be Your) Teddy Bear" (1957)

Music video
- "All Shook Up" (audio) on YouTube

"All Shook Up" is a song recorded by Elvis Presley, published by Elvis Presley Music, and composed by Otis Blackwell. The single topped the U.S. Billboard Top 100 on April 13, 1957, staying there for nine weeks. It also topped the Billboard R&B chart for four weeks, becoming Presley's second single to do so, and peaked at No. 1 on the country chart as well. It is certified 2× platinum by the Recording Industry Association of America.

It was ranked No. 352 on the 2004 edition of Rolling Stone's list of the 500 Greatest Songs of All Time.

== History ==
Otis Blackwell wrote the song at the offices of Shalimar Music in 1956 after Al Stanton, one of Shalimar's owners, shaking a bottle of Pepsi at the time, suggested he write a song based on the phrase "all shook up". According to Peter Guralnick, the song has a different origin. In his book Last Train to Memphis, he wrote that Elvis Presley thought "All Shook Up" was a good phrase for a refrain. For this he received a co-writing credit. Presley himself, during an interview on October 28, 1957, said: "I've never even had an idea for a song. Just once, maybe. I went to bed one night, had quite a dream, and woke up all shook up. I phoned a pal and told him about it. By morning, he had a new song, 'All Shook Up'."

Future Last House on the Left actor David Hess, using the stage name David Hill, was the first to record the song on Aladdin Records, titled "I'm All Shook Up". In a 2009 interview, Hess revealed the origins of the song, and claimed to come up with the title of the song: "As far as 'All Shook Up', the title came from a real set of circumstances and when I decided not to write it, Otis Blackwell did and I had the first recording for Aladdin Records. It was my title, but Otis wrote the song and Presley took a writing credit in order to get him to record it. That's the way things happened in those days."

Vicki Young recorded a different song with the same title, "(I'm) All Shook Up", on Capitol Records with Big Dave and His Orchestra, written by Bill Bellman and Hal Blaine in 1956. On January 12, 1957, Presley recorded the song at Radio Recorders in Hollywood. The duet vocal on the record is by the Jordanaires first tenor Gordon Stoker. Take 10 was selected for release, and in March the song entered the Billboard Top 100 chart at No. 25. Within three weeks it had knocked Perry Como's "Round and Round" off the top spot, and stayed there for nine consecutive weeks. The song also became Presley's first No. 1 hit on the UK Singles Chart, remaining there for seven weeks. Sales of the single exceeded two million, and the song was named Billboard's Year End number one song for 1957.

== Personnel ==
Credits from Keith Flynn and Ernst Jorgensen's examination of the original session tapes, RCA paperwork/contracts, and AFM/union contracts.

The Blue Moon Boys

- Elvis Presley – lead vocals, percussion
- Scotty Moore – lead guitar
- Bill Black – double bass
- D. J. Fontana – drums

The Jordanaires

- Gordon Stoker – harmony and backing vocals
- Hoyt Hawkins – backing vocals, piano
- Neal Matthews, Hugh Jarrett – backing vocals

== Charts ==
Chart (1957)	Peak position
Belgium (Ultratop 50 Flanders)	12
Belgium (Ultratop 50 Wallonia)	21
Canada (CHUM Hit Parade)	1
Netherlands (Single Top 100)	8
UK Singles (Official Charts)	1
US Billboard Top 100	1
US Billboard Best Sellers In Stores	1
US Billboard Most Played by Jockeys	1
US Billboard Most Played in Jukeboxes	1
US Billboard Hot Country Songs	1

Chart (2005)	Peak position
Netherlands (Single Top 100)	17
Sweden (Sverigetopplistan)	57

Chart (2011)	Peak position
France (SNEP)	76

== Certifications ==
Region	Certification	Certified units/sales
New Zealand (RMNZ)	Gold	15,000^{‡}
United Kingdom (BPI)	Gold	400,000^{‡}
United States (RIAA)	2× Platinum	2,000,000^{^}
^{^} Shipments figures based on certification alone.^{‡} Sales+streaming figures based on certification alone.

== Beatles versions ==
According to biographer Mark Lewisohn in The Complete Beatles Chronicle, the Beatles (first as the Quarrymen) regularly performed the song, from 1957 through 1960 (possibly later) with Paul McCartney on lead vocal. There is no known recorded version from that time. However, Len Garry of the Quarrymen (in his book John, Paul & Me) states that it was one of the songs the group played on July 6, 1957, the day John Lennon met Paul McCartney and that the song was recorded then (but was erased later).

Author Doug Sulpy (in Drugs, Divorce and a Slipping Image) adds that on January 13, 1969, during the "Get Back" sessions, they did record a "spirited" version of it with McCartney and George Harrison sharing vocals. Lennon did not join in the recording, as he was sitting watching while having tea. That version of the song remains officially unreleased (due to it being in mono and McCartney and Harrison not remembering all the lyrics by that late date). In 1999, McCartney cut a hard-rocking version on the album Run Devil Run, while his surviving Quarrymen bandmates recorded it in 2004 on Songs We Remember.

== Billy Joel version ==
"All Shook Up"

Single by Billy Joel

from the album Honeymoon in Vegas
- B-side: "Wear My Ring Around Your Neck"; "Surrender"
- Released: 1992
- Genre: Rock
- Length: 2:09
- Label: Epic
- Songwriters: Otis Blackwell, Elvis Presley

Billy Joel singles chronology
"Shameless" (1991)	"All Shook Up" (1992)	"The River of Dreams" (1993)

In 1991, Billy Joel recorded the song for the movie Honeymoon in Vegas, which also featured other Elvis Presley songs by various artists. It was released as a single and peaked at No. 92 in the US and No. 27 in the UK.

=== Chart positions ===
Chart (1992)	Peak position
Australian Singles Chart	54
Canada Top Singles (RPM)	28
French Singles Chart	60
German Media Control Charts	52
Irish Singles Chart	23
New Zealand (Recorded Music NZ)	26
UK Singles (Official Charts)	27
UK Airplay (Music Week)	22
US Billboard Hot 100	92
US Adult Contemporary (Billboard)	15

== Other recordings and notable performances ==
- Suzi Quatro recorded the song for her debut solo album Suzi Quatro in 1973 (titled Can the Can in Australia). Her recording of the song was released as a single in 1974 and peaked at number 85 on the Billboard Hot 100. Presley invited Quatro to Graceland, commenting that her version was the best since the original. Quatro declined the offer.
- A version by English DJ and producer Adamski titled "The Space Jungle" was released in 1990 on the album Doctor Adamski's Musical Pharmacy and was a hit across Europe, peaking in the top 10 of the Finnish and UK charts, as well as on the U.S. Billboard dance chart at No. 8.
- The Jeff Beck Group recorded the song for their 1969 studio album, Beck-Ola, featuring Rod Stewart on vocals, Jeff Beck on guitars, Nicky Hopkins on piano, Ronnie Wood on bass, and Tony Newman on drums.

== See also ==
- List of Billboard number-one singles of 1957
- List of Billboard number-one rhythm and blues hits
- Billboard year-end top 50 singles of 1957
- List of Cash Box Best Sellers number-one singles of 1957
- List of CHUM number-one singles of 1957
- Preseucoela imallshookupis
