= Bambino (song) =

- The second, most widely distributed, version of the EP cover

Song by Dalida
- Language: French
- Released: October 28, 1956
- Recorded: 1956
- Studio: Hoche
- Genre: Chanson; traditional pop
- Length: 3:32
- Label: Barclay
- Composer: Giuseppe Fanciulli
- Lyricist: Jacques Larue

Alternative cover
- The less distributed first version of the EP cover, which carried the same image as the previous two EPs and was sold under the name Vol. 3

Audio sample
- file; help

"Bambino" (Italian for "Little Boy" or "Child") is a song recorded by Italian-French singer Dalida that became her first major hit. It was first released on 28 October 1956 as the title song of her third EP, prior to her debut album Son nom est Dalida, where it was also included. It is a French version of the Neapolitan song "Guaglione".

"Bambino" spent 45 weeks atop the French song charts, becoming the longest-running number one song in world history. It also topped the charts of several other countries and was subsequently performed in Arabic language by Jean Dujardin, in the 2006 comedy film OSS 117: Cairo, Nest of Spies.

== Charts ==
Chart (1957–1958)	Peak position
Quebec	1
Wallonia	1
France	1
Flanders	5

== Bibliography ==
- L'argus Dalida: Discographie mondiale et cotations, by Daniel Lesueur, Éditions Alternatives, 2004. ISBN 2-86227-428-3 and ISBN 978-2-86227-428-7. (in French)
