= Piano Concerto No. 3 (Villa-Lobos) =

- Concerto by Heitor Villa-Lobos
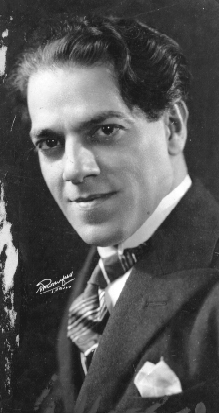
- Heitor Villa-Lobos
- Catalogue: W512
- Composed: 1952–1957: Rio de Janeiro, New York
- Dedication: Arnaldo Estrella
- Published: 1984: Paris (reduction for two pianos)
- Publisher: Max Eschig
- Recorded: June 1984 Fernando Lopes, piano; Orquestra Sinfônica Municipal de Campinas; conducted by Benito Juarez. Released as part of a 4-LP set of the five Villa-Lobos Piano Concertos, Energia de São Paulo LPVL 01/25 – LPVL 04/25.
- Duration: 26 min
- Movements: Four
- Scoring: piano; orchestra

Premiere
- Date: 24 August 1957
- Location: Theatro Municipal, Rio de Janeiro
- Conductor: Eleazar de Carvalho
- Performers: Arnaldo Estrella; Orchestra Sinfônica do Theatro Municipal

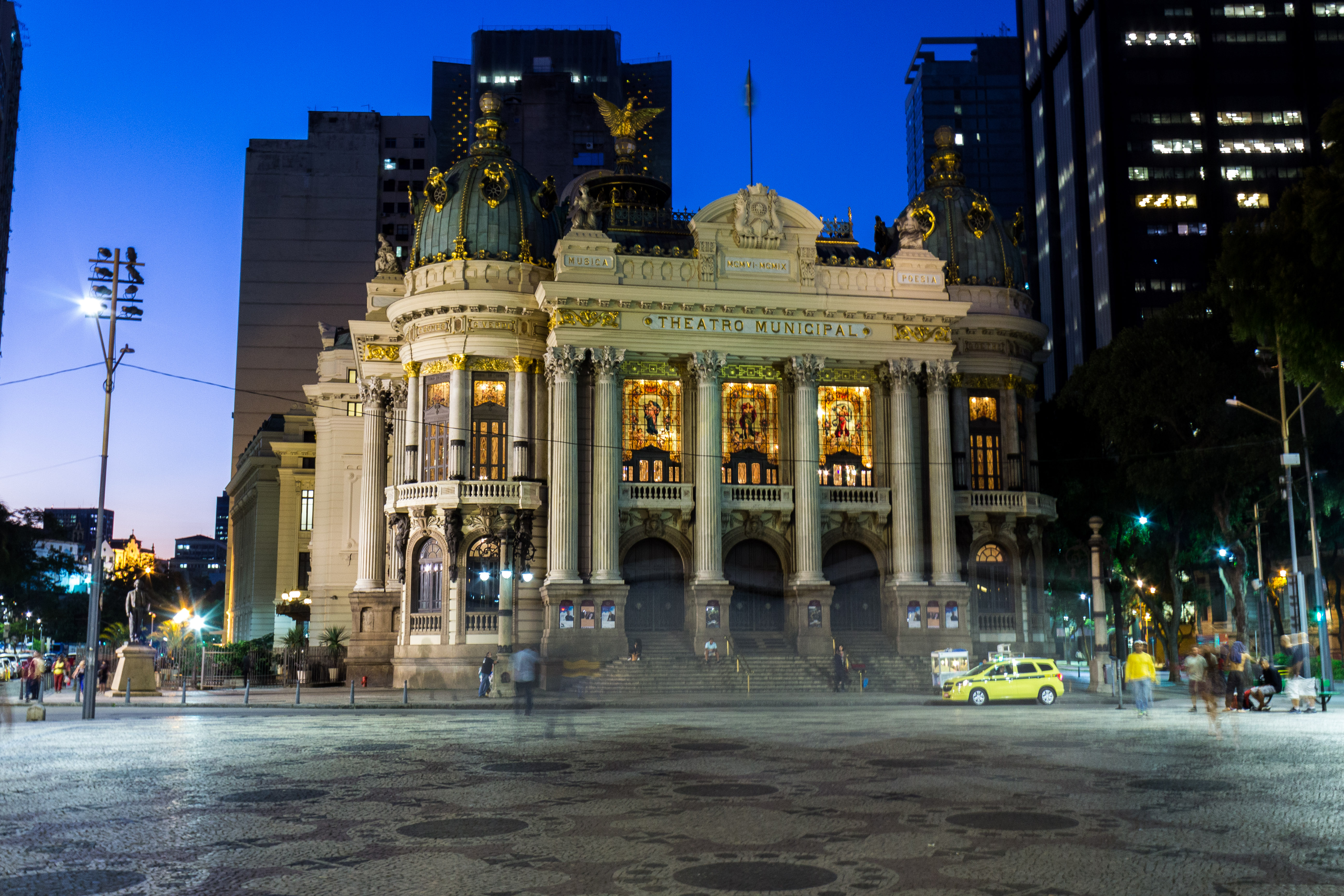
Theatro Municipal, Rio de Janeiro, venue of the concerto's premiere

The Piano Concerto No. 3, W512, is a composition for piano and orchestra by the Brazilian composer Heitor Villa-Lobos, written in 1952–57.

Villa-Lobos began composing the Third Concerto in Rio de Janeiro in 1952, but interrupted work in favour of other commissions, completing it in New York only in 1957, five years after composing the Fourth Concerto and three years after completing the Fifth Concerto. It was first performed on 24 August 1957 at the Theatro Municipal in Rio de Janeiro, by Arnaldo Estrella (to whom the score is dedicated), and the Orquestra Sinfônica Brasileira; conducted by Eleazar de Carvalho.

A typical performance lasts about 26 minutes.

== Instrumentation ==
The work is scored for solo piano and an orchestra consisting of piccolo, 2 flutes, 2 oboes, cor anglais, 2 clarinets, bass clarinet, 2 bassoons, contrabassoon, 4 horns, 2 trumpets, 2 trombones, tuba, percussion (timpani, tam-tam, cymbal, and vibraphone), celesta, harp, and strings.

== Analysis ==
The concerto has four movements:

1. Allegro non troppo
2. Andante con moto
3. Scherzo (Vivace) – Cadenza
4. Allegro vivace (decisivo)

The transparent, Aeolian main theme of the first movement recalls the openings of some of Sergei Prokofiev's concertos as well as Béla Bartók's Third Piano Concerto. In general, the concerto is athematic, avoiding characteristic melodies. The slow movement is an exception, with lyrical, clear themes.

== Discography ==
- Heitor Villa-Lobos: 5 concertos para piano e orquestra. Fernando Lopes, piano; Orquestra Sinfônica Municipal de Campinas; conducted by Benito Juarez. Recorded 18–24 June 1984, in the Teatro Interno do Centro de Covivência Cultural da Campinas. LP recording, 4 discs: 12 inch, 33⅓ rpm, stereo. Energia de São Paulo: LPVL 01/25 – LPVL 04/25. São Paulo: Energia de São Paulo, [1984?].
- Heitor Villa-Lobos: Five Piano Concertos. Cristina Ortiz, piano; Royal Philharmonic Orchestra, conducted by Miguel Ángel Gómez Martínez. Recorded at the Walthamstow Assembly Hall in October 1989, January and July 1990. 2-CD set: stereo. London 430 628-2 (430 629-2 and 430 630–2). London: The Decca Record Company Limited, 1992.
- Heitor Villa-Lobos: Cinco Conciertos para Piano y Orquesta. Elvira Santiago, piano (Concerto No. 1); Ulises Hernández, piano (Concerto No. 2); Patricio Malcolm, piano (Concerto No. 3); Harold López-Nussa, piano (Concerto No. 4); Roberto Urbay, piano (Concerto No. 5); Orquesta Sinfónica Nacional de Cuba, conducted by Enrique Pérez Mesa. Concerto No. 3 recorded at the Teatro Auditorium Amadeo Roldán, Havana, Cuba, 10 December 2003, as part of the XXV Festival Internacional del Nuevo Cine Latinoamericano. 2 CDs + 1 DVD. Colibrí DVD/CD 050. Havana: Colibrí, 2006.
