= Dedicated to You (The "5" Royales album) =

Studio album by The "5" Royales
- Released: 1957
- Genre: R&B
- Label: King Records

The "5" Royales chronology
The Rockin' 5 Royales (1956)	Dedicated to You (1957)	Five Royales Sing for You (1959)

Professional ratings
Review scores
Source	Rating
Allmusic	4.5/5 stars

Dedicated to You is a 1957 album by the R&B band, The "5" Royales.

== Track listing ==
1. "Think"
2. "Someone Made You for Me"
3. "Just as I Am"
4. "Don't Be Ashamed"
5. "Come On and Save Me"
6. "I'd Better Make a Move"
7. "Dedicated to the One I Love"
8. "Right Around the Corner"
9. "Say It"
10. "Messin' Up"
11. "Tears of Joy"
12. "Thirty Second Lover"
