= Party Doll =

Single by Buddy Knox

from the album Buddy Knox
- B-side: "My Baby's Gone"
- Released: 1957
- Recorded: 1956
- Studio: Norman Petty Recording Studios (Clovis, New Mexico)
- Genre: Rockabilly, rock and roll
- Length: 2:12
- Label: Roulette
- Songwriters: Buddy Knox; Jimmy Bowen
- Producer: Norman Petty

Buddy Knox singles chronology
"Party Doll" (1957)	"Rock Your Little Baby to Sleep" (1957)

"Party Doll" is a 1957 rock 'n' roll song written by Buddy Knox and Jimmy Bowen. It was performed by Buddy Knox with the Rhythm Orchids, recorded in April 1956, and it became a hit on the Roulette label.

== Background ==
Buddy Knox was a teenager living near Happy, Texas, in 1947 when he wrote the original verses of "Party Doll" behind a haystack on his family farm. While attending college at West Texas State University, he and two college friends, Jimmy Bowen and Don Lanier, traveled to Clovis, New Mexico, to record the song at Norman Petty Recording Studios. Knox's sister and two of her friends, Iraene Potts of Amarillo and a neighbor, sang background vocals on the song and a girl from the marching band of Clovis High School was recruited to play cymbal. After pressing copies of the record on the Triple D label, a DJ in Amarillo began playing "Party Doll" in 1956 and it soon became a regional hit. After being contacted by Roulette Records in New York City, the song was distributed around the U.S. and became a chart-topping hit, spending a week at No. 1 on the Top 100 chart, the precursor to the Billboard Hot 100, in March 1957. In Canada, the first issue of the CHUM Chart had the song at No.17 on May 27, 1957 Jerry Allison, drummer for The Crickets (who also recorded for Petty at Clovis), stated in an interview that the drum on Party Doll (which he said was played on a cardboard box) was the inspiration for the drum sound he used for "Not Fade Away".

== Cover versions ==
- Almost immediately after Roulette released Knox's version, competing renditions of "Party Doll" were recorded and released by other record labels. Wingy Manone and Roy Brown recorded R&B versions which saw some success.
- A less rock and roll version by singer Steve Lawrence (with Dick Jacobs conducting the orchestra) also became a pop hit that year, reaching No. 5 on the Billboard Top 100. Lawrence's take was released on the Coral label.
- The Crests - for their 1960 album, The Crests Sing All Biggies.
- The Fleetwoods.
- Ronnie Dove, several years before he became a star, recorded the song in 1961 with his band, the Bell Tones, for Decca Records.
- It was also one of several rock and roll standards recorded by Lindisfarne on their 1987 party album C'mon Everybody, and released as a single.

== In popular culture ==
- Knox's version was included on the soundtrack to the 1973 film American Graffiti.
