= Buddy Knox =

American singer-songwriter (1933–1999)

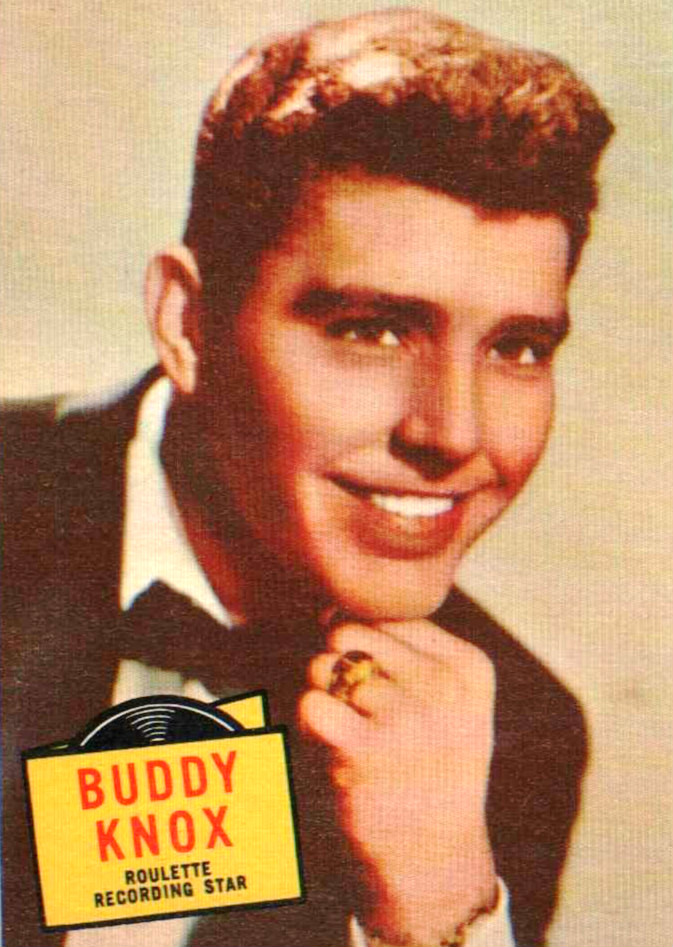
- Knox in 1957.

Background information
- Born: Buddy Wayne Knox; July 20, 1933; Happy, Texas, U.S.
- Died: February 14, 1999 (aged 65) Bremerton, Washington, U.S.
- Genres: Rock and roll, rockabilly, pop
- Occupations: Singer, songwriter
- Instruments: Vocals, guitar
- Years active: 1955–1992
- Labels: Triple-D Records; Roulette Records; Liberty Records; United Artists Records

Buddy Wayne Knox (July 20, 1933 – February 14, 1999) was an American singer-songwriter, best known for his 1957 rock and roll hit song, "Party Doll".

== Early life ==
Knox was born on July 20, 1933, in the tiny farming community of Happy, Texas, United States, and learned to play the guitar in his youth.

In his teens, he and some high-school friends formed a band called the Rhythm Orchids. After they performed on the same 1956 radio show as fellow Texan Roy Orbison and his Teen Kings band, Orbison suggested that Knox go to record producer Norman Petty, who had a recording studio in Clovis, New Mexico, the same studio where Buddy Holly recorded several of his early hits, including "That'll Be the Day".

== Career ==
Knox's song "Party Doll" was released on the Roulette record label, and went to number one on the Cash Box record chart in 1957 (after being picked from the tiny Triple-D label). It sold over one million copies, and was awarded a gold disc by the Recording Industry Association of America. This success was followed by "Rock Your Little Baby To Sleep", a number-17 hit, and "Hula Love", a number-9 hit. While he never achieved the same level of artistic success as Holly or Orbison, Knox outlived both and enjoyed a long career in music. For his pioneering contribution, Knox was elected to the Rockabilly Hall of Fame. "Party Doll" was voted one of the Rock and Roll Hall of Fame's 500 Songs that Shaped Rock and Roll.

In the early 1960s, Knox signed with Liberty Records and released several more mainstream pop records, featuring string arrangements and backing vocalists. "Lovey Dovey" and "Ling-Ting-Tong" were the most notable recordings from this era. The sound captured on these recordings was a distinct departure from his earlier rockabilly work for Roulette. Liberty and principal record producer Snuff Garrett successfully employed the same production techniques for their other mainstream pop artists of the time, which included Johnny Burnette and Bobby Vee.

In 1968, Knox, who had been living in semiretirement in Macon, Georgia, while running his publishing company, moved to Nashville, Tennessee, and signed a new recording contract with United Artists Records. Working with producer Bob Montgomery, Knox honed his traditional rockabilly style more toward the modern country sound of the day. His first album on United Artists earned him the nickname by which he would be known for the remainder of his life. The title song of the album, Gypsy Man, written by Sonny Curtis and featuring Curtis' acoustic guitar work, received airplay on country music radio stations.

Several singles recorded by Knox between 1968 and 1974 were notable for his experimenting with a variety of sounds and styles, and from a creative and critical standpoint, may have been his most productive era. His version of Delaney Bramlett's "God Knows I Love You", along with his self-penned "Salt Lake City", placed Knox firmly in the midst of the new pop-music genre, being populated by artists such as Delaney & Bonnie, Eric Clapton, and others who were on the leading edge of the developing Southern rock style such as Black Oak Arkansas and the Allman Brothers Band. His cover version of James Hendricks' "Glory Train" was another stylistic stretch and featured a gospel-like chorus of backing vocalists. His cover of the Fleetwoods' "Come Softly to Me" demonstrated a vocal range not heard on his older recordings. He also reached out to the new generation of songwriters who would become prominent during Nashville's "outlaw era" of the 1970s, as he was one of the first artists to record Mickey Newbury's "I'm Only Rockin'". Several other major country music artists later recorded this song, but under the alternate title of "T. Total Tommy". Knox also recorded songs by Alex Harvey, John D. Loudermilk, and Gary Paxton. On several of these recordings, Knox experimented with multitracking, something few artists had done up to that time.

For many years from the 1970s to the 1990s, Knox was based in the small town of Dominion City, Manitoba, Canada, and toured primarily in western Canada and the upper Midwest of the U.S., with occasional European appearances. In 1981 he starred in an independent Canadian movie, Sweet Country Road.

== Personal life ==
Knox said the fame took a toll on his family life. Traveling 250 days a year for 35 years, he was voted "the most traveling entertainer in the world" by Billboard magazine, but he said it cost him three marriages. His wives were Glenda Etheridge (1959-1972), Lee Ann Bowman, and Mitzi Shelby.

His son, Michael Knox, is a record producer.

== Later life and death ==
In 1992, after his last divorce, Knox moved to British Columbia, where he was involved in several business ventures, including a partnership in a local nightclub.

Moving to Port Orchard, Washington, in 1997 to be with his fiancée, Knox injured his hip in a fall. A doctor informed him at that time that he had terminal lung cancer.

Knox died on February 14, 1999, in Bremerton, Washington. He is interred in Dreamland Cemetery, in Canyon, Texas.

== Discography ==
=== Compilation albums ===
Buddy Knox — Greatest Hits — all the Roulette and Liberty recordings

1. "Party Doll" (1957, US number one, UK no. 29)
2. "Storm Clouds" (1957)
3. "That's Why I Cry" (1959, US number 88)
4. "Hula Love" (1957, US number 12)
5. "C'mon Baby" (1959)
6. "All For You" (1959)
7. "I Think I'm Gonna Kill Myself" (1959, US number. 55)
8. "Lovey Dovey" (1961, US number 25)
9. "Ling-Ting-Tong" (1961, US number 65)
10. "Somebody Touched Me" (1958, US number 22)
11. "Rock Your Little Baby to Sleep" (1957)
12. "Cause I'm In Love" (1957)
13. "Swinging Daddy" (1958, US number 80)
14. "The Girl with the Golden Hair" (1959)
15. "Devil Woman" (1957)
16. "Mary Lou" (1957)
17. "Rock House" (1957)
18. "Maybelline" (1957)
19. "Rock Around the Clock" (1957)
20. "She's Gone" (1962, UK number 45)
21. "Slippin' and Slidin'" (1962)
22. "Chi-Hua-Hua" (1962)
23. "Open Your Lovin' Arms" (1962)
24. "Dear Abby" (1962)
25. "Three Eyed Man" (1962)
26. "Tomorrow is a Comin'" (1963)
27. "Hitch Hike Back To Georgia" (1963)
28. "I Got You" (1960)
29. "I Ain't Sharin' Sharon" (1959)
30. "I'm in Love With You" (1957)
31. "Long Lonely Nights" (1960)
32. "Good Time Girl" (1965)
33. "Livin' in a House Full of Love" (1965)
34. "Love Has Many Ways" (1965)
35. "Teasable, Pleasable You" (1959, US number 85)

=== Singles ===
Year	Titles Both sides from same album except where indicated	Chart positions				Album
Year	Titles Both sides from same album except where indicated	US	US R&B	CAN	UK	Album
1957	"Party Doll" b/w "My Baby's Gone" (Non-album track)	1	3	17	29	Buddy Knox
1957	"Rock Your Little Baby To Sleep" b/w "Don't Make Me Cry"	23	—	12	—	Buddy Knox
1957	"Hula Love" b/w "Devil Woman"	12	13	3	—	Buddy Knox
1958	"Swingin' Daddy" b/w "Whenever I'm Lonely"	80	—	—	—	Non-album tracks
1958	"Somebody Touched Me" b/w "C'mon Baby"	22	—	22	—	Buddy Knox & Jimmy Bowen
1959	"That's Why I Cry" /	88	—	—	—	Buddy Knox & Jimmy Bowen
1959	"Teasable, Pleasable You"	85	—	—	—	Buddy Knox & Jimmy Bowen
1959	"I Think I'm Gonna Kill Myself" b/w "To Be With You"	55	—	—	—	Non-album tracks
1959	"Taste Of The Blues" b/w "I Ain't Sharin' Sharon"	—	—	—	—	Non-album tracks
1960	"Long Lonely Nights" b/w "Storm Clouds"	—	—	—	—	Non-album tracks
1960	"Lovey Dovey" b/w "I Got You" (Non-album track)	25	—	—	—	Buddy Knox's Golden Hits
1961	"Ling, Ting, Tong" b/w "The Kisses (They're All Mine)" (Non-album track)	65	—	—	—	Buddy Knox's Golden Hits
1961	"Three Eyed Man" b/w "All By Myself" (from Buddy Knox's Golden Hits)	—	—	—	—	Non-album track
1962	"Chi-Hua-Hua" b/w "Open Your Lovin' Arms"	—	—	—	—	Buddy Knox's Golden Hits
1962	"She's Gone" b/w "Now There's Only Me" (Non-album track)	—	—	—	45	Buddy Knox's Golden Hits
1962	"Three Way Love Affair" b/w "Dear Abby" (from Buddy Knox's Golden Hits)	—	—	—	—	Non-album tracks
1963	"Tomorrow Is A Comin'" b/w "Shadaroom"	—	—	—	—	Non-album tracks
1963	"Thanks A Lot" b/w "Hitchhike Back To Georgia"	—	—	—	—	Non-album tracks
1964	"Good Lovin'" b/w "All Time Loser"	—	—	—	—	Non-album tracks
1964	"Jo Ann" b/w "Don't Make A Ripple"	—	—	—	—	Non-album tracks
1965	"Good Time Girl" b/w "Livin' In A House Full Of Love"	—	—	—	—	Non-album tracks
1965	"A Lover's Question" b/w "You Said Goodbye"	—	—	—	—	Non-album tracks
1966	"That Don't Do Me No Good" b/w "A White Sport Coat (and A Pink Carnation)"	—	—	—	—	Non-album tracks
1966	"Sixteen Feet Of Patio" b/w "Love Has Many Ways"	—	—	—	—	Non-album tracks
1968	"Gypsy Man"^{A} b/w "This Time Tomorrow"	—	—	—	—	Gypsy Man
1968	"Today My Sleepless Nights Came Back To Town" b/w "A Million Years Or So"	—	—	—	—	Gypsy Man
1969	"God Knows I Love You" b/w "Night Runners" (from Gypsy Man)	—	—	—	—	Non-album tracks
1969	"Salt Lake City" b/w "I'm Only Rockin'"	—	—	—	—	Non-album tracks
1970	"Back To New Orleans" b/w "Yesterday Is Gone"	—	—	—	—	Non-album tracks
1970	"Glory Train" b/w "White Dove"	—	—	—	—	Non-album tracks
1971	"Travelin' Light" b/w "Come Softly To Me"	—	—	—	—	Non-album tracks

- ^{A}"Gypsy Man" peaked at number 64 on a Billboard country chart
