= Mean Woman Blues =

1957 song by Elvis Presley

Song by Elvis Presley

from the album Loving You
- Released: June 20, 1957
- Recorded: January 13, 1957
- Studio: Radio Recorders, Hollywood, California
- Genre: Rock and roll
- Length: 2:17
- Label: RCA Victor
- Songwriter: Claude Demetrius

Elvis Presley singles chronology
"(Let Me Be Your) Teddy Bear" (1957)	"Mean Woman Blues" (1957)	"Loving You" (1957)

"Mean Woman Blues" is a rock and roll song written by Claude Demetrius. Elvis Presley recorded it for the soundtrack of the 1957 film, Loving You. In an album review for AllMusic, Bruce Eder described it as "some powerful rock & roll ... which could almost have passed for one of his Sun tracks".

When the song was released as part of an EP package called Loving You Vol. II (RCA EPA 2–1515) it hit number 11 on Billboard magazine's "Most Played R&B by Jockeys" chart.

== Roy Orbison rendition ==
"Mean Woman Blues"
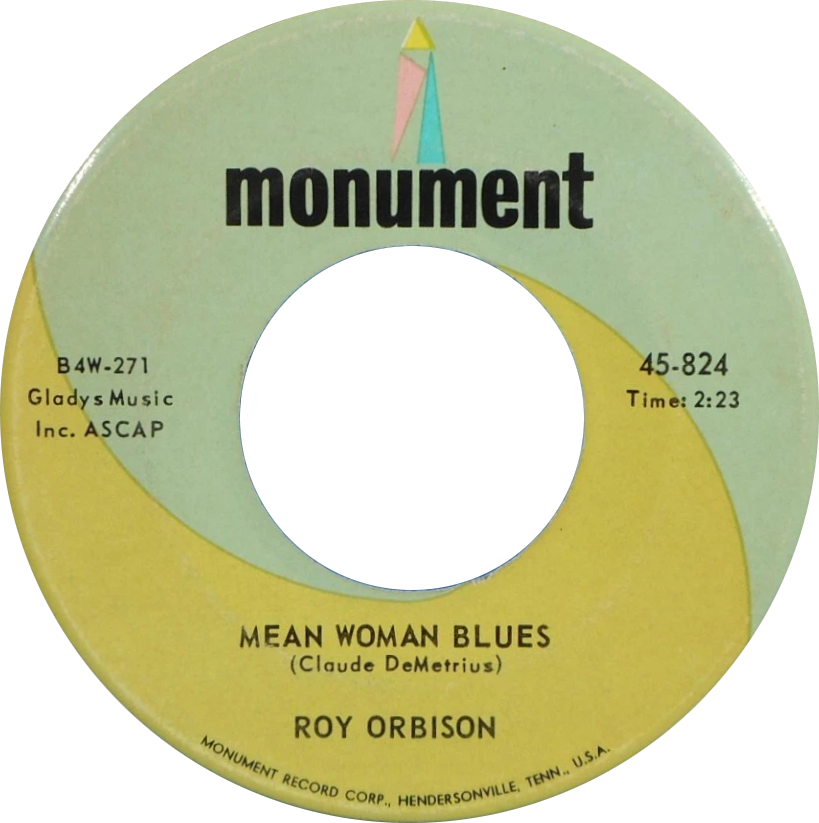
- Side A of the US single

Single by Roy Orbison
- A-side: "Blue Bayou"
- Released: August 1, 1963
- Recorded: April 29, 1963
- Genre: Rock and roll
- Length: 2:25
- Label: Monument
- Songwriter: Claude Demetrius

Roy Orbison recorded "Mean Woman Blues" on April 29, 1963, which was released as a single with "Blue Bayou". It peaked at number five on the Billboard Hot 100 singles chart.
