= The Blue Moon Boys =

American rock and roll band

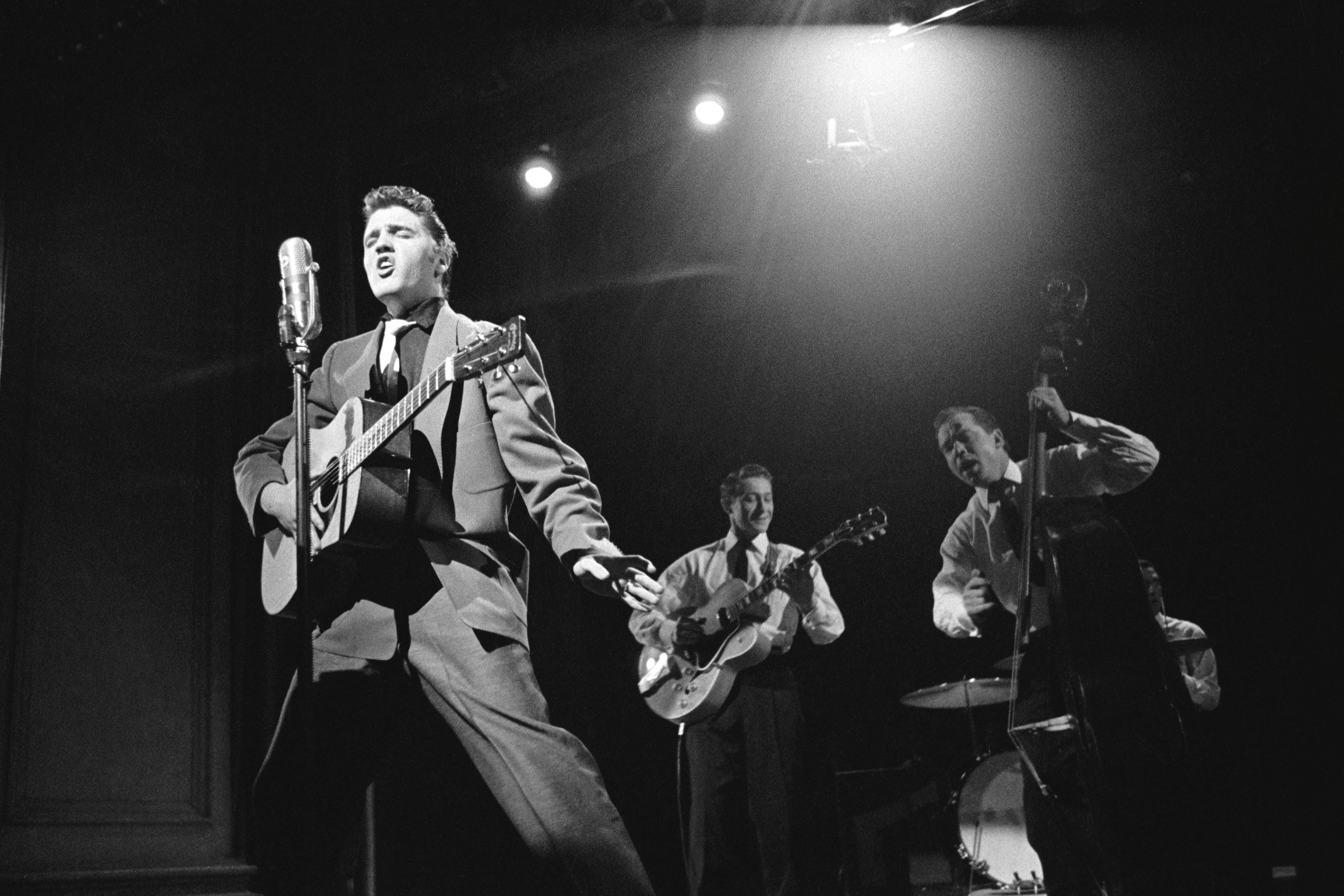
- Elvis Presley, Scotty Moore, Bill Black (from left to right) in 1956

Background information
- Origin: Memphis, Tennessee, United States
- Genres: Rock and roll; rockabilly; country; rhythm and blues; blues
- Years active: 1954–1968
- Labels: Sun, RCA Victor
- Past members: Elvis Presley; Scotty Moore; Bill Black; D. J. Fontana

The Blue Moon Boys were an American rock and roll band that was formed by Elvis Presley, lead guitarist Scotty Moore and double bass player Bill Black. The group members were introduced by Sun Studio owner Sam Phillips in 1954, except for drummer D.J. Fontana, who joined the group during a Louisiana Hayride tour in 1955. The Blue Moon Boys were inducted into the Musicians Hall of Fame and Museum in 2007. The band was named after Bill Monroe's song "Blue Moon of Kentucky".

== Career ==
=== 1953–1956: First recordings ===
==== Sam Phillips and Sun Records ====
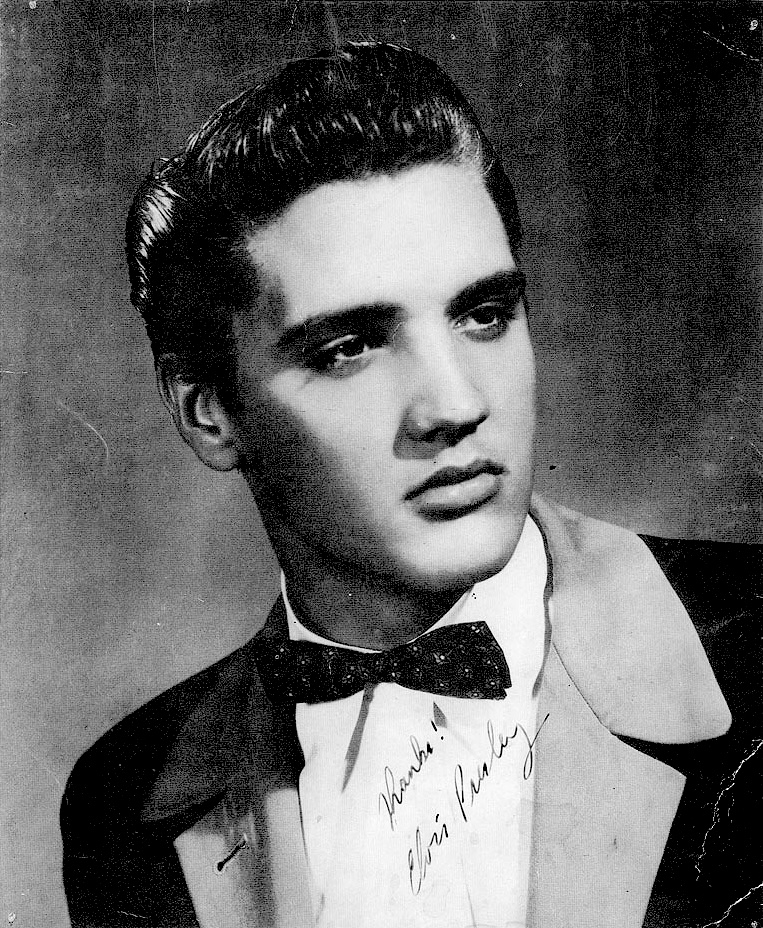
Presley in a Sun Records promotional photograph, 1954

In August 1953,, Presley checked into Memphis Recording Service, the company run by Sam Phillips before he started Sun Records. He aimed to pay for studio time to record a two-sided acetate disc: "My Happiness" and "That's When Your Heartaches Begin". He later claimed that he intended the record as a birthday gift for his mother, or that he was merely interested in what he "sounded like". Biographer Peter Guralnick argued that Presley chose Sun in the hope of being discovered. Phillips was not there, so Presley's recording was produced and engineered by his secretary, Marion Keisker, who kept a demo copy of the recording In January 1954, Presley cut a second acetate at Sun—"I'll Never Stand in Your Way" and "It Wouldn't Be the Same Without You"—but again nothing came of it. Not long after, he failed an audition for a local vocal quartet, the Songfellows, and another for the band of Eddie Bond.

Phillips, meanwhile, was always on the lookout for someone who could bring to a broader audience the sound of the black musicians on whom Sun focused. At Phillips' behest, Keisker called Presley for an appointment at the studio almost a year later; he returned on June 26, 1954.

In June, he acquired a demo recording by Jimmy Sweeney of a ballad, "Without You", that he thought might suit Presley. The teenaged singer came by the studio but was unable to do it justice. Despite this, Phillips asked Presley to sing other numbers and was sufficiently affected by what he heard to invite two local musicians, guitarist Winfield "Scotty" Moore and double bassist player Bill Black of the local country music band the Starlight Wranglers, to work with Presley for a recording session. The session, held the evening of July 5, proved entirely unfruitful until late in the night. As they were about to give up and go home, Presley launched into a 1946 blues number, Arthur Crudup's "That's All Right". Moore recalled, "All of a sudden, Elvis just started singing this song, jumping around and acting the fool, and then Bill picked up his bass, and he started acting the fool, too, and I started playing with them." Phillips quickly began taping; this was the sound he had been looking for. Three days later, popular Memphis disc jockey Dewey Phillips (no relation) played "That's All Right" on his Red, Hot, and Blue show. Listener interest was such that Phillips played the record repeatedly during the remaining two hours of his show. Interviewing Presley on-air, (Dewey) Phillips asked him what high school he attended to clarify his color for the many callers who had assumed that he was black. During the next few days, the trio recorded a bluegrass song, Bill Monroe's "Blue Moon of Kentucky", again in a distinctive style and employing a jury-rigged echo effect that Sam Phillips dubbed "slapback". A single was pressed with "That's All Right" on the A-side and "Blue Moon of Kentucky" on the reverse.

==== Early live performances and RCA Victor contract ====
The trio played publicly for the first time at the Bon Air club on July 17, 1954. Later that month, they appeared at the Overton Park Shell, with Slim Whitman headlining. Here Elvis pioneered "Rubber legs", his signature dance movement. A combination of his strong response to rhythm and nervousness led Presley to shake his legs as he performed: His wide-cut pants emphasized his movements, causing young women in the audience to start screaming. Moore recalled, "During the instrumental parts, he would back off from the mic and be playing and shaking, and the crowd would just go wild."

Scotty Moore briefly became the manager of the band, and they toured several cities in the south, the three members still working at their regular employments when not touring. Both Moore and Black focused more on the group after they let Presley perform at the regular Starlight Wranglers show on the Bon Air club, where the reception of the audience was unfavorable, and led to animosity between them and the other members of the group for having to leave the stage.

Soon after, Moore and Black left their band to play with Presley regularly, and disc jockey/promoter Bob Neal became the trio's manager. From August through October, they played frequently at the Eagle's Nest club, a dance venue in Memphis. When Presley played, teenagers rushed from the pool to fill the club, then left again as the house western swing band resumed. Presley quickly grew more confident on stage. According to Moore, "His movement was a natural thing, but he was also very conscious of what got a reaction. He'd do something one time and then he would expand on it real quick." Amid these live performances, Presley returned to Sun studio for more recording sessions. Presley made what would be his only appearance on Nashville's Grand Ole Opry on October 2; Opry manager Jim Denny told Phillips that his singer was "not bad" but did not suit the program.

==== Louisiana Hayride, radio commercial, and first television performances ====
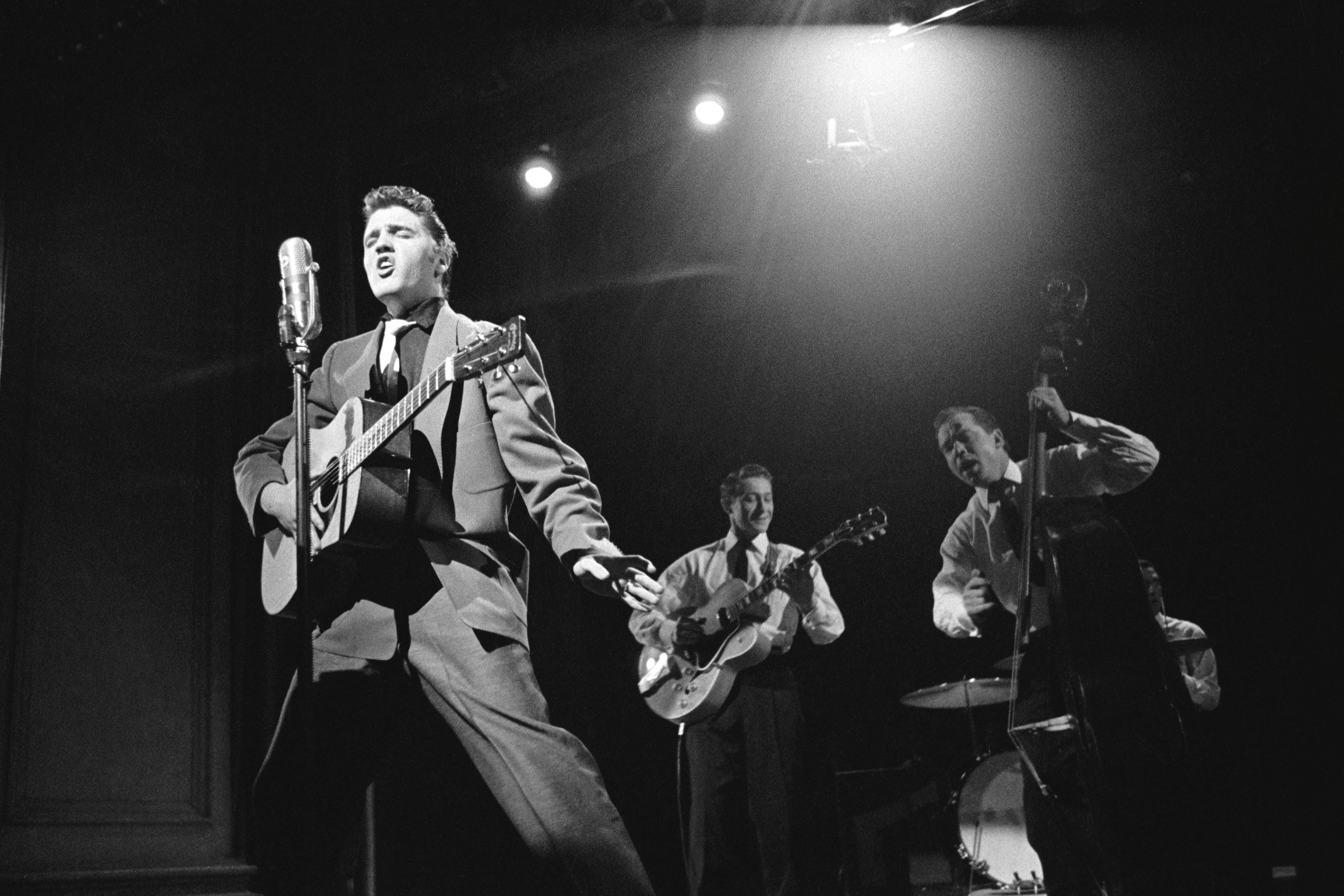
Presley performing with Scotty Moore and Bill Black in 1956

In October or November 1954, the band made their first performance on the Louisiana Hayride—the Opry's chief, and more adventurous, rival. The show aired on 198 radio stations in 28 states. His nervous first set drew a muted reaction. A more composed and energetic second set inspired an enthusiastic response. Soon after the show, the Hayride engaged Presley for a year's worth of Saturday-night appearances. Trading in his old guitar for $8, he purchased a Martin instrument for $175 (equivalent to $2,100 in 2025) and his trio began playing in new locales, including Houston, Texas, and Texarkana, Arkansas. Presley made his first television appearance on the KSLA-TV broadcast of Louisiana Hayride. Soon after, he failed an audition for Arthur Godfrey's Talent Scouts on the CBS television network. By early 1955, Presley's regular Hayride appearances, constant touring, and well-received record releases had made him a regional star.

In January, Neal signed a formal management contract with Presley and brought him to the attention of Colonel Tom Parker, whom he considered the best promoter in the music business. Having successfully managed the top country star Eddy Arnold, Parker was working with the new number-one country singer, Hank Snow. Parker booked Presley on Snow's February tour.

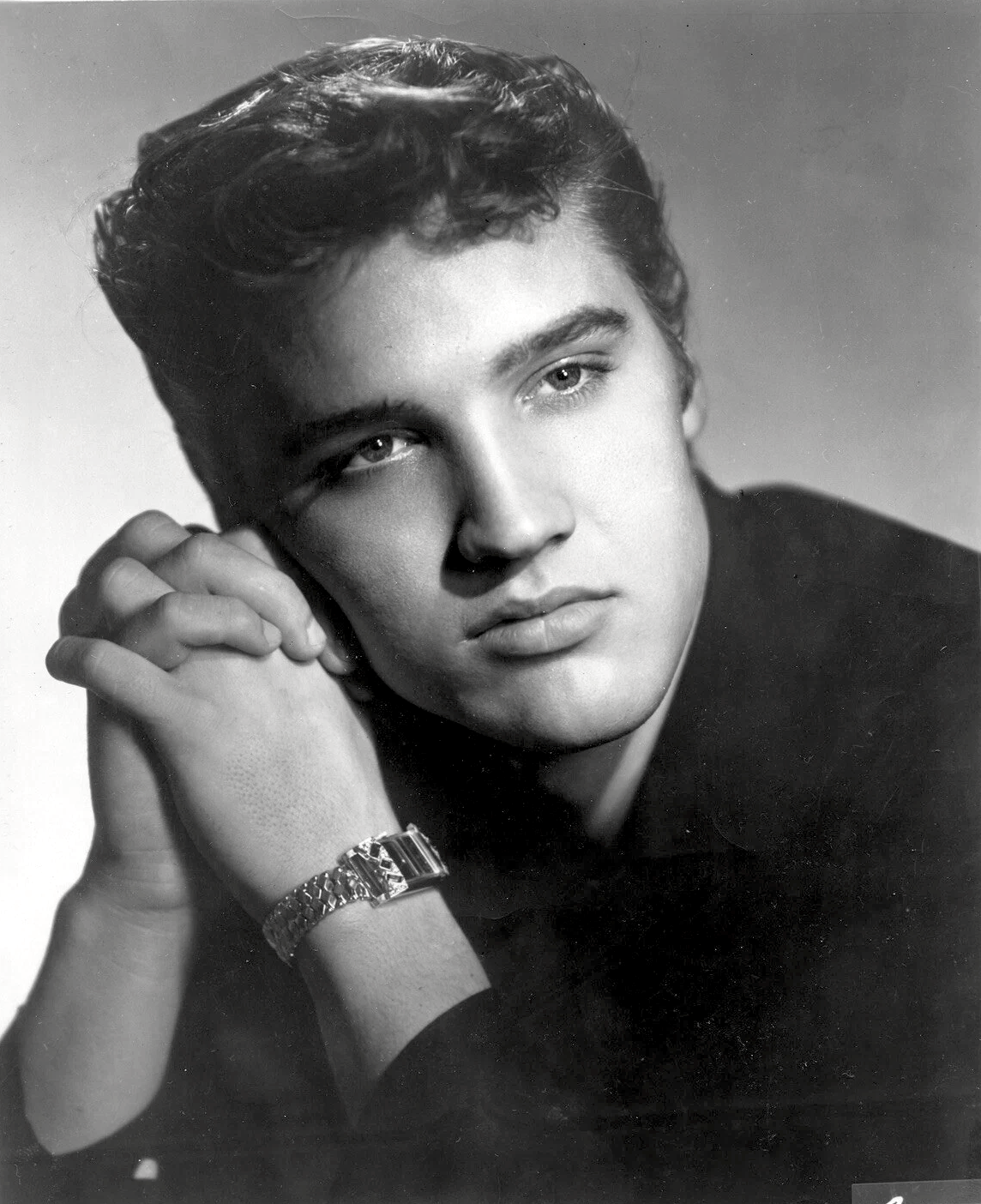
Presley in a 1955 promotional photograph

By August, Sun had released 10 sides credited to "Elvis Presley, Scotty and Bill"; the latest recordings included a drummer. Some of the songs, like "That's All Right", were in what one Memphis journalist described as the "R&B idiom of negro field jazz"; others, like "Blue Moon of Kentucky", were "more in the country field", "but there was a curious blending of the two different musics in both". This blend of styles made it difficult for Presley's music to find radio airplay. According to Neal, many country-music disc jockeys would not play it because Presley sounded too much like a black artist and none of the R&B stations would touch him because "he sounded too much like a hillbilly." The blend came to be known as "rockabilly". At the time, Presley was billed as "The King of Western Bop", "The Hillbilly Cat", and "The Memphis Flash".

Presley renewed Neal's management contract in August 1955, simultaneously appointing Parker as his special adviser. The group maintained an extensive touring schedule. Neal recalled, "It was almost frightening, the reaction that came to Elvis from the teenaged boys. So many of them, through some sort of jealousy, would practically hate him. There were occasions in some towns in Texas when we'd have to be sure to have a police guard because somebody'd always try to take a crack at him." The trio became a quartet when Hayride drummer Fontana joined as a full member in August 1955. In mid-October, they played a few shows in support of Bill Haley, whose "Rock Around the Clock" track had been a number-one hit the previous year. Haley observed that Presley had a natural feel for rhythm, and advised him to sing fewer ballads.

At the Country Disc Jockey Convention in early November, Presley was voted the year's most promising male artist. After three major labels made offers of up to $25,000, Parker and Phillips struck a deal with RCA Victor on November 21 to acquire Presley's Sun contract for an unprecedented $40,000. (Note: Of the $40,000, $5,000 covered back royalties owed by Sun.) Presley, aged 20, was legally still a minor, so his father signed the contract. By December, RCA had begun to heavily promote its new singer, and before month's end had reissued many of his Sun recordings.

=== 1956–1958: Commercial breakout and controversy ===
==== First national TV appearances and debut album ====
On January 10, 1956, Presley made his first recordings for RCA Victor in Nashville. Extending his by-now customary backup of Moore, Black, Fontana, and Hayride pianist Floyd Cramer—who had been performing at live club dates with Presley—RCA Victor enlisted guitarist Chet Atkins and three background singers, including Gordon Stoker of the popular Jordanaires quartet. The session produced the moody "Heartbreak Hotel", released as a single on January 27. Parker brought Presley to national television, booking him on CBS' Stage Show for six appearances over two months. The program, produced in New York City, was hosted on alternate weeks by big band leaders and brothers Tommy and Jimmy Dorsey. After his first appearance on January 28, Presley stayed in town to record at RCA Victor's New York studio. The sessions yielded eight songs, including a cover of Carl Perkins' rockabilly anthem "Blue Suede Shoes". In February, Presley's "I Forgot to Remember to Forget", a Sun recording released the previous August, reached the top of the Billboard country chart. Neal's contract was terminated and Parker became Presley's manager.

RCA Victor released Presley's self-titled debut album on March 23. Joined by five previously unreleased Sun recordings, its seven recently recorded tracks included two country songs, a bouncy pop tune, and what would centrally define the evolving sound of rock and roll: "Blue Suede Shoes"—"an improvement over Perkins' in almost every way", according to critic Robert Hilburn—and three R&B numbers that had been part of Presley's stage repertoire, covers of Little Richard, Ray Charles, and The Drifters. As described by Hilburn, these

were the most revealing of all. Unlike many white artists ... who watered down the gritty edges of the original R&B versions of songs in the '50s, Presley reshaped them. He not only injected the tunes with his own vocal character but also made guitar, not piano, the lead instrument in all three cases.

It became the first rock and roll album to top the Billboard chart, a position it held for ten weeks. While Presley was not an innovative guitarist like Moore or contemporary African American rockers Bo Diddley and Chuck Berry, cultural historian Gilbert B. Rodman argued that the album's cover image, "of Elvis having the time of his life on stage with a guitar in his hands played a crucial role in positioning the guitar ... as the instrument that best captured the style and spirit of this new music."

==== Milton Berle Show and "Hound Dog" ====
On April 3, Presley made the first of two appearances on NBC's The Milton Berle Show. His performance, on the deck of the USS Hancock in San Diego, California, prompted cheers and screams from an audience of sailors and their dates. A few days later, Presley and his band were flying to Nashville, Tennessee, for a recording session when an engine died and the plane almost went down over Arkansas. Twelve weeks after its original release, "Heartbreak Hotel" became Presley's first number-one pop hit. In late April, Presley began a two-week residency at the New Frontier Hotel and Casino on the Las Vegas Strip. The shows were poorly received by the conservative, middle-aged hotel guests, "like a jug of corn liquor at a champagne party", a Newsweek critic wrote. Amid his Vegas tenure, Presley, who had acting ambitions, signed a seven-year contract with Paramount Pictures. He began a tour of the Midwest in mid-May, covering 15 cities in as many days. He had attended several shows by Freddie Bell and the Bellboys in Vegas and was struck by their cover of "Hound Dog", a hit in 1953 for blues singer Big Mama Thornton by songwriters Jerry Leiber and Mike Stoller. It became his new closing number.

Left to right: Scotty Moore (guitar), Bill Black (double bass), D.J. Fontana (drums)

Presley's second Milton Berle Show appearance came on June 5 at NBC's Hollywood studio, amid another hectic tour. Milton Berle persuaded Presley to leave his guitar backstage. During the performance, Presley abruptly halted an up-tempo rendition of "Hound Dog" and launched into a slow, grinding version accentuated with exaggerated body movements. His gyrations created a storm of controversy. Jack Gould of The New York Times wrote,

Mr. Presley has no discernible singing ability. ... His phrasing, if it can be called that, consists of the stereotyped variations that go with a beginner's aria in a bathtub. ... His one specialty is an accented movement of the body ... primarily identified with the repertoire of the blond bombshells of the burlesque runway.

Ben Gross of the New York Daily News opined that popular music "has reached its lowest depths in the 'grunt and groin' antics of one Elvis Presley. ... Elvis, who rotates his pelvis ... gave an exhibition that was suggestive and vulgar, tinged with the kind of animalism that should be confined to dives and bordellos". Ed Sullivan, whose variety show was the nation's most popular, declared Presley "unfit for family viewing". To Presley's displeasure, he soon found himself being referred to as "Elvis the Pelvis", which he called "childish".

==== Steve Allen Show and first Sullivan appearance ====
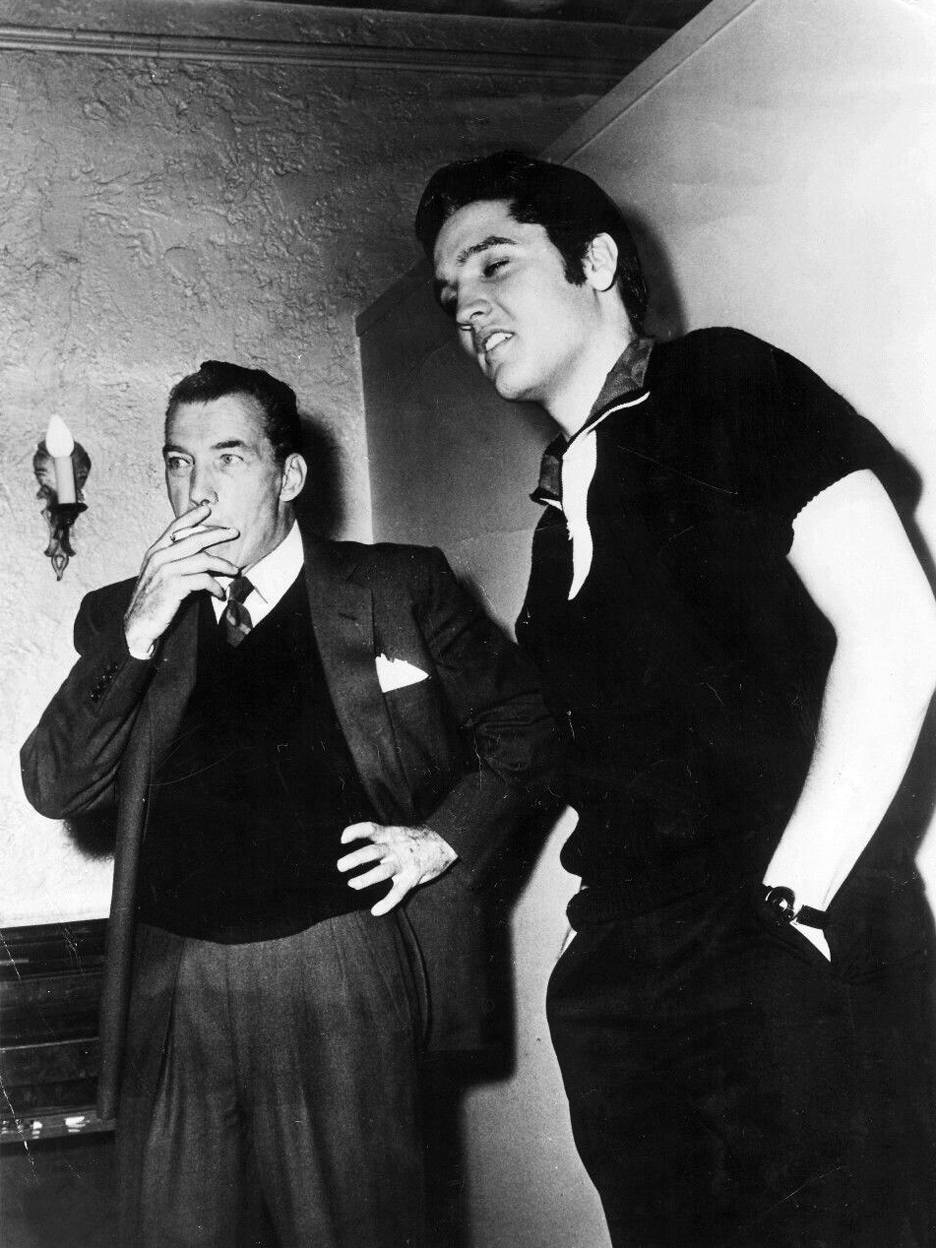
Ed Sullivan and Presley during rehearsals for his second appearance on The Ed Sullivan Show, October 26, 1956

The Berle shows drew such high ratings that Presley was booked for a July 1 appearance on NBC's The Steve Allen Show in New York. Allen, who was no fan of rock and roll, introduced a "new Elvis" in a white bowtie and black tails. Presley sang "Hound Dog" for less than a minute to a Basset Hound wearing a top hat and bowtie. As described by television historian Jake Austen, "Allen thought Presley was talentless and absurd ... [he] set things up so that Presley would show his contrition". Allen later wrote that he found Presley's "strange, gangly, country-boy charisma, his hard-to-define cuteness, and his charming eccentricity intriguing" and worked him into the "comedy fabric" of his program. Just before the final rehearsal for the show, Presley told a reporter, "I don't want to do anything to make people dislike me. I think TV is important so I'm going to go along, but I won't be able to give the kind of show I do in a personal appearance." Presley would refer back to the Allen show as the most ridiculous performance of his career.

The next day, Presley recorded "Hound Dog", "Any Way You Want Me" and "Don't Be Cruel". The Jordanaires sang harmony, as they had on The Steve Allen Show; they would work with Presley through the 1960s. A few days later, Presley made an outdoor concert appearance in Memphis, at which he announced, "You know, those people in New York are not gonna change me none. I'm gonna show you what the real Elvis is like tonight." In August, a judge in Jacksonville, Florida, ordered Presley to tame his act. Throughout the following performance, he largely kept still, except for wiggling his little finger suggestively in mockery of the order. The single pairing "Don't Be Cruel" with "Hound Dog" ruled the top of the charts for eleven weeks—a mark that would not be surpassed for 36 years. Recording sessions for Presley's second album took place in Hollywood in early September. Leiber and Stoller, the writers of "Hound Dog", contributed "Love Me".

Allen's show with Presley had, for the first time, beaten The Ed Sullivan Show in the ratings. Sullivan booked Presley for three appearances for an unprecedented $50,000. The first, on September 9, 1956, was seen by approximately 60 million viewers—a record 82.6 percent of the television audience. Actor Charles Laughton hosted the show, filling in while Sullivan was recovering from a car accident. According to legend, Presley was shot only from the waist up. Watching clips of the Allen and Berle shows, Sullivan had opined that Presley "got some kind of device hanging down below the crotch of his pants—so when he moves his legs back and forth you can see the outline of his cock. ... I think it's a Coke bottle. ... We just can't have this on a Sunday night. This is a family show!" Sullivan publicly told TV Guide, "As for his gyrations, the whole thing can be controlled with camera shots." In fact, Presley was shown head-to-toe. Though the camerawork was relatively discreet during his debut, with leg-concealing closeups when he danced, the studio audience reacted with screams. Presley's performance of his forthcoming single, the ballad "Love Me Tender", prompted a record-shattering million advance orders. More than any other single event, it was this first appearance on The Ed Sullivan Show that made Presley a national celebrity.

Accompanying Presley's rise to fame, a cultural shift was taking place that he both helped inspire and came to symbolize. The historian Marty Jezer wrote that Presley began the "biggest pop craze" since Glenn Miller and Frank Sinatra and brought rock and roll to mainstream culture:

As Presley set the artistic pace, other artists followed. ... Presley, more than anyone else, gave the young a belief in themselves as a distinct and somehow unified generation—the first in America ever to feel the power of an integrated youth culture.

==== Crazed crowds and film debut ====
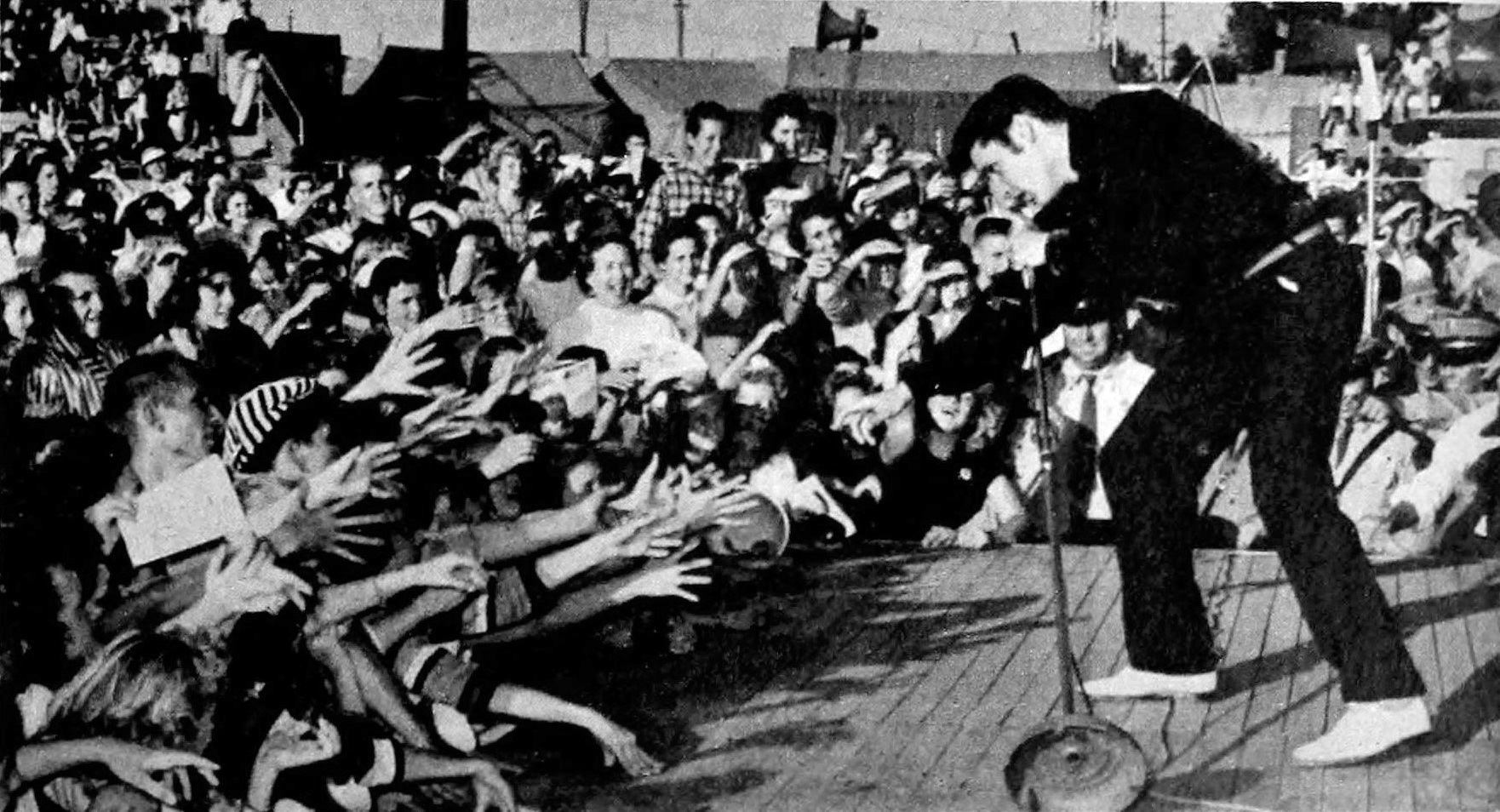
Presley performing live at the Mississippi-Alabama Fairgrounds in Tupelo, September 26, 1956

The audience response at Presley's live shows became increasingly fevered. Moore recalled, "He'd start out, 'You ain't nothin' but a Hound Dog,' and they'd just go to pieces. They'd always react the same way. There'd be a riot every time." At the two concerts he performed in September at the Mississippi–Alabama Fair and Dairy Show, fifty National Guardsmen were added to the police detail to prevent a ruckus. Elvis, Presley's second RCA Victor album, was released in October and quickly rose to number one. The album includes "Old Shep", which he sang at the talent show in 1945, and which now marked the first time he played piano on an RCA Victor session. According to Guralnick, "the halting chords and the somewhat stumbling rhythm" showed "the unmistakable emotion and the equally unmistakable valuing of emotion over technique." Assessing the musical and cultural impact of Presley's recordings from "That's All Right" through Elvis, rock critic Dave Marsh wrote that "these records, more than any others, contain the seeds of what rock & roll was, has been and most likely what it may foreseeably become."

Presley returned to The Ed Sullivan Show, hosted this time by its namesake, on October 28. After the performance, crowds in Nashville and St. Louis burned him in effigy. His first motion picture, Love Me Tender, was released on November 21. Though he was not top-billed, the film's original title—The Reno Brothers—was changed to capitalize on his latest number-one record: "Love Me Tender" had hit the top of the charts earlier that month. To further take advantage of Presley's popularity, four musical numbers were added to what was originally a straight acting role. The film was panned by critics but did very well at the box office. Presley received top billing on every subsequent film he made.

Moore, Black, and Fontana did not accompany Presley on the soundtrack recordings for Love Me Tender; 20th Century Fox had refused to allow Presley to use his own band, with the excuse that the band could not play country.

==== Leiber and Stoller collaboration and draft notice ====
Presley made his third and final Ed Sullivan Show appearance on January 6, 1957—on this occasion indeed shot only down to the waist. Some commentators have claimed that Parker orchestrated an appearance of censorship to generate publicity. In any event, as critic Greil Marcus describes, Presley "did not tie himself down. Leaving behind the bland clothes he had worn on the first two shows, he stepped out in the outlandish costume of a pasha, if not a harem girl. From the make-up over his eyes, the hair falling in his face, the overwhelmingly sexual cast of his mouth, he was playing Rudolph Valentino in The Sheik, with all stops out." To close, displaying his range and defying Sullivan's wishes, Presley sang a gentle black spiritual, "Peace in the Valley". At the end of the show, Sullivan declared Presley "a real decent, fine boy". Two days later, the Memphis draft board announced that Presley would be classified 1-A and would probably be drafted sometime that year.

Each of the three Presley singles released in the first half of 1957 went to number one: "Too Much", "All Shook Up", and "(Let Me Be Your) Teddy Bear". Already an international star, he was attracting fans even where his music was not officially released: The New York Times reported that pressings of his music on discarded X-ray plates were commanding high prices in Leningrad. Presley purchased his 18-room mansion, Graceland, on March 19, 1957. Before the purchase, Elvis recorded Loving You—the soundtrack to his second film, which was released in July. It was his third straight number-one album. The title track was written by Leiber and Stoller, who were then retained to write four of the six songs recorded at the sessions for Jailhouse Rock, Presley's next film. The songwriting team effectively produced the Jailhouse sessions and developed a close working relationship with Presley, who came to regard them as his "good-luck charm". "He was fast," said Leiber. "Any demo you gave him he knew by heart in ten minutes." The title track became another number-one hit, as was the Jailhouse Rock EP.

Presley undertook three brief tours during the year, continuing to generate a crazed audience response. A Detroit newspaper suggested that "the trouble with going to see Elvis Presley is that you're liable to get killed". Villanova students pelted the singer with eggs in Philadelphia, and in Vancouver the crowd rioted after the show ended, destroying the stage.

Leiber and Stoller were again in the studio for the recording of Elvis' Christmas Album. Toward the end of the session, they wrote a song on the spot at Presley's request: "Santa Claus Is Back in Town", an innuendo-laden blues. The holiday release stretched Presley's string of number-one albums to four and became the best-selling Christmas album ever in the United States, with eventual sales of over 20 million worldwide. After the session, Moore and Black—drawing only modest weekly salaries, sharing in none of Presley's massive financial success—resigned, though they were brought back on a per diem basis a few weeks later.

On December 20, Presley received his draft notice, though he was granted a deferment to finish the forthcoming film King Creole. A couple of weeks into the new year, "Don't", another Leiber and Stoller tune, became Presley's tenth number-one seller. Recording sessions for the King Creole soundtrack were held in Hollywood in mid-January 1958. Leiber and Stoller provided three songs, but it would be the last time Presley and the duo worked closely together. As Stoller later recalled, Presley's manager and entourage sought to wall him off. A brief soundtrack session on February 11 marked the final occasion on which Black was to perform with Presley.

=== 1958–1960: Military service and mother's death ===
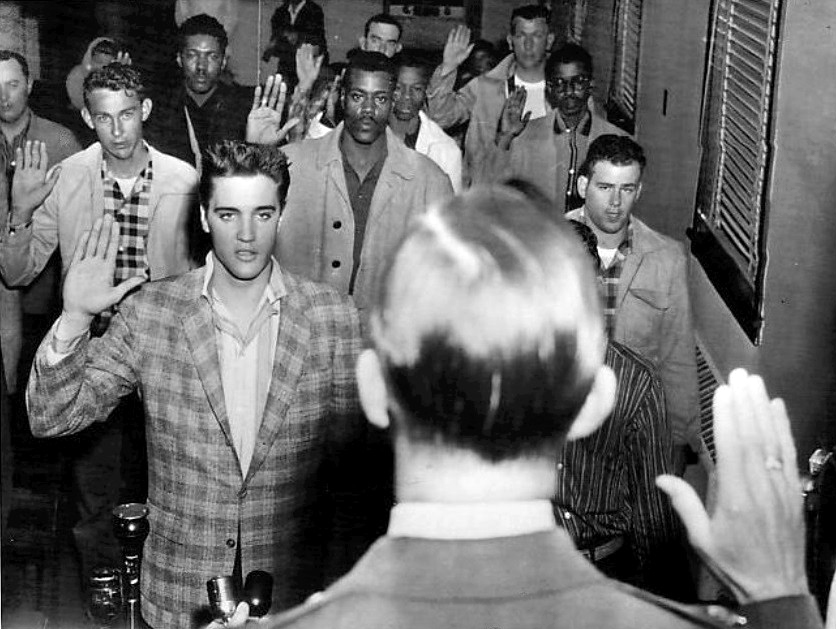
Presley being sworn into the Army on March 24, 1958, at Fort Chaffee

On March 24, 1958, Presley was drafted into the United States Army at Fort Chaffee in Arkansas. His arrival was a major media event. Hundreds of people descended on Presley as he stepped from the bus; photographers accompanied him into the installation. Presley announced that he was looking forward to his military service, saying that he did not want to be treated any differently from anyone else.

Between March 28 and September 17, 1958, Presley completed basic and advanced training at Fort Hood, Texas, where he was temporarily assigned to Company A, 2d Medium Tank Battalion, 37th Armor. During the two weeks' leave between his basic and advanced training in early June, he recorded five songs in Nashville.

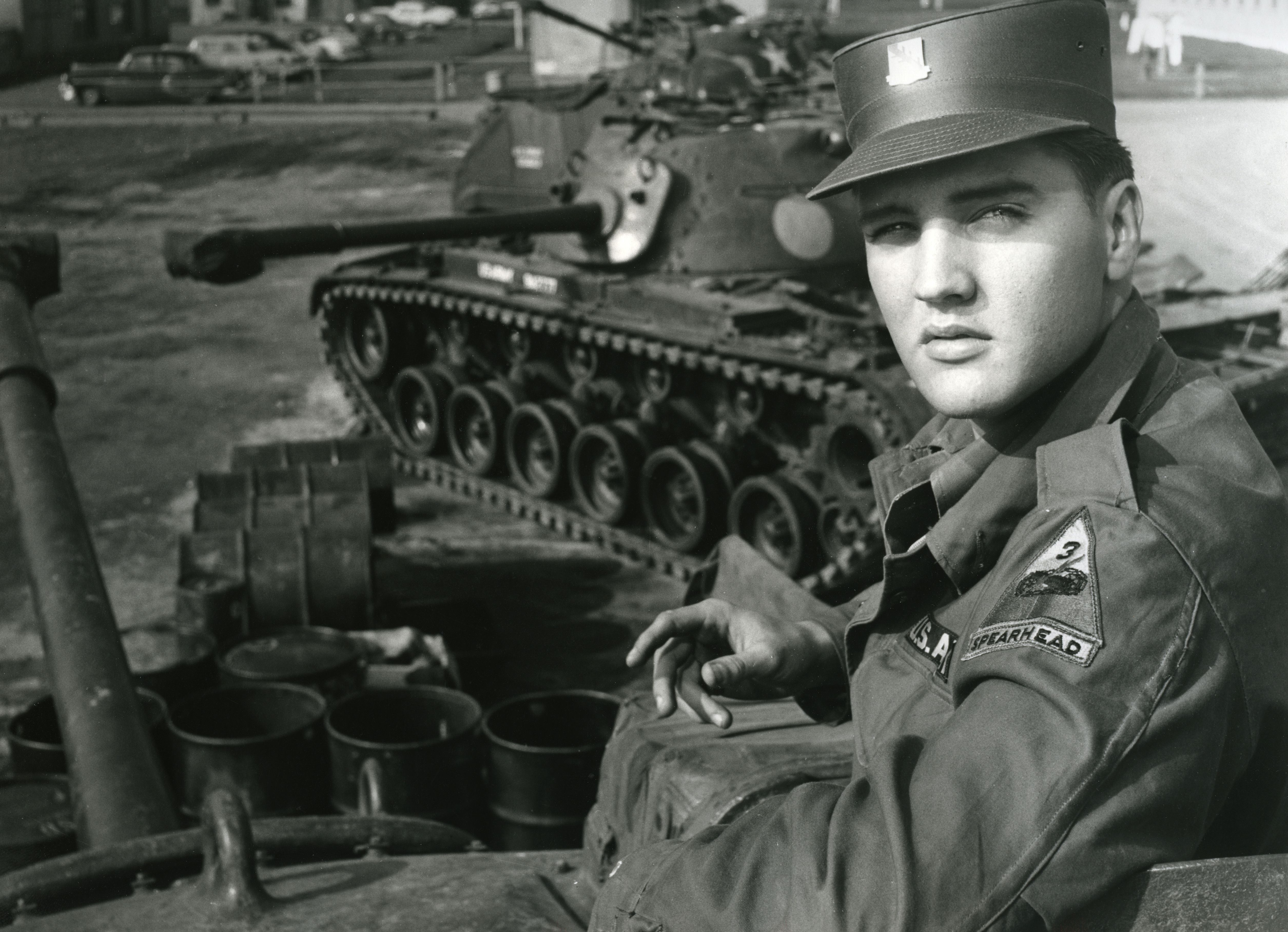
Presley, wearing the 3d Armored Division Shoulder Sleeve Insignia, poses atop a tank at Ray Barracks

Presley was promoted to sergeant on February 11, 1960.

While in Bad Nauheim, Presley, aged 24, met 14-year-old Priscilla Beaulieu. They would marry after a seven-and-a-half-year courtship. In her autobiography, Priscilla said that Presley was concerned that his 24 months in the military would ruin his career. In Special Services, he would have been able to perform and remain in touch with the public, but Parker had convinced him that to gain popular respect, he should serve as a regular soldier. Media reports echoed Presley's concerns about his career, but RCA producer Steve Sholes and Freddy Bienstock of Hill and Range had carefully prepared: armed with a substantial amount of unreleased material, they kept up a regular stream of successful releases. Between his induction and discharge, Presley had ten top-40 hits, including "Wear My Ring Around Your Neck", the bestselling "Hard Headed Woman", and "One Night" in 1958, and "(Now and Then There's) A Fool Such as I" and the number-one "A Big Hunk o' Love" in 1959. RCA also generated four albums compiling previously issued material during this period, most successfully Elvis' Golden Records (1958), which hit number three on the LP chart.

=== 1960–1968: Focus on films ===
==== Elvis Is Back ====
Presley returned to the US on March 2, 1960, and was honorably discharged three days later. The train that carried him from New Jersey to Tennessee was mobbed all the way, and Presley was called upon to appear at scheduled stops to please his fans. On the night of March 20, he entered RCA's Nashville studio (with Moore, Fontana, the Jordanaires, and members of the Nashville A-Team - but notably without Black) to cut tracks for a new album along with a single, "Stuck on You", which was rushed into release and swiftly became a number-one hit. Another Nashville session two weeks later yielded a pair of bestselling singles, the ballads "It's Now or Never" and "Are You Lonesome Tonight?", along with the rest of Elvis Is Back! The album features several songs described by Greil Marcus as full of Chicago blues "menace, driven by Presley's own super-miked acoustic guitar, brilliant playing by Scotty Moore, and demonic sax work from Boots Randolph. Elvis' singing wasn't sexy, it was pornographic." The record "conjured up the vision of a performer who could be all things", according to music historian John Robertson: "a flirtatious teenage idol with a heart of gold; a tempestuous, dangerous lover; a gutbucket blues singer; a sophisticated nightclub entertainer; [a] raucous rocker". Released only days after recording was complete, it reached number two on the album chart.

On May 12, Presley reappeared on television as a guest on The Frank Sinatra Timex Special. Also known as Welcome Home Elvis, the show had been taped in late March, the only time all year Presley performed in front of an audience. Parker secured an unheard-of $125,000 for eight minutes of singing. The broadcast drew an enormous viewership.

G.I. Blues, the soundtrack to Presley's first film since his return, was a number-one album in October. His first LP of sacred material, His Hand in Mine, followed two months later; it reached number 13 on the US pop chart and number 3 in the United Kingdom, remarkable figures for a gospel album. In February 1961, Presley performed two shows in Memphis, for a benefit for 24 local charities. During a luncheon preceding the event, RCA Victor presented him with a plaque certifying worldwide sales of over 75 million records. A twelve-hour Nashville session in mid-March yielded nearly all of Presley's next studio album, Something for Everybody. According to John Robertson, it exemplifies the Nashville sound, the restrained, cosmopolitan style that defined country music in the 1960s. Presaging much of what was to come from Presley over the next half-decade, the album is largely "a pleasant, unthreatening pastiche of the music that had once been Elvis' birthright". It was his sixth number-one LP. Another benefit concert, for a Pearl Harbor memorial, was staged on March 25 in Hawaii. It was Presley's last public performance for seven years.

==== The "Presley pictures" ====
Parker had by now pushed Presley into a heavy filmmaking schedule, focused on formulaic, modestly budgeted musical comedies. Presley initially insisted on pursuing higher roles, but when two films in a more dramatic vein—Flaming Star (1960) and Wild in the Country (1961)—were less commercially successful, he reverted to the formula. Among the twenty-seven films he made during the 1960s, there were a few further exceptions. His films were almost universally panned; critic Andrew Caine dismissed them as a "pantheon of bad taste". Nonetheless, they were virtually all profitable. Hal Wallis, who produced nine, declared, "A Presley picture is the only sure thing in Hollywood."

Of Presley's films in the 1960s, 15 were accompanied by soundtrack albums and another five by soundtrack EPs. The films' rapid production and release schedules—Presley frequently starred in three a year—affected his music. According to Jerry Leiber, the soundtrack formula was already evident before Presley left for the Army: "three ballads, one medium-tempo [number], one up-tempo, and one break blues boogie". As the decade wore on, the quality of the soundtrack songs grew "progressively worse". Julie Parrish, who appeared in Paradise, Hawaiian Style (1966), says that Presley disliked many of the songs. The Jordanaires' Gordon Stoker describes how he would retreat from the studio microphone: "The material was so bad that he felt like he couldn't sing it." Most of the film albums featured a song or two from respected writers such as the team of Doc Pomus and Mort Shuman. But by and large, according to biographer Jerry Hopkins, the numbers seemed to be "written on order by men who never really understood Elvis or rock and roll". In the first half of the decade, three of Presley's soundtrack albums were ranked number one on the pop charts, and a few of his most popular songs came from his films, such as "Can't Help Falling in Love" (1961) and "Return to Sender" (1962). From 1964 to 1968, Presley had one top-ten hit: "Crying in the Chapel" (1965), a gospel number recorded in 1960. As for non-film albums, between the June 1962 release of Pot Luck and the November 1968 release of the soundtrack to the television special that signaled his comeback, one LP of new material by Presley was issued: the gospel album How Great Thou Art (1967). It won him his first Grammy Award, for Best Sacred Performance. As Marsh described, Presley was "arguably the greatest white gospel singer of his time [and] really the last rock & roll artist to make gospel as vital a component of his musical personality as his secular songs".

=== 1968-1969: Comeback and split ===
==== Elvis: the '68 Comeback Special ====
Of the eight Presley singles released between January 1967 and May 1968, only two charted in the top 40, none higher than number 28. Three of his six albums were in the top 40. His forthcoming soundtrack album, Speedway, would rank at number 82. Parker had already shifted his plans to television: he maneuvered a deal with NBC that committed the network to finance Presley's first TV special and a movie.

Recorded in late June in Burbank, California, the special, simply called Elvis, aired on December 3, 1968. Later known as the '68 Comeback Special, the show featured lavishly staged studio productions as well as songs performed with a band in front of a small audience—Presley's first live performances since 1961. The live segments saw Presley dressed in tight black leather, singing and playing guitar in an uninhibited style reminiscent of his early rock and roll days. Director and co-producer Steve Binder worked hard to produce a show that was far from the hour of Christmas songs Parker had originally planned. The show, NBC's highest-rated that season, captured 42 percent of the total viewing audience. Marsh calls the performance one of "emotional grandeur and historical resonance".

By January 1969, the single "If I Can Dream", written for the special, reached number 12. The soundtrack album rose into the top ten. According to friend Jerry Schilling, the special reminded Presley of what "he had not been able to do for years, being able to choose the people; being able to choose what songs and not being told what had to be on the soundtrack. ... He was out of prison, man." Binder said of Presley's reaction, "I played Elvis the 60-minute show, and he told me in the screening room, 'Steve, it's the greatest thing I've ever done in my life. I give you my word I will never sing a song I don't believe in.'"

==== Presley's pivot to American Sound Studio and the TCB Band ====
Buoyed by the experience of the Comeback Special, Presley engaged in a prolific series of recording sessions at American Sound Studio, which led to the acclaimed From Elvis in Memphis. Released in June 1969, it was his first secular, non-soundtrack album from a dedicated period in the studio in eight years. As described by Marsh, it is "a masterpiece in which Presley immediately catches up with pop music trends that had seemed to pass him by during the movie years. He sings country songs, soul songs and rockers with real conviction, a stunning achievement." The album featured the hit single "In the Ghetto", issued in April, which reached number three on the pop chart—Presley's first non-gospel top ten hit since "Bossa Nova Baby" in 1963. Further hit singles were culled from the American Sound sessions: "Suspicious Minds", "Don't Cry Daddy", and "Kentucky Rain".

Presley was keen to resume regular live performing. After the success of the Comeback Special, offers came in from around the world. The London Palladium offered Parker US$28,000 (equivalent to $246,000 in 2025) for a one-week engagement. He responded, "That's fine for me, now how much can you get for Elvis?" In May, the brand-new International Hotel in Las Vegas, boasting the largest showroom in the city, booked Presley for fifty-seven shows over four weeks, beginning July 31. Moore, Fontana, and the Jordanaires declined to participate, afraid of losing the lucrative session work they had in Nashville. Presley assembled new, top-notch accompaniment - the TCB Band, led by guitarist James Burton - and including two gospel groups, The Imperials and Sweet Inspirations.

=== Partial reunions, other collaborations, and awards (1975–2009) ===
From the 1970s onwards, Moore and Fontana would occasionally reunite, though they would not use the "Blue Moon Boys" band name.

In 1975, Moore and Fontana reunited to record "E.P. Express" with friend Carl Perkins.

In August 1992, Moore and Fontana performed at Ellis Auditorium for a "Good Rockin' Tonight" show alongside Carl Perkins, the Jordanaires, James Burton, the Sun Rhythm Section, and Ronnie McDowell. They later took this show format on a small tour of England. In 1993, Moore, Fontana, and Carl Perkins performed at a telethon in Jackson, TN. Moore and Fontana also toured Europe with vocalist Bloomer Jenson, organized by the Elvis Presley fan club "It's Elvis Time". In 1994, Moore, Fontana, and Carl Perkins performed at the Jackson telethon again and were joined by McDowell.

In 1997, Moore and Fontana reunited to record the album All the King's Men, featuring guest appearances from the Bill Black Combo, Keith Richards and Ronnie Wood of The Rolling Stones, Jeff Beck, Levon Helm and Jim Weider of The Band, Rick Neilsen of Cheap Trick, and others. In April 1999, Fontana and Moore toured the UK.

In 2001, Moore and Fontana recorded a version of "That's All Right" with Paul McCartney for the documentary Good Rockin' Tonight: The Legacy of Sun Records.

In 2007, the Blue Moon Boys were inducted into the Musicians Hall of Fame and Museum in Nashville.

== Members ==
- Elvis Presley – lead vocals, rhythm and lead guitars, piano, percussion, bass guitar (1954–1968; died August 16, 1977)
- Scotty Moore – lead and rhythm guitars, occasional backing vocals (1954–1968; died June 28, 2016)
- Bill Black – double bass, bass guitar, occasional backing vocals (1954–1958; died October 21, 1965)
- D. J. Fontana – drums, percussion, occasional backing vocals (1955–1968; died June 13, 2018)
