= Lovins =

Lovins is a surname of English origin. Notable people with the name include:

- Amory Lovins (born 1947) — American physicist
- Julie Beth Lovins (1945—2018) — American computational linguist
- Hunter Lovins (born 1950) — American environmentalist
- Henry Lovins (1883—1960) — American co-founder of Hollywood Art Center School, husband of Mona Lue Lovins
- Mona Lue Lovins (1905—2000) — American co-founder of Hollywood Art Center School, wife of Henry Lovins

== See also ==
- Lovin
- Loving (disambiguation)
