= Loving You (soundtrack) =

Soundtrack album by Elvis Presley
- Released: June 20, 1957
- Recorded: January 12 – February 24, 1957
- Studio: Radio Recorders, Hollywood
- Genre: Rock and roll; rockabilly; pop
- Length: 26:23
- Label: RCA Victor
- Producer: Steve Sholes

Elvis Presley chronology
Peace in the Valley (1957)	Loving You (1957)	Elvis' Christmas Album (1957)

Singles from Loving You
- 1. "(Let Me Be Your) Teddy Bear" Released: June 11, 1957; 2. "Party" Released: September 1957; 3. "Mean Woman Blues" Released: 1957

Professional ratings
Review scores
Source	Rating
AllMusic	3/5 stars
MusicHound	4.5/5 stars
Rough Guides	4/5 stars
Uncut	4/5 stars

Loving You is the first soundtrack album by American rock and roll singer Elvis Presley. It was released by RCA Victor in mono, LPM 1515, in June 1957 to accompany his film, Loving You (1957). Recording sessions took place on January 15, 16, 17, and 18, 1957, at the Paramount Pictures Scoring Stage, and on January 12, 13, 19, and February 23 and 24, 1957, at Radio Recorders in Hollywood. These are the first sessions where Steve Sholes is officially listed as producer. It spent ten weeks at No. 1 on the Billboard Top Pop Albums chart. It was certified Gold on April 9, 1968 by the Recording Industry Association of America.

== Content ==
The soundtrack includes seven songs composed expressly for the movie Loving You from writers contracted to Elvis Presley Music and Gladys Music, the publishing companies owned by Presley and his manager, Colonel Tom Parker. An eighth song intended for but not appearing in the movie, "Don't Leave Me Now", was included on the album, and a new recording appeared on the soundtrack for his next film, Jailhouse Rock.

The previously released material comprises both sides of the single taken from the soundtrack, Presley's number one hit "(Let Me Be Your) Teddy Bear" backed with the film's title track, "Loving You". Producer Hal B. Wallis liked "Teddy Bear" so much that he insisted it be included in the movie. Songs were added to bring up the running time of the album, including the swing-era favorite "Blueberry Hill", which had been a big hit for Fats Domino in 1956. "Have I Told You Lately That I Love You?" had been done previously by the Sons of the Pioneers, as well as Bing Crosby with The Andrews Sisters. Cole Porter's "True Love", written for the 1956 musical film High Society, also made the album, either to feature a straightforward romantic song, or to give Presley and The Jordanaires an excuse for some close harmony singing. The practice of RCA augmenting soundtrack recordings with extra songs from non-soundtrack studio sessions to bring up the running time of the LP to acceptable lengths would become a commonplace occurrence with Presley soundtracks through the 1960s.

Two EPs were also issued containing only the soundtrack recordings.

== Reissues ==
RCA reissued the original 12-track album on compact disc in 1988 and in an expanded CD edition in 1997, appending eight tracks to the original album. All tracks derive from the same sessions, with three alternate takes, the remaining track from the Just For You EP, three single sides, including "Tell Me Why", which would wait almost nine years to be released, and a remake of the Sun master "When It Rains, It Really Pours", also released much later on the 1965 LP Elvis for Everyone. In 2005, RCA reissued the album again, remastered using DSD technology with the six bonus tracks appended in standard fashion. A two-disc set was released on the Follow That Dream collectors label on January 12, 2006, with the bonus tracks and numerous additional takes.

== Track listing ==
=== Original release ===
Chart positions for singles taken from the Billboard Pop Singles chart; for albums from the Billboard Top Pop Albums chart; for EPA 4041 from the newly inaugurated 1957 EP chart

Side one (songs from the film Loving You)
No.	Title	Writer(s)	Recording date	Length
1.	"Mean Woman Blues"	Claude Demetrius	January 13, 1957	2:15
2.	"(Let Me Be Your) Teddy Bear"	Kal Mann and Bernie Lowe	January 16, 1957	1:48
3.	"Loving You"	Jerry Leiber and Mike Stoller	February 24, 1957	2:12
4.	"Got a Lot o' Livin' to Do!"	Aaron Schroeder and Ben Weisman	January 12, 1957	2:31
5.	"Lonesome Cowboy"	Sid Tepper and Roy C. Bennett	January 15, 1957	3:07
6.	"Hot Dog"	Jerry Leiber and Mike Stoller	January 18, 1957	1:17
7.	"Party"	Jessie Mae Robinson	January 21, 1957	1:27

Side two (songs not included in the film)
No.	Title	Writer(s)	Recording date	Length
1.	"Blueberry Hill"	Vincent Rose, Al Lewis, Larry Stock	January 19, 1957	2:38
2.	"True Love"	Cole Porter	February 23, 1957	2:07
3.	"Don't Leave Me Now"	Aaron Schroeder and Ben Weisman	February 23, 1957	2:00
4.	"Have I Told You Lately That I Love You"	Scott Wiseman	January 19, 1957	2:30
5.	"I Need You So"	Ivory Joe Hunter	February 23, 1957	2:40

"Teddy Bear" and "Loving You" were released as a single and charted at, respectively, number one and number twenty on Billboard's Top 20 charts.

=== 1997 and 2005 reissue bonus tracks ===
Loving You was issued on CD with the original album's 12 songs plus the following bonus tracks:

No.	Title	Writer(s)	Recording date	Length
13.	"Tell Me Why" (originally released as a single, 47-8740, December 3, 1965, #33)	Titus Turner	January 12, 1957	2:05
14.	"Is It So Strange" (originally released on the Just For You EP, EPA 4041, April 1, 1957, #16)	Faron Young	January 19, 1957	2:28
15.	"One Night (of sin)" (alternated version of single release, 47-7410, October 21, 1958, #4)	Dave Bartholomew, Pearl King	February 23, 1957	2:29
16.	"When It Rains, It Really Pours" (originally released on the Elvis for Everyone, LSP 3450, August 10, 1965, #10)	William Emerson	February 24, 1957	1:47
17.	"I Beg of You" (alternate master take 12)	Rose Marie McCoy and Cliff Owens	January 13, 1957	1:50
18.	"Party" (alternate master take 7)	Jessie Mae Robinson	January 22, 1957	1:07
19.	"Loving You" (uptempo version alternate take 13)	Jerry Leiber and Mike Stoller	February 14, 1957	1:25
20.	"Got a Lot o' Livin' to Do" (finale)	Aaron Schroeder and Ben Weisman	January 12, 1957	1:20

=== 2006 Follow That Dream release ===
Disc 1

Original album
No.	Title	Length
1.	"Mean Woman Blues"	2:19
2.	"(Let Me Be Your) Teddy Bear"	1:49
3.	"Loving You"	2:15
4.	"Got A Lot O´ Livin´ To Do!"	2:32
5.	"Lonesome Cowboy"	3:06
6.	"Hot Dog"	1:16
7.	"Party"	1:32
8.	"Blueberry Hill"	2:40
9.	"True Love"	2:07
10.	"Don´t Leave Me Now"	2:00
11.	"Have I Told You Lately That I Love You"	2:32
12.	"I Need You So"	2:39

New bonus masters
No.	Title	Length
13.	"One Night"	2:32
14.	"I Beg Of You"	1:53
15.	"All Shook Up"	2:02
16.	"That´s When Your Heartaches Begin"	3:24
17.	"Tell Me Why"	2:08
18.	"Is It So Strange"	2:29
19.	"When It Rains, It Really Pours"	1:50
20.	"One Night (of Sin)"	2:36
21.	"I Beg Of You alternate master"	1:52
22.	"Loving You" (J-16 end version*)	2:18
23.	"Party" (A-7 alternate master)	1:21
24.	"Loving You" (K-03 main version*)	2:16
25.	"Loving You" (HX-14 farm version 2*)	2:04
26.	"Got A Lot O´ Livin´ To Do!" (R-13 finale)	1:31
27.	"Mean Woman Blues" (BX-07 version 2*)	2:34
28.	"Loving You" (KX-21 main version 2)	1:33
29.	"Loving You" (HZ 12 farm version 3)	2:05
30.	"Blueberry Hill" (from acetate)	3:12
31.	"Got A Lot O´ Livin´ To Do!" (D-17 main version [from acetate]*)	1:55

*previously unreleased

Disc 2

The February 14 Session
1-12. "Loving You" (HZ all mono farm version takes)
13-34. "Loving You" (KX all mono main version takes)
35-50. "Loving You" (KX take 1-15 binaural main version takes)

== Personnel ==
The Blue Moon Boys

- Elvis Presley – vocals, acoustic rhythm guitar, percussion on “(Let Me Be Your) Teddy Bear” (uncertain)
- Scotty Moore – electric lead guitar
- Bill Black – double bass
- D. J. Fontana – drums

The Jordanaires

- Gordon Stoker – piano on "Mean Woman Blues" and "Got a Lot o' Livin' to Do", percussion on "Have I Told You Lately That I Love You?" (uncertain), backing vocals
- Hoyt Hawkins – organ on "Blueberry Hill", "Have I Told You Lately That I Love You?" and "Is It So Strange", piano (uncertain), backing vocals
- Hugh Jarrett – backing vocals
- Neal Matthews – backing vocals

Additional personnel

- Dudley Brooks – piano on "Loving You", "Blueberry Hill", "True Love", "Don't Leave Me Now", "Have I Told You Lately That I Love You?", "I Need You So", "Is It So Strange", "One Night (of sin)" and "When It Rains, It Really Pours"
- George Fields – harmonica on "Party"
- Tiny Timbrell – acoustic rhythm guitar on "(Let Me Be Your) Teddy Bear", "Lonesome Cowboy", "Hot Dog" and "Party"

== Charts ==
Chart (1977)	Peak position
UK Albums (OCC)	24

== Certifications ==
Region	Certification	Certified units/sales
United States (RIAA)	Gold	500,000^{^}
^{^} Shipments figures based on certification alone.

== See also ==
- Loving You (1957 film)
