= Loving You =

Loving You, Loving U, Lovin' You, or Luvin' You may refer to:

== Film ==
- Loving You (1957 film), a film starring Elvis Presley
- Loving You (1995 film), a Chinese film starring Sean Lau
- Loving You (2003 film), a British television crime drama
- Loving You (2007 film), a Japanese film
- Loving You (2008 film), a Filipino film

== Literature ==
- Loving You (manga), a manga illustrated by Nami Akimoto
- Loving You, a 2003 novel by Maureen Child

== Music ==
=== Albums ===
- Loving You (Amanda Shires and Bobbie Nelson album), 2023
- Loving U, by Sistar, or the title song, 2012
- Loving You (Shirley Horn album) or the title song, 1997
- Loving You (soundtrack), by Elvis Presley, or the title song (see below), 1957
- Loving You, by Lani Misalucha, 2003
- Loving You, by Nick Kamen, 1988
- Loving You, by Tommy Page, 1996
- Luvin' You, by One Voice, or the title song, 2004
- Lovin' You (Richard Ashcroft album), 2025

=== Songs ===
- "Lovin' You", by Minnie Riperton, 1975; covered by Shanice, 1992
- "Lovin' You" (Kristine W song), 2001
- "Lovin' You" (The O'Jays song), 1987
- "Lovin' You" (S.E.S. song), 2000
- "Lovin' You" (Soulhead song), recording as Batti Baas, 2001
- "Lovin' You" (TVXQ song), 2007
- "Loving You" (Chris Rea song), 1982
- "Loving You" (Elvis Presley song), 1957
- "Loving You" (Feargal Sharkey song), 1985
- "Loving You" (Matt Cardle and Melanie C song), 2013
- "Loving You" (Michael Jackson song), 2014
- "Loving You" (Ric Segreto song), 1982; covered by Nina, 2002
- "Loving You" (Yoasobi song), 2024
- "Loving You (Is a Way of Life)", by Jon Stevens, 1980
- "Loving You (Ole Ole Ole)", by Brian Harvey, 2001
- "Lovin' U", by Melody, 2006
- "Lovin' You", by the Lovin' Spoonful from Hums of the Lovin' Spoonful, 1966
- "Lovin' You", by Johnny "Guitar" Watson from Listen, 1973: covered by Nikka Costa, 2008
- "Lovin' You", by Pat Travers from Putting It Straight, 1977
- "Lovin' You", by Tony! Toni! Tone! from House of Music, 1996
- "Loving You", by Atomic Kitten from Ladies Night, 2003
- "Loving You", by Badfinger from No Dice, 1992 reissue
- "Loving You", by Cannons, 2023
- "Loving You", by Duffy, a B-side of "Warwick Avenue", 2008
- "Loving You", by Jennifer Lopez from This Is Me... Then, 2002
- "Loving You", by Jessica Simpson from In This Skin, 2003
- "Loving You", by Marc et Claude, 2001
- "Loving You", by Pritam, Sonu Nigam and Antara Mitra from the 2007 Indian film Speed
- "Loving You", by the Orb from the single "A Huge Ever Growing Pulsating Brain That Rules from the Centre of the Ultraworld", 1989
- "Loving You", written by Stephen Sondheim for the musical Passion, 1994
- "Loving You", by Sylvia Ratonel from Sylvia Ratonel, 2011
- "Loving U", by Sistar from Loving U, 2012
- "Loving You", by Wet Leg from Wet Leg, 2022
- "Luving U", by 6lack from Free 6lack, 2016
