= Loving =

Loving may refer to:

- Love, a range of human emotions
- Loving (surname)
- Loving v. Virginia, a 1967 landmark United States Supreme Court civil rights case

== Film and television ==
- Loving (1970 film), an American film
- Loving (1996 film), a British television film based on the novel by Henry Green
- Loving (2016 film), a film about the Supreme Court decision Loving v. Virginia
- Carry On Loving, a 1970 film in the Carry On series
- Loving (TV series), an American daytime soap opera

== Music ==
- Lovin', 2021 extended play by Ailee
- Loving (band), Canadian psychedlic folk band

== Other media ==
- Loving (novel), a 1945 novel by Henry Green
- Loving, a 1981 novel by Danielle Steel

== Places in the United States ==
- Loving, New Mexico, a village
- Loving, Oklahoma, an unincorporated community
- Loving, Texas, an unincorporated community
- Loving County, Texas, the least populous county in the U.S. with a permanent population.

== See also ==
- Lovin, a surname
- Loving You (disambiguation)
