= (Let Me Be Your) Teddy Bear =

1957 song by Elvis Presley

- US 78 rpm issue

Single by Elvis Presley

from the album Loving You
- B-side: "Loving You"
- Released: June 11, 1957
- Recorded: January 16, 1957
- Studio: Radio Recorders, Hollywood
- Genre: Rock and roll
- Length: 1:46
- Label: RCA Victor
- Songwriters: Kal Mann, Bernie Lowe
- Producer: Walter Scharf

Elvis Presley singles chronology
"All Shook Up" (1957)	"(Let Me Be Your) Teddy Bear" (1957)	"Jailhouse Rock" (1957)

"(Let Me Be Your) Teddy Bear"

Single by Elvis Presley

from the album Elvis Sings for Children and Grownups Too
- B-side: "Puppet on a String"
- Released: July 3, 1978
- Recorded: January 16, 1957
- Studio: Radio Recorders, Hollywood, California
- Genre: Rock and roll, rhythm and blues
- Length: 1:46
- Label: RCA Victor
- Songwriters: Kal Mann, Bernie Lowe
- Producer: Walter Scharf

Elvis Presley singles chronology
"Unchained Melody" (1978)	"(Let Me Be Your) Teddy Bear" (1978)	"Are You Sincere" (1979)

"(Let Me Be Your) Teddy Bear" is a popular song first recorded by Elvis Presley in 1957 for the soundtrack of his second motion picture, Loving You, during which Presley performs the song on screen. It was written by Kal Mann and Bernie Lowe and published in 1957 by Gladys Music.

== Presley single ==
The song was a US No. 1 hit during the summer of 1957, staying at No. 1 on the Billboard charts for seven weeks, the third of the four number-one singles Presley had that year. "(Let Me Be Your) Teddy Bear" would also hit No. 1 on Billboard's R&B Best Sellers List, becoming his fourth No. 1 on that chart. The song also reached No. 1 on Billboard's country charts for one week. In Canada, it was also No. 1 for 7 weeks.

== Track listing ==
No.	Title	Writer(s)	Length
1.	"(Let Me Be Your) Teddy Bear"	Kal Mann and Bernie Lowe	1:47
2.	"Loving You"	Jerry Leiber and Mike Stoller	2:14

== Personnel ==
Credits from Keith Flynn and Ernst Jorgensen's examination of session tapes and RCA and AFM/union paperwork.

The Blue Moon Boys

- Elvis Presley – lead vocals, percussion
- Scotty Moore – lead guitar
- Bill Black – double bass
- D.J. Fontana – drums

Additional musicians

- The Jordanaires (Gordon Stoker, Hoyt Hawkins, Neal Matthews, Hugh Jarrett) – backing vocals
- Tiny Timbrell – rhythm guitar
- undetermined (either Dudley Brooks, Hoyt Hawkins, or Gordon Stoker) – piano

Production staff

- Walter Scharf – producer
- Phil Kahgan – engineer

== Cover versions ==
- Shorty Mitchell With The Ken Jones Rock 'n' Rollers "(Let Me Be Your) Teddy Bear" and "All Shook Up" (Embassy single, 1957, UK, available on The Birth of British Rock, Frémeaux & Associés)
- Barry Frank "(Let Me Be Your) Teddy Bear" and "I'm Gonna Sit Right Down and Write Myself a Letter" on Bell Records (1957)
- Peter Kraus released a version in German titled "Teddybär" (1957)
- Johnny Hallyday recorded a home demo version in French titled "Ton Petit Ours En Peluche" (1959)
- Jerry Kennedy on his LP "Dancing Guitars Rock The Hits Of The King" (1962)
- Pat Boone on his LP Pat Boone Sings Guess Who? (1963)
- Laurel Aitken on his LP Scandal in a Brixton Market (1969)
- Barbara Ruskin recorded her version of the song. It was released as "(I Wanna Be Your) Teddy Bear" on the A side of her single that was released on President PT 350 in 1971.
- Jimmy Osmond (credited to Little Jimmy Osmond) on his LP "Killer Joe" (1972)
- Glen Campbell on his album Live at the Royal Festival Hall (1977)
- Paul McCartney and Wings covered the song during one of their final recording sessions in November 1980. The track remains unreleased.
- Angelyne on her album Angelyne (1982)
- Mud on their album Les Grays Mud (1982)
- Cliff Richard on his limited release album Rock 'n' Roll Silver (1983).
- Tanya Tucker on the compilation It's Now or Never: The Tribute to Elvis (1994)
- ZZ Top on their album XXX (1999)
- Donna Loren on her EP Donna Does Elvis in Hawaii (2010)
- The Residents on their album The King & Eye (1989)
- João Penca e Seus Miquinhos Amestrados performs a Portuguese adaptation of the song, entitled "O Ursinho", in their album Os Maiores Sucessos de João Penca e Seus Miquinhos Amestrados (1983)
- Take That with Mark Owen on lead vocal as a live performance (part of the "Rock 'N' Roll Medley") during their Everything Changes Tour (1993–1994)

The song was used in Full House and in the Disney special D-TV Romancin'.
