= Lowin (surname) =

Lowin is a surname. Notable people with the surname include:

- Heinz Lowin (1938–1987), German footballer
- John Lowin (1576–1653), English actor

== See also ==
- Lewin
- Lovin
- Lowing
- Łowin (disambiguation)
