= Loving You Is Easy =

Loving You Is Easy may refer to:

- "Lovin' You Is So Easy", 1972 song by The Temprees from Dedicated to the One I Love
- "Loving You Is Easy", 1984 song by Tracey Ullman, composed by Doug Taylor, from You Caught Me Out
- "Loving You Is Easy", 2004 song by The Charlatans from Up at the Lake
- "Loving You Is Easy", 2010 song by Sarah McLachlan from Laws of Illusion
- "Loving You Is Easy", 2010 song by Chris August from No Far Away, and Ben Rector from Into the Morning
- "Loving You Is Easy", 2011 song by Marié Digby from Your Love
- "Loving You Is Easy", 2013 song by Union J from Union J
- "Loving You Is Easy", 2013 song by Austin Mahone from Extended Play
- "Loving You Is Easy", 2013 song by Camo & Krooked

== See also ==
- Loving You (disambiguation)
