= Loving (surname) =

Loving is an English surname. Notable people with the surname include:

- Alvin D. Loving (1935–2005), African-American painter
- Candy Loving (born 1956), American model
- Cynthia Loving or Lil' Mo (born 1975), American R&B singer and radio personality
- Dwight J. Loving, American soldier on death row
- Frank Loving (1860–1882), American Old West gambler and gunman
- George G. Loving, Jr. (1923–2016), American Air Force lieutenant general
- James C. Loving (1836–1902), American cattleman and rancher in Texas
- Jayden Loving (born 2003), American football player
- Mildred and Richard Loving, the plaintiffs in Loving v. Virginia
- Oliver Loving (1812–1867), American cattle rancher and pioneer
- Richard Loving (artist) (1924–2021), American painter
- Ruth B. Loving (1914–2014), American activist
- Susan B. Loving, American lawyer, Oklahoma's first female attorney general
- Walter Loving (1872–1945), American soldier and musician, leader of the Philippine Constabulary Band
- Warren Loving (born 1960), American football player

== See also ==
- Lovin
