= Doug Poindexter =

American singer-songwriter

- Born: Douglas Winston Poindexter; October 19, 1927; Vanndale, Arkansas, U.S.
- Died: October 1, 2004 (aged 76) Memphis, Tennessee, U.S.
- Genres: Country music
- Instruments: Vocals, guitar
- Years active: c.1950–1954
- Label: Sun

Douglas Winston Poindexter (October 19, 1927 – October 1, 2004) was an American singer and guitarist who fronted the country band The Starlight Wranglers (or Starlite Wranglers) in the early 1950s and recorded for Sun Records. Members of his band included Scotty Moore and Bill Black, before they started playing with Elvis Presley.

== Biography ==
Poindexter was born in Vanndale, Arkansas. He idolized Hank Williams. By 1953 he had moved to Memphis, Tennessee, and joined a band, the Starlight (or Starlite) Wranglers, whose members included Scotty Moore on electric guitar, Bill Black on bass, Clyde Rush on acoustic guitar, Millard Yeow on steel guitar, and Tommy Sealey on fiddle. The band played what at the time was called hillbilly music, and Poindexter sang with a pronounced nasal twang.

In May 1954, Moore organized a session for the group at the Sun Studio in Memphis, where they recorded two songs, "Now She Cares No More" and the more upbeat "My Kind of Carrying On". A single was released (Sun 202) but was unsuccessful. Elvis Presley had seen the band perform, and, six weeks after Poindexter's session, Moore and Black played with Presley on his seminal recording of "That's All Right". It has been speculated that Poindexter may have played on some of Presley's early recordings such as "Good Rockin' Tonight", or helped with the arrangements. He certainly performed with Presley at some early shows, and is credited with playing guitar and percussion on 1954 recordings issued in 1956 on Presley's debut album.

Poindexter left the music business by the end of 1954. He said: "There was no way of knowing that success was coming to Presley. Frankly, I thought the boy would starve to death." He later worked in insurance, and for a baking company, and became the owner of Southern Statistical Computer Consultants.

Poindexter died at Baptist Memorial Hospital-Memphis in 2004, aged 76.
