= Łowin =

Łowin may refer to the following places in Poland:

- Łowin, Lower Silesian Voivodeship (south-west Poland)
- Łowin, Kuyavian-Pomeranian Voivodeship (north-central Poland)

== See also ==
- Lowin (surname)
