= Claude Demetrius =

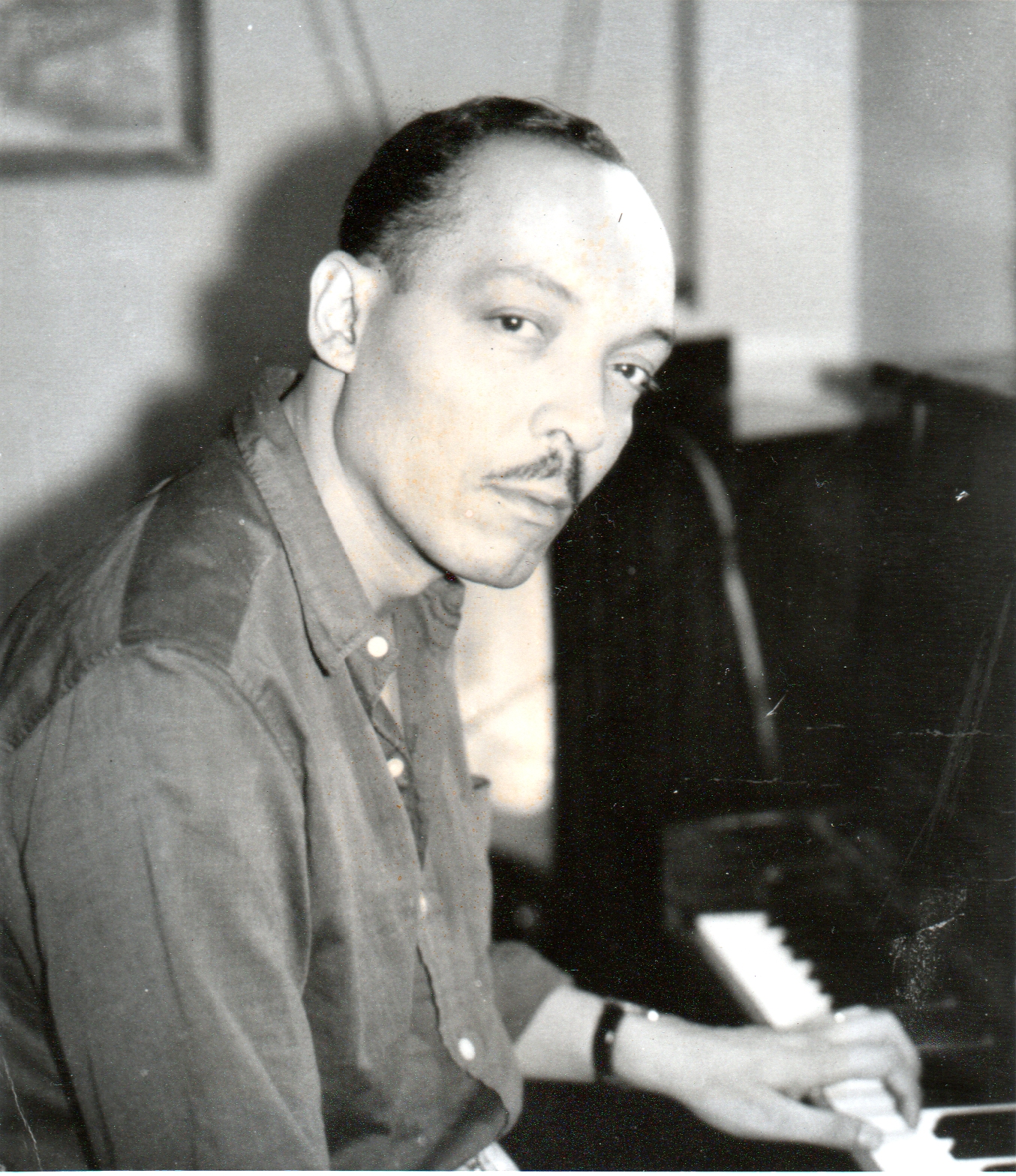

Background information
- Born: August 3, 1916; Bath, Maine, U.S.
- Died: May 1, 1988 (aged 71) New York City, New York, U.S.
- Genres: Rockabilly
- Occupation: Songwriter

Claude Demetrius (August 3, 1916 – May 1, 1988) was an American songwriter. He was known for his rockabilly songs, some of which were made famous by singers such as Elvis Presley.

== Biography ==
Demetrius was born in Bath, Maine, United States. By his early twenties he was in New York City writing music for and/or with Louis Armstrong. Demetrius wrote the 1945 musical comedy short film Open the Door, Richard. During the 1940s, he was closely associated with Louis Jordan. He wrote songs with Jordan that included material for the 1946 Black musical film Beware in which Jordan had the starring role. Some of Demetrius' best-known compositions from that era were co-written with Jordan's wife, Fleecie Moore, including the song "Ain't That Just Like a Woman (They'll Do It Every Time)."

For two decades, Claude Demetrius made a reasonably good living but in 1956 his income would change dramatically after he began writing for Gladys Music, Inc. Newly formed by Jean and Julian Aberbach, the company owned the exclusive publishing rights to the music of Elvis Presley. Working for Gladys Music, Demetrius co-wrote a song called "I Was The One" that was the B-side to Presley's first RCA single, "Heartbreak Hotel." In 1957 he composed "Mean Woman Blues" for Presley's 1957 motion picture soundtrack, Loving You that was released on the record album of the same name as well as on Side 2 of a four-song EP record. The song was also the B-side of the European release of Jerry Lee Lewis' hit "Great Balls of Fire" on London Records. Demetrius topped off a successful year when he co-wrote with Aaron Schroeder the song "Santa, Bring My Baby Back (To Me)" which appeared on the 1957 Elvis' Christmas Album.

In 1958, Demetrius scored his biggest success of all with his composition of "Hard Headed Woman". Demetrius wrote it for Presley's 1958 film King Creole. Both numbers were part of the soundtrack, but "Hard Headed Woman" and not the title song was released as the representative 45 rpm single. The recording reached No. 1 on the Billboard charts.

In 1963, "Mean Woman Blues" was recorded again, this time by Roy Orbison on a 45 rpm single that went to No. 5 on the Billboard Hot 100 chart and was part of Orbison's 1964 album, More of Roy Orbison's Greatest Hits. The timeless rock song was also sung by him on the 1989 HBO television special called Roy Orbison and Friends, A Black and White Night.

Claude Demetrius died in 1988 in New York City.
