= Loving You (1957 film) =

1957 film by Hal Kanter, Herbert Baker, Hal B. Wallis

- Theatrical release poster
- Directed by: Hal Kanter
- Screenplay by: Herbert Baker; Hal Kanter
- Story by: Mary Agnes Thompson
- Produced by: Hal B. Wallis
- Starring: Elvis Presley; Lizabeth Scott; Wendell Corey
- Cinematography: Charles Lang, Jr.
- Edited by: Howard Smith
- Music by: Walter Scharf
- Production company: Hal Wallis Productions
- Distributed by: Paramount Pictures
- Release date: July 9, 1957 (United States)
- Running time: 101 minutes
- Country: United States
- Language: English
- Box office: $3.7 million (USA)

Loving You is a 1957 American musical drama film directed by Hal Kanter and starring Elvis Presley, Lizabeth Scott, and Wendell Corey. The film was Presley's first major starring role, following his debut in a supporting role in the 1956 film Love Me Tender. The film follows a delivery man who is discovered by a music publicist and a country–western musician who wants to promote the talented newcomer.

The film was written by Herbert Baker and Hal Kanter, and based on the short story "A Call from Mitch Miller". Kanter expanded the script after being inspired by Presley's last appearance on the Louisiana Hayride and his manager Colonel Tom Parker's antics. Paramount Pictures chose to ignore the first-run theater system, opting instead to release the film in sub-run neighborhood theaters, a system later dubbed the "Presley Pattern".

Loving You opened nationwide on July 9, 1957, and was a box office success. Composed by Jerry Leiber and Mike Stoller, Presley's single "(Let Me Be Your) Teddy Bear", backed with "Loving You", was certified platinum by the Recording Industry Association of America.

== Plot ==
Walter "Tex" Warner (Wendell Corey), a seasoned country and western bandleader past his prime, and his manager and love interest, Glenda Markle (Lizabeth Scott), work for the campaign of Texas gubernatorial candidate Jim Tallman. During a campaign stop in the town of Delville, Deke Rivers (Elvis Presley) and a workmate deliver an order of beer. While they are unloading, the workmate talks to Glenda about Deke's singing ability, which Glenda jumps on to revive the sagging interest in the event by using local talent. She convinces Deke to sing a song with the backing of Tex's Rough Ridin' Ramblers.

Seeing the positive reception by the female audience, Glenda tries to convince Deke to join the Tex Warner Show. Driving in Deke's hotrod, she tells him about his potential. Not willing to leave his first steady job in a year, he rejects the offer, but Glenda asks him to think about it. Upon returning to town, Glenda calls the Highway Beverage Company, after which she and Tex quit the Tallman campaign to return to their own roadshow.

The following morning, as the group is leaving town, Deke accepts Glenda's offer, after being fired by his employer because of a false complaint to the drinks company by Glenda regarding a fictitious late delivery. Glenda just happens to have prepared a contract, which grants her half of his income. Not realizing he is being ripped off, Deke foolishly signs it. With Tex headlining, they start touring throughout Texas, along two other acts: Susan "Susie" Jessup (Dolores Hart) and a singing trio. As Deke's popularity grows, Glenda devises publicity stunts to leverage it. At one show, she pays two aged woman to criticize him. When they start to argue with young fans, Glenda has a press photographer document the incident. As the tour progresses, Deke and Susan become interested in one another.

After playing small venues, the group is hired to play in a large Amarillo theater on a four-day run. Convinced that it is his ticket to regain fame, Tex accepts Glenda's suggestion to share the bill with Deke, after which she calls reporters of The Dallas Chronicle to write a story on Deke. Later that night, Deke is provoked at a restaurant by the boyfriend of one of his fans, who wants to hear him sing a song. After singing to a tune from the jukebox, he starts a fight with him. He is later exonerated by the police.

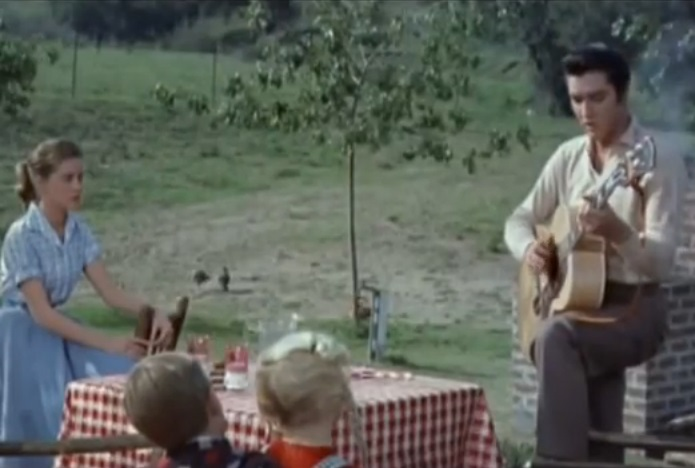
Deke sings "Loving You" for the Jessup family.

After the end of the four-day engagement, Deke's management is offered a one-man show in Freegate, Texas, outside of Dallas. Due to the terms of the contract, Tex fires Susan and the singing trio, leaving only Deke in the show. Before he has to begin his new tour, Deke drives Susan to her family's farm. Meanwhile, in another publicity move, Glenda convinces Tex to buy an Imperial against his life insurance for Deke, inventing a story to tell Deke that it was a gift from the widow of an oil magnate. Back on the farm, Deke and Susan talk, where she tells him about being fired, after which they are about to kiss, when they are interrupted by her parents, who ask him to sing the song he promised. After Deke sings "Loving You", a surprised Susan remarks that she never heard him sing that way; Deke admits that he never felt that way before.

Glenda arrives at the farm with the Imperial, and urges him to leave with her for Freegate to do the show. On their way back, Deke confesses to Glenda that his real surname is Tompkins. Deciding to disclose his past, they drive to Allen City, to the Woodbine cemetery, where he shows her the Tomb of Deke Rivers. He explains that when the orphanage he lived in burned down eleven years earlier, he decided to bury his past, and took Rivers' name.

Meanwhile, in Freegate, the concert is cancelled by the Mayor's office, after they received complaints from parents about Deke's music. Glenda arranges a studio telecast of a concert from Freegate in order to gain publicity; this enables her to convince the town board to allow him to perform. Deke, unhappy, is considering leaving the entertainment business. When Glenda finds out, she talks him into performing, after which they kiss.

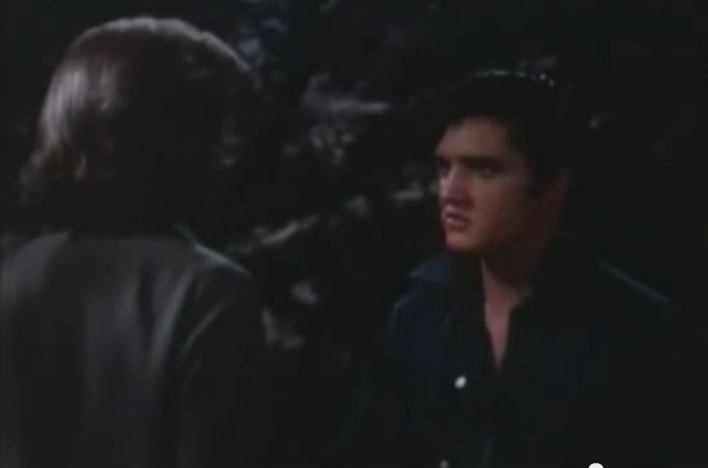
Deke confronts Glenda after she finds him.

On the day of the telecast, Deke is shocked after learning that Tex was married to (and later divorced from) Glenda. Disillusioned, he drives off before the show. When Glenda finds out about it from Tex, she goes after Deke, finding him after he was run off the road by crossing cattle. Glenda confesses everything to him: getting him fired and lying about the Imperial, after which she tears up their contract, before convincing him to return for the broadcast.

While the concert is delayed, fans are filmed by local newscasters defending Deke's music. Eventually, an upset Susan arrives to reveal that Deke will not appear on the show. However, Deke does appear shortly after, declaring that he had "something very important to say to somebody", and starts the show by singing "Loving You". As the song ends, Susan goes onstage with him, after which they meet Tex and Glenda backstage. Deke offers to let them both manage him, as he is offered a recording contract. Tex and Glenda reconcile; meanwhile, Deke and Susan kiss.

== Cast ==
- Elvis Presley as Deke Rivers
- Lizabeth Scott as Glenda Markle
- Wendell Corey as Tex Warner
- with James Gleason as Carl Meade
- Ralph Dumke as Jim Tallman
- Paul Smith as Skeeter
- Ken Becker as Wayne
- Jana Lund as Daisy Bricker
- and introducing Dolores Hart as Susan Jessup

== Cast notes ==
Elvis Presley plays Deke Rivers (whose real name is Jimmy Tompkins), a deliveryman who is discovered by the manager of a band. The film is Presley's second motion picture following his debut in the 1956 film Love Me Tender and his first starring role. It also marked the beginning of his seven-film streak for Paramount produced by Hal Wallis. For the role, Presley dyed his hair black following his favorite actors: Tony Curtis and Rudolph Valentino. As the second of his 1956 three-movie deal with Paramount Pictures, Presley was paid US$150,000.

Lizabeth Scott plays Glenda Markle, manager and love interest of bandleader "Tex" Warner. Known for her roles in the 1940s and early 1950s, Scott returned from retirement to co-star in the movie.

Wendell Corey plays Walter "Tex" Warner, bandleader of the Rough Ridin' Cowboys and the roadshow that Deke joins and revitalizes. Corey was known for his appearances in Alfred Hitchcock's Rear Window and Joseph Anthony's The Rainmaker. A decade earlier, he co-starred with Lizabeth Scott in 1947's Desert Fury and I Walk Alone.

Dolores Hart plays Susan Jessup, a young singer who tours with Tex Warner's band and Deke's love interest. Cast in her first movie role, Hart was discovered by Wallis after he saw her in a production of Joan of Lorraine at Loyola University. He screen-tested Hart on January 16, 1957, and later signed her for US$250 a week. Then named Dolores Hicks, Wallis requested her to change her name to favor her acting career. She adopted Hart, after the maiden surname of a friend. The actress changed it legally to "Dolores Hart". A year after Loving You, Hart was cast as Presley's love interest in his 1958 black-and-white musical drama, King Creole.

Ken Becker also occasionally billed as Kenny Becker or Kenneth Becker, plays Deke's rival, Wayne, who loses a fistfight with Deke. Becker played similar roles in three later Presley films, G.I. Blues (1960), Girls! Girls! Girls! (1962) and Roustabout (1964).

Jana Lund plays Daisy Bricker, the object of Wayne's jealousy, who kisses Deke (Presley's first on-screen kiss). A year earlier, she appeared in another rock and roll film, 1956's Don't Knock the Rock. Following Loving You, she had roles in three other titles in the psychotronic film genre, 1958's High School Hellcats, Hot Car Girl and Frankenstein 1970.

== Production ==
The film was based on the short story "A Call from Mitch Miller", written by Mary Agnes Thompson and published in the June 1956 issue of Good Housekeeping. In that year, producer Hal Wallis bought the rights for the story to turn it into a vehicle for Presley's first starring role for Paramount Pictures. Six months before the start of the production, Wallis loaned Presley to 20th Century Fox, where he appeared in his movie debut, the 1956 film Love Me Tender.

The producer then selected Hal Kanter to direct the film and to co-write the script with Herbert Baker. To write a script adjusted to Presley, Kanter traveled to Memphis, Tennessee, to meet him in person. Along with Presley's entourage, he went to Shreveport to see the last performance of the singer on the country television show, Louisiana Hayride. Kanter witnessed the reaction from fans, as well as Presley's manager Colonel Tom Parker's handling of the spectacle, both of which he used as an inspiration for the script. The working titles of the movie were "Lonesome Cowboy", "Running Wild", "Stranger in Town", and "Something for the Girls". Due to the appeal of Presley's previous film being titled after a song sung by Presley, Wallis selected the final name for the film, using the Jerry Leiber and Mike Stoller ballad penned for the movie, "Loving You".

Shot in Technicolor and VistaVision, the production started on January 21, 1957, ending on March 8. The film was shot at the Paramount studios, except the Jessup farm scenes, which were shot in the Hollywood Hills. The film features appearances by Presley's guitarist Scotty Moore, bassist Bill Black, drummer D.J. Fontana, and The Jordanaires. Presley's parents, Gladys and Vernon, who visited the set of the film, were included in the final scene of the film as part of the audience of the telecast.

Loving You premiered in Memphis on July 10, 1957, at the Strand Theater. Presley did not go to that showing, instead opting to take girlfriend Anita Wood, as well as his parents to a private midnight screening. The film opened nationally on July 30, 1957, and peaked at #7 on the Variety National Box Office Survey, staying on the chart for four weeks.

=== Soundtrack ===
The soundtrack of the film was recorded from January 15–18, 1957, at the Paramount Pictures Scoring Stage, and in two additional sessions at Radio Recorders in Hollywood on January 12, 13, and 19, and February 23–24, 1957. It contains seven songs, composed expressly for the movie by writers contracted to Elvis Presley Music and Gladys Music, the publishing companies owned by Presley and his manager, Colonel Tom Parker. The title tune, "Loving You", was composed by Jerry Leiber and Mike Stoller. The single "(Let Me Be Your) Teddy Bear" backed with "Loving you" sold over a million copies, and was later certified platinum on March 27, 1992, by the Recording Industry Association of America.

"Loving You"
Elvis Presley's "Loving You"

Performed by Presley:

- "Mean Woman Blues"
- "(Let Me Be Your) Teddy Bear"
- "Loving You"
- "Got a Lot o' Livin' to Do"
- "Lonesome Cowboy"
- "Hot Dog"
- "Party"

== Release and reception ==
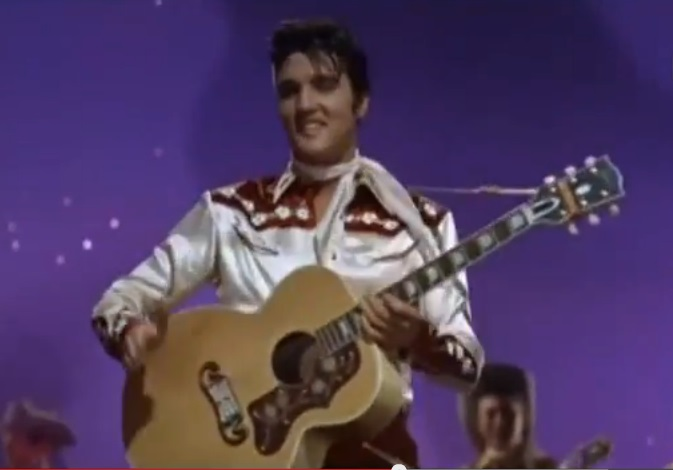
Presley performs (Let Me Be Your) Teddy Bear.

The film premiered on July 9, 1957, at the Strand Theater in Memphis, opening nationally on July 30. Due to Presley's massive appeal, for the first time, the studio decided to bypass the established first-run theater system. Paramount opted instead for a wide release, sending it to neighborhood theaters in New York, Chicago, and Detroit. This new system was dubbed the "Presley Pattern", which consisted of delivering the product to its direct market by cutting the expenses of premieres in downtown theaters, choosing instead local venues for a wider and more profitable release.

=== Box office ===
Upon its release, it appeared on Variety's National Box Office Survey for four weeks, peaking at number seven. The film grossed a total of US$3.7 million in 1957. While Presley was in the army, the movie was re-released in the summer of 1959. The box office results were not impressive, the film grossing US$74,000.

=== Reviews ===
Variety wrote a favorable review, noting that Presley "shows improvement as an actor ... being surrounded by a capable crew of performers". The New York Times criticized his acting: the review opened "For Paramount's 'Loving You', starring America's favorite hound-dog hollerer ... does just about everything, and little else, to prove that it ain't—isn't". The Los Angeles Times declared it "A furtive step on Presley's part in a screen career". The Michigan Christian Advocate delivered a negative review and called the film "an apologia for Elvis Presley" and considered it "part of the passing American scene" that would "undoubtedly bore many and interest an equal number".

On its review, Monthly Film Bulletin qualified Presley's career as "one of the most puzzling and less agreeable aspects of modern popular music". the review declared: "Presley adopts a slurred and husky style of delivery and a series of grotesque body gestures to impose on his otherwise innocuous material a suggestive meaning. ... in 'Loving You' he is allowed more scope and is at times both the cause and sum total of the film's somewhat doubtful entertainment value." Down Beat opened its review mentioning the negative reception of Presley by the press, indicating that while other publications "hotly despised" him, Down Beat was "prepared to dismiss him with a decimating round of punfire". The reviewer, however noted that after watching Loving You, it was "amiss to speak unkindly of [Presley]", and that the film was "a rather entertaining pic". It remarked the "resourcefulness" of Lizabeth Scott, the "positive acting ability augmented by a fresh prettiness" of Dolores Hart, and the "witty lines and range of expressions" delivered by Wendell Corey. The review favored Presley, describing his performance as "an overpowering, if touchingly naive, celluloid sexuality." It concluded: "For all his high-voltage on-stage erotica ... he plays the sullen country boy convincingly ... evincing all the emotion of a well bred head of livestock."

=== Later reviews and evaluation in film guides ===
While it rated the film with two stars out of five, AllMovie defined it as "one of Elvis Presley's liveliest and most interesting early films ... one of the best in (his) output". MSN Movies called it "a streamlined and sanitized retake on the story of Elvis".

Leonard Maltin's Movie Guide rated Loving You with 2½ stars out of 4, the review declared: "Elvis' second movie is highlighted by his performance of 'Teddy Bear' and the title tune". Meanwhile, Steven H. Scheuer's Movies on TV lowered the rating to 2 stars out of 4. Scheuer opined that the film was "tailor-made for Presley and his tunes, the story matters little—too little, if one doesn't dig Elvis". Videohound's Golden Movie Retriever rated it with 2 bones out of 4. Michael Weldon, in Psychotronic Encyclopedia of Film, gave a positive review: "Elvis at his best, top-billed for the first time". Leslie Halliwell, in his Film and Video Guide, felt the opposite, giving zero stars out of 4, and dismissed it as an "empty-headed, glossy star vehicle".

Mick Martin's & Marsha Porter's DVD & Video Guide rated it with 3 stars out of 5. It described it as a "better-than-average Elvis Presley vehicle" and concluded that "the main attraction is Elvis singing his rock 'n' roll songs, including the title tune." Also assigning 3 stars (out of 5), The Motion Picture Guide opined "Loving You is one of Presley's better films. He gives a fine performance, both in the great concert scenes and in the dramatic ones; Hal Kanter directs with vigor".

Filmink wrote "we don’t think Loving You is anyone’s favourite Elvis movie – it is poorly directed and glorifies controlling managers – but it had a lot of good stuff in it, notably the music, a Footloose-style finale, Elvis at his youthful sexy best, and Dolores Hart, who is very winning and sweet."

== See also ==
- List of American films of 1957
