= Lowing =

Lowing is a Scottish surname. Notable people with the surname include:

- Alan Lowing (born 1988), Scottish footballer
- David Lowing (born 1983), Scottish footballer
- John Lowing – Retired British professional wrestler
- Larissa Lowing (born 1973), Canadian artistic gymnast
