= D. J. Fontana =

American drummer (1931–2018)

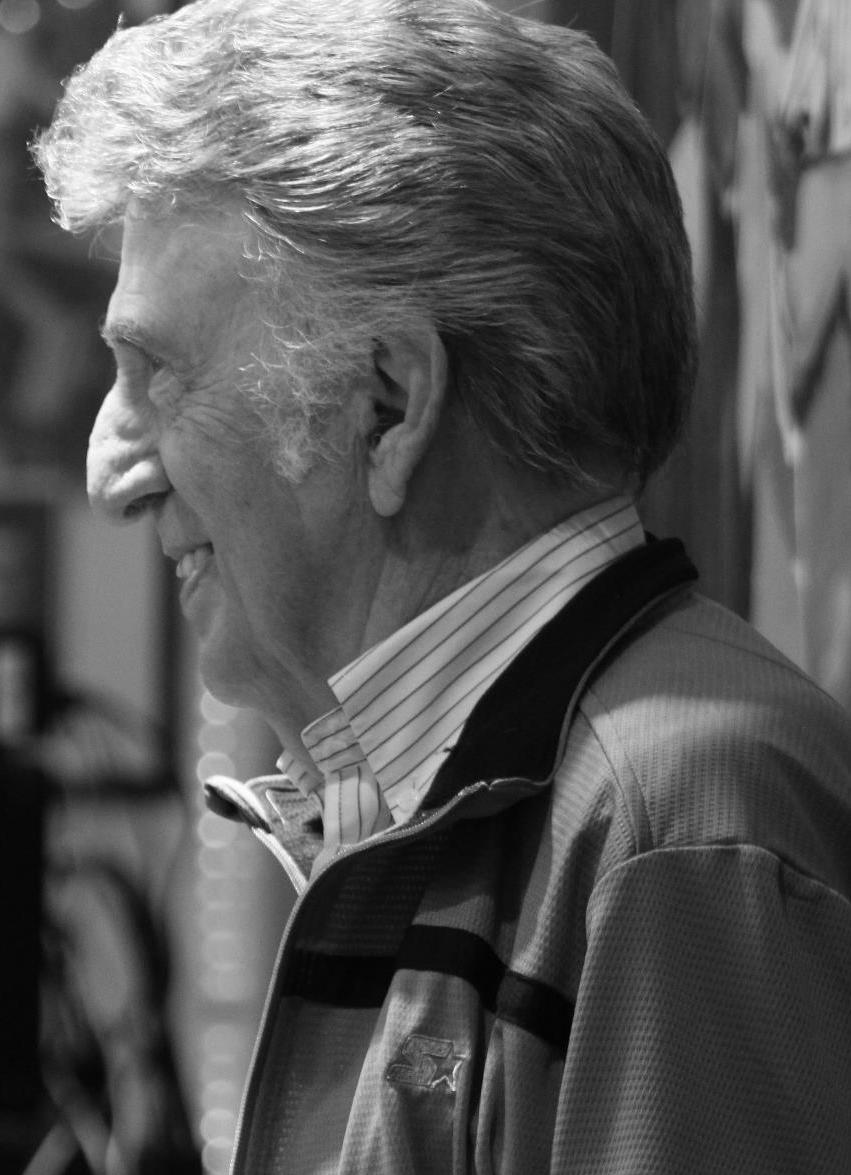
- Fontana in 2012

Background information
- Born: Dominic Joseph Fontana; March 15, 1931; Shreveport, Louisiana, U.S.
- Died: June 13, 2018 (aged 87) Nashville, Tennessee, U.S.
- Genres: Rock and roll; rockabilly; rhythm and blues; country
- Occupation: Drummer
- Years active: Early 1950s – 2018
- Formerly of: The Blue Moon Boys

Dominic Joseph Fontana (March 15, 1931 – June 13, 2018) was an American musician best known as the drummer for Elvis Presley for 14 years. In 1955, he was hired to play drums for Presley, which marked the beginning of a 15-year relationship. He played on over 460 RCA recordings with Elvis.

== Career ==
After serving in Korea with the U.S. Army, Fontana (nicknamed "D.J.") was employed by the Louisiana Hayride to be an in-house drummer on its Saturday night radio broadcast.

Fontana joined a band (originally assembled by Sam Phillips) that was without a drummer and included Scotty Moore (lead guitar), Bill Black (bass), and Elvis Presley (rhythm guitar). They called themselves the Blue Moon Boys. This became the band that would perform and record the vast majority of Presley's hits of the 1950s.

Along with the occasional piano and backing vocals from the Jordanaires, the Blue Moon Boys played on several Elvis hits, including "Heartbreak Hotel", "Hound Dog", "Don't Be Cruel", and "Jailhouse Rock". The band toured extensively. Throughout 1956 and 1957, the band had several television appearances, which included The Ed Sullivan Show. The band broke up in 1958.

Although the band had officially broken up, Fontana, Moore, and Elvis still regularly played and recorded together throughout the 1960s. In 1968, Fontana performed on the NBC television special, often referred to as Elvis' Comeback Special. Fontana played with Elvis for 13 years, from 1955 to 1968.

Stan Lynch said of Fontana: "Armed with accuracy, power, swing, dynamics, great time and — the biggest compliment of all — simplicity whenever it was best, D.J. rocked the greatest singer and the greatest songs ... ever. He did it year after year, record after classic record. In a world of one trick ponies and lucky 'Rock Stars,' D.J. is the real deal."

In 1975, Fontana and Moore reunited to record "E.P. Express" with friend Carl Perkins.

In August 1992, Fontana performed at Ellis Auditorium for a "Good Rockin' Tonight" show alongside Carl Perkins, Moore, the Jordanaires, James Burton, the Sun Rhythm Section, and Ronnie McDowell. They later took this show format on a small tour of England. In 1993, Fontana, Moore, and Carl Perkins performed at a telethon in Jackson, TN. Fontana and Moore also toured Europe with vocalist Bloomer Jenson, organized by the Elvis Presley fan club "It's Elvis Time". In 1994, Fontana, Moore, and Carl Perkins performed at the Jackson telethon again and were joined by McDowell.

In 1997, Fontana and Moore reunited to record the album All the King's Men, featuring guest appearances from the Bill Black Combo, Keith Richards and Ronnie Wood of The Rolling Stones, Jeff Beck, Levon Helm and Jim Weider of The Band, Rick Neilsen of Cheap Trick, and others. In April 1999, Fontana and Moore toured the UK.

In 2001, Fontana and Moore recorded a version of "That's All Right" with Paul McCartney for the documentary Good Rockin' Tonight: The Legacy of Sun Records.

== Other work ==
I learned the value of simplicity at the Hayride. I heard Scotty and Bill and Elvis one night and knew that I couldn't mess up that sound. That's why I always play what I feel. If that won't work, I just won't do it again. I think the simple approach comes from my hearing so much big band music. I mixed it with rockabilly.

— D.J. Fontana

In 1983, Fontana published a book in pictorial form, titled D.J. Fontana Remembers Elvis, detailing his years playing with Elvis. Fontana's Life and Times weekly phonecasting debuted on July 3, 2007.

== Recognition ==
Fontana was inducted into the Rockabilly Hall of Fame on January 14, 2009, and on April 4 that year, he was inducted into the Rock and Roll Hall of Fame, in the "sidemen" category. English musician Wayne Fontana (born Glyn Geoffrey Ellis) took his stage name from the drummer.

Fontana was played by Ed Begley Jr. in the 1979 motion picture Elvis and by Eric William Pierson in the 2005 CBS miniseries Elvis.

== Death ==
Fontana died in his sleep on June 13, 2018, in Nashville at the age of 87. At the time of his death, he was suffering from complications of a broken hip.

== Recordings ==
Unknown recording duet: Robert Hampton and Johnny Paycheck, "I Love My Jesus" Drummer: D.J. Fontana

- "Heartbreak Hotel"/"I Was the One" [2 × Platinum]
- "Blue Suede Shoes"/"Tutti Frutti" [Gold]
- "I Want You, I Need You, I Love You"/"My Baby Left Me" [Platinum]
- "Hound Dog"/"Don't Be Cruel" [4 × Platinum]
- "Love Me Tender"/"Any Way You Want Me" [3 × Platinum]
- "Too Much"/"Playing for Keeps" [Platinum]
- "All Shook Up"/"That's When Your Heartaches Begin" [2 × Platinum]
- "(Let Me Be Your) Teddy Bear"/"Loving You" [2 × Platinum]
- "Jailhouse Rock"/"Treat Me Nice" [2 × Platinum]
- "Don't"/"I Beg of You" [Platinum]
- "Wear My Ring Around Your Neck"/"Doncha' Think It's Time" [Platinum]
- "Hard Headed Woman"/"Don't Ask Me Why" [Platinum]
- "I Got Stung"/"One Night" [Platinum]
- "(Now and Then There's) A Fool Such as I"/"I Need Your Love Tonight" [Platinum]
- "A Big Hunk o' Love"/"My Wish Came True" [Gold]
- "Stuck on You"/"Fame and Fortune" [Platinum]
- "It's Now or Never"/"A Mess of Blues" [Platinum]
- "Are You Lonesome Tonight"/"I Gotta Know" [2 × Platinum]
- "Surrender"/"Lonely Man" [Platinum]
- "I Feel So Bad"/"Wild in the Country" [Gold]
- "(Marie's the Name) His Latest Flame"/"Little Sister" [Gold]
- "Can't Help Falling in Love"/"Rock-A-Hula Baby" [Platinum]
- "Good Luck Charm"/"Anything That's Part of You" [Platinum]
- "She's Not You"/"Just Tell Her Jim Said Hello" [Gold]
- "Return to Sender"/"Where Do You Come From" [Platinum]
- "One Broken Heart For Sale"/"They Remind Me Too Much of You" [Gold]
- "(You're the) Devil in Disguise"/"Please Don't Drag That String Around" [Gold]
- "Bossa Nova Baby"/"Witchcraft" [Gold]
- "Kissin' Cousins"/"It Hurts Me" [Gold]
- "Viva Las Vegas"/"What'd I Say" [Gold]
- "Ain't That Loving You, Baby"/"Ask Me" [Gold]
- "Crying in the Chapel"/"I Believe in the Man in the Sky" [Platinum]
- "I'm Yours"/"Long Lonely Highway" [Gold]
- "Puppet on a String"/"Wooden Heart" [Gold]
- "Blue Christmas"/"Santa Claus Is Back in Town" [Platinum]
- "Tell Me Why"/" Blue River" [Gold]
- "Frankie and Johnny"/"Please Don't Stop Loving Me" [Gold]
