= That's All Right =

1947 single by Arthur Crudup

Single by Arthur Crudup
- A-side: "Crudup's After Hours"
- Released: May 1947
- Recorded: September 4, 1946
- Studio: RCA Studio A, Chicago
- Genre: Rhythm & blues; electric blues
- Length: 2:54
- Label: RCA Victor
- Songwriter: Arthur Crudup

"That's All Right" is a song written and originally performed by the American blues singer Arthur Crudup, and recorded in 1946. It was rereleased in early March 1949 by RCA Victor under the title "That's All Right, Mama", which was issued as RCA's first rhythm and blues record on its new 45 rpm single format.

"That's All Right" is best known as the debut single recorded and released by Elvis Presley. Presley's version was recorded on July 5, 1954, and released on July 19, 1954, with "Blue Moon of Kentucky" as the B-side. It was ranked number 112 on the 2010 Rolling Stone magazine list of the "500 Greatest Songs of All Time". Several critics have cited Presley's version as a candidate for the first rock and roll record. In July 2004, exactly 50 years after it was first released, the song was re-released as a CD single in several countries, including the United Kingdom, where it reached number three.

In 1998, Presley's recording was inducted into the Grammy Hall of Fame.

== History ==
The song was written by Arthur "Big Boy" Crudup, and originally recorded by him in Chicago on September 6, 1946, as "That's All Right". Some of the lyrics are traditional blues verses first recorded by Blind Lemon Jefferson in 1926. Crudup's recording was released as a single in May of 1947 on RCA Victor 20–2205, but was less successful than some of his previous recordings. One of the experts who consider the Crudup recording to be the "first rock and roll song" is Southeastern Louisiana University rock historian Joseph Burns, who adds that "this song could contain the first ever guitar solo break".

At the same session, Crudup recorded a virtually identical tune with different lyrics, "I Don't Know It", which was also released as a single (RCA Victor 20–2307). In early March 1949, the song was rereleased under the title "That's All Right, Mama" (RCA Victor 50–0000), which was issued as RCA's first rhythm and blues record on its new 45 rpm single format, on bright orange vinyl.

Elvis Presley's version was recorded in July 1954. While recording an album as part of a trio called the Blue Moon Boys, the band played "That's All Right" in between takes, and the uptempo style characteristic of rockabilly caught the attention of studio executive Sam Phillips, who asked for a refinement of the interpretation that was later recorded. Its catalogue number was Sun 209. The song was released under its original title, "That's All Right", and names the performers as Elvis Presley, Scotty, and Bill. The Presley version was not identical to Crudup's since it was "at least twice as fast as the original". His version is considered by some music critics as one of the records that was the first in the rock n'roll genre.

Arthur Crudup was credited as the composer on the label of Presley's single, but despite legal battles into the 1970s, reportedly never received royalties. An out-of-court settlement was supposed to pay Crudup an estimated $60,000 in back royalties, but never materialized. Crudup had used lines in his song that had been present in earlier blues recordings, including Blind Lemon Jefferson's 1926 song "That Black Snake Moan". A 2004 article in The Guardian argues that rather than Presley's version being one of the first records of rock and roll, it was simply one of "the first white artists' interpretations of a sound already well-established by black musicians almost a decade before [...] a raucous, driving, unnamed variant of rhythm and blues". A country music version by Marty Robbins peaked at number seven on the Billboard Hot Country Singles chart in 1955.

== Elvis Presley's recording ==
"That's All Right"

Single by Elvis Presley
- B-side: "Blue Moon of Kentucky"
- Released: July 19, 1954
- Recorded: July 5, 1954
- Studio: Sun, Memphis
- Genre: Rockabilly, rock and roll
- Length: 1:57
- Label: Sun (original); RCA Victor (reissue)
- Songwriter: Arthur Crudup
- Producer: Sam Phillips

Elvis Presley singles chronology
"That's All Right" (1954)	"Good Rockin' Tonight" (1954)

Audio sample
- file; help

=== Production ===
On the evening of July 5, 1954, during the Blue Moon Boys' recording session at Sun Studio, Elvis Presley was on acoustic rhythm guitar, Scotty Moore was on electric lead guitar, and Bill Black was on string bass. During a break between recordings, Presley began improvising an up-tempo version of Arthur Crudup's song "That's All Right, Mama". Black, on bass, joined, and the pair was soon joined by Moore's guitar. Producer Sam Phillips was impressed by the upbeat take on the song and asked the three to start again so he could record it.

Presley's first two visits to Sun Studio had been in the summer of 1953 and in January 1954, followed by two more visits in the summer of 1954. This recording session was Presley's fifth visit. Produced in the style of a "live" performance—all parts performed at once and recorded onto one track—the recording contains no drums or additional instruments. Presley's version has lyrics different from Arthur Crudup's version. (In 1986, Sam Phillips recalled that when recording, Elvis changed some lyrics of songs.) The next evening, the trio recorded, in a similar style, "Blue Moon of Kentucky", which became the "That's All Right" single's B-side.

=== Release ===
Sam Phillips gave copies of the acetate to local disc jockeys Dewey Phillips (no relation) of WHBQ, Uncle Richard of WMPS, and Sleepy Eyed John Lepley of WHHM. On July 7, 1954, Dewey Phillips played "That's All Right" on his popular radio show "Red, Hot & Blue". On hearing the news that Dewey was going to play his song, Presley went to the local movie theater to calm his nerves.

Interest in the song was so intense that Dewey reportedly played the acetate 14 times and received over 40 telephone calls. Presley was persuaded to go to the station for an on-air interview that night. Unaware that the microphone was live at the time, Presley answered Dewey's questions, including one about which high school he attended: a roundabout way of informing the audience of Presley's race without actually asking the question. "That's All Right" was officially released on July 19, 1954, and sold around 20,000 copies. This number was not enough to chart nationally, but the single reached number four on the local Memphis charts.

=== 2004 reissue ===
In July 2004, exactly 50 years after its first release, the song was produced and re-released by Will Schillinger as a CD single in several countries. It entered the UK Singles Chart at number three and became a modest hit outside the UK, peaking at number 31 in Australia, number 33 in Ireland, and number 47 in Sweden.

Weekly charts

Chart (2004)	Peak position
Australia (ARIA)	31
Canada (Nielsen SoundScan)	5
Europe (Eurochart Hot 100)	11
Ireland (IRMA)	33
Scottish Singles Sales (Official Charts)	5
Sweden (Sverigetopplistan)	47
UK Singles (Official Charts)	3

Year-end charts

Chart (2004)	Position
UK Singles (OCC)	194

Sales and certifications

Region	Certification	Certified units/sales
United States (RIAA)	Gold	500,000^{^}
^{^} Shipments figures based on certification alone.

== Legacy ==
Rolling Stone magazine argued in a 2004 article that Presley's recording of "That's All Right" was the first rock-and-roll record. "That's All Right" has been recorded by numerous artists in a variety of genres.
