= Lovin =

Lovin is a surname. And also used as name in tribal state of Arunachal Pradesh India. Example Lovin Tamin

Notable people with this surname include:

- Fița Lovin (born 1951), Romanian middle-distance runner
- Florin Lovin (born 1982), Romanian footballer

== See also ==
- Lovins
- Lowin (surname)
- Loving (disambiguation)
- Lovi (disambiguation)
