= Loving You (Elvis Presley song) =

Single by Elvis Presley

from the album Loving You
- A-side: "(Let Me Be Your) Teddy Bear"
- Released: June 11, 1957
- Length: 2:15
- Label: RCA Victor
- Songwriter: Jerry Leiber, Mike Stoller

Elvis Presley singles chronology
"All Shook Up" / "That's When Your Heartaches Begin" (1957)	"Loving You" (1957)	"Treat Me Nice" (1957)

"Loving You" is a song written by Jerry Leiber and Mike Stoller and performed by Elvis Presley with backup vocals provided by the Jordanaires. It reached No. 15 on the U.S. country chart, No. 20 on the U.S. pop chart, and No. 24 on the UK Singles Chart in 1957. It was featured on his 1957 album Loving You. It was featured in Presley's 1957 movie Loving You. The single's A-side, "(Let Me Be Your) Teddy Bear" reached No. 1 on the U.S. pop, country, and R&B charts and No. 3 on the UK Singles Chart in 1957.

== Other versions ==
- Duane Eddy released a version of the song on his 1958 album Have 'Twangy' Guitar Will Travel.
- Chubby Checker and Dee Dee Sharp released a version of the song on their 1962 album Down to Earth.
- The Righteous Brothers released a version of the song on their 1965 album Back to Back.
- Billy Fury released a version of the song as a single in 1967, but it did not chart.
- Françoise Hardy released a version of the song as the B-side to her 1968 single "Will You Love Me Tomorrow".
- Nat Stuckey released a version of the song as a single in 1968, but it did not chart.
- Anita Harris released a version of the song as a single in 1969, but it did not chart.
- The Dave Clark Five released a version of the song as a single as part of a medley in 1971, but it did not chart.
- Donna Fargo featuring The Jordanaires released a version of the song on her 1977 album Shame on Me.
- The Platters released a version of the song on their 1998 album Selection of the Platters.
