= Bill Black =

American bassist (1926–1965)

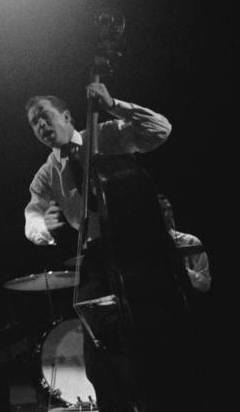
- Bill Black live, 1956

Background information
- Born: William Patton Black Jr. September 17, 1926; Memphis, Tennessee, U.S.
- Died: October 21, 1965 (aged 39) Memphis, Tennessee, U.S.
- Genres: Rock and roll; rockabilly
- Occupations: Bassist, bandleader
- Instruments: Double bass; bass guitar
- Years active: 1952–1965
- Labels: Sun, RCA Victor (Presley); Hi, UK: Felsted, London (Combo)
- Formerly of: Elvis Presley; The Blue Moon Boys; Bill Black's Combo

William Patton Black Jr. (September 17, 1926 – October 21, 1965) was an American musician and bandleader who is noted as one of the pioneers of rock and roll. He played in Elvis Presley's early trio, the Blue Moon Boys. Black later formed Bill Black's Combo.

== Early life and career ==
William Patton Black Jr. was born on September 17, 1926, in Memphis, Tennessee, to a motorman for the Memphis Street Railway Company. He was the oldest of nine children. His father played popular songs on the banjo and fiddle to entertain the family. Black learned to play music at the age of 14 on an instrument made by his father—a cigar box with a board nailed to it and strings attached. At the age of sixteen, Black was performing "honky-tonk" music on acoustic guitar in local bars.

During World War II, Black was stationed with the U.S. Army at Fort Lee in Virginia. While in the Army, he met Evelyn, who played guitar as a member of a musical family. They married in 1946 and returned to Memphis. Black worked at the Firestone plant.

He began playing the upright double bass, modeling his "slap bass" technique after one of his idols, Fred Maddox, of Maddox Brothers and Rose. Black also developed a "stage clown" persona in the same way that Maddox entertained audiences. Black performed as an exaggerated hillbilly with blacked-out teeth, straw hat and overalls. According to his son, Black said his goal was always to give his audience "a few moments of entertainment and maybe a little bit of humor that'll tickle 'em for a while."

In 1952, Black began playing in clubs and on radio shows with the guitarist Scotty Moore. Along with two other guitarists and a fiddler, they performed country music tunes by Hank Williams and Red Foley in Doug Poindexter's band, the Starlight Wranglers. Black and Moore also played in a band with Paul Burlison, Johnny Burnette, Dorsey Burnette on steel guitar, and a drummer.

== The Blue Moon Boys ==
In July 1954, Sam Phillips, of Sun Records, asked Black and Moore to play backup for the as-yet-unknown Elvis Presley. Black slap-played the double bass with Moore on lead guitar, while Presley played rhythm guitar and sang lead. Neither musician was overly impressed with Presley, but they agreed a studio session would be useful to explore his potential.

On July 5, 1954, the trio met at Sun studios to rehearse and record a handful of songs. According to Moore, the first song they recorded was "I Love You Because", but after a few country music songs that weren't impressive they decided to take a break. During the break, Presley began "acting the fool" with Arthur Crudup's "That's All Right (Mama)", a blues song. When the other two musicians joined in, Phillips taped the song. The upbeat sound was original. Black remarked, "Damn. Get that on the radio and they'll run us out of town."

The next day, the group recorded four more songs, including "Blue Moon of Kentucky", by the bluegrass musician Bill Monroe, which he had written and recorded as a slow waltz. Sources credit Black with initiating the song, with Presley and Moore joining in. Moore said, "Bill is the one who came up with "Blue Moon of Kentucky." ... We're taking a little break and he starts beating on the bass and singing "Blue Moon of Kentucky," mocking Bill Monroe, singing the high falsetto voice. Elvis joins in with him, starts playing and singing along with him ..." They ended up with a fast version of the song in 4/4 time. After an early take, Phillips can be heard on tape saying, "Fine, man. Hell, that's different—that's a pop song now, nearly ʼbout."

Phillips took several acetates of the session to DJ Dewey Phillips (no relation) of Memphis radio station WHBQ's Red, Hot and Blue show. From August 18 through December 8, "Blue Moon of Kentucky" was consistently higher on the charts, and then both sides began to chart across the South.

Black and Moore became Presley's backup group and were paid 25% of his earnings. Moore and Black left the Starlite Wranglers after the success of "That's All Right", jealousy within the group forcing them to split. Their recordings at Sun were released with the credits as "Elvis Presley, Scotty and Bill." The group was later billed as "Elvis Presley and the Blue Moon Boys."

Over the next 15 months, the trio released five singles, toured across the South, and appeared regularly on the Louisiana Hayride. They had auditioned for the Grand Ole Opry in October 1954, but they failed to impress the people in charge, or the audience, and were not invited back.

In 1955, Black went to RCA Victor along with Presley and Moore when Presley's contract was sold to that company. Except for the RCA reissue of "Mystery Train" and "I Forgot to Remember to Forget" ("with Scotty and Bill"), they were no longer credited on record labels.

Black played on early Presley recordings including "Good Rockin' Tonight", "Heartbreak Hotel", "Baby Let's Play House", "Mystery Train", "That's All Right", and "Hound Dog", and eventually became one of the first bass players to use the Fender Precision Bass (bass guitar) in popular music, on "Jailhouse Rock", in the late 1950s.

Black, Moore and the drummer D. J. Fontana toured extensively during Presley's early career. Black continued his onstage "clown" persona and developed comedy routines with Presley. Black's onstage personality was a sharp contrast to the introverted stage presence of Moore. The balance fit the group's performances.

Black hams it up on the deck of the USS Hancock during the first appearance on Milton Berle's Texaco Star Theater.

According to Black's son Louis, Moore said, "Elvis used to just stand up there and not move, and Bill would jump around on the bass. Your daddy would come down through there and get everybody to laughing and loosen them up." Fontana called Black the mainstay of the band in the early days. "He was a comedian who could warm up a crowd. That was necessary for us because we played for a lot of country crowds that weren't used to people jumping up and down on stage."

== Bill Black's Combo ==
In 1959, Black joined a group of musicians which became Bill Black's Combo. The lineup was Black (bass), Joe Lewis Hall (piano), Reggie Young (guitar), Martin Willis (saxophone), and Jerry Arnold (drums). There were several personnel changes. While Young was in the army, his position was filled by Hank Hankins, Chips Moman and Tommy Cogbill. On sax, Ace Cannon took over touring duties from Willis who remained in Memphis for the studio work and movie appearances. Carl McVoy replaced Hall in the studio, while Bobby Emmons replaced him on tour.

The band released blues instrumental "Smokie" for Hi Records (Hi 2018) in December 1959. "Smokie, Part 2" became a No. 17 U.S. pop hit, and made number one on the "black" music charts. It sold over one million copies, and was awarded a gold disc by the RIAA. A follow-up release, "White Silver Sands" (Hi 2021), was a Top 10 hit (No. 9) and, like its predecessor, topped the R&B chart for four weeks.

Eight of the recordings by Bill Black's Combo placed in the Top 40 between 1959 and 1962.

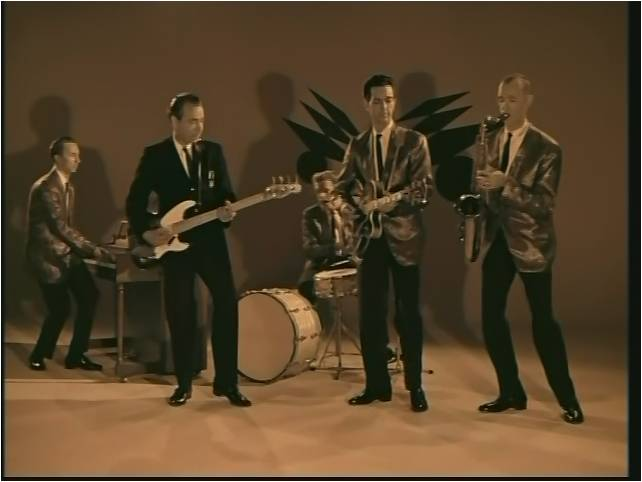
Teenage Millionaire- Bill Black Combo "Yogi"

The Combo appeared in the 1961 film Teenage Millionaire and on The Ed Sullivan Show, where they performed a medley of "Don't Be Cruel", "Cherry Pink", and "Hearts of Stone", and were voted Billboard's number one instrumental group of 1961.

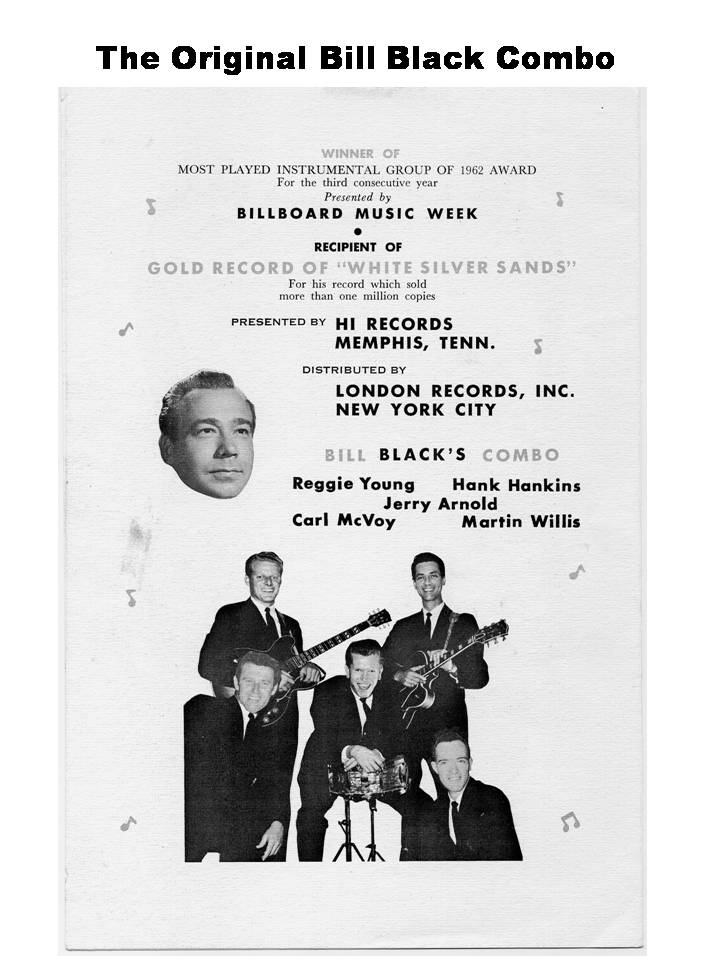
Bill Black Combo Flyer (1962)

Albums with themes included Bill Black's Combo Plays Tunes by Chuck Berry, Bill Black's Combo Goes Big Band, Bill Black's Combo Goes West, and Bill Black's Combo Plays the Blues. The Combo's sound of danceable blues became a popular accompaniment for striptease dancers. Another characteristic of the Combo was Reggie Young thwacking on the guitar with a pencil.

== Lyn-Lou Studios ==
In 1962, Bill Black opened a recording studio called "Lyn-Lou Studios" (a shortened nickname "Linda-Lou" he had for his daughter Nancy), and a record label named "Louis" after his son, on Chelsea Street in Memphis, Tennessee, with Larry Rogers (Studio 19, Nashville) as his engineer and producer. Johnny Black, Bill's brother and also upright bass player, who knew Elvis at Lauderdale Courts before Bill, recalls visiting Bill at the studio and reported that Bill would be totally absorbed mixing and playing back tracks.

Bob Tucker and Larry Rogers purchased Lyn-Lou Studios after Bill Black's death in 1965. The studio recorded many Bill Black Combo albums (with billings such as "The Best Honky Tonk Band in America" and "The band who opened for the Beatles") and produced number-one country hits for Charly McClain, T.G. Shepard, Billy Swan and others. The house band for these sessions was the Shylo Band, featuring guitarist/songwriter Ronnie Scaife, nephew of Cecil Scaife, famed Sun Studio engineer.

Early in 1963, Black sent from two to five different versions of the Combo to different regions of the country at the same time, while staying off the road himself, wanting to concentrate on his business, family and his health.

== Illness and death ==
Black himself had been ill for the past year and a half and unable to travel. Nonetheless, he insisted that the band continue without him. Bill Black's Combo created musical history in 1964 when they became the opening act for the Beatles (at their request) on their historic 13-city tour of America after their appearance on The Ed Sullivan Show. Black himself was not well enough to make the tour.

After two surgeries and lengthy hospital stays, Black died of a brain tumor on October 21, 1965, at age 39. His death occurred during his third operation that doctors had hoped would eradicate the tumor permanently. Black's body was buried next to his father, William Patton Black Sr., at Forest Hill Cemetery in Memphis, Tennessee. Presley was criticized for not attending the funeral, but he believed that his presence would turn it into a media frenzy. He decided instead to visit the family privately after the service to express his condolences. According to Louis Black, Presley said, "If there's anything that y'all need, you just let me know and it's yours."

Black's widow sold Bob Tucker and Larry Rogers the rights to use the name Bill Black's Combo. The band changed to country music when it joined Columbia Records, and won Billboard's Country Instrumental Group of the Year award in 1976.

== Legacy ==
Bill Black's Combo cut more than 20 albums, toured the United States and Europe and won awards as the best instrumental group in America in 1966 and 1967. Bob Tucker worked for the University of Memphis as Professor of Music Business while leading the combo.

Black's main stand-up bass is today owned by ex-Beatle Paul McCartney, who received the instrument as a birthday present from his wife Linda in the late 1970s. The bass can be seen in the video clip to McCartney's song "Baby's Request". In the documentary film In the World Tonight, McCartney can be seen playing it and singing his version of "Heartbreak Hotel". In 1995, he played it on "Real Love", at the time the last "new" Beatles record (one of three in which McCartney, George Harrison and Ringo Starr overdubbed a full arrangement onto a John Lennon home recording from the late 1970s).

Actor Elliott Street portrayed Black in the TV movie Elvis, starring Kurt Russell.

Actor Blake Gibbons portrayed Black in the short-lived 1990 TV series Elvis, starring Michael St. Gerard.

In 2005, Clay Steakley portrayed Black in the 2005 CBS miniseries Elvis, starring Jonathan Rhys Meyers.

In 2007, Black was inducted into the Musicians Hall of Fame and Museum.

On April 4, 2009, Bill Black was inducted into the Rock and Roll Hall of Fame.

In 2020, Rolling Stone ranked Black as 40th greatest bass player of all time.

In 2022, Adam Dunn portrayed Black in the movie Elvis, starring Austin Butler.

== Combo discography ==
=== Albums ===
Year	Title	Chart positions
Year	Title	US 200
1959	Saxy Jazz	—
1960	Solid and Raunchy	23
1960	Let's Twist Her	35
1962	The Untouchable Sound	—
1963	Big Black Combo Goes West	—
1964	Plays Tunes by Chuck Berry	143
1964	Bill Black's Combo Goes Big Band	139
1965	Mr. Beat	—
1965	More Solid & Raunchy	—
1967	Bill Black's Greatest Hits	195
1967	Bill Black's Beat Goes On	—
1969	Solid and Raunchy 3rd	168
1970	Raindrops Keep Fallin on My Head	—
1975	World's Greatest Honky-Tonk Band^{A}	—

- ^{A}Peaked at No. 47 in the Billboard Country Albums chart

=== Singles ===
==== 1960s ====
Year	Title	Chart positions		Album
Year	Title	US	US R&B	Album
1959	"Smokie, Part 2" b/w "Smokie, Part 1" (from Smokie)	17	1	Saxy Jazz
1960	"White Silver Sands" b/w "The Wheel"	9	1	Saxy Jazz
1960	"Josephine" b/w "Dry Bones" (from That Wonderful Feeling)	18	—	Greatest Hits
1960	"Don't Be Cruel" b/w "Rollin'" (from Greatest Hits)	11	9	Solid and Raunchy
1960	"Blue Tango" b/w "Willie"	16	—	Greatest Hits
1961	"Hearts of Stone" b/w "Royal Blue"	20	22	Greatest Hits
1961	"Ole Buttermilk Sky" b/w "Yogi"	25	—	Greatest Hits
1961	"Honky Train" /	92	—	Movin'
1961	"Movin'"	41	—	Movin'
1961	"Twist Her" b/w "My Girl Josephine"	26	—	Let's Twist Her
1962	"Twistin' 'White Silver Sands'" b/w "My Babe"	92	—	Non-album tracks
1962	"So What" b/w "Blues For The Red Boy" (Non-album track)	78	—	The Untouchable Sound of Bill Black's Combo
1962	"Joey's Song" b/w "Hot Taco" (Non-album track)	114	—	The Untouchable Sound of Bill Black's Combo
1963	"Do It – Rat Now" b/w "Little Jasper" (Non-album track)	51	—	Greatest Hits
1963	"Monkey-Shine" b/w "Long Gone"	47	47	Non-album tracks
1964	"Comin' On" b/w "Soft Winds" (Non-album track)	67	—	Bill Black's Combo Plays The Blues
1964	"Tequila" /	91	—	Solid and Raunchy
1964	"Raunchy"	118	—	Solid and Raunchy
1964	"Little Queenie" b/w "Boo-Ray" (Non-album track)	73	—	Bill Black's Combo Plays Tunes By Chuck Berry
1965	"So What" (Recharted) b/w "Blues For The Red Boy" (Non-album track)	89	—	The Untouchable Sound of Bill Black's Combo
1965	"Come On Home" b/w "He'll Have To Go"	124	—	More Solid and Raunchy
1965	"Spootin'" b/w "Crazy Feel" (Non-album track)	135	—	Mr. Beat
1966	"Hey Good Lookin'" b/w "Mountain Of Love"	124	—	All-Timers
1966	"Rambler" b/w "You Call Everybody Darling"	—	—	Black Lace
1967	"Son Of Smokie" b/w "Peg Leg"	—	—	Non-album tracks
1968	"Turn On Your Love Light"^{A} b/w "Ribbon Of Darkness" (from Bill Black's Beat Goes On)	82	—	Turn On Your Love Light
1968	"Bright Lights, Big City" b/w "Red Light" (Non-album track)	—	—	Turn On Your Love Light
1969	"But It's Alright" b/w "Slow Action"	—	—	Black With Sugar
1969	"California Dreamin'" b/w "The Funky Train"	—	—	Black With Sugar
1969	"Creepin' Around" b/w "Son Of Hickory Holler's Tramp"	—	—	Solid and Raunchy The 3rd

- ^{A}Also peaked at No. 82 on Canadian RPM Top Tracks

==== 1970s ====
Year	Title	Chart positions	Album
Year	Title	US Country	Album
1975	"Back Up and Push"	84	World's Greatest Honky-Tonk Band
1975	"Boilin' Cabbage"	29	Bill Black Combo* Featuring Bob Tucker* – Solid & Country
1976	"Fire on the Bayou"	37	World's Greatest Honky-Tonk Band
1976	"Jump Back Joe"	100	World's Greatest Honky-Tonk Band
1976	"Redneck Rock"	89	It's Honky Tonk Time
1978	"Cashin' In (Tribute to Luther Perkins)"	96	Award Winners

== See also ==
- List of bass guitarists
- List of artists who reached number one on the Billboard R&B chart
- List of notable brain tumor patients
