= The Complete Elvis Presley Masters =

Box set by Elvis Presley
- Released: October 19, 2010
- Recorded: July 18, 1953–June 21, 1977
- Genres: Rock and roll; pop; rockabilly; country; blues; gospel; rhythm and blues; Christmas
- Length: 35:09:36
- Labels: RCA; Legacy
- Producer: Ernst Mikael Jørgensen

The Complete Elvis Presley Masters is a box set by American singer Elvis Presley. It was released on October 19, 2010, by RCA Records and Legacy Recordings. The box set covers the majority of Presley's recording career, bringing together all 711 master recordings released during his lifetime.

== Contents ==
Contents of The Complete Elvis Presley Masters.

The box set contains 711 original master recordings as released during Presley's lifetime and 103 additional rare recordings, contained on 30 compact discs. The set omits the recordings made for the 1977 Elvis in Concert TV special and album. The box set also features a 240–page hardcover book with complete discography produced exclusively for this collection, researched and written by Ernst Jørgensen and Peter Guralnick. It includes an individually numbered certificate of authenticity.

This box set should not be confused with the Franklin Mint compilation Elvis: The Complete Masters Collection, which does not contain the rare recordings and lacks the chronological sequencing of the songs but does come with a replica of Elvis's first 7-inch single.

== Track listing ==
Disc 1 (1954–1956)
No.	Title	Writer(s)	Original release	Length
1.	"Harbor Lights"	Jimmy Kennedy; Hugh Williams	Elvis: A Legendary Performer, Vol. 2 (1976)	2:38
2.	"I Love You Because"	Leon Payne	Elvis Presley (1956)	2:42
3.	"That's All Right"	Arthur Crudup	Single A-side (1954)	1:58
4.	"Blue Moon of Kentucky"	Bill Monroe	"That's All Right" B-side (1954)	2:05
5.	"Blue Moon"	Richard Rodgers; Lorenz Hart	Elvis Presley (1956)	2:43
6.	"Tomorrow Night"	Sam Coslow; Will Grosz	The King of Rock 'n' Roll: The Complete 50's Masters (1992)	3:01
7.	"I'll Never Let You Go (Little Darlin')"	Jimmy Wakely	Elvis Presley (1956)	2:26
8.	"I Don't Care If the Sun Don't Shine"	Mack David	"Good Rockin' Tonight" B-side (1954)	2:32
9.	"Just Because"	Bob Shelton; Joe Shelton; Sid Robin	Elvis Presley (1956)	2:34
10.	"Good Rockin' Tonight"	Roy Brown	Single A-side (1954)	2:14
11.	"Milkcow Blues Boogie"	Kokomo Arnold	Single A-side (1955)	2:38
12.	"You're a Heartbreaker"	Jack Sallee	"Milkcow Blues Boogie" B-side (1955)	2:13
13.	"I'm Left, You're Right, She's Gone" (Slow Version)	Stan Kesler; Bill Taylor	A Golden Celebration (1984)	2:42
14.	"Baby Let's Play House"	Arthur Gunter	"I'm Left, You're Right, She's Gone" B-side (1955)	2:18
15.	"I'm Left, You're Right, She's Gone"	Kesler; Taylor	Single A-side (1955)	2:38
16.	"I Forgot to Remember to Forget"	Kesler; Charlie Feathers	Single A-side (1955)	2:31
17.	"Mystery Train"	Junior Parker; Sam Phillips	"I Forgot to Remember to Forget" B-side (1955)	2:30
18.	"Tryin' to Get to You"	Charles Singleton; Rose Marie McCoy	Elvis Presley (1956)	2:34
19.	"When It Rains It Really Pours"	William Emerson	Elvis: A Legendary Performer, Vol. 4 (1983)	2:03
20.	"I Got a Woman"	Ray Charles	Elvis Presley (1956)	2:26
21.	"Heartbreak Hotel"	Mae Boren Axton; Tommy Durden; Elvis Presley	Single A-side (1956)	2:10
22.	"Money Honey"	Jesse Stone	Elvis Presley (1956)	2:37
23.	"I'm Counting on You"	Don Robertson	Elvis Presley (1956)	2:25
24.	"I Was the One"	Aaron Schroeder; Claude Demetrius; Hal Blair; Bill Peppers	"Heartbreak Hotel" B-side (1956)	2:32
Total length:				59:02

Disc 2 (1956)
No.	Title	Writer(s)	Original release	Length
1.	"Blue Suede Shoes"	Carl Perkins	Elvis Presley (1956)	2:01
2.	"My Baby Left Me"	Arthur Crudup	"I Want You, I Need You, I Love You" B-side (1956)	2:14
3.	"One-sided Love Affair"	Bill Campbell	Elvis Presley (1956)	2:12
4.	"So Glad You're Mine"	Crudup	Elvis (1956)	2:22
5.	"I'm Gonna Sit Right Down and Cry (Over You)"	Joe Thomas; Howard Biggs	Elvis Presley (1956)	2:05
6.	"Tutti Frutti"	Dorothy LaBostrie; Richard Penniman	Elvis Presley (1956)	1:59
7.	"Lawdy Miss Clawdy"	Lloyd Price	Elvis Presley (EP) (1956)	2:09
8.	"Shake, Rattle and Roll"	Charles Calhoun	Elvis Presley (EP) (1956)	2:29
9.	"I Want You, I Need You, I Love You"	Maurice Mysels; Ira Kosloff	Single A-side (1956)	2:42
10.	"Hound Dog"	Jerry Leiber; Mike Stoller	Single A-side (1956)	2:18
11.	"Don't Be Cruel"	Otis Blackwell; Elvis Presley	"Hound Dog" B-side (1956)	2:04
12.	"Any Way You Want Me (That's How I Will Be)"	Aaron Schroeder; Cliff Owens	Any Way You Want Me (EP) (1956)	2:15
13.	"We're Gonna Move"	Vera Matson; Presley	Love Me Tender (1956)	2:31
14.	"Love Me Tender"	Matson; Presley	Single A-side (1956)	2:45
15.	"Poor Boy"	Matson; Presley	Love Me Tender (1956)	2:16
16.	"Let Me"	Matson; Presley	Love Me Tender (1956)	2:11
17.	"Playing for Keeps"	Stanley Kesler	"Too Much" B-side (1957)	2:53
18.	"Love Me"	Leiber; Stoller	Elvis (1956)	2:45
19.	"How Do You Think I Feel"	Wayne Walker; Webb Pierce	Elvis (1956)	2:12
20.	"How's The World Treating You"	Chet Atkins; Boudleaux Bryant	Elvis (1956)	2:26
21.	"When My Blue Moon Turns to Gold Again"	Wiley Walker; Gene Sullivan	Elvis (1956)	2:23
22.	"Long Tall Sally"	Robert Blackwell; Enotris Johnson; Penniman	Elvis (1956)	1:54
23.	"Old Shep"	Red Foley	Elvis (1956)	4:11
24.	"Paralyzed"	O. Blackwell; Presley	Elvis (1956)	2:26
25.	"Too Much"	Lee Rosenberg; Leonard Weinman	Single A-side (1957)	2:35
26.	"Anyplace Is Paradise"	Joe Thomas	Elvis (1956)	2:27
27.	"Ready Teddy"	R. Blackwell; John Marascalco	Elvis (1956)	1:57
28.	"First in Line"	Schroeder; Ben Weisman	Elvis (1956)	3:23
29.	"Rip It Up"	R. Blackwell; Marascalco	Elvis (1956)	1:53
Total length:				69:46

Disc 3 (1957)
No.	Title	Writer(s)	Original release	Length
1.	"I Believe"	Ervin Drake; Irvin Graham; Jimmy Shirl; Al Stillman	Peace in the Valley (1957)
2.	"Tell Me Why"	Titus Turner	Single A-side (1965)
3.	"Got a Lot o' Livin' to Do" (from Loving You)	Aaron Schroeder; Ben Weisman	Loving You (1957)
4.	"All Shook Up"	Otis Blackwell; Elvis Presley	Single A-side (1957)
5.	"Mean Woman Blues" (from Loving You)	Claude Demetrius	Loving You (1957)
6.	"(There'll Be) Peace in the Valley (For Me)"	Thomas A. Dorsey	Peace in the Valley (1957)
7.	"That's When Your Heartaches Begin"	Fred Fisher; William Raskin; Billy Hill	"All Shook Up" B-side (1957)
8.	"Take My Hand, Precious Lord"	Dorsey	Peace in the Valley (1957)
9.	"Party" (from Loving You)	Jessie Mae Robinson	Loving You (1957)
10.	"Lonesome Cowboy" (from Loving You)	Sid Tepper; Roy C. Bennett	Loving You (1957)
11.	"(Let Me Be Your) Teddy Bear" (from Loving You)	Kal Mann; Bernie Lowe	Single A-side (1957)
12.	"Hot Dog" (from Loving You)	Jerry Leiber; Mike Stoller	Loving You (1957)
13.	"It Is No Secret (What God Can Do)"	Stuart Hamblen	Peace in the Valley (1957)
14.	"Blueberry Hill"	Vincent Rose; Al Lewis; Larry Stock	Just for You (1957)
15.	"Have I Told You Lately That I Love You?"	Johnny Russell; Scott Wiseman	Just for You (1957)
16.	"Is It So Strange"	Faron Young	Just for You (1957)
17.	"Don't Leave Me Now"	Schroeder; Weisman	Loving You (1957)
18.	"I Beg of You"	Rose Marie McCoy; Cliff Owens	"Don't" B-side (1958)
19.	"One Night"	Dave Bartholomew; Pearl King	Single A-side (1958)
20.	"True Love"	Cole Porter	Loving You (1957)
21.	"I Need You So"	Ivory Joe Hunter	Just for You (1957)
22.	"Loving You" (from Loving You)	Leiber; Stoller	"(Let Me Be Your) Teddy Bear" B-side (1957)
23.	"When It Rains, It Really Pours"	William R. Emerson	Elvis for Everyone! (1965)
24.	"Jailhouse Rock" (from Jailhouse Rock)	Leiber; Stoller	Single A-side (1957)
25.	"Young and Beautiful" (from Jailhouse Rock)	Schroeder; Abner Silver	Jailhouse Rock (1957)
26.	"I Want to Be Free" (from Jailhouse Rock)	Leiber; Stoller	Jailhouse Rock (1957)
27.	"Don't Leave Me Now" (from Jailhouse Rock)	Schroeder; Weisman	Jailhouse Rock (1957)
28.	"(You're So Square) Baby I Don't Care" (from Jailhouse Rock)	Leiber; Stoller	Jailhouse Rock (1957)
Total length:				66:51

Disc 4 (1957–1958)
No.	Title	Original Release	Length
1.	"Treat Me Nice" (from Jailhouse Rock)	"Jailhouse Rock" B-side
2.	"Blue Christmas"	Elvis' Christmas Album
3.	"My Wish Came True"	"A Big Hunk O' Love" B-side
4.	"White Christmas"	Elvis' Christmas Album
5.	"Here Comes Santa Claus (Right Down Santa Claus Lane)"	Elvis' Christmas Album
6.	"Silent Night"	Elvis' Christmas Album
7.	"Don't"	Single A-side
8.	"O Little Town of Bethlehem"	Elvis' Christmas Album
9.	"Santa Bring My Baby Back (To Me)"	Elvis' Christmas Album
10.	"Santa Claus Is Back in Town"	Elvis' Christmas Album
11.	"I'll Be Home for Christmas"	Elvis' Christmas Album
12.	"Hard Headed Woman" (from King Creole)	Single A-side
13.	"Trouble" (from King Creole)	King Creole
14.	"New Orleans" (from King Creole)	King Creole
15.	"Crawfish" (with Kitty White) (from King Creole)	King Creole
16.	"Dixieland Rock" (from King Creole)	King Creole
17.	"Lover Doll" (from King Creole)	King Creole
18.	"Don't Ask Me Why" (from King Creole)	"Hard Headed Woman" B-side
19.	"As Long as I Have You" (from King Creole)	King Creole
20.	"King Creole" (from King Creole)	King Creole
21.	"Young Dreams" (from King Creole)	King Creole
22.	"Steadfast, Loyal and True" (from King Creole)	King Creole
23.	"Danny" (Outtake from King Creole)	Elvis: A Legendary Performer, Vol. 3
24.	"Doncha' Think It's Time" (Single Master)	"Wear My Ring Around Your Neck" B-side
25.	"Your Cheatin' Heart"	Elvis for Everyone
26.	"Wear My Ring Around Your Neck"	Single A-side
27.	"I Need Your Love Tonight"	"(Now and Then There's) A Fool Such As I" B-side
28.	"A Big Hunk o' Love"	Single A-side
29.	"Ain't That Lovin' You, Baby"	"Ask Me" B-side
30.	"(Now and Then There's) A Fool Such as I"	Single A-side
31.	"I Got Stung"	"One Night" B-side
Total length:			67:29

Disc 5 (1960)
No.	Title	Original Release	Length
1.	"Make Me Know It"	Elvis Is Back!
2.	"Soldier Boy"	Elvis Is Back!
3.	"Stuck On You"	Single A-side
4.	"Fame and Fortune"	"Stuck On You" B-side
5.	"A Mess of Blues"	"It's Now Or Never" B-side
6.	"It Feels So Right"	Elvis Is Back!
7.	"Fever"	Elvis Is Back!
8.	"Like A Baby"	Elvis Is Back!
9.	"It's Now Or Never"	Single A-side
10.	"The Girl of My Best Friend"	Elvis Is Back!
11.	"Dirty, Dirty Feeling"	Elvis Is Back!
12.	"Thrill of Your Love"	Elvis Is Back!
13.	"I Gotta Know"	"Are You Lonesome Tonight?" B-side
14.	"Such a Night"	Elvis Is Back!
15.	"Are You Lonesome Tonight?"	Single A-side
16.	"Girl Next Door Went A-Walking"	Elvis Is Back!
17.	"I Will Be Home Again"	Elvis Is Back!
18.	"Reconsider Baby"	Elvis Is Back!
19.	"Didja' Ever"	G.I. Blues
20.	"Doin' The Best I Can"	G.I. Blues
21.	"G.I. Blues"	G.I. Blues
22.	"Tonight Is So Right For Love"	G.I. Blues
23.	"What's She Really Like"	G.I. Blues
24.	"Blue Suede Shoes"	G.I. Blues
25.	"Wooden Heart"	G.I. Blues
26.	"Shoppin' Around"	G.I. Blues
27.	"Pocketful of Rainbows"	G.I. Blues
28.	"Frankfort Special"	G.I. Blues
29.	"Tonight's All Right For Love"	Elvis: A Legendary Performer, Vol. 1
30.	"Big Boots"	G.I. Blues
Total length:			76:47

Disc 6 (1960–1961)
No.	Title	Original Release	Length
1.	"Summer Kisses, Winter Tears"	Elvis By Request (EP)
2.	"Britches"	Elvis: A Legendary Performer, Vol. 3
3.	"A Cane And A High Starched Collar"	Elvis: A Legendary Performer, Vol. 2
4.	"Flaming Star"	Elvis By Request (EP)
5.	"Milky White Way"	His Hand in Mine
6.	"His Hand In Mine"	His Hand in Mine
7.	"I Believe In The Man In The Sky"	His Hand in Mine
8.	"He Knows Just What I Need"	His Hand in Mine
9.	"Surrender"	Single A-side
10.	"Mansion Over the Hilltop"	His Hand in Mine
11.	"In My Father's House"	His Hand in Mine
12.	"Joshua Fit the Battle"	His Hand in Mine
13.	"Swing Down Sweet Chariot"	His Hand in Mine
14.	"I'm Gonna Walk Dem Golden Stairs"	His Hand in Mine
15.	"If We Never Meet Again"	His Hand in Mine
16.	"Known Only To Him"	His Hand in Mine
17.	"Crying In the Chapel"	Single A-side
18.	"Working on the Building"	His Hand in Mine
19.	"Lonely Man"	"Surrender" B-side
20.	"In My Way"	Elvis for Everyone
21.	"Wild in the Country"	"I Feel So Bad" B-side
22.	"Forget Me Never"	Elvis for Everyone
23.	"I Slipped, I Stumbled, I Fell"	Something for Everybody
24.	"I'm Comin' Home"	Something for Everybody
25.	"Gently"	Something for Everybody
26.	"In Your Arms"	Something for Everybody
27.	"Give Me The Right"	Something for Everybody
28.	"I Feel So Bad"	Single A-side
29.	"It's a Sin"	Something for Everybody
30.	"I Want You With Me"	Something for Everybody
31.	"There's Always Me"	Something for Everybody
32.	"Starting Today"	Something for Everybody
33.	"Sentimental Me"	Something for Everybody
34.	"Judy"	Something for Everybody
35.	"Put The Blame On Me"	Something for Everybody
Total length:			78:51

Disc 7 (1961)
No.	Title	Original Release	Length
1.	"Hawaiian Sunset"	Blue Hawaii
2.	"Aloha Oe"	Blue Hawaii
3.	"Ku-U-I-Po"	Blue Hawaii
4.	"No More"	Blue Hawaii
5.	"Slicin' Sand"	Blue Hawaii
6.	"Blue Hawaii"	Blue Hawaii
7.	"Ito Eats"	Blue Hawaii
8.	"Hawaiian Wedding Song"	Blue Hawaii
9.	"Island Of Love"	Blue Hawaii
10.	"Steppin' Out Of Line"	Pot Luck
11.	"Almost Always True"	Blue Hawaii
12.	"Moonlight Swim"	Blue Hawaii
13.	"Can't Help Falling In Love"	Blue Hawaii
14.	"Beach Boy Blues"	Blue Hawaii
15.	"Rock-A-Hula Baby"	Blue Hawaii
16.	"Kiss Me Quick"	Pot Luck
17.	"That's Someone You Never Forget"	Pot Luck
18.	"I'm Yours"	Pot Luck
19.	"(Marie's the Name) His Latest Flame"	Single A-side
20.	"Little Sister"	"(Marie's The Name) His Latest Flame" B-side
21.	"For The Millionth And The Last Time"	Elvis for Everyone
22.	"Good Luck Charm"	Single A-side
23.	"Anything That's Part Of You"	"Good Luck Charm" B-side
24.	"I Met Her Today"	Elvis for Everyone
25.	"Night Rider"	Pot Luck
26.	"Angel"	Follow That Dream (EP)
27.	"Follow That Dream"	Follow That Dream (EP)
28.	"What A Wonderful Life"	Follow That Dream (EP)
29.	"I'm Not The Marrying Kind"	Follow That Dream (EP)
30.	"Sound Advice"	Elvis for Everyone
Total length:			69:19

Disc 8 (1961–1962)
No.	Title	Original Release	Length
1.	"A Whistling Tune"	Kid Galahad (EP)
2.	"Home Is Where The Heart Is"	Kid Galahad (EP)
3.	"Riding The Rainbow"	Kid Galahad (EP)
4.	"I Got Lucky"	Kid Galahad (EP)
5.	"This Is Living"	Kid Galahad (EP)
6.	"King Of The Whole Wide World"	Kid Galahad (EP)
7.	"Something Blue"	Pot Luck
8.	"Gonna Get Back Home Somehow"	Pot Luck
9.	"(Such An) Easy Question"	Pot Luck
10.	"Fountain Of Love"	Pot Luck
11.	"Just For Old Time Sake"	Pot Luck
12.	"You'll Be Gone"	"Do The Clam" B-side
13.	"I Feel That I've Known You Forever"	Pot Luck
14.	"Just Tell Her Jim Said Hello"	"She's Not You" B-side
15.	"Suspicion"	Pot Luck
16.	"She's Not You"	Single A-side
17.	"I Don't Want To"	Girls! Girls! Girls!
18.	"We're Coming In Loaded"	Girls! Girls! Girls!
19.	"Thanks to the Rolling Sea"	Girls! Girls! Girls!
20.	"Where Do You Come From"	"Return To Sender" B-side
21.	"Girls! Girls! Girls!"	Girls! Girls! Girls!
22.	"Return to Sender"	Single A-side
23.	"Because of Love"	Girls! Girls! Girls!
24.	"The Walls Have Ears"	Girls! Girls! Girls!
25.	"Song of the Shrimp"	Girls! Girls! Girls!
26.	"A Boy Like Me, a Girl Like You"	Girls! Girls! Girls!
27.	"Mama"	Let's Be Friends
28.	"Earth Boy"	Girls! Girls! Girls!
29.	"Dainty Little Moonbeams"
30.	"Girls! Girls! Girls! Finale"
31.	"I Don't Wanna Be Tied"	Girls! Girls! Girls!
32.	"Plantation Rock"	Elvis: A Legendary Performer, Vol. 4
33.	"We'll Be Together"	Girls! Girls! Girls!
Total length:			69:26

Disc 9 (1962–1963)
No.	Title	Original Release	Length
1.	"Happy Ending"	It Happened at the World's Fair
2.	"Relax"	It Happened at the World's Fair
3.	"I'm Falling In Love Tonight"	It Happened at the World's Fair
4.	"They Remind Me Too Much Of You"	"One Broken Heart For Sale" B-side
5.	"Cotton Candy Land"	It Happened at the World's Fair
6.	"A World Of Our Own"	It Happened at the World's Fair
7.	"How Would You Like To Be"	It Happened at the World's Fair
8.	"One Broken Heart for Sale"	Single A-side
9.	"Beyond The Bend"	It Happened at the World's Fair
10.	"Take Me To The Fair"	It Happened at the World's Fair
11.	"Bossa Nova Baby"	Single A-side
12.	"I Think I'm Gonna Like It Here"	Fun in Acapulco
13.	"Mexico"	Fun in Acapulco
14.	"The Bullfighter Was A Lady"	Fun in Acapulco
15.	"Marguerita"	Fun in Acapulco
16.	"Vino, Dinero Y Amor"	Fun in Acapulco
17.	"(There's) No Room To Rhumba In A Sports Car"	Fun in Acapulco
18.	"Fun In Acapulco"	Fun in Acapulco
19.	"El Toro"	Fun in Acapulco
20.	"You Can't Say No In Acapulco"	Fun in Acapulco
21.	"Guadalajara"	Fun in Acapulco
22.	"Echoes Of Love"	Kissin' Cousins
23.	"Please Don't Drag That String Around"	"(You're the) Devil in Disguise" B-side
24.	"(You're the) Devil in Disguise"	Single A-side
25.	"Never Ending"	"Such A Night" B-side
26.	"What Now, What Next, Where To"	Double Trouble
27.	"Witchcraft"	"Bossa Nova Baby" B-side
28.	"Finders Keepers, Losers Weepers"	Elvis for Everyone
29.	"Love Me Tonight"	Fun in Acapulco
30.	"(It's A) Long Lonely Highway"	Kissin' Cousins
31.	"Western Union"	Speedway
32.	"Slowly But Surely"	Fun in Acapulco
33.	"Blue River"	"Tell Me Why" B-side
Total length:			73:23

Disc 10 (1963–1964)
No.	Title	Original Release	Length
1.	"Night Life"	Elvis Sings Flaming Star
2.	"C'mon Everybody"	Viva Las Vegas (EP)
3.	"If You Think I Don't Need You"	Viva Las Vegas (EP)
4.	"I Need Somebody To Lean On"	Viva Las Vegas (EP)
5.	"Do The Vega"	Elvis Sings Flaming Star
6.	"Viva Las Vegas"	"What'd I Say" B-side
7.	"Yellow Rose Of Texas / The Eyes Of Texas"	Elvis Sings Flaming Star
8.	"The Lady Loves Me"	Elvis: A Legendary Performer, Vol. 4
9.	"You're The Boss"	Sings Leiber & Stoller
10.	"Today, Tomorrow And Forever"	Viva Las Vegas (EP)
11.	"Santa Lucia"	Elvis for Everyone
12.	"What'd I Say"	Single A-side
13.	"Once Is Enough"	Kissin' Cousins
14.	"Catchin' On Fast"	Kissin' Cousins
15.	"Anyone (Could Fall In Love With You)"	Kissin' Cousins
16.	"Smokey Mountain Boy"	Kissin' Cousins
17.	"There's Gold In The Mountains"	Kissin' Cousins
18.	"One Boy Two Little Girls"	Kissin' Cousins
19.	"Kissin' Cousins"	Single A-side
20.	"Barefoot Ballad"	Kissin' Cousins
21.	"Kissin' Cousins (Number 2)"	Kissin' Cousins
22.	"Tender Feeling"	Kissin' Cousins
23.	"Memphis, Tennessee"	Elvis for Everyone
24.	"Ask Me"	Single A-side
25.	"It Hurts Me"	"Kissin' Cousins" B-side
Total length:			60:05

Disc 11 (1964–1965)
No.	Title	Original Release	Length
1.	"Little Egypt"	Roustabout
2.	"Poison Ivy League"	Roustabout
3.	"Hard Knocks"	Roustabout
4.	"It's A Wonderful World"	Roustabout
5.	"Big Love Big Heartache"	Roustabout
6.	"One Track Heart"	Roustabout
7.	"It's Carnival Time"	Roustabout
8.	"Carny Town"	Roustabout
9.	"There's A Brand New Day On The Horizon"	Roustabout
10.	"Wheels On My Heels"	Roustabout
11.	"Roustabout"	Roustabout
12.	"Puppet on a String"	Girl Happy
13.	"The Meanest Girl In Town"	Girl Happy
14.	"Girl Happy"	Girl Happy
15.	"Cross My Heart And Hope To Die"	Girl Happy
16.	"Spring Fever"	Girl Happy
17.	"Do Not Disturb"	Girl Happy
18.	"I've Got To Find My Baby"	Girl Happy
19.	"Fort Lauderdale Chamber Of Commerce"	Girl Happy
20.	"Startin' Tonight"	Girl Happy
21.	"Do the Clam"	Single A-side
22.	"Wolf Call"	Girl Happy
23.	"Shake That Tambourine"	Harum Scarum
24.	"So Close, Yet So Far (From Paradise)"	Harum Scarum
25.	"My Desert Serenade"	Harum Scarum
26.	"Wisdom Of The Ages"	Harum Scarum
27.	"Kismet"	Harum Scarum
28.	"Hey Little Girl"	Harum Scarum
29.	"Golden Coins"	Harum Scarum
30.	"Animal Instinct"	Harum Scarum
31.	"Harem Holiday"	Harum Scarum
32.	"Go East, Young Man"	Harum Scarum
33.	"Mirage"	Harum Scarum
Total length:			67:04

Disc 12 (1965–1966)
No.	Title	Original Release	Length
1.	"Come Along"	Frankie and Johnny
2.	"Beginner's Luck"	Frankie and Johnny
3.	"Down By The Riverside And When The Saints Go Marching In"	Frankie and Johnny
4.	"Please Don't Stop Loving Me"	"Frankie and Johnny" B-side
5.	"Shout It Out"	Frankie and Johnny
6.	"What Every Woman Lives For"	Frankie and Johnny
7.	"Hard Luck"	Frankie and Johnny
8.	"Petunia, The Gardener's Daughter"	Frankie and Johnny
9.	"Look Out, Broadway"	Frankie and Johnny
10.	"Everybody Come Aboard"	Frankie and Johnny
11.	"Chesay"	Frankie and Johnny
12.	"Frankie And Johnny"	Single A-side
13.	"Drums Of The Islands"	Paradise, Hawaiian Style
14.	"Datin'"	Paradise, Hawaiian Style
15.	"Scratch My Back"	Paradise, Hawaiian Style
16.	"Stop Where You Are"	Paradise, Hawaiian Style
17.	"A Dog's Life"	Paradise, Hawaiian Style
18.	"This Is My Heaven"	Paradise, Hawaiian Style
19.	"Paradise, Hawaiian Style"	Paradise, Hawaiian Style
20.	"House of Sand"	Paradise, Hawaiian Style
21.	"Queenie Wahine's Papaya"	Paradise, Hawaiian Style
22.	"Sand Castles"	Paradise, Hawaiian Style
23.	"Smorgasbord"	Spinout
24.	"Stop, Look And Listen"	Spinout
25.	"Am I Ready"	Spinout
26.	"Beach Shack"	Spinout
27.	"Never Say Yes"	Spinout
28.	"Spinout"	Single A-side
29.	"All That I Am"	"Spinout" B-side
30.	"Adam And Evil"	Spinout
31.	"I'll Be Back"	Spinout
Total length:			67:44

Disc 13 (1966)
No.	Title	Original Release	Length
1.	"Run On"	How Great Thou Art
2.	"How Great Thou Art"	How Great Thou Art
3.	"Stand By Me"	How Great Thou Art
4.	"Where No One Stands Alone"	How Great Thou Art
5.	"Down in the Alley"	Spinout
6.	"Tomorrow Is A Long Time"	Spinout
7.	"Love Letters"	Single A-side
8.	"So High"	How Great Thou Art
9.	"Farther Along"	How Great Thou Art
10.	"By And By"	How Great Thou Art
11.	"In The Garden"	How Great Thou Art
12.	"Beyond The Reef"	Elvis Aron Presley
13.	"Somebody Bigger Than You And I"	How Great Thou Art
14.	"Without Him"	How Great Thou Art
15.	"If The Lord Wasn't Walking By My Side"	How Great Thou Art
16.	"Where Could I Go But To The Lord"	How Great Thou Art
17.	"Come What May"	"Love Letters" B-side
18.	"Fools Fall In Love"	"Indescribably Blue" B-side
19.	"Indescribably Blue"	Single A-side
20.	"I'll Remember You"	Spinout
21.	"If Everyday Was Like Christmas"	Single A-side
Total length:			58:59

Disc 14 (1966–1967)
No.	Title	Original Release	Length
1.	"City By Night"	Double Trouble
2.	"Could I Fall In Love"	Double Trouble
3.	"There Is So Much World To See"	Double Trouble
4.	"Double Trouble"	Double Trouble
5.	"Baby, If You'll Give Me All Of Your Love"	Double Trouble
6.	"I Love Only One Girl"	Double Trouble
7.	"It Won't Be Long"	Double Trouble
8.	"Old MacDonald"	Double Trouble
9.	"Long Legged Girl (with the Short Dress On)"	Single A-side
10.	"Easy Come, Easy Go"	Easy Come, Easy Go (EP)
11.	"I'll Take Love"	Easy Come, Easy Go (EP)
12.	"Sing You Children"	Easy Come, Easy Go (EP)
13.	"She's a Machine"	Elvis Sings Flaming Star
14.	"The Love Machine"	Easy Come, Easy Go (EP)
15.	"Yoga Is As Yoga Does"	Easy Come, Easy Go (EP)
16.	"You Gotta Stop"	Easy Come, Easy Go (EP)
17.	"The Girl I Never Loved"	Clambake
18.	"How Can You Lose What You Never Had"	Clambake
19.	"You Don't Know Me"	Clambake
20.	"A House That Has Everything"	Clambake
21.	"Who Needs Money?"	Clambake
22.	"Confidence"	Clambake
23.	"Hey, Hey, Hey"	Clambake
24.	"Clambake"	Clambake
25.	"Suppose"	Speedway
Total length:			56:19

Disc 15 (1967–1968)
No.	Title	Original Release	Length
1.	"There Ain't Nothing Like A Song" (duet with Nancy Sinatra)	Speedway
2.	"Your Time Hasn't Come Yet, Baby"	Single A-side
3.	"Five Sleepy Heads"	Speedway
4.	"Who Are You? (Who Am I?)"	Speedway
5.	"Speedway"	Speedway
6.	"Suppose"	Speedway
7.	"Let Yourself Go"	"Your Time Hasn't Come Yet Baby" B-side
8.	"He's Your Uncle Not Your Dad"	Speedway
9.	"Guitar Man"	Clambake
10.	"Big Boss Man"	Single A-side
11.	"Mine"	Speedway
12.	"Just Call Me Lonesome"	Clambake
13.	"Hi-Heel Sneakers"	"Guitar Man" B-side
14.	"You Don't Know Me"	"Big Boss Man" B-side
15.	"We Call On Him"	"You'll Never Walk Alone" B-side
16.	"You'll Never Walk Alone"	Single A-side
17.	"Singing Tree"	Clambake
18.	"Stay Away, Joe"	Let's Be Friends
19.	"All I Needed Was The Rain"	Elvis Sings Flaming Star
20.	"Dominic"	Double Features: Kissin' Cousins/Clambake/Stay Away, Joe (1994)
21.	"Too Much Monkey Business"	Elvis Sings Flaming Star
22.	"Goin' Home"	Speedway
23.	"Stay Away"	"U.S. Male" B-side
24.	"U.S. Male"	Single A-side
25.	"Wonderful World"	Elvis Sings Flaming Star
26.	"Edge of Reality"	"If I Can Dream" B-side
27.	"A Little Less Conversation"	"Almost in Love" B-side
28.	"Almost in Love"	Single A-side
Total length:			67:14

Disc 16 (1968)
No.	Title	Original Release	Length
1.	"Medley: Nothingville/Big Boss Man/Guitar Man/Little Egypt/Trouble/Guitar Man"	Elvis (NBC TV Special)
2.	"Where Could I Go But To The Lord/Up Above My Head/Saved"	Elvis (NBC TV Special)
3.	"Trouble/Guitar Man"	Elvis (NBC TV Special)
4.	"If I Can Dream"	Single A-side
5.	"Memories"	Elvis (NBC TV Special)
6.	"Blue Christmas / One Night"	Elvis (NBC TV Special)
7.	"Tiger Man"	Elvis Sings Flaming Star
8.	"Lawdy, Miss Clawdy / Baby, What You Want Me To Do Medley: Heartbreak Hotel / Hound Dog / All Shook Up / Can't Help Falling In Love / Jailhouse Rock / Love Me Tender"	Elvis (NBC TV Special)
9.	"Let's Forget About The Stars"	Let's Be Friends
10.	"Charro"	"Memories" B-side
11.	"Clean Up Your Own Back Yard"	Single A-side
12.	"Swing Down Sweet Chariot"	Elvis: A Legendary Performer, Vol. 4
13.	"Signs Of The Zodiac"
14.	"Almost"	Let's Be Friends
15.	"The Whiffenpoof Song"
16.	"Violet"
Total length:			63:22

Disc 17 (1969)
No.	Title	Original Release	Length
1.	"Long Black Limousine"	From Elvis in Memphis
2.	"This Is The Story"	From Memphis to Vegas/From Vegas to Memphis
3.	"Wearin' That Loved On Look"	From Elvis in Memphis
4.	"You'll Think Of Me"	"Suspicious Minds" B-side
5.	"I'm Movin' On"	From Elvis in Memphis
6.	"A Little Bit Of Green"	From Memphis to Vegas/From Vegas to Memphis
7.	"Gentle on My Mind"	From Elvis in Memphis
8.	"Don't Cry Daddy"	Single A-side
9.	"Inherit The Wind"	From Memphis to Vegas/From Vegas to Memphis
10.	"Mama Liked the Roses"	"The Wonder of You" B-side
11.	"My Little Friend"	"Kentucky Rain" B-side
12.	"In the Ghetto"	Single A-side
13.	"Rubberneckin'"	"Don't Cry Daddy" B-side
14.	"Hey Jude"	Elvis Now
15.	"From a Jack to a King"	From Memphis to Vegas/From Vegas to Memphis
16.	"Without Love (There Is Nothing)"	From Memphis to Vegas/From Vegas to Memphis
17.	"I'll Hold You In My Heart (Till I Can Hold You In My Arms)"	From Elvis in Memphis
18.	"I'll Be There"	Let's Be Friends
19.	"Suspicious Minds"	Single A-side
20.	"Stranger In My Own Home Town"	From Memphis to Vegas/From Vegas to Memphis
21.	"True Love Travels On A Gravel Road"	From Elvis in Memphis
22.	"And The Grass Won't Pay No Mind"	From Memphis to Vegas/From Vegas to Memphis
Total length:			71:03

Disc 18 (1969)
No.	Title	Original Release	Length
1.	"Power Of My Love"	From Elvis in Memphis
2.	"After Loving You"	From Elvis in Memphis
3.	"Do You Know Who I Am?"	From Memphis to Vegas/From Vegas to Memphis
4.	"Kentucky Rain"	Single A-side
5.	"Only The Strong Survive"	From Elvis in Memphis
6.	"It Keeps Right On a-Hurtin'"	From Elvis in Memphis
7.	"Any Day Now"	"In The Ghetto" B-side
8.	"If I'm A Fool (For Loving You)"	Let's Be Friends
9.	"The Fair's Moving On"	"Clean Up Your Own Back Yard" B-side
10.	"Who Am I?"	You'll Never Walk Alone
11.	"Change Of Habit"	Let's Be Friends
12.	"Let's Be Friends"	Let's Be Friends
13.	"Let Us Pray"	You'll Never Walk Alone
14.	"Have A Happy"	Let's Be Friends
15.	"Blue Suede Shoes"	From Memphis to Vegas/From Vegas to Memphis
16.	"Johnny B. Goode"	From Memphis to Vegas/From Vegas to Memphis
17.	"All Shook Up"	From Memphis to Vegas/From Vegas to Memphis
18.	"Are You Lonesome Tonight?"	From Memphis to Vegas/From Vegas to Memphis
19.	"Hound Dog"	From Memphis to Vegas/From Vegas to Memphis
20.	"I Can't Stop Loving You"	From Memphis to Vegas/From Vegas to Memphis
21.	"My Babe"	From Memphis to Vegas/From Vegas to Memphis
22.	"Mystery Train/Tiger Man"	From Memphis to Vegas/From Vegas to Memphis
23.	"Words"	From Memphis to Vegas/From Vegas to Memphis
24.	"In the Ghetto"	From Memphis to Vegas/From Vegas to Memphis
25.	"Suspicious Minds"	From Memphis to Vegas/From Vegas to Memphis
26.	"Can't Help Falling In Love"	From Memphis to Vegas/From Vegas to Memphis
Total length:			77:44

Disc 19 (1970)
No.	Title	Original Release	Length
1.	"See See Rider"	On Stage
2.	"Release Me"	On Stage
3.	"Sweet Caroline"	On Stage
4.	"Runaway"	On Stage
5.	"The Wonder Of You"	Single A-side
6.	"Polk Salad Annie"	On Stage
7.	"Yesterday"	On Stage
8.	"Proud Mary"	On Stage
9.	"Walk A Mile In My Shoes"	On Stage
10.	"Let It Be Me"	On Stage
11.	"Twenty Days And Twenty Nights"	That's the Way It Is
12.	"I've Lost You"	Single A-side
13.	"I Was Born About Ten Thousand Years Ago"	Elvis Now
14.	"The Sound Of Your Cry"	"It's Only Love" B-side
15.	"The Fool"	Elvis Country (I'm 10,000 Years Old)
16.	"Little Cabin On The Hill"	Elvis Country (I'm 10,000 Years Old)
17.	"Cindy, Cindy"	Love Letters from Elvis
18.	"Bridge Over Troubled Water"	That's the Way It Is
19.	"Got My Mojo Working / Keep Your Hands Off Of It"	Love Letters from Elvis
20.	"How The Web Was Woven"	That's the Way It Is
21.	"It's Your Baby, You Rock It"	Elvis Country (I'm 10,000 Years Old)
22.	"Stranger In The Crowd"	That's the Way It Is
23.	"I'll Never Know"	Love Letters from Elvis
24.	"Mary In The Morning"	That's the Way It Is
Total length:			78:18

Disc 20 (1970)
No.	Title	Original Release	Length
1.	"It Ain't No Big Thing (But It's Growing)"	Love Letters from Elvis
2.	"You Don't Have to Say You Love Me"	Single A-side
3.	"Just Pretend"	That's the Way It Is
4.	"This Is Our Dance"	Love Letters from Elvis
5.	"Life"	Single A-side
6.	"Heart Of Rome"	Love Letters from Elvis
7.	"When I'm Over You"	Love Letters from Elvis
8.	"I Really Don't Want to Know"	Single A-side
9.	"Faded Love"	Elvis Country (I'm 10,000 Years Old)
10.	"Tomorrow Never Comes"	Elvis Country (I'm 10,000 Years Old)
11.	"The Next Step Is Love"	"I've Lost You" B-side
12.	"Make the World Go Away"	Elvis Country (I'm 10,000 Years Old)
13.	"Funny How Time Slips Away"	Elvis Country (I'm 10,000 Years Old)
14.	"I Washed My Hands In Muddy Water"	Elvis Country (I'm 10,000 Years Old)
15.	"Love Letters"	Love Letters from Elvis
16.	"There Goes My Everything"	"I Really Don't Want To Know" B-side
17.	"If I Were You"	Love Letters from Elvis
18.	"Only Believe"	Double A-side with "Life"
19.	"Sylvia"	Elvis Now
20.	"Patch It Up"	"You Don't Have To Say You Love Me" B-side
Total length:			66:56

Disc 21 (1970–1971)
No.	Title	Original Release	Length
1.	"I've Lost You"	That's the Way It Is
2.	"I Just Can't Help Believin'"	That's the Way It Is
3.	"Something"	Walk a Mile in My Shoes: The Essential '70s Masters
4.	"Patch It Up"	That's the Way It Is
5.	"You've Lost That Lovin' Feeling"	That's the Way It Is
6.	"Snowbird"	Elvis Country (I'm 10,000 Years Old)
7.	"Where Did They Go, Lord"	"Rags To Riches" B-side
8.	"Whole Lotta Shakin' Goin' On"	Elvis Country (I'm 10,000 Years Old)
9.	"Rags To Riches"	Single A-side
10.	"The First Time Ever I Saw Your Face"	"An American Trilogy" B-side
11.	"Amazing Grace"	He Touched Me
12.	"Early Mornin' Rain"	Elvis Now
13.	"(That's What You Get) For Lovin' Me"	Elvis (1973)
14.	"Miracle Of The Rosary"	Elvis Now
15.	"It Won't Seem Like Christmas"	Elvis Sings The Wonderful World of Christmas
16.	"If I Get Home On Christmas Day"	Elvis Sings The Wonderful World of Christmas
17.	"Padre"	Elvis (1973)
18.	"Holly Leaves And Christmas Trees"	Elvis Sings The Wonderful World of Christmas
19.	"Merry Christmas Baby"	Elvis Sings The Wonderful World of Christmas
20.	"Silver Bells"	Elvis Sings The Wonderful World of Christmas
21.	"I'll Be Home On Christmas Day"	Elvis Sings The Wonderful World of Christmas
22.	"On A Snowy Christmas Night"	Elvis Sings The Wonderful World of Christmas
23.	"Winter Wonderland"	Elvis Sings The Wonderful World of Christmas
24.	"O Come, All Ye Faithful"	Elvis Sings The Wonderful World of Christmas
25.	"The First Noel"	Elvis Sings The Wonderful World of Christmas
26.	"The Wonderful World Of Christmas"	Elvis Sings The Wonderful World of Christmas
Total length:			79:14

Disc 22 (1971–1972)
No.	Title	Original Release	Length
1.	"Don't Think Twice, It's All Right" (edited version)	Elvis (1973)
2.	"Help Me Make It Through the Night"	Elvis Now
3.	"Until It's Time For You To Go"	Elvis Now
4.	"Lead Me, Guide Me"	He Touched Me
5.	"Fools Rush In (Where Angels Fear to Tread)"	Elvis Now
6.	"He Touched Me"	Single A-side
7.	"I Got Confidence"	He Touched Me
8.	"An Evening Prayer"	He Touched Me
9.	"Seeing Is Believing"	He Touched Me
10.	"A Thing Called Love"	He Touched Me
11.	"It's Still Here"	Elvis (1973)
12.	"I'll Take You Home Again Kathleen"	Elvis (1973)
13.	"I Will Be True"	Elvis (1973)
14.	"I'm Leavin'"	Single A-side
15.	"We Can Make The Morning"	Elvis Now
16.	"It's Only Love"	Single A-side
17.	"Love Me, Love The Life I Lead"	Elvis (1973)
18.	"Put Your Hand In The Hand"	Elvis Now
19.	"Reach Out To Jesus"	He Touched Me
20.	"He Is My Everything"	He Touched Me
21.	"There Is No God But God"	He Touched Me
22.	"I, John"	He Touched Me
23.	"Bosom Of Abraham"	"He Touched Me" B-side
24.	"My Way"	Walk a Mile in My Shoes: The Essential '70s Masters
25.	"I'll Be Home on Christmas Day (remake)"
26.	"It's Impossible"	Elvis (1973)
27.	"An American Trilogy"	Single A-side
Total length:			79:13

Disc 23 (1972)
No.	Title	Original Release	Length
1.	"Separate Ways"	Single A-side
2.	"For the Good Times"	Walk a Mile in My Shoes: The Essential '70s Masters
3.	"Where Do I Go From Here"	Elvis (1973)
4.	"Burning Love"	Single A-side
5.	"Fool"	"Steamroller Blues" B-side
6.	"Always on My Mind"	"Separate Ways" B-side
7.	"It's a Matter of Time"	"Burning Love" B-side
8.	"Also Sprach Zarathustra"	Elvis: As Recorded at Madison Square Garden
9.	"That's All Right"	Elvis: As Recorded at Madison Square Garden
10.	"Proud Mary"	Elvis: As Recorded at Madison Square Garden
11.	"Never Been To Spain"	Elvis: As Recorded at Madison Square Garden
12.	"You Don't Have To Say You Love Me"	Elvis: As Recorded at Madison Square Garden
13.	"You've Lost That Lovin' Feeling"	Elvis: As Recorded at Madison Square Garden
14.	"Polk Salad Annie"	Elvis: As Recorded at Madison Square Garden
15.	"Love Me"	Elvis: As Recorded at Madison Square Garden
16.	"All Shook Up"	Elvis: As Recorded at Madison Square Garden
17.	"Heartbreak Hotel"	Elvis: As Recorded at Madison Square Garden
18.	"(Let Me Be Your) Teddy Bear/Don't Be Cruel"	Elvis: As Recorded at Madison Square Garden
19.	"Love Me Tender"	Elvis: As Recorded at Madison Square Garden
20.	"The Impossible Dream (The Quest)"	Elvis: As Recorded at Madison Square Garden
21.	"Introductions"	Elvis: As Recorded at Madison Square Garden
22.	"Hound Dog"	Elvis: As Recorded at Madison Square Garden
23.	"Suspicious Minds"	Elvis: As Recorded at Madison Square Garden
24.	"For The Good Times"	Elvis: As Recorded at Madison Square Garden
25.	"An American Trilogy"	Elvis: As Recorded at Madison Square Garden
26.	"Funny How Time Slips Away"	Elvis: As Recorded at Madison Square Garden
27.	"I Can't Stop Loving You"	Elvis: As Recorded at Madison Square Garden
28.	"Can't Help Falling In Love"	Elvis: As Recorded at Madison Square Garden
29.	"Closing Vamp"	Elvis: As Recorded at Madison Square Garden
Total length:			73:46

Disc 24 (1973)
No.	Title	Original Release	Length
1.	"Also Sprach Zarathustra"	Aloha From Hawaii: Via Satellite
2.	"See See Rider"	Aloha From Hawaii: Via Satellite
3.	"Burning Love"	Aloha From Hawaii: Via Satellite
4.	"Something"	Aloha From Hawaii: Via Satellite
5.	"You Gave Me A Mountain"	Aloha From Hawaii: Via Satellite
6.	"Steamroller Blues"	Aloha From Hawaii: Via Satellite
7.	"My Way"	Aloha From Hawaii: Via Satellite
8.	"Love Me"	Aloha From Hawaii: Via Satellite
9.	"Johnny B. Goode"	Aloha From Hawaii: Via Satellite
10.	"It's Over"	Aloha From Hawaii: Via Satellite
11.	"Blue Suede Shoes"	Aloha From Hawaii: Via Satellite
12.	"I'm So Lonesome I Could Cry"	Aloha From Hawaii: Via Satellite
13.	"I Can't Stop Loving You"	Aloha From Hawaii: Via Satellite
14.	"Hound Dog"	Aloha From Hawaii: Via Satellite
15.	"What Now My Love"	Aloha From Hawaii: Via Satellite
16.	"Fever"	Aloha From Hawaii: Via Satellite
17.	"Welcome To My World"	Aloha From Hawaii: Via Satellite
18.	"Suspicious Minds"	Aloha From Hawaii: Via Satellite
19.	"Introductions By Elvis"	Aloha From Hawaii: Via Satellite
20.	"I'll Remember You"	Aloha From Hawaii: Via Satellite
21.	"Long Tall Sally / Whole Lotta Shakin' Goin' On"	Aloha From Hawaii: Via Satellite
22.	"An American Trilogy"	Aloha From Hawaii: Via Satellite
23.	"A Big Hunk o' Love"	Aloha From Hawaii: Via Satellite
24.	"Can't Help Falling In Love"	Aloha From Hawaii: Via Satellite
25.	"Blue Hawaii"	Mahalo from Elvis
26.	"Ku-U-I-Po"	Mahalo from Elvis
27.	"No More"	Mahalo from Elvis
28.	"Hawaiian Wedding Song"	Mahalo from Elvis
29.	"Early Mornin' Rain"	Mahalo from Elvis
Total length:			73:34

Disc 25 (1973)
No.	Title	Original Release	Length
1.	"If You Don't Come Back"	Raised on Rock / For Ol' Times Sake
2.	"Three Corn Patches"	Raised on Rock / For Ol' Times Sake
3.	"Take Good Care of Her"	"I've Got A Thing About You Baby" B-side
4.	"Find Out What's Happening"	Raised on Rock / For Ol' Times Sake
5.	"I've Got A Thing About You Baby"	Single A-side
6.	"Just A Little Bit"	Raised on Rock / For Ol' Times Sake
7.	"Raised on Rock"	Single A-side
8.	"For Ol' Times Sake"	"Raised On Rock" B-side
9.	"Girl Of Mine"	Raised on Rock / For Ol' Times Sake
10.	"Sweet Angeline"	Raised on Rock / For Ol' Times Sake
11.	"I Miss You"	Raised on Rock / For Ol' Times Sake
12.	"Are You Sincere"	Raised on Rock / For Ol' Times Sake
13.	"I Got a Feelin' in My Body"	Good Times
14.	"It's Midnight"	"Promised Land" B-side
15.	"You Asked Me To"	Promised Land
16.	"If You Talk In Your Sleep"	Single A-side
17.	"Mr. Songman"	Promised Land
18.	"Thinking About You"	Promised Land
19.	"Love Song Of The Year"	Promised Land
20.	"Help Me"	"If You Talk In Your Sleep" B-side
21.	"My Boy"	Good Times
22.	"Loving Arms"	Good Times
23.	"Good Time Charlie's Got The Blues"	Good Times
24.	"Talk About The Good Times"	Good Times
25.	"Promised Land"	Single A-side
26.	"Your Love's Been A Long Time Coming"	Promised Land
27.	"There's a Honky Tonk Angel (Who'll Take Me Back In)"	Promised Land
Total length:			76:54

Disc 26 (1973–1975)
No.	Title	Original Release	Length
1.	"If That Isn't Love"	Good Times
2.	"Spanish Eyes"	Good Times
3.	"She Wears My Ring"	Good Times
4.	"See See Rider"	Elvis: As Recorded Live On Stage In Memphis
5.	"I Got A Woman / Amen"	Elvis: As Recorded Live On Stage In Memphis
6.	"Love Me"	Elvis: As Recorded Live On Stage In Memphis
7.	"Trying To Get To You"	Elvis: As Recorded Live On Stage In Memphis
8.	"Long Tall Sally / Whole Lotta Shakin' Goin' On / Your Mama Don't Dance / Flip, Flop and Fly / Jailhouse Rock / Hound Dog"	Elvis: As Recorded Live On Stage In Memphis
9.	"Why Me Lord"	Elvis: As Recorded Live On Stage In Memphis
10.	"How Great Thou Art"	Elvis: As Recorded Live On Stage In Memphis
11.	"Blueberry Hill/I Can't Stop Loving You"	Elvis: As Recorded Live On Stage In Memphis
12.	"Help Me"	Elvis: As Recorded Live On Stage In Memphis
13.	"An American Trilogy"	Elvis: As Recorded Live On Stage In Memphis
14.	"Let Me Be There"	Elvis: As Recorded Live On Stage In Memphis
15.	"My Baby Left Me"	Elvis: As Recorded Live On Stage In Memphis
16.	"Lawdy, Miss Clawdy"	Elvis: As Recorded Live On Stage In Memphis
17.	"Can't Help Falling In Love"	Elvis: As Recorded Live On Stage In Memphis
18.	"Closing Vamp"	Elvis: As Recorded Live On Stage In Memphis
19.	"Fairytale"	Today
20.	"Green, Green Grass of Home"	Today
21.	"I Can Help"	Today
22.	"And I Love You So"	Today
23.	"Susan When She Tried"	Today
24.	"T-R-O-U-B-L-E"	Single A-side
25.	"Tiger Man"	Walk a Mile in My Shoes: The Essential '70s Masters
Total length:			74:01

Disc 27 (1975–1977)
No.	Title	Original Release	Length
1.	"Woman Without Love"	Today
2.	"Shake A Hand"	Today
3.	"Bringin' It Back"	Today
4.	"Pieces Of My Life"	Today
5.	"Bitter They Are, Harder They Fall"	From Elvis Presley Boulevard, Memphis, Tennessee
6.	"She Thinks I Still Care"	"Moody Blue" B-side
7.	"The Last Farewell"	From Elvis Presley Boulevard, Memphis, Tennessee
8.	"Solitaire"	From Elvis Presley Boulevard, Memphis, Tennessee
9.	"Moody Blue"	Single A-side
10.	"I'll Never Fall In Love Again"	From Elvis Presley Boulevard, Memphis, Tennessee
11.	"For The Heart"	"Hurt" B-side
12.	"Hurt"	Single A-side
13.	"Danny Boy"	From Elvis Presley Boulevard, Memphis, Tennessee
14.	"Never Again"	From Elvis Presley Boulevard, Memphis, Tennessee
15.	"Love Coming Down"	From Elvis Presley Boulevard, Memphis, Tennessee
16.	"Blue Eyes Crying In The Rain"	From Elvis Presley Boulevard, Memphis, Tennessee
17.	"It's Easy For You"	Moody Blue
18.	"Way Down"	Single A-side
19.	"Pledging My Love"	"Way Down" B-side
20.	"He'll Have to Go"	Moody Blue
21.	"If You Love Me (Let Me Know)"	Moody Blue
22.	"Little Darlin'"	Moody Blue
23.	"Unchained Melody"	Moody Blue
Total length:			77:26

Disc 28 (Outtakes and Alternates I)
No.	Title	Original release	Length
1.	"Blue Moon of Kentucky" (Alternate Take, 1954)	A Golden Celebration (1984)
2.	"Shake, Rattle and Roll" (Alternate Take 8, 1956)	The King of Rock 'n' Roll: The Complete '50s Masters (1992)
3.	"I Beg of You" (Alternate Master, 1957)	Stereo '57: Essential Elvis, Vol. 2 (1989)
4.	"One Night (Of Sin)" (1957)	Elvis: A Legendary Performer, Vol. 4 (1983)
5.	"Loving You" (Fast Version, 1957)	Essential Elvis (1988)
6.	"Treat Me Nice" (Movie Version, 1957)	The Great Performances (1990)
7.	"King Creole" (1st Version, Take 3, 1958)	Hits Like Never Before: Essential Elvis, Vol. 3 (1991)
8.	"As Long as I Have You" (Alternate Master, 1958)	Hits Like Never Before: Essential Elvis, Vol. 3 (1991)
9.	"Lover Doll" (LP Version, 1958)	King Creole (1958)
10.	"Doncha' Think It's Time" (LP Version, 1958)	50,000,000 Elvis Fans Can't Be Wrong: Elvis' Gold Records, Vol. 2 (1959)
11.	"Your Cheatin' Heart" (Alternate Take 9, 1958)	Hits Like Never Before: Essential Elvis, Vol. 3 (1991)
12.	"Ain't That Loving You, Baby" (Alternate Take 11, 1958)	Hits Like Never Before: Essential Elvis, Vol. 3 (1991)
13.	"Big Boots" (Alternate Master, Fast Version, 1960)	G.I. Blues: Collector's Edition (1997)
14.	"Black Star" (Alternate Title Song, 1960)	Collectors Gold (1991)
15.	"Lonely Man" (Solo Version, 1960)	Collectors Gold (1991)
16.	"Can't Help Falling in Love" (Movie Version, 1961)	Blue Hawaii: Collector's Edition (1997)
17.	"I'm Yours" (Single Version, 1961)	Single A-side (1965)
18.	"King of the Whole Wide World" (1st Version, Take 31, 1961)	Kid Galahad (2004)
19.	"One Broken Heart for Sale" (Movie Version, 1962)	Collectors Gold (1991)
20.	"Memphis, Tennessee" (1st Version, 1963)	Collectors Gold (1991)
21.	"Ask Me" (1st Version, 1963)	Collectors Gold (1991)
22.	"Today, Tomorrow and Forever" (Duet with Ann-Margret, 1963)	Today, Tomorrow & Forever (2002)
23.	"I'm a Roustabout" (Alternate Title Song, 1964)	Elvis: 2nd to None (2003)
24.	"Tomorrow Night" (Overdubbed Version, 1965)	Elvis for Everyone (1965)
25.	"It Hurts Me" (1968)	Elvis: A Legendary Performer, Vol. 3 (1978)
26.	"Let Yourself Go" (1968)	Elvis: A Legendary Performer, Vol. 3 (1978)
27.	"A Hundred Years From Now" (Studio Jam, 1970)	Walk a Mile in My Shoes: The Essential '70s Masters (1995)
28.	"Amazing Grace" (Alternate Take 2, 1971)	Walk a Mile in My Shoes: The Essential '70s Masters (1995)
29.	"Lady Madonna" (Studio Jam, 1971)	Walk a Mile in My Shoes: The Essential '70s Masters (1995)
30.	"I Shall Be Released" (1971)	Walk a Mile in My Shoes: The Essential '70s Masters (1995)
31.	"She Thinks I Still Care" (Alternate Take 2B, 1976)	Walk a Mile in My Shoes: The Essential '70s Masters (1995)
Total length:			69:57

Disc 29 (Outtakes and Alternates II)
No.	Title	Original release	Length
1.	"Tweedle Dee" (Live at Gladewater High School, 1955)	Elvis: The First Live Recordings (1984)
2.	"Maybellene" (Live at the Municipal Auditorium, 1955)	Elvis: The First Live Recordings (1984)
3.	"Heartbreak Hotel" (Live at the New Frontier Hotel, 1956)	Elvis Aron Presley (1980)
4.	"Long Tall Sally" (Live at the New Frontier Hotel, 1956)	Elvis Aron Presley (1980)
5.	"Blue Suede Shoes" (Live at the New Frontier Hotel, 1956)	Elvis Aron Presley (1980)
6.	"Money Honey" (Live at the New Frontier Hotel, 1956)	Elvis Aron Presley (1980)
7.	"That's All Right" (Live at NBC Studios, 1968)	Elvis: A Legendary Performer, Vol. 4 (1983)
8.	"Are You Lonesome Tonight?" (Live at NBC Studios, 1968)	Elvis: A Legendary Performer, Vol. 1 (1974)
9.	"Blue Suede Shoes" (Live at NBC Studios, 1968)	Elvis: A Legendary Performer, Vol. 2 (1976)
10.	"Baby What You Want Me to Do" (Live at NBC Studios, 1968)	Elvis: A Legendary Performer, Vol. 2 (1976)
11.	"Love Me" (Live at NBC Studios, 1968)	Elvis: A Legendary Performer, Vol. 1 (1974)
12.	"Trying to Get to You" (Live at NBC Studios, 1968)	Elvis: A Legendary Performer, Vol. 1 (1974)
13.	"Are You Lonesome Tonight?" (Laughing Version) (Live at the International Hotel, 1969)	Elvis Aron Presley (1980)
14.	"Little Sister" / "Get Back" (Live at the International Hotel, 1970)	Elvis Aron Presley (1980)
15.	"Bridge over Troubled Water" (Live at the International Hotel, 1970)	Platinum: A Life in Music (1997)
16.	"Never Been to Spain" (Live at the Las Vegas Hilton, 1972)	Walk a Mile in My Shoes: The Essential '70s Masters (1995)
17.	"You Gave Me a Mountain" (Live at the Las Vegas Hilton, 1972)	Walk a Mile in My Shoes: The Essential '70s Masters (1995)
18.	"A Big Hunk o' Love" (Live at the Las Vegas Hilton, 1972)	Walk a Mile in My Shoes: The Essential '70s Masters (1995)
19.	"The Impossible Dream" (Live at the Las Vegas Hilton, 1972)	Walk a Mile in My Shoes: The Essential '70s Masters (1995)
20.	"It's Over" (Live at the Las Vegas Hilton, 1972)	Walk a Mile in My Shoes: The Essential '70s Masters (1995)
21.	"Reconsider Baby" (Live at Madison Square Garden, 1972)	Elvis: A Legendary Performer, Vol. 4 (1983)
22.	"You're the Reason I'm Living" (Live at the Las Vegas Hilton, 1975)	Live in Las Vegas (2001)
23.	"Softly as I Leave You" (Live at the Las Vegas Hilton, 1975)	"Unchained Melody" B-side (1978)
24.	"America" (Live at the Las Vegas Hilton, 1975)	"My Way" B-side (1977)
25.	"Unchained Melody" (Live at Rushmore Civic Center, 1977)	Single A-side (1978)
Total length:			73:02

Disc 30 (Outtakes and Alternates III)
No.	Title	Original Release	Length
1.	"My Happiness" (Demo, 1953)	The Great Performances (1990)
2.	"That's When Your Heartaches Begin" (Demo, 1953)	The King of Rock 'n' Roll: The Complete '50s Masters (1992)
3.	"I'll Never Stand in Your Way" (Demo, 1954)	Platinum: A Life in Music (1997)
4.	"It Wouldn't Be the Same Without You" (Demo, 1954)	Sunrise (1999)
5.	"Fool, Fool, Fool" (KDAV Radio Recording, 1955)	The King of Rock 'n' Roll: The Complete '50s Masters (1992)
6.	"I Asked the Lord" (Germany Home Recording, 1958)	The Home Recordings (1999)
7.	"Earth Angel" (Germany Home Recording, 1958)	A Golden Celebration (1984)
8.	"I'm Beginning to Forget You" (Germany Home Recording, 1958)	Elvis: A Legendary Performer, Vol. 4 (1984)
9.	"Mona Lisa" (Germany Home Recording, 1958)	Elvis: A Legendary Performer, Vol. 4 (1984)
10.	"(Marie's the Name) His Latest Flame" (Studio Rehearsal, 1961)	Studio B: Nashville Outtakes, 1961–1964 (2003)
11.	"Viva Las Vegas" (Studio Rehearsal, 1963)	Silver Screen Stereo (2001)
12.	"If I Loved You" (Rocca Place Home Recording, 1966)	The Home Recordings (1999)
13.	"Tennessee Waltz" (Rocca Place Home Recording, 1966)	The Home Recordings (1999)
14.	"What Now My Love" (Rocca Place Home Recording, 1966)	The Home Recordings (1999)
15.	"Show Me Thy Ways, O Lord" (Rocca Place Home Recording, 1966)	The Home Recordings (1999)
16.	"Oh How I Love Jesus" (Rocca Place Home Recording, 1966)	Platinum: A Life in Music (1997)
17.	"Hide Thou Me" (Rocca Place Home Recording, 1966)	Today, Tomorrow & Forever (2002)
18.	"Write to Me from Naples" (Rocca Place Home Recording, 1966)	A Golden Celebration (1984)
19.	"My Heart Cries for You" (Rocca Place Home Recording, 1966)	A Golden Celebration (1984)
20.	"Dark Moon" (Rocca Place Home Recording, 1966)	A Golden Celebration (1984)
21.	"A Little Less Conversation" (1968)	Memories: The '68 Comeback Special (1998)
22.	"It's My Way / This Time / I Can't Stop Loving You" (Studio Jam, 1969)	From Nashville to Memphis: The Essential '60s Masters (1993)
23.	"Faded Love" (Studio Rehearsal, 1970)	A Hundred Years from Now: Essential Elvis, Vol. 4 (1996)
24.	"Ghost Riders in the Sky" (Rehearsal Jam, 1970)	The Way It Was (2001)
25.	"Allá en el Rancho Grande" (Rehearsal Jam, 1970)	Walk a Mile in My Shoes: The Essential '70s Masters(1995)
26.	"Froggy Went a-Courtin'" (Rehearsal Jam, 1970)	Walk a Mile in My Shoes: The Essential '70s Masters(1995)
27.	"I'm So Lonesome I Could Cry" (Sam Thompson Home Recording, 1973)	Elvis by the Presleys (2005)
28.	"The Twelfth of Never" (Rehearsal, 1974)	Walk a Mile in My Shoes: The Essential '70s Masters (1995)
Total length:			66:33
