= Sunrise (Elvis Presley album) =

Compilation album by Elvis Presley
- Released: February 9, 1999
- Recorded: July 1953 – November 1955
- Genres: Rock and roll; country; R&B
- Length: 92:54
- Label: RCA Records
- Producer: Sam Phillips

Elvis Presley chronology
Memories: The '68 Comeback Special (1998)	Sunrise (1999)	Home Recordings (1999)

Professional ratings
Review scores
Source	Rating
Allmusic	5/5 stars

Sunrise is a two-disc compilation of Elvis Presley's studio recordings at Sun Studio from 1953 to 1955, released in 1999 by RCA Records, catalog number 67675-2. This set features all of the surviving Sun master recordings made by Presley and his accompanists, Scotty Moore and Bill Black, occasionally augmented by other musicians, prior to his debut on RCA Victor in January, 1956.

== Contents ==
Tapes for at least three songs have been lost: Sun versions of "I Got A Woman", "Uncle Pen", and "Satisfied". The first would be recorded by Presley during his first RCA Victor session. All of the studio commercial recordings were produced by Sam Phillips, the owner of Sun Studio in Memphis, Tennessee. Phillips released Presley's recording contract to RCA Victor in November of 1955 for the exorbitant sum of $35,000 (equivalent to $420,652 in 2025). This gave RCA Victor the rights to all of Presley's masters recorded at Sun.

The first disc presents all eighteen Sun titles from professional recording sessions during the singer's stay at the label. The opening ten tracks comprise the A and b sides of the five officially released Presley singles on the Sun label. Outtakes from sessions at Sun were used to fill in catalogue items for RCA Victor, with five used for Presley's debut LP.

The second disc compiles seven alternate takes from the professional studio sessions, with a different alternate of "Blue Moon" from the Take 1 that appears on 1950s box set. The remaining selections derive from acetates or basic recording equipment, and are not of professional sound quality; these are marked with an asterisk in the track listings below. The first four tracks comprise the pre-professional test recordings made by Elvis alone in July 1953 and January 1954. "Fool Fool Fool" and "Shake, Rattle, and Roll" were recorded by the standard Presley trio at an unknown location in Lubbock, Texas, during January 1955; presumably the visit where Buddy Holly witnessed the trio and decided to begin performing rock and roll. "It Wouldn't Be The Same Without You," and the final six tracks from a live performance on the Louisiana Hayride, in Shreveport, Louisiana, featuring an augmented band in 1955, are released here for the first time.

The set does not include the three additional alternate takes of "I Love You Because" and the five additional alternates of "I'm Left, You're Right, She's Gone" that appeared on the 1987 two-disc set The Complete Sun Sessions.

== Impact ==
The set includes "That's All Right (Mama)", one of candidates for being "the first rock and roll record". Presley's entire period at Sun is one of the seminal events in the birth of rock and roll, specifically also the beginning of the subgenre known as rockabilly. As stated by author Peter Guralnick, opening the liner notes to this set:

"If Elvis Presley had never made another record after his last Sun session in the fall of 1955, there seems little question that his music would have achieved much the same mythic status as Robert Johnson's blues. The body of his work at Sun is so transcendent, so fresh, and so original that even today you can scarcely listen to it in relation to anything but itself. Like all great art its sources may be obvious, but its overall impact defies explanation."

In 2002, given their importance in the development of American popular music, The Sun Sessions were chosen, by the National Recording Registry of the Library of Congress, to be kept as a bequeathal to posterity. In 2012 Rolling Stone magazine placed Sunrise at number 11 on its list of the "500 Greatest Albums of All Time".

In the Rolling Stone listing, the album pictured is not Sunrise but the 1976 compilation The Sun Sessions. The album title is also incorrectly given as The Sun Sessions. The text, however, cites a 2-disc, 1999 RCA release that can only be Sunrise. When Rolling Stone updated its list in 2020, Sunrise was replaced by The Sun Sessions, which was ranked 78th.

For more detailed information on the recording sessions, see Elvis Presley's Sun recordings.

== Track listing ==
Chart positions for LPs and EPs from Billboard Top Pop Albums chart; positions for singles from Billboard Pop Singles chart except where noted.

=== Disc one ===
Track	Song title	Writer(s)	Time	Recorded	Original LP Issue	Catalogue	Release date	Chart peak
1.	That's All Right	Arthur Crudup	1:55	July 5, 1954		Sun 209	July 1954	
2.	Blue Moon of Kentucky	Bill Monroe	2:02	July 1954		Sun 209b	July 1954	
3.	Good Rockin' Tonight	Roy Brown	2:12	September 10, 1954		Sun 210	September 1954	
4.	I Don't Care If the Sun Don't Shine	Mack David	2:27	September 10, 1954		Sun 210b	September 1954	
5.	Milkcow Blues Boogie	Kokomo Arnold	2:38	November–December 1954		Sun 215	December 29, 1954	
6.	You're a Heartbreaker	Jack Sallee	2:12	November 1954		Sun 215b	December 1953	#74
7.	Baby Let's Play House	Arthur Gunter	2:15	February 1955		Sun 217	April 1955	C&W #5
8.	I'm Left, You're Right, She's Gone	Stan Kesler, William Taylor	2:36	March 1955		Sun 217b	April 1955	
9.	I Forgot to Remember to Forget	Stan Kesler and Charlie Feathers	2:28	July 1955		Sun 223	August 1955	C&W #1
10.	Mystery Train	Junior Parker, Sam Phillips	2:24	July 1955		Sun 223b	August 1955	
11.	I Love You Because	Leon Payne	2:42	July 1955	Elvis Presley	LPM 1254	March 1956	#1
12.	Harbor Lights	Jimmy Kennedy and Hugh Williams	2:35	July 1954	Elvis: A Legendary Performer Vol. 2	CPL1 1349	1/8/76	#46
13.	Blue Moon	Richard Rodgers and Lorenz Hart	2:31	August 1954	Elvis Presley	LPM 1254	March 1956	#1
14.	Tomorrow Night	Sam Coslow and Will Grocz	2:58	September 1954	Elvis for Everyone	LSP 3450		#10
15.	I'll Never Let You Go (Little Darlin')	Jimmy Wakely	2:24	September 1954	Elvis Presley	LPM 1254	March 1956	#1
16.	Just Because	Sydney Robin, Bob Shelton, Joe Shelton	2:32	September 1954	Elvis Presley	LPM 1254	March 1956	#1
17.	I'm Left, You're Right, She's Gone (slow version)	Stan Kesler, William Taylor	2:36	March 1955	The Complete Sun Sessions	RCA 6414-2	1987	
18.	Trying to Get to You	Rose Marie McCoy and Charles Singleton	2:31	July 1955	Elvis Presley	LPM 1254	March 1956	#1
19.	When It Rains It Really Pours	Bill Emerson	4:03	November 1955	Elvis: A Legendary Performer Vol. 4	RCA 6414-2	1984	

=== Disc two ===
Track	Song title	Writer(s)	Time	Recorded	Original LP Issue	Catalogue	Release date	Chart peak
1.	My Happiness*	Betty Peterson Blasco and Borney Bergantine	2:32	July 1953	Elvis: The Great Performances	2227-2	1990	
2.	That's When Your Heartaches Begin*	Fred Fisher, Billy Hill and William Raskin	2:46	July 1953	The Complete 50s Masters	66050-2	6/23/92	#159
3.	I'll Never Stand In Your Way*	Hy Heath	2:01	January 1954	Platinum: A Life in Music	67469-2		#80
4.	It Wouldn't Be The Same Without You*	Fred Rose	2:01	1/4/54	previously unreleased			
5.	I Love You Because (alternate)	Leon Payne	3:51	7/5/54	Elvis: A Legendary Performer Vol. 1	CPL1 0341	2/2/74	#43
6.	That's All Right (alternate)	Arthur Crudup	2:12	January 1954	The Complete Sun Sessions	6414-2	1987	
7.	Blue Moon of Kentucky (alternate)	Bill Monroe	1:05	July 1954	The Complete Sun Sessions	6414-2	1987	
8.	Blue Moon (alternate)	Richard Rodgers and Lorenz Hart	3:05	August 1954	previously unreleased			
9.	I'll Never Let You Go (Little Darlin') (alternate)	Jimmy Wakely	1:04	September 1954	The Complete Sun Sessions	6414-2	1987	
10.	I Don't Care If the Sun Don't Shine (alternate)	Mack David	3:30	September 1954	The Complete Sun Sessions	6414-2	1987	
11.	I'm Left, You're Right, She's Gone (slow version alternate)	Stan Kesler, William Taylor	2:48	March 1955	The Complete Sun Sessions	6414-2	1987	
12.	Fool, Fool, Fool*	Nugetre	1:51	January 1955	The Complete 50s Masters	66050-2		#159
13.	Shake, Rattle & Roll*	Charles E. Calhoun	2:17	January 1955	The Complete 50s Masters	66050-2		#159
14.	I'm Left, You're Right, She's Gone* (live)	Stan Kesler, William Taylor	1:50	July 1955	previously unreleased			
15.	That's All Right* (live)	Arthur Crudup	1:41	January 1955	previously unreleased			
16.	Money Honey* (live)	Jesse Stone	2:40	January 1955	previously unreleased			
17.	Tweedle Dee* (live)	Winfield Scott	2:11	1/22/55	previously unreleased			
18.	I Don't Care If the Sun Don't Shine* (live)	Mack David	2:23	January 1955	previously unreleased			
19.	Hearts of Stone* (live)	Rudy Jackson, Eddie Ray	1:57	January 1955	previously unreleased			

== Personnel ==
- Elvis Presley – vocal, guitar
- Scotty Moore – guitar on disc one, disc two (tracks 5–19)
- Bill Black – bass on disc one, disc two (tracks 5–19)
- Jimmie Lott – drums on disc one (track 8)
- Johnny Bernero – drums on disc one (tracks 9, 18, 19)
- Leon Post – piano on disc two (tracks 14–19)
- Sonny Trammel – steel guitar on disc two (tracks 14–19)
