= A Legendary Performer =

A Legendary Performer is a compilation album series released by RCA Records. It included, among many:

- Elvis: A Legendary Performer, a series of compilations of recordings by Elvis Presley
  - Elvis: A Legendary Performer Volume 1, 1974
  - Elvis: A Legendary Performer Volume 2, 1976
  - Elvis: A Legendary Performer Volume 3, 1979
  - Elvis: A Legendary Performer Volume 4, 1983
- A Legendary Performer (Perry Como album), 1976
