= Elvis: A Legendary Performer =

Elvis: A Legendary Performer is the title of a series of four compilation albums featuring recordings by American singer Elvis Presley. Released by RCA Records between 1974 and 1983, the albums contained varying amounts of previously released and previously unreleased recordings from Presley's career. The RCA Legendary Performer album series featured releases from several other RCA Victor recording artists, but the Presley series was the longest-running. Presley was also the only artist other than Glenn Miller to be represented by multiple albums in the Legendary Performer series.

1. Elvis: A Legendary Performer Volume 1 (1974)
2. Elvis: A Legendary Performer Volume 2 (1976)
3. Elvis: A Legendary Performer Volume 3 (1979)
4. Elvis: A Legendary Performer Volume 4 (1983)
