= Viva Elvis (soundtrack) =

Viva Elvis: The Album

Soundtrack album by Elvis Presley
- Released: November 11, 2010
- Genre: Rock music
- Length: 41:42
- Label: Sony Legacy Recordings
- Producer: Erich van Tourneau

Elvis Presley chronology
The Complete Elvis Presley Masters (2010)	Viva Elvis: The Album (2010)

Viva Elvis is the soundtrack remix album of the Cirque du Soleil show Viva Elvis, which focuses on the life and music of American singer and musician Elvis Presley. The album, though initially produced as a soundtrack to the show, does not include all of the songs featured in the show. The CD tracks are rearranged and extended versions of songs heard in the show, and in fact the album includes two instrumental versions of the songs "Memories" and "You'll Never Walk Alone", neither of which is in the Cirque du Soleil show.

This album marks the third official posthumous album by Elvis Presley created from scratch, whereas previous albums were compilations of previously released or unreleased studio material recorded well before his death. The two prior albums were the urban country-influenced 1981 Guitar Man record and the 2008 Christmas Duets CD. Similar to Cirque du Soleil's soundtrack to The Beatles-themed Love, "Viva Elvis" contains samples from throughout the entire span of Elvis Presley's career, including interview clips, home recordings, studio outtakes and snippets of dialogue from Presley's feature films.

Unlike Love, however, Viva Elvis features new backing instrumentation on each track in an attempt to modernize the arrangements. This has met with a mixed critical response, with some reviewers praising the production quality and others opining that Presley's music is best left untampered with.

== Track listing ==
Professional ratings
Review scores
Source	Rating
Allmusic	2010

No.	Title	Writer(s)	Length
1.	"Also sprach Zarathustra"	Richard Strauss	2:11
2.	"Blue Suede Shoes"	Carl Perkins	3:11
3.	"That's All Right"	Arthur Crudup	4:41
4.	"Heartbreak Hotel"	Mae Boren Axton, Tommy Durden, Elvis Presley	4:54
5.	"Love Me Tender"	Vera Matson, Elvis Presley	4:13
6.	"King Creole"	Jerry Leiber and Mike Stoller	4:26
7.	"Bossa Nova Baby"	Jerry Leiber and Mike Stoller	3:07
8.	"Burning Love"	Dennis Linde	4:15
9.	"Memories"	Mac Davis, Billy Strange	0:54
10.	"Can't Help Falling In Love"	Hugo Peretti, Luigi Creatore, George Weiss	4:39
11.	"You'll Never Walk Alone" (piano interlude)	Richard Rodgers, Oscar Hammerstein II	1:27
12.	"Suspicious Minds"	Mark James	4:28

== Bonus tracks ==
In each country, a bonus version of "Love Me Tender" was included, featuring a local singer in place of the singer from the Cirque du Soleil show.

- Finland - Anna Puu
- Netherlands - Lisa Lois
- France - Amel Bent
- Spain - Russian Red
- America and Wal-Mart Exclusive in United States - Thalía
- Australia - Jessica Mauboy
- Belgium - Dani Klein
- Canada - Marie-Mai
- Portugal - Aurea
- Japan - Miho Fukuhara

== Personnel ==
- Vocals - Elvis Presley
- Guest singers - Dea Norberg ("Love Me Tender"), Jennlee Shallow ("King Creole"), Sherry St-Germain ("Can't Help Falling In Love"), Stacie Tabb ("Suspicious Minds")
- Drums - Ben Clement
- Bass - Patrick Levergne
- Electric guitars - JS "The Flash" Chouinard, Mike Plant, Steve Nadeau, Martin Bachand, Paul Deslauriers, Erich van Tourneau
- Acoustic guitars - Olivier Goulet, Erich van Tourneau
- Piano and keyboards: Erich van Tourneau
- Harmonica - Guy Belanger
- Scratch - DJ Pocket
- Brass section - Jean-Francois Thibeault (T-Bone), Brune Dumont (Sax), David Perrico (Trumpet), Jean-Francois Gagnon (Flugel)

== Production ==
- Producer and arranger: Eric van Tourneau
- Assistant producer and assistant arranger: Hugo "Wedge Montecristo" Bombardier
- Executive producers: Steve Berkowitz, Adam Block, Stephanie Mongeau, Jacques Methe, Stephane Bergevin, Gary Hovey and Priscilla Presley

== Charts ==
Chart performance
Chart (2010–2011)	Peak position
Australian Albums (ARIA)	45
Austrian Albums (Ö3 Austria)	54
Belgian Albums (Ultratop Flanders)	21
Belgian Albums (Ultratop Wallonia)	36
Canadian Albums (Billboard)	10
Czech Albums (ČNS IFPI)	34
Danish Albums (Hitlisten)	29
Dutch Albums (Album Top 100)	13
European Albums (Billboard)	23
German Albums (Offizielle Top 100)	54
Irish Albums (IRMA)	15
Italian Albums (FIMI)	16
Japanese Albums (Oricon)	93
New Zealand Albums (RMNZ)	21
Norwegian Albums (VG-lista)	21
Scottish Albums (Official Charts)	12
South Korean Albums (Circle) 1CD	59
South Korean Albums (Circle) 2CD	57
Spanish Albums (Promusicae)	43
Swedish Albums (Sverigetopplistan)	13
Swiss Albums (Schweizer Hitparade)	26
UK Albums (Official Charts)	19
US Billboard 200	48
US Top Rock Albums (Billboard)	9

== Certifications and sales ==
Certifications and sales
Region	Certification	Certified units/sales
Sweden (GLF)	Gold	20,000^{‡}
United Kingdom (BPI)	Silver	60,000^{*}
^{*} Sales figures based on certification alone.^{‡} Sales+streaming figures based on certification alone.

== See also ==
- Cirque du Soleil
- Viva Elvis
- Cirque du Soleil discography
- Elvis (2022 soundtrack)
