= The Sun Sessions =

Compilation album by Elvis Presley
- Released: March 21, 1976
- Recorded: July 1954 – July 1955
- Studio: Sun (Memphis)
- Genres: Rockabilly, rock and roll, country
- Length: 39:47
- Label: RCA Victor
- Producer: Sam Phillips

Elvis Presley chronology
Elvis: A Legendary Performer Volume 2 (1976)	The Sun Sessions (1976)	From Elvis Presley Boulevard, Memphis, Tennessee (1976)

The Sun Sessions is a compilation album by American singer Elvis Presley, issued by RCA Records in 1976. The album contains Presley's earliest commercial recordings, made in Memphis, Tennessee, for Sun Records in 1954 and 1955. RCA issued the album in the UK in 1975 under the title The Sun Collection. The album features liner notes by Roy Carr of the New Musical Express. The Sun Sessions features most of the tracks Elvis recorded for Sun Records and produced by Sam Phillips, the head of Sun Studios. The Sun Sessions reached number two on the Billboard Country Albums and number 1 on the Cashbox Country Albums charts.

In 2002, The Sun Sessions was chosen by the National Recording Registry of the Library of Congress to be included in its archives given their importance to the development of American popular music. In 2003, the album was ranked number 11 on Rolling Stone's list of The 500 Greatest Albums of All Time, although its place in future revisions of the list was supplanted by Sunrise, a similar, larger compilation. The Rock and Roll Hall of Fame's 500 Songs that Shaped Rock and Roll included two tracks from the album: "Mystery Train" and "That's All Right."

== Recording ==
The album features most of the tracks Elvis recorded at Sun studio and were produced by Sam Phillips, the head of Sun Studios. Elvis began his singing career with Sun Records label in Memphis. Phillips signed Presley after hearing a song that he had recorded for his mother on his birthday.

Phillips said that Presley was rehearsing with his band, Scotty Moore and Bill Black, when Presley started singing the song, a blues song written by Arthur "Big Boy" Crudup. Phillips said that the version of the song was what he was looking for when he signed Presley, and turned the tape recorder on.

Elvis recorded more than 20 songs at Sun, including some private recordings. Of these, 16 appear on this album.

Missing songs:

- "Harbor Lights"
- "Tomorrow Night"
- "When It Rains, It Really Pours"
- "I Got a Woman" (tape lost)
- "Satisfied" (tape lost)
- The earlier private recordings

In 1987, RCA Records released The Complete Sun Sessions which included all 16 tracks previously issued on The Sun Sessions plus "Harbor Lights", "Tomorrow Night", "When It Rains, It Really Pours", and 14 other outtakes. Although the album claims to contain the Complete Sun recordings, the collection was still missing "I Got a Woman", "Satisfied" and the earlier private recordings.

== Commercial performance ==
The Sun Sessions was released in March 1976 and reached No. 76 on the pop and No. 2 on the country charts.

The single "Baby, Let's Play House" combined with "I'm Left, You're Right, She's Gone" reached No. 5 on the country charts in 1955. Aware that Elvis was rapidly building a reputation for his live performances, RCA Victor bought out Presley's contract with Sun Records for $35,000.

The single "That's All Right" did not chart in the US when released in 1954, and it was never issued as a single in Great Britain during Presley's lifetime. In 2004, the song became the focus of attention when it was the subject of a great deal of publicity because of the 50-year anniversary. There was a special ceremony on July 6, 2004, featuring Isaac Hayes, Justin Timberlake and Scotty Moore which was beamed live to 1200 radio stations. The song went top five in the UK and Canada and also charted in Australia. The Sun Sessions was also re-released in 2004 (in Japan only) to celebrate the anniversary.

== Reception and legacy ==
Professional ratings
Review scores
Source	Rating
AllMusic	5/5 stars
Encyclopedia of Popular Music	5/5 stars
The Rolling Stone Album Guide	5/5 stars
Sputnikmusic	5/5

After The Sun Sessions was released, Village Voice critic Robert Christgau hailed The Sun Sessions as "the rock reissue of the year", writing in that along with Chuck Berry's Golden Decade, its songs represented the wellspring of rock music. He later included it in his "basic record library" of essential albums from the 1950s and 1960s, published in Christgau's Record Guide: Rock Albums of the Seventies (1981).

In 2003, the album's 1999 extended 2CD reissue was ranked No. 11 on Rolling Stone magazine's list of the 500 greatest albums of all time, maintaining the rating in a 2012 revised list, and dropping to number 78 in the 2020 reboot of the list. In 2001, the TV channel VH1 named it the 21st greatest album of all time. Music scholar Michael Campbell called it "quintessential rockabilly" with Presley's voice "the magical element" drawing on country and rhythm and blues but confined to neither, while AllMusic critic Cub Koda said "what we ultimately have here is a young Elvis Presley, mixing elements of blues, gospel and hillbilly music together and getting ready to unleash its end result – rock & roll – on an unsuspecting world."

The Rock and Roll Hall of Fame's 500 Songs that Shaped Rock and Roll included two tracks from the album: "Mystery Train" and "That's All Right." In 2002, The Sun Sessions were chosen by the National Recording Registry of the Library of Congress to be included in its archives given their importance to the development of American popular music. This album is the very first Elvis album to feature "I Don't Care If The Sun Don't Shine", which was only previously issued as a single. After more than 20 years, The Sun Sessions marked the song's official debut on LP.

== Track listing ==
Side one
No.	Title	Writer(s)	Recording date	Length
1.	"That's All Right (Mama)" (from single, 1954)	Arthur Crudup	July 5, 1954	1:57
2.	"Blue Moon of Kentucky" (from single, 1954)	Bill Monroe	July 7, 1954	2:04
3.	"I Don't Care if the Sun Don't Shine" (from single, 1954)	Mack David	September 10, 1954	2:28
4.	"Good Rockin' Tonight" (from single, 1954)	Roy Brown	September 10, 1954	2:14
5.	"Milk Cow Blues Boogie" (from single, 1955)	Kokomo Arnold	November–December, 1954	2:39
6.	"You're a Heartbreaker" (from single, 1955)	Jack Sallee	November–December, 1954	2:12
7.	"I'm Left, You're Right, She's Gone" (from single, 1955)	Stan Kesler, William Taylor	February–March 1955	2:37
8.	"Baby Let's Play House" (from single, 1955)	Arthur Gunter	February–March 1955	2:17

Side two
No.	Title	Writer(s)	Recording date	Length
1.	"Mystery Train" (from single, 1955)	Junior Parker, Sam Phillips	July 21, 1955	2:26
2.	"I Forgot to Remember to Forget" (from single, 1955)	Stan Kesler, Charlie Feathers	July 21, 1955	2:30
3.	"I'll Never Let You Go (Little Darlin')" (RCA 1956)	Jimmy Wakely	September, 1954	2:26
4.	"I Love You Because" (RCA 1956, 1st version)	Leon Payne	July 5, 1954	2:43
5.	"Tryin' to Get to You" (RCA 1956)	Rose Marie McCoy, Charles Singleton	July 21, 1955	2:33
6.	"Blue Moon" (RCA 1956)	Richard Rodgers, Lorenz Hart	August 19, 1954	2:41
7.	"Just Because" (RCA 1956)	Sydney Robin, Bob Shelton, Joe Shelton	September, 1954	2:34
8.	"I Love You Because" (RCA 1974; 2nd version)	Leon Payne	July 5, 1954	3:25

Note

- The last six tracks are original Sun recordings, but were not issued until 1956 on Presley's first album for RCA Victor. They were never released on the Sun label.

== Personnel ==
- Elvis Presley – vocals, acoustic guitar, piano on "Trying to Get to You"
- Scotty Moore – electric guitar
- Bill Black – double bass
- Jimmie Lott – drums on "I'm Left, You're Right, She's Gone" (erroneously attributed to D.J. Fontana)
- Johnny Bernero – drums on "I Forgot to Remember to Forget" and "Trying to Get to You" (erroneously attributed to D.J. Fontana)

== Charts ==
Chart (1976)	Peak position
US Billboard 200	76
US Country Albums	2

Chart (1977)	Peak position
UK Albums Chart	16
