= Elvis: Greatest Hits Volume 1 =

Compilation album by Elvis Presley
- Released: October 1981
- Recorded: 1966–1973
- Genre: Rock and roll
- Label: RCA Victor
- Producer: Felton Jarvis

Elvis Presley chronology
This Is Elvis (1981)	Elvis: Greatest Hits Volume 1 (1981)	Memories Of Christmas (1982)

Professional ratings
Review scores
Source	Rating
AllMusic	3/5 stars

Released in October 1981, Elvis: Greatest Hits Vol. 1 was an attempt by RCA Records at launching a new series of reissues featuring American rock and roll singer, Elvis Presley. Ultimately, however, only this single volume was released in this particular series.

Despite its title, the album is thematically similar to the Elvis: A Legendary Performer series of albums RCA issued between 1974 and 1983, in that it consisted of a mixture of previously released recordings and previously unissued performances. In this case, the unreleased material consisted of live performances from Las Vegas and Honolulu.

The collection received mixed reviews, with Roy Carr and Mick Farren, in Elvis: The Illustrated Record, a book released the following year, calling the album title misleading: "Predictable Las Vegas standards hardly fall under the category of 'Greatest Hits,'" they write. "One seriously wonders exactly who records like this are aimed at," they continue, wondering if RCA did indeed have anymore notable material from Elvis that had yet to be released (as subsequent releases proved, the label did possess many more previously unreleased recordings).

Besides the aforementioned unreleased live recordings, this album also includes the true stereo debut of the songs "Suspicious Minds" (previously issued only in mono), and "The Sound Of Your Cry" (which was released for the first time on an Elvis album).

== Track listing ==
All previously released unless noted:

Side one
No.	Title	Writer(s)	Length
1.	"The Wonder of You" (previously released: recorded live in Las Vegas, February 18, 1970)	Baker Knight	2:36
2.	"A Big Hunk o' Love" (previously unreleased; recorded in Las Vegas, February 15, 1972)	Aaron Schroeder, Sid Wyche	2:03
3.	"There Goes My Everything"	Dallas Frazier	2:56
4.	"Suspicious Minds"	Mark James	4:20
5.	"What'd I Say" (previously unissued: recorded live in Las Vegas, August, 1969)	Ray Charles	4:19

Side two
No.	Title	Writer(s)	Length
1.	"Don't Cry Daddy" (previously unissued: recorded live in Las Vegas, February, 1970)	Mac Davis	2:35
2.	"Steamroller Blues" (previously released: recorded live in Hawaii, January 12, 1973)	James Taylor	3:14
3.	"The Sound of Your Cry"	Bernie Baum, Bill Giant, Buddy Kaye	4:00
4.	"Burning Love"	Dennis Linde	2:54
5.	"You'll Never Walk Alone"	Oscar Hammerstein II, Richard Rodgers	2:43

== Chart performance ==
Chart (1981)	Peak position
U.S. Billboard Top Country Albums	47
U.S. Billboard 200	142
