= The Trouble with Girls (film) =

1969 film by Peter Tewksbury

- Theatrical release poster
- Directed by: Peter Tewksbury
- Screenplay by: Arnold Peyser; Lois Peyser
- Based on: Chautauqua; 1960 novel by Day Keene; Dwight V. Babcock
- Produced by: Lester Welch
- Starring: Elvis Presley; Marlyn Mason; Sheree North; Edward Andrews; Vincent Price; Joyce Van Patten
- Cinematography: Jacques R. Marquette
- Edited by: Al Clark
- Music by: Billy Strange
- Production company: Metro-Goldwyn-Mayer
- Distributed by: Metro-Goldwyn-Mayer
- Release dates: June 1969 (Dayton, Ohio); September 10, 1969 (Los Angeles)
- Running time: 99 minutes
- Country: United States
- Language: English

The Trouble with Girls (and How to Get into It), also known as The Trouble with Girls, is a 1969 American film directed by Peter Tewksbury and starring Elvis Presley. It was one of Presley's final acting roles, along with the same year's Change of Habit. It was written by Arnold Peyser and Lois Peyser based on the 1960 novel Chautauqua by Day Keene and Dwight Vincent Babcock.

== Plot ==
In a small Iowa town in 1927, a traveling Chautauqua company arrives, with internal squabbles dividing the troupe. The new manager, Walter Hale, is trying to prevent Charlene, the troupe's "Story Lady", from recruiting the performers to form a union.

Meanwhile, the town has a scandal following the murder of the local pharmacist Wilby. Although a shady gambler is arrested, Walter realizes that the real killer is Nita, one of Wilby's employees.

Walter successfully gets Nita to confess during a Chautauqua performance, where she makes public the sexual harassment that Wilby directed at her. Nita's self-defense plea frees the wrongly jailed man, but Charlene is outraged that Walter used the crime to financially enrich the Chautauqua, and attempts to quit.

Walter attempts to reason with Charlene, but when she refuses to give in, he deceives her and uses the local police force to be sure that she must leave on the train with the rest of the troupe.

== Cast ==
- Elvis Presley as Walter Hale
- Marlyn Mason as Charlene
- Nicole Jaffe as Betty Smith
- Sheree North as Nita Bix
- Edward Andrews as Johnny
- John Carradine as Mr. Drewcolt
- Vincent Price as Mr. Morality
- Dabney Coleman as Harrison Wilby
- Duke Snider as The Cranker
- Anissa Jones as Carol Bix
- John Rubinstein as Princeton College kid
- Frank Welker as Rutgers College kid
- Joyce Van Patten as The Swimmer
- Pepe Brown as Willy

Cast notes

- Anissa Jones, best known for playing Buffy on the television program Family Affair, made her only film appearance in The Trouble with Girls.
- Nicole Jaffe and Frank Welker went on to become regular members of the voice cast for the Hanna-Barbera Saturday morning cartoon Scooby-Doo, which debuted on CBS ten days after the release of The Trouble with Girls.
- Danny Bonaduce, later to play Danny Partridge on TV's The Partridge Family, and Susan Olsen, soon to be Cindy Brady on The Brady Bunch, both appear uncredited in small roles during the auditions sequence: Bonaduce as a one-man band and Olsen as a child singer.

== Production ==
=== Development ===
In June 1959, it was announced that Don Mankiewicz would write a screenplay of an unpublished story by Mauri Grashin, Day Keene, and Dwight Babcock. By December 1960, with the project titled Chautauqua, MGM was ready to make the film with Glenn Ford. Rumours circulating in Hollywood at the time stated that Presley would co-star with Ford, Hope Lange, and Arthur O'Connell, but nothing came of it and the film was shelved.

In 1964, Dick Van Dyke had signed to star in a film titled Chautauqua based on a book called Morally We Roll Along by Gay MacLaren. After several years of failed screenplays and cast changes, MGM sold the rights to Columbia Pictures in May 1965. Columbia also struggled to get the project off the ground, and, in April 1968, sold the rights back to MGM.

This time MGM lined up Presley to star and production began in the fall of 1968. Chautauqua was the working title, but it was later changed to The Trouble with Girls when producers worried that audiences would not understand the title or be able to pronounce it.

=== Filming ===
Presley was paid $850,000 plus 50% of the profits. Production ran from October 28 to December 18, 1968.

Colonel Tom Parker, Presley's manager, originally wanted actress Jean Hale for the female lead, but Marlyn Mason was cast at the insistence of director Peter Tewksbury. Ironically, Hale's husband, Dabney Coleman, would later be cast.

Elvis was a big football fan and longed to make a football movie where he starred as a quarterback, so he jumped at the chance to play a lot of football on set when a scene was written into the film.

Vincent Price and John Carradine were cast because Elvis said they were his two favourite stars of horror movies and he wanted to be in a film with them.

Filming took place after Elvis' 1968 Comeback Special was shot, which he spoke about proudly to members of the cast and crew before the broadcast on NBC.

This is the only film Elvis starred in that does not have a fight scene with him in it.

Elvis knew all of the traditional songs in the film by heart.

Presley said to co-star Mason that he just wanted to make one good film before leaving Hollywood, because he knows the whole town is laughing at him.

Production photos of Presley and Mason with machine guns and cigars has long been considered proof of a more violent alternate cut influenced by Bonnie and Clyde. In the photos Presley is seen posing with a Tommy gun. Presley also isn't seen in any scenes in the film with Price. It's thought that Elvis and Price share scenes in this lost cut of the film.

== Release ==
The Trouble with Girls was released as the bottom half of a double feature, sharing the screen with the Raquel Welch drama Flareup.

Roger Greenspun of The New York Times called it "a charming though ineptly titled comedy" with Presley performing "a reasonably developed characterization as the chautauqua company manager, and he sings very well."

Variety wrote, "Elvis Presley is lost in this one. Without star’s usual assortment of 10 to 12 songs, and numbers cut down to a bare three, picture has little to offer. Title suggests a gay comedy but it’s a mass of contrived melodramatics and uninteresting performances that do not jell into anything but program fare."

Margaret Harford of the Los Angeles Times wrote that the film "never makes up its mind where to go and how to get there ... The trouble with the picture is not girls; it's indecision by the writers, Arnold and Lois Peyser about whether we should laugh at the corny entertainment of 40-odd years ago, or cry over the troubles of a lonely widow who drinks too much."

The Monthly Film Bulletin wrote, "The plot's rather curious blend of amateur theatricals, folksy humour and straight melodrama strains credulity even for a Presley film, and the few songs are instantly forgettable. Vincent Price makes an odd and quite appealing guest appearance as an itinerant lecturer known as Mr. Morality, but Presley himself seems uninterested in the whole affair."

== Soundtrack ==
Entering the studio for The Trouble with Girls, Presley found himself in the position of knowing he had the goods in the can with his looming comeback television special but given that his last three singles – "You'll Never Walk Alone," "Your Time Hasn't Come Yet Baby," "A Little Less Conversation" – and the Speedway album all tanked, faced a practically dead recording career. The soundtrack contained some minor songs, its only distinctive track by Billy Strange, the producer of the session, and Mac Davis.

The recording session took place at United Artists Recorders in Hollywood, on October 23, 1968. "Clean Up Your Own Backyard" by Strange and Davis, their fourth successful submission to a Presley soundtrack in a row, was the only one released concurrently with the film's release, as the single RCA 47-9747 in 1969, peaking at #35 on the Billboard Hot 100. "Almost" would appear in 1970 on the budget album Let's Be Friends, the only other track from the film to be released during Presley's lifetime. His remake of the His Hand in Mine track "Swing Down Sweet Chariot" would not see release until 1983 on Elvis: A Legendary Performer Volume 4. The other songs would wait to be issued until RCA's soundtrack compilations of the 1990s combining released songs and outtakes from multiple films on one compact disc.

Tracks

1. "Clean Up Your Own Backyard" (Billy Strange and Mac Davis)
2. "Swing Down Sweet Chariot" (traditional, arranged by Elvis Presley)
3. "Signs of the Zodiac" (Buddy Kaye and Ben Weisman, Duet with Marlyn Mason)
4. "Almost" (Buddy Kaye and Ben Weisman)
5. "The Whiffenpoof Song" (Ted Galloway, Meade Minnigerode, George Pomeroy; not used in film)
6. "Violet (Flower of NYU)" (Steven Dueker and Peter Lohstroh) – The second adaptation in Presley's career of the American Civil War song "Aura Lee" from 1861, the first being the song "Love Me Tender".

Notes

- In some versions of the soundtrack, "Doodle Doo Doo" is included, performed by Linda Sue Risk, who plays Lily-Jeanne, the mayor's daughter. In the film, the song is performed by Anissa Jones, who plays Carol Bix.
- "Clean Up Your Own Backyard" is noted for its anachronistic nature for a film set in 1927, from its modern-style arrangement to a verse referencing the term "armchair quarterback" which did not enter general use until the advent of television some 20 years after the setting of the film.

Personnel

- Elvis Presley – vocals
- The Blossoms, The Mellomen – backing vocals
- Jack Halloran, Ronald Hicklin, Marilyn Mason – backing vocals
- Roy Caton – trumpet
- Lew McCreary – trombone
- Buddy Collette – clarinet
- Gerry McGee, Joseph Gibbons, Morton Marker – electric guitar
- Don Randi – piano
- Max Bennett – bass
- John Guerin, Frank Carlson – drums

== Home media ==
The Trouble With Girls was released on homevideo in December 1988. It was released on DVD by Warner Home Video on August 7, 2007, as a Region 1 widescreen DVD.

== See also ==
- List of American films of 1969
