= Elvis: A Legendary Performer Volume 4 =

Compilation album by Elvis Presley
- Released: 1983
- Recorded: November 1955–June 10, 1972
- Genre: Rock and roll
- Label: RCA Records
- Producer: Joan Deary (reissue producer)

Elvis Presley chronology
I Was the One (1983)	Elvis: A Legendary Performer Volume 4 (1983)	Elvis' Gold Records Volume 5 (1984)

Elvis: A Legendary Performer Volume 4 is a compilation album featuring recordings by American singer Elvis Presley. It was the last in a series of albums that began with Elvis: A Legendary Performer Volume 1 in 1974, and the first since Elvis: A Legendary Performer Volume 3 in 1979. It was also the final album by any artist in the RCA A Legendary Performer series to be issued. This album was made up entirely of heretofore unissued recordings by Presley, with the exception of one track that was previously released in the Elvis Aron Presley boxed set in 1980.

== Content ==
This album marked the first official release of the version of "When it Rains, It Really Pours" that Presley recorded in November 1955 at Sun Records (he later rerecorded the song for RCA Victor). Also included was an alternate version of his 1958 hit, "One Night" entitled "One Night of Sin" which featured raunchier lyrics than the version RCA Victor released in the 1950s. A much-bootlegged song cut from the soundtrack of Presley's 1962 film Girls! Girls! Girls!, "Plantation Rock" is included as well, as is "The Lady Loves Me", a previously unreleased duet between Presley and Ann-Margret which had been featured in the 1964 film, Viva Las Vegas but never released by RCA Victor until this album. Also making its album-debut in this release is Elvis' late-1960s rerecording of the song "Swing Down, Sweet Chariot", previously performed on his 1960 Gospel LP, His Hand In Mine. This new rendition was featured in the 1969 movie The Trouble with Girls. Plus, there is an alternate take of "Wooden Heart", a song from the film G.I. Blues, which has a false start due to Elvis messing up part of the lyrics and subsequently laughing.

At the time of the album's release, the origin of two informal recordings released here for the first time: "I'm Beginning to Forget You" and a cover of Nat King Cole's "Mona Lisa" was marked as unknown, with the notation that the two recordings had been discovered at Graceland, Presley's mansion. Later, it was learned that the two recordings were among a number that Presley made informally in April 1959 while he was stationed in Germany. This collection is rounded off by a quartet of live performances: a previously unissued performance of "That's All Right" from the 1968 NBC Comeback Special, a 1969 Las Vegas outtake performance of "Are You Lonesome Tonight" in which Elvis begins laughing during the song (this is the album's sole previously released track, having appeared in the 1980 Elvis Aron Presley box set and previously marketed as "Are You Lonesome Tonight (The Laughing Version)"), and two performances from a 1972 appearance at Madison Square Garden in New York City (later reissued as part of the album An Afternoon in the Garden). An excerpt from a 1956 interview recording rounds out the collection.

== Track listing ==
Track listing with details from the liner notes

Side one
No.	Title	Writer(s)	Length
1.	"When It Rains, It Really Pours" (Recorded: Sun Studios, Memphis, November 1955; includes 2 false starts and studio chatter))	Billy "The Kid" Emerson	4:03
2.	"Interview" (Elvis interviewed by Ray and Norma Pillow, recorded in Tampa, Florida, 1956)	̶	2:09
3.	"One Night of Sin" (previously unissued alternate version of "One Night", recorded 1958)	Dave Bartholomew / Pearl King / Anita Steiman	2:34
4.	"I'm Beginning to Forget You" (private recording, April 1959)	Willie Phelps	3:00
5.	"Mona Lisa" (private recording, April 1959)	Ray Evans, Jay Livingston	2:28
6.	"Wooden Heart" (false start, studio chatter, and alternate take of this 1960 recording for the film G.I. Blues)	Bert Kaempfert, Kay Twomey, Ben Weisman, Fred Wise	3:20
7.	"Plantation Rock" (previously unissued track recorded in 1962 for Girls! Girls! Girls! but not used)	Bernie Baum, Buddy Kaye	1:52

Side two
No.	Title	Writer(s)	Length
1.	"The Lady Loves Me" (1963 duet with Ann-Margret recorded for Viva Las Vegas but unreleased until now)	Roy C. Bennett, Sid Tepper	3:42
2.	"Swing Down Sweet Chariot" (unreleased 1968 recording from the soundtrack of The Trouble with Girls; remake of a song Presley first recorded in 1960 for his album, His Hand in Mine)	Traditional	2:13
3.	"That's All Right (Mama)" (live version recorded at NBC Studios, Burbank, California for the 1968 TV special)	Arthur Crudup	3:04
4.	"Are You Lonesome Tonight" (previously released 1969 live version, recorded in Las Vegas; known as the Laughing Version" as Presley begins laughing during the performance)	Lou Handman, Roy Turk	2:51
5.	"Reconsider Baby" (previously unissued June 10, 1972 performance, recorded at Madison Square Garden)	Lowell Fulson	2:47
6.	"I'll Remember You" (previously unissued performance from the same Madison Square Garden show as above)	Kui Lee	2:35
