= Swing Down Sweet Chariot =

American Spiritual (Song)

"Swing Down Sweet Chariot" (sometimes "Swing Down, Ezekiel" or "Swing Down Chariot") is an American spiritual song. It tells the story of Ezekiel's vision of the chariot. The title and lyrics are very similar to the spiritual song "Swing Low, Sweet Chariot", and is thought to be an adaptation of said song. Composer and lyricist Wallis Willis is credited with composing "Swing Low, Sweet Chariot".

Popularized by the Golden Gate Quartet in the 1940s, it was recorded by Elvis Presley for his 1960 album His Hand in Mine and was re-recorded for his 1969 film The Trouble with Girls. The 1960 version featured backing vocals by the Jordanaires, and the re-recording featured the Mello Men on backing vocals. The version of the song from The Trouble with Girls was reissued in the 2010 boxed set The Complete Elvis Presley Masters, but this time, it features an all-female group singing background vocals.

American pianist/singer Billy Preston recorded "Swing Down Chariot" for his 1971 album I Wrote a Simple Song, with arrangement credited to Preston and Joe Greene.

The funk band Rufus did a version on their 1974 recording, Rags to Rufus, on ABC records. The six band members: Murphy, Fischer, Khan, Stockert, Belfield, Ciner, are credited with composition.

The song's chorus is quoted in the funk song "Mothership Connection (Star Child)", released in 1975 by Parliament. That portion of "Mothership Connection" is, in turn, sampled by Dr. Dre in his Grammy Award-winning rap song, "Let Me Ride".

The song was covered in Icelandic in 1993 as "Gullvagninn" by Björgvin Halldórsson, becoming a hit in Iceland.
