= Peter Guralnick =

American screenwriter (born 1943)

- Born: December 15, 1943 (age 82); Boston, Massachusetts, U.S.
- Education: Boston University College of Arts and Sciences
- Occupations: Author; music critic
- Writing career
- Period: 1971−present

Peter Guralnick (born December 15, 1943, in Boston, Massachusetts) is an American music critic, author, and screenwriter. He specializes in the history of early rock and roll and has written books on Elvis Presley, Sam Phillips, and Sam Cooke.

== Career ==
Guralnick graduated from Boston University in 1971 with a master's degree in creative writing. He then began writing books about the history of rock'n'roll, blues, country music, and soul music. Music critic Nat Hentoff called Guralnick a "...national treasure"; Bob Dylan said Guralnick's book, Last Train to Memphis "...cancels out all others".

Guralnick's first two books, Almost Grown (1964) and Mister Downchild (1967), were collections of short stories published by the Larry Stark Press, a small press in Cambridge, Massachusetts, devoted to stories and poems. Mona Dickson, writing in MIT's The Tech (May 13, 1964) gave Almost Grown a favorable review.

His two-volume biography of Elvis Presley, Last Train to Memphis: The Rise of Elvis Presley in 1994, followed by Careless Love: The Unmaking of Elvis Presley in 1999, placed the story of Presley's career into a rise and fall arc. Encompassing more than 1,300 pages (including 1,150 pages of text), the work was an in-depth, scholarly examination of Presley's life and music. Guralnick previously wrote about Presley in the 1976 first edition of The Rolling Stone Illustrated History of Rock & Roll; his article has been reprinted in each subsequent edition. He also contributed the complete text for the 240-page hardcover book accompanying the 2010 30-disc CD boxed set, The Complete Elvis Presley Masters.

In contrast to contemporaries such as Lester Bangs, Ian Penman and Nick Tosches, whose music writings are marked by idiosyncratic, self-referential and highly personal styles, Guralnick's writing is characterized by a colloquial approach that is clean and understated by comparison. He has been called "the dean of rock 'n' roll storytellers".

Guralnick wrote the 727-page biography of influential record producer Sam Phillips entitled Sam Phillips: The Man Who Invented Rock 'n' Roll. He also penned the script for A&E's documentary of the same name, narrated by Billy Bob Thornton. On October 21, 2016, it was announced that Leonardo DiCaprio will portray Sam Phillips in the forthcoming film based on Guralnick's book. Guralnick scripted the Grammy Award-winning Sam Cooke – Legend, narrated by Jeffrey Wright.

He has written liner notes for albums including Charlie Rich's last album Pictures and Paintings and the last three Jerry Lee Lewis albums Last Man Standing, Mean Old Man and Rock and Roll Time.

He began teaching at Vanderbilt University in Nashville in 2005 in the Masters in Fine Arts program, ranked by Poets & Writers Magazine as one of the top 15 such programs in the US. He was inducted into the Blues Hall of Fame in 2010; his works – Feel Like Going Home: Portraits in Blues, Country and Rock 'n' Roll, Lost Highway: Journeys & Arrivals of American Musicians, Sweet Soul Music: Rhythm & Blues and the Southern Dream of Freedom were designated as blues literature classics.

He won a Grammy for his liner notes for Sam Cooke Live at the Harlem Square Club in 1994, one of his six nominations for the award. He wrote and co-produced a documentary film: Sam Phillips: The Man Who Invented Rock 'n' Roll. He also wrote the script for the blues documentary, Feel like Going Home, directed by Martin Scorsese.

In 2020, he released Looking to Get Lost, a "book about creativity," featuring subjects like songwriters Doc Pomus and Leiber & Stoller, musicians Johnny Cash, Solomon Burke and Tammy Wynette, among others, and of writers Lee Smith and Henry Green, as well as Elvis Presley's infamous manager, Colonel Tom Parker.

The Peter Guralnick Collection is located in the Southern Folklife Collection of the Wilson Library of the University of North Carolina at Chapel Hill.

In August 2025, Guralnick will publish a new biography of Colonel Tom Parker, The Colonel and the King, based on previously unpublished correspondence from the Colonel's archives.

== Personal life ==
Peter Guralnick's parents were oral surgeon Walter Guralnick, DMD, who helped to establish dental insurance in Massachusetts through Delta Dental, and Betty Marson Guralnick. Peter also has a sister, Susan and brother, Thomas. In 1971, he succeeded his grandfather as director of an athletic camp for boys, Camp Alton on Lake Winnipesaukee in Wolfeboro, New Hampshire. The camp closed in 1992. He has been married for over 45 years to Alexandra. They have a son and daughter, Jacob and Nina.

== Books ==
- Peter Guralnick (1964). Almost Grown. Cambridge, Massachusetts: Larry Stark Press.
- —— (1967). Mister Downchild. Cambridge, Massachusetts: Larry Stark Press.
- —— (1971). Feel Like Going Home: Portraits in Blues, Country, and Rock 'n' Roll. Outerbridge & Dienstfrey. ISBN 0-87690-046-5. Reprinted 1999. ISBN 0-316-33272-0
- —— (1979). Lost Highway: Journeys & Arrivals of American Musicians. Little, Brown. ISBN 0-316-33274-7.
- —— (1980). Nighthawk Blues: A Novel. Thunder's Mouth Press. ISBN 0-938410-64-4.
- —— (1982). The Listener's Guide to The Blues. New York: Facts on File.
- —— (1986). Sweet Soul Music: Rhythm and Blues and the Southern Dream of Freedom. Little, Brown. ISBN 0-316-33273-9.
- —— (1989). Searching for Robert Johnson. Penguin. ISBN 0-452-27949-6.
- —— (1994). Last Train to Memphis: The Rise of Elvis Presley. Back Bay. ISBN 0-316-33225-9.
- —— (1999). Careless Love: The Unmaking of Elvis Presley. Little, Brown. ISBN 0-316-33297-6.
- ——; Ernst Jørgensen (1999). Elvis Day by Day: The Definitive Record of His Life and Music. Ballantine Books. ISBN 0-345-42089-6.
- —— (2005). Dream Boogie: The Triumph of Sam Cooke. Little, Brown. ISBN 978-0-316-37794-2. OCLC 57393650.
- —— (2015). Sam Phillips: The Man Who Invented Rock'n'Roll. Little, Brown.
- —— (2020). Looking to Get Lost. Little, Brown.
- —— (2025). The Colonel and the King: Tom Parker, Elvis Presley and the Partnership that Rocked the World. Little, Brown. ISBN 978-0-316-39944-9.

== Interviews ==
- "An Interview with Peter Guralnick" by Griffin Ondaatje and Craig Proctor, Brick: A Literary Journal, Issue 62, Spring 1999.
- Sholtes, Peter S. (13 January 1999). ""Caught in a Trap": Interview with Peter Guralnick". City Pages. Archived from the original on 28 May 2001.
- Music Historian Peter Guralnick — Serious Jibber Jabber with Conan O'Brien (YouTube). 4 June 2013.

== Grammy Awards ==
Year	Category	Nominated work	Result
1984	Grammy Award for Best Album Notes	Big Maybelle: The Okeh Sessions	Nominated
1986	Grammy Award for Best Album Notes	Sam Cooke: Live at the Harlem Square Club, 1963	Won
1988	Grammy Award for Best Album Notes	Elvis Presley: The Complete Sun Sessions	Nominated
1993	Grammy Award for Best Album Notes	Elvis: The King of Rock 'N' Roll - The Complete 50's Masters	Nominated
1994	Grammy Award for Best Album Notes	Elvis: From Nashville to Memphis, The Essential 60's Masters I	Nominated
1995	Grammy Award for Best Album Notes	Sam Cooke's SAR Records Story	Nominated
