= His Hand in Mine =

Studio album by Elvis Presley
- Released: November 23, 1960
- Recorded: October 30 and 31, 1960
- Studio: RCA Studio B (Nashville)
- Genre: Gospel
- Length: 28:08
- Label: RCA Victor
- Producer: Steve Sholes

Elvis Presley chronology
G.I. Blues (1960)	His Hand in Mine (1960)	Elvis by Request (1961)

Professional ratings
Review scores
Source	Rating
AllMusic	4.5/5 stars
Christgau's Record Guide	C
MusicHound	4/5 stars
The Rolling Stone Album Guide	5/5 stars
Rough Guides	3/5 stars

His Hand in Mine is the fifth studio album by American singer and musician Elvis Presley, released on November 23, 1960, by RCA Victor in mono and stereo, catalog number LPM/LSP 2328. It was the first of three gospel albums that Presley would issue during his lifetime. (Note: The other two being How Great Thou Art (1967) and He Touched Me (1972)) Recording sessions took place on October 30 and 31, 1960, at RCA Studio B in Nashville, Tennessee. The album peaked at #13 on the Top Pop Albums chart. It was certified Gold on April 9, 1969, and Platinum on March 27, 1992, by the Recording Industry Association of America.

== Background ==
Presley had a lifelong, fundamental love of church music, and often used it to rehearse and loosen up before concerts and at the beginning of recording sessions. Presley had earlier devoted an extended play single, Peace in the Valley, to his love for gospel songs, and was eager to record a full album of this music. This fit well with the plans of Presley's manager, Colonel Tom Parker, to steer his client into a family-friendly image as he switched Presley's career concentration toward movie stardom in Hollywood.

== Content ==
All the selections for His Hand In Mine were completed in one fourteen-hour session. The songs "Surrender" and "Crying in the Chapel" were recorded during the session, but were withheld for later issue as singles. "Surrender" would be his first single of 1961 and top the chart, but "Crying in the Chapel" would wait until April 1965 to be issued, going to #3 on the chart. The song "In My Father's House" was arranged and adapted by Elvis Presley which was published by Elvis Presley Music.

Presley later re-recorded "Swing Down Sweet Chariot" (not to be confused with the popular "Swing Low, Sweet Chariot") for the soundtrack of his 1969 film, The Trouble with Girls.

== Single releases ==
"His Hand in Mine" is a gospel song written by Mosie Lister and first recorded by the Statesmen Quartet in 1953. Presley's version was recorded on October 30, 1960 and was the title track of his 1960 gospel album. The song was released nine years later as an Easter single on March 25, 1969. The B-side was a more recent recording of "How Great Thou Art". Neither side charted and the record sold poorly.

== Reissues ==
In 1976, RCA reissued the album in its lower priced "Pure Gold" series, with new cover art under a new catalog number, ANL1-1319. This reissue contains the same tracks as the original release. In 1981, the album was reissued in RCA's "Best Buy" series, with the 1976 cover art and catalog number changed to AYL1-3935. RCA first reissued the album on compact disc in 1988 with three bonus tracks ("It Is No Secret", "You'll Never Walk Alone" and "Who Am I"). This CD reissue utilized the revised cover art from the "Pure Gold" and "Best Buy" series LP reissues.

On March 11, 2008, RCA released a remastered version of this album on CD, adding as bonus tracks the four songs which had originally appeared on that 1957 EP single Peace in the Valley, its contents later incorporated into Elvis' Christmas Album. Follow That Dream, the Presley fan-club reissue label, released an extended two-disc version of the His Hand in Mine album the same year.

== Personnel ==
Credits sourced from Keith Flynn's research of AFM contracts and RCA paperwork.

- Elvis Presley – vocals, acoustic guitar
- The Jordanaires – backing vocals
- Millie Kirkham – backing vocals
- Scotty Moore – electric guitar
- Hank Garland – acoustic guitar
- Floyd Cramer – piano
- Bob Moore – double bass
- D.J. Fontana, Buddy Harman – drums
- Boots Randolph – saxophone
- Charlie Hodge – harmony and backing vocals on "His Hand in Mine", "I Believe in the Man in the Sky", and "He Knows Just What I Need"

== Track listing ==
=== Original release ===
Side one
No.	Title	Writer(s)	Recording date	Length
1.	"His Hand in Mine"	Mosie Lister	October 30, 1960	3:15
2.	"I’m Gonna Walk Dem Golden Stairs"	Culley Holt	October 31, 1960	1:49
3.	"In My Father's House"	Aileene Hanks (Arranged and adapted by Elvis Presley)	October 31, 1960	2:03
4.	"Milky White Way"	Lander Coleman (Arranged and adapted by Elvis Presley)	October 30, 1960	2:12
5.	"Known Only to Him"	Stuart Hamblen	October 31, 1960	2:07
6.	"I Believe in the Man in the Sky"	Richard Howard	October 30, 1960	2:11

Side two
No.	Title	Writer(s)	Recording date	Length
1.	"Joshua Fit the Battle"	Traditional (Arranged and adapted by Elvis Presley)	October 31, 1960	2:39
2.	"He Knows Just What I Need"	Mosie Lister	October 30, 1960	2:12
3.	"Swing Down Sweet Chariot"	Traditional (Arranged and adapted by Elvis Presley)	October 31, 1960	2:32
4.	"Mansion Over the Hilltop"	Ira Stanphill	October 31, 1960	2:55
5.	"If We Never Meet Again"	Albert E. Brumley	October 31, 1960	1:58
6.	"Working on the Building"	Winifred O. Hoyle, Lillian Bowles	October 31, 1960	1:52

=== 2008 reissue bonus tracks ===
Tracks 1–12 consist of the original album's content. The following bonus tracks were originally issued on the Peace in the Valley EP in 1957 and then included on Elvis' Christmas Album:
No.	Title	Writer(s)	Recording date	Length
13.	"(There'll Be) Peace in the Valley (For Me)"	Thomas A. Dorsey	January 13, 1957	3:22
14.	"It Is No Secret (What God Can Do)"	Stuart Hamblen	January 19, 1957	3:53
15.	"I Believe"	Ervin Drake, Irvin Graham, Jimmy Shirl, Al Stillman	January 12, 1957	2:05
16.	"Take My Hand, Precious Lord"	Thomas A. Dorsey	January 13, 1957	3:16

=== 2008 Follow That Dream reissue ===
Disc1

The album
No.	Title	Length
1.	"His Hand in Mine" (Mosie Lister)	3:17
2.	"I'm Gonna Walk Dem Golden Stairs" (Cully Holt)	1:52
3.	"In My Father's House (Are Many Mansions)"	2:06
4.	"Milky White Way" (Arranged and adapted by Elvis Presley)	2:15
5.	"Known Only to Him" (Stuart Hamblen)	2:09
6.	"I Believe in the Man in the Sky" (Richard Howard)	2:14
7.	"Joshua Fit the Battle" (Arranged and adapted by Elvis Presley)	2:40
8.	"Jesus Knows What I Need" (Mosie Lister)	2:13
9.	"Swing Down Sweet Chariot" (Arranged and adapted by Elvis Presley)	2:33
10.	"Mansion over the Hilltop" (Ira Stamphill)	2:57
11.	"If We Never Meet Again" (Albert E. Brumley)	1:59
12.	"Working on the Building" (W.O. Hoyle/Lillian Bowles)	1:54

The singles
No.	Title	Length
13.	"Surrender" (Doc Pomus/Mort Shuman)	1:55
14.	"Crying in the Chapel" (Artie Glenn)	2:27

First takes
No.	Title	Length
15.	"His Hand in Mine" (take 1)	3:41
16.	"I'm Gonna Walk Dem Golden Stairs" (take 1)	1:59
17.	"Milky White Way" (takes 1*, 2*, 3)	3:05
18.	"Known Only to Him" (takes 1, 2)	2:26
19.	"I Believe in the Man in the Sky" (take 1)	2:27
20.	"Joshua Fit the Battle" (take 1)	2:52
21.	"He Knows Just What I Need" (take 1)	2:02
22.	"Mansion over the Hilltop" (takes 2*, 1)	4:04
23.	"If We Never Meet Again" (take 1)	2:02
24.	"Working on the Building" (take 1)	2:01
25.	"Surrender" (take 1)	2:01

Disc 2

Session outtakes
No.	Title	Length
1.	"Milky White Way" (takes 4, 6*, 5)	3:27
2.	"His Hand in Mine" (takes 2*, 3*)	2:05
3.	"His Hand in Mine" (takes 4)	3:39
4.	"His Hand in Mine" (take 5)	3:23
5.	"I Believe in the Man in the Sky" (takes 2*, 3*, 4)	4:02
6.	"He Knows Just What I Need" (takes 2*, 3*, 4*)	3:46
7.	"He Knows Just What I Need" (takes 5*, 6, 7)	3:43
8.	"He Knows Just What I Need" (take 8*)	2:20
9.	"Surrender" (take 2)	2:00
10.	"Surrender" (takes 3*, 5, 6)	3:33
11.	"Surrender" (take 7*)	1:46
12.	"Surrender" (takes 8*, 9)	2:38
13.	"Surrender" (WP takes 2/1*, 3*, 4*, 5*, 6*, 7*)	4:32
14.	"In My Father's House (Are Many Mansions)" (takes 1*, 2*, 3*, 4*)	3:07
15.	"In My Father's House (Are Many Mansions)" (takes 5*, 6*)	1:47
16.	"In My Father's House (Are Many Mansions)" (take 7)	2:19
17.	"Joshua Fit the Battle" (take 2)	2:56
18.	"Joshua Fit the Battle" (take 3*)	2:00
19.	"Swing Down Sweet Chariot" (take 1*)	2:48
20.	"Swing Down Sweet Chariot" (takes 2, 3)	2:58
21.	"I'm Gonna Walk Dem Golden Stairs" (takes 2, 3)	2:34
22.	"I'm Gonna Walk Dem Golden Stairs" (take 4*)	2:12
23.	"I'm Gonna Walk Dem Golden Stairs" (take 5)	2:05
24.	"Known Only to Him" (takes 3*, 4*, 5)	3:46
25.	"Crying in the Chapel" (take 1*)	1:35
26.	"Crying in the Chapel" (takes 2, 3-M)	3:16
27.	"Working on the Building" (take 2*)	2:17
28.	"Working on the Building" (takes 3*, 4)	2:26

* previously unissued
