= Elvis: A Legendary Performer Volume 2 =

Greatest hits album by Elvis Presley
- Released: January 8, 1976
- Recorded: July 5, 1954–January 14, 1973
- Genre: Rock
- Length: 26:38
- Label: RCA Records

Elvis Presley chronology
Today (1975)	Elvis: A Legendary Performer Volume 2 (1976)	The Sun Sessions (1976)

Elvis: A Legendary Performer Volume 2 is a compilation album featuring recordings by American singer and musician Elvis Presley. As with the first volume of the series, issued in 1974, the collection was a mixture of previously released and never-before-released recordings.

The album was certified Gold on October 25, 1977 and Platinum and 2× Platinum on July 15, 1999 by the RIAA.

== Content ==
In this second volume of Presley recordings in the RCA Records Legendary Performer series, is the first release of "Harbor Lights", a ballad Presley recorded in July 1954, during his first session for Sun Records. This LP marked the first time since 1965 that RCA had released any unissued recordings from Sun Records. Other previously unreleased material on the album included an alternate take of Presley's 1956 hit "I Want You, I Need You, I Love You", several previously unissued performances from the 1968 NBC TV special, the song "A Cane and a High Starched Collar" (the RCA 8 track tape version of the album had a false start to this song) from the soundtrack of the 1960 film Flaming Star, and Presley's 1960 recording of "Such a Night" (the 8 track tape version had several false starts to this song). A pair of previously unreleased interview recordings were also included on this album.

The Legendary Performer series would continue with Elvis: A Legendary Performer Volume 3, which was released posthumously in 1978.

Similar to the 1989 release on compact disc of A Legendary Performer Volume 1 with a truncated track listing, RCA also reissued Volume 2 on a budget-priced CD in 1989, omitting some of the tracks from the original LP. Missing from this CD version are "the Interview With Jay Thompson", "Blue Christmas", "A Cane and a High Starched Collar", and "Presentation of Award (1961)."

Professional ratings
Review scores
Source	Rating
Allmusic	link

== Track listing ==
Side A
No.	Title	Writer(s)	Recording date	Length
1.	"Harbor Lights" (previously unreleased Sun master)	Jimmy Kennedy, Hugh Williams	July 5, 1954	2:35
2.	"Interview with Elvis: Jay Thompson"		April 9, 1956	3:34
3.	"I Want You, I Need You, I Love You" (previously unreleased alternate take)	Ira Kosloff, George Mysels	April 11, 1956	2:40
4.	"Blue Suede Shoes" (previously unreleased live version)	Carl Perkins	June 27, 1968	1:37
5.	"Blue Christmas"	Billy Hayes and Jay Johnson	September 5, 1957	2:30
6.	"Jailhouse Rock"	Jerry Leiber and Mike Stoller	June 14, 1957	2:25
7.	"It's Now or Never"	Eduardo di Capua, Wally Gold, Aaron Schroeder	April 3, 1960	3:12

Side B
No.	Title	Writer(s)	Recording date	Length
1.	"A Cane and a High Starched Collar" (previously unreleased)	Sid Tepper, Roy C. Bennett	August 12, 1960	2:40
2.	"Presentation of Awards to Elvis"		March 25, 1961	1:24
3.	"Blue Hawaii" (previously unreleased live version)	Ralph Rainger, Leo Robin	January 14, 1973	2:29
4.	"Such a Night"	Lincoln Chase	April 4, 1960	3:36
5.	"Baby, What You Want Me to Do" (previously unreleased live version)	Jimmy Reed	June 27, 1968	1:44
6.	"How Great Thou Art"	Stuart K. Hine	May 25, 1966	2:58
7.	"If I Can Dream"	Walter Earl Brown	June 30, 1968	3:14
