= When It Rains, It Really Pours =

"When It Rains, It Really Pours" is a song originally written and recorded by Billy "The Kid" Emerson. His version, titled "When It Rains It Pours", was released by Sun Records in 1954. The song was later recorded by Elvis Presley in 1957, but not released until 1965 on the album Elvis for Everyone.

== Emerson's version ==
Emerson’s version of the song was recorded on October 27, 1954, at Sun Recording Studio in Memphis, Tennessee with Sam Phillips as the producer. It was released on January 8, 1955, as Sun 214, as the B-side to the song "Move Baby Move" which did not chart.

The session consisted of the following personnel—Emerson, piano: Elven Parr, guitar: Robert Prindell, drums: Charles Smith, alto sax: Bennie Moore, tenor sax and trumpet: Luther Taylor.

== Elvis Presley's recordings ==
"When It Rains, It Really Pours"

Song by Elvis Presley

from the album Elvis for Everyone
- Released: August 10, 1965
- Recorded: February 24, 1957
- Length: 1:47
- Label: RCA Victor
- Songwriter: Billy "The Kid" Emerson

Presley had initially attempted to record the song while at Sun Records in November 1955, with Elvis and Scotty Moore on guitars, Bill Black on bass and Johnny Bernero on drums, but it was never completed as his contract with Sun was sold to RCA Records around the same time. All the tapes of Presley's Sun recordings were handed to RCA as part of the deal, with most of them being included on albums released shortly afterwards. Presley's 1955 recording of "When It Rains, It Really Pours", however, was not released. It was lost for several years until 1982 when it was found and finally released officially as part of the 1983 compilation album Elvis: A Legendary Performer Volume 4.

Presley was recorded performing the song during the Million Dollar Quartet session on December 4, 1956.

On February 24, 1957, Presley again recorded the song, this time for RCA. This version also went unreleased until it appeared on the 1965 album Elvis for Everyone. The musicians on this session were Moore and Presley on guitars, Black on bass, Fontana on drums, Dudley Brooks on piano and the Jordanaires singing backup.

In 1968, during rehearsals for the television special Elvis, Presley was recorded singing it as a potential song for the show. Although the song was not chosen for the special, the rehearsal was released on The Complete '68 Comeback Special CD released in 2008.
