= Elvis: A Legendary Performer Volume 3 =

Compilation album by Elvis Presley
- Released: November 1978
- Recorded: July 2, 1956–February 17, 1970
- Genre: Rock and roll
- Label: RCA Records

Elvis Presley chronology
A Canadian Tribute (1978)	Elvis: A Legendary Performer Volume 3 (1978)	Our Memories of Elvis (1979)

Elvis: A Legendary Performer Volume 3 is a compilation album featuring recordings by American singer Elvis Presley. It was the third in a series of albums that began with Elvis: A Legendary Performer Volume 1 in 1974, the first to be released since Presley's death in 1977, and the last edition until Elvis: A Legendary Performer Volume 4 in 1983. Following the format of the series, the album was a mixture of previously released recordings and tracks that, as of the date of this album's release, had never been issued on an official RCA album release. It was certified Gold in December, 1978 by the RIAA.

== Content ==
Included in this instalment of the Legendary Performer series is "Danny", a previously unissued recording from 1958 of what was at one point to be the theme song for Presley's film King Creole (when the film still retained the title of the novel upon which it was based, A Stone for Danny Fisher). "Britches", a song recorded for but dropped from the music-lite western Flaming Star makes its debut, as do two production number recordings cut from the 1968 NBC Comeback Special - remakes of Presley movie songs "It Hurts Me" and "Let Yourself Go". A previously unreleased live performance from Las Vegas in 1970, two alternate takes from movie soundtracks, and an alternate take from Presley's first post-Army single from 1960 round out the set, along with an interview recording from 1956 and several previously released numbers.

RCA issued two versions of this album: one in standard black vinyl, and another as a picture disc.

== Track listing ==
Side one
No.	Title	Length
1.	"Hound Dog" (previously released)	2:15
2.	"Interview" (excerpts from an interview with TV Guide, August 1956*)	7:08
3.	"Danny" (unreleased 1958 recording cut from King Creole)	1:50
4.	"Fame and Fortune" (previously unissued alternate take from 1960)	2:26
5.	"Frankfort Special" (previously unissued alternate take, recorded in 1960 for G.I. Blues)	2:15
6.	"Britches" (previously unissued, unused recording from 1960's Flaming Star)	1:39
7.	"Crying in the Chapel" (previously released)	2:24

*Parts of this interview were released as a promotional record in 1956

Side two
No.	Title	Length
1.	"Surrender" (previously released)	1:53
2.	"Guadalajara" (previously unissued alternate take from the 1963 film, Fun in Acapulco)	2:43
3.	"It Hurts Me" (previously unissued version from the 1968 NBC Special)	2:29
4.	"Let Yourself Go" (previously unissued version from the 1968 NBC Special)	2:34
5.	"In the Ghetto" (previously released)	2:45
6.	"Let It Be Me" (previously unreleased live performance from 1970)	4:07
