= Elvis: A Legendary Performer Volume 1 =

Compilation album by Elvis Presley
- Released: January 2, 1974
- Recorded: July 5, 1954 – June 27, 1968
- Genre: Rock and roll, rockabilly, blues, pop
- Label: RCA Records

Elvis Presley chronology
Raised on Rock/For Ol' Times Sake (1973)	Elvis: A Legendary Performer Volume 1 (1974)	Good Times (1974)

Professional ratings
Review scores
Source	Rating
Christgau's Record Guide	B

Elvis: A Legendary Performer Volume 1 is a compilation album by American singer and musician Elvis Presley issued in 1974 by RCA Records. It features 14 tracks, which includes twelve songs and two interviews with Presley. It was certified Gold on January 8, 1975, Platinum and 2× Platinum on July 15, 1999, and 3× Platinum, by the Recording Industry Association of America (RIAA) on March 8, 2018.

== Content ==
Elvis: A Legendary Performer Volume 1 opens with his first recording from 1954, "That's All Right", the song that started his recording career at Sun Records.

Ultimately, four volumes devoted to Presley were released over the next decade in RCA's A Legendary Performer series, the only RCA Victor recording artist other than Glenn Miller to have multiple volumes issued in that series. The series is also notable for the first release of several previously unissued recordings by Presley, with each successive volume containing increasing amounts of unreleased material. This first volume included previously unissued live performances of several songs from Presley's 1968 TV special, an alternate version of his first known recording for Sun Records ("I Love You Because"), and the first American release of "Tonight's All Right for Love", previously available only on European pressings of the G.I. Blues album. The two interview recordings were originally issued by RCA Victor in 1958 as the EP, Elvis Sails.

Although RCA Victor had released a few alternate takes of Presley studio recordings in the past—for example, two different takes of the song "Old Shep" from his second LP Elvis from 1956, and two different takes of the song "Lover Doll" from the soundtrack to the film King Creole were released on the official 1958 soundtrack album and the reissue EP King Creole Volume 1 —this was the first time the company began seriously issuing such material, although releases of alternate takes and unissued recordings by Presley would not begin on a large scale until after his death in August, 1977. Elvis: A Legendary Performer Volume 3 issued in November, 1978, consisted almost entirely of previously unreleased recordings.

In 1989, RCA reissued the album on a budget-priced compact disc with a truncated track listing; omitted were "I Love You Because," "Love Me," "Love Me Tender", "(Now and Then There's) A Fool Such as I," and "Are You Lonesome To-night." The version of "Trying to Get to You" was replaced by Elvis' 1955 Sun Recording.

== Track listing ==
Side A
No.	Title	Writer(s)	Recording date	Length
1.	"That's All Right"	Arthur "Big Boy" Crudup	July 6, 1954	1:33
2.	"I Love You Because" (previously unreleased take)	Leon Payne	July 6, 1954	3:27
3.	"Heartbreak Hotel"	Mae Boren Axton, Tommy Durden, Elvis Presley	January 10, 1956	2:08
4.	"Elvis"	—	September 22, 1958	0:34
5.	"Don't Be Cruel"	Otis Blackwell, Elvis Presley	July 2, 1956	2:03
6.	"Love Me" (from Elvis TV special)	Jerry Leiber and Mike Stoller	June 27, 1968	2:32
7.	"Tryin' to Get to You" (from Elvis TV special)	Rose Marie McCoy, Charles Singleton	June 27, 1968	2:33

Side B
No.	Title	Writer(s)	Recording date	Length
1.	"Love Me Tender"	Vera Matson, Elvis Presley	August 24, 1956	2:42
2.	"Peace in the Valley"	Thomas A. Dorsey	January 13, 1957	3:20
3.	"Elvis' Farewell to His Fans"	—	September 22, 1958	2:14
4.	"(Now and Then There's) A Fool Such as I"	Bill Trader	June 11, 1958	2:30
5.	"Tonight's All Right for Love" (from the European edition of G.I. Blues)	Joseph J. Lilley, Abner Silver, Sid Wayne	May 6, 1960	1:20
6.	"Are You Lonesome Tonight?" (from Elvis TV special)	Lou Handman, Roy Turk	June 27, 1968	3:31
7.	"Can't Help Falling in Love"	George David Weiss, Luigi Creatore, Hugo Peretti	March 23, 1961	3:00

== Personnel ==
- Elvis Presley - lead vocals, rhythm guitar, percussion
- Scotty Moore - lead guitar, rhythm guitar
- Hank Garland - lead guitar
- Bill Black - double bass
- Bob Moore - double bass
- D.J. Fontana - drums, percussion
- Buddy Harman - drums, percussion
- Floyd Cramer - piano
- Alan Fortas - percussion
- Lance LeGault - tambourine
- Charlie Hodge - acoustic rhythm guitar
