= Arthur Crudup =

American blues singer, songwriter and guitarist (1905–1974)

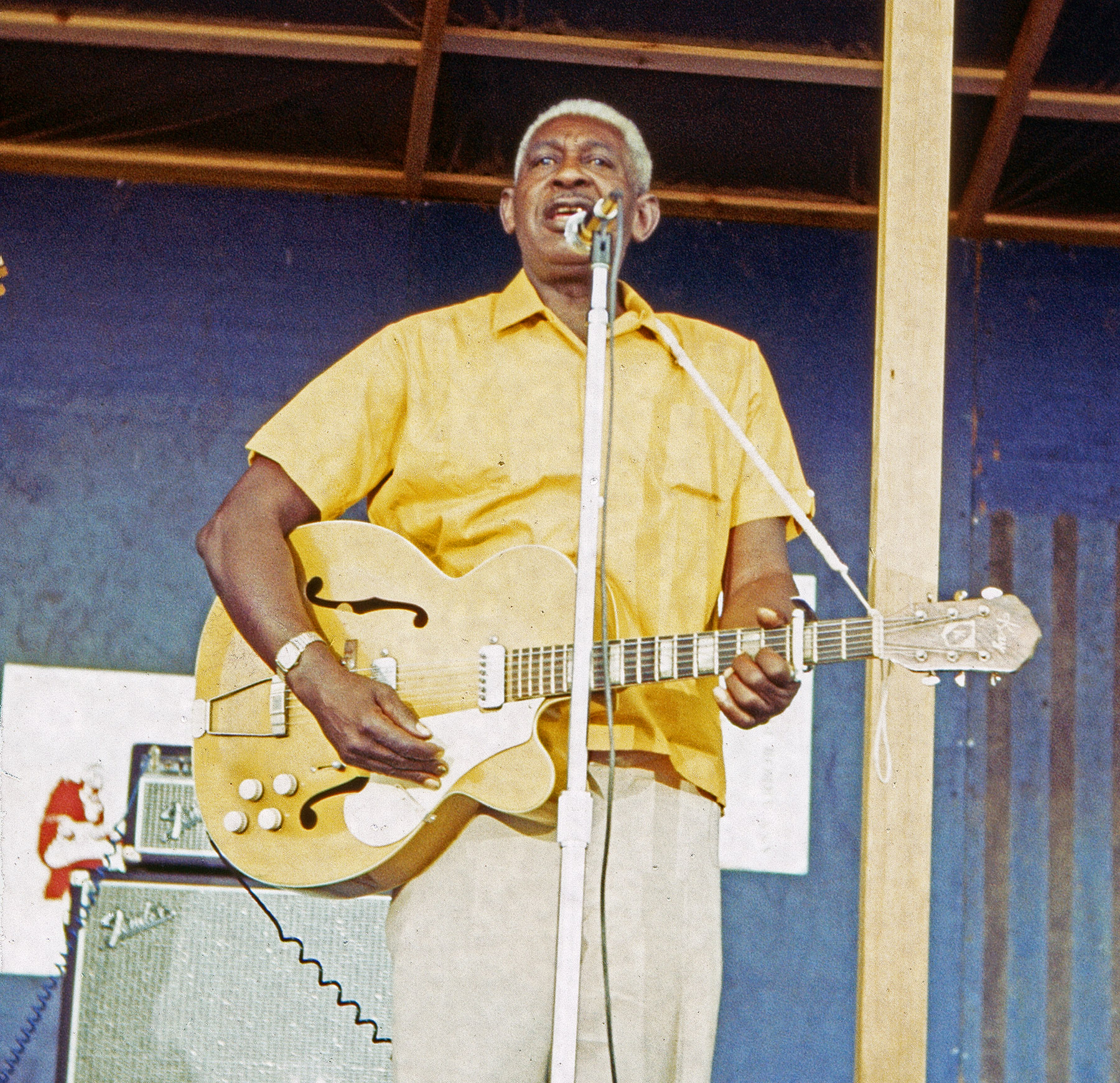
- Crudup at the 1969 Ann Arbor Blues Festival

Background information
- Also known as: Big Boy Crudup; Elmer James; Percy Lee Crudup
- Born: Arthur William Crudup; August 24, 1905; Forest, Mississippi, U.S.
- Died: March 28, 1974 (aged 68) Nassawadox, Virginia, U.S.
- Genres: Blues; Delta blues
- Instruments: Guitar; vocals
- Years active: 1939–1973
- Labels: Bluebird; Delmark

Arthur William "Big Boy" Crudup (August 24, 1905 – March 28, 1974) was an American Delta blues singer, songwriter and guitarist. He is best known, outside blues circles, for his songs "That's All Right" (1946), "My Baby Left Me" and "So Glad You're Mine", later recorded by Elvis Presley and other artists.

== Early life ==
Crudup was born on August 24, 1905, in Union Grove, Forest, Mississippi, to a family of migrant workers traveling through the South and Midwest. The family returned to Mississippi in 1926, where he sang gospel music. He had lessons with a local bluesman, Papa Harvey, and later he was able to play in dance halls and cafes around Forest. Around 1940 he went to Chicago.

== Musical career ==
He began his career as a blues singer around Clarksdale, Mississippi. As a member of the Harmonizing Four, he visited Chicago in 1939. He stayed in Chicago to work as a solo musician but barely made a living as a street singer. The record producer Lester Melrose allegedly found him. while Crudup was living in a packing crate, introduced him to Hudson Whittaker, better known as Tampa Red, and signed him to a recording contract with RCA Victor's Bluebird label.

=== Recordings ===
He recorded with RCA in the late 1940s and with Ace Records, Checker Records and Trumpet Records in the early 1950s. He toured black clubs in the South, sometimes playing with Sonny Boy Williamson II and Elmore James. He also recorded under the names 'Elmer James' and 'Percy Lee Crudup'. His songs "Mean Old 'Frisco Blues", "Who's Been Foolin' You" and "That's All Right" were popular in the South. These and his other songs "Rock Me Mama", "So Glad You're Mine", and "My Baby Left Me" have been recorded by many artists, including Elvis Presley, Slade, Elton John and Rod Stewart.

Crudup stopped recording in the 1950s because of disputes over royalties. He said, "I realised I was making everybody rich, and here I was poor". His last Chicago session was in 1951. His 1952–1954 recording sessions for Victor were held at radio station WGST, in Atlanta, Georgia. He returned to recording, for Fire Records and Delmark Records, and touring in 1965. Sometimes labeled "The Father of Rock and Roll", he accepted this title with some bemusement. During this time Crudup worked as a laborer to augment the low wages he received as a singer. After a dispute with Melrose over royalties, he returned to Mississippi and took up bootlegging. He later moved to Virginia, where he lived with his family, including three sons and several of his siblings, and worked as a field laborer. He occasionally sang in and supplied moonshine to drinking establishments, including one called the Do Drop Inn, in Franktown, Northampton County.

=== Later years ===
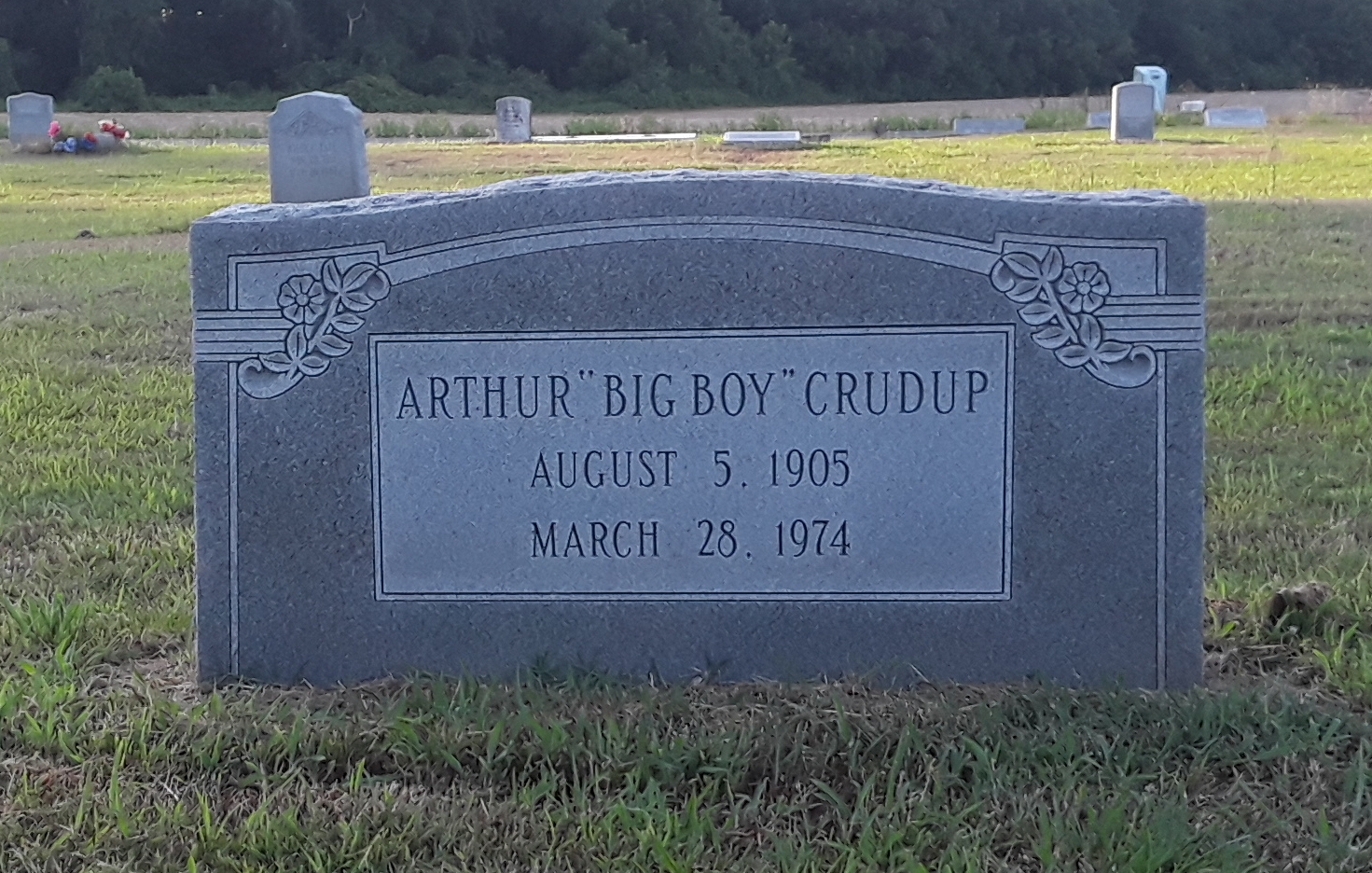
Crudup's grave, in Franktown, Virginia

In 1968, the blues promoter Dick Waterman began fighting for Crudup's royalties and reached an agreement in which Crudup would be paid $60,000. However, Hill and Range Songs, from which he was supposed to get the royalties, refused to sign the legal papers at the last minute, because the company thought it could not lose more money in legal action. In the early 1970s, two Virginia activists, Celia Santiago and Margaret Carter, assisted Crudup in an attempt to gain royalties he felt he were due, with little success. By 1971, he had collected over $10,000 in overdue royalties through the intervention of the Songwriters Guild of America (then called the American Guild of Authors and Composers).

On a 1970 trip to the United Kingdom, Crudup recorded "Roebuck Man" with local musicians. His last professional engagements were with Bonnie Raitt. Recognizing his fortunes would not change, Crudup said in 1970, "I was born poor, I live poor, and I am going to die poor."

== Death ==
Crudup died of complications of heart disease and diabetes in the Nassawadox hospital in Northampton County, Virginia, on March 28, 1974, four years after the failed royalty settlement.

== Legacy ==
Crudup has been honored with a marker on the Mississippi Blues Trail, placed at Forest. Elvis Presley acknowledged Crudup's importance to rock and roll when he said, "If I had any ambition, it was to be as good as Arthur Crudup".

One of the experts who consider Crudup's "That's All Right" to be the "first rock and roll song" is Southeastern Louisiana University rock historian Joseph Burns. He adds that "this song could contain the first ever guitar solo break". Another source is equally definitive, stating that the recording "stands as a convincing front-runner for rock ‘n’ roll's ground zero".

A 2004 article in The Guardian argues that rather than Presley's version being one of the first records of rock and roll, it was simply one of "the first white artists' interpretations of a sound already well-established by black musicians almost a decade before [...] a raucous, driving, unnamed variant of rhythm and blues".

The Blues Hall of Fame stated that Crudup "became known as 'The Father of Rock ‘n’ Roll' after Elvis Presley recorded three of his songs" but adds that "Crudup was a classic victim of music industry exploitation, and despite the commercial success of his music, was never able to even support his family from his music". The Hall quotes Presley as having said, "Down in Tupelo, Mississippi, I used to hear old Arthur Crudup bang his box the way I do now, and I said if I ever got to the place I could feel all old Arthur felt, I’d be a music man like nobody ever saw".

== Discography ==
=== Solo albums ===
- Mean Ol' Frisco (Fire, 1962)
- Crudup's Mood (Delmark, 1969)
- Look on Yonder's Wall (Delmark, 1969)
- Roebuck Man (United Artists Records, 1970)

=== Collaborative albums ===
- Sunny Road, with Jimmy Dawkins and Willie Smith (Delmark, 1969)
- Arthur "BigBoy" Crudup Meets the Master Blues Bassists, with Willie Dixon and Ransom Knowling (Delmark, 1994)

=== Compilation albums ===
- The Father of Rock and Roll (RCA, 1971)
- Give Me a 32-30 (Crown Prince, 1982)
- Star Bootlegger (Krazy Kat, 1982)
- I'm in the Mood (Krazy Kat, 1983)
- Crudup's Rockin' Blues (RCA, 1985)
- Shout Sister Shout! (Bullwhip, 1987)
- That's All Right Mama (Matchbox, 1989)
- The Father of Rock and Roll (Blues Encore, 1992)
- That's All Right Mama (BMG, 1992)
- Complete Recorded Works, vols. 1–4 (Document, 1993)
- Rock Me Mama (Orbis, 1993)
- That's Alright Mama (Laserlight, 1995)
- Crudup's After Hours (History, 1996)
- The Complete Arthur "Big Boy" Crudup, vols. 1 and 2 (Jazz Tribune, 1997)
- After Hours (Camden, 1997)
- Cool Disposition (Catfish, 1999)
- Dirt Road Blues (Past Perfect Silver Line, 2000)
- The Essential Arthur Crudup (Document, 2001)
- Blues Legends (Rainbow, 2002)
- Everything's Alright (Our World, 2002)
- Crudup's After Hours (Past Perfect Silver Line, 2002)
- Rock Me Mama (Tomato, 2003)
- The Father of Rock 'n' Roll (Wolf, 2003)
- Rock Me Mamma: When the Sun Goes Down, vol. 7 (RCA, 2003)
- The Story of the Blues (Archive Blues, 2004)
- Too Much Competition (Passport, 2006)
- Gonna Be Some Change (Rev-Ola, 2008)
- My Baby Left Me: The Definitive Collection (Fantastic Voyage, 2011)
- The Blues (Fuel, 2012)
- Sunny Road (Delmar, 2013)
- That's All Right (Mama): The Fire Sessions (Sunset Blvd, 2022)

=== Charted singles ===
Year	Single	Chart positions	
Year	Single	US	US R&B
1945	"Rock Me Mamma"	–	3
1945	"Who's Been Foolin' You"	–	5
1945	"Keep Your Arms Around Me"	–	3

== See also ==
- Checker Records
- Fire Records
- First rock and roll record
- Origins of rock and roll
