= List of UK top-ten albums in 1958 =

The UK Albums Chart is one of many music charts compiled by the Official Charts Company that calculates the best-selling albums of the week in the United Kingdom. Before 2004, the chart was only based on the sales of physical albums. This list shows albums that peaked in the Top 5 (top 10 from November) of the UK Albums Chart during 1958, as well as albums which peaked in 1957 or 1959 but were in the top 5/10 in 1958. The entry date is when the album appeared in the top 5/10 for the first time (week ending, as published by the Official Charts Company, which is six days after the chart is announced).

Thirty albums were in the top five/ten this year. Five albums from 1957 remained in the top 5 for several weeks at the beginning of the year, while Frank Sinatra Sings for Only the Lonely by Frank Sinatra, Oh Boy!: Original Television Soundtrack credited to various artists and Pack Up Your Troubles by Russ Conway were all released in 1958 but did not reach their peak until 1959. Three artists scored multiple entries in the top 5/10 in 1958. The Crickets, Ella Fitzgerald, Johnny Mathis, Perry Como and Russ Conway were among the artists who achieved their first UK charting top 5/10 album in 1958.

The 1957 Christmas number-one album, The King and I credited to various artists, remained at number one for the first eight weeks of 1958. The first new number-one album of the year was Pal Joey credited to various artists. Five different albums peaked at number-one in 1958.

== Background ==
=== Multiple entries ===
Thirty albums charted in the top 5/10 in 1958, with twenty-three albums reaching their peak this year.

Three artists scored multiple entries in the top 5/10 in 1958. Frank Sinatra secured the record for most hit albums in 1958 with seven entries. Perry Como's two entries were both released this year.

=== Chart debuts ===
Eight artists achieved their first top 5/10 album in 1958 as a lead artist. Perry Como had two entries in his breakthrough year.

The following table (collapsed on desktop site) does not include does not include acts who had previously charted as part of a group and secured their first top 10 solo album, or featured appearances on compilations or other artists recordings.

Artist	Number of top 10s	First entry	Chart position	Other entries
The Crickets	1	The "Chirping" Crickets	5	—
Perry Como	2	We Get Letters (Volume 2)	4	Dear Perry (6)
Ella Fitzgerald	1	Ella Fitzgerald Sings the Irving Berlin Songbook	5	—
Johnny Mathis	1	Warm	6	—
Tom Lehrer	1	Songs by Tom Lehrer	8	—
Russ Conway	1	Pack Up Your Troubles ^{[A]}	6	—
Pat Boone	1	Stardust	10	—

=== Soundtrack albums ===
Cast recordings from various films and musicals made the top 5/10 this year. These included Carousel, The Duke Wore Jeans, My Fair Lady, The Pajama Game, Pal Joey and South Pacific.

== Top-five albums ==
Key

Symbol	Meaning
‡	Album peaked in 1956 or 1957 but still in chart in 1958.
♦	Album released in 1958 but peaked in 1959.
(#)	Year-end top ten album position and rank
Entered	The date that the album first appeared in the chart.
Peak	Highest position that the song reached in the UK Albums Chart.

Entered (week ending)	Weeks in top 10	Single	Artist	Peak	Peak reached (week ending)	Weeks at peak
Albums in 1956
28 July 1956	67	Rodgers and Hammerstein's Oklahoma!: Original Soundtrack ‡ ^{[C]}^{[D]}^{[E]}	Various artists	1	29 September 1956	3
28 July 1956	28	Rodgers and Hammerstein's Carousel: Original Soundtrack ‡ ^{[C]}^{[E]}^{[F]}	Various artists	1	11 August 1956	6
22 September 1956	94	The King and I: Original Soundtrack ‡ ^{[C]}^{[E]}^{[G]}	Various artists	1	13 October 1956	48
Albums in 1957
31 August 1957	25	Loving You	Elvis Presley	1	7 September 1957	3
7 September 1957	20	A Swingin' Affair! ^{[H]}	Frank Sinatra	1	21 September 1957	7
30 November 1957	6	Elvis' Christmas Album	Elvis Presley	2	21 December 1957	2
Albums in 1958
4 January 1958	15	Songs for Swingin' Lovers ^{[E]}^{[I]}	Frank Sinatra	4	4 January 1958	3
18 January 1958	22	Pal Joey: Original Soundtrack ^{[C]}	Various artists	1	1 February 1958	11
8 February 1958	10	The Pajama Game: Original Soundtrack ^{[C]}^{[J]}	Various artists	3	15 February 1958	6
1 March 1958	5	Where Are You?	Frank Sinatra	3	15 March 1958	1
12 April 1958	12	The Duke Wore Jeans: Original Soundtrack ^{[C]}^{[K]}	Various artists	1	19 April 1958	3
19 April 1958	1	The "Chirping" Crickets	The Crickets	5	19 April 1958	1
3 May 1958	180	South Pacific: Original Soundtrack ^{[C]}^{[E]}	Various artists	1	8 November 1958	115
10 May 1958	122	My Fair Lady ^{[E]}	Original Broadway Cast	1	10 May 1958	19
21 June 1958	12	This Is Sinatra Volume 2	Frank Sinatra	3	21 June 1958	8
28 June 1958	7	We Get Letters (Volume 2) ^{[L]}	Perry Como	4	12 July 1958	1
12 July 1958	13	Lonnie	Lonnie Donegan	3	16 August 1958	4
19 July 1958	1	Ella Fitzgerald Sings the Irving Berlin Song Book	Ella Fitzgerald	5	19 July 1958	1
13 September 1958	22	King Creole ^{[E]}	Elvis Presley	1	20 September 1958	7
13 September 1958	26	Come Fly with Me ^{[E]}	Frank Sinatra	2	4 October 1958	3
11 October 1958	40	Elvis' Golden Records ^{[E]}^{[M]}	Elvis Presley	2	25 October 1958	1
8 November 1958	2	Warm ^{[E]}	Johnny Mathis	6	8 November 1958	1
8 November 1958	5	Dear Perry ^{[E]}^{[N]}	Perry Como	6	6 December 1958	1
8 November 1958	3	Songs by Tom Lehrer ^{[E]}^{[O]}	Tom Lehrer	8	22 November 1958	1
22 November 1958	6	Pack Up Your Troubles ♦ ^{[E]}^{[P]}	Russ Conway	6	3 January 1959	1
22 November 1958	1	Stardust ^{[E]}	Pat Boone	10	22 November 1958	1
29 November 1958	1	The Frank Sinatra Story ^{[E]}	Frank Sinatra	8	29 November 1958	1
6 December 1958	19	The Student Prince and The Great Caruso ♦ ^{[E]}	Mario Lanza	4	17 October 1959	1
13 December 1958	14	Oh Boy!: Original Television Soundtrack ♦ ^{[E]}	Various artists	4	3 January 1959	2
13 December 1958	13	Frank Sinatra Sings for Only the Lonely ♦ ^{[E]}^{[Q]}	Frank Sinatra	5	17 January 1959	1

== Entries by artist ==
The following table shows artists who achieved two or more top 5/10 entries in 1958, including albums that reached their peak in 1957 and 1959. The figures only include main artists, with featured artists and appearances on compilation albums not counted individually for each artist. The total number of weeks an artist spent in the top five/ten in 1958 is also shown.

Entries	Artist	Weeks	Albums
7	Frank Sinatra ^{[R]}^{[S]}	44	A Swingin' Affair!, Come Fly with Me, Frank Sinatra Sings for Only the Lonely, Songs for Swingin' Lovers, The Frank Sinatra Story, This Is Sinatra Volume 2, Where Are You?
4	Elvis Presley ^{[R]}	23	Elvis' Christmas Album, Elvis' Golden Records, King Creole, Loving You
2	Perry Como	12	Dear Perry, We Get Letters (Volume 2)

== Notes ==
- ^{a} Pack Up Your Troubles reached its peak of number six on 3 January 1959 (week ending).
- ^{b} The Student Prince/The Great Caruso reached its peak of number four on 17 October 1959 (week ending).
- ^{c} Recordings credited to Original Soundtrack by the Official Charts Company but all had different artists as featured performers.
- ^{d} Rodger and Hammerstein's Oklahoma re-entered the top 5 at number 3 on 29 March 1958 (week ending) for 3 weeks and at number 5 on 26 April 1958 (week ending) for 2 weeks. It re-entered the newly expanded top 10 at number 9 on 8 November 1958 (week ending) for 2 weeks, at number 7 on 29 November 1958 (week ending) for 2 weeks and at number 10 on 20 December 1958 (week ending) for 5 weeks.
- ^{e} Figure include weeks spent in the newly expanded top 10 (from 8 November 1958, week ending).
- ^{f} Rodger and Hammerstein's Carousel originally peaked at number 1 upon its initial release in 1956. It re-entered the expanded top 10 at number 8 on 6 December 1958 (week ending), at number 9 on 10 January 1959 (week ending) and at number 10 on 25 April 1959 (week ending).
- ^{g} The King and I re-entered the top 5 at number 5 on 9 August 1958 (week ending) and at number 5 on 23 August 1958 (week ending) for 3 weeks. It re-entered the newly expanded top 10 at number 7 on 8 November 1958 (week ending) for 15 weeks.
- ^{h} A Swingin' Affair re-entered the top 5 at number 4 on 11 January 1958 (week ending).
- ^{i} Songs for Swingin' Lovers originally peaked at number 1 upon its initial release in 1956. It re-entered the top 5 at number 4 on 4 January 1958 (week ending) for 4 weeks, at number 5 on 15 February 1958 (week ending) for 10 weeks and at number 9 on 15 November 1958 (week ending).
- ^{j} The Pajama Game re-entered the top 5 at number 3 on 5 April 1958 (week ending) and at number 4 on 19 April 1958 (week ending) for 2 weeks.
- ^{k} The Duke Wore Jeans re-entered the top 5 at number 5 on 5 July 1958 (week ending).
- ^{l} We Get Letters (Volume 2) re-entered the top 5 at number 5 on 26 July 1958 (week ending) for 4 weeks.
- ^{m} Elvis' Golden Records re-entered the newly expanded top 10 at number 8 on 11 April 1959 (week ending) for 3 weeks, at number 10 on 23 May 1959 (week ending), at number 9 on 13 June 1959 (week ending) for 8 weeks and at number 9 on 29 August 1959 (week ending).
- ^{n} Dear Perry re-entered the top 10 at number 6 on 6 December 1958 (week ending) for 2 weeks.
- ^{o} Songs by Tom Lehrer re-entered the top 10 at number 8 on 22 November 1958 (week ending) for 2 weeks.
- ^{p} Pack Up Your Troubles re-entered the top 10 at number 10 at number 9 on 20 December 1958 (week ending) for 3 weeks
- ^{q} Frank Sinatra Sings For Only the Lonely re-entered the top 10 at number 9 on 28 March 1959 (week ending).
- ^{r} Figure includes album that peaked in 1957.
- ^{s} Figure includes album that peak in 1959.

== See also ==
- 1958 in British music
- List of number-one albums from the 1950s (UK)
