= List of UK top-ten albums in 1959 =

The UK Albums Chart is one of many music charts compiled by the Official Charts Company that calculates the best-selling albums of the week in the United Kingdom. Before 2004, the chart was only based on the sales of physical albums. This list shows albums that peaked in the Top 5 (top 10 from November) of the UK Albums Chart during 1959, as well as albums which peaked in 1958 or 1960 but were in the top 5/10 in 1959. The entry date is when the album appeared in the top 5/10 for the first time (week ending, as published by the Official Charts Company, which is six days after the chart is announced).

Thirty-nine albums were in the top ten this year. Three albums from 1956 and eleven albums from 1958 remained in the top 10 for several weeks at the beginning of the year, while Songs for Swingin' Sellers by Peter Sellers and Time to Celebrate by Russ Conway were both released in 1959 but did not reach their peak until 1960. Five artists scored multiple entries in the top 10 in 1959. were among the artists who achieved their first UK charting top 10 album in 1959.

West Side Story progressed to its peak position of number three in 1962. Frank Sinatra Sings for Only the Lonely by Frank Sinatra, Oh Boy!: Original Television Soundtrack credited to various artists, Pack Up Your Troubles by Russ Conway, Songs by Tom Lehrer by Tom Lehrer and The Student Prince/The Great Caruso by Mario Lanza were the albums from 1958 to reach their peak in 1959.

The 1958 Christmas number-one album, South Pacific: Original Soundtrack credited to Various artists, remained at number one for the duration of 1959.

== Background ==
=== Multiple entries ===
Thirty-nine albums charted in the top 10 in 1959, with twenty-eight albums reaching their peak this year.

Five artists scored multiple entries in the top 10 in 1959. Frank Sinatra secured the record for most hit albums in 1959 with five entries. Peter Sellers' three albums and Duane Eddy's two entries were all released this year.

=== Chart debuts ===
The following table (collapsed on desktop site) does not include does not include acts who had previously charted as part of a group and secured their first top 10 solo album, or featured appearances on compilations or other artists recordings.

Artist	Number of top 10s	First entry	Chart position	Other entries
Peter Sellers	3	The Best of Sellers	3	The Goon Show (8), Songs for Swingin' Sellers (3)
Mantovani	1	Continental Encores	4	—

=== Soundtrack albums ===
Cast recordings from various films and musicals made the top 5/10 this year. These included Carousel, The Duke Wore Jeans, My Fair Lady, The Pajama Game, Pal Joey and South Pacific.

== Top-ten albums ==
Key

Symbol	Meaning
‡	Album peaked in 1956 or 1958 but still in chart in 1959.
♦	Album released in 1959 but peaked in 1960.
Entered	The date that the album first appeared in the chart.
Peak	Highest position that the song reached in the UK Albums Chart.

Entered (week ending)	Weeks in top 10	Single	Artist	Peak	Peak reached (week ending)	Weeks at peak
Albums in 1956
28 July 1956	67	Rodgers and Hammerstein's Oklahoma!: Original Soundtrack ‡ ^{[]}^{[]}	Various artists	1	29 September 1956	3
28 July 1956	28	Rodgers and Hammerstein's Carousel: Original Soundtrack ‡ ^{[C]}^{[]}	Various artists	1	11 August 1956	6
22 September 1956	94	The King and I: Original Soundtrack ‡ ^{[C]}^{[]}	Various artists	1	13 October 1956	48
Albums in 1958
4 January 1958	15	Songs for Swingin' Lovers ‡ ^{[]}^{[]}	Frank Sinatra	4	4 January 1958	3
3 May 1958	180	South Pacific: Original Soundtrack ‡ ^{[]}^{[]}	Various artists	1	8 November 1958	115
10 May 1958	122	My Fair Lady ‡ ^{[]}	Original Broadway Cast	1	10 May 1958	19
13 September 1958	22	King Creole ‡ ^{[]}	Elvis Presley	1	20 September 1958	7
13 September 1958	26	Come Fly with Me ‡ ^{[]}	Frank Sinatra	2	4 October 1958	3
11 October 1958	40	Elvis' Golden Records ‡ ^{[]}	Elvis Presley	2	25 October 1958	1
8 November 1959	16	Songs by Tom Lehrer	Tom Lehrer	7	13 June 1959	1
22 November 1958	6	Pack Up Your Troubles ^{[]}	Russ Conway	6	3 January 1959	1
6 December 1958	19	The Student Prince and The Great Caruso	Mario Lanza	4	17 October 1959	1
13 December 1958	14	Oh Boy!: Original Television Soundtrack	Various artists	4	3 January 1959	2
13 December 1958	13	Frank Sinatra Sings for Only the Lonely	Frank Sinatra	5	17 January 1959	1
Albums in 1959
24 January 1959	14	West Side Story	Original Broadway Cast	6	4 April 1959	1
24 January 1959	1	Swing Softly	Johnny Mathis	10	24 January 1959	1
31 January 1959	5	Como's Golden Records	Perry Como	4	31 January 1959	1
31 January 1959	79	Gigi: Original Soundtrack	Various artists	2	28 March 1959	32
14 February 1959	39	The Best of Sellers	Peter Sellers	3	12 September 1959	3
21 February 1959	12	Continental Encores	Mantovani	4	21 February 1959	6
4 April 1959	9	Elvis Presley Rock 'N' Roll	Elvis Presley	4	11 April 1959	4
18 April 1959	31	Cliff	Cliff Richard and The Drifters	4	9 May 1959	2
2 May 1959	43	The Buddy Holly Story	Buddy Holly and The Crickets	2	16 May 1959	1
2 May 1959	10	Songs to Sing in Your Bath	Russ Conway	8	15 August 1959	2
9 May 1959	13	Curtains Up	Various artists	4	30 May 1959	2
16 May 1959	28	Come Dance with Me!	Frank Sinatra	2	23 May 1959	2
6 June 1959	3	Have 'Twangy' Guitar Will Travel	Duane Eddy	6	12 September 1959	1
8 August 1959	15	A Date with Elvis	Elvis Presley	4	22 August 1959	1
22 August 1959	8	Look to Your Heart	Frank Sinatra	5	29 August 1959	1
5 September 1959	2	Frankie Vaughan at the London Palladium	Frankie Vaughan	6	5 September 1959	1
19 September 1959	16	Family Favourites	Russ Conway	3	3 October 1959	2
26 September 1959	4	Strictly for Grown Ups	Paddy Roberts	8	26 September 1959	2
26 September 1959	3	Gypsy Camp Fires	101 Strings	9	3 October 1959	2
10 October 1959	5	Porgy and Bess: Original Soundtrack	Various artists	7	17 October 1959	2
31 October 1959	6	Especially for You	Duane Eddy	6	31 October 1959	2
14 November 1959	31	Cliff Sings	Cliff Richard	2	14 November 1959	15
28 November 1959	7	The Goon Show	The Goons	8	12 December 1959	3
12 December 1959	22	Songs for Swingin' Sellers ♦	Peter Sellers	3	16 January 1960	3
19 December 1959	7	Time to Celebrate ♦	Russ Conway	3	2 January 1960	2

== Entries by artist ==
The following table shows artists who achieved two or more 10 entries in 1959, including albums that reached their peak in 1958 and 1960. The figures only include main artists, with featured artists and appearances on compilation albums not counted individually for each artist. The total number of weeks an artist spent in the top ten in 1959 is also shown.

Entries	Artist	Weeks	Albums
5	Frank Sinatra		Come Dance with Me!, Come Fly with Me, Frank Sinatra Sings for Only the Lonely, Look to Your Heart, Songs for Swingin' Lovers
4	Elvis Presley		A Date with Elvis, Elvis' Golden Records, Elvis Presley Rock 'N' Roll, King Creole
4	Russ Conway		Family Favourites, Pack Up Your Troubles, Songs to Sing in Your Bath, Time to Celebrate
3	Peter Sellers		The Best of Sellers, The Goon Show, Songs for Swingin' Sellers, The Goons
2	Duane Eddy		Especially for You, Have Twangy Guitar Will Travel

== Notes ==
- Recordings credited to Original Soundtrack by the Official Charts Company but all had different artists as featured performers.
- Elvis Rock 'N' Roll originally peaked at number-one upon its initial release in 1956.
- Figure includes album that peaked in 1958.
- Figure includes album that peak in 1960.
- Songs for Swingin' Sellers reached its peak of number three on 16 January 1960 (week ending).

== See also ==
- 1959 in British music
- List of number-one albums from the 1950s (UK)
