= List of best-selling albums of the 1950s in the United Kingdom =

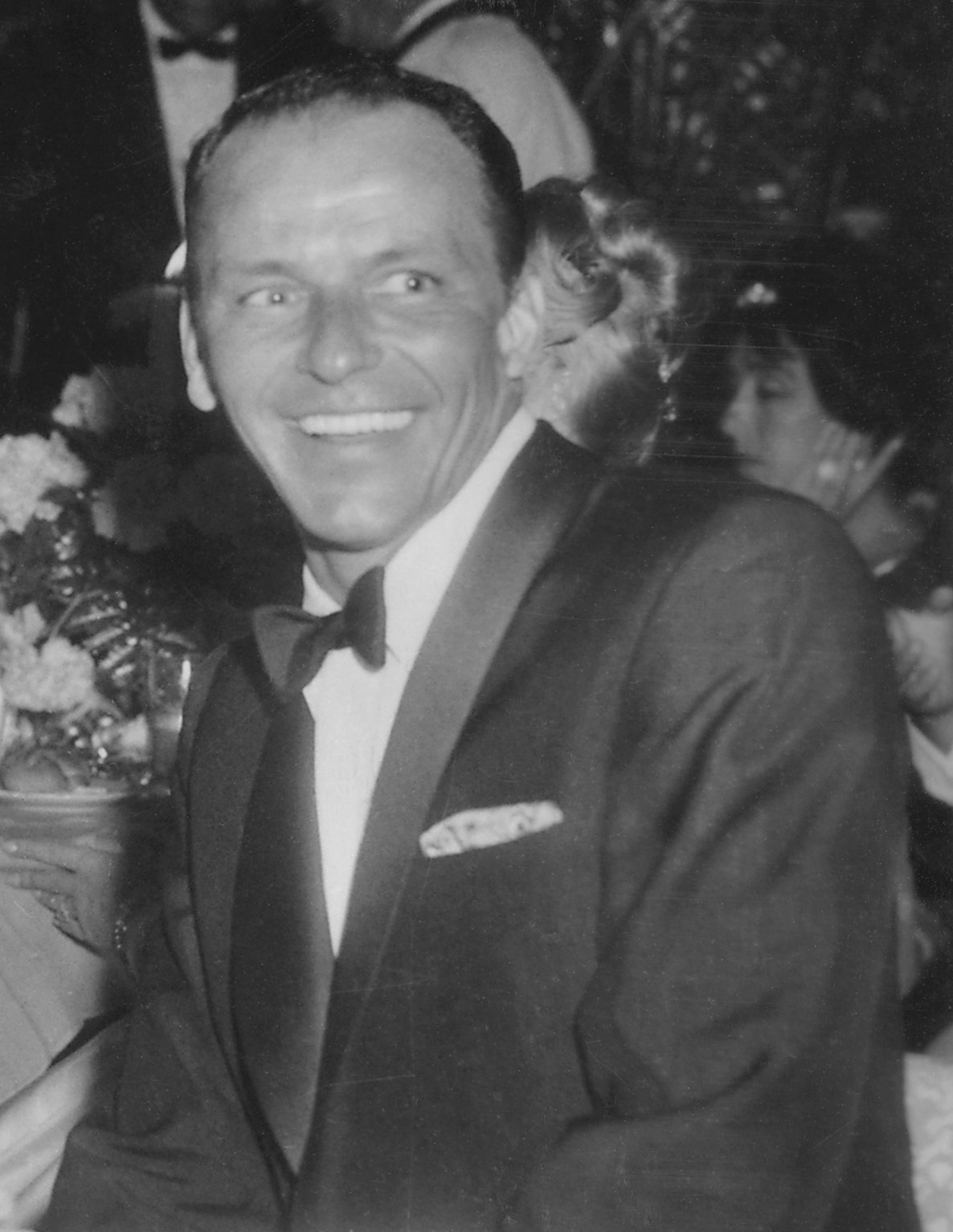
Frank Sinatra had the fourth best-selling album of the 1950s with Songs for Swingin' Lovers!

An album is defined by the Official Charts Company (OCC) as being a type of music release that features more than four tracks and lasts longer than 25 minutes; from July 1956, sales of albums in the United Kingdom were monitored by music magazine Record Mirror. From November 1958, album sales were also compiled by music magazine Melody Maker. The biggest-selling album of the 1950s was the original soundtrack to the movie South Pacific.

== Albums ==
Best-selling albums of the 1950s in the UK
No.	Album	Artist	Record label (Note: The record labels, years and chart peaks are those given by the OCC.)	Year	Chart peak
1	South Pacific	Original soundtrack	RCA Victor	1958	1
2	My Fair Lady	Original Broadway cast	Philips	1958	1
3	Oklahoma!	Original soundtrack	Capitol	1956	1
4	Songs for Swingin' Lovers!	Frank Sinatra	Capitol	1956	1
5	West Side Story	Original Broadway cast	Columbia	1957	3
6	Showcase	Lonnie Donegan	Pye Nixa	1956	2
7	Come Dance with Me!	Frank Sinatra	Capitol	1959	2
8	Elvis' Golden Records	Elvis Presley	Parlophone	1958	2
9	My Fair Lady	Original London cast		1959	
10	The King and I	Original soundtrack	Capitol	1956	1
