= List of artists who have achieved simultaneous UK and U.S. number-one hits =

A number of recording artists have achieved either simultaneous number-one singles or albums on the official charts in the United Kingdom and the United States (Billboard in the US and the Official Charts Company from the UK, also the BPI).

As of 2020, twelve artists have achieved this feat simultaneously in both the singles and albums chart: the Beatles, the Monkees, Simon & Garfunkel, Rod Stewart, Men at Work, Michael Jackson, Beyoncé, Drake, Ed Sheeran, Taylor Swift, Ariana Grande, and Lady Gaga. All of these have been at number one in all four charts on the same week.

The single that has spent the longest period of time at number one simultaneously in the UK and US is Ed Sheeran's "Shape of You" in 2017, which spent 11 weeks number-one in both countries, while the longest-serving album is the South Pacific soundtrack (1958) which spent 26 weeks number-one in both countries.

== Simultaneous number-one singles ==
=== 1950s ===
- Perry Como – "Don't Let the Stars Get in Your Eyes", 6 February 1953 (one week)
- Pérez Prado – "Cherry Pink (and Apple Blossom White)", 29 April – 6 May (two weeks)
- Guy Mitchell – "Singing the Blues", 4, 18 January, 1 February 1957 (three weeks)
- Tab Hunter – "Young Love", 1–22 March 1957 (four weeks)
- Paul Anka – "Diana", 6 September 1957 (one week)
- Bobby Darin – "Mack the Knife", 16–23 October 1959 (two weeks)

=== 1960s ===
- The Everly Brothers – "Cathy's Clown", 26 May – 16 June 1960 (four weeks)
- The Beatles – "Can't Buy Me Love", 2–16 April 1964 (three weeks)
- The Beatles – "A Hard Day's Night", 30 July – 6 August 1964 (two weeks)
- Roy Orbison – "Oh, Pretty Woman", 8 October 1964 (one week)
- The Beatles – "I Feel Fine", 24 December 1964 – 7 January 1965 (three weeks)
- Sonny & Cher – "I Got You Babe", 26 August 1965 (one week)
- The Rolling Stones – "Get Off of My Cloud", 4–11 November 1965 (two weeks)
- The Beatles – "We Can Work It Out", 6–13 January 1966 (two weeks)
- Nancy Sinatra – "These Boots Are Made for Walkin'", 24 February 1966 (one week)
- The Beatles – "Paperback Writer", 23 June 1966 (one week)
- The Monkees – "I'm a Believer", 19 January – 9 February 1967 (four weeks)
- Nancy Sinatra and Frank Sinatra – "Somethin' Stupid", 13–20 April 1967 (two weeks)
- The Beatles – "Hello, Goodbye", 27 December 1967 – 10 January 1968 (three weeks)
- The Beatles – "Get Back", 24–30 May 1969 (two weeks)
- The Rolling Stones – "Honky Tonk Women", 20 August 1969 (one week)

=== 1970s ===
- Simon and Garfunkel – "Bridge Over Troubled Water", 28 March – 4 April 1970 (two weeks)
- Rod Stewart – "Maggie May", 9–30 October 1971 (four weeks)
- Tony Orlando and Dawn – "Tie a Yellow Ribbon Round the Ole Oak Tree", 21 April – 12 May 1973 (four weeks)
- Elton John and Kiki Dee – "Don't Go Breaking My Heart", 7–28 August 1976 (four weeks)
- Bee Gees – "Night Fever", 29 April – 6 May 1978 (two weeks)
- The Commodores – "Three Times a Lady", 19 August 1978 (one week)
- Gloria Gaynor – "I Will Survive", 19 March, 7 April 1979 (two weeks)

=== 1980s ===
- Blondie – "Call Me", 26 April 1980 (one week)
- Barbra Streisand – "Woman in Love", 25 October – 8 November 1980 (three weeks)
- Men at Work – "Down Under", 29 January 1983 (one week)
- Michael Jackson – "Billie Jean", 5 March 1983 (one week)
- Stevie Wonder – "I Just Called to Say I Love You", 13 October 1984 (one week)
- Foreigner – "I Want to Know What Love Is", 2 February 1985 (one week)
- USA for Africa – "We Are the World", 14–27 April 1985 (two weeks)

=== 1990s ===
- Bryan Adams – "(Everything I Do) I Do It for You", 27 July – 7 September 1991 (seven weeks)
- Boyz II Men – "End of the Road", 31 October – 7 November 1992 (two weeks)
- Whitney Houston – "I Will Always Love You", 29 November 1992 – 12 February 1993 (ten weeks)
- Meat Loaf – "I'd Do Anything for Love (But I Won't Do That)", 6 November – 4 December 1993 (five weeks)
- Hanson – "MMMBop", 7 June 1997 (one week)
- Puff Daddy and Faith Evans featuring 112 – "I'll Be Missing You", 28 June – 12 July, 26 July – 9 August 1997 (six weeks)
- Elton John – "Something About the Way You Look Tonight" / "Candle in the Wind 1997", 11–18 October 1997 (two weeks)

=== 2000s ===
- Destiny's Child – Independent Women Part 1, 2 December 2000 (one week)
- Christina Aguilera/Lil' Kim/Mýa/Pink – "Lady Marmalade", 30 June 2001 (one week)
- Nelly featuring Kelly Rowland – "Dilemma", 26 October – 2 November 2002 (two weeks)
- Eminem – "Lose Yourself", 14 December 2002 (one week)
- Beyoncé featuring Jay-Z – "Crazy in Love", 12–26 July 2003 (three weeks)
- Usher – "Yeah!", 27 March – 3 April 2004 (two weeks)
- Usher – "Burn", 17 July 2004 (one week)
- Justin Timberlake – "SexyBack", 9 September 2006 (one week)
- Rihanna featuring Jay-Z – "Umbrella", 9 June – 21 July 2007 (seven weeks)
- Coldplay – "Viva la Vida", 28 June 2008 (one week)
- Katy Perry – "I Kissed a Girl", 16 August 2008 (one week)
- Lady Gaga featuring Colby O'Donis – "Just Dance", 17–31 January 2009 (three weeks)
- Flo Rida featuring Kesha – "Right Round", 14 March 2009 (one week)
- Lady Gaga – "Poker Face", 11 April 2009 (one week)
- Black Eyed Peas – "Boom Boom Pow", 23 May, 13 June 2009 (two weeks)
- Black Eyed Peas – "I Gotta Feeling", 8, 22 August 2009 (two weeks)

=== 2010s ===
- Katy Perry featuring Snoop Dogg – "California Gurls", 3–10 July 2010 (two weeks)
- Bruno Mars – "Just the Way You Are", 2 October 2010 (one week)
- Bruno Mars – "Grenade", 22 January 2011 (one week)
- Rihanna featuring Calvin Harris – "We Found Love", 19 November – 3 December 2011 (three weeks)
- Macklemore & Ryan Lewis featuring Wanz – "Thrift Shop", 16 February 2013 (one week)
- Robin Thicke featuring T.I. and Pharrell Williams – "Blurred Lines", 22–29 June, 20 July 2013 (three weeks)
- Katy Perry – "Roar", 14 – 21 September 2013 (two weeks)
- Lorde – "Royals", 2 November 2013 (one week)
- Pharrell Williams – "Happy", 8 March 2014 (one week)
- Magic! – "Rude", 9 August 2014 (one week)
- Meghan Trainor – "All About That Bass", 11 October – 1 November 2014 (four weeks)
- Mark Ronson featuring Bruno Mars – "Uptown Funk", 17 January – 7 February 2015 (four weeks)
- Wiz Khalifa featuring Charlie Puth – "See You Again", 25 April – 2 May 2015 (two weeks)
- Adele – "Hello", 14–21 November 2015 (two weeks)
- Drake featuring Wizkid and Kyla – "One Dance", 21 May, 4 June – 23 July 2016 (nine weeks)
- The Chainsmokers featuring Halsey – "Closer", 3–24 September 2016 (four weeks)
- Ed Sheeran – "Shape of You", 28 January, 18 February – 15 April, 29 April 2017 (eleven weeks)
- Luis Fonsi and Daddy Yankee featuring Justin Bieber – "Despacito", 27 May – 24 June, 8–22 July, 5–12 August 2017 (ten weeks)
- Taylor Swift – "Look What You Made Me Do", 16 September 2017 (one week)
- Ed Sheeran – "Perfect", 23 December 2017 – 13 January 2018 (five weeks)
- Drake – "God's Plan", 3 February – 31 March 2018 (nine weeks)
- Drake – "In My Feelings", 28 July – 18 August 2018 (four weeks)
- Ariana Grande – "Thank U, Next", 17 November – 1 December, 15–22 December 2018 (five weeks)
- Ariana Grande – "7 Rings", 2–16 February, 2 March 2019 (four weeks)

=== 2020s ===
- The Weeknd – "Blinding Lights", 11 April, 25 April 2020 (two weeks)
- Lady Gaga and Ariana Grande – "Rain on Me", 6 June 2020 (one week)
- DaBaby featuring Roddy Ricch – "Rockstar", 13–20 June, 4 July 2020 (three weeks)
- Cardi B featuring Megan Thee Stallion – "WAP", 19–26 September 2020 (two weeks)
- Ariana Grande – "Positions", 7 November 2020 (one week)
- Mariah Carey – "All I Want for Christmas is You", 19 December 2020 (one week)
- Olivia Rodrigo – "Drivers License", 23 January – 13 March 2021 (eight weeks)
- Adele – "Easy on Me", 30 October-20 November,15 January-21 January 2022 (Six weeks)
- Carolina Gaitán, Mauro Castillo, Adassa, Rhenzy Feliz,
  Diane Guerrero, Stephanie Beatriz and the Encanto cast – "We Don't Talk About Bruno", 5 February 2022 – 26 February 2022 (five weeks)
- Harry Styles – "As It Was", 15 April 2022 (five weeks)
- Taylor Swift – "Anti-Hero", 28 October 2022 – 18 Nov 2022 (four weeks)
- Beyoncé – "Texas Hold 'Em", 26 February 2024 (two weeks)

=== Simultaneous artists with different songs ===
The following artists have achieved simultaneous weeks at number one in both charts but with different songs.

- ABBA, 9 April 1977 – "Knowing Me, Knowing You" in the UK and "Dancing Queen" in the US (one week)
- John Lennon, 10 – 24 January 1981 – "Imagine" in the UK and "(Just Like) Starting Over" in the US (three weeks)
- Phil Collins, 30 March – 6 April 1985 – "Easy Lover" (with Philip Bailey) in the UK and "One More Night" in the US (two weeks)
- Tiffany, 6–13 February 1988 – "I Think We're Alone Now" in the UK and "Could've Been" in the US (two weeks)
- Spice Girls, 15 March 1997 – "Mama" / "Who Do You Think You Are" in the UK and "Wannabe" in the US (one week)
- Ariana Grande, 23 February 2019 – "Break Up with Your Girlfriend, I'm Bored" in the UK and "7 Rings" in the US (one week)

== Simultaneous number-one albums ==
=== 1950s ===
- The King and I cast – The King and I, 6 October 1956 (one week)
- Nat King Cole – Love Is the Thing, 2 June 1957 (one week)
- Elvis Presley – Loving You, 1–8 September 1957 (two weeks)
- South Pacific cast – South Pacific, 23 November 1958, 26 May – 16 June 1959, 14 July 1959, 28 July 1959 – 5 January 1960 (twenty-six weeks)

=== 1960s ===
- Elvis Presley – G.I. Blues, 8–22 January, 9 April, 21 May – 4 June 1961 (seven weeks)
- Elvis Presley – Blue Hawaii, 31 December 1961, 18 February – 29 April 1962 (twelve weeks)
- West Side Story cast – West Side Story, 17 June – 15 July, 26 August, 9 September, 23 September – 7 October, 11 November, 9 December 1962, 6 January 1963 (thirteen weeks)
- The Beatles – A Hard Day's Night, 26 July – 25 October 1964 (fourteen weeks)
- The Beatles – Help!, 12 September – 3 October 1965 (four weeks)
- The Sound of Music cast – The Sound of Music, 14–21 November 1965 (two weeks)
- The Beatles – Rubber Soul, 9 January – 6 February 1966 (five weeks)
- The Beatles – Revolver, 11–18 September 1966 (two weeks)
- The Monkees – The Monkees, 29 January – 5 February 1967 (two weeks)
- The Monkees – More of The Monkees, 7, 21 May 1967 (two weeks)
- The Beatles – Sgt. Pepper's Lonely Hearts Club Band, 2 July – 8 October 1967 (fifteen weeks)
- The Beatles – The Beatles, 29 December 1968 – 12 January, 26 January 1969 (four weeks)
- Blind Faith – Blind Faith, 21 September 1969 (one week)
- The Beatles – Abbey Road, 2 November – 7 December 1969, 3–10, 24 January 1970 (nine weeks)

=== 1970s ===
- Led Zeppelin – Led Zeppelin II, 7 February 1970 (one week)
- Simon and Garfunkel – Bridge Over Troubled Water, 7 March – 9 May 1970 (ten weeks)
- Led Zeppelin – Led Zeppelin III, 7–21 November 1970 (three weeks)
- George Harrison – All Things Must Pass, 6–13 February 1971 (two weeks)
- The Rolling Stones – Sticky Fingers, 22–29 May 1971 (two weeks)
- Rod Stewart – Every Picture Tells a Story, 2–23 October 1971 (four weeks)
- John Lennon – Imagine, 30 October 1971 (one week)
- Neil Young – Harvest, 11 March 1972 (one week)
- Elton John – Don't Shoot Me I'm Only the Piano Player, 3–10 March 1973 (two weeks)
- Elton John – Goodbye Yellow Brick Road, 22–29 December 1973 (two weeks)
- Elton John – Caribou, 13–20 July 1974 (two weeks)
- Elton John – Greatest Hits, 30 November 1974 – 1 February 1975 (ten weeks)
- Wings – Venus and Mars, 19 July 1975 (one week)
- Pink Floyd – Wish You Were Here, 4 October 1975 (one week)
- Bee Gees/Various Artists – Saturday Night Fever, 6 May – 1 July 1978 (nine weeks)
- John Travolta and Olivia Newton-John/Grease cast – Grease: The Original Soundtrack from the Motion Picture, 14–28 October 1978 (three weeks)
- Bee Gees – Spirits Having Flown, 17–24 March 1979 (two weeks)
- Led Zeppelin – In Through The Out Door, 15 September 1979 (one week)

=== 1980s ===
- John Lennon and Yoko Ono – Double Fantasy, 7–14 February 1981 (two weeks)
- Men at Work – Business as Usual, 29 January – 19 February 1983 (four weeks)
- Michael Jackson – Thriller, 5, 19 March, 21 May – 18 June 1983, 28 January 1984 (eight weeks)
- Phil Collins – No Jacket Required, 30 March 1985 (one week)
- Madonna – True Blue, 16 August 1986 (one week)
- Whitney Houston – Whitney, 27 June – 18 July 1987 (four weeks)
- Michael Jackson – Bad, 26 September – 10 October 1987 (three weeks)

=== 1990s ===
- Phil Collins – ...But Seriously, 6 January 1990, 20–27 January 1990 (three weeks)
- Depeche Mode – Songs of Faith and Devotion, 3 April 1993 (one week)
- Meat Loaf – Bat Out of Hell II: Back into Hell, 30 October 1993 (one week)
- Mariah Carey – Music Box, 5–12 March 1994 (two weeks)
- Pink Floyd – The Division Bell, 23 – 30 April 1994 (two weeks)
- R.E.M. – Monster, 15 October 1994 (one week)
- Alanis Morissette – Jagged Little Pill, 24 August – 7 September 1996 (three weeks)
- The Prodigy – The Fat of the Land, 26 July 1997 (one week)
- James Horner – Titanic, 15 February – 8 March 1998 (three weeks)

=== 2000s ===
- Eminem – The Marshall Mathers LP, 25 June, 9 July 2000 (two weeks)
- Radiohead – Kid A 2 October 2000 (one week)
- Limp Bizkit - Chocolate Starfish and the Hot Dog Flavored Water 17 October 2000 (one week)
- The Beatles – 1, 2, 23 December 2000 – 20 January 2001 (six weeks)
- Eminem – The Eminem Show, 8–29 June 2002 (four weeks)
- Beyoncé – Dangerously in Love, 12 July 2003 (one week)
- Eminem – Encore, 27 November 2004 (one week)
- Coldplay – X&Y, 25 June – 9 July 2005 (three weeks)
- Eminem – Curtain Call: The Hits, 24–31 December 2005 (two weeks)
- Coldplay – Viva la Vida or Death and All His Friends, 5–12 July 2008 (two weeks)
- Metallica – Death Magnetic, 27 September 2008 (one week)
- Eminem – Relapse, 6 June 2009 (one week)
- Barbra Streisand – Love Is the Answer, 17 October 2009 (one week)
- Susan Boyle – I Dreamed a Dream, 12 December 2009 – 2 January 2010 (four weeks)

=== 2010s ===
- Eminem – Recovery, 10–17 July, 24 July – 14 August, 4–11 September 2010 (eight weeks)
- Katy Perry – Teenage Dream, 11 September 2010 (one week)
- Adele – 21, 12–19 March, 7–28 May 2011 (six weeks)
- Beyoncé – 4, 16 July 2011 (one week)
- Coldplay – Mylo Xyloto, 12 November 2011 (one week)
- Madonna – MDNA, 7 April 2012 (one week)
- Nicki Minaj – Pink Friday: Roman Reloaded, 21 April 2012 (one week)
- Rihanna – Unapologetic, 1 December 2012 (one week)
- Paramore – Paramore, 20 April 2013 (one week)
- Katy Perry – Prism, 2 November 2013 (one week)
- Coldplay – Ghost Stories, 7 June 2014 (one week)
- Ed Sheeran – x, 12 July 2014 (one week)
- Muse - Drones, 17 June 2015 (one week)
- David Bowie – Blackstar, 30 January 2016 (one week)
- The 1975 – I Like It When You Sleep, for You Are So Beautiful yet So Unaware of It, 27 February 2016 (one week)
- Zayn – Mind of Mine, 1 April 2016 (one week)
- Beyoncé – Lemonade, 14 May 2016 (one week)
- Drake – Views, 21 May 2016 (two weeks)
- Ed Sheeran – ÷, 25 March 2017 (two weeks)
- Harry Styles – Harry Styles, May 2017 (one week)
- Taylor Swift – Reputation, 21 November 2017 (one week)
- Various Artists – The Greatest Showman: Original Motion Picture Soundtrack, 12 January 2018 (one week)
- Drake – Scorpion, 13 July 2018 (one week)
- Ariana Grande – Sweetener, 1 September 2018 (one week)
- Eminem – Kamikaze, 15 September 2018 (one week)
- Lady Gaga and Bradley Cooper – A Star Is Born, 15 October 2018 (one week)
- Andrea Bocelli – Sì, 10 November 2018 (one week)
- Ariana Grande – Thank U, Next, 23 February – 2 March 2019 (two weeks)
- BTS – Map of the Soul: Persona, 12–19 April 2019 (one week)

=== 2020s ===
- BTS – Map of the Soul: 7, 28 February 2020 (one week)
- Lady Gaga – Chromatica, 5 June 2020 (one week)
- Taylor Swift – Folklore, 31 July 2020 – 14 August 2020 (three weeks)
- Ariana Grande – Positions, 6 November 2020 (one week)
- Taylor Swift – Evermore, 16 December 2020 – 23 December 2020 (one week)
- Beyoncé – Renaissance, 4 August 2022 (one week)
- Blackpink – Born Pink, 23 September 2022 (one week)
- Taylor Swift – Midnights, 28 October – 4 November 2022 (two weeks)
- Coldplay – Moon Music, 16 October 2024 (one week)
- Sleep Token - Even in Arcadia, 9 May 2025 (one week)
- My Chemical Romance - The Black Parade, 23 October 2026 (one week)

=== Simultaneous artists with different albums ===
As of 2023, only the Beatles have achieved number ones on the same week but with different albums.

- 16 February – 19 April 1964. With the Beatles in the UK and Meet the Beatles! in the US (ten weeks)
- 10–24 January, 21 February 1965. Beatles for Sale in the UK and Beatles '65 in the US (four weeks)
- 8–15 August 1965. Help! in the UK and Beatles VI in the US (two weeks)
- 7–28 August 1966. Revolver in the UK and Yesterday and Today in the US (four weeks)
- 28 January 1968. Sgt. Pepper's Lonely Hearts Club Band in the UK and Magical Mystery Tour in the US (one week)

== See also ==
- List of Billboard number-one singles
- List of artists who reached number one in the United States
- List of artists who have achieved Japan and U.S. number-one hits
