= I Want to Be Free (Elvis Presley song) =

Single by Elvis Presley

from the album Jailhouse Rock (EP)
- Released: 1957
- Recorded: May 3, 1957
- Length: 2:12
- Songwriter(s): Jerry Leiber and Mike Stoller

"I Want to Be Free" is a song first recorded by Elvis Presley as part of the soundtrack for his 1957 motion picture Jailhouse Rock. Its first release on record was on the soundtrack EP Jailhouse Rock in 1957.

In some countries in 1958 the song was released on a single as the reverse side to "(You're So Square) Baby I Don't Care".

== Writing ==
The song was written by Jerry Leiber and Mike Stoller specially for Presley's 1957 film Jailhouse Rock. They wrote several famous songs: "Jailhouse Rock", "(You're So Square) Baby I Don't Care", "Treat Me Nice" and "I Want to Be Free" in one afternoon.

Jerry Leiber recalled:

In the spring of 1957, we were summoned to New York in order to discuss and write the score for a new Presley film. We had been in New York for about a week but had not settled down to write anything for the new film, New York was just too exciting. We were about to leave the hotel room for another assault on Manhattan, when Jean Aberbach of Presley Music barged in. He pushed a large sofa in front of the door, blocking the entrance, and with that informed us that we were not leaving the room until we had finished the score and placed it in his hands. Mike and I struggled and went to the rented upright piano in the corner of the room and while Jean pretended to doze on the couch, we hammered out "Jailhouse Rock", "Treat Me Nice", "I Want to Be Free" and "Baby I Don't Care". We started writing at about 2:00 in the afternoon, and by 6:00 P.M. we were out in the streets again.

== Recording ==
Presley recorded "I Want to Be Free" on May 3, 1957, at the soundtrack recordings for the MGM movie Jailhouse Rock (that took place on April 30 and May 3, 1957, at the Radio Recorders Studio and on May 9 at the MGM Soundstage in Hollywood, California).

== Track listing ==
7" single (1958)

1. "(You're So Square) Baby I Don't Care"
2. "I Want to Be Free"
