= Jailhouse Rock (song) =

Single by Elvis Presley

from the EP Jailhouse Rock
- B-side: "Treat Me Nice"
- Released: September 24, 1957
- Recorded: April 30, 1957
- Studio: Radio Recorders, Los Angeles
- Genre: Rock and roll
- Length: 2:35
- Label: RCA Victor
- Songwriter: Jerry Leiber and Mike Stoller
- Producer: Jeff Alexander

Elvis Presley singles chronology
"(Let Me Be Your) Teddy Bear" (1957)	"Jailhouse Rock" (1957)	"Don't" (1958)

Music video
- "Jailhouse Rock" (audio) on YouTube

Audio sample
- Jailhouse Rock: file; help

"Jailhouse Rock" is a rock and roll song recorded by American singer Elvis Presley for the film of the same name. It was written by Jerry Leiber and Mike Stoller. RCA Victor released the song on a 45 rpm single on September 24, 1957, and as a 78 rpm single in the UK, as the first single from the film's soundtrack EP. It reached the top of the charts in the U.S. and the top 10 in several other countries. The song has been recognized by the Grammy Hall of Fame, the American Film Institute, and others.

== Characters and themes ==
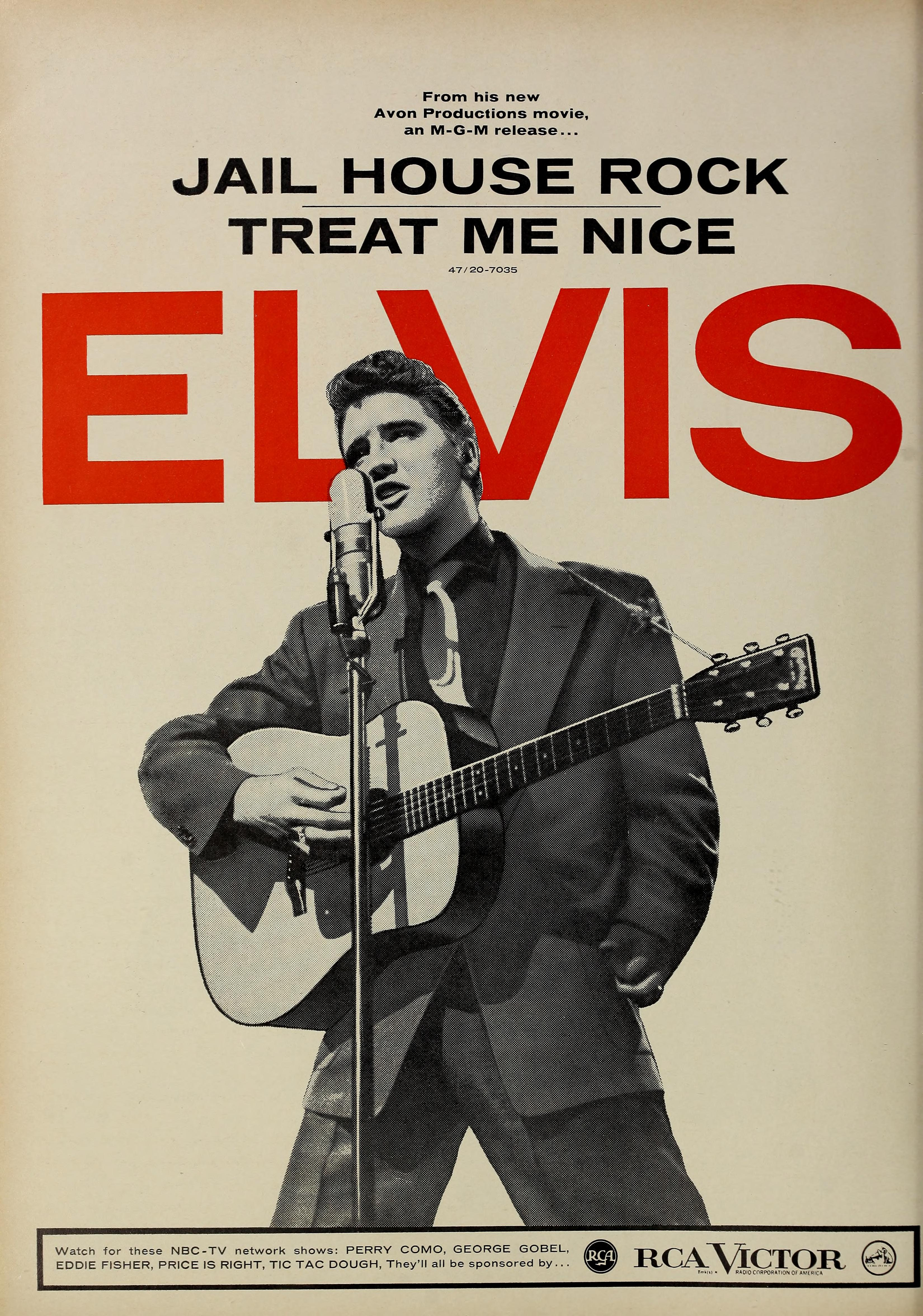
Cashbox advertisement, October 5, 1957

Some of the characters named in the song are real people. Shifty Henry was a well-known Los Angeles musician, not a criminal. The Purple Gang was a real mob. "Sad Sack" was a U.S. Army nickname in World War II for a loser, which was also the name of a popular comic strip and comic book character.

According to Rolling Stone, Jerry Leiber and Mike Stoller's "theme song for Presley's third movie was decidedly silly, the kind of tongue-in-cheek goof they had come up with for The Coasters. Presley, however, sang it as straight rock & roll, overlooking the jokes in the lyrics (like the suggestion of gay romance when inmate Number 47 tells Number 3, 'You're the cutest jailbird I ever did see') and then introducing Scotty Moore's guitar solo with a cry so intense that the take almost collapses." Gender studies scholars cite the song for "its famous reference to homoerotics behind bars", while music critic Garry Mulholland writes, "'Jailhouse Rock' was always a queer lyric, in both senses." Douglas Brode writes of the filmed production number that it's "amazing that the sequence passed by the censors".

== Releases and chart performance ==
The single, with its B-side "Treat Me Nice" (another song from the film's soundtrack) was a US number one hit on the Billboard Hot 100 for seven weeks in the fall of 1957, and a UK number one hit for three weeks early in 1958. In addition, "Jailhouse Rock" spent one week at the top of the US country charts, and reached the number one position on the R&B charts.

Also in 1957, "Jailhouse Rock" was the lead song in an EP (extended play single) titled Jailhouse Rock, together with other songs from the film, namely "Young and Beautiful", "I Want to Be Free", "Don't Leave Me Now" and "(You're So Square) Baby I Don't Care" (but with "Treat Me Nice" omitted). It topped the Billboard EP charts, ultimately selling two million copies and earning a double-platinum RIAA certification.

== Personnel ==
Credits sourced from AFM union contracts and label records.

The Blue Moon Boys

- Elvis Presley – lead vocals; acoustic rhythm guitar (uncertain)
- Scotty Moore – electric lead guitar
- Bill Black – electric bass
- D. J. Fontana – drums

The Jordanaires

- Gordon Stoker – backing vocals
- Hoyt Hawkins – backing vocals
- Neal Matthews – backing vocals, double bass
- Hugh Jarrett – backing vocals

Additional musician and production staff

- Dudley Brooks – piano
- Jeff Alexander – producer
- Thorne Nogar – engineer

== Legacy ==
Rolling Stone magazine included "Jailhouse Rock" at number 67 on its list of The 500 Greatest Songs of All Time and it was named one of the Rock and Roll Hall of Fame's 500 Songs that Shaped Rock and Roll. In 2004, it finished at number 21 on AFI's 100 Years...100 Songs survey of top tunes in American cinema. On November 27, 2016, the Grammy Hall of Fame announced its induction, along with that of another 24 songs. In 2019, the song ranked number 31 on Spanish radio station Rock FM 500's list of "Five Hundred Rockers of All Time", ahead of any other song of the 1950s. By 2006, numerous scholars would accept that the song's line about prisoner "number 47" being attracted to prisoner "number 3" was a reference to homoeroticism.

== Charts ==
=== Weekly charts ===
Chart (1957–1958)	Peak position
Australia (Kent Music Report)	3
Belgium (Ultratop 50 Flanders)	8
Finland (Suomen virallinen lista)	7
South Africa (Springbok)	1
UK Singles (Official Charts)	1
US Billboard Hot 100	1
US Billboard Best Sellers in Stores	1
US Billboard Most Played by Jockeys	1
US Billboard Most Played Country & Western Singles	3
US Billboard Most Played Rhythm and Blues Singles	1
US Billboard Top Selling Country & Western Singles	1
US Billboard Top Selling Rhythm and Blues Singles	1
US Cash Box Magazine Top Country & Western Singles	1

Chart (1971)	Peak position
UK Singles (Official Charts)	42

Chart (1974)	Peak position
Belgium (Ultratop 50 Wallonia)	9
Netherlands (Single Top 100)	4

Chart (1977)	Peak position
UK Singles (Official Charts)	44

Chart (2005)	Peak position
Ireland (IRMA)	23
France (SNEP)	87
Netherlands (Single Top 100)	19
Scotland Singles (Official Charts)	1
Sweden (Sverigetopplistan)	37
Switzerland (Schweizer Hitparade)	96
UK Singles (Official Charts)	1

=== Year-end charts ===
Chart (1957)	Position
Australia (Kent Music Report)	22
US Billboard (Best Sellers in Stores)	16
US Singles (Cash Box)	11
Chart (1958)	Position
South Africa (Springbok)	11
Chart (2005)	Position
UK Singles (Official Charts Company)	134

== Certifications ==
Region	Certification	Certified units/sales
Denmark (IFPI Danmark)	Gold	45,000^{‡}
Germany (BVMI)	Gold	300,000^{‡}
Italy (FIMI)	Gold	35,000^{‡}
New Zealand (RMNZ)	Platinum	30,000^{‡}
Spain (Promusicae)	Gold	30,000^{‡}
United Kingdom (BPI)	Platinum	600,000^{‡}
United States (RIAA)	2× Platinum	2,000,000^{^}
^{^} Shipments figures based on certification alone.^{‡} Sales+streaming figures based on certification alone.

== See also ==
- List of Top 25 singles for 1957 in Australia
- List of Billboard number-one rhythm and blues hits
- List of Billboard number-one singles of 1957
- Billboard year-end top 50 singles of 1957
- List of Cash Box Best Sellers number-one singles of 1957
- List of CHUM number-one singles of 1957
- List of number-one country singles of 1957 (U.S.)
- List of UK Singles Chart number ones of the 1950s
- List of UK Singles Chart number ones of the 2000s
