= Jailhouse Rock (EP) =

EP (soundtrack) by Elvis Presley
- Released: October 30, 1957
- Recorded: April 30, May 3 & 9, 1957
- Studio: Radio Recorders (Hollywood)
- Genres: Rock and roll; rockabilly; pop
- Length: 10:36
- Label: RCA Victor
- Producer: Jeff Alexander

Elvis Presley chronology
Elvis' Christmas Album (1957)	Jailhouse Rock (1957)	Elvis' Golden Records (1958)

1997 CD Reissue Cover

Singles from Jailhouse Rock
- 1. "Jailhouse Rock" Released: September 24, 1957; 2. "Young and Beautiful" Released: February 21, 1959

"Jailhouse Rock"
Elvis Presley's "Jailhouse Rock" from Jailhouse Rock

Jailhouse Rock is an EP by American singer Elvis Presley, featuring songs from the movie of the same name. It was released by RCA Victor, with catalogue EPA 4114, on October 30, 1957. Recording sessions took place at Radio Recorders in Hollywood on April 30 and May 3, 1957, with an additional session at the Metro-Goldwyn-Mayer Soundstage in Hollywood on May 9 for "Don't Leave Me Now". It peaked at #1 on the newly inaugurated Billboard EP chart where it remained at #1 for 28 weeks. The EP album was the best selling EP album of 1958 according to Billboard.

== Content ==
Unlike Loving You (1957) but like Love Me Tender (1956), a full long-playing album soundtrack was not devised for Jailhouse Rock. The title song "Jailhouse Rock" had already been released as a single on September 24, 1957, and went to #1 on the singles chart. The sixth soundtrack song "Treat Me Nice" was not included on the EP, a new recording from September 5 at Radio Recorders was instead placed as the B-side to the "Jailhouse Rock" single where it peaked at #18 on the singles chart independently. The writing and production team of Jerry Leiber and Mike Stoller played prominent roles in the making of the soundtrack, writing four of its songs and working closely with Presley in the studio. Other than both sides of the single and "I Want to Be Free", the fourth song by the pair "(You're So Square) Baby I Don't Care" became a minor standard, receiving cover versions by Buddy Holly, Cliff Richard, Joni Mitchell, and Brian Setzer.

"Don't Leave Me Now" had also appeared on the Loving You (1957) album, but in a different version from an earlier set of recording sessions. Additional original music for the film was composed by producer Jeff Alexander, and the song sung by the Hunk Houghton character, "One Day", was by Roy C. Bennett and Sid Tepper.

== Reissues ==
All five songs from the EP are available on The King of Rock 'n' Roll: The Complete 50s Masters released in 1992. On April 15, 1997, RCA released a compact disc comprising versions appearing in the feature film and versions that had been commercially released on records of the songs from both Jailhouse Rock and Presley's first movie, Love Me Tender. Three tracks were previously unreleased alternate takes, along with two newly mixed stereo versions of "Love Me Tender" and "Poor Boy".

== Track listing ==
=== Original release ===
Side one
No.	Title	Writer(s)	Recording date	Length
1.	"Jailhouse Rock"	Jerry Leiber and Mike Stoller	April 30, 1957	2:35
2.	"Young and Beautiful"	Aaron Schroeder and Abner Silver	April 30, 1957	2:02

Side two
No.	Title	Writer(s)	Recording date	Length
1.	"I Want to Be Free"	Jerry Leiber and Mike Stoller	May 3, 1957	2:12
2.	"Don't Leave Me Now" (movie version)	Aaron Schroeder and Ben Weisman	May 9, 1957	2:05
3.	"(You're So Square) Baby I Don't Care"	Jerry Leiber and Mike Stoller	May 3, 1957	1:51

=== 1997 Compact disc reissue with bonus tracks, including the songs from the Love Me Tender soundtrack ===
No.	Title	Writer(s)	Recording date	Length
1.	"Jailhouse Rock"	Jerry Leiber and Mike Stoller	April 30, 1957	2:35
2.	"Treat Me Nice"	Jerry Leiber and Mike Stoller	September 5, 1957	2:10
3.	"I Want to Be Free"	Jerry Leiber and Mike Stoller	May 3, 1957	2:12
4.	"Don't Leave Me Now"	Aaron Schroeder and Ben Weisman	May 9, 1957	2:05
5.	"Young and Beautiful"	Aaron Schroeder and Abner Silver	April 30, 1957	2:02
6.	"(You're So Square) Baby I Don't Care"	Jerry Leiber and Mike Stoller	May 3, 1957	1:51
7.	"Jailhouse Rock" (film version)	Jerry Leiber and Mike Stoller	April 30, 1957	2:32
8.	"Treat Me Nice" (film version)	Jerry Leiber and Mike Stoller	May 3, 1957	1:59
9.	"I Want to Be Free" (film version)	Jerry Leiber and Mike Stoller	May 3, 1957	2:06
10.	"Young and Beautiful" (film version)	Aaron Schroeder and Abner Silver	April 30, 1957	1:09
11.	"Don't Leave Me Now" (previously unreleased alternate take)	Aaron Schroeder and Ben Weisman	May 3, 1957	1:45
12.	"Love Me Tender"	Vera Matson and Elvis Presley	August 24, 1956	2:41
13.	"Poor Boy"	Vera Matson and Elvis Presley	August 24, 1956	2:13
14.	"Let Me"	Vera Matson and Elvis Presley	September 4, 1956	2:09
15.	"We're Gonna Move"	Vera Matson and Elvis Presley	August 24, 1956	2:30
16.	"Love Me Tender" (end title version)	Vera Matson and Elvis Presley	October 1, 1956	1:08
17.	"Let Me" (previously unreleased alternate take)	Vera Matson and Elvis Presley	September 4, 1956	2:04
18.	"We're Gonna Move" (previously unreleased alternate take)	Vera Matson and Elvis Presley	August 24, 1956	2:39
19.	"Poor Boy" (previously unreleased stereo version)	Vera Matson and Elvis Presley	August 24, 1956	2:42
20.	"Love Me Tender" (previously unreleased stereo version)	Vera Matson and Elvis Presley	August 24, 1956	2:42

== Personnel ==
The Blue Moon Boys

- Elvis Presley – vocals, acoustic rhythm guitar, electric bass on "(You're So Square) Baby I Don't Care"
- Scotty Moore – electric lead guitar
- Bill Black – double bass, electric bass
- D. J. Fontana – drums

The Jordanaires

- Gordon Stoker – backing vocals
- Neal Matthews – backing vocals, double bass (uncertain)
- Hoyt Hawkins – backing vocals
- Hugh Jarrett – backing vocals

Additional musicians and production staff

- Dudley Brooks – piano
- Mike Stoller – piano on "I Want to Be Free", production assistance
- Jeffrey Alexander - producer
- Jerry Leiber - production assistance
- Thorne Nogar - engineer ("Jailhouse Rock", "Young and Beautiful", "(You're So Square) Baby I Don't Care", "I Want to Be Free")
- Fred Mulculpin - engineer ("Don't Leave Me Now")
