= List of UK Albums Chart number ones of the 1950s =

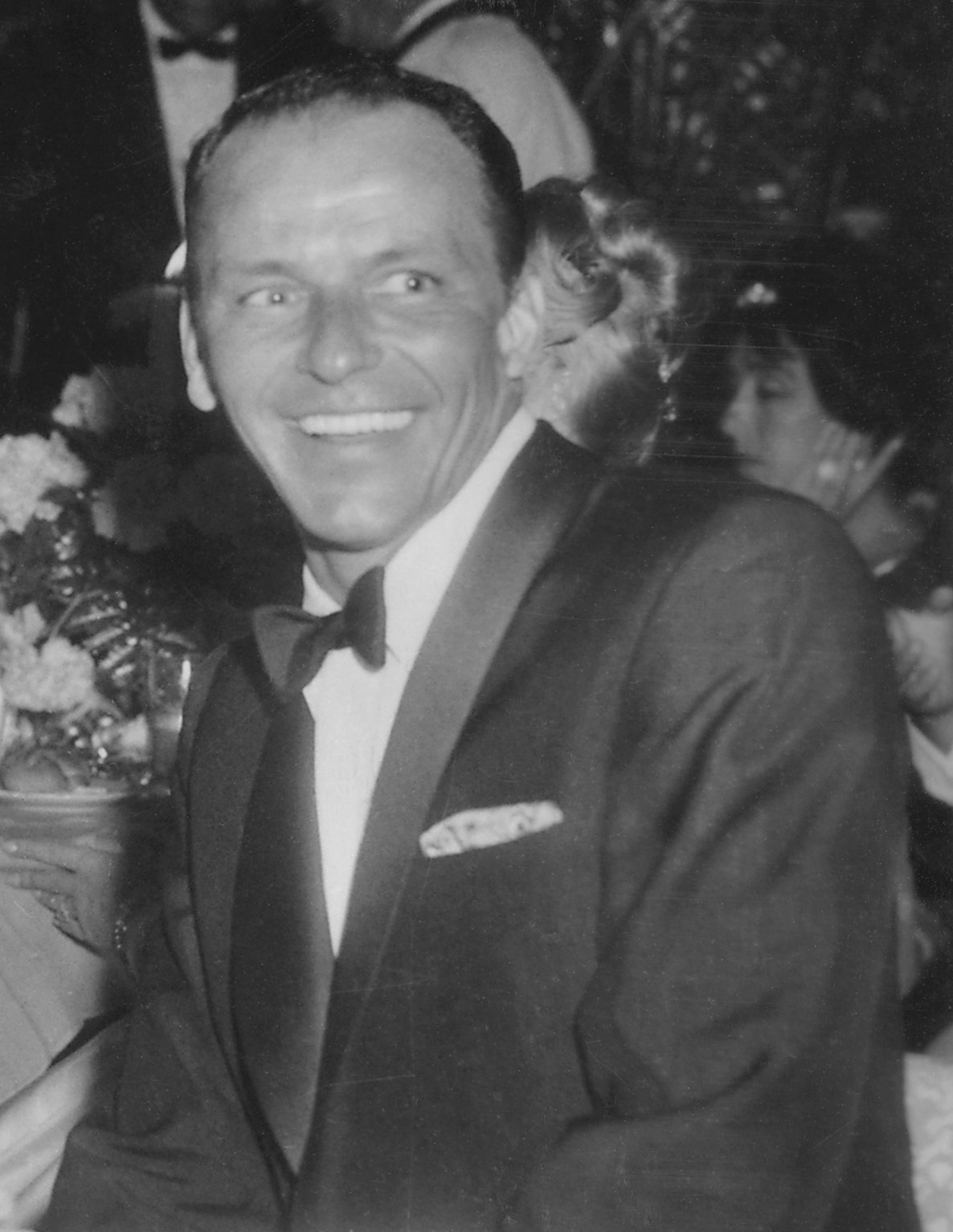
Frank Sinatra spent 14 weeks at the top of the UK Album Chart during the 1950s, longer than any other artist.

The UK Albums Chart is a record chart based on weekly album sales; during the 1950s, a total of 17 different albums reached number one. The longest run at number one was the original soundtrack of the movie South Pacific, which held on to the top spot for 60 consecutive weeks in the 1950s, and went on to attain another 55 weeks in 1960 and 1961, totalling a record of 115 weeks at number-one in the UK. It was number-one for the entire year in 1959.

The UK Albums Chart canon was modified when chart fans Alan Smith and Keith Badman discovered that charts of albums in the UK dated back to 28 July 1956, not 8 November 1958 as previously thought. The first album chart was a Top 5 published in Record Mirror. The album at number one on this chart was Songs for Swingin' Lovers! by Frank Sinatra. From 8 November 1958, a Top 10 album chart was compiled by Melody Maker. Although the Record Mirror chart continued to run after this date, Melody Maker is taken as the canonical source as it had a larger sample. In 1959, from June to August a newspaper strike prevented the album chart from being published and the previous chart was duplicated in these weeks. Nevertheless, the South Pacific soundtrack was number one for the entire duration of 1959.

== Number ones ==
Key
No.	nth album to top the UK Albums Chart
re	Return of an album to number one
†	Best-selling album of the year
‡	The album spent a week at number one where it shared the top spot with another album

No.	Artist (Note: The artist, album, date of reaching number one and number of weeks at number one are those given by Official Charts Company.)	Album	Record label (Note: The record labels are those given by the OCC.)	Reached number one	Weeks at number one
1956
1	Frank Sinatra	Songs for Swingin' Lovers!	Capitol	22 July 1956	2
2	Original soundtrack	Carousel †	Capitol	5 August 1956	2
re	Frank Sinatra	Songs for Swingin' Lovers!	Capitol	19 August 1956	1
re	Original soundtrack	Carousel †	Capitol	26 August 1956	4
3	Original soundtrack	Oklahoma!	Capitol	23 September 1956	2
4	Original soundtrack	The King and I	Capitol	7 October 1956	2
5	Bill Haley & His Comets	Rock 'n' Roll Stage Show	Brunswick	21 October 1956	1
re	Original soundtrack	The King and I	Capitol	28 October 1956	1
6	Elvis Presley	Rock 'N' Roll	His Master's Voice	4 November 1956	1
re	Original soundtrack	The King and I	Capitol	11 November 1956	15 ‡ (Note: Both Original soundtracks for The King and I and High Society were classified jointly as number one on 16 February 1957. In the weeks before and after The King and I held the number-one spot outright.)
1957
7	Original soundtrack	High Society	Capitol	10 February 1957	1 ‡
8	Frank Sinatra	This Is Sinatra!	Capitol	24 February 1957	1
re	Original soundtrack	The King and I †	Capitol	3 March 1957	1
re	Frank Sinatra	This Is Sinatra!	Capitol	10 March 1957	1
re	Original soundtrack	The King and I †	Capitol	17 March 1957	1
re	Frank Sinatra	This Is Sinatra!	Capitol	24 March 1957	1
re	Original soundtrack	The King and I †	Capitol	31 March 1957	3
re	Frank Sinatra	This Is Sinatra!	Capitol	21 April 1957	1
re	Original soundtrack	The King and I †	Capitol	28 April 1957	6 ‡ (Note: Both the Original soundtrack for The King and I and Nat 'King' Cole's Love Is the Thing were classified jointly as number one on 8 June 1957. The King and I was in the number-one spot the previous week, and the following week the Oklahoma! soundtrack took the top spot.)
9	Nat 'King' Cole	Love Is the Thing	Capitol	2 June 1957	1 ‡
re	Original soundtrack	Oklahoma!	Capitol	9 June 1957	1
re	Original soundtrack	The King and I †	Capitol	16 June 1957	4
10	Tommy Steele	The Tommy Steele Story	Decca	14 July 1957	3
re	Original soundtrack	The King and I †	Capitol	4 August 1957	3
re	Tommy Steele	The Tommy Steele Story	Decca	25 August 1957	1
11	Elvis Presley	Loving You	RCA	1 September 1957	2
12	Frank Sinatra	A Swingin' Affair!	Capitol	15 September 1957	7
re	Elvis Presley	Loving You	RCA	3 November 1957	1
re	Original soundtrack	The King and I †	Capitol	10 November 1957	11
1958
13	Original soundtrack	Pal Joey	Capitol	25 January 1958	7
re	Original soundtrack	The King and I	Capitol	16 March 1958	1
re	Original soundtrack	Pal Joey	Capitol	23 March 1958	4
14	Original soundtrack	The Duke Wore Jeans	Decca	20 April 1958	2
15	Original cast	My Fair Lady †	Philips	4 May 1958	19
16	Elvis Presley	King Creole	RCA	14 September 1958	7
17	Original soundtrack	South Pacific	RCA Victor	2 November 1958	70
1959
No new number one – the original soundtrack to South Pacific remained at the top of the chart throughout 1959 † and into 1960 †

=== By artist ===
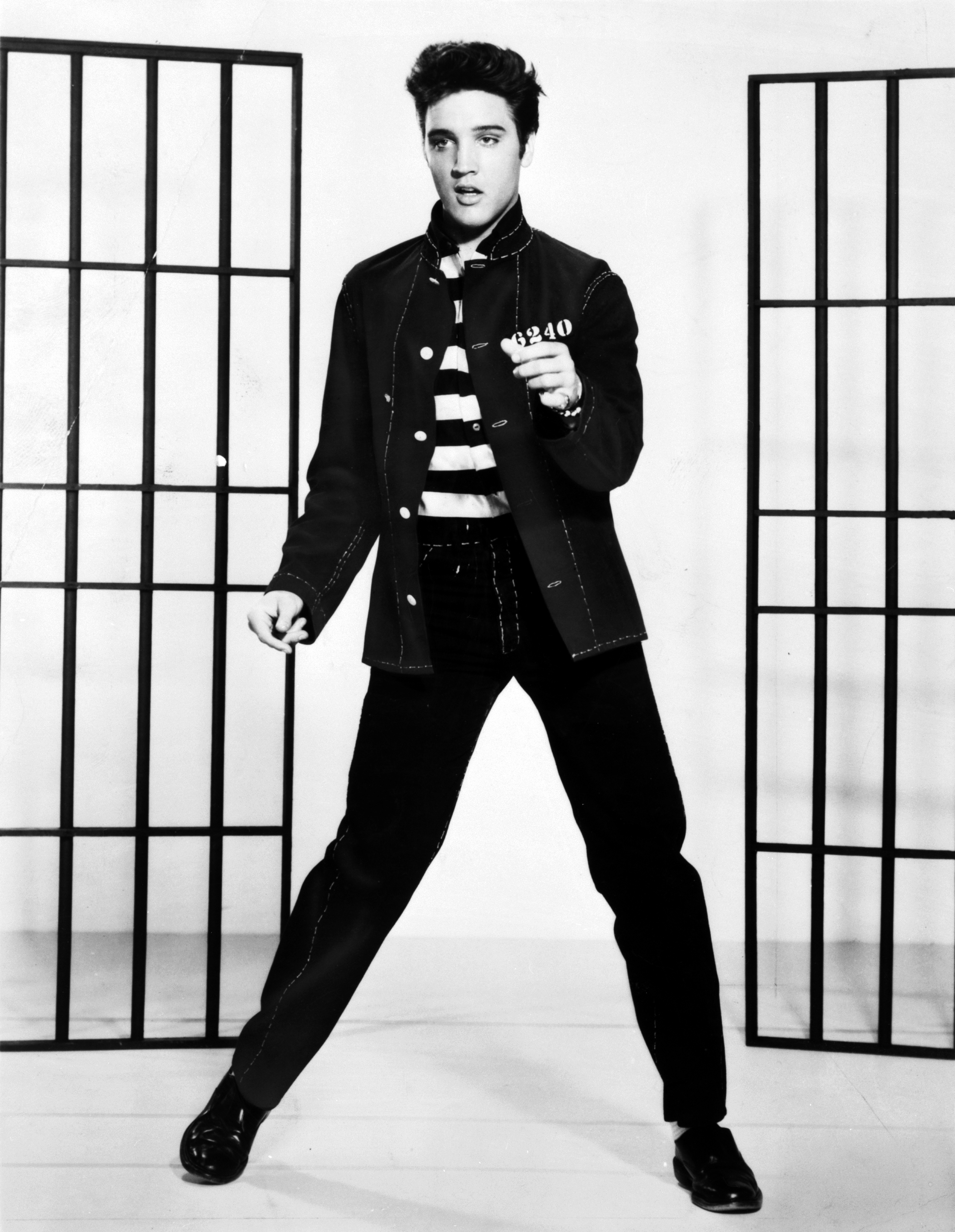
Elvis Presley topped the UK Albums Chart for 11 weeks during the 1950s.

Five artists topped the album chart during the 1950s. Original soundtracks and cast recordings are omitted.

Artist	Number ones	Weeks at number one	Albums
Frank Sinatra	3	14	• Songs for Swingin' Lovers! (1956, three weeks at number one) • This Is Sinatra! (1957, four weeks) • A Swingin' Affair! (1957, seven weeks)
Elvis Presley	3	11	• Rock 'N' Roll (1956, one week at number one) • Loving You (1957, three weeks) • King Creole (1958, seven weeks)
Tommy Steele	1	4	• The Tommy Steele Story (1957, four weeks at number one)
Nat 'King' Cole	1	1	• Love Is the Thing (1957, one week at number one)
Bill Haley & His Comets	1	1	• Rock 'n' Roll Stage Show (1957, one week at number one)

== Christmas number ones ==
In the UK, Christmas number-one albums are those that are at the top of the UK Albums Chart on Christmas Day. Typically, this will refer to the album that was announced as number one on the Sunday before 25 December—when Christmas Day falls on a Sunday itself, the official number one is considered by the OCC to be the one announced on that day's chart. During the 1950s, the following albums were Christmas number ones.

Year	Artist	Album	Record label	Weeks at number one
1956	Original soundtrack	The King and I	Capitol	48
1957	Original soundtrack	The King and I	Capitol	48
1958	Original soundtrack	South Pacific	RCA Victor	115
1959	Original soundtrack	South Pacific	RCA Victor	115

== Comparison to Record Mirror album chart ==
From 8 November 1958, Melody Maker is regarded as the canonical source. Record Mirror continued to compile an album chart with the following differences:

Dates	Melody Maker	Record Mirror
8 November – 27 December 1958	Original soundtrack – South Pacific (8 weeks)	Elvis Presley – King Creole (1 week); Original cast – My Fair Lady (4 weeks); Original soundtrack – South Pacific (3 weeks)
