= Young and Beautiful =

Young and Beautiful may refer to:

- "Young and Beautiful" (Elvis Presley song)
- "Young and Beautiful" (Lana Del Rey song)
- Young and Beautiful (film), a 1934 American film directed by Joseph Santley
- Young & Beautiful, a 2013 French film directed François Ozon
- The Young and Beautiful, a 1955 Broadway play based on the stories of F. Scott Fitzgerald
