= Gang War (1958 film) =

1958 film by Gene Fowler Jr.

- Theatrical release poster
- Directed by: Gene Fowler, Jr.
- Screenplay by: Louis Vittes
- Produced by: Harold E. Knox
- Starring: Charles Bronson; Kent Taylor; Jennifer Holden; John Doucette
- Cinematography: John M. Nickolaus, Jr.
- Edited by: Frank Baldridge
- Music by: Paul Dunlap
- Production company: Regal Films
- Distributed by: 20th Century Fox
- Release date: July 1958
- Running time: 74 minutes
- Country: United States
- Language: English

Gang War is a 1958 American crime film directed by Gene Fowler, Jr. and written by Louis Vittes. The film stars Charles Bronson, Kent Taylor, Jennifer Holden, John Doucette, Gloria Henry and Gloria Grey. The film was released in July 1958, by 20th Century Fox.

It was the second of two films Gene Fowler directed with Charles Bronson for Regal Films, the other being Showdown at Boot Hill. Writer Vittes and director Fowler later made The Oregon Trail for Regal.

== Plot ==
A Los Angeles high-school teacher's problems begin when he happens to witness a gangland killing and agrees to identify the murderers, not realizing this will cause the underworld to retaliate against him.

== Cast ==
- Charles Bronson as Alan Avery
- Kent Taylor as Bryce Barker
- Jennifer Holden as Marie
- John Doucette as Maxie Meadows
- Gloria Henry as Edie Avery
- Gloria Grey as Marsha
- Barney Phillips as Lieutenant Sam Johnson
- Ralph Manza as Bernard "Axe" Duncan, Reno Hood
- George Eldredge as Sergeant Ernie Tucker
- Billy Snyder as Mr. Tomkins
- Lyn Guild as Diane Barker
- Dan Simmons as Officer Bob Cross
- Jack Reynolds as Joe Reno
- Jack Littlefield as Johnny
- Larry Gelbman as Chester
- Shirley Haven as Nicki
- Ed Wright as 1st Henchman

== Production ==
Filming started 11 December 1957.
