= Jennifer Holden =

American actress (1936–2022)

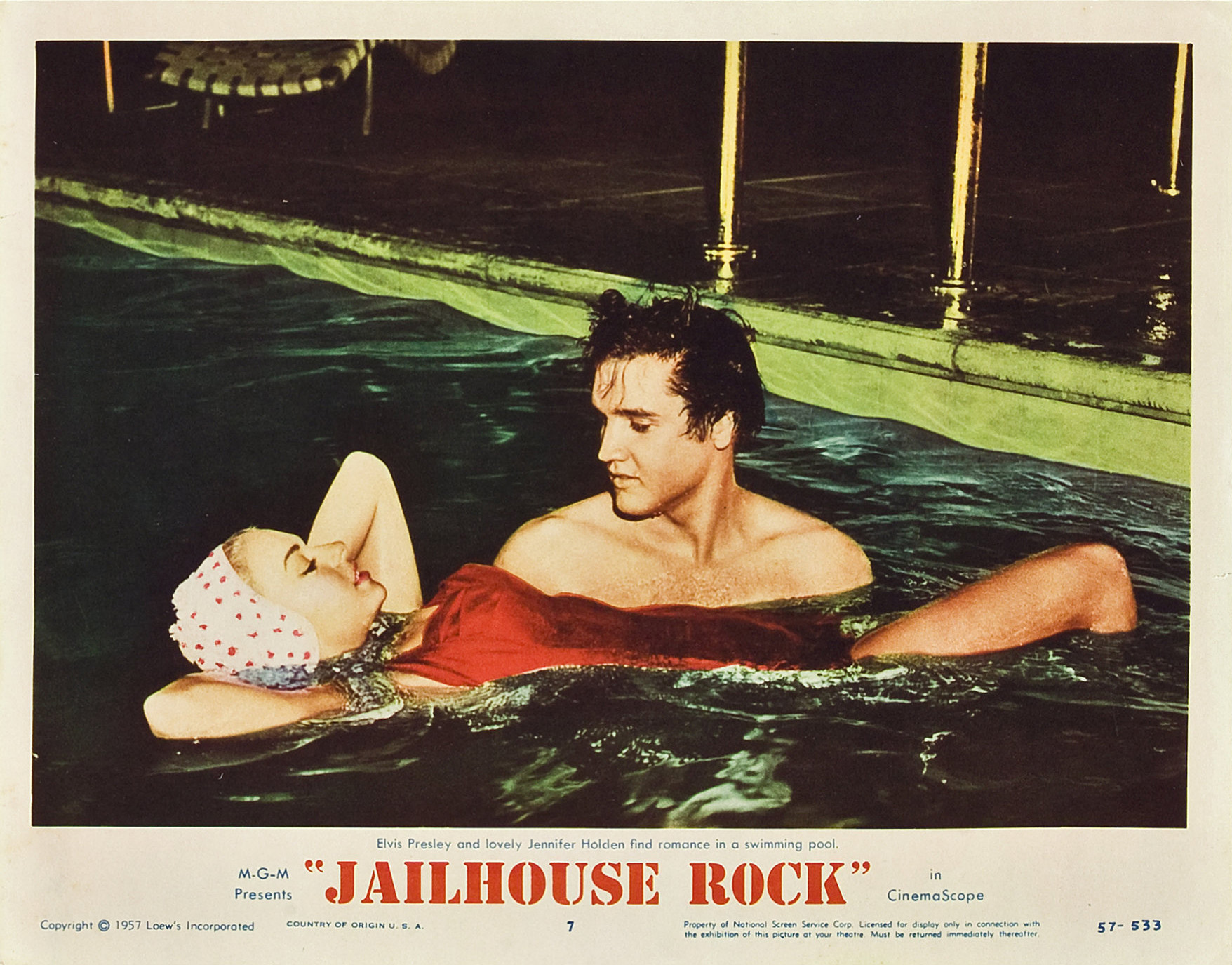
- Elvis Presley and Jennifer Holden in Jailhouse Rock
- Born: October 24, 1936; Chicago, Illinois, U.S.
- Died: May 26, 2022 (aged 85); Grass Valley, California, U.S.
- Occupation: Actress
- Years active: 1957–1958
- Height: 1.67 m (5 ft 6 in)

Jennifer Holden (October 24, 1936 – May 26, 2022) was an American actress who appeared in the films Jailhouse Rock, Buchanan Rides Alone, and Gang War.

Holden was born in Chicago, Illinois on October 24, 1936. Prior to appearing in film she had studied drama with singer and actress Lillian Roth, and appeared on stage. She also had a brief modeling career before being cast in Jailhouse Rock. The film was Holden's debut; after auditioning for the role at MGM in May 1956, she was selected immediately. Holden stated that while making the film in 1957, co-star Elvis Presley took her on a date, to a drag race, and a tour of Hollywood stars' homes. Off set, Elvis made advances towards her, which she resisted. He also rescued her from a serious live wire incident and later confided in her about his anxiety of a potential draft into the army, which would have jeopardized his film career.

After her film career, Holden became a rock-and-roll singer.

Holden died in Grass Valley, California on May 26, 2022, at the age of 85.
