= List of artists who have achieved Japan and U.S. number-one hits =

It is extremely difficult for recording artists to top the charts in two countries, Japan and U.S. that have top 2 largest music markets in the world. (Billboard in the US and Oricon since 1967 and/or Billboard Japan since 2008, two major singles charts from Japan).

Since music consumption in Japan is highly domestic, it is rare that songs by oversea artists reach No.1 in Japanese charts.
On the other hand, as of 2024 only Japanese song that reached No.1 in U.S. is the "Sukiyaki" by Kyu Sakamoto first released in 1961 in Japan before establishment of major singles charts in Japan.

== List of artists who achieved number no.1 on Singles charts of Japan and U.S. ==
No.1 on Billboard Hot 100 and Oricon Singles Chart
No.1 on Billboard 100 and Billboard Japan Hot 100
No.1 on Billboard 100, Oricon Singles Chart and Billboard Japan Hot 100

Year of achievement	Artist	Nationality	First No.1 Song in U.S.	First No.1 Song in Japan	Ref.
1968	Simon & Garfunkel	United States	"The Sound of Silence"	"The Sound of Silence"	
1971	Bee Gees	United Kingdom	"How Can You Mend a Broken Heart"	"Massachusetts"	
1983	Irene Cara	United States	"Flashdance... What a Feeling"	"Flashdance... What a Feeling"	
1995	Celine Dion	Canada	"The Power of Love"	"To Love You More" (with Kryzler & Company)	
1997	Elton John	United Kingdom	"Crocodile Rock"	"Candle in the Wind 1997"	
2008	Leona Lewis	United Kingdom	"Bleeding Love"	"Bleeding Love"	
2011	Lady Gaga	United States	"Just Dance" (featuring Colby O'Donis)	"Born This Way"	
2015	Afrojack	Netherlands	"Give Me Everything" (Pitbull featuring Ne-Yo, Afrojack and Nayer)	"Summer Madness" (Sandaime J Soul Brothers featuring Afrojack)	
2020	BTS	South Korea	"Dynamite"	"For You"	
2024	Bruno Mars	United States	"Nothin' on You" (B.o.B featuring Bruno Mars)	"APT." (with Rosé)	

Note: On Billboard Japan and Oricon official website, "Summer Madness" lacks description of "featuring Afrojack" in spite of Official Avex website includes him as featured Artist. The single released by same artists in 2019, "SCARLET" that reached No.1 on Billboard Japan Hot 100 was given the description of "feat.Afrojack" on the website.On his artist page of Billboard Japan, these songs are not counted as his own entries that have appeared on the charts.

== Singles that reached number 1 in both Japan and the U.S. ==
=== Number-one singles on Billboard Hot 100 and Oricon Singles Chart ===
- 1968 - Simon & Garfunkel – "The Sound of Silence"
- 1983 - Irene Cara – "Flashdance... What a Feeling"
- 1997 - Elton John – "Candle in the Wind 1997"

=== Number-one singles on Billboard Hot 100 and Billboard Japan Hot 100 ===
- 2008 - Leona Lewis – "Bleeding Love"
- 2011 - Lady Gaga – "Born This Way"
- 2021 - BTS – "Butter"
- 2021 - BTS – "Permission to Dance"

== See also ==
- List of Billboard number-one singles
- List of artists who reached number one in the United States
- List of artists who have achieved simultaneous UK and U.S. number-one hits
