= Elvis' Golden Records =

Greatest hits album by Elvis Presley
- Released: March 21, 1958
- Recorded: January 1956 – September 1957
- Genres: Rock and roll, pop
- Length: 32:03
- Label: RCA Victor
- Producers: Steve Sholes, Elvis Presley

Elvis Presley chronology
Jailhouse Rock (1957)	Elvis' Golden Records (1958)	King Creole (1958)

Elvis' Golden Records is a compilation album by American rock and roll singer Elvis Presley, issued by RCA Victor in March 1958. It compiled his hit singles released in 1956 and 1957, and is widely believed to be the first greatest hits album in rock and roll history. It is the first of five RCA Victor Elvis' Golden/Gold Records compilations, the first four of which were issued during Presley's lifetime. The album peaked at number three on the Billboard Top Pop Albums chart and was certified 6× platinum on August 17, 1999, by the Recording Industry Association of America.

== Songs ==
Elvis' Golden Records collects nine number one A-sides along with four B-sides, "Loving You", "That's When Your Heartaches Begin", "Treat Me Nice" and "Anyway You Want Me", and one album track, "Love Me", originally issued on the 1956 LP Elvis. Every flip-side also hit the chart separately from its parent hit side, with four making the Top 40; chart positions noted for those tracks individually. "Love Me" was also included on the Elvis Vol. 1 EP which made the top ten on the singles chart.

In the 1950s, a gold record awarded for a single referred to sales of one million units, different from the definition in use by the late 1970s for albums, where a gold record came to mean album sales of 500,000 units. Exact figures from the RIAA are difficult to confirm, but in the press conference from September 22, 1958, originally released on the RCA Victor EP Elvis Sails in 1958 and included on disc four of the RCA CD boxed set The King of Rock 'n' Roll: The Complete 50s Masters, the interviewer asked Presley for a tally of his gold records. Presley responded, "I have 25 million sellers, and two albums that have sold a million each."

Most of the songs in the compilation were recorded at Radio Recorders in Hollywood, with other sessions at the RCA Victor studios in New York City, at 20th Century-Fox Stage One in Hollywood, and the RCA Victor studios in Nashville, Tennessee. Although RCA Victor executive Steve Sholes was the in-house A&R man for Presley, and nominally in charge of his recording sessions at RCA Victor, accounts by Presley historian Peter Guralnick and Presley discographer Ernst Mikael Jorgensen indicate that Presley himself acted as the producer for his RCA Victor sessions in the 1950s.

The unified Billboard Hot 100 singles chart was not created until August 1958, after the release of this compilation, and of course after the release of all of these singles. Chart positions referenced were taken from the "Best Sellers in Stores" chart, although early statistics for rock and roll records also came from the "Most Played in Jukeboxes" chart.

== Critical reception ==
Professional ratings
Review scores
Source	Rating
AllMusic	3.5/5 stars
Encyclopedia of Popular Music	5/5 stars

In a review for AllMusic, Bruce Eder commented:

This was rock & roll's first greatest-hits album, and it set the standard for all others to follow ... Each of the 14 songs had earned a Gold record award for a million sales, a record unequaled at that time by anyone else in rock & roll ... Elvis' Golden Records does give a bite-sized glimpse of where Elvis had come from and where he was going (for better or worse) musically on the eve of heading into the Army.

== Reissues ==
Elvis' Golden Records is one of Presley's most popular albums and has remained continuously available since its original issue in 1958. RCA first reissued the original 14-track album on compact disc in 1984. This release, in reprocessed (simulated) stereo sound, was quickly withdrawn and the album was reissued in original monophonic. RCA reissued the album on CD again in 1997 and added six bonus tracks, with "Blue Suede Shoes" an unusual track in that it was issued simultaneously in conjunction with every track from Elvis' debut LP Elvis Presley in singles form, more than five months after the release of the album on March 23. Two more charting B-sides, "I Was the One" and "My Baby Left Me", and three Sun Records tracks rounded out the compact disc. RCA Victor had purchased the rights to reissue Sun material when buying Elvis' contract from Sam Phillips in 1955, using Sun recordings to fill out album tracks throughout the decade.

== Track listing ==
Details are taken from the 1958 and 1997 RCA Records albums liner notes and may differ from other sources. See singles discography and song list for additional information.

Original LP

Side 1
No.	Title	Writer(s)	Date recorded	Length
1.	"Hound Dog"	Jerry Leiber, Mike Stoller	July 2, 1956	2:15
2.	"Loving You"	Leiber, Stoller	February 24, 1957	2:12
3.	"All Shook Up"	Otis Blackwell, Elvis Presley	January 12, 1957	1:57
4.	"Heartbreak Hotel"	Mae Axton, Tommy Durden, Presley	January 10, 1956	2:09
5.	"Jailhouse Rock"	Leiber, Stoller	April 30, 1957	2:27
6.	"Love Me"	Leiber, Stoller	September 1, 1956	2:43
7.	"Too Much"	Lee Rosenberg, Bernard Weinman	September 2, 1956	2:31

Side 2
No.	Title	Writer(s)	Date recorded	Length
1.	"Don't Be Cruel"	Blackwell, Presley	July 2, 1956	2:02
2.	"That's When Your Heartaches Begin"	William Raskin, Fred Fisher, Billy Hill	January 13, 1957	3:21
3.	"(Let Me Be Your) Teddy Bear"	Kal Mann, Bernie Lowe	January 24, 1957	1:45
4.	"Love Me Tender"	Presley, Vera Matson	August 24, 1956	2:41
5.	"Treat Me Nice"	Leiber, Stoller	September 5, 1957	2:10
6.	"Anyway You Want Me (That's How I Will Be)"	Aaron Schroeder, Cliff Owens	July 2, 1956	2:14
7.	"I Want You, I Need You, I Love You"	George Mysels, Ira Kosloff	April 14, 1956	2:40

1997 CD reissue

Bonus tracks
No.	Title	Writer(s)	Date recorded	Length
15.	"My Baby Left Me"	Arthur Crudup	January 30, 1956	2:12
16.	"I Was the One"	Aaron Schroeder, Claude DeMetrius, Hal Blair, Bill Peppers	January 11, 1956	2:34
17.	"That's All Right"	Crudup	July 5, 1954	1:55
18.	"Baby, Let's Play House"	Arthur Gunter	February 5, 1955	2:16
19.	"Mystery Train"	Herman Parker Jr., Sam Phillips	July 11, 1955	2:24
20.	"Blue Suede Shoes"	Carl Perkins	January 30, 1956	1:59

Original UK LP

Side 1
No.	Title	Writer(s)	Date recorded	Length
1.	"Hound Dog"	Leiber, Stoller	July 2, 1956	2:15
2.	"I Love You Because"	Leon Payne	July 5, 1954	2:42
3.	"All Shook Up"	Blackwell, Presley	January 12, 1957	1:57
4.	"Heartbreak Hotel"	Axton, Durden, Presley	January 10, 1956	2:09
5.	"You're a Heartbreaker"	Jack Sallee	January 2, 1954	2:12
6.	"Love Me"	Leiber, Stoller	September 1956	2:43
7.	"Too Much"	Rosenberg, Weinman	September 2, 1956	2:31

Side 2
No.	Title	Writer(s)	Date recorded	Length
1.	"Don't Be Cruel"	Blackwell, Presley	July 2, 1956	2:02
2.	"That's When Your Heartaches Begin"	Fisher, Hill, Raskin	January 13, 1957	3:21
3.	"I'll Never Let You Go (Little Darlin')"	Jimmy Wakely	September 10, 1954	2:24
4.	"Love Me Tender"	Presley, Matson	August 24, 1956	2:41
5.	"I Forgot to Remember to Forget"	Stan Kesler, Charlie Feathers	July 11, 1955	2:28
6.	"Anyway You Want Me (That's How I Will Be)"	Schroeder, Owens	July 2, 1956	2:14
7.	"I Want You, I Need You, I Love You"	Mysels, Kosloff	April 14, 1956	2:40

== Chart performance ==
Chart (1958–59)	Peak position
Italian Albums (HitParadeItalia)	1
US Billboard 200	3

== Certifications ==
Region	Certification	Certified units/sales
Canada (Music Canada)	Platinum	100,000^{^}
United Kingdom (BPI)	Silver	60,000^{*}
United States (RIAA)	6× Platinum	6,000,000^{^}
^{*} Sales figures based on certification alone.^{^} Shipments figures based on certification alone.
