= (You're So Square) Baby I Don't Care =

1957 song recorded by Elvis Presley

Song by Elvis Presley

from the EP Jailhouse Rock
- Released: October 30, 1957
- Recorded: May 3 and 9, 1957
- Studio: Radio Recorders (Hollywood)
- Length: 1:51
- Label: RCA Victor
- Songwriters: Jerry Leiber; Mike Stoller
- Producer: Jeff Alexander

"(You're So Square) Baby I Don't Care" is a 1957 song originally recorded by Elvis Presley and performed in the MGM film Jailhouse Rock. It was written by Jerry Leiber and Mike Stoller for the film. Presley plays electric bass on the song.

== Background ==
Elvis Presley's version, one of the few songs in which he plays the electric bass, was recorded on May 3, with the vocal track added on May 9, 1957, and released on his Jailhouse Rock EP. It reached number 14 on the R&B charts. A notable version was performed by Buddy Holly, who included the song on his second album Buddy Holly, and his version made the British singles chart in 1961, reaching number 12. A 1983 re-release of the Elvis Presley version reached number 61 on the UK singles chart.

The song's narrator addresses the object of their affection, and points out all the ways that the addressee is square—how they are out of touch with modern trends in music and romance. Then the narrator tells the subject of the song that they love them in spite of, and maybe because of this.
