= Young and Beautiful (Elvis Presley song) =

Song by Elvis Presley

from the EP Jailhouse Rock
- Published: October 1957
- Recorded: 30 April 1957
- Label: RCA Victor
- Songwriters: Aaron Schroeder, Abner Silver
- Producer: Jeffrey Alexander

"Young and Beautiful" is a song written by Aaron Schroeder and Abner Silver. It was performed by Elvis Presley as the last song of the 1957 film Jailhouse Rock.

Presley recorded it on April 30, 1957, in Radio Recorders Studio, Hollywood.

"Young and Beautiful" was released on the Jailhouse Rock EP (RCA Victor EPA 4114) in October 1957.
