= Treat Me Nice =

Single by Elvis Presley
- A-side: "Jailhouse Rock"
- Released: September 24, 1957
- Recorded: September 5, 1957, Radio Recorders, Hollywood, California
- Genre: Rock and roll, rhythm and blues
- Length: 2:10
- Label: RCA Victor
- Songwriter: Leiber-Stoller
- Producer: Leiber-Stoller

Elvis Presley singles chronology
"(Let Me Be Your) Teddy Bear" / "Loving You" (1957)	"Jailhouse Rock" / "Treat Me Nice" (1957)	"Don't" / "I Beg of You" (1958)

"Treat Me Nice" is a song recorded by Elvis Presley for his film Jailhouse Rock (1957), in which it was featured prominently. It was also used as the B-side of the title song but was not included on the original release of the film's soundtrack EP.

The song was later included in the musical revue Smokey Joe's Cafe, which consisted entirely of songs written by Jerry Leiber and Mike Stoller (and occasionally other collaborators as well).

== Chart performance ==
Chart (1958)	Peak position
U.S. Billboard Hot 100	27
U.S. Billboard Hot Country Singles	11
U.S. Billboard Most Played R&B	7

== Personnel ==
- Elvis Presley – lead vocal
- Scotty Moore – electric guitar
- Bill Black – double bass
- D.J. Fontana – drums
- Mike Stoller – piano
- The Jordanaires – backing vocals
- Steve Sholes – producer
- Thorne Nogar – engineer
