= Jailhouse Rock (film) =

1957 film by Richard Thorpe, starring Elvis Presley

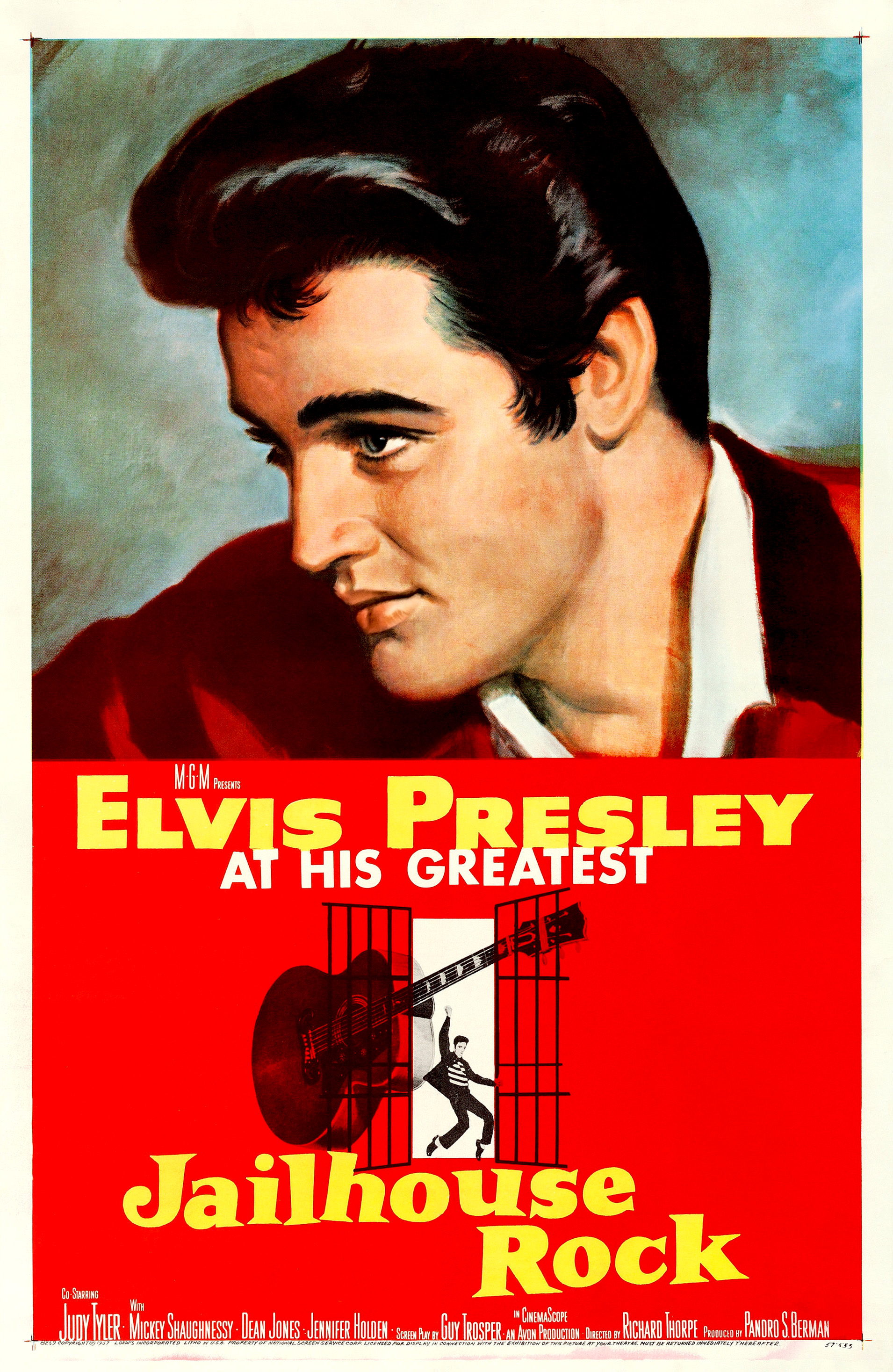
- Theatrical release poster by Bradshaw Crandell
- Directed by: Richard Thorpe
- Screenplay by: Guy Trosper
- Story by: Nedrick Young
- Produced by: Pandro S. Berman
- Starring: Elvis Presley; Judy Tyler; Mickey Shaughnessy; Vaughn Taylor; Jennifer Holden
- Cinematography: Robert J. Bronner
- Edited by: Ralph E. Winters
- Music by: Jeff Alexander
- Production company: Avon Productions
- Distributed by: Metro-Goldwyn-Mayer
- Release dates: October 24, 1957 (Memphis); November 8, 1957 (rest of United States)
- Running time: 96 minutes
- Country: United States
- Language: English
- Budget: $1 million
- Box office: $4 million

Jailhouse Rock is a 1957 American musical drama film directed by Richard Thorpe and starring Elvis Presley. Adapted by Guy Trosper from a story written by Nedrick Young, the film tells the story of Vince Everett (Presley), a convict who learns the guitar while in prison and becomes a star following his release. Four of the film's songs were written by Jerry Leiber and Mike Stoller including the title track, which became a highly-praised production number in the film as well as one of Presley's biggest hit singles, spending seven weeks at number one on the U.S. charts.

Jailhouse Rock premiered in Memphis, Tennessee on October 17 or 24, 1957, and was released nationwide on November 8. It peaked at #3 on the Variety box-office chart and finished #14 for the year, grossing $4 million. The film initially earned mixed reviews, with much of the negative targeted at the unpleasant personality of the character played by Presley. The release was also somewhat overshadowed by the tragic highway death of leading lady Judy Tyler shortly after the film's completion. Presley reportedly was so devastated by Tyler's death that he never watched the film or discussed it.

On December 28, 2004, Jailhouse Rock was selected for preservation in the National Film Registry by the Library of Congress, who deemed it "culturally, aesthetically or historically significant."

== Plot ==
Construction worker Vince Everett accidentally kills a drunken man in a brawl that he did not start and is sentenced to between a minimum of one to a maximum of ten years in the state penitentiary. His cellmate, washed-up country singer Hunk Houghton, incarcerated for bank robbery, teaches Vince some guitar chords. Hunk then convinces Vince to participate in an inmate show that is broadcast on nationwide television. After his appearance, Vince receives fan letters, but the warden prevents their delivery.

Hunk convinces Vince to sign a pact to become equal partners in his act when they are both free. Later, during an inmate riot in the mess hall, a guard shoves Vince, who retaliates by striking him. As punishment, the warden orders Vince to be lashed with a whip. Vince later learns that Hunk attempted to bribe the guards to forego the punishment but did not have enough money.

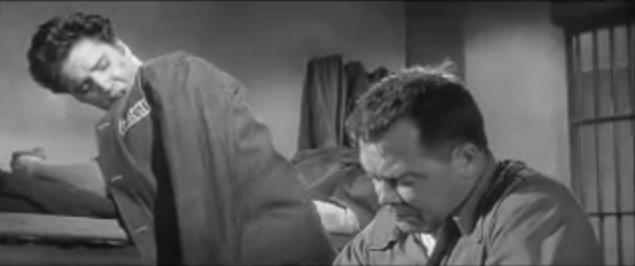
Elvis Presley as Vince Everett talks to Mickey Shaughnessy as Hunk Houghton in their cell.

Upon Vince's release 14 months later, the warden gives him his withheld fan mail. Hunk promises Vince a singing job at a nightclub owned by a friend. There, Vince meets Peggy Van Alden, a promoter for pop singer Mickey Alba. Vince is surprised when the club owner denies him a job as a singer but offers him a job as a bar boy. To prove himself to the owner, Vince takes the stage to sing when the house band takes a break. However, a customer laughs throughout the performance. Enraged, Vince smashes his guitar and leaves the club. Peggy then persuades him to record a demo so that he can listen to himself sing. The recording helps Vince improve his style, and he records a song. Peggy takes the tape to Geneva Records, where the manager seems unimpressed, but reluctantly agrees to play the tape for his boss in New York. The next day, Peggy informs Vince that the song has been sold. She then takes him to a party at her parents' home, but Vince leaves after offending a guest whom he mistakenly believes is belittling him. Angry, Peggy confronts Vince, who kisses her. Later, the two discover that Geneva Records gave the song to Mickey Alba. Alba recorded and released the song, thereby stealing it. Infuriated, Vince storms into the label's office and attacks the manager.

To avoid a similar misfortune, Vince convinces Peggy to form their own label, which they name Laurel Records, and hire attorney Mr. Shores to oversee the business. Vince then records another song and begins pitching it. The song is universally rejected until Peggy convinces a friend, disc jockey Teddy Talbot, to air it. Then, it becomes a hit. Vince asks Peggy out to celebrate but is disappointed to learn that she had already accepted a dinner date with Teddy.

Later, Vince makes arrangements for another television show. At a party, Hunk, who has been granted parole, persuades Vince to give him a part in the show in an effort to revive his own music career. However, Hunk's number ends up being cut because of his outdated music style. Vince later informs Hunk that the pact that they signed in prison is worthless. However, indebted to Hunk for having tried to bribe the guards, Vince offers him a job with his entourage.

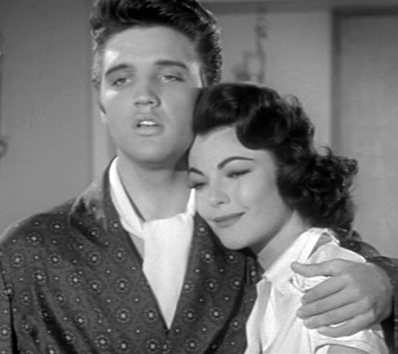
Presley as Vince Everett hugs Judy Tyler as Peggy Van Alden as he sings "Young and Beautiful".

Vince soon becomes a star. However, Peggy no longer speaks with Vince, as his success has made him arrogant. Vince signs a movie deal, and the studio head asks him to spend the day with his conceited costar Sherry Wilson for publicity purposes. Sherry then falls in love with Vince after shooting a kissing scene.

Mr. Shores later approaches Vince with an offer from Geneva Records to purchase Laurel Records and sign him to a rich contract. Peggy refuses to sell and is devastated when Vince wants to close the deal anyway. Enraged by Vince's egotism and treatment of Peggy, Hunk starts a fight and strikes Vince in the throat, endangering the latter's voice and singing ability. At the hospital, Vince forgives Hunk and realizes that he loves Peggy and that she loves him. Vince's doctor later informs him that his vocal cords are fully recovered, and in the living room, Vince tests his voice by singing to Peggy. Realizing that Vince's singing voice is intact and his worries are unfounded, the two put their arms around each other as the film closes.

== Cast ==
- Elvis Presley as Vince Everett, an ex-con who becomes a singing star. Producer Pandro S. Berman's wife convinced him to make a film with Presley in the leading role. Presley's manager, Colonel Tom Parker, was only interested in the film's score and the rights to record sales and publishing royalties, and Presley was paid $250,000 and 50% of the film's royalties.
- Judy Tyler as Peggy Van Alden, a music promoter who helps Vince build his career and becomes his lover. Tyler was previously known for her part as Princess Summerfall Winterspring on the television show Howdy Doody and as Suzy in the Broadway musical Pipe Dream (1955). Tyler took a three-month leave of absence from Howdy Doody to shoot the film. Tyler and her husband were killed in a car crash on July 3, just days after production was completed and before its premiere. Presley was so devastated that he refused to watch the film.
- Mickey Shaughnessy as Hunk Houghton, Vince's cellmate and a former country singer. He teaches Vince the guitar and later becomes Vince's assistant. Shaughnessy was known as Leva in From Here to Eternity (1953). He was also a comedian, and Variety reported that Shaughnessy had performed a 45-minute routine deriding Presley sometime before the film was made. Elaine Dundy, author of the book Elvis and Gladys (1985), considered his selection an "odd choice" and the result of Berman's lack of involvement with casting.
- Vaughn Taylor as Mr. Shores, an attorney whom Vince and Peggy hire to manage Vince's financial affairs.
- William Forrest as the studio head (uncredited)
- Jennifer Holden as starlet Sherry Wilson. The film was Holden's debut; after auditioning for the role at MGM in May 1956, she was selected immediately. She studied drama with Lillian Roth and had previously appeared on stage.
- Dean Jones as disc jockey Teddy Talbot. Jones was formerly a blues singer, and he was coached for the role by disc jockeys Ira Cooke and Dewey Phillips. Jones went on to star in a string of Walt Disney films.
- Anne Neyland as Laury Jackson
- "Jailhouse Rock" cowriter Mike Stoller (of the Leiber and Stoller songwriting partnership) and Presley's regular band during that period—Scotty Moore, Bill Black and D. J. Fontana—appear as Vince's band throughout the film, though uncredited.

== Production ==
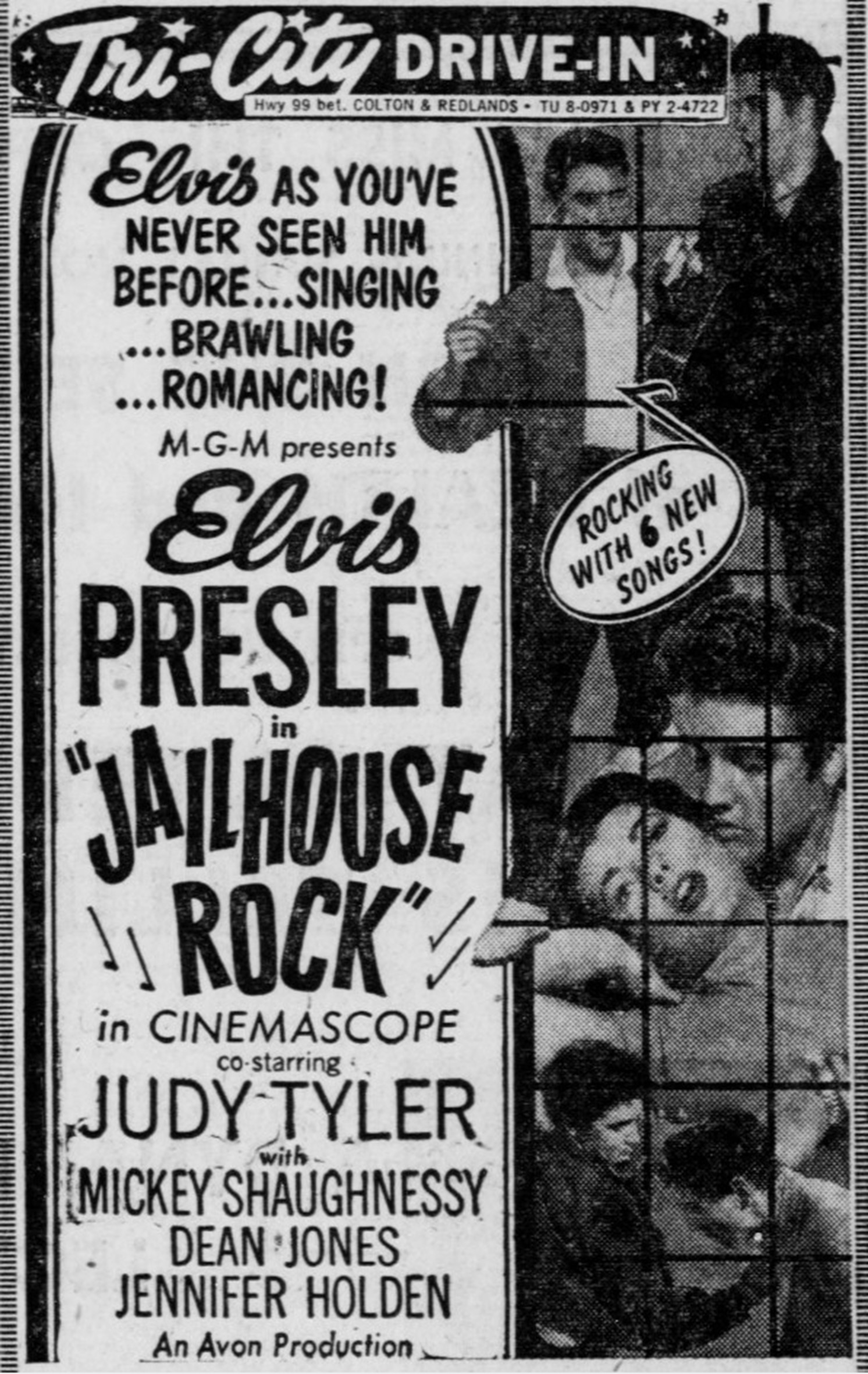
Drive-in advertisement from 1957

Jailhouse Rock was Presley's third film and his first for Metro-Goldwyn-Mayer studios, filmed in Culver City, California. The film was originally titled The Hard Way and was changed to Jailhouse Kid before MGM finally settled on Jailhouse Rock. The film was not listed with the studio's planned releases for the year because it was based on a story by Nedrick Young, a blacklisted writer. During production, producer Pandro Berman was more focused on another of his productions, the 1958 film The Brothers Karamazov. He allowed studio head Benny Thau and William Morris Agency president Abe Lastfogel to select the cast. Richard Thorpe, who had a reputation for quickly finishing projects, was chosen to direct the film.

The first scene filmed was the title dance sequence to the song "Jailhouse Rock". Presley was not initially pleased with the direction of choreographer Alex Romero, so Romero asked Presley to try his own moves for the final sequence. The scene has often been cited as Presley's greatest musical moment on screen. Filming began on May 13, 1957, with the newly created choreography. Russ Tamblyn helped Elvis with the choreography.

Presley's characteristic hairstyle and sideburns were covered with a wig and makeup for the musical and jail scenes. During the performance, one of Presley's dental caps detached and became lodged in his lung, and he spent a night in the hospital before filming resumed the next day.

Thorpe, who usually filmed scenes in a single take, finished the film by June 17, 1957.

=== Soundtrack ===
Before production began, rock-and-roll songwriting partners Jerry Leiber and Mike Stoller were commissioned to create the film's soundtrack, but they did not send any material to MGM for months. In April 1957, the studio summoned the writers to New York and Jean Aberbach, director of the Hill & Range music publishing company, confronted them demanding to see the songs. When told that there was no material, Aberbach locked the songwriters in their hotel room and would not allow them to leave until they had written songs. Four hours later, Leiber and Stoller had written "I Want to Be Free", "Treat Me Nice", "(You're So Square) Baby I Don't Care", and "Jailhouse Rock".

Presley recorded the finished songs at Radio Recorders in Hollywood on April 30 and May 3, 1957, with an additional session at the MGM soundstage in Hollywood on May 9 for "Don't Leave Me Now". Leiber and Stoller were invited to the recording session of April 30, where they met Presley, who convinced MGM to cast Stoller as the band's pianist in the film. During filming, Presley mimed the words for film's musical numbers, and the music was later added to the finished scenes.

"Jailhouse Rock"
Elvis Presley's "Jailhouse Rock".

=== Track list ===
The following songs in the film were performed by Presley unless otherwise noted:

- "One More Day" (Sid Tepper, Roy C. Bennett) – performed by Mickey Shaughnessy
- "Young and Beautiful" (Abner Silver, Aaron Schroeder)
- "I Want to Be Free" (Jerry Leiber, Mike Stoller)
- "Don't Leave Me Now" (Aaron Schroeder, Ben Weisman)
- "Treat Me Nice" (Jerry Leiber, Mike Stoller)
- "Jailhouse Rock" (Jerry Leiber, Mike Stoller) – dance routine choreographed by Elvis Presley
- "(You're So Square) Baby I Don't Care" (Jerry Leiber, Mike Stoller) - Presley also played electric bass

== Release ==
Scene from the original theatrical trailer

Jailhouse Rock premiered on October 24, 1957, at Loews State Theater in Memphis. Female lead Judy Tyler had been killed in an automobile accident soon before the film's release, and a devastated Presley did not attend the premiere. (Note: Some sources, such as Adam Victor in The Elvis Encyclopedia and Albert Goldman in Elvis, claim that Presley never watched the completed film.) The film opened nationally on November 8 at the Warner Theatre in New York City. The film premiered at the Odeon Cinema, Richmond on January 17, 1958.

== Reception ==
=== Box office ===
The film peaked at #3 on the Variety box-office chart and reached #14 for the year.

According to MGM records, the film earned $3.2 million in the U.S. and Canada and $1,075,000 elsewhere during its initial theatrical run for a profit of $1,051,000.

In 1957, Presley was ranked the fourth-leading box-office commodity in the film industry. According to Variety, by 1969, Jailhouse Rock's gross income in the U.S. and Canada was comparable to that of The Wizard of Oz (1939).

=== Critical response ===
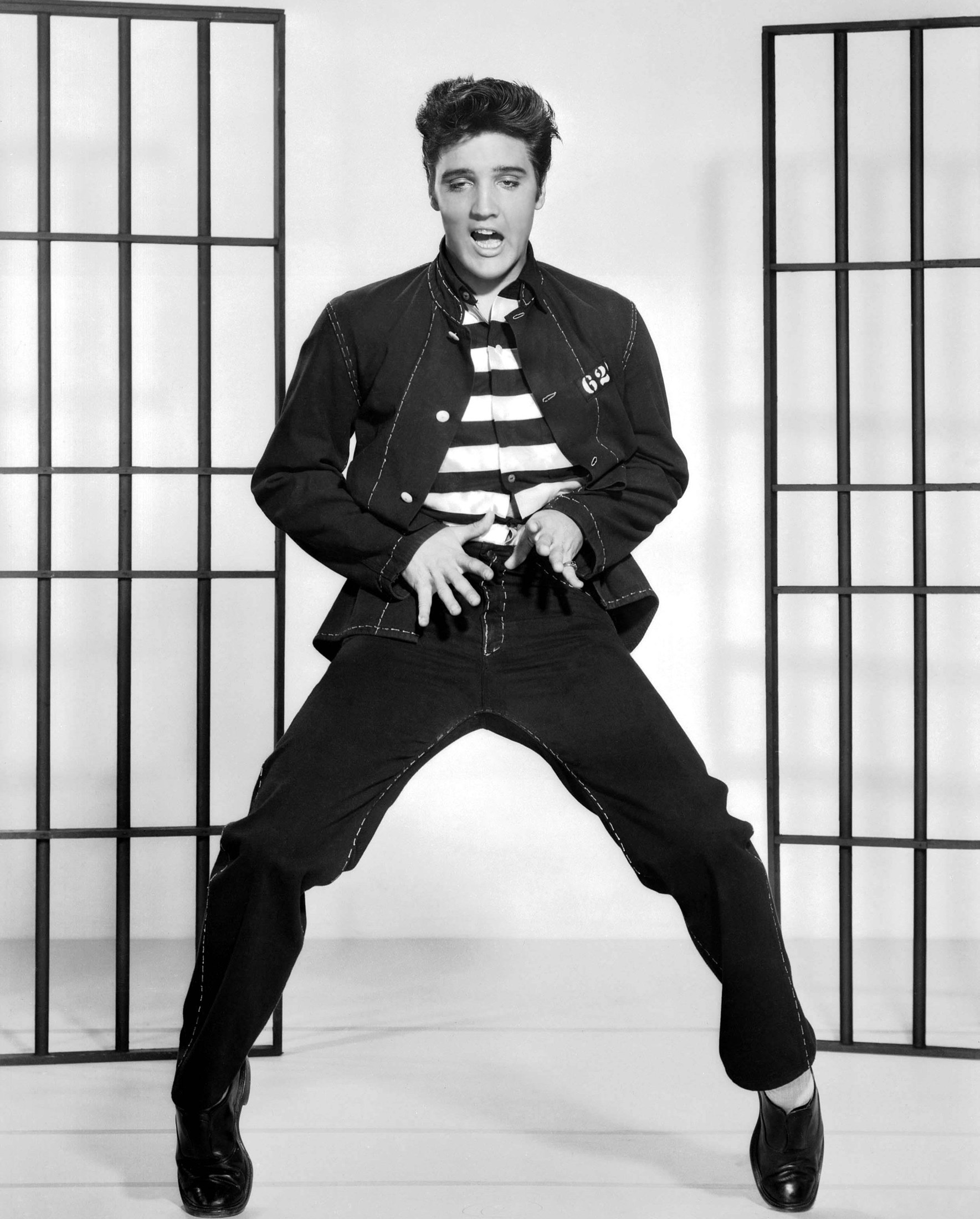
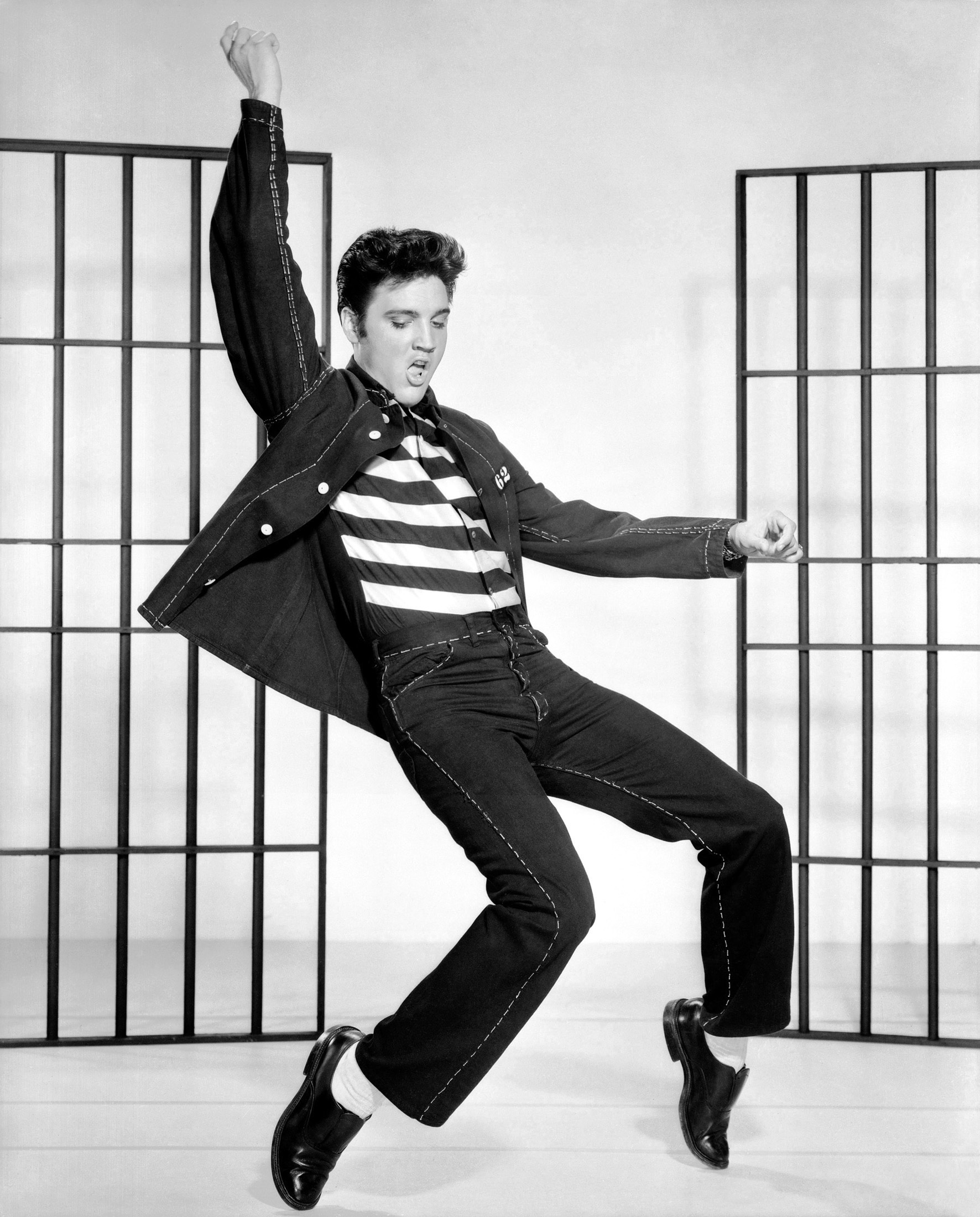
Publicity photos for the film featuring Presley during the dance sequence for "Jailhouse Rock"

Jailhouse Rock earned mixed, largely negative, reviews upon release, although critical opinion has tended to be more favorable over time. Some contemporary critics found it scandalous because it portrayed Vince Everett as an antiheroic character, presented a convict as a hero, used the word "hell" as a profanity and included a scene with Presley in bed with Tyler. The Parent-Teacher Association described the film as "a hackneyed, blown-up tale with cheap human values." The New York Times criticized Guy Trosper for writing a screenplay in which the secondary characters were "forced to hang on to the hero's flying mane and ego for the entire picture." Cue magazine called the film "[an] unpleasant, mediocre and tasteless drama."

Some publications criticized Presley. Time panned his onstage personality, while The Miami News compared the film with horror pictures and wrote, "Only Elvis Presley and his 'Jailhouse Rock' can keep pace with the movie debut of this 'personality,' the records show. In estimating the lasting appeal of their grotesque performer." Jazz magazine Down Beat wrote that Presley's acting was "amateurish and bland." British magazine The Spectator described Presley's evolution from his "silly" performance in Loving You to "dangerously near being repulsive."

Other reviewers responded more positively to the film. Louise Boyca of The Schenectady Gazette wrote that "it's dear Elvis that gets the soft focus camera and the arty photography." Boyca remarked upon the low production costs of the film, and said that Presley was "in top singing and personality form." The Gadsden Times said, "Elvis Presley not only proves himself as a dramatic actor ... but also reveals his versatility by dancing on the screen for the first time. The movie ... also contains Elvis' unique style of singing." Look favored the film, describing how one audience "registered, loud and often, its approval of what may accurately be described as the star's first big dramatic singing role."

More recent critics have tended to praise the film for its vivid portrayal of an iconic moment in music history. Indeed, the portion of the movie after the Presley character is released from prison contains many incidents that parallel aspects of Presley's own career, making Jailhouse Rock the closest to an autobiographical role of any found in Presley's films. Leonard Maltin wrote that "Presley's best film captures the legend in all his nostril-flaring pre-Army glory." Author Thomas Doherty wrote in his 2002 book Teenagers and Teenpics: The Juvenalization of American Movies in the 1950s: "In Jailhouse Rock, the treatment of rock 'n' roll music, both as narrative content and as cinematic performance is knowing and respectful ... The elaborate choreography for the title tune, the long takes and uninterrupted screen time given to the other numbers, and the musical pacing—the rock 'n' roll builds in quality and intensity—all show an indigenous appreciation of Presley's rock 'n' Roll." Critic Hal Erickson of AllRovi wrote that the film "is a perfect balance of song and story from beginning to end." Mark Deming, also of AllRovi, wrote that Jailhouse Rock was "one of [Presley's] few vehicles which really caught his raw, sexy energy and sneering charisma on film."

The review aggregate website Rotten Tomatoes lists the film with an overall 67% "Fresh" approval rating based on 42 reviews. It currently has a Metacritic score of 68 out of 100, based on reviews from 12 critics, indicating "generally favorable reviews" .

== Accolades ==
In 1991, Jerry Leiber and Mike Stoller were awarded with an ASCAP Award for Most-Performed Feature Film Standards for the song "Jailhouse Rock". In 2004, Jailhouse Rock was selected for preservation in the United States National Film Registry, as it was deemed "culturally, historically, or aesthetically significant." The film is famous for the dance sequence (also choreographed by Presley) in which Presley sings the title track while on stage, cavorting with other inmates through a set resembling a block of jail cells. The sequence is widely acknowledged as the most memorable musical scene in Presley's 30 narrative films, and is credited by some music historians as the prototype for the modern music video. Jailhouse Rock ranked 495th on Empire's 2008 list of the 500 greatest films of all time.

- 2004: AFI's 100 Years...100 Songs:
  - "Jailhouse Rock" – #21
- 2006: AFI's Greatest Movie Musicals – Nominated

== See also ==
- List of American films of 1957
- Elvis Presley on film and television
- Jukebox musical
- Rock music

== Works cited ==
Books

- Brown, Peter Harry; Broeske, Pat H. (1997). Down at the End of Lonely Street: The Life and Death of Elvis Presley. New York City: Dutton. ISBN 978-0-525-94246-7.
- Browne, Blaine; Cottrell, Robert (2008). Modern American Lives: Individuals and Issues in American History Since 1945. Armonk: M.E. Sharpe. ISBN 978-0-7656-2223-5.
- Clayton, Marie (2006). Elvis Presley: Unseen Archives. Bath: Paragon Pub. ISBN 978-1-4054-0032-9.
- Collins, Ace (2005). Untold Gold: The Stories Behind Elvis's #1 Hits. Chicago: Chicago Review Press. ISBN 978-1-55652-565-0.
- Cotten, Lee (1985). All Shook Up: Elvis Day-by-Day, 1954–1977. Ann Arbor: Pierian Press. ISBN 978-0-87650-172-6.
- Denisoff, Serge; Romanowski, William (1991). Risky Business: Rock in Film. New Brunswick: Transaction Publishers. ISBN 978-0-88738-843-9.
- Dickinson, Kay (2008). Off Key: When Film and Music Won't Work Together. Oxford: Oxford University Press. ISBN 978-0-19-532663-5.
- Doherty, Thomas (2002). Teenagers and Teenpics: The Juvenilization of American Movies in the 1950s. Philadelphia: Temple University Press. ISBN 978-1-56639-946-3.
- Dundy, Elaine (2004). Elvis and Gladys. Jackson: University Press of Mississippi. ISBN 978-1-57806-634-6.
- Eagan, Daniel (2010). America's Film Legacy: The Authoritative Guide to the Landmark Movies in the National Film Registry. New York City: Continuum. ISBN 978-0-8264-2977-3.
- Farmer, Brett (2000). Spectacular Passions: Cinema, Fantasy, Gay Male Spectatorships. Durham: Duke University Press. ISBN 978-0-8223-2589-5.
- Finler, Joel Waldo (2003). The Hollywood Story (3rd ed.). London: Wallflower Press. ISBN 978-1-903364-66-6.
- Gabbard, Krin (1996). Jammin' at the Margins: Jazz and the American Cinema. Chicago: University of Chicago Press. ISBN 978-0-226-27788-2.
- Garner, Paul; Mrotek, Sharon (1999). Mousie Garner: Autobiography of a Vaudeville Stooge. Jefferson: McFarland. ISBN 978-0-7864-0581-7.
- Giglio, Ernest (2010). Here's Looking at You: Hollywood, Film & Politics. New York City: Peter Lang. ISBN 978-1-4331-0644-6.
- Glut, Donald F; Harmon, Jim (1975). The Great Television Heroes. Garden City: Doubleday. ISBN 978-0-385-05167-5.
- Goldman, Albert Harry (1981). Elvis. New York City: McGraw-Hill. ISBN 978-0-07-023657-8.
- Guralnick, Peter (1994). Last Train to Memphis: The Rise of Elvis Presley. Boston: Back Bay Books. ISBN 978-0-316-33225-5.
- Guralnick, Peter; Jorgensen, Ernst (1999). Elvis: Day by Day: The Definitive Record of His Life and Music. New York City: Ballantine Books. ISBN 978-0-345-42089-3.
- Humphries, Patrick (2003). Elvis the #1 Hits: The Secret History of the Classics. Kansas City: Andrews McMeel Publishing. ISBN 978-0-7407-3803-6.
- Jorgensen, Ernst (1998). Elvis Presley A Life in Music: The Complete Recording Sessions. New York City: St. Martin's Press. ISBN 978-0-312-18572-5.
- Millard, Andre (2005). America on Record: A History of Recorded Sound (2nd ed.). New York City: Cambridge University Press. ISBN 978-0-521-83515-2.
- Poore, Billy (1998). Rockabilly: A Forty-Year Journey. Milwaukee: Hal Leonard Corp. ISBN 978-0-7935-9142-8.
- Relyea, Robert; Relyea, Craig (2008). Not So Quiet On The Set: My Life in Movies During Hollywood's Macho Era. New York City: iUniverse. ISBN 978-0-595-71332-5.
- Slaughter, Todd (2005). The Elvis Archives. London: Omnibus Press. ISBN 978-1-84609-067-7.
- Templeton, Steve; Craig, Yvonne (2002). Elvis Presley: Silver Screen Icon: A Collection of Movie Posters. Johnson City, Tennessee: The Overmountain Press. ISBN 978-1-57072-232-5.
- Victor, Adam (2008). The Elvis Encyclopedia. New York City: Overlook Duckworth. ISBN 978-0-7156-3816-3.
- Worth, Fred; Tamerius, Steve (1992). Elvis: His Life From A to Z. New York City: Wings Books. ISBN 978-0-517-06634-8.

Journals

- Boyka, Louise (November 28, 1957). "Elvis in 'Jailhouse Rock' Keeps Fans in Tears". Schenectady Gazette.
- Johnson, Erskine (November 3, 1957). "Hollywood Today!". Gadsden Times.
- Tynan, John (January 9, 1958). "Farewell, Elvis?". Down Beat. 25 (1–6). Maher Publications.
- "Monster' Films Get Big Play". The Miami News. December 8, 1957.
- "Young Judy Tyler Gives Her Formula for Broadway Success". The Sunday News Press. Vol. 79, no. 26. St. Joseph News-Press. February 25, 1956.
- "Movie Reviews". Cue: The Weekly Magazine of New York Life. Cue Publishing Co. February 8, 1958.
- "Jailhouse Rock – Movie Review". Look. 21 (14–26). Cowles Communications. September 17, 1957.
- "The Spectator". 200. Ian Gilmour. March 21, 1958.
- "The PTA magazine". 52. National Congress of Parents and Teachers. 1957.
- "The Hollywood Reporter". 317 (1–18). Wilkerson Daily Corp. April 16, 1991.
- "Top Grosses of 1957". Variety. January 8, 1958.

Other

- Erickson, Hal; Deming, Mark. "Jailhouse Rock – Synopsis/ Jailhouse Rock – Review". AllRovi.
- Staff. "Consumer Price Index (estimate) 1800–2012". Federal Reserve Bank of Minneapolis. Archived from the original on August 22, 2012.
- "Jailhouse Rock (1957)". TCM. Turner Entertainment Networks, Inc. Archived from the original on July 29, 2011.
- "The 500 Greatest Movies of All Time". Empire. 2008.
- "Jailhouse Rock (1957)". Rotten Tomatoes. Flixster, Inc.
