= King Creole (soundtrack) =

Soundtrack album by Elvis Presley
- Released: September 19, 1958
- Recorded: January 15 – February 11, 1958
- Studio: Radio Recorders (Hollywood)
- Genres: Rock and roll; jazz; blues
- Length: 22:01
- Label: RCA Victor
- Producers: Walter Scharf, Phil Khagan

Elvis Presley chronology
Elvis' Golden Records (1958)	King Creole (1958)	For LP Fans Only (1959)

Singles from King Creole
- 1. "Hard Headed Woman" Released: June 10, 1958; 2. "King Creole" Released: September 1958

Professional ratings
Review scores
Source	Rating
AllMusic	3/5 stars
MusicHound	4/5 stars
Rough Guides	3/5 stars
Uncut	5/5 stars

King Creole is the second soundtrack album by American singer and musician Elvis Presley, issued by RCA Victor, LPM 1884 in mono in September 1958, recorded in four days at Radio Recorders in Hollywood. It contains songs written and recorded expressly for the 1958 film of the same name starring Presley, and peaked at No. 2 on the Billboard Top Pop Albums chart. The album was previously released as an EP album with two volumes, King Creole Vol 1 and King Creole Vol 2. King Creole Vol 1 peaked at No. 1 for 30 weeks on the EP album charts. It followed the film's release by over ten weeks. It was certified Gold on July 15, 1999, by the Recording Industry Association of America.

== Content ==
The bulk of the songs originated from the stable of writers contracted to Hill and Range, the publishing company jointly owned by Presley and Colonel Tom Parker: Fred Wise, Ben Weisman, Claude Demetrius, Aaron Schroeder, Sid Tepper, and Roy C. Bennett. Conspicuous in their relatively limited contribution were Jerry Leiber and Mike Stoller, who had come to an impasse with the Colonel during the making of the previous movie, Jailhouse Rock (1957), in which they had practically dominated the musical proceedings. Furious over mere songwriters having such easy access to Presley without going through Parker's "proper channels", the Colonel closed off their avenue to his prize client, especially since the duo had also tried to influence Presley's film direction, pitching him an idea to do a gritty adaptation of Nelson Algren's recent novel, A Walk on the Wild Side (1956), with Elia Kazan directing, and Leiber and Stoller providing the music. The Colonel put the kibosh on such notions, although echoes of the concept remained in the film, and the pair still managed to place three songs on the soundtrack, including the title track and "Trouble", arguably the film's best songs. Presley's performance of "Trouble" in the film alludes to Muddy Waters and Bo Diddley; he would return to the song for his tremendously successful 1968 television comeback special.

The songs "Hard Headed Woman" and "Don't Ask Me Why" appeared as two sides of a single on July 10, 1958, to coincide with the release of the film. "Hard Headed Woman", the A-side, and "Don't Ask Me Why" both made the pop singles chart, peaking at number one and number 25 respectively.

== Reissues ==
RCA first reissued the original 11-track album on compact disc in 1988. In 1997, RCA reissued the album again in an expanded edition with an additional seven bonus tracks including the song "Danny" recorded during the same sessions, with six alternates, four previously unreleased. In 2015, King Creole was reissued on the Follow That Dream label in a special edition that contained the original album tracks along with all available alternate takes.

== Track listing ==
=== Original release ===
Side one
No.	Title	Writer(s)	Recording date	Length
1.	"King Creole"	Jerry Leiber and Mike Stoller	January 23, 1958	2:16
2.	"As Long as I Have You"	Fred Wise and Ben Weisman	January 16, 1958	1:50
3.	"Hard Headed Woman"	Claude Demetrius (spelled Claude DeMetruis in the CD booklet)	January 15, 1958	1:53
4.	"Trouble"	Jerry Leiber and Mike Stoller	January 15, 1958	2:16
5.	"Dixieland Rock"	Aaron Schroeder and Rachel Frank	January 16, 1958	1:46

Side two
No.	Title	Writer(s)	Recording date	Length
1.	"Don't Ask Me Why"	Fred Wise and Ben Weisman	January 16, 1958	2:06
2.	"Lover Doll"	Sid Wayne and Abner Silver	January 16, 1958	2:09
3.	"Crawfish" (duet with Kitty White)	Fred Wise and Ben Weisman	January 15, 1958	1:48
4.	"Young Dreams"	Aaron Schroeder and Martin Kalmanoff	January 23, 1958	2:23
5.	"Steadfast, Loyal and True"	Jerry Leiber and Mike Stoller	February 11, 1958	1:15
6.	"New Orleans"	Sid Tepper and Roy C. Bennett	January 15, 1958	1:58

=== 1997 reissue bonus tracks ===
Tracks 1–11 consisted of the original album's tracks.
No.	Title	Writer(s)	Recording date	Length
12.	"King Creole" (alternate take 18)	Jerry Leiber and Mike Stoller	January 15, 1958	2:04
13.	"As Long as I Have You" (movie version take 4)	Fred Wise and Ben Weisman	January 23, 1958	1:24
14.	"Danny"	Fred Wise and Ben Weisman	February 11, 1958	1:51
15.	"Lover Doll" (undubbed)	Wayne Silver and Abner Silver	January 16, 1958	2:09
16.	"Steadfast, Loyal and True" (movie version alternate master)	Jerry Leiber and Mike Stoller	January 16, 1958	1:15
17.	"As Long as I Have You" (movie version take 8)	Fred Wise and Ben Weisman	January 15, 1958	1:24
18.	"King Creole" (alternate take 3)	Jerry Leiber and Mike Stoller	January 15, 1958	2:04

Track 14 ("Danny") was originally issued on the LP Elvis: A Legendary Performer Volume 3 (CPL1-3082) in December 1978.

== Personnel ==
- Elvis Presley – vocals, acoustic guitar
- The Jordanaires – backing vocals
- Scotty Moore – electric guitar
- Tiny Timbrell – acoustic guitar
- Bill Black – electric bass
- Neal Matthews – double bass
- Dudley Brooks – piano
- D.J. Fontana – drums
- Bernie Mattinson – percussion
- Kitty White – vocals on "Crawfish"
- Gordon Stoker – bongos
- Hoyt Hawkins – cymbals
- Ray Siegel – double bass
- Mahlon Clark – clarinet
- John Edward (Teddy) Buckner – trumpet
- Justin Gordon – saxophone
- Elmer Schneider – trombone
- Warren Smith – trombone

== Charts and certifications ==
=== Chart positions ===
Chart	Year	Peak position
UK Albums Chart	1958	1
US Billboard 200	1958	2

=== Certifications/sales ===
Country	Certification (thresholds)	Sales
United States	Gold	500,000
