= Jeff Alexander =

American conductor, arranger, and composer (1910–1989)

- Also known as: Myer Alexander
- Born: Myer Goodhue Alexander; July 2, 1910; Seattle, U.S.
- Died: December 23, 1989 (aged 79) Whidbey Island, Washington, U.S.
- Occupations: Conductor; arranger; composer
- Instrument: Piano

Jeff Alexander (born Myer Goodhue Alexander; July 2, 1910 – December 23, 1989) was an American conductor, arranger, and composer of film, radio and television scores.

== Early life ==
Born in Seattle, Washington, Alexander began performing in his teens as a singer and dancer in vaudeville productions. He then began playing piano and composing big band music.

== Radio ==
In 1937, he moved to New York City, where he arranged and composed music for radio programs, including Benny Goodman's Camel Caravan (as "Myer Alexander"), "The Lucky Strike Show" and "Amos 'n' Andy". He directed the orchestra for Songs of George Byron, Arthur's Place, Thirty Minutes to Play, The Bill Goodwin Show, and the Borden Show.

He directed the chorus for The Star Theater, Great Moments in Music and (billed as Myer Alexander) the Goodman program. His Goodman group was called "the world's only Swing Chorus".

== Career ==
=== Film ===
In 1947, he moved to Los Angeles and began writing film and, later, television scores. His first film project was the score for Shall We Dance, and he scored many of Elvis Presley's films, including Jailhouse Rock (1957), Kid Galahad (1962), Double Trouble (1967), Clambake (1967) and Speedway (1968). He also composed the scores to over 30 films, including The Tender Trap (1955), Ransom! (1956), The Wings of Eagles (1957), The Sheepman (1958), Party Girl (1958), Ask Any Girl (1959), The Mating Game (1959), The Gazebo (1959), All the Fine Young Cannibals (1960), The George Raft Story (1961), The Rounders (1965), Day of the Evil Gun (1968), Support Your Local Sheriff! (1969) and Dirty Dingus Magee (1970).

=== Television ===
Alexander's many television credits include being musical director for Please Don't Eat the Daisies and music for Family Affair, My Three Sons, The Mothers-In-Law, Julia, and Columbo. He wrote the song "Come Wander With Me" for an episode of The Twilight Zone in 1964; it was later used in the 2003 film The Brown Bunny.

=== Compositions ===
Although credited to Axel Stordahl, it was Alexander who arranged "The House I Live In" for Frank Sinatra, recorded in 1945. In 1956, Alexander contributed the tone poems "Yellow" and "Brown" to the album Frank Sinatra Conducts Tone Poems of Color. He also composed a symphony and other classical pieces.

== Other ==
In 1944, Alexander and Lyn Murray, along with business manager Eugene Loewenthal, formed Murray-Alexander Associates in New York City. The business provided vocal groups, orchestras, and arrangements.

Alexander was a founder of the organization Screen Composers of America.

== Death ==
Alexander died of cancer, aged 79, at his home in Whidbey Island, Washington on December 23, 1989. He was survived by his daughter, Jill.
