= The King and I (1956 film soundtrack) =

Soundtrack album by various artists
- Released: 1956
- Label: Capitol

Professional ratings
Review scores
Source	Rating
AllMusic	4/5 stars

The original soundtrack to the 1956 motion picture The King and I was released by Capitol Records in the same year.

== Background ==
Deborah Kerr (Anna)'s singing voice is dubbed by Marni Nixon, but her spoken voice can be heard. Yul Brynner (the King) sings himself. Rita Moreno (Tuptim) is dubbed by Leona Gordon.

== Chart performance ==
The album reached number one on Billboard's Best Selling Pop Albums chart in 1956 and continued charting for several years.

== Critical reception ==
In a retrospect review for AllMusic, William Ruhlmann praises both the film and its soundtrack, rating the soundtrack album four stars on a scale of five. He notes that the orchestrations were performed by the "large studio orchestra conducted by Alfred Newman" and were therefore expanded as compared to the 1951 Broadway cast album.

== CD releases ==
In 1993, the album was expanded for a CD release. In 2001, it was expanded again, receiving about 30 minutes of additional (mostly instrumental) material.

== Track listing ==
LP (Capitol W-740)

All lyrics are written by Oscar Hammerstein II; all music is composed by Richard Rodgers.

Side 1
No.	Title	Artist(s)	Length
1.	"Overture"	Orchestra	6:33
2.	"I Whistle a Happy Tune"	Anna, Louis and chorus	2:40
3.	"My Lord and Master"	Tuptim	2:08
4.	"Hello, Young Lovers"	Anna	3:25
5.	"The March of Siamese Children"	Orchestra	3:20
6.	"A Puzzlement"	The King	3:23

Side 2
No.	Title	Artist(s)	Length
1.	"Getting to Know You"	Anna and chorus	4:56
2.	"We Kiss in a Shadow"	Lun Tha and Tuptim	2:38
3.	"I Have Dreamed"	Tuptim and Lun Tha	2:20
4.	"Shall I Tell You What I Think of You?"	Anna	3:35
5.	"Something Wonderful"	Lady Thiang	3:08
6.	"Song of the King"	The King and Anna	1:27
7.	"Shall We Dance?"	Anna and the King	3:15
8.	"Something Wonderful" (Finale)	Orchestra and chorus	2:38

== Credits ==
- Only the actors are credited on the LP's labels and cover: Deborah Kerr (Anna), Yul Brynner (the King), Rita Moreno (Tuptim), Terry Saunders (Lady Thiang), Carlos Rivas (Lun Tha)
- Chorus and orchestra conducted by Alfred Newman

== Charts ==
Weekly charts

Charts (1956–1958)	Peak position
UK Albums (Official Charts)	1
US Billboard Best Selling Pop Albums	1

Yearly charts

Chart (1957)	Position
UK Albums (OOC)	1
