= South Pacific (soundtrack) =

Soundtrack album by Various artists
- Released: March 1958
- Recorded: 1958
- Genre: Show tunes
- Length: 45:58
- Label: RCA Victor
- Producer: P.O.

Professional ratings
Review scores
Source	Rating
AllMusic	4/5 stars

The Original Soundtrack to the film South Pacific was released by RCA Victor in 1958. The film was based on the 1949 musical South Pacific by Rodgers and Hammerstein. The composers had much say in this recording, with many of the songs performed by accomplished singers rather than the actors in the film. Mitzi Gaynor and Ray Walston (who had played Luther Billis in the original national tour and in the original London production) were the only two leading performers who did their own singing in the film (and on the soundtrack album). The roles of Emile DeBecque, Bloody Mary and Joe Cable were sung by Giorgio Tozzi, Muriel Smith (who had played the role in the original London production) and Bill Lee, respectively.

The Original Soundtrack LP was originally issued in the U.S. in mono only (both in standard and deluxe gatefold cover editions) in March 1958 when the movie premiered. The stereo edition (in a standard cover only) was among the first RCA Victor stereo LPs to be released in August 1958.

The album became a major success, reaching No.1 in both the US and the UK. In the US, the album stayed at No.1 for seven months - the fourth longest run ever. In the UK, the album remained in the top five for 27 consecutive weeks before reaching No.1 in November 1958. It stayed at the top for a record-breaking 115 weeks (the first 70 of these consecutively—including the whole year of 1959), and remained in the top five for 214 weeks. As of 2006, the album has sold 1,803,681 copies in the United Kingdom.

== Track listing ==
The songs on the soundtrack LP and CD are arranged in the order that they appear in the Broadway musical, not in the order in which they appear in the film. In the European Print of the film shown At The Dominion Theatre London the songs do appear in the order they appear in the film.

Side One

1. "South Pacific Overture" (3:03)
2. "Dites-moi" (1:19)
3. "A Cockeyed Optimist" (1:45)
4. "Twin Soliloquies" / "Some Enchanted Evening" (5:53)
5. "Bloody Mary" (1:57)
6. "My Girl Back Home" (1:42)
7. "There Is Nothin' Like a Dame" (3:50)
8. "Bali Ha'i" (3:41)

Side Two

1. "I'm Gonna Wash That Man Right Outa My Hair" (2:56)
2. "I'm in Love with a Wonderful Guy" (3:23)
3. "Younger Than Springtime" (4:59)
4. "Happy Talk" (3:46)
5. "Honey Bun" (1:48)
6. "You've Got to Be Carefully Taught" (1:15)
7. "This Nearly Was Mine" (2:12)
8. "Finale" (2:58)

== Chart positions ==
Chart	Year	Peak position
Billboard 200	1958	1
Billboard 200	1959	1
UK Albums Chart	1958	1
UK Albums Chart	1959	1
UK Albums Chart	1960	1
UK Albums Chart	1961	1

== Certifications and sales ==
Region	Certification	Certified units/sales
Norway	—	7,000
United Kingdom (BPI)	Platinum	1,803,681
United States (RIAA)	Gold	500,000^{^}
Summaries
Worldwide	—	8,000,000
^{^} Shipments figures based on certification alone.
