= The King of Rock 'n' Roll: The Complete 50's Masters =

The King of Rock 'n' Roll: The Complete 50s Masters

Box set by Elvis Presley
- Released: June 23, 1992
- Recorded: July 1953–September 1958
- Genres: Rock and roll; rockabilly; country
- Length: 5:39:26
- Label: RCA Records
- Producers: Ernst Mikael Jorgensen; Roger Semon

Elvis Presley chronology
The Lost Album (1990)	The King of Rock 'n' Roll: The Complete 50s Masters (1992)	From Nashville to Memphis: The Essential 60s Masters (1993)

Professional ratings
Review scores
Source	Rating
AllMusic	5/5 stars
Encyclopedia of Popular Music	5/5 stars
MusicHound	5/5 stars
Q	5/5 stars
The Rolling Stone Album Guide	5/5 stars
Rough Guides	5/5 stars

The King of Rock 'n' Roll: The Complete 50's Masters is a five-disc box set compilation of the complete known studio master recordings by American singer and musician Elvis Presley during the decade of the 1950s. Issued in 1992 by RCA Records, catalog number 66050-2, it was soon followed by similar box sets covering Presley's musical output in the 1960s and 1970s. This set's initial long-box release included a set of collectible stamps duplicating the record jackets from every Presley LP on RCA Victor, every single that had a picture sleeve, and most of his EP releases. The set includes a booklet with an extensive session list and discography, and a lengthy essay by Peter Guralnick. It peaked at #159 on the album chart and was certified a gold record on August 7, 1992, by the RIAA. Further certifications were for platinum on November 20, 1992, and for double platinum on July 30, 2002.

== Contents ==
The first four discs present the Elvis masters in chronological session order. Disc one commences with "My Happiness", a private test demo from the summer of 1953 at Sun Studio and the first recording ever made by Presley, and continues with the complete Sun Records masters through track 19. The remainder of disc one, and discs two through four, comprise the entirety of his output for RCA Victor during the decade. Disc four ends with an interview by Presley prior to his departure overseas to serve in the army in 1958, released on the EP Elvis Sails. Included as well are the officially released recordings on RCA Victor for each one of Elvis' four feature films of the 1950s: Love Me Tender, Loving You, Jailhouse Rock, and King Creole.

The fifth disc compiles rare outtakes and unreleased recordings, starting off with the companion acetate to "My Happiness" in an early version of "That's When Your Heartaches Begin". Tracks two and five are more acetates recorded by the standard Presley trio of Elvis, Scotty Moore on guitar, and Bill Black on bass, at an unknown location in Lubbock, Texas, during January 1955, presumably around the time when Buddy Holly converted to rock and roll after seeing Presley in concert. Tracks three and four present live recordings from the Municipal Auditorium in Shreveport, Louisiana in 1955, again with the trio. Tracks thirteen through sixteen present live recordings from the Frontier Hotel in Las Vegas, Nevada, in 1956, with the trio plus drummer D.J. Fontana. An outtake from the Million Dollar Quartet sessions appears on track nine, with the following personnel: Presley, Carl Perkins on guitar, his brother Clayton on bass, Jerry Lee Lewis on piano, and W.S. Holland on drums. Although Johnny Cash is billed as the fourth of the headlining quartet and his presence is corroborated by anecdotal evidence, aural evidence of his participation on record is difficult to discern. The remainder of disc five contains alternate takes of released masters.

Collecting every master recording made in the 1950s, The King of Rock 'n' Roll encapsulates the era for which Presley remains most revered, that of the young international phenomenon at the forefront of the rock and roll explosion. RCA issued three similarly configured box set companions for the subsequent decades of his career. The 1960s output was collected in two releases: From Nashville to Memphis, consisting of everything he did not record for film and television soundtracks; these were collected in Command Performances. Walk a Mile in My Shoes compiled his "essential" 1970s recordings.

Professional recordings were made at Sun Studio, RCA Studios in New York and Nashville, Radio Recorders in Hollywood, and at the studio soundstages of 20th Century Fox, Paramount, and MGM in Hollywood. The furlough recording session of June 10, 1958, took place in RCA's newly constructed studio in Nashville, where Presley would continue to record through 1971. Original recordings produced by Sam Phillips or Steve Sholes.

This compilation received a 1992 Grammy nomination for Best Historical Album, only to lose that award to the boxed set The Complete Capitol Recordings of The Nat King Cole Trio.

== Track listing ==
Chart positions for LPs and EPs from Billboard Top Pop Albums chart; peak positions for EPA 4114 and EPA 4325 from EP chart commenced October 1957; positions for singles from Billboard Pop Singles chart. Certain recordings derive from acetates or from primitive recording equipment, and are not of professional sound quality; these are marked with an asterisk.

=== Disc one ===
Track	Song title	Writer(s)	Time	Recorded	Release date	Catalogue	Original LP Issue	Chart peak
1.	My Happiness*	Betty Peterson Blasco and Borney Bergantine	2:31	1953-07-18	1990	2227-2	Elvis: The Great Performances	
2.	That's All Right	Arthur Crudup	1:55	1954-07-05	1954-07-19	Sun 209	For LP Fans Only	
3.	I Love You Because	Leon Payne	2:42	1954-07-05	1956-03-23	LPM 1254	Elvis Presley	#1
4.	Harbor Lights	Jimmy Kennedy and Hugh Williams	2:35	1954-07-05	1976-01-08	CPL1 1349	Elvis: A Legendary Performer; Vol. 2	#46
5.	Blue Moon of Kentucky	Bill Monroe	2:02	1954-07-05	1954-07-19	Sun 209b	A Date with Elvis	
6.	Blue Moon	Richard Rodgers and Lorenz Hart	2:31	1954-08-19	1956-03-23	LPM 1254	Elvis Presley	#1
7.	Tomorrow Night+	Sam Coslow and Hugh Williams	2:58	1954-09-10	1965-08-10	LSP 3450	Elvis for Everyone	#10
8.	I'll Never Let You Go (Little Darlin')	Jimmy Wakely	2:24	1954-09-10	1956-03-23	LPM 1254	Elvis Presley	#1
9.	I Don't Care If the Sun Don't Shine	Mack David	2:27	1954-09-10	1955-03-05	Sun 210b		
10.	Just Because	Sydney Robin, Bob Shelton, Joe Shelton	2:32	1954-09-10	1956-03-23	LPM 1254	Elvis Presley	#1
11.	Good Rockin' Tonight	Roy Brown	2:12	1954-09-10	1954-09-25	Sun 210		
12.	Milkcow Blues Boogie	Kokomo Arnold	2:38	1954-11-12	1954-12-28	Sun 215		
13.	You're a Heartbreaker	Jack Sallee	2:12	1954-11-12	1954-12-28	Sun 215b		#74
14.	Baby Let's Play House	Arthur Gunter	2:15	1955-02-05	1955-04-10	Sun 217		C&W #5
15.	I'm Left, You're Right, She's Gone	Stan Kesler and William E. Taylor	2:36	1955-03-05	1955-04-10	Sun 217b		
16.	Mystery Train	Herman Parker Jr. and Sam Phillips	2:24	1955-07-11	1955-08-06	Sun 223		
17.	I Forgot to Remember to Forget	Stan Kesler and Charlie Feathers	2:28	1955-07-11	1955-08-06	Sun 223b		C&W #1
18.	Tryin' to Get to You	Rose Marie McCoy and Charles Singleton	2:31	1955-07-11	1956-03-23	LPM 1254	Elvis Presley	#1
19.	When It Rains It Really Pours	William Emerson	2:01	1955-11-20	1983	6414-2	Elvis: A Legendary Performer Vol. 4	
20.	I Got a Woman	Ray Charles and Renald Richard	2:23	1956-01-10	1956-03-23	LPM 1254	Elvis Presley	#1
21.	Heartbreak Hotel	Mae Axton, Tommy Durden, Elvis Presley	2:08	1956-01-10	1956-01-27	47-6420		#1
22.	Money Honey	Jesse Stone	2:34	1956-01-10	1956-03-23	LPM 1254	Elvis Presley	#1
23.	I'm Counting on You	Don Robertson	2:24	1956-01-11	1956-03-23	LPM 1254	Elvis Presley	#1
24.	I Was the One	Aaron Schroeder, Claude DeMetrius, Hal Blair, Bill Peppers	2:33	1956-01-11	1956-01-27	47-6420b		#19
25.	Blue Suede Shoes	Carl Perkins	1:58	1956-01-30	1956-03-23	LPM 1254	Elvis Presley	#1
26.	My Baby Left Me	Arthur Crudup	2:11	1956-01-30	1956-05-04	47-6540b		#31
27.	One-Sided Love Affair	Bill Campbell	2:09	1956-01-30	1956-03-23	LPM 1254	Elvis Presley	#1
28.	So Glad You're Mine	Arthur Crudup	2:20	1956-01-30	1956-10-19	LPM 1382	Elvis	#1
29.	I'm Gonna Sit Right Down and Cry (Over You)	Howard Biggs and Joe Thomas	2:01	1956-01-31	1956-03-23	LPM 1254	Elvis Presley	#1
30.	Tutti Frutti	Dorothy LaBostrie and Richard Penniman	1:58	1956-01-31	1956-03-23	LPM 1254	Elvis Presley	#1

+ overdubs added prior to release on LSP 3450

=== Disc two ===
Track	Song title	Writer(s)	Time	Recorded	Release date	Catalogue	Original LP/EP Issue	Chart peak
1.	Lawdy Miss Clawdy	Lloyd Price	2:08	1956-02-03	1956-08-31	47-6642b		
2.	Shake, Rattle & Roll	Charles E. Calhoun	2:37	1956-02-03	1956-08-31	47-6642		
3.	I Want You, I Need You, I Love You	Lou Kosloff and George Mysels	2:40	1956-04-14	1956-05-04	47-6540		#1
4.	Hound Dog	Jerry Leiber and Mike Stoller	2:16	1956-07-02	1956-07-13	47-6604b	The Real Elvis	#1
5.	Don't Be Cruel	Otis Blackwell and Elvis Presley	2:02	1956-07-02	1956-07-13	47-6604	The Real Elvis	#1
6.	Any Way You Want Me (That's How I Will Be)	Cliff Owens and Aaron Schroeder	2:13	1956-07-02	1956-09-28	47-6643b		#20
7.	We're Gonna Move	Vera Matson and Elvis Presley	2:30	1956-08-24	1956–11	EPA 4006	Love Me Tender	#22
8.	Love Me Tender	Vera Matson and Elvis Presley	2:41	1956-08-24	1956-09-28	47-6643		#1
9.	Poor Boy	Vera Matson and Elvis Presley	2:13	1956-08-24	1956–11	EPA 4006	Love Me Tender	#22
10.	Let Me	Vera Matson and Elvis Presley	2:08	1956-08-24	1956–11	EPA 4006	Love Me Tender	#22
11.	Playing for Keeps	Stan Kesler	2:50	1956-09-01	1957-01-04	47-6800b		#21
12.	Love Me	Jerry Leiber and Mike Stoller	2:43	1956-09-01	1956-10-19	LPM 1382	Elvis	#1
13.	Paralyzed	Otis Blackwell and Elvis Presley	2:23	1956-09-02	1956-10-19	LPM 1382	Elvis	#1
14.	How Do You Think I Feel	Webb Pierce and Wiley Walker	2:10	1956-09-01	1956-10-19	LPM 1382	Elvis	#1
15.	How's the World Treating You?	Chet Atkins and Boudleaux Bryant	2:23	1956-09-01	1956-10-19	LPM 1382	Elvis	#1
16.	When My Blue Moon Turns to Gold Again	Gene Sullivan and Wiley Walker	2:20	1956-09-02	1956-10-19	LPM 1382	Elvis	#1
17.	Long Tall Sally	Robert Blackwell, Enotris Johnson, Richard Penniman	1:51	1956-09-02	1956-10-19	LPM 1382	Elvis	#1
18.	Old Shep	Red Foley and Arthur Williams	4:10	1956-09-02	1956-10-19	LPM 1382	Elvis	#1
19.	Too Much	Lee Rosenberg and Bernard Weinman	2:31	1956-09-02	1957-01-04	47-6800		#1
20.	Anyplace Is Paradise	Joe Thomas	2:26	1956-09-02	1956-10-19	LPM 1382	Elvis	#1
21.	Ready Teddy	Robert Blackwell and John Marascalco	1:56	1956-09-03	1956-10-19	LPM 1382	Elvis	#1
22.	First in Line	Aaron Schroeder and Ben Weisman	3:22	1956-09-03	1956-10-19	LPM 1382	Elvis	#1
23.	Rip It Up	Robert Blackwell and John Marascalco	1:53	1956-09-03	1956-10-19	LPM 1382	Elvis	#1
24.	I Believe	Ervin Drake, Irvin Graham, Jimmy Shirl, Al Stillman	2:05	1957-01-12	1957–04	EPA 4054	Peace in the Valley	#3
25.	Tell Me Why	Titus Turner	2:05	1957-01-12	1965-12-03	47-8740		#33
26.	Got a Lot o' Livin' to Do	Aaron Schroeder and Ben Weisman	2:31	1957-01-12	1957-07-01	LPM 1515	Loving You	#1
27.	All Shook Up	Otis Blackwell and Elvis Presley	1:56	1957-01-12	1957-03-22	47-6870		#1
28.	Mean Woman Blues	Claude DeMetrius	2:15	1957-01-13	1957-07-01	LPM 1515	Loving You	#1
29.	(There'll Be) Peace in the Valley (For Me)	Thomas A. Dorsey	3:22	1957-01-13	1957–04	EPA 4054	Peace in the Valley	#3

=== Disc three ===
Track	Song title	Writer(s)	Time	Recorded	Release date	Catalogue	Original LP/EP Issue	Chart peak
1.	That's When Your Heartaches Begin	Fred Fisher, Billy Hill, William Raskin	3:20	1957-01-13	1957-03-22	47-6870b		#58
2.	Take My Hand, Precious Lord	Thomas A. Dorsey	3:16	1957-01-13	1957–04	EPA 4054	Peace in the Valley	#3
3.	It Is No Secret (What God Can Do)	Stuart Hamblen	3:53	1957-01-19	1957–04	EPA 4054	Peace in the Valley	#3
4.	Blueberry Hill	Vincent Rose, Al Lewis, Larry Stock	2:39	1957-01-19	1957–04	EPA 4041	Just For You	#16
5.	Have I Told You Lately That I Love You	Scotty Greene Wiseman	2:31	1957-01-19	1957–04	EPA 4041	Just For You	#16
6.	Is It So Strange	Faron Young	2:28	1957-01-19	1957–04	EPA 4041	Just For You	#16
7.	Party	Jessie Mae Robinson	1:26	1957–01	1957-07-01	LPM 1515	Loving You	#1
8.	Lonesome Cowboy	Sid Tepper and Roy C. Bennett	3:07	1957-01-15	1957-07-01	LPM 1515	Loving You	#1
9.	Hot Dog	Jerry Leiber and Mike Stoller	1:17	1957-01-18	1957-07-01	LPM 1515	Loving You	#1
10.	One Night of Sin	Dave Bartholomew, Pearl King, Anita Steiman	2:35	1957-01-24	1983	CPL1 4848	Elvis: A Legendary Performer Vol. 4	
11.	(Let Me Be Your) Teddy Bear	Kal Mann and Bernie Lowe	1:45	1957-01-24	1957-06-11	47-7000	Loving You	#1
12.	Don't Leave Me Now	Aaron Schroeder and Ben Weisman	1:58	1957-02-23	1957-07-01		Loving You	#1
13.	I Beg of You	Rose Marie McCoy and Kelly Owens	1:50	1957-02-23	1958-01-07	47-7150b		#8
14.	One Night	Dave Bartholomew, Pearl King, Anita Steiman	2:29	1957-02-23	1958-10-21	47-7410		#4
15.	True Love	Cole Porter	2:05	1957-02-23	1957-07-01	LPM 1515	Loving You	#1
16.	I Need You So	Ivory Joe Hunter	2:37	1957-02-23	1957–04	EPA 4041	Just For You	#16
17.	Loving You	Jerry Leiber and Mike Stoller	2:12	1957-02-24	1957-06-11	47-7000b		#20
18.	When It Rains It Really Pours	William Emerson	1:47	1957-02-24	1965-08-10	LSP 3450	Elvis for Everyone	#10
19.	Jailhouse Rock	Jerry Leiber and Mike Stoller	2:26	1957-04-30	1957-09-24	47-7035		#1
20.	Young and Beautiful	Aaron Schroeder and Abner Silver	2:02	1957-04-30	1957–10	EPA 4114	Jailhouse Rock	#1
21.	I Want to Be Free	Jerry Leiber and Mike Stoller	2:12	1957-04-30	1957–10	EPA 4114	Jailhouse Rock	#1
22.	(You're So Square) Baby I Don't Care	Jerry Leiber and Mike Stoller	1:51	1957-04-30	1957–10	EPA 4114	Jailhouse Rock	#1
23.	Don't Leave Me Now	Aaron Schroeder and Ben Weisman	2:05	1957-04-30	1957–10	EPA 4114	Jailhouse Rock	#1
24.	Blue Christmas	Billy Hayes and Jay Johnson	2:07	1957-09-05	1957-10-15	LOC 1035	Elvis' Christmas Album	#1
25.	White Christmas	Irving Berlin	2:23	1957-09-06	1957-10-15	LOC 1035	Elvis' Christmas Album	#1
26.	Here Comes Santa Claus	Gene Autry and Oakley Haldeman	1:54	1957-09-06	1957-10-15	LOC 1035	Elvis' Christmas Album	#1
27.	Silent Night	Joseph Mohr and Franz Gruber	2:23	1957-09-06	1957-10-15	LOC 1035	Elvis' Christmas Album	#1
28.	O Little Town of Bethlehem	Phillips Brooks and Lewis H. Redner	2:35	1957-09-07	1957-10-15	LOC 1035	Elvis' Christmas Album	#1
29.	Santa Bring My Baby Back (To Me)	Aaron Schroeder and Claude Demetrius	1:54	1957-09-07	1957-10-15	LOC 1035	Elvis' Christmas Album	#1
30.	Santa Claus Is Back In Town	Jerry Leiber and Mike Stoller	2:22	1957-09-07	1957-10-15	LOC 1035	Elvis' Christmas Album	#1
31.	I'll Be Home for Christmas	Buck Ram, Kim Gannon, Walter Kent	1:53	1957-09-07	1957-10-15	LOC 1035	Elvis' Christmas Album	#1

=== Disc four ===
Track	Song title	Writer(s)	Time	Recorded	Release date	Catalogue	Original LP/EP Issue	Chart peak
1.	Treat Me Nice	Jerry Leiber and Mike Stoller	2:10	1957-09-05	1957-09-24	47-7035b		#18
2.	My Wish Came True	Ivory Joe Hunter	2:33	1957-09-06	1959-06-23	47-7600b		#12
3.	Don't	Jerry Leiber and Mike Stoller	2:48	1957-09-06	1958-01-07	47-7150		#1
4.	Danny	Fred Wise and Ben Weisman	1:51	1958-02-11	1978–12	CP1 3082	Elvis: A Legendary Performer Vol. 3	#113
5.	Hard Headed Woman	Claude DeMetrius	1:53	1958-01-15	1958-06-10	47-7280		#1
6.	Trouble	Jerry Leiber and Mike Stoller	2:16	1958-01-15	1958-09-19	LPM 1884	King Creole	#2
7.	New Orleans	Sid Tepper and Roy C. Bennett	1:58	1958-01-15	1958-09-19	LPM 1884	King Creole	#2
8.	Crawfish	Fred Wise and Ben Weisman	1:38	1958-01-15	1958-09-19	LPM 1884	King Creole	#2
9.	Dixieland Rock	Aaron Schroeder and Rachel Frank	1:46	1958-01-16	1958-09-19	LPM 1884	King Creole	#2
10.	Lover Doll	Sid Wayne and Abner Silver	2:09	1958-01-16	1958-09-19	LPM 1884	King Creole	#2
11.	Don't Ask Me Why	Fred Wise and Ben Weisman	2:06	1958-01-16	1958-06-10	47-7280b		#25
12.	As Long As I Have You	Fred Wise and Ben Weisman	1:50	1958-01-16	1958-09-19	LPM 1884	King Creole	#2
13.	King Creole	Jerry Leiber and Mike Stoller	2:08	1958-01-23	1958-09-19	LPM 1884	King Creole	#2
14.	Young Dreams	Aaron Schroeder and Martin Kalmanoff	2:23	1958-01-23	1958-09-19	LPM 1884	King Creole	#2
15.	Steadfast, Loyal And True	Jerry Leiber and Mike Stoller	1:15	1958-02-11	1958-09-19	LPM 1884	King Creole	#2
16.	Doncha' Think It's Time	Luther Dixon and Clyde Otis	1:54	1958-02-01	1958-04-01	47-7240b		#15
17.	Your Cheatin' Heart	Hank Williams	2:24	1958-02-01	1965-08-10	LSP 3450	Elvis for Everyone	#10
18.	Wear My Ring Around Your Neck	Bert Carroll and Russell Moody	2:13	1958-02-01	1958-04-01	47-7240		#2
19.	I Need Your Love Tonight	Bix Reichner and Sid Wayne	2:04	1958-06-10	1959-03-10	47-7506b		#4
20.	A Big Hunk O' Love	Aaron Schroeder and Sidney Wyche	2:12	1958-06-10	1959-06-23	47-7600		#1
21.	Ain't That Loving You Baby	Ivory Joe Hunter and Clyde Otis	2:22	1958-06-10	1964-09-22	47-8440		#16
22.	(Now and Then There's) A Fool Such as I	Bill Trader	2:36	1958-06-10	1959-03-10	47-7506		#2
23.	I Got Stung	David Hill and Aaron Schroeder	1:49	1958-06-11	1958-10-21	47-7410		#8
24.	Expanded Interview Segment		12:34	1958-09-22	1958–12	EPA 4325	Elvis Sails	#2

=== Disc five: Rare and Rockin' ===
Track	Song title	Writer(s)	Time	Recorded	Release date	Catalogue	Original LP Issue	Chart peak
1.	That's When Your Heartaches Begin*	Fred Fisher, Billy Hill, William Raskin	3:20	1953-07-18			previously unreleased	
2.	Fool, Fool, Fool*	Nugetre	1:51	1955-01-06			previously unreleased	
3.	Tweedle Dee* (live)	Winfield Scott and LaVern Baker	2:07	1955-04-30	1984–03	RCA 89387	Elvis: The First Live Recordings	#163
4.	Maybellene* (live)	Chuck Berry	1:58	1955-08-20	1984–03	RCA 89387	Elvis: The First Live Recordings	#163
5.	Shake, Rattle & Roll*	Charles E. Calhoun	2:16	1955-01-06			previously unreleased	
6.	Blue Moon of Kentucky (alternate)	Bill Monroe	1:03	1954-07-05	1987	RCA 6414-2	The Complete Sun Sessions	
7.	Blue Moon (alternate)	Richard Rodgers and Lorenz Hart	2:55	1954-08-19			previously unreleased	
8.	I'm Left, You're Right, She's Gone (slow version)	Stan Kesler and William E. Taylor	2:40	1955-03-05	1987	RCA 6414-2	The Complete Sun Sessions	
9.	Reconsider Baby	Lowell Fulson	2:53	1956-12-04			previously unreleased	
10.	Lawdy Miss Clawdy (alternate)	Lloyd Price	2:07	1956-02-03			previously unreleased	
11.	Shake, Rattle & Roll (alternate)	Charles E. Calhoun	2:25	1956-02-03			previously unreleased	
12.	I Want You, I Need You, I Love You (alternate)	Maurice Mysels, Ira Kosloff and Tom Hamilton	2:40	1956-04-14			previously unreleased	
13.	Heartbreak Hotel* (live)	Mae Borden Axton, Tommy Durden, Elvis Presley	2:54	1956-05-06	1980–08	CP8 3699	Elvis Aron Presley	#27
14.	Long Tall Sally* (live)	Robert Blackwell, Enotris Johnson, Richard Penniman	2:15	1956-05-06	1980–08	CP8 3699	Elvis Aron Presley	#27
15.	Blue Suede Shoes* (live)	Carl Perkins	4:59	1956-05-06	1980–08	CP8 3699	Elvis Aron Presley	#27
16.	Money Honey* (live)	Jesse Stone	2:34	1956-05-06	1980–08	CP8 3699	Elvis Aron Presley	#27
17.	We're Gonna Move (alternate)	Vera Matson and Elvis Presley	2:30	1956-08-24			previously unreleased	
18.	Old Shep (alternate)	Red Foley	3:53	1956-09-02			previously unreleased	
19.	I Beg of You (alternate)	Rosemarie McCoy and Kelly Owens	1:51	1957-01-13			previously unreleased	
20.	Loving You (slow version)	Jerry Leiber and Mike Stoller	1:48	1957-02-14			previously unreleased	
21.	Loving You (uptempo version)	Jerry Leiber and Mike Stoller	1:24	1957-02-14			previously unreleased	
22.	Young And Beautiful (alternate)	Aaron Schroeder and Abner Silver	1:09	1957-04-30			previously unreleased	
23.	I Want to Be Free (alternate)	Jerry Leiber and Mike Stoller	2:06	1957-04-30			previously unreleased	
24.	King Creole (alternate)	Jerry Leiber and Mike Stoller	2:04	1958-01-15	1991–01	2229-2-R	Essential Elvis Vol. 3	
25.	As Long as I Have You (alternate)	Fred Wise and Ben Weisman	1:24	1958-01-16	1991–01	2229-2-R	Essential Elvis Vol. 3	
26.	Ain't That Loving You Baby (fast version)	Ivory Joe Hunter and Clyde Otis	1:48	1958-06-10	1991–01	2229-2-R	Essential Elvis Vol. 3	

== Personnel ==
- Elvis Presley – vocal, guitar, piano, percussion, bass guitar (on (You're So Square) Baby I Don't Care)
- Scotty Moore – lead guitar except "My Happiness", "We're Gonna Move", "Love Me Tender", "Poor Boy", "Let Me", "That's When Your Heartaches Begin", "I Need Your Love Tonight", "A Big Hunk O' Love", "Ain't That Loving You Baby", "(Now and Then There's) A Fool Such as I", "I Got Stung", and "Ain't That Loving You Baby (Fast Version)"
- Chet Atkins – acoustic rhythm guitar
- Hank Garland – lead guitar on "I Need Your Love Tonight", "A Big Hunk O' Love", "Ain't That Loving You Baby", "(Now and Then There's) A Fool Such as I", "I Got Stung", and "Ain't That Loving You Baby (Fast Version)"
- Tiny Timbrell – acoustic rhythm guitar, possible acoustic rhythm/lead guitar on "Steadfast, Loyal, and True"
- Floyd Cramer – piano
- Shorty Long – piano
- Dudley Brooks – piano
- Mike Stoller – piano
- Marvin Hughes – piano
- Bill Black – double bass except "My Happiness", "We're Gonna Move", "Love Me Tender", "Poor Boy", "Let Me", "That's When Your Heartaches Begin", "I Need Your Love Tonight", "A Big Hunk O' Love", "Ain't That Loving You Baby", "(Now and Then There's) A Fool Such as I", "I Got Stung", and "Ain't That Loving You Baby (Fast Version)"
- Bob Moore – double bass on "I Need Your Love Tonight", "A Big Hunk O' Love", "Ain't That Loving You Baby", "(Now and Then There's) A Fool Such as I", "I Got Stung", and "Ain't That Loving You Baby (Fast Version)"
- D.J. Fontana – drums
- Jimmie Lott – drums on "I'm Left, You're Right, She's Gone"
- Johnny Bernero – drums on "Tryin' to Get to You"
- Millie Kirkham – backing vocals
- Ben Speer, Brock Speer – backing vocals on "I'm Counting On You", "I Was the One", and "I Want You, I Need You, I Love You"

The Jordanaires

- Gordon Stoker – piano, backing vocals
- Hoyt Hawkins – backing vocals, organ
- Neal Matthews – backing vocals, bass, guitar
- Hugh Jarrett – backing vocals
- Ray Walker – backing vocals

Love Me Tender Sessions

- Vito Mumolo – guitar on "Love Me Tender", "Poor Boy", "We're Gonna Move", and "Let Me"
- Myer Rubin – double bass on "Love Me Tender", "Poor Boy", "We're Gonna Move", and "Let Me"
- Richard Cornell – drums on "Love Me Tender", "Poor Boy", "We're Gonna Move", and "Let Me"
- Luther "Red" Roundtree – banjo on "Love Me Tender", "Poor Boy", "We're Gonna Move", and Let Me"
- Dominic Frontieri – accordion on "Love Me Tender", "Poor Boy", "We're Gonna Move", and "Let Me"
- Ken Darby Trio – backing vocals on "Love Me Tender", "Poor Boy", "We're Gonna Move", and "Let Me"

Million Dollar Quartet

- Carl Perkins – lead guitar and vocals on "Reconsider Baby"
- Jerry Lee Lewis – piano on "Reconsider Baby"
- Clayton Perkins – bass on "Reconsider Baby"
- W.S. Holland – drums on "Reconsider Baby"
- Johnny Cash – possible vocals on "Reconsider Baby"

== Charts ==
Chart performance for The King of Rock 'n' Roll: The Complete 50's Masters
Chart (1992)	Peak position
Australian Albums (ARIA)	52
US Billboard 200	159
