= Elvis at Sun =

Compilation album by Elvis Presley
- Released: June 22, 2004
- Recorded: July 1954–November 1955
- Genres: Rock and roll, rockabilly, country
- Length: 47:40
- Label: RCA 61205-2
- Producer: Sam Phillips

Elvis Presley chronology
2nd to None (2003)	Elvis at Sun (2004)	Love, Elvis (2005)

Professional ratings
Review scores
Source	Rating
Allmusic	4.5/5 stars

Elvis at Sun is a compact disc compilation of Elvis Presley's studio recordings at Sun Studio from 1954 to 1955, released in June 2004, BMG Heritage 61205. This set features master recordings made by Presley and his accompanists, Scotty Moore and Bill Black, occasionally augmented by other musicians, prior to his arrival on RCA Records in early 1956.

== Contents ==
The tapes for the Sun versions of "I Got A Woman" and "Satisfied" were lost. The former would be recorded for Presley during his first RCA session. All of the studio recordings were produced by Sam Phillips, the owner of Sun Studio in Memphis, Tennessee. Phillips released Presley's recording contract to RCA for the substantial sum, in 1955 dollars, of $35,000. This gave RCA the rights to all of Presley's masters recorded at Sun.

The disc contains a slightly different track list and running order than previous issues of the Sun material, such as the Sunrise double-disc, with the shorter version of "When It Rains It Really Pours" from the fifties box, and an alternate of "I Love You Because." It still presents all eighteen Sun titles from the singer's stay at the label.

"Elvis At Sun" also was released in the vinyl LP configuration.

== Importance ==
The set includes "That's All Right (Mama)", one of candidates for being "the first rock and roll record". Elvis' entire period at Sun is one of the seminal events in the birth of rock and roll, specifically also the beginning of the subgenre known as rockabilly. In 2001, VH1 named its parent album - The Sun Sessions - the 21st greatest album of all time; on 2003, Rolling Stone listed it #11 on its the 500 greatest albums of all time. Two tracks from the Presley's Sun sessions were included in The Rock and Roll Hall of Fame's 500 Songs that Shaped Rock and Roll: "Mystery Train," and "That's All Right."

In 2002, given their importance in the development of American popular music, The Sun Sessions were chosen, by the National Recording Registry of the Library of Congress, to be kept as a bequeathal to posterity.

For more detailed information on the recording sessions, see Elvis Presley's Sun recordings.

== Personnel ==
- Elvis Presley – vocals and guitar on all tracks except for track 18
- Elvis Presley vocals and piano, track 18
- Scotty Moore – guitar on all tracks
- Bill Black – bass on all tracks
- Jimmie Lott – drums on track 8
- Johnny Bernero – drums on tracks 16, 18, 19

== Track listing ==
Chart positions for LPs and EPs from Billboard Top Pop Albums chart; positions for singles from Billboard Pop Singles chart except as indicated.

Track	Song title	Writer(s)	Time	Recorded	Release date	Original LP Issue	Catalogue	Chart peak
1.	"Harbor Lights"	Jimmy Kennedy and Hugh Williams	2:37	1954-07-05	1959-07-24	A Date with Elvis	LPM 2011	#46
2.	"I Love You Because" alternate	Leon Payne	3:29	1954-07-05	1987	The Complete Sun Sessions	RCA 6414-2	
3.	"That's All Right"	Arthur Crudup	1:57	1954-07-05	1954-07-19	For LP Fans Only	Sun 209	
4.	"Blue Moon of Kentucky"	Bill Monroe	2:04	1954-07-05	1954-07-19	A Date with Elvis	Sun 209b	
5.	"Blue Moon"	Richard Rodgers and Lorenz Hart	2:44	1954-08-19	1956-03-23	Elvis Presley	LPM 1254	#1
6.	"Tomorrow Night"	Sam Coslow and Will Grosz	3:00	1954-09-10	1965-08-10	Elvis for Everyone	LSP 3450	#10
7.	"I'll Never Let You Go (Lil' Darlin')"	Jimmy Wakely	2:25	1954-09-10	1956-03-23	Elvis Presley	LPM 1254	#1
8.	"Just Because"	Sydney Robin, Bob Shelton, Joe Shelton	2:33	1954-09-10	1956-03-23	Elvis Presley	LPM 1254	#1
9.	"Good Rockin' Tonight"	Roy Brown	2:13	1954-09-10	1954-09-25	A Date with Elvis	Sun 210	
10.	"I Don't Care If the Sun Don't Shine"	Mack David	2:20	1954-09-10	1954-09-25	The Sun Sessions	Sun 210b	
11.	"Milkcow Blues Boogie"	Kokomo Arnold	2:37	1954-11/12?	1954-12-28	A Date with Elvis	Sun 215	
12.	"You're a Heartbreaker"	Jack Sallee	2:12	1954-11/12?	1954-12-28	For LP Fans Only	Sun 215b	#74
13.	"I'm Left, You're Right, She's Gone" (slow version)	Stan Kesler and William E. Taylor	2:41	1955-03-05	1987	The Complete Sun Sessions	RCA 6414-2	
14.	"I'm Left, You're Right, She's Gone"	Stan Kesler and William E. Taylor	2:37	1955-03-05	1955-04-10	For LP Fans Only	Sun 217b	
15.	"Baby Let's Play House"	Arthur Gunter	2:17	1955-02-05	1955-04-10	A Date with Elvis	Sun 217	C&W #5
16.	"I Forgot to Remember to Forget"	Stan Kesler and Charlie Feathers	2:30	1955-07-11	1955-08-06	A Date with Elvis	Sun 223	C&W #1
17.	"Mystery Train"	Junior Parker and Sam Phillips	2:29	1955-07-11	1955-08-06	For LP Fans Only	Sun 223b	
18.	"Trying to Get to You"	Rose Marie McCoy and Charles Singleton	2:33	1955-07-11	1956-03-23	Elvis Presley	LPM 1254	#1
19.	"When It Rains It Really Pours"	William Emerson	2:00	1955-11-20	1992-06-23	The Complete 50s Masters	RCA 66050-2	#159

== Charts ==
Chart (2004)	Peak position
Australian Albums (ARIA)	69
Dutch Albums (Album Top 100)	88
US Top Country Albums (Billboard)	37
