= List of songs recorded by Elvis Presley on the Sun label =

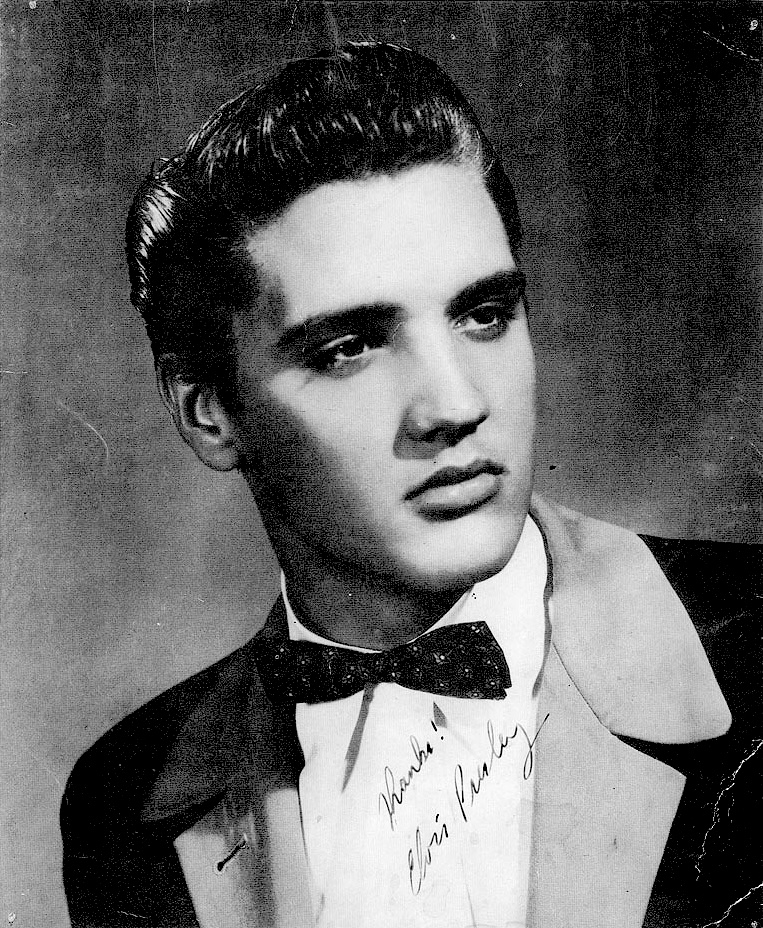
Presley in a Sun Records promotional photograph, 1954

Elvis Presley recorded at least 24 songs at Sun Studio in Memphis, Tennessee, between 1953 and 1955. The recordings reflect the wide variety of music that could be heard in Memphis at the time: blues, rhythm & blues, gospel, country & western, hillbilly, rockabilly and bluegrass. Because of the recordings' historical significance in the foundation of rock and roll music, they were inducted into the U.S. Congress's National Recording Registry in 2002.

Of the 24 known taped songs, 22 survive. Ten were released by Sun as Presley's first five singles between 1954 and 1955. With the exception of the first four songs, which were demos recorded at Presley's expense, all of the songs were produced by Sam Phillips and featured Scotty Moore on guitar and Bill Black on bass.

A year after Presley joined RCA Victor, he had a spontaneous informal session with Carl Perkins, Johnny Cash, and Jerry Lee Lewis when visiting the Sun studio. This meeting was recorded on December 4, 1956, and dubbed the Million Dollar Quartet by the local newspaper the next day. These sessions are not generally included when reference is made to "Elvis's Sun Sessions", however.

== History ==
=== 1953–1954: First acetate recordings ===
On July 18, 1953, Presley first went to the Memphis Recording Service at the Sun Record Company, now commonly known as Sun Studio. He paid $3.98 to record the first of two double-sided demo acetates, "My Happiness" and "That's When Your Heartaches Begin". Presley reportedly gave the acetate to his mother as a much-belated extra birthday present, although many biographers suggest that Presley simply wanted to get noticed by Sun owner Sam Phillips. These suggestions are strengthened by the fact that the Presleys did not own a record player at the time. Presley could have wanted both: another gift for his mother and an opportunity to be discovered. That one-off acetate has since been valued at $500,000 by Record Collector magazine. Returning to Sun Studios on January 4, 1954, he recorded a second acetate, "I'll Never Stand in Your Way" / "It Wouldn't Be the Same Without You".

Phillips had already cut the first records by blues artists such as Howlin' Wolf and Junior Parker. He thought a combination of black blues and boogie-woogie music would be very popular among white people, if presented in the right way. In the spring, Presley auditioned for amateur gospel quartet The Songfellows as one of the group was leaving and they were seeking a replacement. However, following Presley's audition, the original group member decided to stay. In May, Presley auditioned at the Hi-Hat in Memphis as a vocalist for a band. Eddie Bond, the owner of the Hi-Hat, turned him down.

When Phillips acquired a demo recording of "Without You" and was unable to identify the vocalist, his assistant, Marion Keisker, reminded him about the young truck driver. She called him on May 26, 1954. Presley was not able to do justice to the song (the original acetate of the song that Phillips presented to Presley resides in the Memphis State University collection), but Phillips asked him to perform some of the many other songs he knew. After running through a few songs, Presley expressed an interest in finding a band to play with, and Phillips invited local Western swing musicians Winfield "Scotty" Moore (electric guitar) and Bill Black (slap bass) to audition Presley. They did so on Sunday, July 4, 1954, at Moore's house. Neither musician was overly impressed, but they agreed a studio session would be useful to explore his potential.

=== 1954–1955: "That's All Right (Mama)" and local breakthrough ===
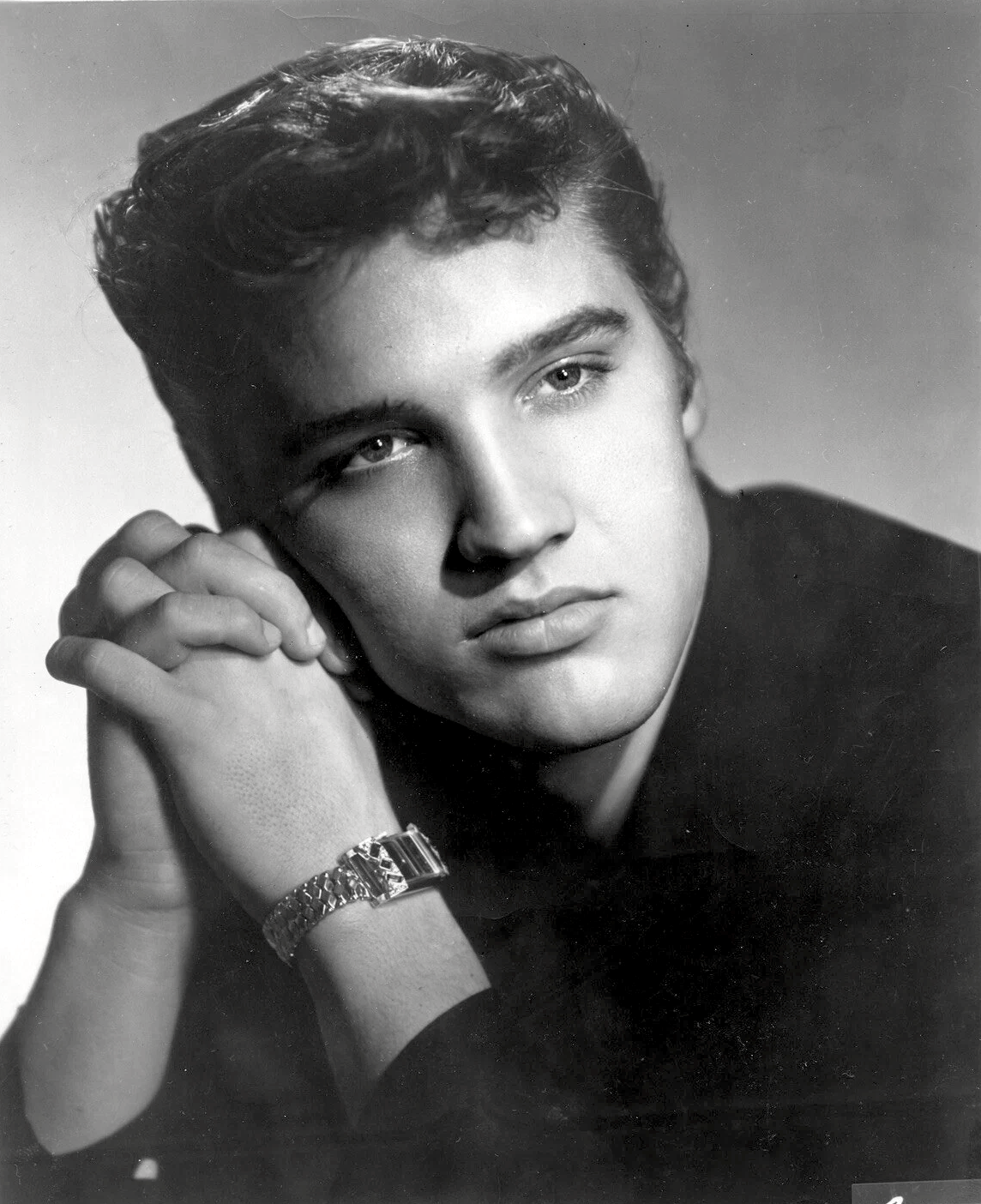
Promotional portrait of Presley in 1955

On July 5, 1954, the trio met at Sun studios to rehearse and record a handful of songs. According to Moore, the first song they recorded was "I Love You Because", but, after a few other country-oriented songs that weren't all that impressive, they decided to take a break. During the break, Presley began "acting the fool" with Arthur Crudup's "That's All Right (Mama)", a blues song. When the other two musicians joined in, Phillips got them to restart and began taping. This was the bright, upbeat sound he had been looking for. Black remarked, "Damn. Get that on the radio and they'll run us out of town." The group recorded four songs during that session, including bluegrass musician Bill Monroe's "Blue Moon of Kentucky", which he had written and recorded as a slow waltz. Sources credit Bill Black with initiating the song, with Presley and Moore joining in. They ended up with a fast version of the song in 4/4 time. After an early take, Phillips can be heard on tape saying: "Fine, man. Hell, that's different—that's a pop song now, nearly 'bout."

To gauge professional and public reaction, Phillips took several acetates of the session to DJ Dewey Phillips (no relation) of Memphis radio station WHBQ's Red, Hot and Blue show. "That's All Right" subsequently received its first play on July 8, 1954. A week later, Sun had received some 6,000 advanced orders for "That's All Right" / "Blue Moon of Kentucky," which was released on July 19, 1954. From August 18 through December 8, "Blue Moon of Kentucky" was consistently higher on the charts, and then both sides began to chart across the South.

After several performances with other bands, Presley arranged for Moore and Black to be his regular back-up group, giving them each 25% of the takings. Moore and Black were originally members of their own band, The Starlight Wranglers, but after the success of "That's All Right", jealousy within the group forced them to split.

Over the next 15 months, the trio would release five singles, tour extensively across the South, and appear regularly on the Louisiana Hayride; it was the biggest rival to the Grand Ole Opry at the time. They had originally auditioned for the Opry in October 1954, but they failed to impress the people in charge, or the audience, and were not invited back. Several biographers cite Jim Denny, talent agent at the Opry, as the man who told Presley that he should "go back to driving a truck".

=== 1955–1956: Departure from Sun and the Million Dollar Quartet ===
The trio would record at Sun together until November 1955, when RCA Victor purchased Presley's Sun contract from Phillips for $40,000; it was, at the time, the highest sum ever paid for a recording contract. Sun's rights to press Presley's recordings expired on January 1, 1956; RCA Victor then issued Presley's first five Sun singles nationally. Presley's first single for RCA Victor, "Heartbreak Hotel" was recorded in January, 1956. Although no longer under contract to Sun, Presley returned to the studios frequently over the next few months, visiting with Phillips and meeting many of the label's new artists.

On December 4, 1956, Presley visited Sun studios during a Carl Perkins recording session, which also featured a young Jerry Lee Lewis on piano, and a new artist named Johnny Cash looking on. During a break in recording, Presley sat at the piano and began to sing along with Perkins, Lewis and Cash. Phillips kept his tape recorder running during the impromptu jam session and seeing an opportunity to promote another of his new acts, he arranged for a reporter to cover the event. The recordings would eventually surface later as "the Million Dollar Quartet".

During Presley's tenure at Sun Records, he recorded two demo recordings in Lubbock, Texas: "Fool, Fool, Fool" and "Shake, Rattle and Roll", which were released for the first time by RCA Victor in the 1990s. These are not considered Sun recordings.

== Songs recorded ==
Listed are the 24 titles from 1953 to 1955, ordered by their recording date. A take is any later version; the best take would be used to create a master to be issued.

=== "My Happiness" ===
"My Happiness" was recorded as a self-financed demo.

The original is by Borney Bergantine (the melody existed in 1933), and Betty Peterson Blasco; published in 1948.

Recorded: 15 August 1953

=== "That's When Your Heartaches Begin" ===
"That's When Your Heartaches Begin" was recorded as a self-financed demo.

The original is from 1937 by William Raskin, Fred Fisher and George Brown, and recorded by The Ink Spots in 1941.

Recorded: 15 August 1953

=== "I'll Never Stand in Your Way" ===
"I'll Never Stand in Your Way," by Hy Heath, is another self-financed recording.

Recorded: January 4, 1954

=== "It Wouldn't Be the Same Without You" ===
"It Wouldn't Be the Same Without You" is the fourth and final self-financed demo Presley recorded. The song is by Fred Rose.

Recorded: January 4, 1954

=== "I Love You Because" ===
"I Love You Because" is a song by Leon Payne, original probably 1949, Capitol; Eddie Fisher (1950, RCA Victor)

Recorded: July 5, 1954 (session 1)

=== "That's All Right" ===
"That's All Right (Mama)" was written and recorded by Arthur "Big Boy" Crudup (1947, RCA Victor). Crudup's original title is "That's All Right (Mama)"; on the Sun label, and many later releases, '(Mama)' is omitted: "That's All Right".

Recorded: July 5, 1954 (session 1)

Presley's recording of "That's All Right (Mama)" is mentioned as one of the beginnings of rock and roll, though the first rock and roll records predate it.

=== "Harbor Lights" ===
Hugh Williams – Jimmy Kennedy. Original: possibly Harry Owens and His Royal Hawaiians.

Recorded: Possibly July 5, 1954 (session 1)

The 4-CD boxed set Today, Tomorrow and Forever contains an alternate version (take three).

=== "Blue Moon of Kentucky" ===
"Blue Moon of Kentucky" is a bluegrass song by Bill Monroe, originally recorded by "Bill Monroe and His Bluegrass Boys" (1947, Columbia).

Recorded: July 7, 1954 (session 1)

The 1992 album The King of Rock 'n' Roll: The Complete 50s Masters contains a fragment (1:03) of an alternate take in a slower, more country style. This take was originally released on bootleg in 1974, having been located at Sun Records many years after Presley left for RCA.

=== "Blue Moon" ===
R. Rodgers – L. Hart.
Original: Ted Fio Rito & His Orchestra (Brunswick LA231=C 11/19/1934)
Also: Connie Boswell (Brunswick 16642, 1/15/1935) (many other recordings of this standard also preceded Presley's)

Recorded: August 19, 1954 (session 2)

=== "Tomorrow Night" ===
Sam Coslow – Will Grosz. Original: Lonnie Johnson (1948, King)

Recorded: September 12–16, 1954 (session 3)

=== "I'll Never Let You Go (Little Darlin')" ===
Jimmy Wakely. Original: Jimmy Wakely (1943, Decca)

Recorded: September 12–16, 1954 (session 3)

=== "Satisfied" ===
Recorded: September 12–16, 1954 (session 3) (tape lost)

=== "I Don't Care If the Sun Don't Shine" ===
M. David. Original probably Patti Page (1950, Mercury)

Recorded: September 12–16, 1954 (session 3)

The Dean Martin version was probably Presley's inspiration.

=== "Just Because" ===
Sydney Robin – Bob Shelton – Joe Shelton. Original: The Shelton Brothers (1942, Decca) Recorded 1933

Also; Lonestar Cowboys, 1933 on RCA (Victor), Nelstone's Hawaiians: Victor V40273 (1929). The song was also recorded by Frank Yankovic and was responsible for his band being rated the #13 band "on the Nation's Juke Boxes" in 1948.

Recorded: September 12–16, 1954 (session 3)

=== "Good Rockin' Tonight" ===
Roy Brown. Original Roy Brown (1947, DeLuxe); also Wynonie "Mr. Blues" Harris (1948, King)

Recorded: September 12–16, 1954 (session 3)

=== "Milkcow Blues Boogie" ===
Kokomo Arnold. Original probably Kokomo Arnold (1935, Decca)

Other releases: Johnny Lee Wills (1941, Decca); Moon Mullican (1946, King); Bob Wills & His Texas Playboys as "Brain Cloudy Blues", (1946, Columbia)

Recorded: December 8, 1954 (session 4)

=== "You're a Heartbreaker" ===
Jack Sallee

Recorded: December 8, 1954 (session 4)

=== "Baby Let's Play House" ===
Arthur Gunter. Original: Arthur Gunter (1954, Excello)

Recorded: February 11, 1955 (session 5)

In 1951 Eddy Arnold recorded a song titled "I Want to Play House with You" by Cy Coben. This song has been misidentified as the same song. It is not.

=== "I Got a Woman" ===
Ray Charles

Recorded: February 5, 1955 (session 5) (tape lost)

=== "Tryin' to Get to You" ===
Rose Marie McCoy – Charles Singleton. Original: The Eagles (1954, Mercury)

Recorded: February 11, 1955 (session 5, not published) and July 11, 1955 (session 7, published)

In 2002, RCA included information in the liner notes of Sunrise as to Presley recording this song while simultaneously playing the piano, and not aided by his rhythm guitar, as previously believed. Because the piano was not directly miked, it can only be heard faintly in the background.

=== "I'm Left, You're Right, She's Gone" ===
Stan Kesler – William Taylor

Recorded: March 5, 1955 (session 6)

=== "I Forgot to Remember to Forget" ===
Stan Kesler – Charlie Feathers

Recorded: July 11, 1955 (session 7)

=== "Mystery Train" ===
Junior Parker – Sam Phillips. Original: Little Junior's Blue Flames (1953, Sun)

Recorded: July 11, 1955 (session 7)

=== "When It Rains, It Really Pours" ===
William R. Emerson. Original: Billy Emerson (1955, Sun)

Recorded: November 20, 1955 (session 8)

== Late, rumored and legendary recordings ==
=== The Million Dollar Quartet (session recordings) ===
On December 4, 1956, nearly a year after Presley had left Sun for RCA Victor, he visited the Sun Studio; An impromptu jam session was unofficially recorded with Carl Perkins (then already famous for his "Blue Suede Shoes"), Jerry Lee Lewis (relatively unknown at the time), and Johnny Cash (not heard on the tapes, although he does appear on the cover photo). Singing songs as they came to mind, around 40 titles were recorded, most of them incomplete. Presley is heard talking about a singer he saw in Las Vegas, doing his version of "Don't Be Cruel" and enjoying "Brown Eyed Handsome Man" from Chuck Berry.

Recorded: December 4, 1956.

=== Rumored ===
Over the decades, several additional recordings have been claimed as having been recorded by Presley at Sun Records. The reference work Elvis: The Illustrated Record by Roy Carr and Mick Farren lists the following songs that were, as of 1982, believed to have been recorded by Presley at Sun Records but as of 2009 remain unreleased and unaccounted for in the official record:

- "Tennessee Saturday Night" (2 takes recorded July 5–7, 1954). According to Carr and Farren, RCA planned to include this recording on the 1965 compilation album Elvis for Everyone!, but substituted the Sun side "Tomorrow Night" instead.
- "Uncle Penn" (1 take recorded September 9, 1954). Carr and Farren claim the existence of "Uncle Penn" is proven by it being listed on the session sheet for the recording session of December 8, 1954, that produced "Tomorrow Night" however this contradicts the authors' chart that gives the September 9 recording date.
- "Oakie Boogie" (1 take recorded December 8, 1954).

== Releases ==
Most of the tapes, including the private single, the Million Dollar Quartet and alternate takes have been released.

=== Sun Singles ===
Ten songs, making five singles, were originally released on the Sun label. These records (in both 45 RPM and 78 RPM formats) are among the most valuable of Presley's output, fetching four figures in excellent condition:

- Sun 209—July 19, 1954: "That's All Right" / "Blue Moon of Kentucky"
- Sun 210—September 25, 1954: "Good Rockin' Tonight" / "I Don't Care If the Sun Don't Shine"
- Sun 215—December 28, 1954: "Milkcow Blues Boogie" / "You're a Heartbreaker"
- Sun 217—April 10, 1955: "Baby Let's Play House" / "I'm Left, You're Right, She's Gone"
- Sun 223—August 6, 1955: "I Forgot to Remember to Forget" / "Mystery Train"

=== RCA Releases ===
After signing with RCA, the same songs, in the same b/w combination, were re-released by RCA (December 1955). The songs were available on 78 RPM and 45 RPM, which explains the two ordering-numbers 20/47, respectively:

- RCA 20/47-6357: Sun 223
- RCA 20/47-6380: Sun 209
- RCA 20/47-6381: Sun 210
- RCA 20/47-6382: Sun 215
- RCA 20/47-6383: Sun 217

The same pairings were later reissued as part of RCA's Gold Standard series in five different label formats: Black label with dog at top (September 1958), black label with dog on left side (September 1965), orange label (November 1968), red label (September 1970), and black label with dog in upper right hand corner (September 1976)

- 447-0600: Sun 223
- 447-0601: Sun 209
  - B-side of red label version misspells Presley as "PRESELY"
- 447-0602: Sun 210
  - The original "dog on top" copies of the above two were released with special picture sleeves
- 447-0603: Sun 215
- 447-0604: Sun 217

=== Elvis Presley (1956) ===
On January 27, 1956, the first RCA single, "Heartbreak Hotel" b/w "I Was the One" was released, giving Presley a nationwide breakthrough. His reputation as a performer on stage was already growing in the same dimensions.

On March 23, 1956, the first album, Elvis Presley, was released (RCA 1254). "Heartbreak Hotel" was at that moment climbing the lists, but as rock and roll was largely bought by teenagers at the time and teenagers usually bought singles, albums were seen as less important for the genre. So "Heartbreak Hotel" is not on this album. RCA, however, put five unreleased Sun recordings on this album:

- "I Love You Because"
- "Just Because"
- "Tryin' to Get to You"
- "I'll Never Let You Go (Little Darlin')"
- "Blue Moon"

=== For LP Fans Only (1958) and A Date with Elvis (1959) ===
These two albums were released during Presley's hitch in the Army, consisting of tracks previously released only as singles or on EPs, including all but one of the ten commercially released Sun tracks. Four were included on For LP Fans Only...

- "That's All Right"
- "Mystery Train"
- "I'm Left, You're Right, She's Gone"
- "You're a Heartbreaker"

...with five featured on A Date with Elvis:

- "Blue Moon of Kentucky"
- "Milkcow Blues Boogie"
- "Baby, Let's Play House"
- "Good Rockin' Tonight"
- "I Forgot to Remember to Forget"

The remaining commercial release, "I Don't Care If the Sun Don't Shine", would not appear on LP until the 1976 compilation "The Sun Sessions".

=== Elvis for Everyone! (1965) ===
- "Tomorrow Night" (Previously unreleased; original Sun master overdubbed with new instrumental and vocal backing by producer Chet Atkins for this release only)
- "When It Rains, It Really Pours" (1957 re-recording of an unreleased Sun track from 1955)

=== The Sun Sessions (1976) ===
On March 22, 1976, the album The Sun Sessions was released, with 16 out of the 24 known Sun titles:

- "That's All Right"
- "Blue Moon of Kentucky"
- "I Don't Care If the Sun Don't Shine"
- "Good Rockin' Tonight"
- "Milkcow Blues Boogie"
- "You're a Heartbreaker"
- "I'm Left, You're Right, She's Gone"
- "Baby Let's Play House"
- "Mystery Train"
- "I Forgot to Remember to Forget"
- "I'll Never Let You Go (Little Darlin')"
- "I Love You Because"
- "Tryin' to Get to You"
- "Blue Moon"
- "Just Because"
- "I Love You Because" (second version)

Missing:

- The private recordings
- "Harbor Lights"
- "Tomorrow Night"
- "When It Rains, It Really Pours"
- "Satisfied"
- "I Got a Woman"

=== The Complete Sun Sessions [33-track 2LP-set] / The Sun Sessions [28-track CD] (1987) ===
Although the title suggests more, only 18 out of the 24 known Sun songs are here. The album does contain several takes from "I Love You Because", and "I'm Left, You're Right, She's Gone".
Missing:

- The private recordings
- "Satisfied"
- "I Got a Woman"

=== The Million Dollar Quartet (1989) ===
The recordings have been released in 1989 as a CD, titled, Elvis Presley - The Million Dollar Quartet (RCA CD # 2023-2-R)

=== The King of Rock 'n' Roll: The Complete 50s Masters (1992) ===
Nearly every song Presley recorded at Sun is present here (although "That's When Your Heartaches Begin" is hidden on CD number 5; the rest is on CD 1).
Missing:

- "Satisfied" (apparently lost forever), all but one track from the Million Dollar Quartet session, as well as "It Wouldn't be the Same Without You" and "I'll Never Stand in Your Way". The latter two songs appear on yet another (and as complete as possible) Sun sessions CD titled Sunrise.

=== Sunrise (1999) ===
Another delving in the Sun Records vaults is the most complete collection of Presley's recordings from that time. All the masters, some demos and alternate recordings, and a few early live-recorded tracks. Missing:

- "Satisfied"
- "Woman (I Gotta)

=== Elvis at Sun (2004) ===
The current (as of mid-2006) version of the Sun recordings. Contains the five singles ("That's All Right" / "Blue Moon of Kentucky"; "Good Rockin' Tonight" / "I Don't Care If the Sun Don't Shine"; "Milkcow Blues Boogie" / "You're a Heartbreaker"; "Baby Let's Play House" / "I'm Left, You're Right, She's Gone"; "I Forgot to Remember to Forget" / "Mystery Train") plus "Harbor Lights", "I Love You Because" (alternate take 2), "Tomorrow Night", "I'll Never Let You Go (Little Darlin')", "Just Because", "I'm Left, You're Right, She's Gone" (slow version), "Tryin' to Get to You", and "When It Rains, It Really Pours".

Missing:

- Private recordings and demos:
  - "My Happiness",
  - "That's When Your Heartaches Begin"
  - "I'll Never Stand in Your Way"
  - "It Wouldn't Be the Same Without You"
- "I Love You Because" (first version) (available on Elvis Presley)
- The lost "Satisfied"
- "I Got a Woman" (Re-recording available on Elvis Presley)

=== A Boy from Tupelo: The Complete 1953–55 Recordings (2012) ===
A limited-edition 3-CD box set released in June 2012 by RCA/Sony collectors' label Follow That Dream (FTD) Records, as a companion piece to a book by Ernst Mikael Jørgensen, also entitled A Boy from Tupelo. The book chronicles Presley's day-to-day life from July 4, 1954 (the day when he first rehearsed with guitarist Scotty Moore) to December 31, 1955, including many previously unpublished testimonies, accounts and details on every single show performed by Presley during the period (the book is, indeed, mainly intended as a complete concertography and tourography of Elvis Presley's early career). The first two of the three discs released in conjunction with the book feature, as the title specifies, all the material recorded by Presley from 1953 to 1955, including all of the alternate takes and all of the recordings which were missing from previous releases, with the exception of "Satisfied" and "I Got a Woman"; the latter two recordings are stated by Jørgensen himself, in the book, to be actually lost. However, a live rendition from March 19, 1955, of "I Got a Woman" is featured on the third disc of the package, along with 31 more live recordings from the era, 27 of which are previously unreleased. The A Boy from Tupelo book + CDs package, which was printed as a strictly limited run of 3,000 copies (each including a gift pack consisting in five 45-RPM reproductions of Presley's original Sun singles) sold out in 2012. In 2017 the set finally received wide release and added one track to Disc 3 which was previously unavailable: "I Forgot To Remember To Forget - Recorded at the Louisiana Hayride, Shreveport, Louisiana, October 29, 1955".

== See also ==
- Million Dollar Quartet
