= A Date with Elvis =

Compilation album by Elvis Presley
- Released: July 24, 1959
- Recorded: July 1954 – April 1957
- Genres: Rock and roll; rockabilly; country
- Length: 22:58
- Label: RCA Victor
- Producers: Sam Phillips (Sun recordings); Steve Sholes (RCA recordings)

Elvis Presley chronology
For LP Fans Only (1959)	A Date with Elvis (1959)	Elvis' Gold Records, Volume 2 (1959)

Singles from A Date with Elvis
- 1. "Good Rockin' Tonight" Released: September 22, 1954; 2. "Milkcow Blues Boogie" Released: January 8, 1955; 3. "Baby Let's Play House" Released: April 25, 1956; 4. "Young and Beautiful" Released: February 21, 1959

Professional ratings
Review scores
Source	Rating
AllMusic	5/5 stars
MusicHound	4.5/5 stars
Rough Guides	3/5 stars

A Date with Elvis is a compilation album by American singer and musician Elvis Presley, issued on RCA Victor (LPM 2011) in July 1959. The album compiled a selection of previously released material from multiple sessions at Sun, an August 1956 recording session at 20th Century Fox Stage One and two from Radio Recorders in Hollywood. The album reached #32 on the Billboard Top Pop Albums chart.

== Content ==
After Presley's induction into the army on March 24, 1958, RCA Victor and his manager, Colonel Tom Parker, were faced with the prospect of keeping his name before the public for two years with no possibility of live performances, no movies, and with few unissued marketable recordings in the vault. A recording session was arranged for two days in June, which yielded enough items for five more single sides, singles being the commercial focus for rock and roll in the 1950s. Four of those tracks would be issued on 45s in 1958 and 1959 during his absence while doing military service.

Presley, however, also did well in the albums market, all but one of his previous seven LPs charting no lower than #3, and RCA Victor wished to continue issuing albums by Presley given his sales record. Much of Presley's material had not been released on LP, and for this album RCA Victor collected material previously unavailable on album. Like its predecessor For LP Fans Only, this album featured tracks that had been issued on Sun Records with limited release, and were almost impossible to locate beyond certain parts of the south. However all 5 Sun singles were reissued by RCA Victor in November 1955 and remained in print through the 1970s. The remaining five tracks derived from three different EPs issued in 1956 and 1957.

Even by the standards of the late 1950s and early 1960s, where long-playing albums often ran to only about 35 minutes, this was a very short album at twenty-three minutes, and as such became the lowest charting Presley LP of the decade. RCA Victor would squeeze one more album in 1959 out of previously issued material, the second hit singles collection, but it too would be a lower seller by previous standard. Presley would return from overseas in 1960 to commence proper recording again. This album also folds out to be a calendar for the year 1960.

A different version of the album, duplicating six tracks from the American release, but expanding the track list to a healthy fourteen, was issued in Australia on vinyl in September 1959.

== Reissues ==
RCA first reissued the original 10-track album on compact disc in 1989. The album is also available in the 2016 boxed set, Elvis Presley - The Complete RCA Album Collection.

== Collective personnel ==
- Elvis Presley – vocals, guitar
- Scotty Moore – guitar
- Dudley Brooks – piano
- Mike Stoller – piano, backing vocals
- Bill Black – bass
- D. J. Fontana – drums
- Johnny Bernero – drums
- The Jordanaires – backing vocals

== Track listing ==
=== Original release ===
Side one
No.	Title	Writer(s)	Recording date	Length
1.	"Blue Moon of Kentucky"	Bill Monroe	July 7, 1954	2:02
2.	"Young and Beautiful"	Aaron Schroeder, Abner Silver	April 30, 1957	2:02
3.	"(You're So Square) Baby I Don't Care"	Jerry Leiber and Mike Stoller	April 30, 1957	1:51
4.	"Milkcow Blues Boogie"	Kokomo Arnold	November 12, 1954	2:38
5.	"Baby Let's Play House"	Arthur Gunter	February 5, 1955	2:15

Side two
No.	Title	Writer(s)	Recording date	Length
1.	"Good Rockin' Tonight"	Roy Brown	September 10, 1954	2:12
2.	"Is It So Strange"	Faron Young	January 19, 1957	2:28
3.	"We're Gonna Move"	Vera Matson, Elvis Presley	August 24, 1956	2:30
4.	"I Want to Be Free"	Jerry Leiber and Mike Stoller	April 30, 1957	2:12
5.	"I Forgot to Remember to Forget"	Stan Kesler, Charlie Feathers	July 11, 1955	2:28

The Album Collection bonus tracks
No.	Title	Length
11.	"Don't Leave Me Now (movie version)"	2:05
12.	"Harbor Lights"	2:36

=== UK, Australian and German reissue ===
No.	Title	Writer(s)	Recording date	Length
1.	"Blue Moon of Kentucky"	Bill Monroe	July 7, 1954	2:02
2.	"Milkcow Blues Boogie"	Kokomo Arnold	November 12, 1954	2:38
3.	"Baby Let's Play House"	Arthur Gunter	February 5, 1955	2:15
4.	"I Don't Care if the Sun Don't Shine"	Mack David	September 11, 1954	2:27
5.	"Tutti Frutti"	Dorothy LaBostrie and Richard Penniman	January 31, 1956	1:58
6.	"I'm Gonna Sit Right Down and Cry (Over You)"	Howard Biggs and Joe Thomas	January 31, 1956	2:01
7.	"I Got a Woman"	Ray Charles and Renald Richard	January 10, 1956	2:23
8.	"Good Rockin' Tonight"	Roy Brown	September 11, 1954	2:12
9.	"Is It So Strange"	Faron Young	January 19, 1957	2:28
10.	"We're Gonna Move"	Vera Matson and Elvis Presley	August 24, 1956	2:30
11.	"Blue Moon"	Richard Rodgers and Lorenz Hart	August 19, 1954	2:31
12.	"Just Because"	Sydney Robin, Bob Shelton, Joe Shelton	September 11, 1954	2:32
13.	"One-sided Love Affair"	Bill Campbell	January 30, 1956	2:09
14.	"Let Me"	Vera Matson and Elvis Presley	September 4, 1956	2:08

== Chart performance ==
Chart (1959)	Peak position
US Billboard 200	32
