= For LP Fans Only =

Compilation album by Elvis Presley
- Released: February 6, 1959
- Recorded: July 1954 – October 1956
- Studios: Radio Recorders, Hollywood; RCA, Nashville; RCA Victor, New York City; Sun, Memphis
- Genres: Rockabilly, rock and roll
- Length: 23:28
- Label: RCA Victor
- Producers: Sam Phillips (Sun recordings); Steve Sholes (RCA recordings)

Elvis Presley chronology
King Creole (1958)	For LP Fans Only (1959)	A Date with Elvis (1959)

Singles from For LP Fans Only
- 1. "That's All Right" Released: July 19, 1954; 2. "Mystery Train" Released: August 1, 1955; 3. "Shake, Rattle and Roll" Released: August 31, 1956

Professional ratings
Review scores
Source	Rating
AllMusic	5/5 stars
MusicHound	4.5/5 stars
Rough Guides	3/5 stars

For LP Fans Only is a compilation album by American singer and musician Elvis Presley, released on February 6, 1959, by RCA Victor. It compiled previously released material from an August 1956 recording session at 20th Century Fox Stage One, a September 1956 session at Radio Recorders in Hollywood, sessions on January 10 and 11 at the RCA Victor Studios in Nashville, two more at the RCA Victor Studios in New York, and multiple sessions at Sun Studio. The album reached number 19 on the Billboard Top Pop Albums chart.

== Content ==
After Presley's induction into the United States Army on March 24, 1958, RCA Victor and Presley's manager, Colonel Tom Parker, were faced with the prospect of keeping his name before the public for two years with no possibility of live performances or movies, and few unissued marketable recordings in the vault. A recording session was arranged for two days in June, which yielded enough items for five more single sides, singles being the commercial focus for rock and roll in the 1950s. Four of those tracks would be issued on 45s in 1958 and 1959 during his absence while doing military service.

Presley, however, also did well in the albums market. Each of his previous six LPs charted no lower than number three, and RCA wished to continue to release albums by their hot commodity given his sales record. Much of Presley's material had been issued on single records, not on LP. For this album, RCA Victor collected nine tracks previously available in single form only, as well as "Poor Boy" from the Love Me Tender EP. Four of the tracks had been issued on Sun Records with limited release, and were very difficult to come by outside of the south. However all 5 Sun singles were reissued by RCA Victor in November 1955 and remained in print through the 1970s.

"That's All Right (Mama)" was never issued as a single in the UK during Presley's lifetime.

== Reissues ==
RCA first reissued the original 10 track album For LP Fans Only on compact disc in 1989. The album is included in a 25 disc package, "The Perfect Blues Collection", released by Sony in 2011. The album is also available in the 2016 60 CD boxed set Elvis Presley – The Complete RCA Album Collection.

== Collective personnel ==
- Elvis Presley – vocals, rhythm guitar
- Scotty Moore – lead guitar
- Chet Atkins – rhythm guitar
- Floyd Cramer – piano
- Shorty Long – piano on "My Baby Left Me"
- Gordon Stoker – piano, backing vocals
- Bill Black – bass
- D.J. Fontana – drums
- Jimmie Lott – drums
- Johnny Bernero – drums
- The Jordanaires – backing vocals
- Ben Speer – backing vocals
- Brock Speer – backing vocals

== Track listing ==
Side one
No.	Title	Writer(s)	Recording date	Length
1.	"That's All Right"	Arthur Crudup	July 5, 1954	1:55
2.	"Lawdy, Miss Clawdy"	Lloyd Price	February 3, 1956	2:08
3.	"Mystery Train"	Herman Parker Jr.; Sam Phillips	July 11, 1955	2:24
4.	"Playing for Keeps"	Stan Kesler	September 1, 1956	2:50
5.	"Poor Boy"	Vera Matson; Elvis Presley	August 24, 1956	2:13

Side two
No.	Title	Writer(s)	Recording date	Length
1.	"My Baby Left Me"	Arthur Crudup	January 30, 1956	2:12
2.	"I Was the One"	Aaron Schroeder; Claude Demetrius; Hal Blair; Bill Peppers	January 11, 1956	2:34
3.	"Shake, Rattle And Roll"	Charles Calhoun	February 3, 1956	2:37
4.	"I'm Left, You're Right, She's Gone"	Stan Kesler; William Taylor	March 5, 1955	2:36
5.	"You're a Heartbreaker"	Jack Sallee	November 12, 1954	2:12

German reissue edition
No.	Title	Writer(s)	Recording date	Length
1.	"That's All Right"	Crudup	July 5, 1954	1:55
2.	"Lawdy, Miss Clawdy"	Price	February 3, 1956	2:08
3.	"Mystery Train"	Parker Jr.; Phillips	July 11, 1955	2:24
4.	"Playing for Keeps"	Kesler	September 1, 1956	2:50
5.	"Poor Boy"	Matson; Presley	August 24, 1956	2:13
6.	"Money Honey"	Jesse Stone	January 10, 1956	2:36
7.	"I'm Counting on You"	Don Robertson	January 11, 1956	2:24
8.	"My Baby Left Me"	Crudup	January 30, 1956	2:12
9.	"I Was the One"	Schroeder; DeMetrius; Blair; Peppers	January 11, 1956	2:34
10.	"Shake, Rattle and Roll"	Calhoun	February 3, 1956	2:37
11.	"I'm Left, You're Right, She's Gone"	Kesler; Taylor	March 5, 1955	2:36
12.	"You're a Heartbreaker"	Sallee	November 12, 1954	2:12
13.	"Trying to Get to You"	Rose Marie McCoy; Margie Singleton	July 11, 1955	2:33
14.	"Blue Suede Shoes"	Carl Perkins	January 30, 1956	1:58

== Chart performance ==
Chart (1959)	Peak position
US Billboard 200	19
