= If You're Ever Down in Texas, Look Me Up =

Song

If You're Ever Down In Texas, Look Me Up is an American folk song written by Terry Shand and "By" Dunham, and first released in the 1940s.

The lyrics of the song tell of a traveler from Texas singing about the vast wealth and natural beauty of his home, inviting the audience to "look me up" during their next visit to Texas.

== In other media ==
In 1950, Ken Darby recorded this song for the Tom and Jerry short Texas Tom, in which Tom lip-synchs the song to a female cat, only to be exposed when Jerry alters the speeds on the hidden record player.
