= Poor Boy (Elvis Presley song) =

Song by Elvis Presley

from the album Love Me Tender
- Released: 1956
- Recorded: 1956
- Studio: Hollywood
- Genre: Country; pop
- Length: 2:18
- Label: RCA Victor
- Songwriters: Ken Darby (principal songwriter); Elvis Presley (credited); Vera Matson (credited)
- Producer: Lionel Newman

"Poor Boy" is a song by Elvis Presley. The song is credited to Elvis Presley and Vera Matson, the wife of Ken Darby, the principal writer, published by Elvis Presley Music. The song was featured in the 20th Century Fox movie Love Me Tender and was released as an RCA Victor EP in 1956.

== Background ==
"Poor Boy" was recorded on August 24, 1956.

"Poor Boy" appeared in the 1956 movie Love Me Tender released by 20th Century Fox. The song was released on an RCA Victor EP from the movie, Love Me Tender, EPA-4006, which also included the title track, "We're Gonna Move", and "Let Me".

== Soundtrack ==
"Poor Boy" reached No. 35 on the U.S. Billboard pop singles chart in December 1956, in an 11-week chart run.

Instead of a full long-playing album soundtrack, for Love Me Tender the four songs appearing in the film were released as an extended-play, seven-inch 45 RPM record on RCA Records, Love Me Tender, catalog EPA 4006, during November 1956. The EP was certified Platinum by the RIAA. The EP reached No. 10 on the Billboard EP chart, and No. 22 on the Billboard 200 album chart.

The four EP soundtrack songs were recorded at 20th Century Fox's Stage One in Hollywood, at three sessions on August 24, September 4, and October 1, 1956.

== Personnel ==
- Elvis Presley – vocals
- Vito Mumolo – lead acoustic guitar
- Luther Rountree – rhythm acoustic guitar
- Dom Frontieri – accordion
- Mike "Myer" Rubin – double bass
- Richard Cornell – drums
- Rad Robinson – backing vocals
- Jon Dodson – backing vocals
- Charles Prescott -backing vocals

== Other versions ==
Hillary Hawkins released the song as a 45 single on Wide World Records. Col Joye and The Joy Boys released a version in 1964. Paul Ansell recorded the song in 1999. Carlos and The Bandidos recorded the song in 2003. Wim Vandevelde recorded the song in Belgium.

Paul McCartney recorded the song in 1987 for the Choba B CCCP, or Back in the USSR, album which remains unreleased.

== Sources ==
- Guralnick, Peter. Last Train to Memphis: The Rise of Elvis Presley. Little, Brown; 1994. ISBN 0-316-33225-9.
- Guralnick, Peter. Careless Love: The Unmaking of Elvis Presley. Back Bay Books; 1999. ISBN 0-316-33297-6.
- Guralnick, Peter; Jorgensen, Ernst. Elvis Day by Day: The Definitive Record of His Life and Music. Ballantine; 1999. ISBN 0-345-42089-6.
- Hopkins, Jerry. Elvis—The Biography. Plexus; 2007. ISBN 0-85965-391-9.
- Jorgensen, Ernst. Elvis Presley—A Life in Music: The Complete Recording Sessions. St Martin's Press; 1998. ISBN 0-312-18572-3.
