= Let Me (Elvis Presley song) =

Song by Elvis Presley

from the EP Love Me Tender
- Language: English
- Released: 1956
- Recorded: 1956
- Studio: 20th Century Fox, Hollywood
- Length: 2:11
- Label: RCA Victor
- Songwriter(s): Ken Darby (principal songwriter); Elvis Presley (credited); Vera Matson (credited)
- Producer(s): Lionel Newman

"Let Me" is a 1956 song by Elvis Presley. The song is credited to Elvis Presley and Vera Matson, the wife of Ken Darby, the principal writer, published by Elvis Presley Music. The song was featured in the 20th Century Fox movie Love Me Tender and was released as an RCA Victor EP in 1956.

== Background ==
"Let Me" was recorded on September 4, 1956, in Hollywood, California, at the 20th Century Fox studio..

"Let Me" appeared in the 1956 movie Love Me Tender. The song was released on an RCA Victor EP from the movie, Love Me Tender, EPA-4006, which also included the title track, "Poor Boy", and "We're Gonna Move".

== Soundtrack ==
Instead of a full long-playing album soundtrack, for Love Me Tender the four songs appearing in the film were released as an extended-play, seven-inch 45 RPM record on RCA Records, Love Me Tender, catalog EPA 4006, during November 1956. The EP was certified Platinum by the RIAA. The EP reached No. 10 on the Billboard EP chart, and No. 22 on the Billboard 200 album chart. It peaked at No. 9 on the Top Pop Albums chart with sales of over 600,000, as well as making it to No. 35 on the singles chart.

The four EP soundtrack songs were recorded at 20th Century Fox's Stage One in Hollywood, at three sessions on August 24, September 4, and October 1, 1956.

== Personnel ==
- Elvis Presley – vocals
- Vito Mumolo – lead acoustic guitar
- Luther Rountree – rhythm acoustic guitar
- Carl Fortina – accordion
- Mike "Myer" Rubin – double bass
- Richard Cornell – drums
- Rad Robinson – backing vocals
- Jon Dodson – backing vocals
- Charles Prescott -backing vocals

== Sources ==
- Guralnick, Peter. Last Train to Memphis: The Rise of Elvis Presley. Little, Brown; 1994. ISBN 0-316-33225-9.
- Guralnick, Peter. Careless Love: The Unmaking of Elvis Presley. Back Bay Books; 1999. ISBN 0-316-33297-6.
- Guralnick, Peter; Jorgensen, Ernst. Elvis Day by Day: The Definitive Record of His Life and Music. Ballantine; 1999. ISBN 0-345-42089-6.
- Hopkins, Jerry. Elvis—The Biography. Plexus; 2007. ISBN 0-85965-391-9.
- Jorgensen, Ernst. Elvis Presley—A Life in Music: The Complete Recording Sessions. St Martin's Press; 1998. ISBN 0-312-18572-3.
