= Nelstone's Hawaiians =

Nelstone's Hawaiians was an American folk duo from southern Alabama consisting of steel guitarist Hubert Nelson and guitarist James D. Touchstone, who were also the vocalists. Nelstone's arose from the combination of the surnames of both members.

They recorded for the Victor record company towards the end of the 1920s on 10-inch or 78 RPM records. Their sound corresponded to the Hawaiian style of steel-guitar, very popular at the time, after Hawaii was annexed by the United States in the late 19th century.

They are best known for songs including "Fatal Flower Garden" (which was included on Harry Everett Smith's Anthology of American Folk Music), "Just Because", and "You'll Never Find a Daddy Like Me".

In 1948, the duo sued Leeds Music and Columbia Records for unauthorized use of their song Just Because.

== Discography ==
Recorded between 1928 and 1929

- Just Lonesome (Unissued)
- Adam and Eve
- North-Bound Train (includes verses from the song "Going For a Pardon")
- You'll Never Find a Daddy Like Me
- Mobile County Blues
- Just Because
- Village School
- Fatal Flower Garden
