= Love Me Tender (EP) =

EP (soundtrack) by Elvis Presley
- Released: November 1, 1956
- Recorded: August–September 1956
- Studio: Fox (Hollywood)
- Genre: Country
- Length: 9:31
- Label: RCA Victor
- Producer: Lionel Newman

Elvis Presley chronology
Elvis (1956)	Love Me Tender (1956)	Peace in the Valley (1957)

Singles from Love Me Tender
- 1. "Love Me Tender" Released: September 14, 1956

Love Me Tender is an EP by Elvis Presley, containing the four songs from the motion picture of the same name. It was released by RCA Victor in November 1956. The EP peaked at No. 9 on Top Pop Albums chart with sales of over 600,000, as well as making it to No. 35 on the singles chart. It was simultaneously certified Gold and Platinum by the Recording Industry Association of America on March 27, 1992.

== Background ==
The film was originally intended to be a straight acting role for Presley, but due to the popularity of the single "Love Me Tender" and Colonel Tom Parker's desire to promote Presley's films with a soundtrack and vice versa, four songs were added to the film. Parker would very seldom deviate from this formula for the remainder of Presley's film career.

Instead of a full long-playing album soundtrack, for Love Me Tender the four songs appearing in the film were released as an extended-play or E.P. seven-inch 45 RPM record on RCA Victor, Love Me Tender, catalog EPA 4006, during November 1956.

== Content ==
The four EP soundtrack songs were recorded at Fox's Stage One in Hollywood, at three sessions on August 24, September 4, and October 1, 1956. The title song was released as a single on September 14, 1956, and went to No. 1 on the singles chart.

The music was based on the Civil War ballad "Aura Lee", with new lyrics by Ken Darby. Darby, in fact, wrote all of the soundtrack songs, but credited them to his wife, Vera Matson, while Parker cut his publishing company, Hill and Range, in on the royalties by further crediting the writing to Presley as well. A reprise of "Love Me Tender" was recorded on October 1 and is heard at the end of the film; this short track was not released until after Presley's death. The sessions for these songs were the only time in the decade that Presley recorded with musicians outside his regular coterie.

== Track listing ==
All tracks are written by Ken Darby but credited to Elvis Presley and Vera Matson.

Side one
No.	Title	Recording date	Length
1.	"Love Me Tender"	August 24, 1956	2:41
2.	"Let Me"	September 4, 1956	2:08

Side two
No.	Title	Recording date	Length
1.	"Poor Boy"	August 24, 1956	2:13
2.	"We're Gonna Move"	August 24, 1956	2:30

=== 1997 Compact disc reissue with bonus tracks, including the songs from the Jailhouse Rock soundtrack ===
No.	Title	Writer(s)	Recording date	Length
1.	"Jailhouse Rock"	Jerry Leiber and Mike Stoller	April 30, 1957	2:35
2.	"Treat Me Nice"	Jerry Leiber and Mike Stoller	September 5, 1957	2:10
3.	"I Want to Be Free"	Jerry Leiber and Mike Stoller	May 3, 1957	2:12
4.	"Don't Leave Me Now"	Aaron Schroeder and Ben Weisman	May 9, 1957	2:05
5.	"Young and Beautiful"	Aaron Schroeder and Abner Silver	April 30, 1957	2:02
6.	"(You're So Square) Baby I Don't Care"	Jerry Leiber and Mike Stoller	May 3, 1957	1:51
7.	"Jailhouse Rock" (film version)	Jerry Leiber and Mike Stoller	April 30, 1957	2:32
8.	"Treat Me Nice" (film version)	Jerry Leiber and Mike Stoller	May 3, 1957	1:59
9.	"I Want to Be Free" (film version)	Jerry Leiber and Mike Stoller	May 3, 1957	2:06
10.	"Young and Beautiful" (film version)	Aaron Schroeder and Abner Silver	April 30, 1957	1:09
11.	"Don't Leave Me Now" (previously unreleased alternate take)	Aaron Schroeder and Ben Weisman	May 3, 1957	1:45
12.	"Love Me Tender"	Vera Matson and Elvis Presley	August 24, 1956	2:41
13.	"Poor Boy"	Vera Matson and Elvis Presley	August 24, 1956	2:13
14.	"Let Me"	Vera Matson and Elvis Presley	September 4, 1956	2:09
15.	"We're Gonna Move"	Vera Matson and Elvis Presley	August 24, 1956	2:30
16.	"Love Me Tender" (end title version)	Vera Matson and Elvis Presley	October 1, 1956	1:08
17.	"Let Me" (previously unreleased alternate take)	Vera Matson and Elvis Presley	September 4, 1956	2:04
18.	"We're Gonna Move" (previously unreleased alternate take)	Vera Matson and Elvis Presley	August 24, 1956	2:39
19.	"Poor Boy" (previously unreleased stereo version)	Vera Matson and Elvis Presley	August 24, 1956	2:42
20.	"Love Me Tender" (previously unreleased stereo version)	Vera Matson and Elvis Presley	August 24, 1956	2:42

== Personnel ==
- Elvis Presley – vocals
- Vito Mumolo – acoustic lead guitar
- Luther Rountree – acoustic rhythm guitar
- Mike "Myer" Rubin – double bass
- Richard Cornell – drums
- Dom Frontieri – accordion except "Let Me"
- Carl Fortina – accordion on "Let Me"
- Rad Robinson – backing vocals
- Jon Dodson – backing vocals
- Charles Prescott – backing vocals

== Charts ==
Chart (1957)	Peak position
U.S. Billboard 200	22
