= Dudley Brooks =

- Dudley Brooks and Elvis Presley at Radio Recorders studio

Background information
- Born: December 22, 1913; Los Angeles, California
- Died: July 17, 1989 (aged 75) Los Angeles
- Genres: Jazz, rock and roll
- Occupations: Pianist and songwriter
- Instrument: Piano
- Label: Multiple
- Formerly of: Elvis Presley, Kay Starr

Dudley Brooks (December 22, 1913 – July 17, 1989) was an American jazz pianist, arranger, and composer.

== Biography ==
Brooks was born on December 22, 1913, in Los Angeles, California. While under contract to Paramount Studios, Brooks spent considerable time working as a session piano player at the Radio Recorders studio in Los Angeles. For many years, Radio Recorders was one of the best known recording studios in the country and hosted performers such as Charlie Parker, Louis Armstrong, and Elvis Presley. Presley was also under contract to Paramount Studios where he was filming movies to include Girls! Girls! Girls! and Blue Hawaii. Paramount, to ensure Presley's recordings and movies stayed on schedule, regularly provided studio musicians to Radio Recorders. As a result, Brooks developed a professional relationship with Presley that spanned decades. Together, they collaborated on many albums and movies to include:

- Peace in the Valley (1957)
- Loving You
- Jailhouse Rock
- Elvis' Christmas Album
- A Date with Elvis (1959)
- G.I. Blues (1960)
- Flaming Star (movie soundtrack)
- Wild in the Country (1961, movie soundtrack)
- Blue Hawaii
- Kid Galahad (1962, movie soundtrack)
- Girls! Girls! Girls!
- It Happened at the World's Fair (1963)
- Fun in Acapulco
- Viva Las Vegas (1964, movie soundtrack)
- Elvis for Everyone (1965)
- Elvis' Gold Records Volume 4 (1968)
- Let's Be Friends (1970)
  Dudley Brooks working in a Los Angeles piano bar circa 1985

Brooks, one of several African Americans who worked with Presley, contradicted allegations that Presley was a racist.

During his career, Brooks also composed a number of songs often in collaboration with other songwriters. Among his works is the well-known Christmas song "(Everybody's Waitin' For) The Man with the Bag". Made popular by Kay Starr in 1950, the song has been covered by many artists to include the Brian Setzer Orchestra and Vonda Shepard.

Brooks' first cousin was singer Kitty White, who was the sole female voice on Elvis Presley's "Crawfish" from the King Creole film soundtrack.

Brooks died in his hometown of Los Angeles in 1989.

== See also ==
- List of jazz arrangers
