= The Shelton Brothers =

American country music trio

The Shelton Brothers, Bob, Joe and Merle, were pioneer country musicians and renowned recording artists based out of Texas from 1933 through the 1960s. They created and popularized the songs Johnson's Old Gray Mule, Deep Elm Blues, These Shoes Are Killing Me, Oh Monah, Match Box Blues and My Heart Oozes Blood For You, "What's The Matter With Deep Elm", "I'm A Handy Man To Have Around" and "Henpecked Husband Blues". The Shelton Brothers (Joe and Bob) also wrote (their names appear as co-writers, but the writer was actually, individually, Sydney Robin) and were the second to record "Just Because" (Decca 46008), a song that has since been recorded numerous times by various artists including Elvis Presley who included it on his very first album titled "Elvis Presley". The original recording was by Nelstone's Hawaiians, comprising Hubert Nelson and James D. Touchstone. The song's opening line reads: Just because you think you're so pretty, just because you think you're so hot..... "Just Because" was the Shelton's first release on Decca but, due to their popularity, they went on to cut over 150 sides for the label. They also recorded sides for Victor Records and King Records. The Shelton Brothers would become one of the most successful country acts of the era.

The Shelton Brothers was also one of the earliest acts to appear on the famous Big D Jamboree which originated from the Dallas Sportatorium in Dallas, Texas. They later became an integral part of The Saturday Night Shindig which also originated from Dallas.

== Discography ==
Record number	Titles	Record label
46008	Just Because / Deep Elm Blues	Decca Records
46009	Ida Red / South	Decca Records
5079	Beautiful Louisiana / Neath The Maple In The Lane	Decca Records
5099	Deep Elem Blues / Hang Out The Front door Key	Decca Records
5100	Just Because / Who Wouldn't Be Lonely	Decca Records
5135	Message From Home Sweet Home / Will There Be Cowboys Up In Heaven	Decca Records
5161	Johnson's Old Gray Mule / Nothin'	Decca Records
5170	Answer To Just Because / That's A Habit I've Never Had	Decca Records
5173	New John Henry Blues / Ridin' On A Humpback Mule!	Decca Records
5180	Eleven Miles From Leavenworth / Budded Roses	Decca Records
5190	I'm Sittin' On Top Of The World / Four Or Five Times	Decca Records
5198	Deep Elem Blues #2 / Daddy Don't Let No Low Down Hangin' Round	Decca Records
5219	When It's Night Time In Nevada / The Black Sheep	Decca Records
5261	Lover's Farewell / Sweet Evalina	Decca Records
5339	New Trouble In Mind / Dollar Down Dollar a Week	Decca Records
5353	Alone With My Sorrows / Story Of Seven Roses	Decca Records
5367	Just Because #3 / Giving everything Away	Decca Records
5381	She Was Happy Til She Met You / A Prisoner's Dream	Decca Records
5397	Goodness Gracious Gracie / Nobody But My Baby	Decca Records
5409	Cinda Lou / I'm Here To Get My Baby Out Of Jail	Decca Records
5422	Deep Elm Blues #3 / Go Long Mule	Decca Records
5440	Answer To Blue Eyes / Someone To Love When You're Gone	Decca Records
5456	Uncle Eph's Got The Coon / New Cindy Lou	Decca Records
5468	That Golden Love / Answer To Prisoner's Dream	Decca Records
5471	I'm Gonna Fix Your Wagon / Way Down In Georgia	Decca Records
5475	Blue Kimono Blues / My Gal Is Mean	Decca Records
5484	I Told Them All About You / Seven Years With The Wrong Woman	Decca Records
5496	By The Stump Of The Old Pine Tree / Eight More Years To Go	Decca Records
5508	When You Think A Lot About Somebody / Jealous	Decca Records

== See also ==
- Elvis Presley Sun recordings
- Big D Jamboree Performers
- Louisiana Hayride Performers
- 1935 Top Country Music Hits
