= Peace in the Valley (EP) =

EP by Elvis Presley
- Released: April 11, 1957
- Recorded: January 12, 13 & 19, 1957
- Studio: Radio Recorders (Los Angeles)
- Genre: Gospel
- Length: 12:36
- Label: RCA Victor
- Producer: Steve Sholes

Elvis Presley chronology
Love Me Tender (1956)	Peace in the Valley (1957)	Loving You (1957)

Peace in the Valley is an EP by American singer and musician Elvis Presley, released in April 1957 on RCA Victor Records in mono with catalogue number EPA 4054. It reached number three on the short-lived Billboard EP chart, number three on the album chart and number 39 on the singles chart.

== Background ==
By the 1950s, Presley's hometown of Memphis, Tennessee had become a center for gospel music in the United States. Presley grew up listening to this music, and maintained an abiding love for gospel singing his entire life. This EP initiated Presley's commercial presentation of this interest. Presley would go on to make many more recordings of spiritual music, including the issue of the gospel albums His Hand In Mine, How Great Thou Art, and He Touched Me, the latter two earning him Grammy Awards. A live recording of "How Great Thou Art" from the 1974 live album Elvis Recorded Live on Stage in Memphis would win Elvis a third Grammy.

== Content ==
The recordings included on the EP were taken from sessions on January 12, 13, and 19 at Radio Recorders in Hollywood, California. All four selections are gospel classics, including two by Thomas A. Dorsey "the Father of Black Gospel". The four songs are all reverential in spirit, rather than celebratory, uptempo gospel songs. Six months later, they were included in Presley's third studio album, Elvis' Christmas Album.

== Track listing ==
Side one
No.	Title	Writer(s)	Recording date	Length
1.	"(There'll Be) Peace in the Valley (For Me)"	Thomas A. Dorsey	January 13, 1957	3:22
2.	"It Is No Secret (What God Can Do)"	Stuart Hamblen	January 19, 1957	3:53

Side two
No.	Title	Writer(s)	Recording date	Length
1.	"I Believe"	Ervin Drake; Irvin Graham; Jimmy Shirl; Al Stillman	January 12, 1957	2:05
2.	"Take My Hand, Precious Lord"	Dorsey	January 13, 1957	3:16

== Personnel ==
Credits from Ernst Jørgensen and Keith Flynn's analysis of session tapes and RCA and AFM/union paperwork.

The Blue Moon Boys

- Elvis Presley – lead vocals, acoustic rhythm guitar
- Scotty Moore – electric lead guitar
- Bill Black – double bass
- D. J. Fontana – drums

The Jordanaires

- Gordon Stoker – backing vocals; piano on "Peace in the Valley", "I Believe", and "Take My Hand, Precious Lord"
- Hoyt Hawkins – backing vocals; organ on "It Is No Secret"
- Neal Matthews – backing vocals
- Hugh Jarrett – backing vocals

Additional personnel and production staff

- Dudley Brooks – piano on "It Is No Secret"
- Steve Sholes – producer
- Thorne Nogar – engineer
