= I'm Left, You're Right, She's Gone =

Song by Elvis Presley

Single by Elvis Presley

from the album Elvis Presley (UK edition)
- B-side: "Baby Let's Play House"
- Released: April 10, 1955
- Recorded: February–March 1955
- Studio: Sun Records' Studio, Memphis

"I'm Left, You're Right, She's Gone" (sometimes called "You're Right, I'm Left, She's Gone") is a song written by Bill Taylor and Stan Kesler, and originally recorded by Elvis Presley for Sun Records.

Released as a single in April 1955 (with "Baby Let's Play House" on the opposite side), the song made it into the top 10 of US Billboard's C&W Best Sellers in Stores chart.

== Composition ==
The song was written by Bill Taylor and Stan Kesler, members of a Sun Records band called Snearly Ranch Boys.

== Recording ==
The commercial (released) version was recorded by Elvis in February–March 1955 at Sun Records' Studio in Memphis. The recording features Elvis on acoustic guitar and his regular sidemen Scotty Moore on electric guitar and Bill Black on bass. Both are credited on the record's label (as Scotty & Bill). Session drummer Jimmie Lott was "brought in" for this recording by Sam Phillips.

== Description and critical analysis ==
The song's lyrics deal with a heartbreak, but in a humorous way. The singer says to his friend that the friend was right in warning him that the girl would break his heart. But the singer still had to find out for himself if she was "the one" for him.

According to Susan M. Doll in her book Understanding Elvis, the song "features a common characteristic of country music — the passive acceptance of the singer's fate and the subsequent melancholy it brings", as the person who sings the song "passively resigns himself to the fact" that his girl is gone.

Musically, it is a rockabilly ballad. Originally Elvis Presley recorded it in a blues arrangement, but the version that was released was "something of a novelty", which "was more in line with the commercial considerations of the day".

Mike Eder in his Elvis Music FAQ finds the recording too polished and too similar to other Elvis' songs of that time:

In the case of "I'm Left, You're Right, She's Gone," the rough edges should perhaps have been left on. It's unwise to place the blame for this totally on Sam [Phillips], since Elvis did after all willingly work on the completed master. Yet it's almost uncanny how close this flip side sounded, mood-wise, to "You're a Heartbreaker" before it and "I Forgot to Remember to Forget" after. That "I'm Left, You're Right, She's Gone" has more of a sparkle to it than the other two titles shouldn't be overlooked, but upon hearing the outtake, one can't help but feel that some of the life was ultimately polished out of it.

At about the one-minute mark, the song features Elvis' "trademark hiccup vocal break".

== Track listing ==
7" single (Sun 217, 1955)
No.	Title	Writer(s)	Length
1.	"I'm Left, You're Right, She's Gone"	Bill Taylor, Stan Kesler
2.	"Baby Let's Play House"	Arthur Gunter

== Charts ==
Chart (1958)	Peak position
UK Singles (Official Charts)	21
