= Just Because (Nelstone's Hawaiians song) =

Song performed by Jerry Lee Lewis

"Just Because" is a song written by Joe Shelton, Sydney Robin, and Bob Shelton and originally recorded by Nelstone's Hawaiians (Hubert Nelson and James D. Touchstone) in 1929 and later recorded by the Shelton Brothers in 1933. Some sources say that Sydney Robin wrote the song alone and the Sheltons added their name when they recorded it.

== Covers and other recordings ==
=== Elvis Presley version ===
"Just Because"

Single by Elvis Presley

from the album Elvis Presley
- B-side: "Blue Moon"
- Released: August 31, 1956
- Recorded: September 10, 1954
- Studio: Sun Studio, Memphis
- Genre: Rockabilly, rock and roll
- Length: 2:31
- Label: RCA Victor
- Songwriters: Bob Shelton, Joe Shelton, Sydney Robin

Elvis Presley singles chronology
"Tryin' to Get to You" (1956)	"Just Because" (1956)	"Money Honey" (1956)

Elvis Presley recorded the song on September 10, 1954, at Sun Studios; while it was never released on Sun, it was included on Elvis's self-titled first album, Elvis Presley in 1956, shortly after he signed to RCA Records.

=== Other covers ===
- In 1933, RCA Victor released a version of the song done by the Lonestar Cowboys. Nelstone's Hawaiians Victor V40273 (1929)
- The song was also recorded by Frankie Yankovic. Columbia agreed to release Yankovic's version of "Just Because" in 1948. This recording was inducted into the Grammy Hall of Fame in 1999.
- Paul McCartney later recorded the song in a style that was similar to that of Presley's version on his CHOBA B CCCP album.
- Duane Eddy included it on his 1959 album, Especially for You.
- Al Hirt released a version on his 1964 album, Beauty and the Beard.
- "Just Because" is the theme song of the Peninsula Banjo Band of San Jose, California. They have opened with the song at every performance since roughly 1966.
- Jorma Kaukonen included a version on his 2002 album release Blue Country Heart.
- The song is also included on Brian Setzer's 2005-release Rockabilly Riot Vol. 1: A Tribute to Sun Records.
- Recorded by the Poplin Family, included on their Folkways Records album The Poplin Family of Sumter, South Carolina,1963.
