= Love Me Tender (1956 film) =

1956 film directed by Robert D. Webb

- Theatrical release poster by Tom Chantrell
- Directed by: Robert D. Webb
- Screenplay by: Robert Buckner
- Story by: Maurice Geraghty
- Produced by: David Weisbart
- Starring: Richard Egan; Debra Paget; Elvis Presley; Robert Middleton; William Campbell; Neville Brand
- Cinematography: Leo Tover
- Edited by: Hugh S. Fowler
- Music by: Lionel Newman
- Distributed by: 20th Century Fox
- Release date: November 15, 1956
- Running time: 89 minutes
- Country: United States
- Language: English
- Budget: $1.292 million
- Box office: $4.5 million (US rentals)

Love Me Tender is a 1956 American musical Western film directed by Robert D. Webb, and released by 20th Century Fox on November 15, 1956. The film, named after the song, stars Richard Egan, Debra Paget, and Elvis Presley in his acting debut. It was the only time in his acting career that Elvis did not receive top billing.

Love Me Tender was originally to be titled The Reno Brothers, but when advanced sales of Presley's "Love Me Tender" single passed one million—a first for a single—the film's title was changed to match. Love Me Tender was the first of three films in which he played a historical figure. The others were Frankie & Johnny (which takes place in the 1890s) and The Trouble With Girls (which takes place in 1927).

== Plot ==
Presley plays Clint Reno, the youngest of the four Reno brothers, who stays home to take care of his mother and the family farm as older brothers Vance, Brett and Ray fight in the American Civil War for the Confederate Army. The family is mistakenly informed that eldest brother Vance has been killed on the battlefield. After four years of war, the brothers return home and find that Vance's former girlfriend Cathy has married Clint. Although Vance accepts this wholeheartedly, the family has to struggle to reach stability with this issue. It is clear from the outset upon the Reno brothers' return home that Cathy still loves Vance, although she is true to the younger Clint. Honor prevails for Vance, but jealousy leads Clint into irrational rivalry for Cathy's love.

In the film's opening scenes, the three Reno brothers, serving as Confederate cavalrymen, attack a Union train carrying a federal payroll of $12,000, not knowing that the war had ended only a day before at Appomattox Court House. The Confederates come to a decision to keep the money as spoils of war. A conflict of interest ensues when Vance tries to return the money against the wishes of some of his fellow Confederates, all of whom are being sought by the U.S. Government for robbery. The film reaches its tragic climax with Clint's death during a final shootout. In the end, the money is returned, the Reno brothers are released, the other three ex-Confederates are arrested, and Clint is laid to rest at the family farm with the grave saying “Here lies Clint Reno, a good family man, known under God”

== Cast ==
- Richard Egan as Vance Reno, oldest of the four Reno brothers
- Debra Paget as Cathy Reno, Clint's wife
- Elvis Presley as Clint, youngest of the brothers
- Mildred Dunnock as Martha Reno, the brothers' mother
- William Campbell as Brett, second oldest of the brothers
- James Drury as Ray, second youngest of the brothers
- Neville Brand as Mike Gavin, Vance's war buddy
- Russ Conway as Ed Galt, Vance's war buddy
- L. Q. Jones as Pardee Fleming, Vance's war buddy (uncredited)
- Robert Middleton as Mr. Siringo
- Bruce Bennett as Major Kincaid
- Ken Clark as Mr. Kelso
- Barry Coe as Mr. Davis
- Paul E. Burns as Jethro (uncredited)
- Dick Sargent as Confederate Soldier (uncredited)

== Production ==
=== Development ===
The film was originally called The Reno Brothers based on a story by Maurice Geraghty. Fox bought the screen rights in August 1952 and assigned Robert L. Jacks to produce.

The film was not put into production immediately. A somewhat more realistic film telling the story of the Reno Brothers, Rage at Dawn starring Randolph Scott, had been released by RKO Radio Pictures in 1955.

Robert Buckner wrote a script and David Weisbart became a producer with Robert D. Webb to direct. In August 1956, Richard Egan signed to play the lead. Debra Paget was also signed before Presley.

Producer Weisbert said "we signed Elvis later for the younger brother (at $100,000) when we heard he was available."

==== Casting Presley ====
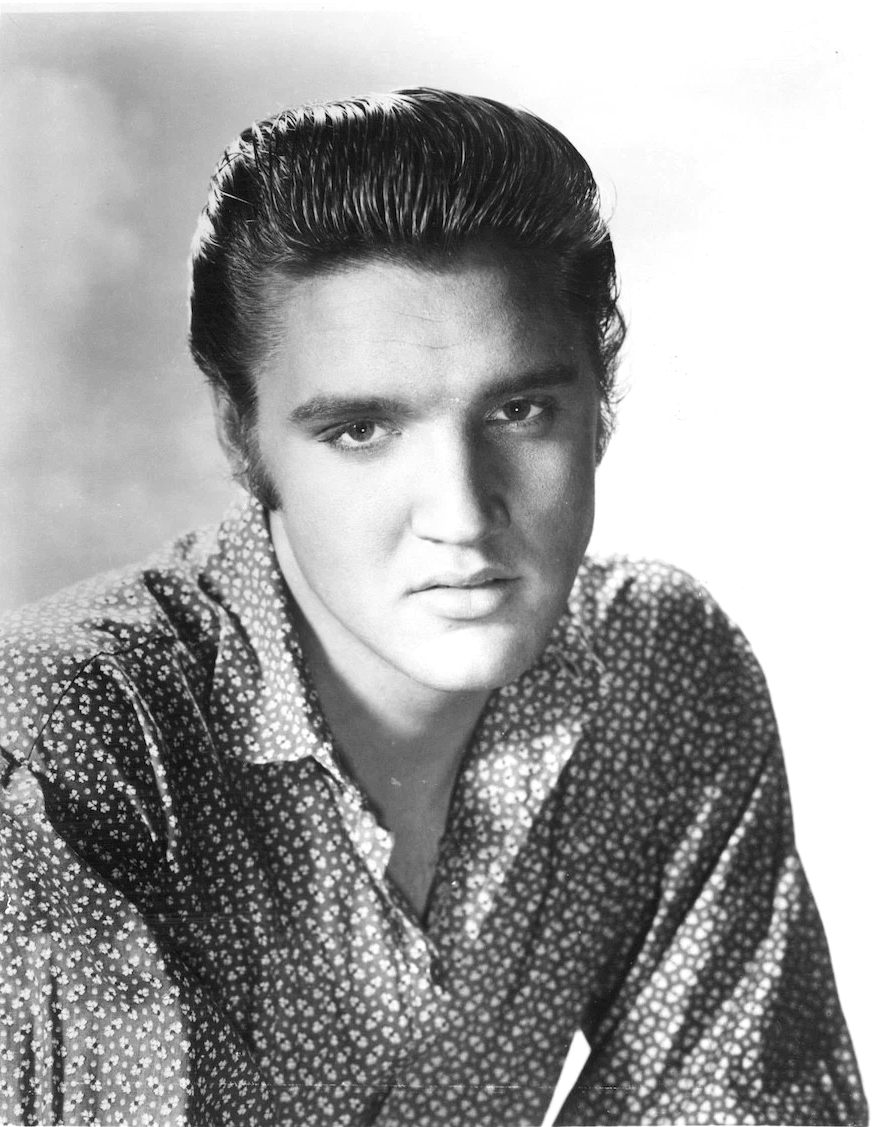
Elvis Presley as Clint

Presley had shown interest in becoming an actor before achieving major success as a singer. His first No. 1 hit single, "Heartbreak Hotel", topped Billboard's Top 100 chart in April 1956, a few weeks after his screen test for this film. He had worked as a cinema usher in his youth and would often watch his screen idols James Dean, Marlon Brando, and Tony Curtis during shifts, studying their acting and learning lines from their movies. When he first met his future manager, Colonel Tom Parker, he expressed an interest in acting in film.

In interviews during his rise to fame, Presley would often talk about his hopes of attending somewhere like the Actors Studio. He also insisted that he would not like to sing in any of his movies because he wished to be taken seriously as a film star. However, Parker had a plan to cross-promote Presley's films with his music and this led to soundtracks being as important, if not moreso, than the scripts.

Presley screen-tested for Hal Wallis on March 26, 1956, at Paramount Studios. The test lasted three days and included Presley performing two scenes from The Rainmaker, and lip-synching to Blue Suede Shoes.

Wallis' partner, Joe Hazen, commented: "As a straight actor, the guy has great potentialities." His first screen test, a scene from the William Inge play The Girls of Summer, resulted in drama coach Charlotte Clary declaring to her class of students, "Now that is a natural born actor".

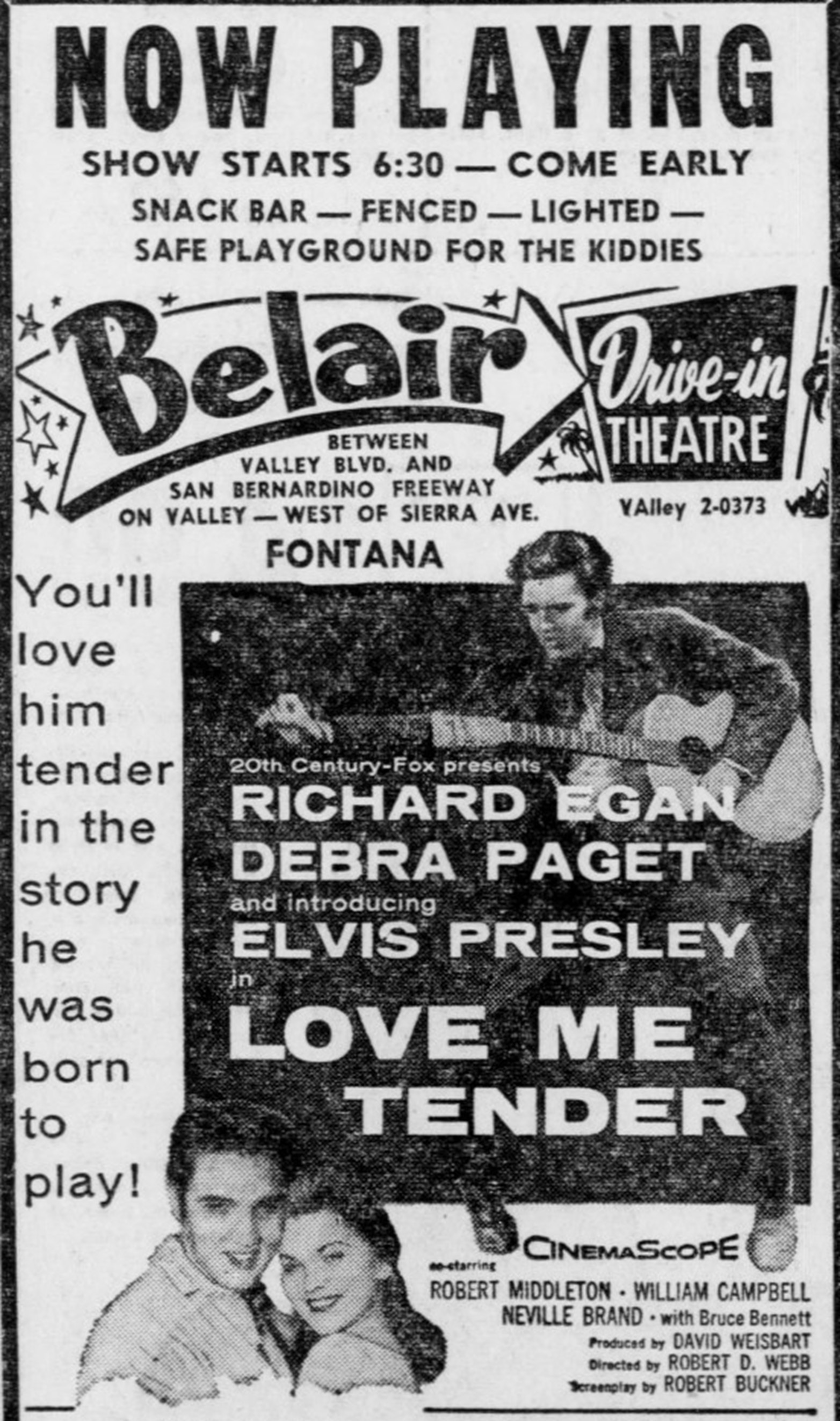
Drive-in advertisement from 1956

On April 2, Wallis offered Presley a contract for one motion picture, with options on six more. The contract was finalized on April 25, and also stipulated that Presley was free to make at least one picture a year for other studios.

Wallis, who had produced classics such as Casablanca, Little Caesar, and The Maltese Falcon, had promised Presley that he would look for dramatic roles to let the singer take his acting career seriously.

Wallis considered Presley for a role in The Rat Race, a film about a "naive, innocent boy" who was struggling to make it as a musician in Manhattan, but he decided against it after another studio executive said, "Elvis Presley just doesn't look like that". The film was eventually made in 1960 with Tony Curtis in the lead role. Another possibility Wallis mulled over was to pair Presley with Jerry Lewis. Lewis had just separated from his comedy partner Dean Martin after a successful run of seventeen movies together, but again the idea was shelved.

On April 10, Presley confidently announced during a radio interview that his debut feature would be The Rainmaker with Burt Lancaster and Katharine Hepburn. However, despite this belief, and due to Wallis being unable to find a project "good enough for the debut of Elvis Presley", he was loaned out to 20th Century Fox on August 13 and began work on Love Me Tender on August 22.

Presley's role had originally been turned down by both Jeffrey Hunter and Robert Wagner because the part was too small. According to Presley's then girlfriend, June Juanico, he was reluctant to take the role after realizing that his character died at the end, but he was persuaded to do it after she told him that the characters audiences were most likely to remember were the ones who had a tragic fate.

By August 17 Fox announced the four brothers would be played by James Drury, Cameron Mitchell, Presley and Egan. The New York Times called Presley's casting "somewhere between fantasy and drama" and said his next film would be for Paramount, The Lonesome Cowboy. William Campbell played another brother. Cameron Mitchell eventually turned down his role and was replaced by Neville Brand.

The moment Presley's casting was announced, Fox was deluged with queries about the film from Presley's fans. It was decided to expand his part and give him some songs to sing.

=== Filming ===
Presley arrived for filming with all of his lines learned, as well as the lines for all the other parts. He found filming quite taxing, once commenting to a friend that he had spent a whole day "behind a team of mules". In little more than a month Presley had recorded all the songs for the film and had finished filming his scenes.

Filming of the movie's climactic sequence, including the death scene for Presley's character, took place at the Bell Moving Picture Ranch in the Santa Susana Mountains west of the San Fernando Valley on the outskirts of Los Angeles. The exact filming location, sometimes referred to among historians as the "Rocky Hill", remained elusive for almost 60 years, until the site was discovered on an expedition by filming location researchers in early 2015. The party was able to locate the site by combining details from Love Me Tender and the Victor Mature movie Escort West, which also filmed on the "Rocky Hill."

Weibsart said during the shoot Presley was "humble, polite, solicitous... He was co operative with us, never late, and very serious about acting. This was another kind of career for him."

When Presley appeared on The Ed Sullivan Show during a break in filming the movie, on September 9, he performed "Love Me Tender" for the first time. Two weeks later RCA confirmed that advanced sales of the single had resulted in it going Gold before even being released—an industry first. (It sold one million copies pre ordered and ultimately ended up selling two million copies.)

On 2 September, Fox announced the film's title would be changed from The Reno Brothers to Love Me Tender.

"I think he provides tremendous additional value in the role", said Weisbart. "He will surprise a lot of people who go to see him because his presence is just a gimmick. Actually he plays an acting part in a legitimate story and he does it very well. He sings but the script is so constructed that the situations are logical... when the family is together after the war.... [or] at a bazar and picnic. These are folk tunes or hoedowns that – except for the title piece, a ballad – have Elvis' rhythms. With his long brown hair and sideburns he looks legitimate too in terms of the period."

=== Previews and reshoots ===
Test screenings of the film resulted in people being upset at the death of Presley's character. Attempting to reach a compromise between the death and pleasing his fans, Presley filmed an extra scene and recorded an extra verse to the title track to be played over the end credits.

== Release ==
Love Me Tender premiered on November 15, 1956, at the Paramount Theatre in New York City, and was released nationally on November 21. Though studios typically released were only 200-300 prints, 20th Century Fox released a record-breaking 575 prints. On November 20 Presley attended a private screening at Loew's State Theater in Memphis, during which his mother, Gladys, cried over the death of her son's character. Presley responded by insisting that his characters never die on screen again.

=== Box office ===
The film grossed $540,000 in its first week of release, claiming the No. 2 at the box office and earning back the money it cost the studio to produce it. Giant, starring James Dean, earned the No. 1 spot.

Within weeks Love Me Tender had recouped the costs of the negatives and, despite being released in November, was the 23rd highest-grossing film of the year.

=== Critical reception ===
Many critics gave the film a lukewarm reception, though some viewed it in a positive light. The Los Angeles Times wrote: "Elvis can act. S'help me the boy's real good, even when he isn't singing."

Presley would later express regret at making the film and disappointment that the additions of songs helped shape his Hollywood career.

In his book Me And A Guy Named Elvis, Jerry Schilling recounts the atmosphere inside Loew's State Theater in Memphis during the premiere screening: "The screams of the girls around me made it just about impossible to follow the story. This was the first time I'd seen an audience treat a film like it was a live concert, loudly responding to every move made and word uttered by their favorite star."

Presley would later tell his friend Cliff Gleaves that he found this type of reaction from his moviegoing fans embarrassing, and that it prevented him from being viewed as a serious actor.

== Soundtrack ==
The movie has four Elvis Presley songs: "Love Me Tender", "Let Me", "Poor Boy" and "We're Gonna Move."

== Home media ==
The film was released on videocassette by Key Video in February 1985 as part of the release of 11 videos to mark the 50th anniversary of Presley's birth. In the summer of 2006, the film was released on DVD in a special 50th anniversary issue. It was featured in a slipcase, and included a set of 4 lobby card reproductions. The disc contains the movie in its original widescreen letterbox format, plus audio commentary by noted Elvis historian, and Memphis Mafia member, Jerry Schilling. The disc includes three featurettes: "Elvis Hits Hollywood", "The Colonel & The King", and "Love Me Tender: The Birth & Boom of the Elvis Hit". Also part of the disc are original trailers for Love Me Tender, Flaming Star and Wild in the Country.

== See also ==
- List of American films of 1956
