= Joe Thomas (alto saxophonist) =

American musician (1908–1997)

Joe Thomas (Muskogee, Oklahoma, December 23, 1908 – April 15, 1997), was an American alto saxophonist and songwriter. He was the brother of Walter "Foots" Thomas. He first went to New York City with Jelly Roll Morton in 1929. He then worked with Blanche Calloway and other bands during the 1930s, and with jazz musician Dave Martin during the early 1940s. He gave up playing to become a vocal coach and songwriter and later an A&R executive.
