= I Don't Care If the Sun Don't Shine =

Original song written and composed by Mack David

"I Don't Care If the Sun Don't Shine" (sic) is a popular song written by Mack David. It was originally written for the Disney animated feature Cinderella, but was not used in the final print. The first recorded version was in 1949, on RCA Victor by Tony Martin and Henri Rene's Orchestra, on record number 20-3755. The most popular version was recorded by Patti Page in 1950. Page's recording was issued by Mercury Records as catalog number 5396, and first reached the Billboard chart on May 20, 1950, lasting nine weeks and peaking at number 8. It was her first Top 10 hit. She recorded the song again in 1959 for her album I'll Remember April.

== Elvis Presley version ==
"I Don't Care If the Sun Don't Shine"

Single by Elvis Presley
- A-side: "Good Rockin' Tonight"
- Released: September 25, 1954
- Recorded: September 1954
- Studio: Sun Studio
- Genre: Rockabilly; country
- Label: Sun
- Songwriter: Mack David
- Producer: Sam Phillips

Elvis Presley singles chronology
"That's All Right" (1954)	"I Don't Care If the Sun Don't Shine" (1954)	"You're a Heartbreaker" (1955)

The song was one of the first 19 recordings by Elvis Presley for Sun Records. In 1954, "I Don't Care If the Sun Don't Shine" was the second Sun Records release by Presley, along with "Good Rocking Tonight" on the A-side. He recorded it in mid-September 1954, and the single was released on September 25.

== Other cover versions ==
Dean Martin recorded the song for Capitol Records on March 28, 1950. While the song appears on several Beatles early pre-fame set lists, there are no extant recordings.

== In popular culture ==
A Dean Martin version of the song was featured in the 1953 film Scared Stiff starring Martin and Jerry Lewis. The Patti Page recording is featured in the movie The Adventures of Priscilla, Queen of the Desert. Guy Pearce also briefly sings excerpts of this song in the film, as does Terence Stamp and Hugo Weaving.
