= You're a Heartbreaker =

Single by Elvis Presley
- A-side: "Milkcow Blues Boogie"
- Released: January 8, 1955
- Recorded: December 8, 1954
- Genre: Rockabilly, country
- Length: 2:12
- Label: Sun; RCA Victor
- Songwriter: Jack Sallee
- Producer: Sam Phillips

Elvis Presley singles chronology
"Good Rockin' Tonight" (1954)	"You're a Heartbreaker" (1955)	"Baby, Let's Play House" (1955)

"You're a Heartbreaker" is a song recorded by Elvis Presley in December 1954 during the fourth of Presley's eight sessions at Memphis' Sun Studio. The recording was released as the B-side of Presley's third single on the Sun label (Sun 215), whose A-side was a cover of Kokomo Arnold's "Milkcow Blues Boogie".

== Session ==
The song was recorded "November or December, 1954" with personnel:

- Elvis Presley – lead vocals, acoustic rhythm guitar
- Scotty Moore – lead guitar
- Bill Black – double bass

The single was reissued on RCA Victor records (47-6382). It is listed as 2:10 minutes long, with the publisher Hill & Range BMI. It was also later included on Elvis' seventh studio album, For LP Fans Only in 1959.
