= Tryin' to Get to You =

1954 song by the Eagles

Single by the Eagles
- A-side: "Please, Please"
- Released: 1954
- Label: Mercury
- Songwriters: McCoy, Singleton

"Tryin' to Get to You"

Single by Elvis Presley

from the album Elvis Presley
- B-side: "I Love You Because"
- Released: August 31, 1956
- Recorded: July 11, 1955
- Studio: Sun, Memphis, Tennessee
- Genre: Rhythm and blues, rock and roll
- Length: 2:31
- Label: RCA Victor
- Songwriters: McCoy, Singleton

Elvis Presley singles chronology
| "I'll Never Let You Go (Little Darlin')" (1956) | "Tryin' to Get to You" (1956) | "Just Because" (1956) |

"Tryin' to Get to You"

Single by the Teen Kings / Vocal, Roy Orbison
- B-side: "Ooby Dooby"
- Released: March 1956
- Recorded: March 4, 1956
- Label: Je-Wel
- Songwriters: McCoy, Singleton

"Tryin' to Get to You" is a song written by R&B singer songwriters Rose Marie McCoy and Charles Singleton. It was originally recorded by the Washington DC vocal group the Eagles in 1954 and released in mid-1954 on Mercury Records 70391. The format of the title on the Eagles' record was "Tryin' to Get to You", with an apostrophe.

The song was also recorded by Elvis Presley in 1955 on his then unissued Sun recordings.

Presley recorded five versions of the song. The first on March 23, 1955, and the second on July 11, 1955, with the second session being released during his lifetime. He also recorded live versions of the song on Elvis (NBC TV Special), Elvis: As Recorded Live on Stage in Memphis, and Elvis in Concert. On the earlier version that appeared on the 1999 album, Sunrise, Presley recorded this song while simultaneously playing the piano (and not aided by his rhythm guitar, as previously believed). Because his piano playing was not up to the expected standards, producer Sam Phillips erased the sound of the piano on the master take so, in addition to Elvis' vocals, all one hears is the lead guitar, bass, and drums. Elvis' piano is heard on the July session version and appeared on his self-titled 1956 LP.

Presley's vocal delivery appears to be influenced by that of the Eagles' lead singer, although taking the two warbles at 0.56 and 2.12 one step forward by extending his vocals so that they meet, then join (and without any stops nor breathing space in between), the first and second verses. In addition, Scotty Moore's guitar solo on the Presley recording replaces a saxophone solo heard on the original.

The track was released on Presley's March 1956 RCA debut album Elvis Presley. It also featured on the famous 1976 The Sun Sessions release and on numerous other Elvis efforts and collections as well.

"Trying To Get To You" was next released by the Teen Kings with Roy Orbison in March 1956 as Je-Wel JE-101 backed with "Ooby Dooby" on the B-side. A version by Johnny Carroll also then ensued, being made on Decca Records on May 19, 1956 (Decca 9–29940).

Ricky Nelson was the next to give treatment of the song in 1959.

After Eric Burdon performed it a few times on his own shows he reunited with the Animals in 1983 and recorded the song in the studio. It appeared on their album Ark. It was also included on their live shows before they disbanded again in early 1984.

Later it was also covered by Johnny Rivers, Faith Hill, Susie Arioli, Gene Summers, Phil Seymour, and many others.

The song was adapted by Paul McCartney to create "In Spite of All the Danger", the first ever original song recorded by the Quarrymen, the precursor to the Beatles.
