= Lead instrument =

The term lead instrument carries a variety of connotations. A lead instrument could be a reference to an instrument that plays the melody of a piece, an instrument that has been designed for this purpose, such as clarinet or violin, or a specific member of an orchestra that is featured as the most proficient musician of the group. In the digital music composition, lead may refer to the tone quality that is applied to a signal.

== Melody and harmony ==
Melody may be described as a phrase or collection of musical notes played in succession. Rhythm, or harmony, occurs when one or more notes are played at the same time. A lead instrument is usually monophonic (only able to sound one note at a time), such as a horn or voice. A rhythm or backing instrument(s) may be monophonic, working together to create harmony, or polyphonic, generating harmony on its own.

== Orchestra ==
The name given to someone who is the most advanced player of their instrument in their ensemble is the first chair or principal. Because the first chair is the leader of their section of instruments, much practice and skill is required to fill this position. In an Orchestra, musicians are divided into sections by their instruments. Within these sections, the individual musicians are arranged in terms of their technical prowess. For example, a first chair violinist will lead the violins playing the melody while another row might play the harmony.

== Examples of lead instruments ==
Some instruments that commonly take lead are:

- Voice / Vocals
- Guitar / Electric Guitar / Acoustic Guitar / Classical Guitar
- Bass
- Trumpet
- Flute
- Clarinet
- Saxophone
- Violin
- Keyboard
- Banjo
- Viola
- Cello
- Harmonica
- Whistle
- Trombone
- Bassoon
- Oboe
- Sitar
- Recorder
- Erhu
- Ocarina
- Keytar
- Talkbox

== Digital music ==
In addition, monosynth synthesizer patches are often called leads, for their frequent use on melody parts in dance and electronic music. These patches are often legato, meaning filters and modulation are continued across a series of held notes, and portamento can be used to create a pitch bend transition up or down to other notes.
