= Arthur Gunter =

American songwriter (1926–1976)

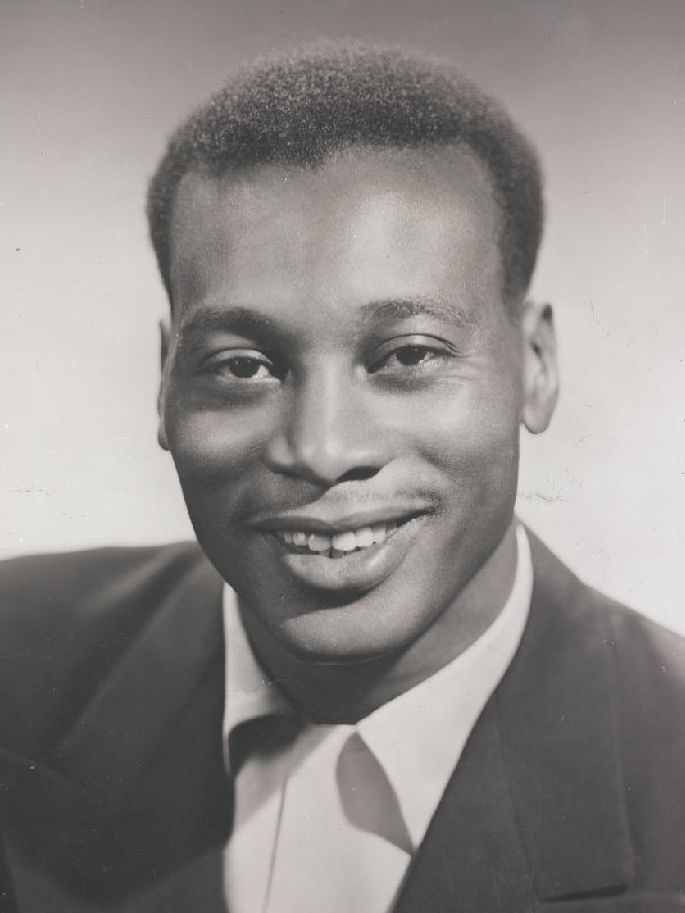
- Publicity photo of Arthur Gunter

Background information
- Born: Arthur Neal Gunter; May 23, 1926; Vesta, Oglethorpe County, Georgia, U.S.
- Died: March 16, 1976 (aged 49) Port Huron, Michigan, U.S.
- Genres: Blues, R&B
- Occupations: Singer, guitarist
- Years active: c. 1950 – 1973
- Label: Excello

Arthur Neal Gunter (May 23, 1926 – March 16, 1976) was an American blues guitarist and musician. He was best known for his song "Baby Let's Play House", which was later a hit single for Elvis Presley.

== Biography ==
Gunter was born in Oglethorpe County, Georgia. As a child, he was in a gospel group with his brothers and cousins called the Gunter Brothers Quartet. In the early 1950s, he played in various blues groups around Nashville, Tennessee, and began recording for Excello Records in 1954.

In November 1954, Gunter recorded "Baby Let's Play House" for Excello (2047), which not only became a local hit, but peaked at number 12 in the US Billboard R&B chart. It became better nationally known the next year, when Elvis Presley recorded a version for Sun Records.

Gunter continued to record for Excello until 1961. His regular band broke up in 1966 and he moved to Pontiac, Michigan, performing only occasionally thereafter. He retired after winning the Michigan State Lottery in 1973.

He died of pneumonia in 1976, aged 49, at his home in Port Huron, Michigan.

== Reissues ==
No album was issued on Excello until the 1971 Black and Blues (LP-8017). In 1995, Excello/AVI issued the CD, Baby Let's Play House (CD-3011). In 2015, Japanese Oldays issued a limited edition 23 track CD, Baby Let's Play House. Also in late 2016, UK Jasmine issued an Arthur Gunter CD, also called Baby Let's Play House.

== Bibliography ==
- Reif, Fred (1995). Arthur Gunter. Baby Let's Play House: the Best of Arthur Gunter (pp. 3–6) [CD liner notes]. Los Angeles: Excello Records
