= Good Rocking Tonight =

1947 single by Roy Brown

"Good Rockin' Tonight"

Single by Roy Brown
- B-side: "Lolly Pop Mama"
- Released: 1947
- Recorded: 1947
- Studio: J&M (New Orleans, Louisiana)
- Genre: Jump blues; R&B
- Length: 2:57
- Label: De Luxe
- Songwriter: Roy Brown

Roy Brown singles chronology
"Good Rockin' Tonight" (1947)	"Long About Midnight" (1947)

"Good Rocking Tonight" is a jump blues song originally released in 1947 by its writer, Roy Brown and was covered by many recording artists (sometimes as Good Rockin' Tonight). The song includes the memorable refrain, "Well I heard the news, there's good rocking tonight!" The song anticipated elements of rock and roll music.

Some reviewers state that Brown's version, or Wynonie Harris' (depending on the source), is one of the contenders for the title of "first rock'n'roll record". The label of the 45 RPM record by Brown included the words "Rocking blues". In 2022, Brown's recording was inducted into the Blues Hall of Fame in the 'Classics of Blues Recording – Singles' category.

== Original song ==
Roy Brown had first offered his song to Wynonie Harris, who turned it down. He then approached Cecil Gant later that night, but after hearing Brown sing, Gant made a 2:30 AM phone call to Jules Braun, the president of De Luxe Records. After Brown sang his song over the phone, Braun asked Brown to sing it a second time. He then told Gant, "Give him fifty dollars and don't let him out of your sight." According to the Paul McCartney Project, "Harris’s version was even more energetic than Brown’s original version, featuring black gospel style handclapping".

Five weeks later, Brown recorded the song for De Luxe Records. Only after Brown's record had gained traction in New Orleans did Harris decide to cover it. Harris' more energetic version may have contributed to the composition's greater success on the national R&B chart. Brown's original recording hit No. 13 of the Billboard R&B chart, but Harris' record became a No. 1 R&B hit and remained on the chart for half a year. Brown's single would re-enter the chart in 1949, peaking at No. 11. Harris had a reputation for carousing, and sometimes forgot lyrics. His "Good Rockin'" recording session largely followed Brown's original lyrics, but by the end, he replaced the last section with a series of raucous "hoy hoy hoy!" interjections, a commonly used expression in jump blues tunes of the time, going back to 1945's "The Honeydripper" by Joe Liggins.

The song is a primer of sorts on the popular black music of the era, making lyrical reference to Sweet Lorraine, Sioux City Sue, Sweet Georgia Brown, Caldonia, Elder Brown, and Deacon Jones. All of these characters had figured prominently in previous hit songs. The song has also been credited with being the most successful record to that point to use the word "rock" not as a euphemism for sex, but as a descriptive for the musical style, a connection which would become even clearer in 1954 when a version of "Good Rockin' Tonight" became Elvis Presley's second-ever single.

While Brown missed out on the biggest hit version of his song, its success kicked off his own career, which included two No. 1 R&B hits. In 1949, he released "Rockin' at Midnight", a sequel to "Good Rockin' Tonight." It reached No. 2 on the R&B chart, where it remained for a month.

== Elvis Presley version ==
"Good Rockin' Tonight"
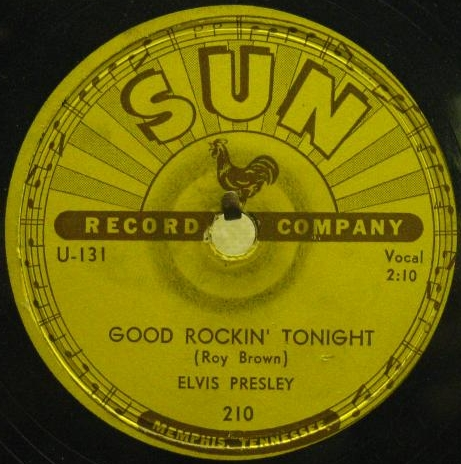

Single by Elvis Presley
- B-side: "I Don't Care If the Sun Don't Shine"
- Released: September 25, 1954
- Recorded: September 10, 1954
- Genre: Rockabilly; rhythm and blues
- Length: 2:14
- Label: Sun
- Songwriter: Roy Brown
- Producer: Sam Phillips

Elvis Presley singles chronology
"That's All Right" (1954)	"Good Rockin' Tonight" (1954)	"Milkcow Blues Boogie" (1955)

In 1954, "Good Rockin' Tonight" was the second Sun Records release by Elvis Presley, along with "I Don't Care if the Sun Don't Shine" on the flip side. Presley and his bandmates' version is an almost word-for-word cover of Harris' version but omitted the lyrics' by-then-dated roster of names in favor of a simpler, more energetic "We're gonna rock, rock, rock!" Despite its later importance, the single did not sell well when it was released.

Similar to Wynonie Harris' 1948 version, Presley added even greater "exuberance and drive" to the "rockabilly" song, but the 1954 version did not prove to be as successful.

The song was used for the 2005 biographical miniseries Elvis, which starred Jonathan Rhys-Meyers as Presley; it was used for a montage sequence where he is performing at the Louisiana Hayride in 1954.

Region	Certification	Certified units/sales
United States (RIAA)	Gold	500,000^{^}
^{^} Shipments figures based on certification alone.

=== Personnel ===
- Elvis Presley – lead vocals, acoustic rhythm guitar
- Scotty Moore – electric lead guitar (Gibson ES-295)
- Bill Black – double bass

== Other renditions ==
- Pat Boone's version rose to number 49 on the Billboard Hot 100 in February 1959.
- Jerry Lee Lewis recorded the song twice at Sun in March 1958 and in June 1962.
- The Doors (without Jim Morrison) recorded a cover version titled "Good Rockin'" for their 1972 studio album Full Circle.
- Montrose created a hard rock version of the song on its 1973 debut album Montrose.
- The song was a setlist staple during Bruce Springsteen and the E Street Band's 1978 Darkness Tour. A recording of the performance in at the Capitol Theater in Passaic, New Jersey, on September 20, 1978, is included on the official live audio recording of that concert. The song occasionally featured in subsequent Springsteen concerts, with the most recent rendition taking place at Citizens Bank Park in Philadelphia, Pennsylvania on September 2, 2012 during the Wrecking Ball World Tour.
- When Led Zeppelin singer Robert Plant recorded an EP with some friends in 1984, calling the band the Honeydrippers, he focused on a "roots of rock" sound. The EP The Honeydrippers: Volume One featured the renamed "Rockin' at Midnight" as its first single, with a strong boogie woogie feel. It reached number 25 on the Billboard Hot 100.
- Commander Cody and his Lost Planet Airmen included the song on "Live from Deep in the Heart of Texas" in 1974. It features Billy C. Farlow on lead vocals and Bill Kirchen on lead guitar.
