= Ken Darby =

American composer (1909–1992)

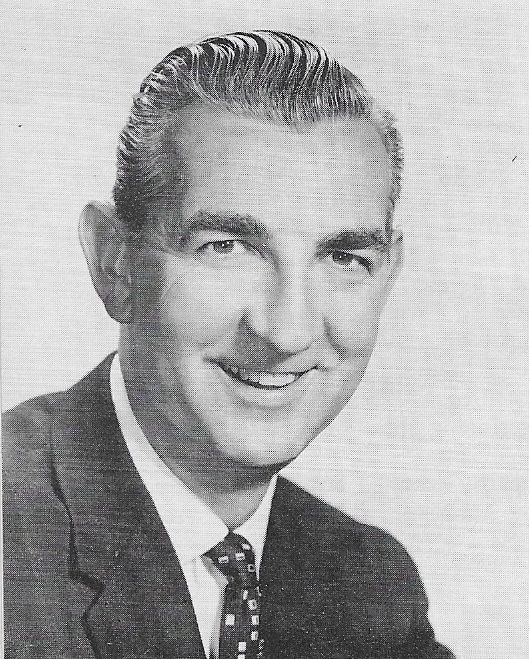
- Born: Kenneth Lorin Darby; May 13, 1909; Hebron, Nebraska, U.S.
- Died: January 24, 1992 (aged 82); Sherman Oaks, California, U.S.
- Resting place: Forest Lawn Memorial Park (Hollywood Hills)
- Occupations: Composer; vocal arranger; lyricist; conductor
- Spouse: Vera Matson (m. 1932–1992)

Kenneth Lorin Darby (May 13, 1909 – January 24, 1992) was an American composer, vocal arranger, lyricist, and conductor. His film scores were recognized by the awarding of three Academy Awards and one Grammy Award. Darby is also notable as the author of The Brownstone House of Nero Wolfe (1983), a biography of the home of Rex Stout's fictional detective.

== Personal life ==
Kenneth Lorin Darby was born in Hebron, Nebraska, on May 13, 1909, to Lorin Edward Darby and Clara Alice Powell. Darby was married to Vera Matson from 1932 to his death in 1992.

== Career ==
Ken Darby's choral group, The Ken Darby Singers, sang backup for Bing Crosby on the original 1942 Decca Records studio recording of "White Christmas." In 1940 they also sang on the first album ever made of the songs from The Wizard of Oz, a film on which Darby had worked. However, the album was a studio cast recording, not a true soundtrack album (although it did feature Judy Garland), and it did not use the film's original arrangements.

1956 sheet music for "Love Me Tender", Elvis Presley Music

Darby also performed as part of "The King's Men," a vocal quartet who recorded several songs with Paul Whiteman's orchestra in the mid-1930s and were the featured vocalists on the Fibber McGee and Molly radio program from 1940 through 1953. In the early 1940s, he performed with the King's Men a musical version of "A Visit from St. Nicholas" that he wrote called "T'was the Night Before Christmas" that was performed on the Christmas episodes of Fibber McGee and Molly. They also participated on the soundtracks of several MGM films, including The Wizard of Oz and occasional Tom and Jerry cartoons. The King's Men portrayed the Marx Brothers in a musical spoof in the film Honolulu (Darby played one of two 'Grouchos' in the group). He also provided the theme song and the soundtrack for The Life and Legend of Wyatt Earp, the 1955-61 television series starring Hugh O'Brian, The Adventures of Jim Bowie starring Scott Forbes, and The Californians.

He was a composer and production supervisor for Walt Disney Studios and was choral and vocal director on the 1946 Disney film classic Song of the South.

He was also Marilyn Monroe's vocal coach for Gentlemen Prefer Blondes (1953) and There's No Business Like Show Business (1954).

Darby was also the principal composer of the 1956 Elvis Presley hit "Love Me Tender" for the movie of the same name but signed the rights over to his wife, Vera Matson, whose name appears as co-lyricist and co-composer with Presley. The song was adapted from the Civil War-era song "Aura Lee." Presley's composing credit was mandated by his management, to entice him to record the song. Darby was often asked about his decision to credit the song to his wife along with Presley, and his standard response was an acid, "Because she didn't write it either." In actuality, Ken Darby wasn't credited because he was represented by another musicians association.

A fan of Nero Wolfe, Rex Stout's fictional detective genius, Darby wrote a biography of Wolfe's home titled The Brownstone House of Nero Wolfe (1983).

Ken Darby died January 24, 1992, in the final stages of production of his last book, Hollywood Holyland: The Filming and Scoring of 'The Greatest Story Ever Told' (1992).

He was buried at the Forest Lawn, Hollywood Hills Cemetery in Los Angeles.

== Awards ==
=== Academy Awards ===
- 1956, Winner, Best Scoring of a Musical Picture
  The King and I
  (shared with Alfred Newman)
  Academy of Motion Picture Arts and Sciences
- 1958, Nominee, Best Scoring of a Musical Picture
  South Pacific
  (shared with Alfred Newman)
  Academy of Motion Picture Arts and Sciences
- 1959, Winner, Best Scoring of a Musical Picture
  Porgy and Bess
  (shared with André Previn)
  Academy of Motion Picture Arts and Sciences
- 1961, Nominee, Best Scoring of a Musical Picture
  Flower Drum Song
  (shared with Alfred Newman)
  Academy of Motion Picture Arts and Sciences
- 1963, Nominee, Best Original Music Score
  How the West Was Won
  (shared with Alfred Newman)
  Academy of Motion Picture Arts and Sciences
- 1967, Winner, Best Score – Adaptation or Treatment
  Camelot
  (shared with Alfred Newman)
  Academy of Motion Picture Arts and Sciences

=== Grammy Awards ===
- 1960, Winner, Best Soundtrack Album, Original Cast, Movie or Television
  Porgy and Bess
  (shared with André Previn)
  National Academy of Recording Arts and Sciences
