= The Blue Caps =

1950's American rock and roll band

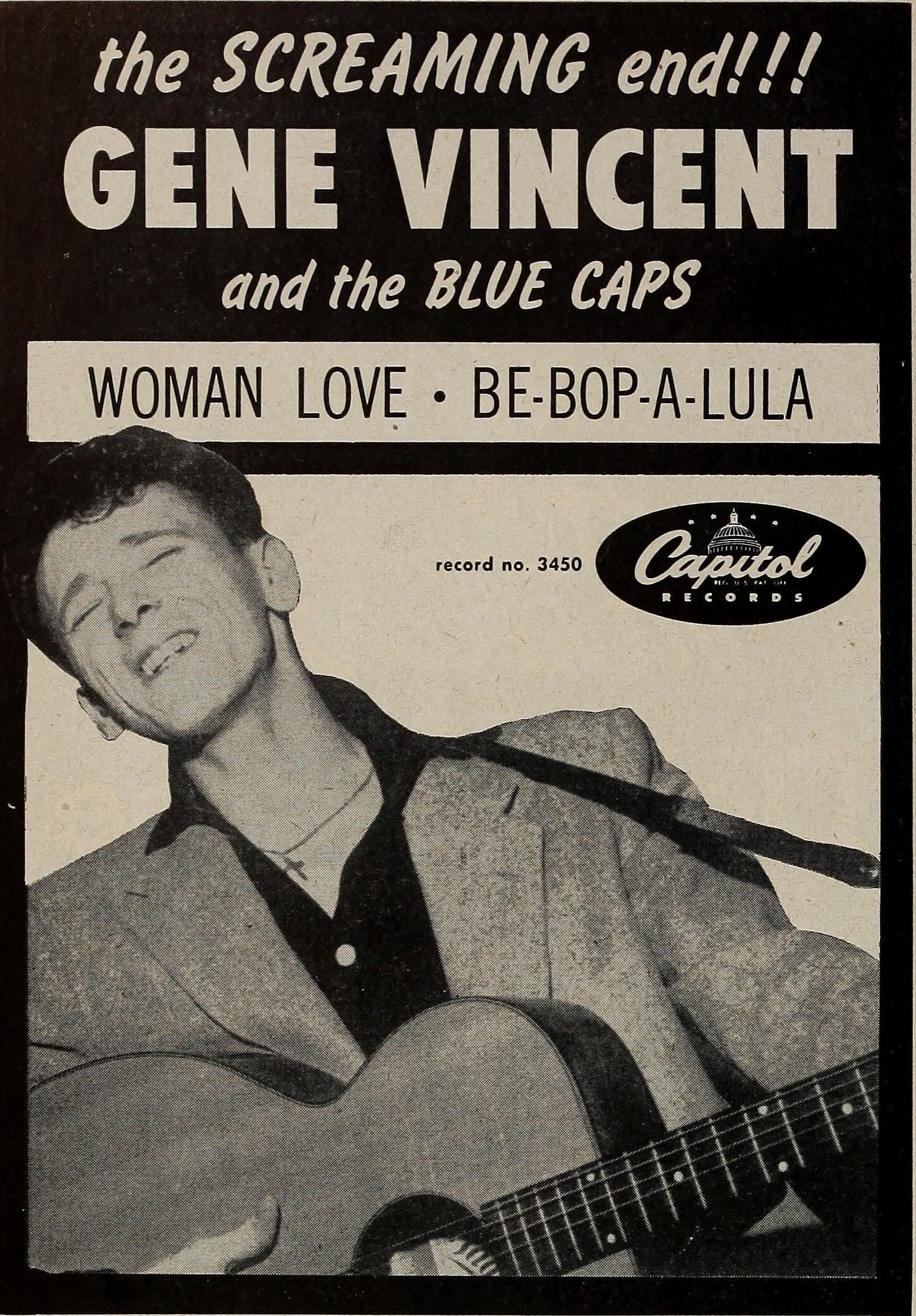
- 1956 Cashbox advertisement for "Be-Bop-a-Lula", Gene Vincent and the Blue Caps' biggest hit

Background information
- Also known as: Gene Vincent and The Blue Caps; Gene Vincent and his Blue Caps
- Origin: Norfolk, Virginia, U.S.
- Genres: Rockabilly; rock and roll; country
- Years active: c.1956 - c.1959
- Labels: Capitol; Columbia
- Past members: Gene Vincent; Cliff Gallup; Tommy Facenda; Paul Peek; Willie Williams; Johnny Meeks; Jack Neal; Dickie Harrell; Juvy Gomez; Clyde Pennington; Bill Mack; Max Lipscomb; Grady Owen; Jerry Merritt

The Blue Caps were a pioneering American rock and roll band of the 1950s, the backing band for early rockabilly icon Gene Vincent. They were inducted into the Rock and Roll Hall of Fame in 2012, as part of a class of overlooked backing bands selected by a special committee.

Robert Burke Warren, writing for the Hall of Fame, called them "One of the first self-contained rock & roll bands", while Rolling Stone has called them "The first rock & roll band in the world".

Members inducted into the Hall of Fame were guitarists Cliff Gallup, Tommy "Bubba" Facenda, Paul Peek, Willie Williams, and Johnny Meeks; bassists Bobby Jones and Jack Neal; and drummer Dickie Harrell, who died in 2023. Drummers Juvy Gomez and Clyde Pennington, bassist Bill Mack, piano player Max Lipscomb, and guitarists Grady Owen and Jerry Merritt were also members at various times.

Vincent knocked the lights out of every stage he hit, and his Blue Caps picked up the pieces and threw them out the window.

— Rockabilly Legends

The Blue Caps appeared, backing Gene Vincent, in the movies The Girl Can't Help It (1956) and Hot Rod Gang (1958). The Blue Caps wore flat light blue caps on stage.

The Blue Caps disbanded before the end of the 1950s, but reformed with original members Meeks, Peek, Harrell, Jones, and Facenda for a 1982 tour of England and a new record.

== Discography ==
=== With Gene Vincent ===
- Bluejean Bop! (1956, Columbia)
- Gene Vincent and the Blue Caps (1957, Capitol T811, US & UK)
- Gene Vincent Rocks! And the Blue Caps Roll! (1958, Capitol – T-970, US & UK)

=== Solo ===
- Unleashed (1982, Magnum Force)
- On The Road Again (1984, Magnum Force, MFLP – 1020)
- The Blue Caps – Hep To The Beat With The Blue Caps & Friends (2004, Pollytone – PEPCD 119, UK)
