= Fallen Angels (Bob Dylan album) =

2016 studio album by Bob Dylan

Studio album by Bob Dylan
- Released: May 20, 2016
- Recorded: 2014
- Studio: Capitol (Hollywood)
- Genres: Traditional pop; jazz
- Length: 37:50
- Label: Columbia
- Producer: Jack Frost

Bob Dylan chronology
The Bootleg Series Vol. 12: The Cutting Edge 1965–1966 (2015)	Fallen Angels (2016)	The 1966 Live Recordings (2016)

Bob Dylan studio album chronology
Shadows in the Night (2015)	Fallen Angels (2016)	Triplicate (2017)

Singles from Fallen Angels
- 1. "Melancholy Mood" Released: April 7, 2016

Fallen Angels is the thirty-seventh studio album by Bob Dylan, released by Columbia Records on May 20, 2016.

The album consists of cover versions of twelve classic American songs chosen by Dylan from a diverse array of writers such as Johnny Mercer, Harold Arlen, Sammy Cahn, and Carolyn Leigh. Much like the album's predecessor, Shadows in the Night, every song on the album, except for "Skylark", was once recorded by Frank Sinatra.

The album received generally favorable reviews from critics, with particular praise for Dylan's vocal performance, production quality, and the arrangements of his band. Fallen Angels received a nomination for Best Traditional Pop Vocal Album at the 59th Annual Grammy Awards, held in February 2017.

== Recording ==
Fallen Angels was recorded in 2014 at Capitol Studios in Hollywood, with Dylan's touring band (augmented by a three-piece horn section and guitarist Dean Parks), during the same sessions at which they recorded Shadows in the Night. The album was engineered and mixed by Al Schmitt and produced by Dylan under his pseudonym Jack Frost.

== Release and promotion ==
Fallen Angels was released by Columbia Records on May 20, 2016. The first indication of the album's existence had come more than a year earlier, however, when producer Daniel Lanois told the Vancouver Sun in February 2015 that Dylan had visited him at home, played him "21 songs" and indicated that "he’s made two records of this (Sinatra project)".

Prior to release, on April 7, 2016, the song "Melancholy Mood" was made available on iTunes as an Instant Gratification track, and via streaming on YouTube. On April 28, 2016, the day Dylan concluded a tour of Japan, a second track from the album, "All the Way", became available to download from iTunes and stream on YouTube.

In promotion for the release, Dylan released a 7" single on April 7, 2016 for the song "Melancholy Mood", which was limited to 7000 copies.

== Artwork ==
The album's front cover features a cropped version of a vintage black-and-white photograph of a man holding a poker hand that was originally taken in 1928. According to Dylan scholar Alan Fraser: "[T]he deck was made by the famous playing card manufacturer Andrew Dougherty (the same guy who made the famous Tally Ho decks which are still in production today). Furthermore, the name of the back design is called 'Chinese Dragon Back No. 81'". The font used for the album's title is Caslon Black. The boxing photo on the rear of the inner sleeve depicts the fight between Jake LaMotta and Billy Fox at Madison Square Garden in New York City on November 14, 1947 (a fight dramatized in Martin Scorsese's 1980 film Raging Bull). As with many of Dylan albums in the 21st century, the packaging features minimal credits and no printed lyrics.

== Reception and legacy ==
Professional ratings
Aggregate scores
Source	Rating
AnyDecentMusic?	7.0/10
Metacritic	77/100
Review scores
Source	Rating
AllMusic	4/5 stars
The A.V. Club	B+
Entertainment Weekly	B+
Flood Magazine	5/10
The Independent	4/5 stars
Now	5/5 stars
Paste	8.5/10
Pitchfork Media	6.4/10
PopMatters	7/10 stars
The Telegraph	5/5 stars

Fallen Angels received mostly positive reviews from critics. At Metacritic, which assigns a normalized rating out of 100 to reviews from critics, the album currently holds an average score of 77, which indicates "generally favorable reviews", based on 21 reviews.

Particular praise has been heaped on the band arrangements, production, and Dylan's voice. In a four-star review, Andy Gill of The Independent wrote, "the restrained picking and creamy pedal-steel guitar of his live band imposes a smooth but demotic country mood behind Dylan’s elegant, world-weary croon". Likewise, Jim Farber of Entertainment Weekly wrote, "Dylan alights on these words [the lyrics] with a wry delicacy. His voice may be husky and damaged from decades of performing, but there’s beauty to its character. Tellingly, he delivers these songs of love lost and cherished not with a burning passion but with the wistfulness of experience". Helen Brown in her five-star review for The Daily Telegraph also praised Dylan's vocal abilities on the album, stating, "Although some people have always maintained that Dylan 'can't sing', the truth is that—like Sinatra—he's always had a knockout knack for putting a lyric across... Now he inhabits classic lines by songwriters like Johnny Mercer with weathered ease".

Vish Khanna of Now Magazine also praised the album, in a five-star review, writing, "Fallen Angels is a hazy, laid-back history lesson with as many enigmatic twists and turns as a classic double-cross caper. It subverts archetypes of romance, heroism and interpersonal connection to reveal something more sinister about human intent, all packaged in beautiful musicianship of the highest order."

In relation to the idea of Dylan covering songs from the Great American Songbook, Mat Snow of Mojo Magazine writes in a four-star review:

What Dylan gives us in these recordings is something of a sentimental memoir...aged four at a family party he brought the house down with his renditions of Ac-Cent-Tchu-Ate the Positive and Some Sunday Morning...with seemingly nothing in common with his thrillingly modern yet deep-rooted songs two decades later...Yet he has form as a writer in this idiom in such songs as 2001’s Moonlight, arguably even 1969’s Tonight I'll Be Staying Here with You.

Also praising the concept behind Fallen Angels and its predecessor, Shadows in the Night, Stephen Thomas Erlewine of AllMusic wrote:

These wise, wily interpretations underscore Dylan's ultimate aim with these Sinatra records, which is to slyly tie together various strands of American music, bringing Tin Pan Alley to the barrooms and taking the backwoods uptown. The results are understated yet extraordinary, an idiosyncratic, romantic vision of 20th century America.

Jon M. Gilbertson, in a review from Milwaukee Journal Sentinel, opines, "Fallen Angels, like last year's Shadows in the Night, teases out threads of Sinatra sentimentality — Frank recorded nearly all the songs on both discs — and winds them around a voice that is desiccated in tone and tune but, in phrasing and emotion, can still find romantic blossoms among the painful thorns". Likewise, Andy Gill of Uncut Magazine, in a positive review of 8 stars out of 10, also related the album to Shadows in the Night, feeling that "Dylan has continued to restrict his choice to those songs which conform loosely to a mood of weary resignation, extending the engaging crepuscular mood of Shadows in the Night".

However, Chris Gerard, writing for PopMatters, felt that the album did not quite live up to the standard set by Dylan's previous Great American Songbook project, Shadows in the Night, writing, in an otherwise positive review, "It’s not on the same level as Shadows in the Night, which is darker, more emotionally intense and an altogether more potent experience. At times Fallen Angels feels a bit lightweight in comparison. Still, it’s a touching tribute to Dylan’s continued passion for music, his love of performing and a celebration of some damn good songs".

The Big Issue listed the song "Melancholy Mood", the album's lone single and tenth track, as #56 on a list of the "80 best Bob Dylan songs - that aren't the greatest hits". It was the only track from Dylan's three albums exploring the Great American Songbook (among 52 from which to choose), that made the list. Critic Ray Padgett also cited "Melancholy Mood" as the highlight of Fallen Angels. It was the only track from the album to make his list of the ten best covers from Dylan's American Songbook albums. Padgett placed the song seventh on the list, writing that it "rides a slow drum shuffle to deliver a Bob vocal that underplays the emotion perfectly". NJArts critic Jay Lustig wrote that while he didn't consider Fallen Angels to be a "particularly notable addition to Dylan's vast catalog", there is "something to be said for resurrecting a forgotten gem such as 'Melancholy Mood'", which Lustig cited as his favorite track on the album.

=== Accolades ===
Publication	Accolade	Year	Rank
Mojo	The 50 Best Albums of 2016	2016	20

Dylan was also nominated for the Grammy award for Best Traditional Pop Vocal for the second year in a row (following the successful Shadows in the Night).

== Track listing ==
Fallen Angels track listing
No.	Title	Writer(s)	Length
1.	"Young at Heart"	Johnny Richards, Carolyn Leigh	3:00
2.	"Maybe You’ll Be There"	Rube Bloom, Sammy Gallop	2:56
3.	"Polka Dots and Moonbeams"	Jimmy Van Heusen, Johnny Burke	3:20
4.	"All the Way"	Jimmy Van Heusen, Sammy Cahn	4:00
5.	"Skylark"	Hoagy Carmichael, Johnny Mercer	2:56
6.	"Nevertheless"	Harry Ruby, Bert Kalmar	3:27
7.	"All or Nothing at All"	Arthur Altman, Jack Lawrence	3:04
8.	"On a Little Street in Singapore"	Peter DeRose, Billy Hill	2:15
9.	"It Had to Be You"	Isham Jones, Gus Kahn	3:40
10.	"Melancholy Mood"	Walter Schumann, Vick R. Knight Sr.	2:53
11.	"That Old Black Magic"	Harold Arlen, Johnny Mercer	3:04
12.	"Come Rain or Come Shine"	Arlen, Mercer	2:36

== Personnel ==
Adapted from the liner notes.

- Bob Dylan – vocals

Additional musicians

- Charlie Sexton – guitar
- Stu Kimball – guitar
- Dean Parks – guitar
- Donnie Herron – steel guitar, viola
- Tony Garnier – bass guitar
- George Receli – drums

Production and design

- Al Schmitt – mixing and engineering
- Steve Genewick – assistant engineering
- James Harper – horn arrangements/conducting
- Greg Calbi – mastering
- Geoff Gans – album artwork

== Charts ==
=== Weekly charts ===
Chart (2016)	Peak position
Australian Albums (ARIA)	11
Austrian Albums (Ö3 Austria)	1
Belgian Albums (Ultratop Flanders)	3
Belgian Albums (Ultratop Wallonia)	24
Canadian Albums (Billboard)	24
Czech Albums (ČNS IFPI)	2
Danish Albums (Hitlisten)	19
Dutch Albums (Album Top 100)	7
Finnish Albums (Suomen virallinen lista)	14
French Albums (SNEP)	35
German Albums (Offizielle Top 100)	7
Greek Albums (IFPI)	12
Irish Albums (IRMA)	5
Italian Albums (FIMI)	14
Italian Vinyl Records (FIMI)	2
New Zealand Albums (RMNZ)	11
Norwegian Albums (VG-lista)	8
Polish Albums (ZPAV)	22
Swedish Albums (Sverigetopplistan)	5
Swiss Albums (Schweizer Hitparade)	4
UK Albums (Official Charts)	5
US Billboard 200	7
US Top Rock Albums (Billboard)	2

=== Year-end charts ===
Chart (2016)	Position
Belgian Albums (Ultratop Flanders)	91
US Top Rock Albums (Billboard)	51
