= Paul Peek =

Paul Peek may refer to:

- Paul Peek (musician)
- Paul Peek (politician)
