= Dwight Pullen =

American rockabilly and country musician (1931–1961)

- Also known as: Whitey Pullen
- Born: D'wight Arness Pullen; March 5, 1931; Blountsville, Alabama, United States
- Died: November 24, 1961 (aged 30) Long Beach, California, U.S.
- Genres: Rockabilly, country and western
- Instruments: lead vocals, guitar
- Years active: 1949–1959
- Labels: Delta Records (1956–1957), Carlton Records (1957–1958), Sage Records (1958–1960)

Dwight Pullen, also known as Whitey Pullen (March 5, 1931 – November 24, 1961) was an American country music singer-songwriter and western swing bandleader known for his 1958 single, "Sunglasses After Dark" backed with "Teen Age Bug." Pullen was foundational to bringing rock and roll music to the Alaska Territory during the 1950s, working as a concert promoter, booking agent, variety show broadcaster, club owner, and later working as a road manager for The Blue Caps.

== Biography ==
Dwight Arness Pullen (spelt D'wight on his draft registration) was born on March 5, 1931, in Blountsville, Alabama, into a musical family. Nicknamed "Whitey" for his light blond hair, he spent his adolescence in Pittsburg, California, forming a musical ensemble called The Hillbilly Swingsters in 1949, routinely performing at dance halls in Contra Costa County, California and receiving airplay on local radio station KECC. He was conscripted into the U.S. Air Force in December 1950.

=== Alaskan Territory ===
Stationed between Anchorage and Palmer in the Alaska Territory, he was honorably discharged in December 1954. They had a son, John. By the mid-1950s, Dwight and Margaret were known figures in Alaska's entertainment circuit: they operated The Red Barn dance hall in Anchorage, where the reformed Whitey Pullen's Swingsters were the primary house band and they co-hosted the weekly music variety program, The Whitey Pullen Show. As a concert promoter and booking agent, Pullen arranged and scheduled debut Alaskan performances of multiple contemporary rock and roll, country and western, and rockabilly artists. Performance fliers, local club advertisements, and newspaper logs from this era documented his band under the variations Whitey and his Swingsters, headlining at prominent local venues. His promotional work in the Alaska Territory brought him national industry attention partially stemming from a nationwide interest in and surrounding discussions of the territory, as in "Alaska Rock by The Rebelaires."

In December 1956, the Nashville Banner identified him as a television host from Alaskan station KENI who was visiting Nashville. He hosted The Whitey Pullen Show, a weekly Saturday evening country music and variety program on KTVA Channel 11 in Anchorage. The show was documented repeatedly in local television listings. At the Red Barn, the Hi-Hat, and the Western Club, among other regional venues, Pullen and his Swingsters hosted and backed touring guest stars including Johnny Horton, Curley Collins, and Lefty Frizzell, with their live performances frequently broadcast on radio station KBYR.In September 1958, Pullen accompanied Grand Ole Opry star Little Jimmy Dickens for a personal appearance at the Shamrock Lounge in Palmer, billed alongside Dickens in local advertising.

=== Recording career, televised performing, and managing Gene Vincent's Blue Caps (1956-1960) ===
Pullen released his first single through Delta Records in 1956. His best‑known single featured "Sunglasses After Dark" and "Teen Age Bug" as the A-side and B-side was recorded in 1957 and released on Carlton Records in 1958. Billboard reviewed both sides on March 3, 1958, concluding the music to be "listenable [with potential to] click with the kids [and] start something." On March 20, 1958, Pullen appeared as a guest performer on the ABC television program American Bandstand, hosted by Dick Clark, performing "Don't Make Me Cry (I Love You)" and "Sunglasses After Dark." He also appeared on Los Angeles television's Dance Party Town Hall, episode 25.

Pullen served as the road manager for Gene Vincent and The Blue Caps in late 1959, overseeing logistics during the group's tour of Japan. Blue Caps guitarist Jerry Merritt credited Pullen with co‑writing the Vincent recordings "She She Little Sheila" and "Everybody's Got a Date But Me." Pullen's subsequent commercial releases were issued by Sage & Sand record label.

=== Death ===
Pullen died of prostate cancer in Long Beach, California, on November 24, 1961, at age 30. A 1962 obituary published in Billboard Music Weekly is the most comprehensive:

Funeral services for Dwight (Whitey) Pullen, well-known country and western singer, who, with his band, entertained in Palmer and Anchorage, Alaska, for nearly five years, were held recently in Long Beach, Calif.

Pullen died of cancer November 24 after a long illness. The remains were shipped to Bessemer, Ala for burial. Pullen was well known in Alaska as a Western singer and guitar player and was instrumental in bringing a number of Western stars to Alaska for personal appearances. At one time, he owned and' operated the [Country and] Western Club in Anchorage. Surviving are his widow, Margaret Ann; a son, Johnny D., 8; and his parents.

=== Legacy and influence ===
"Sunglasses After Dark" achieved enduring cult status within European rockabilly revivalist and psychobilly subcultures. The track was partially covered by The Cramps in 1978; their reimagining borrowed structural lyrics from Pullen's original track while blending the instrumentation with Link Wray's "Ace of Spades."
