= The Waltz of the Wind =

Single by Hank Williams
- B-side: "No One Will Ever Know"
- Released: 1957
- Recorded: 1949 (Unconfirmed)
- Genre: Country, Gospel
- Length: 2:09
- Label: MGM
- Songwriter(s): Fred Rose

"The Waltz of the Wind" is a song written by Fred Rose. Hank Williams recorded it as a demo in 1948 or 1949 in Shreveport alone with his guitar and it was released as a posthumous single by MGM Records in 1957. Gene Vincent recorded a rockabilly version for his 1956 album Bluejean Bop!.
