= Gene Vincent and the Blue Caps =

Album by Gene Vincent

Studio album by Gene Vincent
- Released: March 4, 1957
- Recorded: October 1956
- Genre: Rock and roll
- Length: 28:07; 39:43 (reissue)
- Label: Capitol
- Producer: Ken Nelson

Gene Vincent chronology
Bluejean Bop! (1956)	Gene Vincent and the Blue Caps (1957)	Gene Vincent Rocks! And the Blue Caps Roll! (1958)

Professional ratings
Review scores
Source	Rating
AllMusic	5/5 stars

Gene Vincent and the Blue Caps is an album by Gene Vincent and His Blue Caps. It was originally released in 1957, four months after its predecessor, Bluejean Bop!. It was released on the Capitol label. It was re-released on CD in 2002. Cliff Gallup and rhythm guitarist Willie Williams had left the Blue Caps in the fall of 1956. Gallup was persuaded by producer, Ken Nelson, to temporarily rejoin for the sessions that resulted in the album.

== Track listing ==
=== Side 1 ===
1. "Red Blue Jeans and a Pony Tail" (Jack Rhodes, Bill "Tex" Davis) – 2:14
2. "Hold Me, Hug Me, Rock Me" (Gene Vincent, Davis) – 2:15
3. "Unchained Melody" (Alex North, Hy Zaret) – 2:37
4. "You Told a Fib" (Vincent, Cliff Gallup) – 2:21
5. "Cat Man" (Vincent, Davis) – 2:18
6. "You Better Believe" (Gallup) – 2:01

=== Side 2 ===
7. "Cruisin'" (Vincent, Davis) – 2:12
8. "Double Talkin' Baby" (Danny Wolfe) – 2:12
9. "Blues Stay Away from Me" (Henry Glover, Wayne Raney, Alton Delmore, Rabon Delmore) – 2:16
10. "Pink Thunderbird" (Paul Peek, Davis) – 2:32
11. "I Sure Miss You" (Charles Matthews) – 2:38
12. "Pretty, Pretty Baby" (Wolfe) – 2:27

=== 2002 CD reissue bonus tracks ===
13. "Important Words" [version one] (Vincent, Davis) – 2:21
14. "B-I-Bickey-Bi, Bo-Bo-Go" (Don Carter, Dub Nalls, Jack Rhodes) – 2:16
15. "Five Days, Five Days" (Rhodes, Willey, Franks) – 2:37
16. "Teenager Partner" [version one] (Vincent, Davis) – 2:14
17. "Five Feet of Lovin'" [version one] (Buck Peddy, Melvin Tillis) – 2:06

== Personnel ==
- Gene Vincent – guitar, vocals

=== The Blue Caps ===
- Cliff Gallup – lead guitar
- Paul Peek – rhythm guitar
- Willie Williams – rhythm guitar (tracks 4, 11)
- Russell Williford – acoustic guitar
- Jack Neal – upright bass
- Dickie Harrell – drums
- Clifton Simmons – piano
- The Jordanaires – backing vocals on "You Better Believe", "Important Words" (version one) and "Five Days, Five Days"
