= A Soldier Speaks =

Song
- Published: 1944
- Songwriter: Peter DeRose

"A Soldier Speaks" is a song from 1944, with music and lyrics by Peter DeRose, and published by Robbins Music Corp.
