= High School USA (disambiguation) =

High School U.S.A. is a 1983 NBC television movie starring Michael J. Fox, Anthony Edwards, Crispin Glover, Nancy McKeon and Todd Bridges.

High School USA may also refer to:

- "High School U.S.A." (song), a 1959 song by Tommy Facenda
- High School USA!, a 2013 animated television series created by Dino Stamatopoulos

== See also ==
- High school (United States)
