= João Barreiros =

Portuguese science fiction writer, editor, translator and critic

João Manuel Rosado Barreiros (born July 31, 1952), also known by the pseudonym José de Barros, is a Portuguese science fiction writer, editor, translator and critic.

He graduated in Philosophy from the University of Lisbon in 1977, and has been teaching it in high school since 1975. His experiences in education eventually led him to write a semi-autobiographical satire titled "The Test" in 2000.

== Fiction ==
Barreiros's writing style, influenced by that of Robert Silverberg and James Tiptree, Jr, is distinctively sardonic and shows a marked tendency towards satire and black comedy.

His plots frequently employ unlikeable protagonists in dystopic settings, where they are faced with the brutality of everyday life and are often thwarted by their own actions in the end. The stories tend to offer extremely graphic depictions of violence, and utterly reject political correctness and its icons — Walt Disney and Sesame Street are frequent targets of derision by Barreiros, for example, and he has gone so far as to cast Big Bird analogues as the principal antagonists in A verdadeira invasão dos marcianos.

Some of Barreiros's work has been translated into English, Spanish, French, Italian and Serbian.

He has twice won the Brazilian Nova Award, offered by fans to the best foreign short story published in South America, for "Um Dia com Júlia na Necrosfera" (in 1992) and "A Arder Caíram os Anjos" (in 1994). He was won the Adamastor Prize for Short Stories in 2014 with "O Coração é um Predador Solitário".

== Miscellaneous activity ==
João Barreiros's book and film reviews have appeared in publications such as Público, O Independente, Ler and Os Meus Livros. The mercilessness of Barreiros's criticism earned him a reputation among Portuguese science fiction fans, and his titanium nib fountain pen gained legendary status as a result.

During the 1980s and early 1990s, Barreiros edited two science fiction and fantasy labels for Editora Clássica and Gradiva. Among the writers he introduced to a Portuguese audience are Iain M. Banks, William Gibson, Peter Straub, Dan Simmons and A. A. Attanasio. Publishers usually balked at Barreiros's unorthodox picks, and so books like Stephen R. Donaldson's Lord Foul's Bane, Nancy A. Collins's Sunglasses After Dark and James Blaylock's The Last Coin were translated but never published.

Barreiros also co-founded Simetria — Portuguese Science Fiction and Fantasy Association in 1995 (he later broke from it, in 1999), and the Portuguese Association for the Fantastic in the Arts in 2005.

== Bibliography ==
- Duas fábulas tecnocráticas (collection, 1977)
- O caçador de brinquedos e outras histórias (collection, 1994)
- Terrarium: Um romance em mosaicos (with Luís Filipe Silva, 1996)
- Disney no céu entre os Dumbos (2001 [online], 2006 [print])
- A verdadeira invasão dos marcianos (2004)
- A sombra sobre Lisboa (contributor, 2006)
- A bondade dos estranhos: Projecto Candyman (2007)
- Se acordar antes de morrer (collection, 2010)
- Lisboa no ano 2000 (editor and contributor, 2013)
- Crazy Equóides (2018)
