= USS Chukawan =

Oiler of the United States Navy

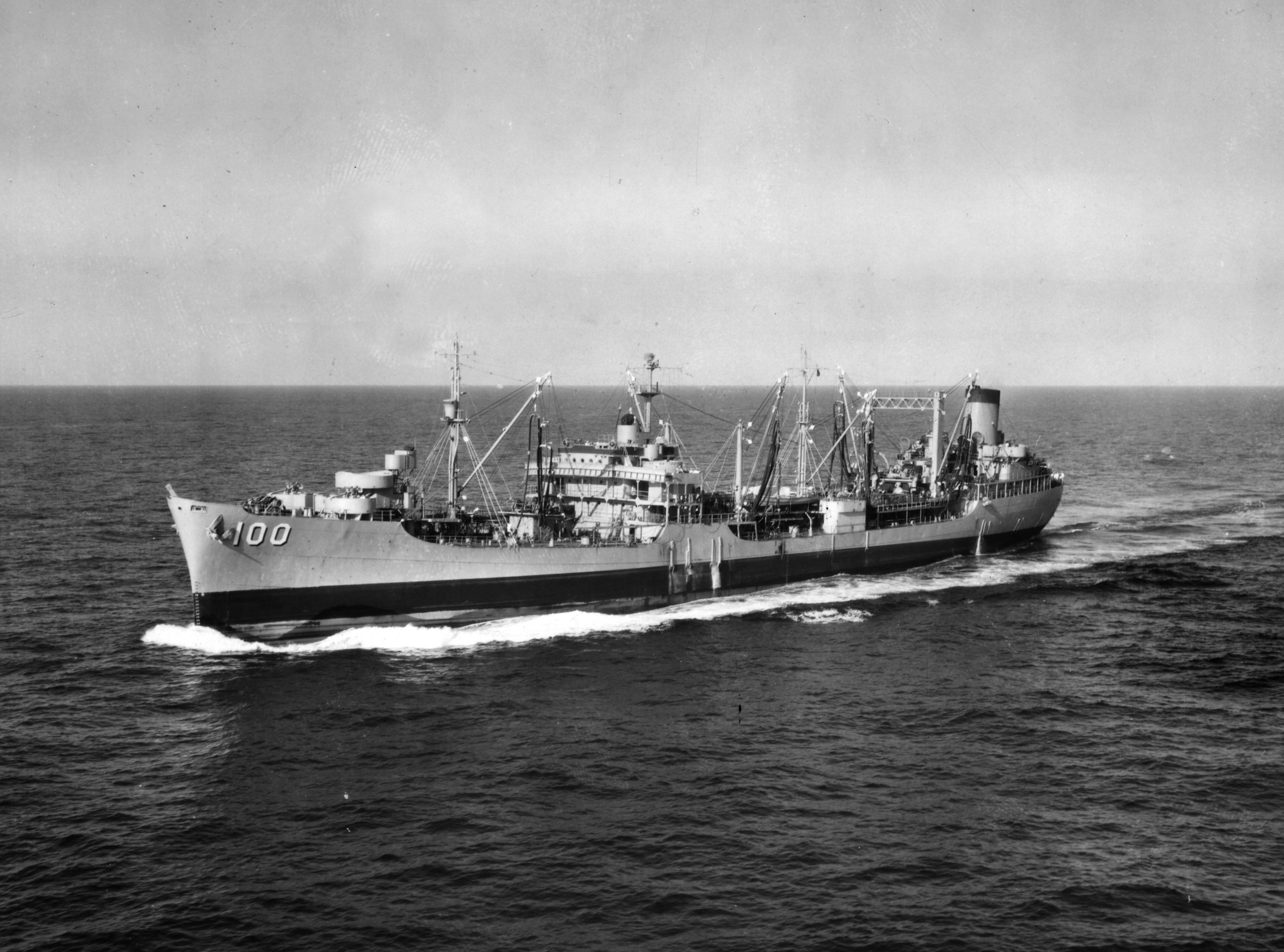
- USS Chukawan (AO-100) underway, 1958

History

United States
- Name: USS Chukawan
- Namesake: Chukawan River in Alaska
- Ordered: as T3-S2-A3 tanker hull
- Laid down: date unknown
- Launched: 28 August 1945
- Commissioned: 22 January 1946
- Decommissioned: 13 June 1972
- Stricken: 1 July 1972
- Fate: Sold for scrapping, 1 March 1973

General characteristics
- Class & type: Cimarron-class fleet oiler
- Displacement: 7,236 t.(lt) 25,440 t.(fl)
- Length: 553 ft (169 m)
- Beam: 75 ft (23 m)
- Draft: 32 ft (9.8 m)
- Propulsion: geared turbines, twin screws, 30,400 hp (22,700 kW)
- Speed: 18 knots (33 km/h)
- Capacity: 146,000 barrels (23,200 m^{3})
- Complement: 314
- Armament: one single 5 in (130 mm)/38 dual-purpose gun mount; four single 3 in (76 mm)/50 dual-purpose gun mounts; four twin 40 mm AA gun mounts; four twin 20 mm AA gun mounts

USS Chukawan (AO-100) was a Cimarron-class fleet oiler constructed for the U.S. Navy in the closing days of World War II.

== Career ==
Chukawan (AO-100) was launched 28 August 1945 by Bethlehem Steel Co., Sparrows Point, Maryland; sponsored by Miss M. McCrea; commissioned 22 January 1946 and reported to the Atlantic Fleet.

From the time of her commissioning through 1963, Chukawan helped give the U.S. Fleet its unique mobility. From her home port at Norfolk, Virginia, she repeatedly sailed to fuel ships operating in exercises along the coast, to transport oil products overseas and to carry oil from producing regions. Among her most important duties were her cruises with the U.S. 6th Fleet in the Mediterranean Sea. These deployments occurred in 1947, 1950, 1951–52, 1954, 1955–56, 1957, 1958, and 1960, and were occasions for visits to a variety of Mediterranean ports, as well as participation in various operations.

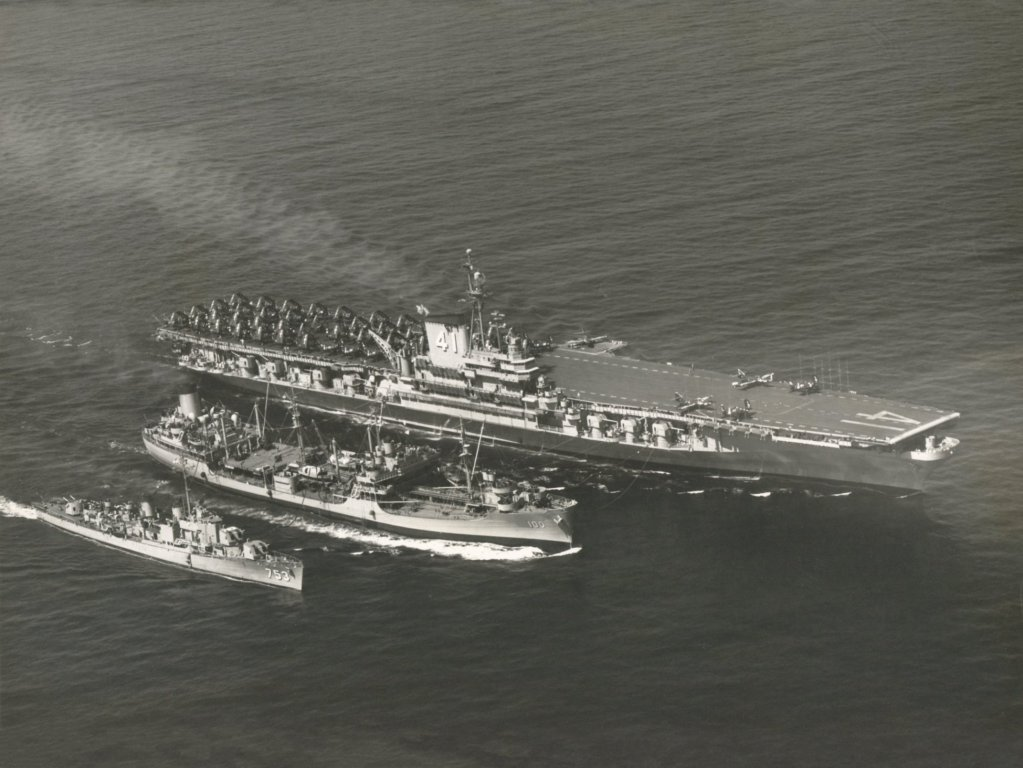
Chukawan refueling USS Midway and USS John R. Pierce in 1950.

Two of these were of special international significance. The first came in November 1956, upon the outbreak of the Suez Crisis, when she sailed from Norfolk on short notice with a carrier task force assigned to stand by in the eastern Atlantic should American strength in the Mediterranean need enhancement. Her second dramatic incident occurred through her service to 6th Fleet ships during the 1958 Lebanon crisis, when such support as hers made possible the landing of U.S. Marines on the shortest possible notice.

Chukawan was decommissioned, 13 June 1972, at Pier 2, Naval Station, Norfolk, Virginia, and she was subsequently struck from the Naval Register, 1 July 1972. She was sold for scrapping by the Defense Reutilization and Marketing Service, 1 March 1973.

In 1952, Rockabilly musician, Gene Vincent, served on her, later serving a two-week training period on USS Amphion (AR-13).

== Military honors and awards ==
Chukawan's crew members were authorized the following medals:

- Navy Meritorious Unit Commendation (3)
- American Campaign Medal
- World War II Victory Medal
- National Defense Service Medal (2)
- Armed Forces Expeditionary Medal (1-Lebanon)
