= Wagon Wheels (song) =

1930's song by Billy Hill and Peter DeRose

- by Billy Hill and Peter DeRose
- Genre: Western song
- Composed: 1930s

"Wagon Wheels" is a Western song written by Billy Hill and Peter DeRose in the early 1930s. Members of the Western Writers of America chose it as one of the Top 100 Western songs of all time.

== Background ==
The song was used as the title song in the 1934 western movie Wagon Wheels, starring Randolph Scott and Gail Patrick. It was sung by Everett Marshall in the Ziegfeld Follies of 1934.

"Wagon Wheels" has been recorded dozens of times over the years, by artists including Paul Whiteman and His Orchestra and Paul Robeson in 1934, and Sammy Davis Jr., The Platters, Sonny Rollins and Johnnie Ray later on.
