= No One Will Ever Know =

Single by Hank Williams
- A-side: "The Waltz of the Wind"
- Released: 1957
- Recorded: 1948 or 1949, Shreveport
- Genre: Country
- Length: 2:18
- Label: MGM
- Songwriters: Fred Rose, Mel Forre

"No One Will Ever Know" is a song written by Fred Rose and Mel Forre. It was originally associated with country icon Hank Williams when it was issued as a posthumous single in 1957.

== Background ==
Rose originally recorded the song with his String Band in 1945 for Columbia Records. Roy Acuff and The Smoky Mountain Boys were the first to release this song in August 1945. Williams recorded his version alone with his guitar while working in Shreveport in 1948 or 1949. By 1957, MGM Records was still releasing singles on the late country singer, including demos, radio performances, and tracks featuring overdubbed instruments, and while some became hits, though several, such as his duets with Audrey Williams, were of dubious quality.

== Cover versions ==
- Tony Bennett, who scored a pop smash with Williams' "Cold, Cold Heart," released a version on Columbia in 1952.
- The Wilburn Brothers cut the song in 1958 for Decca.
- Marty Robbins released a version on Columbia Records in 1962.
- Don Gibson covered the song for RCA.
- Al Martino released a pop version.
- Carl Smith recorded it for Columbia.
- Roy Orbison recorded the song for Monument in 1963.
- Stonewall Jackson released it on Columbia in 1963.
- David Box recorded two versions in 1963 and 1964 for JOED Records as the B-side to his single "Little Lonely Summer Girl".
- Dottie West recorded it for RCA.
- Loretta Lynn cut it for Decca.
- Hank Locklin recorded a version of the song.
- Hank Snow covered it for RCA.
- Ferlin Husky recorded the song for Capitol.
- Columbia Records released a version by Johnny Cash.
- Hank Williams' hero Roy Acuff cut the song in 1968.
- Ronnie Milsap released the song on RCA.
- Jerry Lee Lewis recorded a version on Mercury Records in 1976.
- Gene Watson covered the song for Capitol.
- David Allan Coe included it on his 1997 LP The Ghost of Hank Williams.
- Jack Scott recorded it in 1958.
- Kitty Kallen MGM Records, 1965.
