= Wedding Bells Are Breaking Up That Old Gang of Mine =

"Wedding Bells (Are Breaking Up That Old Gang of Mine)"
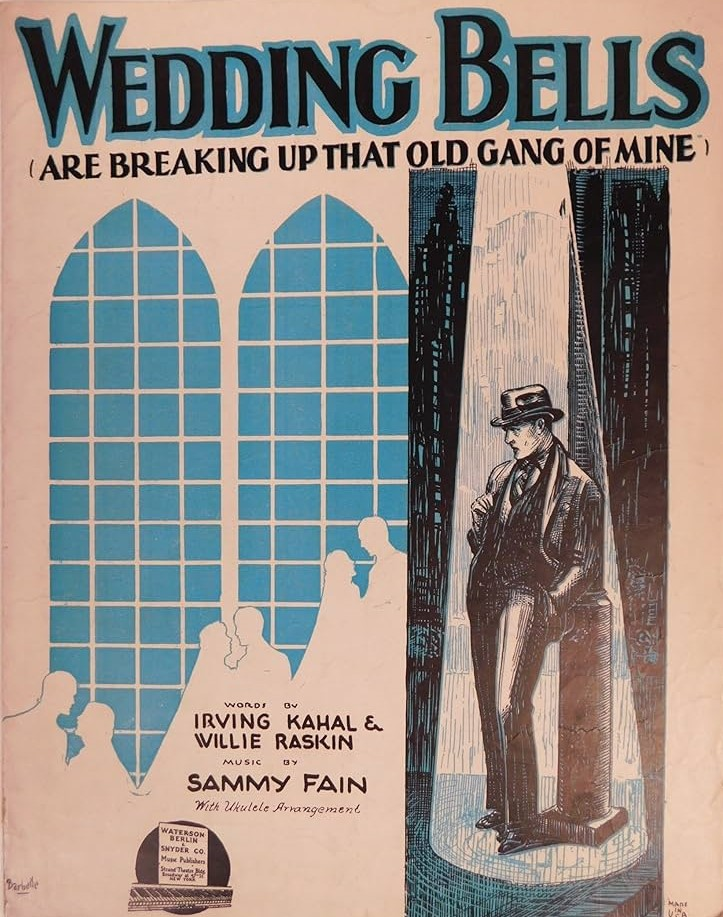
- Sheet music cover, 1929

Song
- Published: 1929
- Composer: Sammy Fain
- Lyricists: Irving Kahal; Willie Raskin

"Wedding Bells (Are Breaking Up That Old Gang Of Mine)" is a popular barbershop song composed by Sammy Fain with lyrics by Irving Kahal and Willie Raskin. Published in 1929, the song laments the loss of childhood friendships as they are replaced by adult relationships.

This song was recorded by Gene Austin on February 23, 1929 (Victor 21893), peaking on the US charts at #8. It was covered by Steve Gibson in 1948 and by The Four Aces in 1954. It is one of the tracks on Gene Vincent's 1956 debut album Bluejean Bop (Capitol T764).

The Beatles, for whom Gene Vincent was an influence, were fans of the song. On separate occasions while being interviewed, both John Lennon and Paul McCartney referred to the song as a commentary on the way the group had grown apart during the years before their break-up — Lennon in his Lennon Remembers interview for Rolling Stone in 1971, and McCartney in the final episode of The Beatles Anthology in 1995. George Harrison performed a cover of the song during a jam session while recording his 1970 album All Things Must Pass; the recording was eventually released as part of the 50th anniversary reissue of the album in 2021.
