= Billy Hill (songwriter) =

American songwriter and lyricist

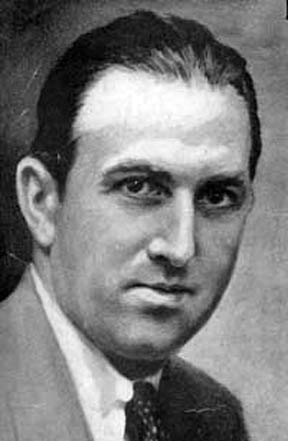
- Billy Hill, c. 1933

Background information
- Born: William Joseph Hill; July 14, 1899; Boston, Massachusetts
- Died: December 24, 1940 (aged 41) Boston, Massachusetts
- Genres: Western music, country music, jazz
- Occupations: songwriter musician

William Joseph Hill (July 14, 1899 – December 24, 1940) was an American songwriter, violinist, and pianist who found fame writing Western songs such as "They Cut Down the Old Pine Tree", "The Last Round-Up", "Wagon Wheels", and "Empty Saddles". Hill's most popular song was "The Glory of Love", recorded by Benny Goodman in 1936 and by Peggy Lee, Otis Redding, Paul McCartney, and others.

== Early years ==
William Joseph Hill was born on July 14, 1899, in the Jamaica Plain neighborhood of Boston, Massachusetts. He studied the violin at the New England Conservatory of Music under Karl Muck, and played with the Boston Symphony Orchestra. Hill left home at age 17 and headed west, where he worked as a cowboy in Montana and as a surveyor and prospector in Death Valley, California. He returned to music and played violin and piano in dance halls until forming his own jazz band in Salt Lake City, Utah.

== Songwriting career ==
In 1930, Hill moved to New York City seeking success as a songwriter while working another series of odd jobs. In 1933, he wrote "The Last Roundup", his first hit song, which was introduced by Joe Morrison at the Paramount Theater and eventually made the 1933 Hit Parade. The song's success made Billy Hill one of the more successful songwriters on Tin Pan Alley.

Hill collaborated with many songwriters, including Peter DeRose, Dedette Hill (his wife), Victor Young, William Raskin, Edward Eliscu, and J. Keirn Brennan, producing standards such as "They Cut Down the Old Pine Tree", "Have You Ever Been Lonely?", "Wagon Wheels", "Empty Saddles", "In the Chapel in the Moonlight", "The Call of the Canyon", "On a Little Street in Singapore", "The Old Man of the Mountain", "The Old Spinning Wheel", "There's a Cabin in the Pines", "Put on an Old Pair of Shoes", "Lights Out", and "The Glory of Love".

Under the name of George "Funky" Brown, he co-wrote the song "Have You Ever Been Lonely?" as well as "That's When Your Heartaches Begin", which was made popular by both The Ink Spots and Elvis Presley.

Billy Hill died of heart failure in a Boston hotel room on Christmas Eve, December 24, 1940. He was 41.

== Honors and awards ==
- Songwriters Hall of Fame
- Nashville Songwriters Hall of Fame

== Songs ==
- "All Ashore"
- "Alone at the Table for Two"
- "Angeline"
- "Arizona Moon"
- "Brills of Normandy"
- "Buggy Song"
- "The Call of the Canyon"
- "Candlelights and Roses"
- "The Clouds Will Soon Roll By"
- "Colorado Memories"
- "Colorado Moon"
- "Dream River"
- "Empty Saddles (in the Old Corral)"
- "Everything Has Changed by You"
- "Face in the Fireplace"
- "Forbidden Love"
- "Have You Ever Been Lonely?"
- "Hook and Ladder 31"
- "Hot Tamales"
- "I Wonder Where My Old Girl"
- "I'm Going to Yodel My Way"
- "If I Had Somebody to Love"
- "In a Little Town Across the Border"
- "In the Mission by the Sea"
- "In the Chapel in the Moonlight"
- "In the Dark"
- "Just Say Aloha"
- "Ladies of the Night"
- "Lights Out"
- "Little Black Shawl"
- "Little Old Buryin' Ground"
- "Locked Up in Prison"
- "Lost"
- "Louisville Lady"
- "Maker of Dreams"
- "Manyana Tomorrow"
- "May I Have This Waltz You"
- "Meet Me Tonight in the Old Bunkhouse"
- "Moon Over Monterey"
- "Night After Night"
- "Night on the Desert"
- "Nobody Sings Me a Love Song"
- "Oh Muki Muki Oh"
- "The Old Man of the Mountain"
- "On a Little Dream Ranch"
- "On a Little Street in Singapore"
- "Oregon Trail"
- "Playmates"
- "Prairie Lullaby"
- "Put on an Old Pair of Shoes"
- "Rain"
- "Rock a Bye Baby Blues"
- "Rock Me to Sleep"
- "Rollin' Home"
- "Sleepy Head"
- "Smoke from a Chimney"
- "So Little Time"
- "Something to Remember"
- "Street in Havana"
- "Sweet Misery of Love"
- "Sweethearts in Paradise"
- "Take Those Mountains Out"
- "That's What I Call Heaven"
- "That's When Your Heartaches Begin"
- "That's Where the South Belongs"
- "The Glory of Love"
- "The Last Round-Up"
- "The Mountaineers Sweetheart"
- "The Old Covered Bridge"
- "The Old Spinning Wheel"
- "The Scene Changes"
- "The West, A Nest and You"
- "There's a Cabin in the Pines"
- "There's a Home in Wyoming"
- "There's Little Box of Pine O"
- "There's No Light in the Lighthouse"
- "There's a Wild Rose that Grows"
- "They Cut Down the Old Pine"
- "Till the Clock Strikes Three"
- "Timber"
- "The Tree that Father Planted"
- "Wagon Wheels"
- "Was I a Rooster"
- "West, a Nest, and You"
- "When I Was a Boy"
- "When Twilight Comes"
- "When Your Love Knocks at Your Heart"
- "Why Am I Blue"
- "You Should Have Told Me"
- "You'll Grow Sweeter Sweetheart"
