= Bluejean Bop! =

Studio album by Gene Vincent
- Released: 13 August 1956
- Recorded: June 1956
- Genre: Rock and roll
- Length: 31:47
- Label: Capitol
- Producer: Ken Nelson

Gene Vincent chronology
Bluejean Bop! (1956)	Gene Vincent and His Blue Caps (1957)

Singles from Bluejean Bop!
- 1. "Bluejean Bop" Released: 12 October 1956; 2. "Jumps, Giggles And Shouts" Released: January 1957 in U.K. only.

Professional ratings
Review scores
Source	Rating
AllMusic	5/5 stars

Bluejean Bop! is the debut studio album by American rockabilly singer and his backing band Gene Vincent and His Blue Caps, featuring rock and roll music as well as covers of pop standards. It was released in 1956 on the Capitol label. Bluejean Bop! was followed by Gene Vincent and the Blue Caps.

== Track listing ==
1. "Bluejean Bop" (Hal Levy, Gene Vincent) – 2:35
2. "Jezebel" (Wayne Shanklin) – 2:38
3. "Who Slapped John?" (Tex Davis, Vincent) – 2:07
4. "Ain't She Sweet" (Milton Ager, Jack Yellen) – 2:44
5. "I Flipped" (Richard Penniman, Chilton Price) – 2:38
6. "Waltz of the Wind" (Fred Rose) – 2:59
7. "Jump Back, Honey, Jump Back" (Hadda Brooks) – 2:11
8. "Wedding Bells (Are Breaking Up That Old Gang of Mine)" (Sammy Fain, Irving Kahal, Willie Raskin) – 2:45
9. "Jumps, Giggles and Shouts" (Davis, Vincent) – 3:06
10. "Up a Lazy River" (Sidney Arodin, Hoagy Carmichael) – 2:35
11. "Bop Street" (Tex Davis, Cliff Gallup) – 2:38
12. "Peg O' My Heart" (Alfred Bryan, Fred Fisher) – 2:27

== Personnel ==
- Gene Vincent – guitar, vocals

=== The Blue Caps ===
- "Galloping" Cliff Gallup – lead guitar
- "Wee" Willie Williams – rhythm guitar
- "Jumpin'" Jack Neal – upright bass
- "Be-Bop" Dickie Harrell – drums
