= Be-Bop-a-Lula =

Single by Gene Vincent and His Blue Caps
- B-side: "Woman Love"
- Released: May 22, 1956
- Recorded: Bradley Studios, Nashville, Tennessee
- Genre: Rockabilly
- Length: 2:37
- Label: Capitol
- Songwriters: Gene Vincent, Donald Graves, Bill "Sheriff Tex" Davis

Gene Vincent and His Blue Caps singles chronology
"Be-Bop-a-Lula" (1956)	"Race with the Devil" (1956)

Official audio
- "Be-Bop-a-Lula" on YouTube

"Be-Bop-a-Lula" is a rockabilly song first recorded in 1956 by Gene Vincent and His Blue Caps.

== Composition ==
Richie Unterberger of AllMusic said the track "epitomized rockabilly at its prime in 1956 with its sharp guitar breaks, spare snare drums, fluttering echo, and Vincent's breathless, sexy vocals".

The phrase "Be-Bop-a-Lula" is similar to "Be-Baba-Leba", the title of a No. 3 R&B chart hit for Helen Humes in 1945, which became a bigger hit when recorded by Lionel Hampton as "Hey! Ba-Ba-Re-Bop". This phrase, or something very similar, was widely used in jazz circles in the 1940s, giving its name to the bebop style, and possibly being ultimately derived from the shout of "Arriba! Arriba!" used by Latin American bandleaders to encourage band members.

== Background ==
The writing of the song is credited to Gene Vincent and his manager, Bill "Sheriff Tex" Davis. Evidently the song originated in 1955, when Vincent was recuperating from a motorcycle accident at the US Naval Hospital in Portsmouth, Virginia. There, he met Donald Graves, who supposedly wrote the words to the song while Vincent wrote the tune. The song came to the attention of Davis, who allegedly bought out Graves' rights to the song for some $50 (sources vary as to the exact amount), and had himself credited as the lyric writer. Davis claimed that he wrote the song with Gene Vincent after listening to the song "Don't Bring Lulu". Vincent himself sometimes claimed that he wrote the words inspired by the comic strip, "Little Lulu": "I come in dead drunk and stumble over the bed. And me and Don Graves were looking at this bloody book; it was called Little Lulu. And I said, "Hell, man, it's 'Be-Bop-a-Lulu.' And he said, 'Yeah, man, swinging.' And we wrote this song."

== Recording by Gene Vincent ==
In early 1956, Gene Vincent performed the song on a radio show in Norfolk, Virginia, and recorded a demo version which was passed to Capitol Records, who were looking for a young singer to rival Elvis Presley. Capitol invited Vincent to record the song and it was recorded at the Bradley Studios in Nashville, Tennessee on May 4, 1956. Cliff Gallup (lead guitar), "Wee" Willie Williams (rhythm guitar), "Jumpin'" Jack Neal (string bass), and Dickie "Be Bop" Harrell (drums) comprised the band. When the song was being recorded, Harrell screamed twice in the background, he said because he wanted to be sure his mother could hear it was him on the record.

Now this is the first record I ever bought when I was a kid, and I saved up my pocket money for months, and then I took the bus down-town to the record shop, and I remember going into the back of the shop and listening to the record and loving it. It was just very early days of rock'n'roll, so it was just such a thrill, and then I got back on the bus, went home and played it endlessly, and these memories, of Gene Vincent and the Blue Caps singing "Be-Bop-A-Lula" will stay with me forever.
– Paul McCartney, 2020

The song was released in June 1956 on Capitol Records' single F3450, and immediately sold well. The song was successful on three American singles charts: it peaked at No. 7 on the US Billboard pop music chart, No. 8 on the R&B chart, and also made the top ten on the C&W Best Seller chart peaking at No. 5. In the UK, it peaked at No. 16 in August 1956. In April 1957, the record company announced that over 2 million copies had been sold to date.

The original demo for the song, probably recorded at radio station WCMS, has never been located and is presumed lost. The song drew comparisons to Presley and is listed as No. 103 on Rolling Stone's 500 Greatest Songs of All Time.

Steve Allen mocked the lyrics to the song by reading them in a pseudo-serious tone accompanied by light piano background music in a September 1957 broadcast of The Steve Allen Show.

Vincent recorded a new version of the song in 1963 which appeared on the flip-side of the single "The King of Fools".

Vincent is featured singing the song in the movie The Girl Can't Help It which was released in December 1956.

In 1999, the 1956 recording of the song on Capitol Records was inducted into the Grammy Hall of Fame.

== Cover versions ==
"Be-Bop-a-Lula" has been covered by numerous and varied artists. The Everly Brothers released a version only two years after Vincent's, on their 1958 self-titled debut album, and they included it as part of the setlist at their Royal Albert Hall reunion concert in 1983. English rock band the Drifters covered the song for Cliff Richard and the group's own debut album, Cliff, in 1959. Vincent's rockabilly colleague Jerry Lee Lewis recorded it for the 1971 album Monsters, and Carl Perkins offered his own take in 1996 on the album The Man & The Legend.

The Beatles played the song regularly during their early years, and a raucous live version (complete with guest vocals by Fred Fascher) can be heard on Live! at the Star-Club in Hamburg, Germany; 1962. John Lennon later recorded the song for his 1975 album Rock 'n' Roll, and it was used as the B-side for the Apple single release of "Ya Ya" in Germany later that year. Paul McCartney performed an acoustic version on the 1991 live album Unplugged (The Official Bootleg). At the 1972 Sunbury Rock Festival in Victoria Australia, Billy Thorpe and the Aztecs recorded a driving rock cover of the song.

== In popular culture ==
Vincent's original version of the song is featured in the soundtracks of several films including The Girl Can't Help It (1956), in which Vincent and several other early rock 'n' roll stars appeared in cameo performances, as well as The Delinquents (1989), Wild At Heart (1990), and Pleasantville (1998).

In the late 1960s and early 1970s, George Harrison played a psychedelic Stratocaster called "Rocky", which bore on its face the one-word slogan "Bebopalula". The song is name-checked in the opening of Dire Straits' 1985 hit "Walk of Life" as one of the great "oldies, goldies".

Italian DJ and TV personality Red Ronnie (a.k.a. Gabriele Anzaloni) named his first and long-running TV show after the song, also using Vincent's performance in the film The Girl Can't Help It as the signature tune of the show (accompanied by cartoonist Bonvi's Sturmtruppen-inspired animations).

The song features in the soundtrack of Jack Smith's avant-garde film, Flaming Creatures (1963).

A cover version of the song by Chris Cawte appears in the animated film Planet 51.

John Lennon, a great admirer of the song, mentioned it in the final interview he recorded on December 8, 1980, noting, "If the oldies but goldies come on (the radio), it's one of my favorites, if I hear 'Be-Bop-a-Lula', I can hear it over and over again. Every time it comes on I switch up the thing, and I have the record still."

Spinvis, a Dutch one-man music project, released his seventh album Be-Bop-a-Lula on April 7, 2023, named after this song. The album-opening song "Tingeltangel Hersenpan" also mentions "Be-Bop-a-Lula" in the pre-chorus

Burton Cummings uses the title in the line "Be-Bop-A-Lula, babe", in his 1977 single "My Own Way To Rock".
