= Luís Filipe Silva =

Portuguese writer

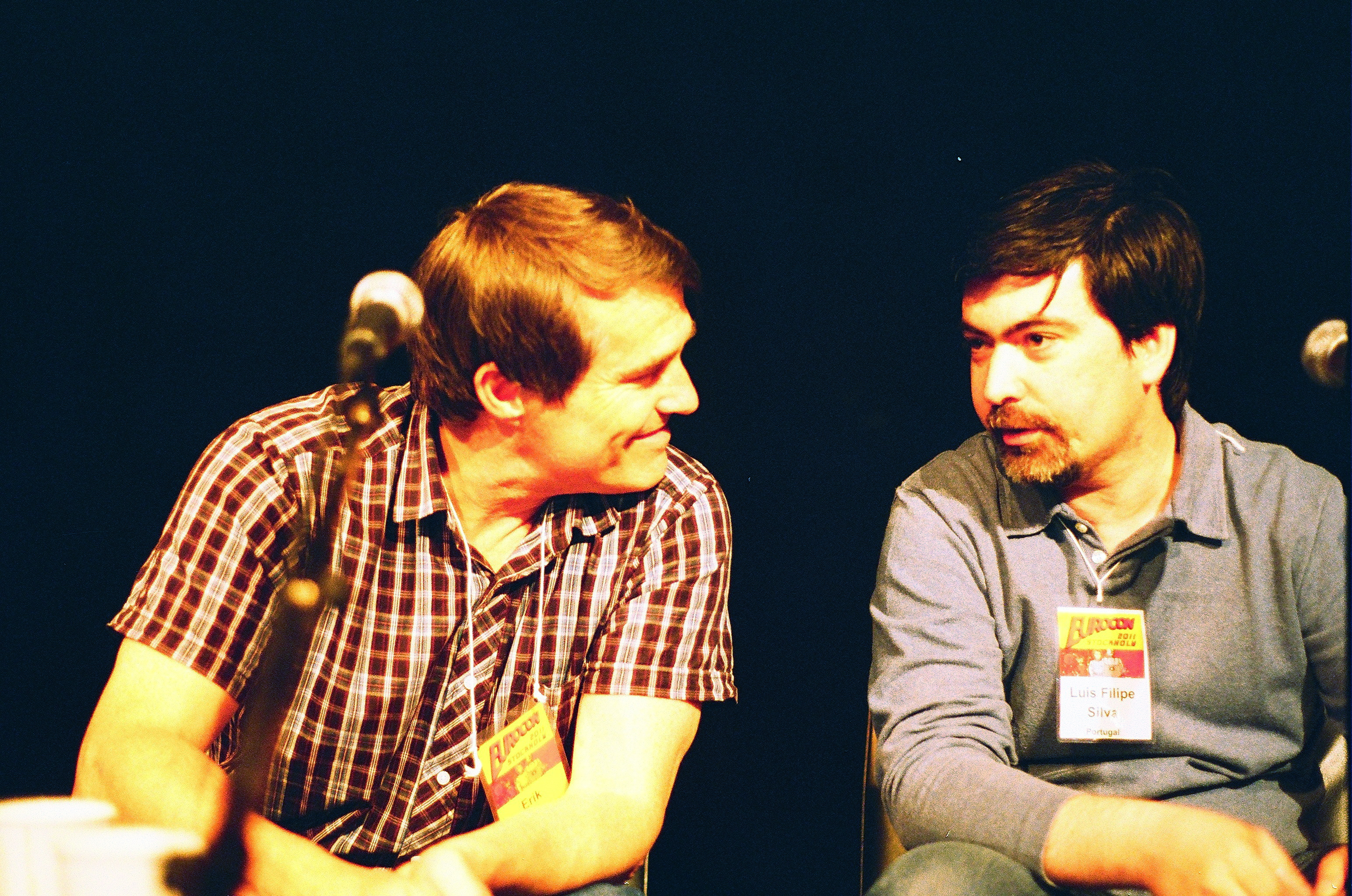
Luís Filipe Silva (right) with Swedish fantasy writer Erik Granström at Eurocon 2011 in Stockholm.

Luís Filipe Silva (born 6 December 1969) is a Portuguese writer of science fiction. He has won the Editorial Caminho de Ficção Científica Prize in 1991 with the book O Futuro à Janela.

== Bibliography ==
=== As an author ===
- O Futuro à Janela, short-story collection (1991)
- GalxMente I: Cidade da Carne, novel (1993)
- GalxMente II: Vinganças, novel (1993)
- Terrarium: Um romance em mosaicos (with João Barreiros, 1996)
- Aqueles Que Repousam na Eternidade, novella (2006)

=== As an editor ===
- Por Universos Nunca Dantes Navegados (2007), co-edited with Jorge Candeias
- Vaporpunk (2010), co-edited with Gerson Lodi-Ribeiro
- Os Anos de Ouro da Pulp Fiction Portuguesa (2011), co-edited with Luís Corte-Real
- O Resto é Paisagem (2018), co-edited with Pedro Cipriano

=== As a translator ===
- Rainha dos Anjos (Queen of Angels), Greg Bear
- Crónicas da Espada 1 - O Encontro (Swords and Deviltry), Fritz Leiber
- O Verdadeiro Dr. Fausto (Jack Faust), Michael Swanwick
