= USS Amphion =

USS Amphion may refer to:

- USS Amphion (1899), launched in 1899 as a German passenger liner (Köln) and served as a transport during World War I. She was sold for scrap in 1924.
- USS Amphion (AR-13), was commissioned in 1946, she decommissioned in 1971 and was sold to Iran as Chah Bahar.
