= That's When Your Heartaches Begin =

1957 song

"That's When Your Heartaches Begin" is a 1937 song by Fred Fisher, William Raskin, and Billy Hill. It was first recorded and released the same year by Shep Fields Rippling Rhythm. The song first became popular following a 1941 cover version by the Ink Spots. The song was recorded by Elvis Presley on at least three occasions during the 1950s, and was one of two songs he recorded on acetate in July 1953, prior to the beginning of his professional career.

== Composition ==
This song uses the I-iii-IV-iv chord progression.

== Elvis Presley versions ==
"That's When Your Heartaches Begin"

Single by Elvis Presley
- Released: March 1957
- Recorded: July 18, 1953, Sun Studio, Memphis, Tennessee (acetate); January 13, 1957, Radio Recorders, Hollywood, California
- Length: 2:52 (1953 acetate); 3:28 (1957 single)
- Label: RCA Victor
- Songwriters: Fred Fisher; William Raskin; Billy Hill

Elvis Presley singles chronology
"Too Much" (1957)	"That's When Your Heartaches Begin" (1957)	"(Let Me Be Your) Teddy Bear" (1957)

On July 18, 1953, Elvis Presley paid $3.98 (equivalent to $47.89 in 2025) for studio time at the Sun Studio in Memphis, Tennessee, a recording studio that was also home to the Sun Records label starting in 1952. Presley recorded a double-sided acetate demo single, though he was not yet signed to the Sun Records label. On the A-side, he recorded "My Happiness", later made famous by Connie Francis in 1958. For the B-side, he recorded "That's When Your Heartaches Begin". He would later revisit the song in recording studios on at least two occasions, the first during the famous Million Dollar Quartet sessions on December 4, 1956, and the second in January 1957, when it was recorded and released as a B-side to "All Shook Up".

== Beatles performances ==
According to eminent author Mark Lewisohn (in "The Complete Beatles Chronicles" p. 364), the Beatles performed "That's When Your Heartaches Begin" during 1959–1961 (in Liverpool, Hamburg and elsewhere) with Paul McCartney on lead vocal. Author Allen J. Weiner adds (in The Beatles: The Ultimate Recording Guide, p. 5) that a home rehearsal recording from 1960 survives and has come out on several unauthorized releases. No other recording is known to exist.
