= USS Amphion (AR-13) =

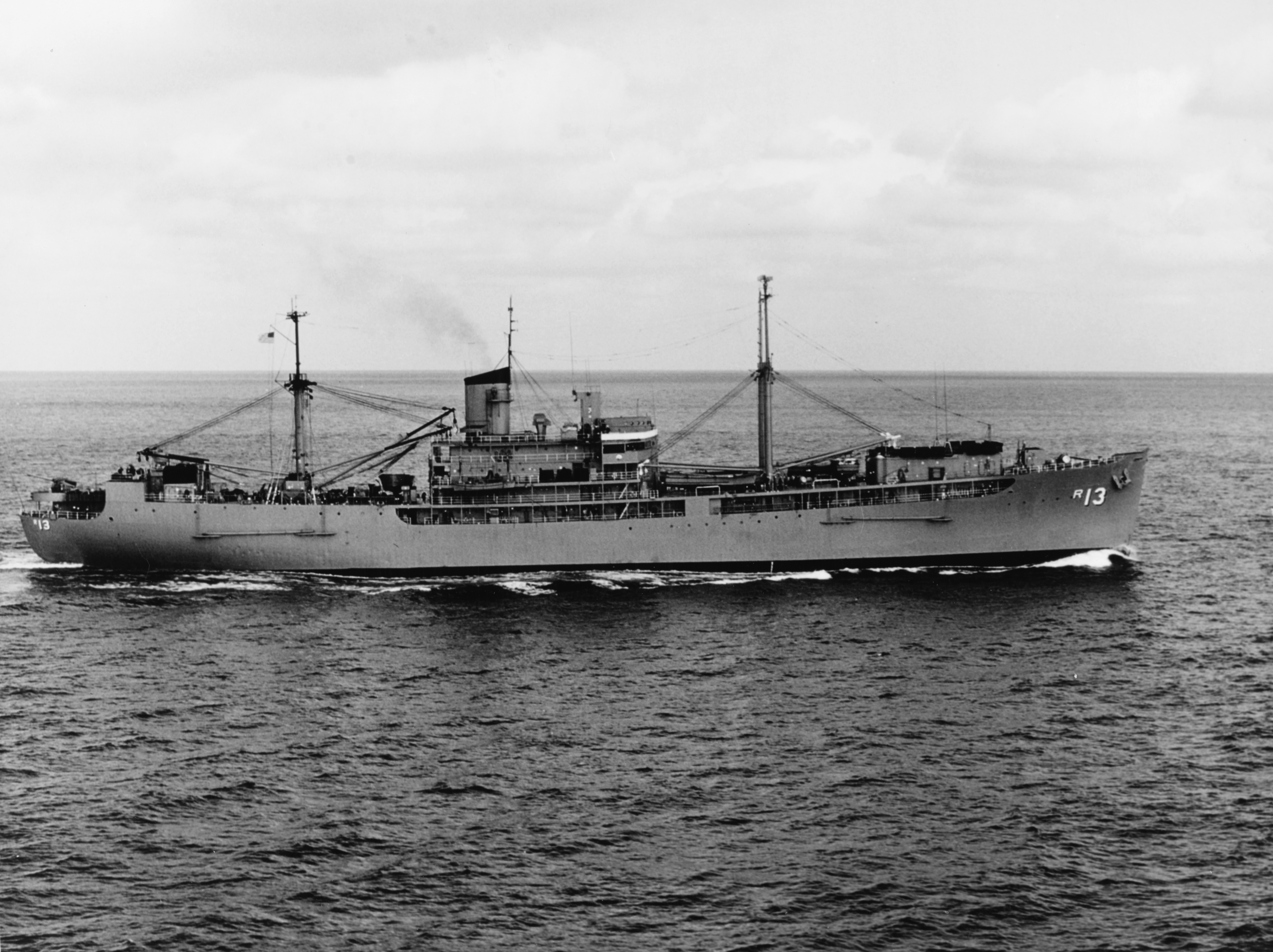
- USS Amphion underway off Hampton Roads, Virginia on 7 November 1969.

History

United States
- Name: USS Amphion
- Namesake: Amphion
- Builder: Tampa Shipbuilding Company
- Laid down: 20 September 1944
- Launched: 15 May 1945
- Sponsored by: Mrs. Howard D. Orem
- Commissioned: 30 January 1946
- Decommissioned: 2 October 1971
- Stricken: 1 March 1977
- Identification: AR-13
- Fate: transferred to Iran, 2 October 1971

Iran
- Name: IIS Chah Bahar
- Namesake: Chabahar
- Acquired: 2 October 1971; purchased outright, 1 March 1977
- Fate: Unknown

General characteristics
- Class & type: Amphion-class repair ship
- Displacement: 17,600 long tons
- Length: 492 ft (150 m)
- Beam: 69 ft 6 in (21.18 m)
- Draft: 26 ft 6 in (8.08 m)
- Speed: 16.5 knots (30.6 km/h; 19.0 mph)
- Complement: 921
- Armament: 2 × 5 in (127 mm) guns; 8 × 40 mm; 22 × 20 mm

USS Amphion (AR-13) was the lead ship of her class of repair ship built for the United States Navy during World War II. The second U.S. Navy vessel to be named Amphion, she was not commissioned until January 1946, five months after the end of the war. She was decommissioned in September 1971 and transferred to the Imperial Iranian Navy as IIS Chahbahan. She was purchased outright by Iran in March 1977. After the 1979 Iranian Revolution she remained in service with the Islamic Republic of Iran Navy through at least 1985. Her fate beyond that date is not reported in secondary sources.

== Career ==
Built on a United States Maritime Commission (MARCOM) C-3 hull type, Amphion was laid down on 20 September 1944 at Tampa, Florida, by the Tampa Shipbuilding Company and launched on 15 May 1945; sponsored by Mrs. Howard D. Orem, the wife of Captain Howard D. Orem, the aide and flag secretary to Admiral Ernest J. King; and commissioned at her builder's yard on 30 January 1946.

Designed and built to carry out a primary mission of making emergency and routine repairs to ships of the fleet during periods of technical availability, Amphion was equipped with a wide variety of repair shops: shipfitter, carpentry, pipe and copper, sheet metal, welding, canvas, watch, optical, foundry—in short, facilities that employed skilled artificers capable of repairing hardware from precision watches to heavy machinery and hulls. "These shops are limited in what they can do," boasts an early history of Amphion, "only by the size of their equipment." Her modern engineering plant could generate enough electricity for not only herself but ships moored alongside undergoing repairs. Her distilling plant could produce water for herself and for other vessels.

Following shakedown in the Chesapeake Bay area and availability at her builder's yard, Amphion joined the Atlantic Fleet's service force and was homeported at Norfolk, Virginia Operating at and out of Norfolk and Newport, Rhode Island, for the first decade of her service, she provided her repair services principally on the east coast of the United States. She also deployed to Bermuda on occasion, as well as to bases in Newfoundland and the Caribbean, carrying out port visits to such places as Ciudad Trujillo, the Dominican Republic; San Juan, Puerto Rico; and St. Thomas, Virgin Islands.

In 1952, singer Gene Vincent spent a two-week training period in her, having previously served on USS Chukawan.

During the summers of 1957 and 1958 Amphion deployed to the Mediterranean, servicing ships of the 6th Fleet and visiting ports in France, Greece, Crete, Sicily, and the Balearic Islands. Through the 1960s she operated along the Atlantic coast of the United States. In 1965, she supported naval contingency operations off the Dominican Republic; and, in 1968, she visited ports in Scotland and England.

Amphion departed Norfolk for the last time under the stars and stripes on 18 August 1971. After visiting Recife, Brazil 29 to 31 August, and Mombasa, Kenya 18 to 22 September, the repair ship reached her destination, Bandar Abbas, Iran, on 28 September. Decommissioned on 2 October 1971, Amphion was turned over to the Imperial Iranian Navy on that day. Renamed IIS Chah Bahar to honor the Iranian port of Chabahar on the Gulf of Oman, the ship was first commanded in Iranian service by Lieutenant Commander Arabshahi and based at Bandar Abbas. Purchased outright by Iran on 1 March 1977, Amphion's name was stricken from the U.S. Naval Vessel Register on the same date. Chah Bahar remained in service with the Iranian Navy into 1985.

As the lead ship of its class of repair ships only Amphion (AR-13) and sister ship Cadmus (AR-14) were completed. Deucalion (AR-15) and Mars (AR-16) were cancelled on August 12, 1945, while still under construction also being built at Tampa.
