= On a Little Street in Singapore =

Single by Frank Sinatra with the Harry James Orchestra
- B-side: "Who Told You I Cared?"
- Released: 1939
- Recorded: 13 October 1939 in Chicago, Illinois
- Genre: Traditional pop, jazz
- Label: Columbia; COL 35261
- Songwriters: Peter DeRose and Billy Hill

Frank Sinatra with the Harry James Orchestra singles chronology
"My Buddy" (1939)	"On a Little Street in Singapore" (1939)	"Ciribiribin (They're So In Love)" (1939)

"On a Little Street in Singapore" is a jazz song written by Peter DeRose and Billy Hill. It had some measure of popularity in the 1930s and 1940s, marked by a number of high-profile performances. Artists to cover the song included Frank Sinatra with Harry James, Dave Brubeck & Paul Desmond, Glenn Miller, Bert Kaempfert, Jimmy Dorsey and most recently Bob Dylan. Manhattan Transfer covered it again in 1978; the French-singing Belgian group Lou and the Hollywood Bananas, in a french adaptation (Dans les petites rues de Singapour), around 1983.

The music writer Will Friedwald places the song in a "long list of intercultural, interracial romances-that-can-never-be" likening the theme of the song to the "tragic mulatto syndrome" as identified by the film critic Donald Bogle. Friedwald categorises the song in this context with other Orientalist compositions such as "Poor Butterfly" and "Japanese Mammy".

Patrick Burke discussed Charlie Shavers' May 1940 recording of the song in his 2008 book Come In and Hear the Truth: Jazz and Race on 52nd Street writing that Shavers "evokes an exotic Orientalist atmosphere through the combination of an unusual melodic mode and a repeated figure in the bass and drums".

The Glenn Miller Orchestra released "On a Little Street in Singapore" with a vocal by Ray Eberle in May 1944. Anticipating the end of the Second World War, Billboard wrote that Miller would be "the hottest thing in band fronting" and described the song as "good, if a little dated" but concluded that "with tune and Miller sizzling what more can be desired?".

Reviewing Bob Dylan's album Fallen Angels which included the song, Michael Hann wrote in The Guardian that "On a Little Street in Singapore" was a "throwaway number" whose "strength is all in the melody" and lacked the "romantic profundity" of the other songs on the album.

The British figure skaters Jane Torvill and Christopher Dean performed their ice dance routine in figure skating at the 1980 Winter Olympics to "On a Little Street in Singapore".

== Frank Sinatra recording ==
"On a Little Street in Singapore" was one of the earliest recordings made by Frank Sinatra. It was recorded at a session with the Harry James Orchestra on 13 October 1939 at the same time as "Who Told You That I Cared?". It was later issued as a 78 rpm single. The arrangements of both songs at the session were written by Andy Gibson. Sinatra's version of the song was the first Sinatra recording that the future Frank Sinatra discographer Vito Marino heard. Will Friedwald, in his 1995 book Sinatra! the Song is You: A Singer's Art wrote that the recording finds Sinatra and James "making like two American sailors in a Far East opium den". Friedwald feels that Sinatra "plays it cautiously" on the song, staying close to the melody and beat, perhaps intimidated by the bolero rhythm of the song.
