= Tommy Facenda =

Singer, guitarist (1939–2022)

- Also known as: Bubba Facenda
- Born: November 10, 1939; Portsmouth, Virginia, U.S.
- Died: November 18, 2022 (aged 83) Portsmouth, Virginia, U.S.
- Genres: Rock and roll
- Occupations: Singer, guitarist
- Labels: Nasco, Atlantic

Eugene Thomas Facenda (November 10, 1939 – November 18, 2022), better known as Tommy Facenda, was an American rock and roll singer and guitarist. He is best known for his 1959 single "High School U.S.A."

== Life and career ==
Born Eugene Thomas Facenda in Portsmouth, Virginia, on November 10, 1939, he joined Gene Vincent's Blue Caps in 1957, where he performed as a backup vocalist and was given the nickname "Bubba". Facenda and Paul Peek became known as "The Clapper Boys" of Vincent's band, because of their trademark handclap style during live shows. Facenda toured with Vincent and appeared in films with him, but by 1958 had left Vincent to seek a solo career.

Facenda signed with Nasco Records and released his first single, "Little Baby" b/w "You Are My Everything". The single received no attention and he headed to New York City, where he met Frank Guida, the head of Legrand Records. Guida asked him to record a novelty song entitled "High School U.S.A.", in which Facenda listed names of high schools in his home state of Virginia. Atlantic Records picked up the song for national distribution and had him record 28 different versions of the tune, using regional high school names across the country. The song became a nationwide hit, reaching No. 30 on the Rhythm and Blues chart and No. 28 on the Billboard Hot 100 in 1959. All 28 regional versions were combined into one chart listing.

Facenda wrote and recorded a 1960 followup single, "Bubba Ditty", which failed to chart. He served in the military through 1962 and then worked as a firefighter in his hometown of Portsmouth. He toured again with the Blue Caps beginning in 1982, and did some stage acting, performing in a play entitled Just Us.

In 2012, the Rock and Roll Hall of Fame inducted Facenda as a member of the Blue Caps by a special committee, aiming to correct the previous wrong of not including the Blue Caps with Gene Vincent.

Facenda died in Portsmouth, Virginia, on November 18, 2022, at the age of 83.

== Discography ==
=== Singles ===
- "Little Baby" / "You're My Everything" – Nasco 6018 – 1958
- "High School U.S.A." (National version) / "Give Me Another Chance" – Legrand 1001 – 1959
- "High School U.S.A." (Regional versions, see below) / "Plea Of Love" – Atlantic 51–78 – 1959
- "Bubba Ditty" / "I Don't Know" – Atlantic 2057 – 1960
- "High School U.S.A." (National version) / "High School U.S.A." (Los Angeles Version) – Legrand 1001 (reissue)

=== Regional Atlantic Records releases of "High School U.S.A." ===
- Virginia—45–51
- New York City—45–52
- North & South Carolina—45–53
- Washington D.C. / Baltimore—45–54
- Philadelphia—45–55
- Detroit—45–56
- Pittsburgh—45–57
- Minneapolis/St. Paul—45–58
- Florida—45–59
- Newark, New Jersey—45–60
- Boston—45–61
- Cleveland—45–62
- Buffalo—45–63
- Hartford, Connecticut—45–64
- Nashville—45–65
- Indianapolis—45–66
- Chicago—45–67
- New Orleans—45–68
- St. Louis & Kansas City—45–69
- Georgia & Alabama—45–70
- Cincinnati—45–71
- Memphis—45–72
- Los Angeles—45–73
- San Francisco—45–74
- Texas—45–75
- Seattle, WA & Portland, OR—45–76
- Denver—45–77
- Oklahoma—45–78
