= William Raskin =

American songwriter (1896–1942)

- Born: 1896
- Died: 1942
- Occupation(s): Lyricist, composer

William Raskin, sometimes given as Willie Raskin, (November 3, 1896 – April 8, 1942) was an American songwriter and lyricist. After beginning his career as a journalist in New York, he became first a clerk and then a songwriter in Tin Pan Alley. He also wrote material for vaudeville. In the late 1920s he relocated to California at the time of the beginning of sound films; becoming one of the first songwriters to work in Hollywood in that newly created medium. Recordings of his work are catalogued in the Discography of American Historical Recordings by the University of California, Santa Barbara, the National Endowment for the Humanities and the Packard Humanities Institute.

== Life and career ==
William Raskin was born in New York City on November 3, 1896. He was educated at New York Public School 83 in Morris Park, Bronx, and began his career writing for the New York Morning Telegraph. He then worked as a clerk in various Tin Pan Alley music publishing firms before transitioning into a career as songwriter. In 1921 he co-authored the song "I Found a Rose in the Devil's Garden" with Fred Fisher. It was made into a popular piano roll by pianist and composer Pete Wendling who also arranged the music for that roll. It was also recorded for the Victor Talking Machine Company by the Sterling Trio in 1921; a group consisting of Albert Campbell, Henry Burr, and John H. Meyer.

With the advent of sound film in the late 1920s, Raskin relocated to California and was one the first songwriters to work on Hollywood films. For Paramount Pictures he co-authored the song "If I Give Up the Saxophone" with Sammy Fain and Irving Kahal for the 1929 short film A Ziegfeld Midnight Frolic in which it was sung by Eddie Cantor. The song was also performed in another 1929 Paramount short The Fatal Forceps starring Ford Sterling; and in another 1929 short film, Syncopated Trial, which was released by Pathé Exchange and used a script by Harry Delmar. The team of Fain, Kahal, and Raskin also co-wrote the song "Wedding Bells Are Breaking Up That Old Gang of Mine" which was featured in the Vitaphone Varieties film series in the 1930 short Wedding Belles starring Lorraine Howard and Florence Newton.

Raskin co-authored the 1937 song "That's When Your Heartaches Begin" which was initially recorded without much success by singer Bob Goday with the bandleader Shep Fields. It later became a hit song for The Ink Spots (1941, Decca Records), and an even bigger one for Elvis Presley whose 1957 recording of the song charted at number 57 on the Billboard Hot 100.

Raskin died on April 8, 1942 in New York City at the age of 45. In the year of his death he lived in a residence on Washington Avenue in Brooklyn.

== Songs ==
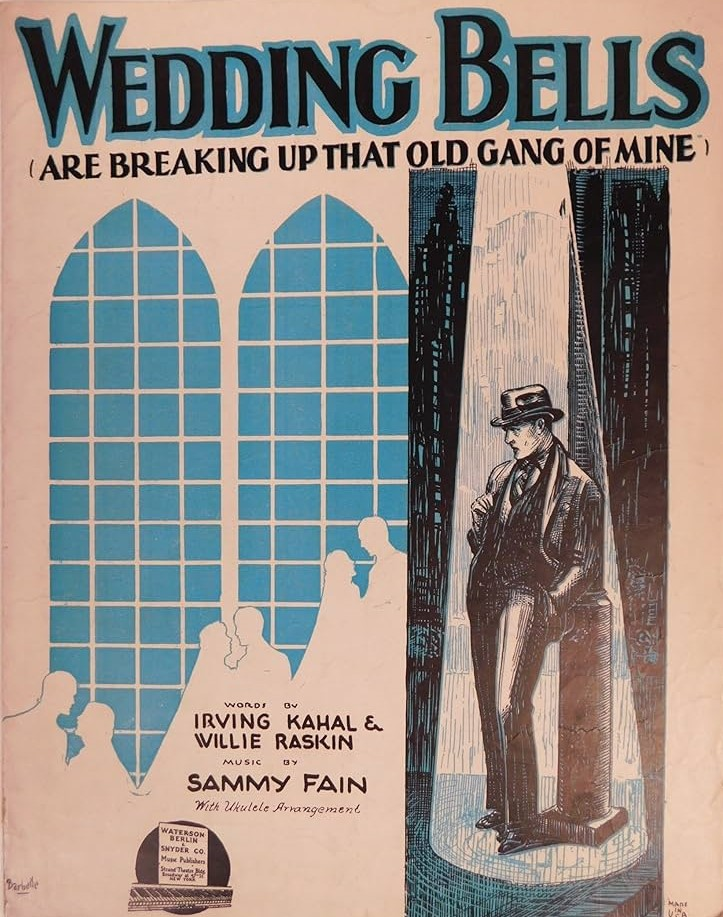
1929 sheet music for "Wedding Bells Are Breaking Up That Old Gang of Mine" which Raskin co-authored with Sammy Fain and Irving Kahal.

Recording of Eddie Cantor performing Oh Gee, Georgie on a 1924 recording

- "That Red Head Gal"
- "I'm Waiting for Ships That Never Come In"
- "They Cut Down the Old Pine Tree"
- "The Wedding Gown that Nellie Never Wore"
- "An Old Saddle for Sale"
- "I Found a Rose in the Devil's Garden"
- "Wedding Bells Are Breaking Up that Old Gang of Mine"
- "Fifty Million Frenchmen Can't Be Wrong"
- "She's Still My Baby"
- "We'll Always Remember Pearl Harbor"
- "O, Gee, Georgie!"
- "If There's a Lover's Lane in Paradise"
- "If I Give Up the Saxophone"
- "Singing in the Rain"
