= Peter DeRose =

American composer of jazz and pop music (1896–1953)

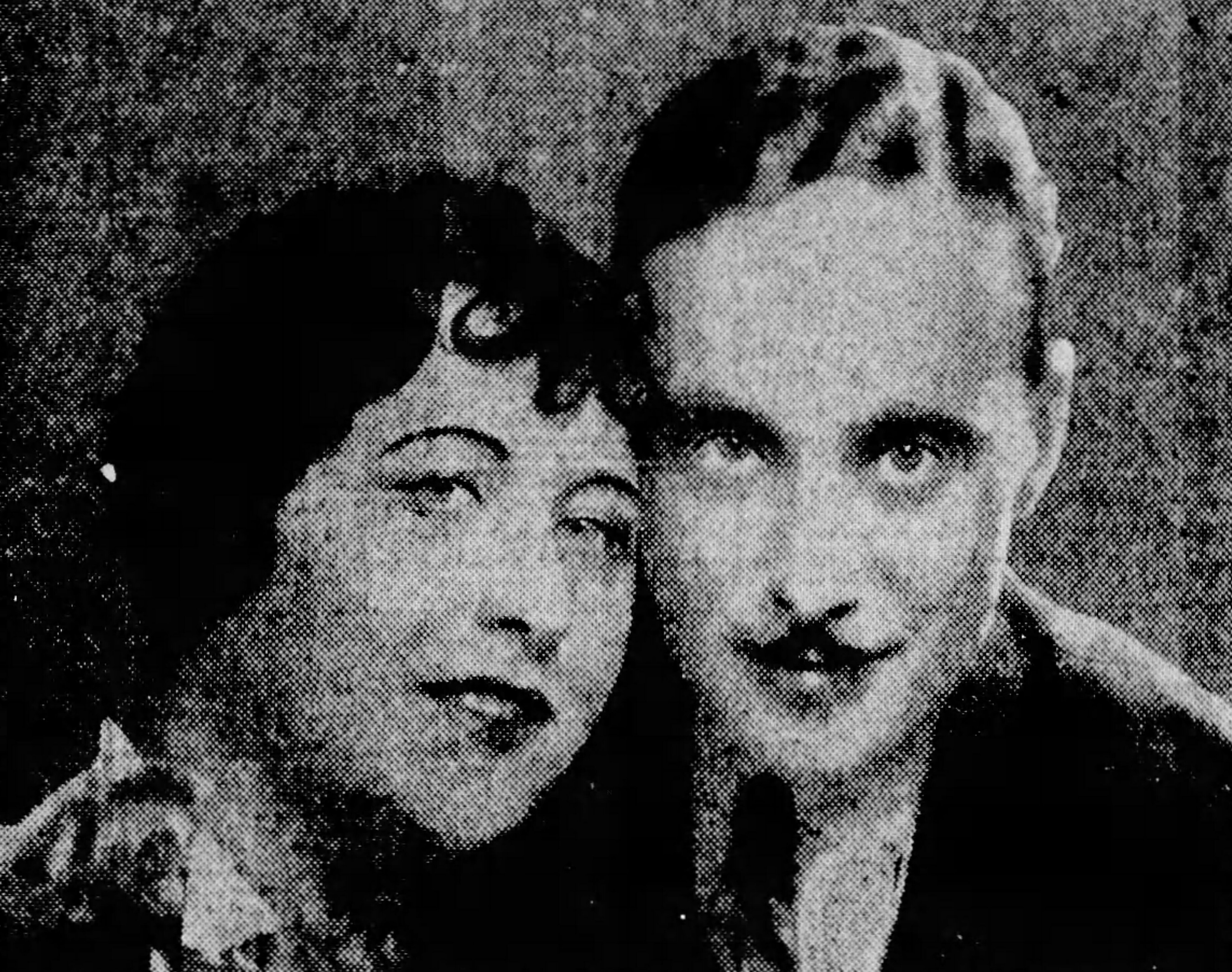
- May Singhi Breen (left) with DeRose, c. 1929

Background information
- Born: March 10, 1896; New York City, US
- Died: April 23, 1953 (aged 57) New York City, US
- Genres: Jazz, pop
- Occupation: Songwriter
- Instrument: Piano
- Years active: 1919–1953
- Formerly of: Charles Tobias, Al Stillman, Carl Sigman, Billy Hill

Peter DeRose (or De Rose; March 10, 1896 – April 23, 1953) was an American composer of jazz and pop music during the era of Tin Pan Alley. In 1970, he was inducted into the Songwriters Hall of Fame.

== Biography ==
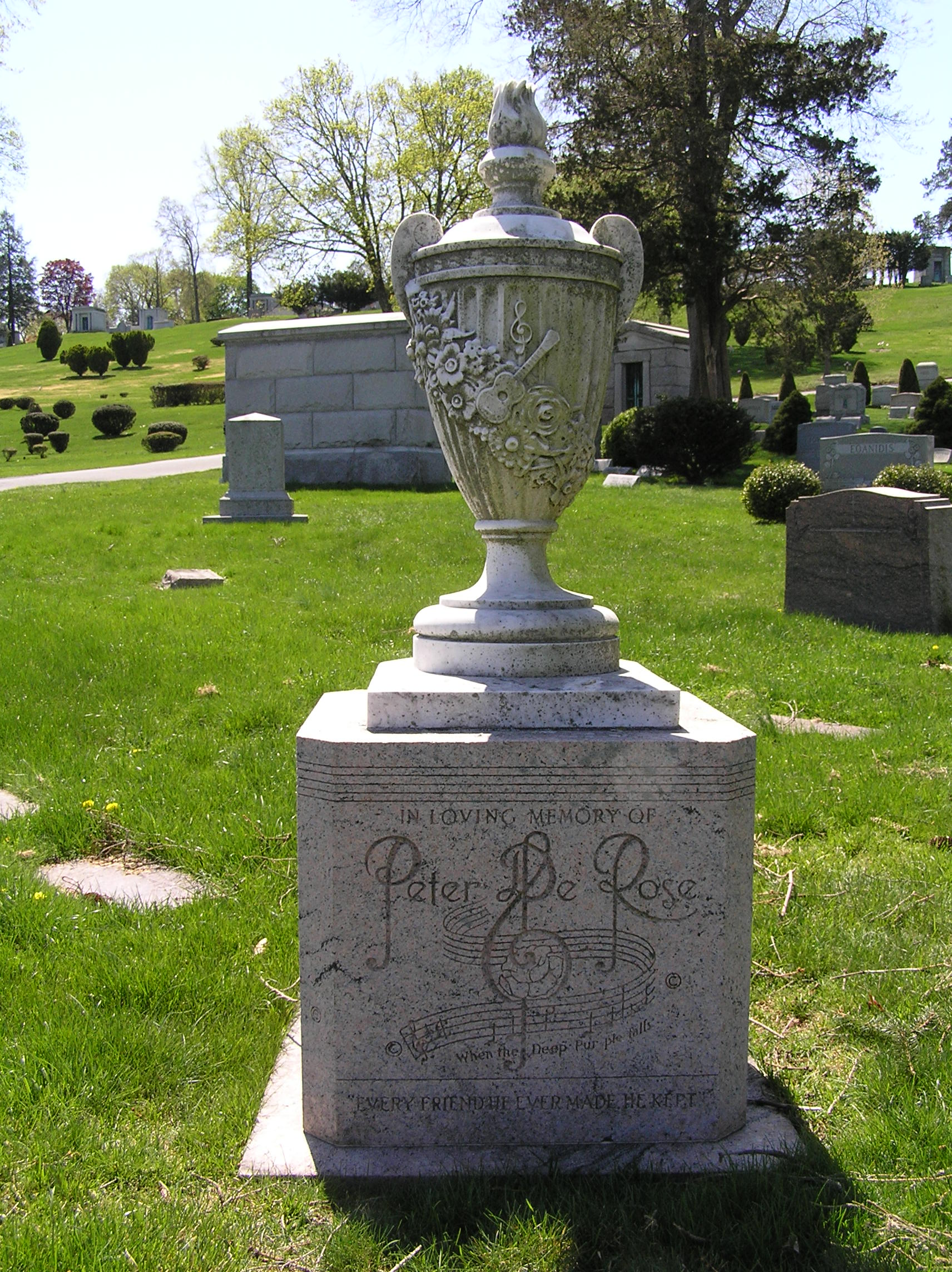
The monument of Peter De Rose

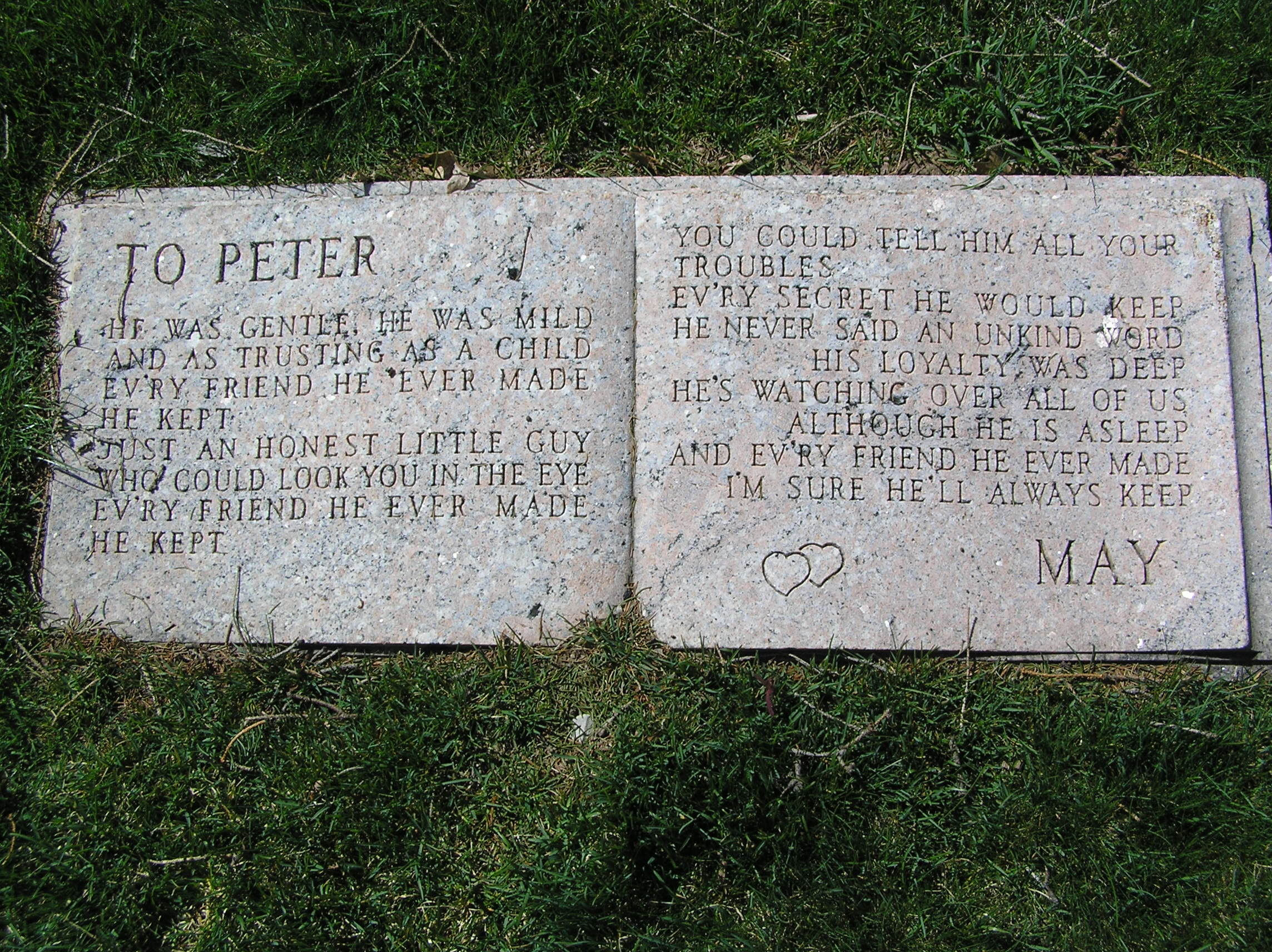
The epitaph letter from May to Peter

A native of New York City, a son of Anthony and Armelina Agresti De Rose, he showed a gift for all things musical at an early age. He learned to play the piano from an older sister. F.B. Haviland published his first song, "Tiger Rose Waltzes", when he was 18 years old. After graduating from DeWitt Clinton High School in 1917, he found a job at a music store as a stock room clerk. His composition "When You're Gone, I Won't Forget" led to a job at the New York office of Italian music publisher G. Ricordi & Co.

In 1923, DeRose met May Singhi Breen when she performed on radio with the ukulele group The Syncopators. A relationship developed, and she left the group to join DeRose in a musical radio show on NBC called The Sweethearts of the Air in which he played piano and she played ukulele. The show lasted for 16 years, during which time the two entertainers were married, in 1929. The show not only provided them with a good living, but was also a vehicle for introducing his compositions.

DeRose collaborated with lyricists such as Charles Tobias, Al Stillman, Carl Sigman, Billy Hill. His music has been recorded by John Coltrane, Spike Jones, Art Tatum, Les McCann, and Peggy Lee. He wrote songs for the Broadway musicals Yes Yes Yvette and Earl Carroll's Vanities of 1928. He also wrote music for the hit play Burlesque (1927).

"Deep Purple", DeRose's most famous song, was written in 1934 as a piano composition, with lyrics added a few years later by Mitchell Parish. It was a hit for Larry Clinton & His Orchestra in 1939 and was recorded by Artie Shaw, Glenn Miller, Duke Ellington, and Sarah Vaughan. In 1957, "Deep Purple" was a No. 20 hit record for Billy Ward & the Dominoes, then a No. 1 hit on the 1963 Billboard chart for Nino Tempo and April Stevens. It became popular again in 1976 in the duet by Donny and Marie Osmond.

In 1932, DeRose wrote music with radio star Phillips H. Lord for one of Lord's Seth Parker religious music books. DeRose also composed music for the 1941 Ice Capades show. In the late 1940s and early 1950s he wrote songs for several Hollywood films. His last hit was "You Can Do It", written shortly before his death in New York City in 1953. He is interred in Kensico Cemetery in Valhalla.

== Awards and honors ==
In 1970, Peter DeRose was inducted into the Songwriters Hall of Fame.

== Songs ==
- "Somebody Loves You" (1932) – Words by Charlie Tobias; recorded by Eddy Arnold in 1966
- "Wagon Wheels" (1934) – Used in the Broadway musical Ziegfeld Follies in 1934 and performed by Bing Crosby and Paul Robeson
- "Deep Purple" (1934) – Popularized by Larry Clinton and His Orchestra with Bea Wain and later by Nino Tempo and April Stevens as a duet
- "Rain" (1934) – Performed by Ella Fitzgerald
- "Have You Ever Been Lonely?" (1934) – A hit for the Paul Whiteman Orchestra, it was recorded by Teresa Brewer in 1960, Patsy Cline in 1961, and Jim Reeves in 1962.
- "On a Little Street in Singapore" (1938) – Performed by Harry James and Frank Sinatra
- "Lilacs in the Rain" (1939) – Written with Mitchell Parish, it was recorded by Tony Martin (1939), The Ravens (1949), Carl Perkins (pianist) (1955), Carmen McRae (1956), and Junior Mance (1959).
- "Buona Sera" – An international hit for Louis Prima in 1956
- "All I Need is You" (1942), co-written with Benny Davis and Mitchell Parish – Recorded in 1942 by Vaughn Monroe and His Orchestra, Gene Krupa and His Orchestra, Ella Fitzgerald and the Keys, Benny Goodman and his Orchestra with vocals by Peggy Lee, and in 1958 by Chris Connor
- "The Song of the Seabees" (1943) – Words by Sam M. Lewis
- "Autumn Serenade" (1945), co-written with Sammy Gallop – Recorded in 1945 by The Modernaires with Paula Kelly, it has been recorded many times over the years by artists including John Coltrane and Johnny Hartman (1963), June Christy, and Kurt Elling.
- "A Marshmallow World" (1949) – A Christmas song recorded by Bing Crosby, Johnny Mathis, Dean Martin, and Kim Stockwood (1999)
