= Cliff Gallup =

American guitarist (1930–1988)

Clifton E. Gallup (June 17, 1930 – October 9, 1988) was an American guitarist. He was the lead guitarist for Gene Vincent and the Blue Caps in the 1950s. Gallup's recording career was brief, including 35 songs with Vincent in 1956 plus a 1960s solo album, but he performed occasionally until the end of his life as a part-time hobby.

Critic Richie Unterberger describes Gallup as "one of the greatest guitarists in early rock & roll, and certainly one of the greatest rockabilly guitarists ever" with "phenomenal abilities".

== Biography ==
In February 1956, local radio DJ Sheriff Tex Davis (William Douchette, 1914–2007) heard Gene Vincent performing at a talent show in Norfolk, Virginia, became his manager, and assembled a band of local musicians to back him. The band included Gallup, who had previously played in a local band, the Virginians, and who was older than Vincent and most of the other band members. In May 1956, the band recorded in Nashville, Tennessee. Producer Ken Nelson had session musicians at the ready, assuming Vincent's band might not be prepared or accomplished enough to record. But as soon as Gallup played the solos on "Race with the Devil", Nelson knew the session musicians would not be needed.

Gallup played on 35 tracks with Vincent, including his biggest hit, "Be-Bop-A-Lula", and established a reputation as one of the most technically proficient guitarists in early rock and roll. As a married man, Gallup was reluctant to tour with Vincent, and left the band in late 1956, returning only for some more studio sessions that same year for the second LP by Vincent and His Blue Caps. In the mid-1960s Gallup made a solo album for the local Pussy Cat record label in Norfolk, Straight Down the Middle, in a more mellow instrumental style akin to that of Chet Atkins and Les Paul. Gallup occasionally played with local bands, while working full-time school maintenance. Gallup last performed in Norfolk with a group called the Hi-fi's, about 48 hours before he suffered a fatal heart attack.

At the time of Gallup's 1988 death, he was the director of maintenance and transportation for the Chesapeake, Virginia, city school system, where he worked for almost 30 years. At the request of his widow, obituaries in local newspapers made no mention of his time with Gene Vincent and His Blue Caps. He is remembered principally for his influence on such guitarists as Eric Clapton, Brian Setzer, and Jeff Beck. The latter recorded an album of Gene Vincent songs, Crazy Legs, in 1993 considered by music critics to be a tribute to Gallup and Vincent.

Gallup was ranked 79th by Rolling Stone magazine's David Fricke in his list of "100 Greatest Guitarists." He was inducted into the Rockabilly Hall of Fame and the Rock and Roll Hall of Fame.

== Guitar technique and equipment ==
Gallup's right-hand technique was based on using flat pick held between thumb and first finger, in conjunction with fingerpicks on his middle and ring fingers, while also using his little finger to work the vibrato bar. Unterberger laments Gallup's career was so short, given that his evident talent as a musician could have easily led to a prolific career as a session musician in the Nashville country music or Los Angeles rock and roll recording studios.

In his short time as lead guitarist in Blue Caps, Gallup played a 1954 Gretsch 6128 (Duo-Jet) probably fitted up with two DeArmond Dynasonic single coil pickups, an aluminum bridge (not a Melita bridge as previously thought), and a Bigsby vibrato tailpiece. For amplifiers he used a Standel 25L15 (26-Watts tube amp with a single 15-inch speaker) for studio works and a Fender tweed for the remainder.

According to one source, Gallup's trademark reverb sound was produced by echo units he constructed himself from old tape recorder parts, but according to another source it was created in the studio by Nelson.

== Discography ==
Tracks recorded with Gene Vincent in chronological order of the recording sessions.

The recording sessions were all done in three series at Bradley Film & Recording Studio, 804 16th Avenue South, Nashville, Tennessee, and produced by Ken Nelson.

A) One session on May 4, 1956

B) Four sessions on June 24–27, 1956

C) Four sessions on October 15–18, 1956

Session 1: May 4, 1956

1. "Race with the Devil" (Gene Vincent, Bill Davis), 2:02
2. "Be-Bop-A-Lula" (Gene Vincent, Bill Davis), 2:35
3. "Woman Love" (Jack Rhodes), 2:31
4. "I Sure Miss You" (Bill Davis, Eddie Bryan), 2:38

Session 2: June 24, 1956

1. "Jezebel" (Wayne Shanklin), 2:23
2. "Crazy Legs" (Jerry Reed), 2:09
3. "Peg o' My Heart" (Fred Fisher, Alfred Bryan), 2:35
4. "Wedding Bells (Are Breaking Up That Old Gang of Mine)" (Sammy Fain, Irving Kahal, Willie Raskin), 2:30

Session 3: June 25, 1956

1. "Waltz of the Wind" (Fred Rose), 2:42
2. "Up a Lazy River" (Hoagy Carmichael, Sidney Arodin), 2:20
3. "Ain't She Sweet" (Milton Ager, Jack Yellin), 2:29
4. "Gonna Back Up Baby" (Danny Wolfe), 2:24
5. "Race with the Devil" (Gene Vincent, Bill Davis), unissued / lost track

Session 4: June 26, 1956

1. "Who Slapped John" (Gene Vincent, Bill Davis), 1:56
2. "Jumps Giggles and Shout" (Gene Vincent, Bill Davis), 2:50
3. "Bluejean Bop" (Gene Vincent, Hal Levy), 2:21
4. "I Flipped" (Bobbie Carrol, Bill Hicks), 2:24

Session 5: June 27, 1956

1. "Bop Street" (Cliff Gallup, Bill Davis), 2:24
2. "Well, I Knocked Bim Bam" (Bobbie Carrol), 2:14
3. "You Told a Fib" (Cliff Gallup, Gene Vincent), 2:20
4. "Jump Back, Honey, Jump Back" (Hadda Brooks), 2:00

Session 6: October 15, 1956

1. "Teenage Partner" (version 1) (Gene Vincent, Bill Davis), 2:13
2. "Blues Stay Away from Me" (Alton & Rabon Delmore, Wayne Raney, P. Henry Glover), 2:16
3. "Five Feet of Lovin'" (version 1) (Buck Peddy, Mel Tillis), 2:07
4. "Cat Man" (Gene Vincent, Bill Davis), 2:18

Session 7: October 16, 1956

1. "Double Talkin' Baby" (Danny Wolfe), 2:12
2. "Hold Me, Hug Me, Rock Me" (Gene Vincent, Bill Davis), 2:14
3. "Unchained Melody" (Alex North, Hy Zaret), 2:37

Session 8: October 17, 1956

1. "B-I-Bickey-Bi Bo Bo Go" (Don Carter, Dub Nalls, Jack Rhodes), 2:15
2. "Pink Thunderbird" (Paul Peek, Bill Davis), 2:32
3. "Pretty, Pretty Baby" (Danny Wolfe), 2:27
4. "Cruisin'" (Gene Vincent, Bill Davis), 2:11

Session 9: October 18, 1956

1. "Important Words" (version 1) (Gene Vincent, Bill Davis), 2:21
2. "You Better Believe" (Cliff Gallup), 1:59
3. "Red Bluejeans and a Pony Tail" (Jack Rhodes, Bill Davis), 2:14
4. "Five Days, Five Days" (Jack Rhodes, Billy Willey, Freddie Franks), 2:36

Solo album

- Straight Down the Middle (mid-1960s, Pussy Cat label; recorded as "The Four C's featuring Gallopin' Cliff Gallup")
