= Paul Peek (musician) =

Early rockabilly pioneer

Paul Edward Peek Jr. (June 23, 1937 – April 3, 2001) was an early rockabilly pioneer. Peek was born in High Point, North Carolina, and was raised in Greenville, South Carolina. Paul learned to play the guitar, steel guitar, and bass while he was 12 years old. When he was 14 he played in several local country bands. He graduated from Greenville Senior High School in 1955 and performed on steel guitar with Claude Casey and the Sagedusters on WFBC-TV in 1955 on a weekly TV show. In 1956 Paul was recruited as an early member of Gene Vincent & The Blue Caps, sometimes stealing the limelight. As a member of the Blue Caps, Peek was one of the first rock artists to appear in the movies, appearing in The Girl Can't Help It (1956).

Peek had the distinction of being the first artist to record for National Recording Corporation out of Atlanta. In 1958, NRC 001 ("Sweet Skinny Jenny"/"The Rock-A-Round") was recorded at WGST Radio Station. In 1958 Paul recorded a novelty song, "Olds-Mo-William", and performed the song on Dick Clark's Saturday Night "Beech Nut" National TV Show. Because of distribution problems with NRC Records, the recording died before it could become a national hit. He also appeared on New York City's "The Big Beat" with host Alan Freed. Musicians who appeared on Peek's NRC singles included Joe South, Jerry Reed, Ray Stevens, and Sonny James. Eskew Reeder Jr, also known as Esquerita, was a co-writer and piano player on this first single. Reeder, a fellow Carolinian, was instrumental in developing the style popularized by Little Richard. Esquerita's wild recordings for Capitol Records are collector's items. The flip side of "Olds-Mo-William", "I'm Not Your Fool Anymore," has a fine vocal group backing up Paul, the members of which are unknown.

Peek's NRC recordings were bootlegged in Europe for years, and have now been re-released on CD by NRC. Although Peek recorded for several major labels, some of his most memorable recordings are the NRC singles, "Olds-Mo-William" and "The Rock-A-Round". Peek's biggest sellers were "Brother-In-Law (He's A Moocher)", (1961) produced by Joe South on Fairlane Records (distributed by King), reaching No. 84 on the Billboard Hot 100, and "Pin The Tail On The Donkey" (1966), another Joe South Production on CBS Records reaching No. 91 on the chart.

In early 1964, local Minneapolis band Gregory Dee & The Avanties had a big regional hit with a version of "Olds-Mo-William".

Although his national recording career waned, Peek continued to play music professionally, establishing a stage persona that made him a wildly popular nightclub performer in Atlanta, GA for decades. His Atlanta bands included some of the city's finest sidemen, including local guitar virtuoso Kenneth Watkins. In the early 1980s, he and Dickie Harrell, Bobby Jones, Bubba Facenda, and Johnny Meeks, all former Blue Caps, made the first of several appearances at rockabilly festivals in England. The Blue Caps' popularity was, and is, alive and well in Europe. It was only after his health began to decline that Paul Peek gave up performing publicly.

Peek died from cirrhosis in Lithonia, Georgia, on April 3, 2001, at the age of 63.

In 2012, the Rock and Roll Hall of Fame inducted Peek as a member of the Blue Caps by a special committee, aimed at correcting the previous mistake of not including the Blue Caps with Gene Vincent.
