= List of songs recorded by the Everly Brothers =

This is a list of Everly Brothers songs.

- The columns Song, Recorded, and Album list each song title, the recording date (as far as known), and the album on which the song first appeared.
- The column Author lists the writer or writers of each song.
- The column Notes gives further information. For some songs, several different tracks exist, on diverse releases; some of them are listed here, but not all.

This article does not list songs released solo by Don or Phil.

== Studio recordings ==
| Song | Author | Recorded | Album | Time | Notes |
|---|---|---|---|---|---|
| Abandoned Love | Bob Dylan | Spring 1985 | Born Yesterday | 4:02 | |
| A Change of Heart | Boudleaux & Felice Bryant | July 8, 1960 | A Date with the Everly Brothers | 2:07 | |
| Adeste Fideles | John Francis Wade, translation by Frederick Oakley | October 1, 1962 | Christmas with the Everly Brothers | 2:13 | |
| Ain't That Lovin' You, Baby | Jimmy Reed | February 19, 1964 | Gone, Gone, Gone | 2:05 | |
| A Kiss Is a Terrible Thing to Waste | Jim Steinman | 1986 | On the Wings of a Nightingale: The Complete Mercury Studio Recordings | 5:22 | |
| A Little Bit of Crazy | ? | April 28, 1967 | Chained to a Memory | | |
| All I Ask of Life | Don Everly | late 1956 / early 1957 | Too Good to Be True | 1:38 | Demo |
| All I Have to Do Is Dream | Boudleaux Bryant | March 6, 1958 | The Fabulous Style of the Everly Brothers (UK) | 2:21 | #1 on the US Hot 100, Country and R&B charts, plus UK and Canada |
| All We Really Want to Do | Delaney & Bonnie Bramlett | August 31, 1971 | Stories We Could Tell | 2:22 | |
| Always Drive a Cadillac | Larry Raspberry | Spring 1985 | Born Yesterday | 5:05 | |
| Always It's You | Felice & Boudleaux Bryant | March 18, 1960 | A Date with the Everly Brothers | 2:30 | |
| Am Abend auf der Heide (Evening on the Moor) | Eldo di Lazzaro / Richter | April 12 & 13, 1965 | The Price of Fame | 2:25 | |
| Amanda Ruth | Chip Kinman / Tony Kinman | Spring 1985 | Born Yesterday | 3:16 | |
| And I'll Go | Sonny Curtis | November 17, 1965 | Heartaches and Harmonies (track 37) | 2:17 | Other versions released on numerous CDs, e.g., track 16 on The Price of Fame |
| Angel of Darkness | Phil Everly / John Durrill | 1987 | Some Hearts | 3:48 | |
| Angels from the Realms of Glory | James Montgomery / Henry Thomas Smart / Edward Shippen Barnes | October 1, 1962 | Christmas with the Everly Brothers | 3:25 | Actually without Don and Phil's voices |
| A Nickel for the Fiddler | Guy Clark | July 25, 1972 | Pass the Chicken & Listen | 2:24 | |
| Any Single Solitary Heart | John Hiatt / Mike Porter | 1987 | Some Hearts | 4:12 | |
| Arms of Mary | Ian Sutherland | Spring 1985 | Born Yesterday | 2:27 | |
| Asleep | Don Everly | May 1984 | EB 84 | 4:10 | |
| Autumn Leaves | Joseph Kosma / Johnny Mercer | August 30, 1961 | Instant Party! | 2:56 | |
| A Voice Within | Terry Slater | May 10, 1967 | The Everly Brothers Sing | 2:23 | |
| Away in a Manger | ? | October 1, 1962 | Christmas with the Everly Brothers | 2:01 | Actually without Don and Phil's voices |
| A Whiter Shade of Pale | Gary Brooker / Keith Reid | June 20, 1967 | The Everly Brothers Sing | 4:55 | |
| Baby Bye Oh | Sharon Sheeley / Jackie DeShannon | April 19, 1963 | The Price of Fame | 3:12 | Just one take recorded, interrupted by giggling |
| Baby What You Want Me to Do | Jimmy Reed | July 8, 1960 | A Date with the Everly Brothers | 2:20 | |
| Bad Boy, Sad Girl | Phil Everly | 1956 | Like Strangers (Encore) | | Demo by Phil |
| Barbara Allen | Traditional, arr. Ike Everly | August 13, 16, 17, 1958 | Songs Our Daddy Taught Us | 4:42 | |
| Be-Bop-A-Lula | Gene Vincent / Bill "Sheriff Tex" Davis | November 3, 1957 | The Everly Brothers | 2:19 | |
| Be My Love Again | Don Everly | 1987 | Some Hearts | 4:36 | |
| Bird Dog | Boudleaux Bryant | July 10, 1958 | The Fabulous Style of the Everly Brothers (UK) | 2:14 | US #2 Hot 100, #1 Country; also Australia and Canada #1 |
| Blue Balloon | Phil Everly Terry Slater | October 1, 1968 | Not released | | Demo by Phil |
| Blueberry Hill | Al Lewis / Vincent Rose / Larry Stock | December 20, 1966 | The Hit Sound of the Everly Brothers | 3:02 | |
| Bonsoir Madame | Bud Dashiell (his title is Bonsoir Dame) | March 14, 1968 | Chained to a Memory | | Backing tracks only |
| Born to Lose | Ted Daffan ("Frankie Brown") | June 20, 1963 | The Everly Brothers Sing Great Country Hits | 2:24 | |
| Born Yesterday | Don Everly | Spring 1985 | Born Yesterday | 4:02 | Last Top 40 on any significant chart (#17 US Country and AC, #7 Canada Country, #12 Canada AC); first US Country Top 40 since 1961 |
| Bowling Green | Terry Slater (and uncredited Phil Everly) | March 22, 1967 | The Everly Brothers Sing | 2:48 | Demo by Phil from March 16, 1967, is on the Chained to a Memory box Last Top 40 hit on Billboard Hot 100 (#40) |
| Brand New Heartache | Boudleaux & Felice Bryant | August 16, 1957 | The Everly Brothers | 2:16 | |
| Brand New Tennessee Waltz, The | Jesse Winchester | August 23, 1971 | Stories We Could Tell | 3:11 | |
| Breakdown (A Long Way from Home) | Kris Kristofferson | August 28, 1971 | Stories We Could Tell | 3:13 | |
| Bring a Torch, Jeanette, Isabella | Émile Blémont, based on 16th century French Provence traditional song | October 1, 1962 | Christmas with the Everly Brothers | 1:30 | |
| Brown Eyes | Phil Everly / John Durrill | 1987 | Some Hearts | 2:41 | |
| Bully of the Town | Traditional, arr. Ike Everly | June 1, 1961 | Both Sides of an Evening | 2:01 | |
| Buona Fortuna Amore Mio | Don Everly / Specchia | March 11, 1965 | Susie Q | | Italian version of "So Sad (To Watch Good Love Go Bad)" |
| Burma Shave | Roger Miller | April 4, 1962 | The New Album | 2:28 | Several tracks appear on The Price of Fame |
| Bye Bye Blackbird | Mort Dixon / Ray Henderson | August 29, 1961 | Instant Party! | 3:18 | |
| Bye Bye Love | Felice & Boudleaux Bryant | March 1, 1957 | The Everly Brothers | 2:24 | US #2, US Country #1, first hit single for the Everly Brothers |
| Can't Dance Alone | Phil Everly | 1956 | Like Strangers (Encore) | | Demo by Phil |
| Can't Get Over It | Don Everly | 1987 | Some Hearts | 4:25 | |
| Captain, Captain | Phil Everly | 1960 | Give Me a Future | 2:11 | Demo by Phil |
| Carolina in My Mind | James Taylor | July 15, 1969 | Chained to a Memory | 3:19 | |
| Carol Jane | Dave Rich | March 17, 1960 | It's Everly Time | 1:51 | |
| Carolyn Walking Away | Jerry Allison / Sonny Curtis | February 28, 1968 | | | Never issued |
| Casey's Last Ride | Kris Kristofferson | August 31, 1969 | Chained to a Memory | 3:31 | Re-recorded 1971 |
| Cathy's Clown | Don Everly & Phil Everly | March 18, 1960 | A Date with the Everly Brothers | 2:25 | #1 in US Hot 100, US R&B, and UK |
| Chains | Carole King | July 11, 1962 | The Price of Fame | 2:19 | |
| Chlo-E | Neil Moret / Gus Kahn | June 1, 1961 | Both Sides of an Evening | 2:05 | |
| Christmas Eve Can Kill You | Dennis Linde | November 11, 1971 | Stories We Could Tell | 3:26 | |
| Claudette | Roy Orbison | March 6, 1958 | The Fabulous Style of the Everly Brothers (UK) | 2:13 | |
| Collector, The | Sonny Curtis / Everly Brothers | June 2, 1966 | Two Yanks in England | 2:55 | |
| Crying in the Rain | Carole King / Howard Greenfield | November 14, 1961 | The Golden Hits of the Everly Brothers | 1:59 | US #6 |
| Cuckoo Bird | Trad., adapted by Terry Slater | April 9, 1969 | Heartaches and Harmonies | 2:45 | |
| Dancing in the Street | William "Mickey" Stevenson / Marvin Gaye | December 3, 1964 | Rock & Soul | 2:37 | |
| Dancing on My Feet | Phil Everly | September 20, 1962 | The New Album | 1:54 | 1959 demo by Phil appears on Too Good to Be True |
| Danger Danger | Frankie Miller | May 1984 | EB 84 | 3:27 | |
| Deck the Halls | Traditional | October 1, 1962 | Christmas with the Everly Brothers | 1:32 | |
| Deep Water | Ron Elliot / Sal Valentino | July 19, 1968 | Chained to a Memory | | Backing tracks only |
| Deliver Me | Daniel Moore | June 21, 1967 | The Everly Brothers Sing | 2:31 | |
| Del Rio Dan | Doug Lubahn / Holli Lynn Beckwith | November 10, 1971 | Stories We Could Tell | 4:00 | |
| Devil's Child, The | Irwin Levine / Neil Sheppard | November 8, 1966 | The Hit Sound of the Everly Brothers | 2:40 | |
| Devoted to You | Boudleaux Bryant | July 10, 1958 | The Fabulous Style of the Everly Brothers (UK) | 2:25 | US #10, Canada #1 |
| Doll House Is Empty, The | Howard Greenfield / Jack Keller | January 22, 1966 | In Our Image | 2:00 | |
| Donna Donna | Boudleaux & Felice Bryant | July 13, 1960 | A Date with the Everly Brothers | 2:15 | |
| Don’t Ask Me to Be Friends | Gerry Goffin / Jack Keller | July 11, 1962 | Single only | 2:07 | First Phil Everly solo ever on the bridge |
| Don't Blame Me | Jimmy McHugh | May 30, 1961 | Both Sides of an Evening | 2:16 | |
| Don't Call Me, I'll Call You | Don Everly | 1960 | Give Me a Future | 1:18 | Demo by Don |
| Don't Forget to Cry | Boudleaux & Felice Bryant | May 4, 1964 | Single only | 2:08 | |
| Don't Let Our Love Die | Leslie York | ~1990 | Bringing It All Back Home BBC soundtrack | 2:18 | A radio performance from the early 50s was released on Heartaches and Harmonies |
| Don't Let the Whole World Know | Don & Phil Everly | December 2, 1964 | Bonus on the Rock & Soul + Beat & Soul reissue | 2:11 | |
| Don't Run and Hide | L. Ranford aka the Hollies | May 14, 1966 | Two Yanks in England | 2:37 | "The Hollies" are Allan Clarke, Tony Hicks and Graham Nash |
| Don't Say Goodnight | B. Neary / J. Photoglo | Spring 1985 | Born Yesterday | | |
| Don't Worry Baby | Brian Wilson/Roger Christian | 1987 | Some Hearts | 3:37 | A collaboration with the Beach Boys |
| Don't Ya Even Try | Don & Phil Everly | December 2, 1964 | Bonus on the Rock & Soul + Beat & Soul reissue | 1:59 | |
| Down in the Bottom | Willie Dixon | December 30, 1968 | Nice Guys | 2:34 | |
| Down in the Willow Garden | Traditional | August 13, 16, 17, 1958 | Songs Our Daddy Taught Us | 3:04 | |
| Do You | Sonny Curtis | May 10, 1967 | The Everly Brothers Sing | 2:47 | |
| Do You Love Me | Don Everly | 1959 or 1960 | Too Good to Be True | 1:54 | Demo by Don |
| Drop Out, The | Don Everly | January 23, 1964 | Gone, Gone, Gone | 2:18 | |
| Du Bist Nicht So Wie Die Andern | Charlie Niessen / Ritter | September 16 +17, 1963 | The Everly Brothers in Deutschland (EP) | 2:27 | |
| Ebony Eyes | John D. Loudermilk | November 1, 1960 | The Golden Hits of the Everly Brothers | 3:06 | US #8, UK #1 |
| Empty Boxes | Ron Elliott | March 21, 1968 | The New Album | 2:46 | |
| Even if I Hold It in My Hand | Don Everly? | January 6, 1967 | Heartaches and Harmonies | 2:58 | |
| Facts of Life, The | Don Everly | January 16, 1964 | Gone, Gone, Gone | 2:07 | |
| Ferris Wheel, The | Ronald & Dewayne Blackwell | May 4, 1964 | Gone, Gone, Gone | 2:19 | |
| Fifi the Flea | L. Ransford aka The Hollies | May 14, 1966 | Two Yanks in England | 2:42 | Don solo |
| First in Line, The | Paul Kennerley | May 1984 | EB 84 | 2:57 | |
| The First Noel | Traditional | October 1, 1962 | Christmas with the Everly Brothers | 2:27 | |
| Following the Sun | Don Everly | May 1984 | EB 84 | 3:31 | |
| Follow Me | Boudleaux Bryant / Don Everly | April 4, 1965 | Single only | 2:00 | |
| Foolish Doubts | Bernie Baum? | September 14, 1962 | The Price of Fame | 2:49 | Take 2 |
| From Eden to Caanan | Robert J. Kessler / Robert William Scott | April 15, 1969 | Nice Guys | 5:31 | |
| The Girl Can't Help It | Bobby Troup | June 7, 1965 | Beat & Soul | 2:10 | Don solo |
| Girl Sang the Blues, The | Barry Mann / Cynthia Weil | September 8, 1963 | Heartaches and Harmonies | 2:21 | |
| Girls Girls Girls (What a Headache) | Gary Usher | April 20, 1963 | Bonus on The Everly Brothers Sing Great Country Hits / Gone, Gone, Gone reissue | 1:53 | |
| Give Me a Future | Don Everly | Late 1956 / early 1957 | The Complete Cadence Recordings 1957–1960 | 1:45 | Demo |
| Give Me a Sweetheart | John D. Loudermilk | December 2, 1964 | Bonus on the Rock & Soul + Beat & Soul reissue | 2:11 | |
| Glitter and Gold | Barry Mann / Cynthia Weil | January 7, 1966 | In Our Image | 2:40 | |
| Glory Road | Neil Diamond | March 28, 1969 | Chained to a Memory | 3:16 | |
| God Rest You Merry Gentlemen | Traditional | October 1, 1962 | Christmas with the Everly Brothers | 1:26 | |
| Gone, Gone, Gone | Don & Phil Everly | September 8, 1964 | Gone, Gone, Gone | 2:07 | |
| Goodbye Summer Sun | Phil Everly / Terry Slater | October 1, 1968 | | | Unreleased |
| Good Golly Miss Molly | Robert Blackwell / John Marascalco | January 5, 1967 | The Hit Sound of the Everly Brothers | 2:49 | |
| Good Hearted Woman | Waylon Jennings / Willie Nelson | July 26, 1972 | Pass the Chicken & Listen | 2:34 | |
| Grandfather's Clock | Henry Clay Work | May 30, 1961 | Both Sides of an Evening | 2:22 | |
| Gran Mamou | Traditional | September 1, 1961 | The New Album | 2:27 | |
| Green River | Don & Phil Everly | August 27, 1971 | Stories We Could Tell | 4:44 | A version #1 was recorded on July 1, 1968 |
| Ground Hawg | Trad., arr. Ike Everly | August 30, 1961 | Instant Party! | 2:05 | |
| Hard Hard Year | L. Ransford aka the Hollies | May 14, 1966 | Two Yanks in England | 2:56 | |
| Hark! The Herald Angels Sing | William Hayman Cummings | October 1, 1962 | Christmas with the Everly Brothers | 2:07 | |
| Have You Ever Loved Somebody | L. Ransford aka the Hollies | May 14, 1966 | Two Yanks in England | 2:55 | |
| Hello Amy | Don Everly | February 19, 1964 | Bonus on the reissue of The Everly Brothers Sing Great Country Hits / Gone, Gone, Gone | 2:17 | A demo by Don is on Give Me a Future |
| Her Love Was Meant for Me | Phil Everly | ca. 1960 | Give Me a Future | 2:04 | Demo by Phil |
| Hernando's Hideaway | Richard Adler / Jerry Ross | September 1, 1961 | Bonus on Both Sides of an Evening / Instant Party | 2:31 | |
| He's Got My Sympathy | Gerry Goffin / Jack Keller | November 14, 1961 + July 11, 1962 | The New Album | 2:07 | |
| Hey Doll Baby | Titus Turner | August 15, 1957 | The Everly Brothers | 2:07 | |
| Hey Good Lookin' | Hank Williams | September 21, 1967 | Chained to a Memory | — | Fragment on take 7 of "You're Just What I Was Looking For Today" |
| Hi Heel Sneakers | Robert Higgenbotham | June 8, 1965 | Beat & Soul | 3:15 | Don solo |
| Hi-Lili, Hi-Lo | Bronislaw Kaper / Helen Deutsch | May 31, 1961 | Both Sides of an Evening | 1:44 | |
| Honolulu | Boudleaux Bryant | May 5, 1964 | Gone, Gone, Gone | 1:51 | |
| House of the Rising Sun | Trad., adapted by Alan Price | January 6, 1967 | The Hit Sound of the Everly Brothers | 4:36 | Don solo |
| Hound Dog | Jerry Leiber / Mike Stoller | December 1, 1964 | Rock & Soul | 1:57 | |
| How Can I Meet Her? | Gerry Goffin / Jack Keller | April 4, 1962 | The Golden Hits of the Everly Brothers | 1:49 | |
| How Did We Stay Together | Don Everly | 1956/1957 | Too Good to Be True | 1:12 | A 1958 demo is on Give Me a Future |
| Human Race | Don Everly | January 9, 1970 | Single only | 3:00 | A take from Nov 27, 1968, is on Chained to a Memory |
| Husbands And Wives | Roger Miller | July 27, 1972 | Pass the Chicken & Listen | 2:23 | |
| I Almost Lost My Mind | Ivory Joe Hunter | June 8, 1965 | Beat & Soul | 2:37 | |
| I Can't Be Myself | Merle Haggard | July 24, 1972 | Chained to a Memory | 2:57 | |
| I Can't Recall | Phil Everly | 1958 | The Complete Cadence Recordings 1957–1960 | 1:14 | Demo by Phil |
| I Can't Say Goodbye To You | Gerry Goffin / Carole King | September 17, 1962 | The New Album | 2:12 | |
| (I'd Be) A Legend in My Time | Don Gibson | January 5, 1967 | The Hit Sound of the Everly Brothers | 2:47 | |
| I Didn't Meant to Go This Far | Don Everly | 1956/1957 | Too Good to Be True | 1:20 | Demo |
| I Don't Want to Love You | Don & Phil Everly | March 22, 1967 | The Everly Brothers Sing | 2:48 | |
| If Her Love Isn't True | Don & Phil Everly | November 9, 1955 | Nashville Tennessee 9th November 1955 (EP) | 2:10 | |
| I Got a Woman | Ray Charles | December 1, 1964 | Rock & Soul | 2:10 | |
| I Know Love | Brain Neary / Jim Photoglo | Spring 1985 | Born Yesterday | 2:36 | |
| I'll Be Gone | Unknown | March 16, 1967 | Chained to a Memory | | Backing tracks only |
| I'll Bide My Time | Phil Everly | 1960 | Give Me a Future | 1:24 | Demo by Phil |
| Illinois | Randy Newman | September 30, 1968 | Roots | 2:12 | |
| I'll Never Get Over You | Don & Phil Everly | April 4, 1965 | In Our Image | 2:09 | |
| I'll See Your Light | Bodie Chandler / Edward Mckendry | September 18 & 25, 1965 | The New Album | 2:36 | |
| I'll Throw Myself at You | Don Everly | 1956/1957 | Too Good to Be True | 1:21 | Demo |
| I'm Afraid | Jay Gordon-Tintle | January 28, 1963 | The Golden Hits of the Everly Brothers | 1:58 | |
| I'm Alone Because I Love You | Ira Schuster / Joe Young | July 27, 1972 | Chained to a Memory | | |
| I'm Finding It Rough | Patrick Campbell-Lyons / Chris Thomas | June 22, 1967 | The Everly Brothers Sing | 2:47 | |
| I'm Gonna Make Real Sure | Phil Everly | 1960 | Give Me a Future | 1:41 | Demo by Phil |
| I'm Gonna Move to the Outskirts of Town | Andy Razaf / William Weldon / Roy Jacobs | November 13, 1961 | Rock & Soul | 2:54 | |
| I'm Here to Get My Baby out of Jail | Carl Davis / Harty Taylor | August 13, 16, 17, 1958 | Songs Our Daddy Taught Us | 3:38 | |
| I'm Moving On | Hank Snow | January 5, 1967 | The Hit Sound of the Everly Brothers | 2:28 | |
| I'm Not Angry | Jimmy Howard | November 14, 1961 | The Golden Hits of the Everly Brothers | 2:03 | |
| I'm on My Way Home Again | Don Everly | April 15, 1969 | Chained to a Memory | 2:20 | |
| I'm So Lonesome I Could Cry | Hank Williams | June 21, 1963 | The Everly Brothers Sing Great Country Hits | 2:55 | |
| I'm Takin’ My Time | Rick Beresford & Patrick Alger | May 1984 | EB 84 | | |
| I'm Tired of Singing My Song in Las Vegas | Don Everly | September 5, 1971 | Stories We Could Tell | 3:14 | Don solo |
| I'm Walking Proud | Gerry Goffin / Carole King | April 20, 1963 | The Price of Fame | | Backing tracks only |
| In the Good Old Days (When Times Were Bad) | Dolly Parton | December 27, 1968 | Nice Guys | | |
| I Think of Me | Don Everly | January 23, 1964 | Bonus on The Everly Brothers Sing Great Country Hits / Gone Gone Gone reissue | 1:59 | |
| It Only Costs a Dime | Don & Phil Everly | April 4, 1965 | In Our Image | 1:57 | |
| It's All Over | Don Everly | November 12, 1965 | In Our Image | 2:19 | Lead vocal by Phil |
| It's Been a Long Dry Spell | John D. Loudermilk | September 8, 1964 | Gone, Gone, Gone | 2:30 | |
| It's Been Nice | Doc Pomus / Mort Shuman | May 3, 1961 | Single only | 2:05 | |
| It's My Time | John D. Loudermilk | March 14, 1968 | Single only | | Also on Chained to a Memory; Last UK Top 40 (#39) |
| It's Too Late to Say Goodbye | Don Everly | 1956/1957 | Too Good to Be True | 1:32 | Demo by Don |
| I Used to Love You | Sonny Curtis | November 12, 1965 | In Our Image | 2:15 | |
| I’ve Been Wrong Before | L. Ransford aka the Hollies | June 2, 1966 | Two Yanks in England | 2:13 | |
| I Walk the Line | Johnny Cash | June 21, 1963 | The Everly Brothers Sing Great Country Hits | 2:40 | |
| I Want You to Know | Fats Domino / Dave Bartholomew | March 18, 1960 | It's Everly Time | 2:01 | |
| I Wonder If I Care As Much | Don & Phil Everly | March 1, 1957 | The Everly Brothers | 2:17 | Rerecorded September 17, 1968, for Roots |
| Jezebel | Wayne Shanklin | August 30, 1961 | Instant Party! | 2:22 | |
| Julianne | Pat Alger/J. Fred Knobloch | 1987 | Some Hearts | 3:05 | |
| June Is as Cold as December | Marge Barton | January 7, 1966 | In Our Image | 2:52 | |
| Just in Case | Boudleaux Bryant | March 22, 1960 | It's Everly Time | 2:12 | |
| Just One Time | Don Gibson | June 20, 1963 | The Everly Brothers Sing Great Country Hits | 2:19 | |
| Kansas City | Jerry Leiber / Mike Stoller | December 3, 1964 | Rock & Soul | 2:25 | |
| Keep a-Knockin' | Little Richard | November 3, 1957 | The Everly Brothers | 2:18 | |
| Keep a-Lovin’ Me | Don & Phil Everly | November 9, 1955 | Nashville Tennessee 9th November 1955 (EP) | 2:27 | First studio recording of the Everly Brothers |
| Kentucky | Carl Davis | August 13, 16, 17, 1958 | Songs Our Daddy Taught Us | 3:10 | |
| Kiss Me Once | Don Everly | 1958 | Too Good to Be True | 1:24 | Demo by Don |
| Kiss Your Man Goodbye | Don & Phil Everly | June 2, 1966 | Two Yanks in England | 2:35 | |
| Ladies Love Outlaws | Lee Clayton | July 27, 1972 | Pass the Chicken & Listen | 3:13 | |
| Lady Anne | Phil Everly / Terry Slater | October 1, 1968 | Chained to a Memory | | Demo by Phil |
| La Luna E un Pallido Sole | Ingrosso / Mogul | April 26, 1965 | Bonus on the Rock & Soul + Beat & Soul reissue | 2:19 | In Italian |
| Lay Lady Lay | Bob Dylan | May 1984 | EB 84 | 3:12 | |
| Lay It Down | Gene Thomas | July 24, 1972 | Pass the Chicken & Listen | 3:18 | |
| Lay Me Down | Dennis Linde | November 9, 1971 | Chained to a Memory | | |
| Leave My Girl Alone | Kenny Lynch / Bill Giant / Bernie Baum / Florence Kaye | February 3, 1966 | In Our Image | 2:22 | |
| Leave My Woman Alone | Ray Charles | November 3, 1957 | The Everly Brothers | 2:36 | |
| Less of Me | Glen Campbell | July 16, 1968 | Roots | 3:03 | |
| Let It Be Me | Mann Curtis / Gilbert Bécaud | December 15, 1959 | The Fabulous Style of the Everly Brothers (UK) | 2:39 | US #7 |
| Let's Go Get Stoned | Nicholas Ashford / Valerie Simpson / Josephine Armstead | January 5, 1967 | The Hit Sound of the Everly Brothers | 3:07 | |
| Life Ain’t Worth Living | Don & Phil Everly | Late 1956 / early 1957 | The Complete Cadence Recordings 1957–1960 | 1:22 | Demo |
| Lightning Express | Bradley Kincaid | August 13/16/17, 1958 | Songs Our Daddy Taught Us | 4:53 | |
| Like Everytime Before | L. Ransford aka The Hollies | May 14, 1966 | Two Yanks in England | 1:56 | Phil solo |
| Like Strangers | Boudleaux Bryant | February 18, 1960 | The Fabulous Style of the Everly Brothers (UK) | 2:02 | |
| Little Hollywood Girl | Gerry Goffin / Jack Keller | March 31, 1962 | The New Album | 2:23 | |
| Little Old Lady | Hoagy Carmichael / Stanley Adams | June 1, 1961 | Both Sides of an Evening | 2:24 | |
| Living Too Close to the Ground | Terry Slater | October 7, 1968 | Roots | 2:16 | Don solo |
| Lonely Avenue | Doc Pomus | June 8, 1965 | Beat & Soul | 2:33 | |
| Lonely Island | Boudleaux Bryant | November 1, 1960 | Gone, Gone, Gone | 2:15 | |
| Lonely Street | Kenny Sowder / Carl Belew / W.S. Stevenson | June 21, 1963 | The Everly Brothers Sing Great Country Hits | 2:22 | |
| Lonely Weekends | Charlie Rich | December 2, 1964 | Rock & Soul | 1:59 | |
| Long Lost John | Traditional, Arr. Ike Everly | August 31, 1961 | Instant Party! | 1:50 | |
| Long Time Gone | Leslie York | August 13/16/17, 1958 | Songs Our Daddy Taught Us | 2:26 | Composer is misidentified on the record label as Frank Hartford & Tex Ritter. Their "Long Time Gone" is actually a completely different song. The original recording of this "Long Time Gone" was by The York Brothers. |
| Lord of the Manor | Terry Slater | February 27, 1968 | Heartaches and Harmonies | 4:51 | Written by Don and Phil |
| Love Her | Barry Mann / Cynthia Weil | September 6, 1963 | Heartaches and Harmonies | 2:19 | |
| Love Hurts | Boudleaux Bryant | July 13, 1960 | A Date with the Everly Brothers | 2:23 | Rerecorded December 3, 1964, for Rock & Soul |
| Love Is All I Need | Felice & Boudleaux Bryant | September 8, 1964 | Gone, Gone, Gone | 1:55 | |
| Love Is Strange | Mickey Baker / Ethel Smith / Sylvia Vanderpool | June 7, 1965 | Beat & Soul | 2:53 | Last UK Top 20 (#11) |
| Love Is Where You Find It | Nacio Herb Brown / Earl K. Brent | May 31, 1961 | Both Sides of an Evening | 1:48 | |
| Love Makes the World Go 'Round | Bob Merrill | November 13, 1961 | Instant Party! | 2:43 | |
| Love of My Life | Boudleaux & Felice Bryant | October 13, 1958 | The Fabulous Style of the Everly Brothers (UK) | 2:07 | |
| Love of the Common People | John Hurley / Ronnie Wilkins | September 14, 1967 | Heartaches and Harmonies | 3:26 | |
| Love With Your Heart | Don & Phil Everly | March 21, 1968 | Susie Q | | A version #2 was recorded on December 30, 1968 |
| Lovey Kravezit | Howard Greenfield / Jack Keller | January 22, 1966 | In Our Image | 2:37 | |
| Lucille | Al Collins / Little Richard | July 8, 1960 | A Date with the Everly Brothers | 2:29 | |
| Made to Love | Phil Everly | July 10, 1960 | A Date with The Everly Brothers | 2:04 | A 1959 demo by Phil is on Too Good to Be True |
| Maiden's Prayer | Bob Wills | July 27, 1972 | Home Again (RCA compilation) | | |
| Mama Tried | Merle Haggard | July 20, 1968 | Roots | 2:18 | |
| Mandolin Wind | Rod Stewart | September 4, 1971 | Stories We Could Tell | 3:01 | |
| Man with Money | Don & Phil Everly | June 9, 1965 | Beat & Soul | 2:19 | |
| Mary Jane | Terry Slater | April 28, 1967 | The Everly Brothers Sing | 3:01 | |
| Maybelline | Chuck Berry / Russ Fratto / Alan Freed | December 3, 1964 | Rock & Soul | 1:52 | |
| Maybe Tomorrow | Don & Phil Everly | August 15, 1957 | The Everly Brothers | 2:09 | A demo is on Too Good to Be True |
| Memories Are Made Of This | Terry Gilkyson / Richard Dehr / Frank Miller | March 24, 1960 | It's Everly Time | 2:35 | |
| Mention My Name in Sheboygan | Bob Hilliard / Dick Sanford / Sammy Mysels | May 30, 1961 | Both Sides of an Evening | 1:51 | |
| Mercy, Mercy, Mercy | Joe Zawinul | June 20, 1967 | The Everly Brothers Sing | 2:28 | |
| Milk Train | Tony Romeo | July 1, 1968 | Heartaches and Harmonies | 2:48 | |
| Money (That's What I Want) | J. Bradford / Berry Gordy Jr. | June 7, 1965 | Beat & Soul | 2:30 | |
| More Than I Can Handle | Pete Wingfield / Mike Vernon | May 1984 | EB 84 | 2:58 | |
| Mr. Soul | Neil Young | December 27, 1968 | Nice Guys | | A take from January 14, 1969, is on Chained to a Memory |
| Muskrat | Merle Travis / Tex Ann / Harold Hensley | June 1, 1961 | Both Sides of an Evening | 2:14 | |
| My Babe | Willie Dixon | June 7, 1965 | Beat & Soul | 2:40 | |
| My Elusive Dreams | Claude ‘Curly’ Putman/Billy Sherrill | September 14, 1967 | Chained to a Memory | | |
| My Gal Sal | Paul Dresser | May 31, 1961 | Both Sides of an Evening | 2:50 | |
| My Little Yellow Bird | Don Everly | April 1, 1969 | Heartaches and Harmonies | 2:05 | |
| My Love She Waits At Home | Phil Everly | 1956 | Like Strangers (Encore) | | Demo by Phil |
| My Mammy | Walter Donaldson / Samuel M. Lewis / Joseph Young | May 30, 1961 | Both Sides of an Evening | 2:15 | |
| My Mom & Dad | Phil Everly / Terry Slater | October 1, 1968 | | | Never released |
| Nancy's Minuet | Don Everly | June 24, 1962 | The New Album | 2:04 (Ver.1) | Several versions were recorded and released on CD |
| Nashville Blues | Boudleaux & Felice Bryant | March 8, 1960 | It's Everly Time | 2:39 | |
| Nice Guy | Gerry Goffin / Carole King | June 25, 1962 | Nice Guys | 2:05 | |
| Nighttime Girl | Al Kooper / Irwin Levine | November 19, 1965, | The Price Of Fame | 2:21 | Backing tracks only |
| No Never | Phil Everly | 1956 | Like Strangers (Encore) | | Demo by Phil |
| Non Mandami Amore Mio | Gerry Goffin / Jack Keller | March 11, 1965 | Susie Q | | "How Can I Meet Her?" in Italian |
| Non Mi Resti Che Tu | Lojacono / Nisa | April 26, 1965 | Bonus on the Rock & Soul + Beat & Soul reissue | 2:14 | In Italian |
| No One Can Make My Sunshine Smile | Gerry Goffin / Jack Keller | September 14 & 20, 1962 | Heartaches and Harmonies | 1:57 | |
| Not Fade Away | Norman Petty / Buddy Holly | July 25, 1972 | Pass the Chicken & Listen | 2:01 | Written for the Everly Brothers |
| Nothing but The Best | unknown | December 9, 1966 | Susie Q | | |
| Nothing Matters but You | Gary Geld / Peter Udell | September 18, 1965 | The New Album | 2:15 | |
| Now Is the Hour | Maewa Kaihau / Clement Scott / Dorothy Stewart | May 31, 1961 | Both Sides of an Evening | 2:38 | |
| Oh, Boy! | Bill Tilghman / Sonny West / Norman Petty | January 5, 1967 | The Hit Sound of the Everly Brothers | 2:47 | |
| Oh Lonesome Me | Don Gibson | June 21, 1963 | The Everly Brothers Sing Great Country Hits | 2:17 | |
| Oh! My Papa (O Mein Papa) | Paul Burkhard / John Turner / Geoffrey Parsons | September 1, 1961 | Instant Party! | 2:09 | |
| Oh So Many Years | Frankie Bailes | August 13/16/17, 1958 | Songs Our Daddy Taught Us | 2:37 | |
| Oh True Love | Boudleaux & Felice Bryant | March 18, 1960 | It's Everly Time | 2:13 | |
| Oh What a Feeling | Don Everly | July 7, 1959 | The Fabulous Style of the Everly Brothers (UK) | 2:07 | A demo appears on Give Me a Future |
| O Little Town Of Bethlehem | Lewis Henry Redner / Bishop Phillips Brooks | October 1, 1962 | Christmas with the Everly Brothers | 2:13 | |
| Omaha | Don Everly | November 26, 1968 | The New Album | 3:19 | |
| On the Wings of a Nightingale | Paul McCartney | May 1984 | EB 84 | 2:33 | Written for the Everly Brothers; Last Top 10 on any US chart (#9 AC); first AC chart single since 1962 |
| Only Me | Don Everly | 1960 | Give Me a Future | 3:03 | Demo |
| Paradise | John Prine | July 25, 1972 | Pass the Chicken & Listen | 3:37 | |
| Party's Over, The | Jule Styne / Betty Comden / Adolph Green | August 31, 1961 | Instant Party! | 2:17 | |
| People Get Ready | Curtis Mayfield | June 7, 1965 | Beat & Soul | 2:05 | |
| Please Help Me, I'm Falling | Don Robertson / Hal Blair | June 21, 1963 | The Everly Brothers Sing Great Country Hits | 2:24 | |
| Poems, Prayers, and Promises | John Denver | September 2, 1971 | Heartaches and Harmonies | 4:02 | |
| Poor Jenny | Boudleaux & Felice Bryant | March 2, 1959 | The Fabulous Style of the Everly Brothers (UK) | 2:20 | Two versions: ten o’clock version and one o’clock version |
| Portuguese Bend | Terry Slater Phil Everly? | February 28, 1968 | | | Never released |
| Pretty Flamingo | Mark Barkan | June 3, 1966 | Two Yanks in England | 2:36 | |
| Price of Love, The | Don & Phil Everly | April 4, 1965 | In Our Image | 2:07 | Last UK Top 10 hit (#2) |
| Problems | Boudleaux & Felice Bryant | October 13, 1958 | The Fabulous Style of the Everly Brothers (UK) | 1:59 | US #2 |
| Put My Little Shoes Away | Traditional, arr. Ike Everly | August 13/16/17, 1958 | Songs Our Daddy Taught Us | 3:21 | |
| Radio & TV | Boudleaux & Felice Bryant | July 27, 1960 | Gone, Gone, Gone | 2:14 | |
| Release Me | Eddie Miller / Dub Williams / Robert Yount | June 20, 1963 | The Everly Brothers Sing Great Country Hits | 2:21 | |
| Ride the Wind | Phil Everly / John Durrill | 1987 | Some Hearts | 3:29 | |
| Ridin’ High | Dennis Linde | November 8, 1971 | Stories We Could Tell | 2:41 | |
| Ring around My Rosie | Ronald Blackwell | May 5, 1964 | The Price of Fame | 2:34 | |
| Rip It Up | Robert A. Blackwell & John S. Marascalco | November 3, 1957 | The Everly Brothers | 2:16 | |
| Rocking Alone (In an Old Rocking Chair) | Bob Miller | August 13/16/17, 1958 | Songs Our Daddy Taught Us | 3:01 | |
| Rocky Top | Boudleaux & Felice Bryant | July 24, 1972 | Pass the Chicken & Listen | 2:53 | |
| Roving Gambler | Traditional, arr. Merle Travis | August 13, 16, 17, 1958 | Songs Our Daddy Taught Us | 3:41 | |
| Sag’ auf Wiedersehen | Halletz/Nicolas | April 12 & 13, 1965 | Susie Q | 2:04 | |
| Sally Sunshine | Phil Everly | 1958 | The Complete Cadence Recordings 1957–1960 | 1:51 | Demo by Phil |
| Sea of Heartbreak | Hal David / Paul Hampton | December 20, 1966 | The Hit Sound of the Everly Brothers | 2:22 | |
| See See Rider | Ma Rainey | June 7, 1965 | Beat & Soul | 2:12 | |
| Send Me the Pillow That You Dream On | Hank Locklin | June 20, 1963 | The Everly Brothers Sing Great Country Hits | 2:32 | Re-recorded July 27, 1972, released on Chained to a Memory |
| Shady Grove | Traditional | July 17, 1968 | Roots | 2:31 | |
| Sheik of Araby, The | Ted Snyder / Harry Smith / Francis Wheeler | August 31, 1961 | Instant Party! | 2:00 | Solo version by Don was also recorded |
| She Never Let Me Drink | Phil Everly / Terry Slater | October 1, 1968 | | | Unreleased |
| She Never Smiles Anymore | Jimmy Webb | November 9, 1966 | The Hit Sound of the Everly Brothers | 3:19 | |
| Shop Girl | Phil Everly / Terry Slater | October 1, 1968 | Chained to a Memory | | Demo by Phil |
| Should We Tell Him | Don & Phil Everly | August 16, 1957 | The Everly Brothers | 2:03 | A demo was released on Too Good to Be True |
| Sigh, Cry, Almost Die | Don & Phil Everly | July 13, 1960 | A Date with the Everly Brothers | 2:18 | |
| Signs That Will Never Change | L. Ransford aka The Hollies | May 14, 1966 | Two Yanks in England | 3:05 | |
| Silent Night | Franz Xaver Gruber English words: John Freeman Young | October 1, 1962 | Christmas with the Everly Brothers | 2:57 | |
| The Silent Treatment | Al Hoffman / Dick Manning | July 10, 1960 | The New Album | 2:16 | |
| Silver Threads and Golden Needles | Dick Reynolds / Jack Rhodes | June 20, 1963 | The Everly Brothers Sing Great Country Hits | 2:16 | |
| Since You Broke My Heart | Don Everly | December 15, 1959 | The Fabulous Style of the Everly Brothers (UK) | 1:57 | Two demo versions are on Give Me a Future and Too Good to Be True |
| Sing Me Back Home | Merle Haggard | July 16, 1968 | Roots | 5:18 | |
| Sleepless Nights | Boudleaux & Felice Bryant | March 8, 1960 | It's Everly Time | 2:24 | |
| Slippin’ and Slidin’ | Little Richard /Edwin J. Bocage/ Al Collins/ James Smith | December 1, 1964 | Rock & Soul | 1:57 | |
| So Fine | Johnny Otis | December 1, 1964 | Rock & Soul | 1:59 | |
| So How Come (No One Loves Me) | Boudleaux & Felice Bryant | July 10, 1960 | A Date with the Everly Brothers | 2:18 | |
| (So It Was, So It Is) So It Always Will Be | Arthur Altman | January 27, 1963 | Heartaches and Harmonies | 1:52 | |
| So Lonely | L. Ransford aka The Hollies | June 2, 1966 | Two Yanks in England | 2:40 | |
| Somebody Help Me | Jackie Edwards | June 3, 1966 | Two Yanks in England | 2:02 | Also on The Everly Brothers Sing |
| Somebody Nobody Knows | Kris Kristofferson | July 26, 1972 | Pass the Chicken & Listen | 3:37 | |
| Some Hearts | Don Everly | 1987 | Some Hearts | 5:22 | |
| Some Sweet Day | Boudleaux & Felice Bryant | March 22, 1960 | It's Everly Time | 2:25 | |
| So Sad (To Watch Good Love Go Bad) | Don Everly | March 24, 1960 | It's Everly Time | 2:30 | US #7 |
| Stained Glass Morning | Scott McKenzie | November 10, 1969 | Nice Guys | 5:14 | |
| Step It Up and Go | Jimmy Howard | November 13, 1961 | Instant Party! | 1:58 | |
| Sticks and Stones | Titus Turner / Henry Glover | January 5, 1967 | The Hit Sound of the Everly Brothers | 2:48 | |
| Stick with Me Baby | Mel Tillis | July 27, 1960 | A Date with the Everly Brothers | 1:57 | First version recorded July 12, 1960 |
| Stories We Could Tell | John B. Sebastian | November 24, 1971 | Stories We Could Tell | 3:21 | |
| Story of Me, The | Jeff Lynne | May 1984 | EB 84 | 4:10 | |
| Sun Keeps Shining, The | Don & Phil Everly | November 9, 1955 | Nashville Tennessee 9th November 1955 (EP) | 3:08 | |
| Survival of the Fittest | Mel Tillis | July 25, 1972 | Chained to a Memory | 2:39 | |
| Susie | Mayer/Kurt Hertha | September 16+17, 1963 | The Everly Brothers in Deutschland (EP) | | |
| Susie Q | Dale Hawkins / Stan J. Lewis / Eleanor Broadwater | December 1, 1964 | Rock & Soul | 1:58 | A version sung in Italian was released on Susie Q |
| Sweet Dreams | Don Gibson | June 20, 1963 | The Everly Brothers Sing Great Country Hits | 2:48 | |
| Sweet Memories | Mickey Newbury | July 24, 1972 | Pass the Chicken & Listen | 2:55 | |
| Sylvie | ? | August 25, 1971 | | | Never issued, presumed lost |
| Take a Message to Mary | Boudleaux & Felice Bryant | March 2, 1959 | The Fabulous Style of the Everly Brothers (UK) | 2:28 | |
| Talking to the Flowers | Terry Slater | June 21, 1967 | The Everly Brothers Sing | 2:57 | |
| Temptation (#2) | Nacio Herb Brown / Arthur Freed | November 1, 1960 | The Golden Hits of the Everly Brothers | 2:18 | First attempt recorded September 17, 1960; Last UK #1 |
| T for Texas | Jimmie Rodgers | July 20, 1968 | Roots | 3:31 | |
| That'll Be the Day | Jerry Allison / Buddy Holly / Norman Petty | December 3, 1964 | Rock & Soul | 2:22 | |
| That Silver Haired Daddy of Mine | Gene Autry | August 13/16/17, 1958 | Songs Our Daddy Taught Us | 3:09 | |
| That's Just Too Much | Don & Phil Everly | July 13, 1960 | A Date with the Everly Brothers | 2:40 | |
| That's Old Fashioned | Bill Giant / Bernie Baum / Florence Kaye | November 14, 1961 | The Golden Hits of the Everly Brothers | 2:23 | US #9; last US Top 10 on Hot 100 |
| That's the Life I Have to Live | Don & Phil Everly | November 9, 1955 | Nashville Tennessee 9th November 1955 (EP) | 2:14 | |
| That's Too Good to Be True | Don Everly | late 1956 / early 1957 | Too Good to Be True | 1:56 | |
| That's What You Do to Me | Earl Sinks / Bob Montgomery | March 24, 1960 | It's Everly Time | 2:04 | |
| That Uncertain Feeling | Steve Gould | spring 1985 | Born Yesterday | 3:12 | |
| These Shoes | Larry Lee / Jon Goin | spring 1985 | Born Yesterday | 3:44 | |
| They Smile for You | Phil Everly / Terry Slater | June 22, 1967 | Chained to a Memory | | Backing track |
| Thinkin’ 'Bout You | Larry Henley / Billy Burnette | Spring 1985 | Born Yesterday | 2:48 | |
| This Is the Last Song I'm Ever Going to Sing | Sonny Curtis / Jerry Allison | June 21, 1963 | The Everly Brothers Sing Great Country Hits | 2:18 | |
| This Little Girl of Mine | Ray Charles | November 3, 1957 | The Everly Brothers | 2:18 | |
| Three-Armed Poker Playin’ River Rat | Dennis Linde | November 11, 1971 | Stories We Could Tell | 2:45 | |
| Three Bands of Steel | Don Everly | 1987 | Some Hearts | 2:45 | |
| Till I Kissed You | Don Everly | July 7, 1959 | The Fabulous Style of the Everly Brothers (UK) | 2:24 | |
| Torture | John D. Loudermilk | September 8, 1964 | Gone, Gone, Gone | 2:22 | |
| To Show I Love You | Tony Hatch | May 2, 1965 | Susie Q | 2:37 | |
| Trains and Boats and Planes | Burt Bacharach / Hal David | January 5, 1967 | The Hit Sound of the Everly Brothers | 3:03 | |
| Trouble | ? | April 19, 1963 | Nice Guys | 1:56 | Take 5 is a bonus track on the reissue of The Everly Brothers Sing Great Country Hits + Gone, Gone, Gone |
| Trouble In Mind | Richard M. Jones | November 13, 1961 | Instant Party! | 2:32 | |
| True Love | Cole Porter | August 29, 1961 | Instant Party! | 2:05 | |
| Turn Around | Ron Elliott / Bob Durand | July 12, 1968 | Roots | 2:47 | |
| Turned Down | Phil Everly | 1960 | Give Me a Future | 1:19 | Demo by Phil |
| Up in Mabel's Room | Phil Everly /Terry Slater | January 12, 1972 | Stories We Could Tell | 3:16 | Phil solo |
| Ventura Boulevard | Ron Elliot / Sal Valentino | July 12, 1968 | Roots | 2:50 | |
| Wake Up Little Susie | Boudleaux & Felice Bryant | August 15, 1957 | The Everly Brothers | 2:03 | Their first #1 in US (#1 on Billboard Hot 100, Country, and R&B charts) |
| Walking the Dog | Rufus Thomas | June 8+9, 1965 | Beat & Soul | 2:39 | |
| Walk Right Back | Sonny Curtis | September 17, 1960 | The Golden Hits of the Everly Brothers | 2:18 | US #7, UK #1 |
| Warum (Why) | Dobschinsky / Hans Bradtke | September 16+17, 1963 | The Everly Brothers in Deutschland (EP) | 2:15 | |
| Watchin’ It Go | Gene Thomas | July 261972 | Pass the Chicken & Listen | 2:26 | |
| Wayward Wind, The | Herb Newman / Stan Lebowsky | May 31, 1961 | Both Sides of an Evening | 2:26 | |
| Weight, The | Robbie Robertson | July 18, 1968 | Chained to a Memory | — | No master was produced |
| Wenn du mich küsst (Whenever You Kiss Me) | Erwin Halletz / Nicolas | April 12 & 13, 1965 | Single for the German market | 2:10 | Also on The Price of Fame |
| We Wish You a Merry Christmas | Traditional | October 1, 1962 | Christmas with the Everly Brothers | 1:21 | |
| What about Me | Gerry Goffin / Carole King | June 25, 1962 | Nice Guys | 2:03 | |
| What Am I Living For | Fred Jay / Art Harris | June 8 & 9, 1965 | Beat & Soul | 3:05 | |
| What Child Is This? | William Chatterton Dix | October 1, 1962 | Christmas with the Everly Brothers | 2:18 | |
| Whatever Happened to Judy | Sonny Curtis | January 28, 1963 | The Price of Fame | 2:36 | |
| What Kind of Girl Are You | Ray Charles | March 8, 1960 | It's Everly Time | 1:57 | |
| When Eddie Comes Home | Jimmy Webb | November 8, 1966 | Chained to a Memory | 2:45 | |
| When I Grow Too Old to Dream | Sigmund Romberg /Oscar Hammerstein ll | May 30, 1961 | Both Sides of an Evening | 2:30 | |
| When It's Night-Time in Italy It's Wednesday Over Here | James Kendis / Lew Brown | September 1, 1961 | Instant Party! | 2:03 | |
| When Will I Be Loved | Phil Everly | February 18, 1960 | The Fabulous Style of the Everly Brothers (UK) | 2:03 | US #8 |
| When Snowflakes Fall in the Summer | Barry Mann / Cynthia Weil | September 6, 1963 | The New Album | 2:16 | |
| Who's Gonna Shoe Your Pretty Little Feet | Traditional, arr. Ike Everly | August 13, 16, 17, 1958 | Songs Our Daddy Taught Us | 2:41 | |
| Who's to Be the One | Phil Everly | 1960 | Give Me a Future | 2:05 | Demo by Phil |
| (Why Am I) Chained to a Memory | Edward A. Snyder / Richard Ahlert | February 3, 1966 | In Our Image | 2:07 | |
| Why Not | John D. Loudermilk | November 1, 1960 | The New Album | 2:43 | |
| Why Worry | Mark Knopfler | Spring 1985 | Born Yesterday | 4:49 | |
| Will I Ever Have a Chance Again | Don Everly | 1960 | Give Me a Future | 1:37 | Demo by Don |
| Wishing Won't Make It So | Phil Everly | 1958 | The Complete Cadence Recordings 1957–1960 | 2:02 | Demo by Phil |
| Woman Don't You Try to Tie Me Down | Joe Allen | July 26, 1972 | Pass the Chicken & Listen | 4:01 | |
| Wo sind die schönen Tage (Where Are the Good Days) | Charlie Niessen / Hans Bradtke | September 16+17, 1963 | The Everly Brothers in Deutschland (EP) | | |
| You Can Bet (aka Tell Me Do) | Phil Everly | 1956/1957 | The Complete Cadence Recordings 1957–1960 | 1:29 | Demo by Phil |
| You Can Fly | Don Everly | 1956/1957 | Give Me a Future | 1:55 | |
| You Done Me Wrong | Ray Price / George Jones | April 10, 1968 | Roots | 2:16 | |
| (You Got) The Power of Love | Joey Cooper / Delaney Bramlett | February 3, 1966 | In Our Image | 2:37 | |
| You Make It Seem So Easy | Don Everly | May 1984 | EB 84 | 3:12 | |
| You're Just What I Was Looking for Today | Gerry Goffin / Carole King | September 21, 1967 | Heartaches and Harmonies | 3:08 | |
| You're My Girl | Don & Phil Everly | December 2, 1964 | Heartaches and Harmonies | 2:27 | |
| You're the One | Phil Everly | 1960 | Give Me a Future | 2:03 | |
| You're the One I Love | Boudleaux & Felice Bryant | May 4, 1964 | The Price of Fame | 2:02 | |
| You Thrill Me | Boudleaux & Felice Bryant | March 17, 1960 | It's Everly Time | 2:05 | |
| Yves | Scott McKenzie | November 11, 1969 | Chained to a Memory | 3:39 | |
| Zwei Gitarren am Meer | Funk / Michael Holm | April 12 & 13, 1965 | The Price of Fame | 2:38 | |

== Live recordings ==
| Song | Author | Performed | Album | Time | Notes |
|---|---|---|---|---|---|
| The Price of Love | Don & Phil Everly | September 22 & 23, 1983, Royal Albert Hall, London, UK | The Reunion Concert (1983) | 3:56 | |
| Walk Right Back | Sonny Curtis | September 22 & 23, 1983, Royal Albert Hall, London, UK | The Reunion Concert (1983) | 3:53 | |
| Claudette | Howard Greenfield / Roy Orbison | September 22 & 23, 1983, Royal Albert Hall, London, UK | The Reunion Concert (1983) | 2:37 | |
| Crying in the Rain | Howard Greenfield / Carole King | September 22 & 23, 1983, Royal Albert Hall, London, UK | The Reunion Concert (1983) | 4:05 | |
| Love Is Strange | Mickey Baker / Ethel Smith / Sylvia Vanderpool | September 22 & 23, 1983, Royal Albert Hall, London, UK | The Reunion Concert (1983) | 4:16 | |
| When Will I Be Loved? | Phil Everly | September 22 +23, 1983; Royal Albert Hall, London, UK | The Reunion Concert (1983) | 3:19 | |
| Bird Dog | Boudleaux Bryant | September 22 & 23, 1983, Royal Albert Hall, London, UK | The Reunion Concert (1983) | 2:37 | |
| Barbara Allen | Traditional | September 22, 1983, Royal Albert Hall, London, UK | The Reunion Concert (1983) | 1:38 | Played the first night only |
| Lightning Express | Bradley Kincaid | September 22 & 23, 1983, Royal Albert Hall, London, UK | The Reunion Concert (1983) | 1:55 | |
| Put My Little Shoes Away | Trad., arr. Ike Everly | September 22 & 23, 1983, Royal Albert Hall, London, UK | The Reunion Concert (1983) | 2:05 | |
| Down in the Willow Garden | Traditional | September 22 & 23, 1983, Royal Albert Hall, London, UK | The Reunion Concert (1983) | 3:36 | |
| Step It Up and Go | Arr. Don Everly | September 22 & 23, 1983, Royal Albert Hall, London, UK | The Reunion Concert (1983) | 1:03 | |
| Medley: Take a Message to Mary, Maybe Tomorrow, I Wonder if I Care As Much | Boudleaux & Felice Bryant / Don & Phil Everly | September 22 & 23, 1983, Royal Albert Hall, London, UK | A Night at the Royal Albert Hall (2002) | 2:20 | |
| Medley: Devoted to You, Ebony Eyes, Love Hurts | Boudleaux & Felice Bryant / John D. Loudermilk | September 22 +23, 1983; Royal Albert Hall, London, UK | A Night at the Royal Albert Hall (2002) | 3:20 | |
| Long Time Gone | Frank Hartford / Tex Ritter | September 22 & 23, 1983, Royal Albert Hall, London, UK | A Night at the Royal Albert Hall (2002) | 2:56 | |
| Cathy's Clown | Don Everly | September 22 & 23, 1983, Royal Albert Hall, London, UK | A Night at the Royal Albert Hall (2002) | 2:44 | |
| Gone Gone Gone | Don & Phil Everly | September 22 & 23, 1983, Royal Albert Hall, London, UK | A Night at the Royal Albert Hall (2002) | 3:03 | |
| You Send Me | Sam Cooke | September 22 & 23, 1983, Royal Albert Hall, London, UK | A Night at the Royal Albert Hall (2002) | 4:19 | |
| So Sad (To Watch Good Love Go Bad) | Don Everly | September 22 & 23, 1983, Royal Albert Hall, London, UK | A Night at the Royal Albert Hall (2002) | 3:39 | |
| Blues Stay Away from Me | Alton Delmore / Rabon Delmore / Henry Glover | September 22, 1983, Royal Albert Hall, London, UK | A Night at the Royal Albert Hall (2002) | 5:35 | Played the first night only |
| Bye Bye Love | Boudleaux & Felice Bryant | September 22 & 23, 1983, Royal Albert Hall, London, UK | A Night at the Royal Albert Hall (2002) | 3:08 | |
| All I Have to Do Is Dream | Boudleaux & Felice Bryant | September 22 & 23, 1983, Royal Albert Hall, London, UK | A Night at the Royal Albert Hall (2002) | 3:39 | |
| Wake Up Little Susie | Boudleaux & Felice Bryant | September 22 & 23, 1983, Royal Albert Hall, London, UK | A Night at the Royal Albert Hall (2002) | 2:37 | |
| Till I Kissed You | Don Everly | September 22 & 23, 1983, Royal Albert Hall, London, UK | A Night at the Royal Albert Hall (2002) | 2:58 | |
| Temptation | Nacio Herb Brown / Arthur Freed | September 22 & 23, 1983, Royal Albert Hall, London, UK | A Night at the Royal Albert Hall (2002) | 3:36 | |
| Be-Bop-a-Lula | Tex Davis / Gene Vincent | September 22 & 23, 1983, Royal Albert Hall, London, UK | A Night at the Royal Albert Hall (2002) | 3:25 | |
| Lucille | Al Collins /Little Richard | September 22 & 23, 1983, Royal Albert Hall, London, UK | A Night at the Royal Albert Hall (2002) | 4:41 | |
| Let It Be Me | Gilbert Becaud | September 22 & 23, 1983, Royal Albert Hall, London, UK | A Night at the Royal Albert Hall (2002) | 4:11 | |
| Good Golly Miss Molly | Robert Blackwell / John Marascalco | September 22 & 23, 1983, Royal Albert Hall, London, UK | A Night at the Royal Albert Hall (2002) | 3:45 | |
| Baby What You Want Me to Do | Jimmy Reed | September 23, 1983; Royal Albert Hall, London, UK | A Night at the Royal Albert Hall (2002) | 4:35 | Played the second night only |

== See also ==
- The Everly Brothers
- The Everly Brothers discography
- Felice and Boudleaux Bryant
- Jack Keller
