= Too Good to Be True (The Everly Brothers album) =

Too Good To Be True

Compilation album by The Everly Brothers
- Released: June 14, 2005
- Genre: Rock and roll
- Length: 30:51
- Label: Varese Sarabande
- Producer: Andrew Sandoval, Cary E. Mansfield

The Everly Brothers chronology
Heartaches and Harmonies (1994)	Too Good To Be True (2005)	Give Me a Future (2005)

Professional ratings
Review scores
Source	Rating
Allmusic	4/5 stars
The Encyclopedia of Popular Music	3/5 stars

Too Good To Be True is an album by The Everly Brothers, released in 2005.

== Background ==
Consisting entirely of self-written demonstration recordings recorded between their formative years of 1957 and 1960 (except for the last track, "It's All Over", a solo vocal performance from brother Don in 1976), Too Good To Be True is a bringing together of almost entirely completely unreleased recordings ("Give Me A Future" had already been released in its complete form on the 1992 collection Classic Everly Brothers), the album was the result of a collaboration between Cary Mansfield and Andrew Sandoval, with additional research from Peggy Lamb.

Having originally recorded four songs in November 1955 for Columbia, including a third-take, false-started version of the first song they recorded together, "The Sun Keeps Shining", a cowrite between Don Everly and Jerry Organ (the flip-side of a 45 released in February 1956 on the back of their second-ever recorded song, "Keep A'Lovin' Me"), all of the songs which appear on this album are original recordings. Amongst these songs are original, previously unheard recordings they made when the brothers signed for Acuff-Rose, and demo tracks of latterly released material such as "Should We Tell Him" and the original version of "I Wonder if I Care as Much".

As the decade came to a close and official albums such as Songs Our Daddy Taught Us employed tighter harmony singing and the necessity for better-quality playing, the later tracks display a greater sense of rhythm and timing in the original recordings, including The New Album's solo vocal "Dancing On My Feet", present as a previously recorded demo on this album.

== Track listing ==
All songs by Don Everly unless otherwise noted.

1. "That's Too Good To Be True" – 1:56
2. "I Wonder If I Care As Much" – 2:13
3. "How Did We Stay Together" – 1:12
4. "Maybe Tomorrow" – 1:36
5. "I Didn't Mean To Go This Far" – 1:20
6. "Should We Tell Him" – 1:45
7. "It's Too Late To Say Goodbye" – 1:32
8. "Since You Broke My Heart" – 2:09
9. "All I Ask Of Life" – 1:38
10. "Give Me A Future" – 1:59
11. "I'll Throw Myself At You" – 1:21
12. "Made To Love" (Phil Everly) – 1:51
13. "Life Ain't Worth Living" – 1:16
14. "Kiss Me Once" – 1:24
15. "Dancing On My Feet" (Phil Everly) – 1:59
16. "Do You Love Me" – 1:54
17. "When Will I Be Loved?" (Phil Everly) – 1:39
18. "It's All Over" – 2:09
- Tracks 12, 15 and 17 are vocal solos from Phil Everly.
- Tracks 14 and 16 are vocal solos from Don Everly.

== Personnel ==
- Don Everly – vocals, guitar
- Phil Everly – vocals, guitar

Production notes

- Dan Hersch – digital remastering
- John Hosum – photo courtesy
- Pete Howard – photography
- Jurgen Koop – cover photo
- Cary E. Mansfield – producer
- Bill Pitzonka – art direction, design
- Andrew Sandoval – producer, liner notes, photo courtesy
