= Some Hearts (disambiguation) =

Some Hearts is the 2005 debut album by Carrie Underwood.

Some Hearts may also refer to:

- Some Hearts (The Everly Brothers album), 1988
- "Some Hearts" (song), a 1989 song written by Diane Warren, recorded by Marshall Crenshaw and Carrie Underwood
- "Some Hearts", a 1988 song by The Everly Brothers from their album Some Hearts
- "Some Hearts", a 2015 single by David James
