= The Everly Brothers' Best =

Greatest hits album by The Everly Brothers
- Released: March 1959
- Recorded: March 1, 1957– October 13, 1958
- Label: Cadence
- Producer: Archie Bleyer

The Everly Brothers chronology
| Songs Our Daddy Taught Us (1958) | The Everly Brothers' Best (1959) | It's Everly Time (1960) |

Professional ratings
Review scores
| Source | Rating |
|---|---|
| Allmusic | link |

The Everly Brothers' Best is the first compilation album by American singing duo the Everly Brothers, released in 1959 by their first record company, Cadence Records. The album contains both sides of their first six singles for the label in chronological order. Allmusic states in their review: "this original Cadence compilation still holds up nicely after almost half-a-century."

== Track listing ==
=== Side 1 ===
1. "Bye Bye Love" (Felice Bryant, Boudleaux Bryant) – 2:26
2. "I Wonder If I Care as Much" (Don Everly) – 2:17
3. "Wake Up Little Susie" (F. Bryant, B. Bryant) – 2:06
4. "Maybe Tomorrow" (Everly) – 2:09
5. "Should We Tell Him" (Everly) – 2:07
6. "This Little Girl of Mine" (Ray Charles) – 2:17

=== Side 2 ===
1. "All I Have to Do is Dream" (Boudleaux Bryant) – 2:21
2. "Claudette" (Roy Orbison) – 2:13
3. "Bird Dog" (B. Bryant) – 2:17
4. "Devoted to You" (F. Bryant, B. Bryant) – 2:25
5. "Problems" (F. Bryant, B. Bryant) – 1:59
6. "Love of My Life" (F. Bryant, B. Bryant) – 2:07

Produced by Archie Bleyer

== Personnel ==
- Don Everly – guitar, vocals
- Phil Everly – guitar, vocals
- Chet Atkins – guitar
- Jerry Allison – guitar, drums
- Victor Battista – bass
- Luther Brandon – piano
- Floyd Cramer – piano
- Floyd Chance – double bass on “Bye Bye Love”, Wake Up Little Susie”, “All I Have To Do Is Dream”, and “Bird Dog”
- Jerry Byrd – steel guitar
- Howard Collins – guitar
- Ray Edenton – guitar
- Lloyd Trotman – bass
- Henry Rowland – piano
- Sonny Curtis – guitar
- Barry Galbraith – guitar
- Hank Garland – guitar
- Marvin Hughes – piano
- Buddy Harman – drums
- Mundell Lowe – guitar
