= The Everly Brothers Sing Great Country Hits =

Studio album by The Everly Brothers
- Released: October 1963
- Recorded: June 20 & 21, 1963, Nashville, TN
- Length: 29:35
- Label: Warner Bros.

The Everly Brothers chronology
Christmas with the Everly Brothers and the Boys Town Choir (1962)	The Everly Brothers Sing Great Country Hits (1963)	Gone Gone Gone (1964)

The Everly Brothers Sing Great Country Hits is an album by the Everly Brothers, originally released in 1963. It was re-released on CD in 2005 on the Collectors' Choice Music label.

== Reception ==
Professional ratings
Review scores
Source	Rating
AllMusic	3.5/5 stars
The Encyclopedia of Popular Music	3/5 stars

AllMusic stated in their review: "The singing is some of the most beautiful in the Everlys' output, and the arrangements are models of creative simplicity — and for fans of the duo, it's almost as essential a record as Roots."

== Track listing ==
Side one

1. "Oh Lonesome Me" (Don Gibson) – 2:17
2. "Born to Lose" (Frankie Brown, Ted Daffan) – 2:24
3. "Just One Time" (Don Gibson) – 2:19
4. "Send Me the Pillow That You Dream On" (Hank Locklin) – 2:32
5. "Release Me" (Eddie Miller, Dub Williams, Robert Yount) – 2:21
6. "Please Help Me, I'm Falling" (Hal Blair, Don Robertson) – 2:24

Side two

7. "I Walk the Line" (Johnny Cash) – 2:40
8. "Lonely Street" (Carl Belew, Kenny Sowder, W.S. Stevenson) – 2:22
9. "Silver Threads and Golden Needles" (Dick Reynolds, Jack Rhodes) – 2:16
10. "I'm So Lonesome I Could Cry" (Hank Williams) – 2:57
11. "Sweet Dreams" (Don Gibson) – 2:48
12. "This Is the Last Song I'm Ever Going to Sing" (Jerry Allison, Sonny Curtis) – 2:15

== Personnel ==
- Don Everly – guitar, vocals
- Phil Everly – guitar, vocals
- Glen Campbell – guitar
- Sonny Curtis – guitar
- Billy Strange – guitar
- Red Rhodes – steel guitar
- Bert Dodson – bass
- Hal Blaine – drums
- Leon Russell – piano
