= Gone Gone Gone (album) =

Studio album by The Everly Brothers
- Released: December 1964
- Recorded: July 13, 1960 – September 8, 1964
- Length: 26:17
- Label: Warner Bros.

The Everly Brothers chronology
The Everly Brothers Sing Great Country Hits (1963)	Gone Gone Gone (1964)	Rock'n Soul (1965)

Gone Gone Gone is an album by the Everly Brothers, originally released in 1964. It was re-released on CD in 2005 on the Collectors' Choice Music label.

Three of the tracks ("Radio and TV", "Lonely Island" and "Donna, Donna") date back to 1960 recording sessions, and "Donna, Donna" had already been issued on a previous Everly Brothers album (A Date with the Everly Brothers). The remainder, including the title hit, were all recorded at various sessions from January to September 1964. It was the first Everly Brothers album in four years — since 1960's A Date with the Everly Brothers — to include songs written by Felice and Boudleaux Bryant, which had become unavailable after the Everlys parted with manager Wesley Rose.

The title track was covered by Robert Plant and Alison Krauss on their 2007 collaboration album Raising Sand.

== Reception ==
Professional ratings
Review scores
Source	Rating
Allmusic	2/5 stars
The Encyclopedia of Popular Music	4/5 stars
Record Mirror	4/5 stars

Writing for Allmusic, music critic Richie Unterberger wrote of the album "A jumble of tracks from varying sessions that, despite some excellent moments, were indicative of the general directionlessness of the Everlys' career at this point."

== Track listing ==
Side one

1. "Donna, Donna" (Felice Bryant, Boudleaux Bryant) – 2:16
2. "Lonely Island" (Boudleaux Bryant) – 2:15
3. "The Facts of Life" (Don Everly) – 2:07
4. "Ain't That Lovin' You Baby" (Jimmy Reed) – 2:05
5. "Love Is All I Need" (Bryant, Bryant) – 1:55
6. "Torture" (John D. Loudermilk) – 2:24

Side two

7. "The Drop Out" (Don Everly) – 2:18
8. "Radio and TV" (Bryant, Bryant) – 2:14
9. "Honolulu" (Bryant) – 1:51
10. "It's Been a Long Dry Spell" (Loudermilk) – 2:30
11. "The Ferris Wheel" (Robert Blackwell, DeWayne Blackwell) – 2:19
12. "Gone, Gone, Gone" (Don Everly, Phil Everly) – 2:03

== Personnel ==
- Don Everly – guitar, vocals
- Phil Everly – guitar, vocals
