= The Everly Brothers Show =

Live album by The Everly Brothers
- Released: July 1970
- Recorded: February 6, 1970
- Venue: Grand Hotel in Anaheim, CA
- Length: 67:08
- Label: Warner Bros.

The Everly Brothers chronology
Roots (1968)	The Everly Brothers Show (1970)	Stories We Could Tell (1972)

Professional ratings
Review scores
Source	Rating
Allmusic	2.5/5 stars
The Encyclopedia of Popular Music	3/5 stars

The Everly Brothers Show is a live album by the Everly Brothers, released in 1970.

The Everly Brothers Show was a one-hour musical variety show on the ABC television network. It began as a summer replacement in 1970 for The Johnny Cash Show. Warner Bros. Records released a double LP at the same time, but the album was not a soundtrack to the TV series.

It was re-issued on CD set by Collector's Choice Records in 2005.

== Track listing ==
1. Introduction – 1:31
2. "Mama Tried" (Merle Haggard) – 2:03
3. "Kentucky" (Karl Davis) – 2:43
4. "Bowling Green" (Jacqueline Ertel, Terry Slater) – 2:34
5. "(Till) I Kissed You" (Don Everly) – 1:56
6. "Wake Up Little Susie" (Felice Bryant, Boudleaux Bryant) – 1:42
7. "Cathy's Clown" (Don Everly) – 1:23
8. "Bird Dog" (Boudleaux Bryant) – 1:57
9. "Maybellene" (Chuck Berry, Russ Fratto, Alan Freed) – 2:16
10. Medley – 18:39
  1. "Rock and Roll Music" (Berry)
  2. "The End" (John Lennon, Paul McCartney)
  3. "Aquarius" (James Rado, Gerome Ragni, Galt MacDermot)
  4. "If I Were a Carpenter" (Tim Hardin)
  5. "The Price of Love" (Everly, Everly)
  6. "The Thrill Is Gone" (Arthur H. Benson, Dale Pettite)
  7. "Games People Play" (Joe South)
11. "Baby What You Want Me to Do" (Jimmy Reed) – 4:52
12. "All I Have to Do Is Dream" (Boudleaux Bryant) – 3:11
13. "Walk Right Back" (Sonny Curtis) – 2:09
14. "Susie Q/Hey Jude" (Eleanor Broadwater, Dale Hawkins, Stan Lewis; Lennon, McCartney) – 5:23
15. "Lord of the Manor" (Terry Slater) – 4:12
16. "I Wonder If I Care as Much" (Everly, Everly) – 3:11
17. "Love Is Strange" ("Ethel Smith") – 3:59
18. "Let It Be Me/Give Peace a Chance" (Gilbert Bécaud, Mann Curtis; Lennon, McCartney) – 4:10

== Personnel ==
=== Performance ===
- Don Everly – guitar, vocals
- Phil Everly – guitar, vocals
- Robert Knigge – bass
- Sam McCue – guitar
- Tiny Schneider – drums

=== Production ===
- Bill Inglot – mastering
- Jim Marshall – cover photo
- Andrew Sandoval – mastering
- Dave Schultz – mastering
- Ed Thrasher – art direction, photography
- Richie Unterberger – liner notes
