= New Album (disambiguation) =

New Album is a 2011 album by Boris.

New Album may also refer to:

- The New Album, an album by the Everly Brothers, 1977
- The New Album, an album by Blackstratblues, 2009
- Lena: A New Album, an album by Lena Horne, 1976
- Tormé: A New Album, an album by Mel Tormé, 1977

== See also ==
- Art release, the premiere of an artistic production
- New (album), by Paul McCartney, 2013
- New (EP), by Regurgitator, 1995
