= It's Everly Time =

Studio album by the Everly Brothers
- Released: May 1960
- Recorded: March 8–24, 1960
- Genre: Rock and roll
- Length: 26:59
- Label: Warner Bros.

The Everly Brothers chronology
The Everly Brothers' Best (1959)	It's Everly Time (1960)	A Date with the Everly Brothers (1960)

Singles from It's Everly Time
- 1. "So Sad (To Watch Good Love Go Bad)" Released: August 1960

It's Everly Time is the third studio album by American singing duo the Everly Brothers, released in 1960. It's Everly Time was their first album on Warner Bros. after leaving the independent label Cadence. Though Warner Brothers was based in Los Angeles, they continued to record in Nashville with top session players, laying down all the dozen tracks over the course of five sessions in March 1960.

== Chart performance ==
The album debuted on Billboard magazine's Best-Selling Monophonic LPs chart in the issue dated May 27, 1960, peaking at No. 9 during a ten-week run on the chart. The album debuted on Cashbox magazine's Best-Selling Monaural Albums chart in the issue dated May 28, 1960, peaking at No. 7 during a seventeen-week run on the chart. On the magazine's Best-Selling 50 Stereo Albums chart it reached No. 31, during a shorter sixteen-week run on it. The album had also almost topped the UK Record Retailer LP charts, peaking at No. 2.

== Reception ==
Professional ratings
Review scores
Source	Rating
AllMusic	4.5/5 stars
The Encyclopedia of Popular Music	3/5 stars

Writing for AllMusic, music critic Richie Unterberger stated, "While the Everlys' sound was diluted by more elaborate production in the '60s, that's not at all true on this LP, which is one of their very best. Not a stiff among the 12 tracks..."

== Track listing ==
All tracks are written by Felice and Boudleaux Bryant, except as noted.

Side one
No.	Title	Writer(s)	Length
1.	"So Sad (To Watch Good Love Go Bad)"	Don Everly	2:33
2.	"Just in Case"	Boudleaux Bryant	2:12
3.	"Memories Are Made of This"	Richard Dehr, Terry Gilkyson, Frank Miller	2:35
4.	"That's What You Do to Me"	Bob Montgomery, Earl Sinks	2:03
5.	"Sleepless Nights"		2:24
6.	"What Kind of Girl Are You"	Ray Charles	1:57

Side two
No.	Title	Writer(s)	Length
7.	"Oh True Love"		2:13
8.	"Carol Jane"	Dave Rich	1:51
9.	"Some Sweet Day"		2:25
10.	"Nashville Blues"		2:39
11.	"You Thrill Me (Through and Through)"		2:05
12.	"I Want You to Know"	Dave Bartholomew, Fats Domino	2:02

== Personnel ==
- Don Everly – guitar, vocals
- Phil Everly – guitar, vocals
- Chet Atkins, "Sugarfoot" Garland – electric guitar
- James Clayton – steel guitar
- Floyd T. "Lightnin'" Chance – bass
- Floyd Cramer or Marvin H. Hughes – piano
- "Buddy" Harman Jr. – drums

== Charts ==
Chart (1960)	Peak position
UK Record Retailer Top LPs	2
US Billboard Best-Selling Monophonic LPs	9
US Cashbox Best-Selling Monaural Albums	7
US Cashbox Best-Selling Stereo Albums	31
