= The Everly Brothers Sing =

Studio album by The Everly Brothers
- Released: July 1967
- Recorded: November 12, 1965 – June 22, 1967
- Genres: Rock; R&B
- Label: Warner Bros.
- Producer: Dick Glasser

The Everly Brothers chronology
The Hit Sound of the Everly Brothers (1967)	The Everly Brothers Sing (1967)	Roots (1968)

Professional ratings
Review scores
Source	Rating
AllMusic	3/5 stars
The Encyclopedia of Popular Music	3/5 stars

The Everly Brothers Sing is an album by the Everly Brothers, released by Warner Bros. in 1967. It was re-released on CD by Collectors' Choice Music in 2005.

The album includes their last Top 40 hit, "Bowling Green." It was also their last Top 100 hit until 1984.

== Critical reception ==
Billboard praised the album, singling out "Bowling Green" and the duo's cover of "A Whiter Shade of Pale."

== Track listing ==
=== Side One ===
1. "Bowling Green" (Terry Slater, Jacqueline Ertel) – 2:50
2. "A Voice Within" (Terry Slater) – 2:23
3. "I Don't Want to Love You" (Don Everly, Phil Everly) – 2:48
4. "It's All Over" (Don Everly) – 2:23
5. "Deliver Me" (Daniel Moore) – 2:35
6. "Talking to the Flowers" (Terry Slater) – 2:57

=== Side two ===
1. "Mary Jane" (Terry Slater) – 3:01
2. "I'm Finding It Rough" (Patrick Campbell-Lyons, Chris Thomas) – 2:47
3. "Do You" (Terry Slater) – 2:47
4. "Somebody Help Me" (Jackie Edwards) – 2:01
5. "A Whiter Shade of Pale" (Gary Brooker, Keith Reid) – 4:55
6. "Mercy, Mercy, Mercy" (Joe Zawinul) – 2:28

== Personnel ==
- Guitar: James Burton, Glen Campbell, Al Capps,
  Al Casey, Don Everly, Phil Everly, Jay Lacy
- Bass: Chuck Berghofer, Terry Slater
- Keyboards: Don Randi
- Drums: Jim Gordon, Hal Blaine, Jonathan Sargent
- Saxophone: Jules Jacob, Jay Migliori
