= The Hit Sound of the Everly Brothers =

Studio album by The Everly Brothers
- Released: February 1967
- Recorded: November 8, 1966 – January 5, 1967
- Label: Warner Bros.
- Producer: Dick Glasser

The Everly Brothers chronology
Two Yanks in England (1966)	The Hit Sound of the Everly Brothers (1967)	The Everly Brothers Sing (1967)

Professional ratings
Review scores
Source	Rating
Allmusic	2/5 stars
The Encyclopedia of Popular Music	3/5 stars

The Hit Sound of the Everly Brothers is an album by the Everly Brothers, released in 1967. It was re-released on CD by Collectors' Choice Music in 2005.

== Sessions ==
The album was recorded in sessions in December 1966 and January 1967 and released in March 1967. Among the musicians were several Wrecking Crew members, Glen Campbell, Larry Knechtel, Ray Pohlman, Jim Gordon and Hal Blaine.

== Track listing ==
=== Side 1 ===
1. "Blueberry Hill" (Al Lewis, Vincent Rose, Larry Stock) – 3:02
2. "I'm Movin' On" (Hank Snow) – 2:28
3. "Devil's Child" (Irwin Levine, Neil Sheppard) – 2:40
4. "Trains and Boats and Planes" (Burt Bacharach, Hal David) – 3:03
5. "Sea of Heartbreak" (Hal David, Paul Hampton) – 2:22
6. "Oh, Boy!" (Norman Petty, Bill Tilghman, Sonny West) – 2:47

=== Side two ===
1. "(I'd Be) A Legend in My Time" (Don Gibson) – 2:47
2. "Let's Go Get Stoned" (Josephine Armstead, Nickolas Ashford, Valerie Simpson) – 3:07
3. "Sticks and Stones" (Henry Glover, Titus Turner) – 2:48
4. "The House of the Rising Sun" (Terry Holmes, Alan Price, Nicholas Ray, Josh White) – 4:36
5. "She Never Smiles Anymore" (Jimmy Webb) – 3:19
6. "Good Golly Miss Molly" (Robert Blackwell, John Marascalco) – 2:49

== Personnel ==
Technical

- Eddie Brackett, Lee Herschberg - engineer
- Ed Thrasher - art direction, photography
