= Instant Party! =

Studio album by the Everly Brothers
- Released: January 1962
- Recorded: August 29 – November 13, 1961
- Genre: Pop
- Length: 28:24
- Label: Warner Bros.

The Everly Brothers chronology
| Both Sides of an Evening (1961) | Instant Party! (1962) | Christmas with the Everly Brothers and the Boys Town Choir (1962) |

Professional ratings
Review scores
| Source | Rating |
|---|---|
| Allmusic | 2/5 stars |

Instant Party! is an album by the Everly Brothers, originally released in 1962. It was recorded in Nashville between August and November 1961, shortly after Both Sides of an Evening and it too failed to chart. There is an exclamation point on the cover art but not in the title as shown on the original label.

== Critical reception ==
The album consisted mainly of older pop tunes, making this release notable in its lack of the duo's normal rock and roll. Allmusic stated in its review, "...much of the playing was impeccable, but also, apart from three exceptions, incredibly boring, something the Everlys had never been before. Instant Party! marked a low point in their artistic fortunes..."

== Track listing ==
Side one

1. "Step It Up and Go" (Traditional; credited to Don Everly, Phil Everly under the pseudonym Jimmy Howard) - 1:58
2. "Theme From Carnival (Love Makes the World Go 'Round)" (Bob Merrill) - 2:40
3. "Jezebel" (Wayne Shanklin) - 2:20
4. "True Love" (Cole Porter) - 1:59
5. "Bye Bye Blackbird" (Mort Dixon, Ray Henderson) - 3:15
6. "When It's Night-Time in Italy It's Wednesday Over Here" (Lew Brown, James Kendis) - 2:00

Side two

7. "Oh! My Pa-Pa (O Mein Papa)" (Paul Burkhard, Geoffrey Parsons, John Turner) - 2:08
8. "Trouble in Mind" (Richard M. Jones) - 2:30
9. "Autumn Leaves" (Joseph Kosma, Johnny Mercer, Jacques Prévert) - 2:50
10. "Long Lost John" (Adapted by Ike Everly) - 1:49
11. "The Party's Over" (Betty Comden, Adolph Green, Jules Styne) - 2:14
12. "Ground Hawg" (Adapted by Ike Everly) - 2:02

== Personnel ==
- Don Everly – guitar, vocals
- Phil Everly – guitar, vocals
- Chet Atkins – electric guitar
- Hank Garland – electric guitar
- Luther Brandon – acoustic guitar
- Floyd Chance – bass
- Floyd Cramer – piano
- Buddy Harman, Jr. – drums

Technical

- Ken Whitmore - cover photography
