= Rock'n Soul (Everly Brothers album) =

Studio album by The Everly Brothers
- Released: March 1965
- Recorded: November 13, 1961 (track 11); December 1–3, 1964
- Length: 24:09
- Label: Warner Bros.
- Producer: Dick Glasser

The Everly Brothers chronology
Gone Gone Gone (1964)	Rock'n Soul (1965)	Beat & Soul (1965)

Rock'n Soul is an album by the Everly Brothers, originally released in 1965. It was re-released on CD in 2005 on the Collectors' Choice Music label.

The version of "Love Hurts" included here is a different version than the one that they recorded previously.

== Reception ==
Professional ratings
Review scores
Source	Rating
Allmusic	2/5 stars
The Encyclopedia of Popular Music	3/5 stars
Record Mirror	4/5 stars

Writing for Allmusic, music critic Richie Unterberger wrote of the album "It's decently played and sung, but not among the Everlys' most creative work, or even among their most interesting material of the mid-'60s."

== Track listing ==
=== Side one ===
1. "That'll Be the Day" (Jerry Allison, Buddy Holly, Norman Petty) – 2:22
2. "So Fine" (Johnny Otis) – 1:59
3. "Maybellene" (Chuck Berry, Russ Fratto, Alan Freed) – 1:52
4. "Dancing in the Street" (Marvin Gaye, Ivy Jo Hunter, William "Mickey" Stevenson) – 2:37
5. "Kansas City" (Jerry Leiber, Mike Stoller, Richard Penniman) – 2:25
6. "I Got a Woman" (Ray Charles) – 2:10

=== Side two ===
1. "Love Hurts" (Boudleaux Bryant) – 1:59
2. "Slippin' and Slidin'" (Edwin Bocage, James Smith, Albert Collins, Richard Penniman) – 1:57
3. "Susie Q" (Eleanor Broadwater, Dale Hawkins, Stanley Lewis) – 1:58
4. "Hound Dog" (Jerry Leiber, Mike Stoller) – 1:57
5. "I'm Gonna Move to the Outskirts of Town" (Roy Jacobs, Andy Razaf, William Weldon) – 2:54
6. "Lonely Weekends" (Charlie Rich) – 1:59
