= EB 84 =

Studio album by the Everly Brothers
- Released: September 1984
- Recorded: May 1984
- Studio: Maison Rouge, London
- Genre: Country, pop
- Label: Mercury
- Producer: Dave Edmunds

The Everly Brothers chronology
The New Album (1977)	EB 84 (1984)	All They Had to Do Was Dream (1985)

Professional ratings
Review scores
Source	Rating
AllMusic	3.5/5 stars
Robert Christgau	C+
The Encyclopedia of Popular Music	3/5 stars

EB 84 is a 1984 album by the Everly Brothers, and the duo's first album of new material in 11 years since their last album, Pass the Chicken & Listen.

== Track listing ==
1. "On the Wings of a Nightingale" (Paul McCartney) - 2:33 (US #50, UK #41)
2. "Danger Danger" (Frankie Miller) - 3:26
3. "The Story of Me" (Jeff Lynne) - 4:11
4. "I'm Takin' My Time" (Rick Beresford, Pat Alger) - 2:46
5. "The First in Line" (Paul Kennerley) - 2:57
6. "Lay Lady Lay" (Bob Dylan) - 3:14
7. "Following the Sun" (Don Everly) - 3:31
8. "You Make It Seem So Easy" (Don Everly) - 3:12
9. "More Than I Can Handle" (Pete Wingfield, Mike Vernon) - 2:58
10. "Asleep" (Don Everly) - 4:10

== Personnel ==
- Don Everly – vocals, acoustic guitar
- Phil Everly – vocals, acoustic guitar
- Dave Edmunds – producer, additional bass, additional guitar on "On the Wings of a Nightingale"
- Albert Lee – guitar
- Jeff Lynne – bass, arrangements
- Paul McCartney – additional guitar on "On the Wings of a Nightingale"
- Gerry Conway – drums
- Philip Donnelly – guitar
- John Giblin – bass
- Gerry Hogan – pedal steel
- Richard Tandy – arranger, additional keyboards
- Terry Williams – drums
- Pete Wingfield – keyboards

Technical

- Carey Taylor - engineer
- Ed Caraeff - photography, design

== Charts ==
Chart (1984)	Peak position
U.S. Billboard 200	44
U.S. Billboard Top Country Albums	24
Canadian RPM Top Albums	90
Dutch Top 40	2
Swedish Topplistan	42

== Sales and certifications ==
Certifications for EB 84
Region	Certification	Certified units/sales
Netherlands (NVPI)	Gold	50,000^{^}
^{^} Shipments figures based on certification alone.
