= Both Sides of an Evening =

Studio album by The Everly Brothers
- Released: August 1961
- Recorded: May 30 – June 1, 1961
- Genre: Rock and roll
- Length: 32:39
- Label: Warner Bros.
- Producer: Andrew Sandoval

The Everly Brothers chronology
A Date with the Everly Brothers (1960)	Both Sides of an Evening (1961)	Instant Party! (1962)

Both Sides Of An Evening is the fifth studio album and released in 1961 by The Everly Brothers. Though it was released at the peak of their career, it failed to make any of the record charts.

Fourteen songs were laid down for the album, in two halves (the first seven, for side A, were marked "For dancing", and the second seven, for side B, marked "For dreaming"). The completed album was recorded in only three days worth of sessions. It was produced by Bill Porter.

Prior to the album's release, half-minute excerpts of the songs were released on a Souvenir sampler, purchasable for a single dollar.

== Reception ==
Professional ratings
Review scores
Source	Rating
Allmusic	3/5 stars
The Encyclopedia of Popular Music	3/5 stars

Writing for Allmusic, music critic Bruce Eder wrote of the album "...the duo's most ambitious and mature record to date, but it just wasn't terribly exciting or of much interest (especially the second side) to the teenagers that made up the vast bulk of their audience."

== Track listing ==
Side one (For Dancing)

1. "My Mammy" (Walter Donaldson, Joe Young, Sam M. Lewis) – 2:15
2. "Muskrat" (Merle Travis, Tex Ann, Harold Hensley) – 2:18
3. "My Gal Sal" (Paul Dressor) – 2:50
4. "Grandfather's Clock" (Henry Clay Work) – 2:22
5. "Bully of the Town" (Adapted by Ike Everly) – 2:01
6. "Chlo-e" (Neil Moret, Gus Kahn) – 2:05
7. "Mention My Name in Sheboygan" (Bob Hilliard, Dick Sanford, Samuel Mysels) – 1:51

Side two (For Dreaming)

8. "Hi-Lili, Hi-Lo" (Tim Kapper, Helen Deutsch) – 1:44
9. "The Wayward Wind" (Herb Newman, Stanley Lebowsky) – 2:26
10. "Don't Blame Me" (Jimmy McHugh, Dorothy Fields) – 3:26
11. "Now Is the Hour" (Traditional) – 2:39
12. "Little Old Lady" (Hoagy Carmichael, Stanley Adams) – 2:24
13. "When I Grow Too Old to Dream" (Sigmund Romberg, Oscar Hammerstein II) – 2:30
14. "Love Is Where You Find It" (Nacio Herb Brown, Earl Brent) – 1:48

== Personnel ==
- Don Everly – guitar, vocals
- Phil Everly – guitar, vocals
- Chet Atkins – guitar
- Harold Bradley – guitar
- Hank Garland – guitar
- Ray Edenton – guitar
- Sammy Pruett – guitar
- Walter Haynes – steel guitar
- Lightnin' Chance – bass
- Marvin Hughes – piano
- Buddy Harman – drums
- Lou Busch – percussion, tambourine, cowbell

Production notes

- Andrew Sandoval – producer
- Bill Inglot – mastering
- Dan Hersch – mastering
- Bill Porter – engineer
- Andrew Sandoval – mastering
- Richie Unterberger – liner notes
- Teresa Woodward – cover painting
