= Beat & Soul =

Studio album by The Everly Brothers
- Released: August 1965
- Recorded: June 7–9, 1965
- Genre: Rock and roll
- Length: 31:02
- Label: Warner Bros.
- Producer: Dick Glasser

The Everly Brothers chronology
Rock'n Soul (1965)	Beat & Soul (1965)	In Our Image (1966)

Beat & Soul is an album by The Everly Brothers, originally released in 1965. It was re-released on CD in 2005 on the Collectors' Choice Music label.

== Reception ==
Professional ratings
Review scores
Source	Rating
Allmusic	3/5 stars
The Encyclopedia of Popular Music	3/5 stars
Record Mirror	4/5 stars

Writing for AllMusic, music critic Richie Unterberger wrote of the album "While the performances are pretty good—and the vocals perennially better than good—it also seemed to be an indication that the pair were unwilling or unable to write or procure a decent supply of new material. Because of the overfamiliarity of most of the songs, it has to rate as one of the brothers' less interesting efforts, regardless of the high level of execution."

== Chart performance ==
The album debuted on Billboard magazine's Top LP's chart in the issue dated September 25, 1965, peaking at No. 141 during a three-week run on the chart.

== Track listing ==
Side one

1. "Love Is Strange" (Mickey Baker, Sylvia Robinson, Ellas McDaniel) – 2:53
2. "Money" (Janie Bradford, Berry Gordy) – 2:32
3. "What Am I Living For?" (Art Harris, Fred Jay) – 3:05
4. "Hi-Heel Sneakers" (Robert Higginbotham) – 3:16
5. "C.C. Rider" (Gertrude "Ma" Rainey) – 2:12
6. "Lonely Avenue" (Doc Pomus) – 2:34

Side two

7. "Man with Money" (Don Everly, Phil Everly) – 2:20
8. "People Get Ready" (Curtis Mayfield) – 2:05
9. "My Babe" (Willie Dixon) – 2:40
10. "Walking the Dog" (Rufus Thomas) – 2:39
11. "I Almost Lost My Mind" (Ivory Joe Hunter) – 2:37
12. "The Girl Can't Help It" (Bobby Troup) – 2:09

== Personnel ==
- Don Everly – vocals, guitar
- Phil Everly – vocals guitar
- James Burton – guitar
- Glen Campbell – guitar
- Sonny Curtis – guitar
- Larry Knechtel – bass
- Jim Gordon – drums
- Leon Russell – piano
- Billy Preston – piano

== Charts ==
Chart (1965)	Peak position
US Billboard Top LPs	141
