= Roots (The Everly Brothers album) =

Studio album by The Everly Brothers
- Released: December 1968
- Recorded: April 10–October 7, 1968
- Genre: Country rock
- Length: 35:57
- Label: Warner Bros.
- Producer: Lenny Waronker

The Everly Brothers chronology
The Everly Brothers Sing (1967)	Roots (1968)	The Everly Brothers Show (1970)

Roots is a 1968 studio album by American singing duo the Everly Brothers. Originally on the Warner Bros. label, the album was re-released on CD in 1995 by Warner Bros. and in 2005 by Collectors' Choice Music. The album is a classic example of early country rock.

== Critical reception ==
Professional ratings
Review scores
Source	Rating
AllMusic	4.5/5 stars
The Encyclopedia of Popular Music	4/5 stars
Rolling Stone	(Favorable)

On its release, Roots was not a commercial success for the Everly Brothers, failing to widen their fanbase in spite of their excursion into the new field of country rock. At the time of its release, Rolling Stone, which awarded the album 4 stars in its coverage of the band in The New Rolling Stone Album Guide, described the album as "a showcase for the superb talent of the Everlys as they are today", asserting that anyone "interested in the so-called country revival now sweeping rock should pick up this album". In his reviews of the bands subsequent albums, critic Robert Christgau often utilized Roots as a touchstone, referring to it as "sweet", "thoughtful, even-tempered, and unique". Today, the album is touted as "one of the finest early country-rock albums".

== Track listing ==
Side 1

1. "The Introduction: The Everly Family (1952)" – 1:11
2. "Mama Tried" (Merle Haggard) – 2:18
3. "Less of Me" (Glen Campbell) – 3:03
4. "T for Texas" (Jimmie Rodgers) – 3:31
5. "I Wonder If I Care as Much" (Don Everly, Phil Everly) – 2:59
6. "Ventura Boulevard" (Ron Elliott) – 2:50
7. "Shady Grove" (P. O. Wandz; credit also given to Jacquie Ertel (Phil's wife) and Venetia Everly (Don's wife)) – 2:31

Side 2

8. "Illinois" (Randy Newman) – 2:12
9. "Living Too Close to the Ground" (Terry Slater) – 2:16
10. "You Done Me Wrong" (George Jones, Ray Price) – 2:16
11. "Turn Around" (Ron Elliott) – 2:47
12. "Sing Me Back Home" (Merle Haggard) – 5:18
13. "Montage: The Everly Family (1952)/Shady Grove/Kentucky" (Terry Slater, Karl Davis) – 2:43

== Personnel ==
=== Performance ===
- Don Everly – guitar, vocals
- Phil Everly – guitar, vocals

=== Production ===
- Frank Bez – photography, cover photo
- Perry Botkin, Jr. – arranger
- Nick DeCaro – string arrangements
- Ron Elliott – arranger
- Lee Herschberg – engineer, mastering
- Bill Inglot –reissue re- mastering
- John Neil – engineer
- Andrew Sandoval – re-issue re- mastering
- Dave Schultz – mastering
- Mike Shields – engineer
- Ed Thrasher – art direction
- Richie Unterberger – liner notes
- Lenny Waronker – producer, concept
- Andrew Wickham – liner notes, concept
