= The Everly Brothers (album) =

Studio album by the Everly Brothers
- Released: January 1958
- Recorded: March 1 – November 3, 1957
- Studios: RCA Victor, Nashville
- Length: 26:58
- Label: Cadence
- Producer: Archie Bleyer

The Everly Brothers chronology
The Everly Brothers (1958)	Songs Our Daddy Taught Us (1958)

Singles from The Everly Brothers
- 1. "Bye Bye Love" / "I Wonder If I Care as Much" Released: March 1957; 2. "Wake Up Little Susie" / "Maybe Tomorrow" Released: September 2, 1957; 3. "This Little Girl of Mine" / "Should We Tell Him" Released: January 20, 1958

The Everly Brothers is the 1958 eponymous debut album of close harmony singing duo the Everly Brothers. The album peaked at No. 16 on Billboard's pop albums chart and launched three very successful singles. Originally on the Cadence label, (CLP-3003), the album was re-released on LP in 1988 by EMI and on CD in 2000 by Emporio Records. It was re-released again in 2009 on 180-gram vinyl by Doxy music.

It is sometimes called They're Off and Rolling or They're Off and Rolling, Says Archie which is the introduction on the front of the album. Archie Bleyer was the producer.

== Chart performance ==
The album debuted on Billboard magazine's Best-Selling Pop LP's chart in the issue dated February 1, 1958, peaking at No. 16 during a three-week run on the chart. The album debuted on Cashbox magazine's Best-Selling Pop Albums chart in the issue dated January 18, 1958, peaking at a higher No. 6 during an eleven-week run on the chart.

=== Hit singles ===
"Bye Bye Love" and "Wake Up Little Susie" enjoyed crossover success. "Bye Bye Love" peaked at No. 1 on the Hot Country Songs chart, No. 2 on the Pop Singles chart and No. 5 on the R&B chart. "Wake Up Little Susie" reached No. 1 on all three.

Two of the songs on this album are included in Rolling Stone's "500 Greatest Songs of All Time". "Bye Bye Love", No. 207 on the list, had been rejected by thirty musicians before the Everly Brothers agreed to record and release it, whereupon it remained on the charts for 27 weeks. "Wake Up Little Susie", song No. 311, was controversial enough as to be banned in Boston with its story of a teen couple who fall asleep during a boring film and wake far past curfew.

== Legacy ==
In a retrospective review for Allmusic, Richie Unterberger writes of the album "Although the Everlys hadn't quite fully matured as artists, their debut is a fine, consistent effort divided between original material and respectably energetic covers of early rockers by Little Richard, Gene Vincent, and Ray Charles."

== Track listing ==
1. "This Little Girl of Mine" (Ray Charles) – 2:18
2. "Maybe Tomorrow" (Don Everly) – 2:07
3. "Bye Bye Love" (Felice Bryant, Boudleaux Bryant) – 2:20
4. "Brand New Heartache" (F. Bryant, B. Bryant) – 2:17
5. "Keep a Knockin'" (Richard Penniman) – 2:18
6. "Be-Bop-A-Lula" (Gene Vincent, Donald Graves, Bill "Tex Sheriff" Davis) – 2:19
7. "Rip It Up" (Robert "Bumps" Blackwell, John Marascalco) – 2:16
8. "I Wonder If I Care as Much" (D. Everly) – 2:14
9. "Wake Up Little Susie" (F. Bryant, B. Bryant) – 2:01
10. "Leave My Woman Alone" (Charles) – 2:36
11. "Should We Tell Him" (D. Everly, P. Everly) – 2:06
12. "Hey Doll Baby" (Traditional, Titus Turner) – 2:06

== Personnel ==
- Don Everly – guitar, vocals
- Phil Everly – guitar, vocals
- Archie Bleyer – producer

== Charts ==
Chart (1958)	Peak position
US Billboard Best-Selling Pop LPs	16
US Cashbox Best-Selling Pop Albums	6
