= Give Me a Future =

Compilation album by The Everly Brothers
- Released: September 27, 2005
- Genre: Rock and roll
- Label: Varese Sarabande

The Everly Brothers chronology
Too Good to Be True (2005)	Give Me a Future (2005)	Love Hurts: The Platinum Collection (2005)

Professional ratings
Review scores
Source	Rating
Allmusic	3.5/5 stars

Give Me a Future is an album by The Everly Brothers, released in 2005 and the sequel to the similar release of the same year, Too Good To Be True. Like its predecessor, it contains previously unheard songs recorded by the group in the early stages of their career.

== Track listing ==
1. "Give Me a Future" – 1:41
2. "Maybe Tomorrow" – 1:58
3. "How Did We Stay Together" – 1:16
4. "Since You Broke My Heart" – 1:28
5. "You're the One" – 2:03
6. "Will I Ever Have a Chance Again" – 1:37
7. "Who's to Be the One" – 2:05
8. "Don't Call Me, I'll Call You" – 1:18
9. "Captain, Captain" – 2:11
10. "You Can Fly" – 1:55
11. "Her Love Was Meant for Me" – 2:04
12. "Hello Amy" – 2:57
13. "I'll Bide My Time" – 1:24
14. "Oh What a Feeling" – 1:42
15. "Turned Down" – 1:19
16. "I'm Tired of Singing My Song in Las Vegas" – 2:16
17. "I'm Gonna Make Real Sure" – 1:41
18. "Only Me" – 3:03
