= Two Yanks in England =

Studio album by The Everly Brothers
- Released: July 1966 (US)
- Recorded: 14 May – 3 June 1966
- Studio: Decca, London; United, Hollywood
- Genre: Rock and roll
- Length: 31:11
- Label: Warner Bros.
- Producer: Dick Glasser

The Everly Brothers chronology
In Our Image (1966)	Two Yanks in England (1966)	The Hit Sound of the Everly Brothers (1967)

The Hollies chronology
Would You Believe? (1966)	Two Yanks in England (1966)	For Certain Because (1966)

Professional ratings
Review scores
Source	Rating
Allmusic	4/5 stars
The Encyclopedia of Popular Music	3/5 stars

Two Yanks in England is an album by The Everly Brothers, released in 1966. Despite the album title and packaging, only half the tracks were recorded in England; six of the twelve tracks were recorded in Hollywood.

The backing band on half the recordings are members of The Hollies, augmented by session players. Eight of the twelve songs featured are credited to L. Ransford, the songwriting pseudonym of The Hollies' Allan Clarke, Tony Hicks and Graham Nash. Jimmy Page and John Paul Jones are also purported to play on the record as session musicians. Also, in an interview with Nash on David Dye's World Cafe, it was claimed Reggie Dwight (a.k.a. Elton John) played on the album. Nash repeated the assertion on Desert Island Discs on 12 January 2024, but his assertion is not supported by session logs, or by any other source (including any other member of The Hollies, or Elton John himself).

Two singles were released from the album in the US; "Somebody Help Me" b/w "Hard Hard Year" in late 1966 and "Fifi the Flea" b/w "Like Every Time Before" in early 1967. Both singles failed to chart. The second single credited the artist as "Don Everly Brother" on side A, and "Phil Everly Brother" on side B, as Don sang "Fifi The Flea" almost entirely as a solo artist (aside from an extremely brief wordless harmony bit by Phil that lasted under five seconds), whereas Phil sang "Like Every Time Before" completely solo with no vocal harmony at all from Don. These were the first 'solo' recordings in either Phil or Don's career.

In the UK, where "Somebody Help Me" had already been a No.1 hit for The Spencer Davis Group shortly before The Everly Brothers recorded it, just one single was released from the album: "I've Been Wrong Before" b/w "Hard Hard Year" (August 1966). This also failed to chart. "I've Been Wrong Before" should not be confused with the Randy Newman song of the same title recorded by both Dusty Springfield and Cilla Black the previous year, which Black had a modest hit with in the UK (No.17, May 1965).

The last track on Side One of Two Yanks in England, "Pretty Flamingo", was a UK No.1 hit single for Manfred Mann at the time the recording of the album began (May 1966).

== Track listing ==
All tracks composed by L. Ransford a.k.a. Allan Clarke, Tony Hicks and Graham Nash; except where indicated

Side one

1. "Somebody Help Me" (Jackie Edwards) – 2:02
2. "So Lonely" – 2:40
3. "Kiss Your Man Goodbye" (Don Everly, Phil Everly) – 2:35
4. "Signs That Will Never Change" – 3:05
5. "Like Every Time Before" – 1:56
6. "Pretty Flamingo" (Mark Barkan) – 2:36

Side two

1. "I've Been Wrong Before" – 2:13
2. "Have You Ever Loved Somebody?" – 2:55
3. "The Collector" (Sonny Curtis, Don Everly, Phil Everly) – 2:37
4. "Don't Run and Hide" – 2:36
5. "Fifi the Flea" – 2:42
6. "Hard Hard Year" – 2:56

== The Hollies versions ==
The Hollies have also released own versions of their songs:

- "So Lonely" (1965, was B-side to "Look Through Any Window")
- "Signs That Will Never Change" (1967, would become B-side to "Carrie Anne.")
- "Like Every Time Before" (1968 European single b-side, 1988 Rarities album & "Butterfly" Bonus Track)
- "I've Been Wrong Before" (1965, Hollies album track, as "I've Been Wrong")
- "Have You Ever Loved Somebody?" (1967, Evolution album track, also released by The Searchers and Paul and Barry Ryan in 1966)
- "Don't Run and Hide" (1966, B-side to "Bus Stop")
- "Fifi the Flea" and "Hard Hard Year" (1966, Would You Believe? album tracks)

== Recording details ==
Tracks 4, 5, 8, 10, 11 & 12

- Recorded May 14, 1966, Decca Studio, West Hampstead, London, UK

Don & Phil Everly (vocals); Tony Hicks, Bobby Elliott, Graham Nash and Bernie Calvert (instrumentation); with Jimmy Page (guitar), John Paul Jones (bass), Andy White (drums), Arthur Greenslade (keyboards).

Tracks 2, 3, 7 & 9

- Recorded June 2, 1966, at United Recording Corporation, Hollywood, California, USA

Don & Phil Everly (vocals); James Burton, Glen Campbell, Al Casey, Jay Lacy, Don Lanier, Bud Coleman (guitars); Terry Slater (bass); Jim Gordon (drums); Don Randi, Billy Liebert (keyboards).

Tracks 1 & 6

- Recorded June 3, 1966, at United Recording Corporation, Hollywood, California, USA

Personnel same as June 2 session, but with Leslie Milton (drums) in place of Jim Gordon, and the addition of Larry Knechtel as another keyboard player. Knechtel also overdubbed some keyboard parts onto the June 2 session tracks.
