= Christmas with the Everly Brothers and the Boys Town Choir =

Christmas with the Everly Brothers and the Boystown Choir
- Cover of original album; painting by Jim Jonson

Studio album by The Everly Brothers
- Released: 1962
- Recorded: August 1962
- Genre: Christmas
- Label: Warner Bros.

The Everly Brothers chronology
Instant Party! (1962)	Christmas with the Everly Brothers and the Boystown Choir (1962)	The Everly Brothers Sing Great Country Hits (1963)

Professional ratings
Review scores
Source	Rating
Allmusic	3.5/5 stars
New Record Mirror	4/5 stars

Christmas with the Everly Brothers and the Boystown Choir is an album by The Everly Brothers, originally released in 1962. This Christmas album includes the 33-member Boys Town Choir and the Boys Town organ in Omaha, Nebraska.

Two songs, "Away in a Manger" and "Angels from the Realms of Glory", are sung entirely by the choir. Don Everly performs "What Child Is This?" solo and Phil sings "O Little Town of Bethlehem".

The album was re-released on CD by Rhino Flashback in 2005 with a bonus track, "The First Noel".

== Track listing ==
Side one

1. "Adeste Fideles (O Come All Ye Faithful)" (Traditional) – 2:16
2. "Away in a Manger" (Traditional) – 2:05
3. "God Rest Ye Merry, Gentlemen" (Traditional) – 1:30
4. "What Child Is This?" (William Chatterton Dix, Traditional) – 2:21
5. "Silent Night" (Franz Xaver Gruber, Joseph Mohr, Traditional) – 3:01

Side two

6. "Hark! The Herald Angels Sing" (Felix Mendelssohn, Traditional) – 2:12
7. "Angels, From the Realms of Glory" (Traditional) – 3:28
8. "Deck the Halls with Boughs of Holly" (Traditional) – 1:35
9. "Bring a Torch, Jeannette, Isabella" (Traditional) – 1:30
10. "O Little Town of Bethlehem" (Traditional) – 2:17
11. "We Wish You a Merry Christmas" (Traditional) – 1:22
