= Songs Our Daddy Taught Us =

Studio album by the Everly Brothers
- Released: December 1958
- Recorded: August 13–17, 1958
- Length: 40:22
- Label: Cadence
- Producer: Archie Bleyer

The Everly Brothers chronology
| The Everly Brothers (1958) | Songs Our Daddy Taught Us (1958) | The Everly Brothers' Best (1959) |

Songs Our Daddy Taught Us (1958) is the second studio album by American singing duo the Everly Brothers. The album is based on a selection of songs that the brothers learned as boys from their father, Ike Everly. Originally released on Cadence Records, the album has been re-released on LP and CD many times, primarily by Rhino and EMI.

== Reception ==
Professional ratings
Review scores
| Source | Rating |
|---|---|
| AllMusic | 4.5/5 stars |
| The Encyclopedia of Popular Music | 4/5 stars |
| The Rolling Stone Album Guide | 4/5 stars |

Music journalist Richie Unterberger notes that the album of traditional music, released at the peak of the duo's commercial success as a rock and roll act, was unexpected and "ahead of its time". The New Rolling Stone Album Guide, which awarded the album 4 out of 5 stars, noted that not even Elvis Presley "had the nerve to do an album as rootsy" as this one.

== Chart performance ==
The album debuted on Cashbox magazine's Best-Selling Pop Albums chart in the issue dated January 17, 1959, peaking at No. 17 during a three-week run on the chart.

== Track listing ==
Side one
| No. | Title | Writer(s) | Length |
|---|---|---|---|
| 1. | "Roving Gambler" | Traditional | 3:38 |
| 2. | "Down in the Willow Garden" | Charlie Monroe, traditional | 3:04 |
| 3. | "Long Time Gone" | Leslie York, The York Brothers | 2:26 |
| 4. | "Lightning Express" | Bradley Kincaid (Note: Actually written as "Please, Mr. Conductor, Don't Put Me Off the Train" by J. Fred Helf and E. P. Moran) | 4:53 |
| 5. | "That Silver Haired Daddy of Mine" | Gene Autry, Jimmy Long | 3:09 |
| 6. | "Who's Gonna Shoe Your Pretty Little Feet?" | Traditional | 2:41 |

Side two
| No. | Title | Writer(s) | Length |
|---|---|---|---|
| 7. | "Barbara Allen" | Traditional | 4:41 |
| 8. | "Oh So Many Years" | Frankie Bailes | 2:37 |
| 9. | "I'm Here to Get My Baby Out of Jail" | Karl Davis, Harty Taylor | 3:38 |
| 10. | "Rockin' Alone (In an Old Rockin' Chair)" | Bob Miller | 3:01 |
| 11. | "Kentucky" | Karl Davis (Note: Credited to Henry Prichard) | 3:10 |
| 12. | "Put My Little Shoes Away" | Samuel N. Mitchell, Charles E. Pratt | 3:21 |

== Personnel ==
- Don Everly – guitar, vocals
- Phil Everly – guitar, vocals
- Floyd Chance – upright bass

== Legacy ==
In 2013, Green Day frontman Billie Joe Armstrong and jazz singer Norah Jones recorded a remake of the album, titled Foreverly. It was released on November 25, 2013.

== Charts ==
| Chart (1959) | Peak position |
|---|---|
| US Cashbox Best-Selling Pop Albums | 17 |
