= Bottle Up and Go =

Traditional blues song

"Bottle It Up and Go"

Single by Tommy McClennan
- A-side: "Whiskey Headed Woman"
- Released: 1939
- Recorded: November 22, 1939
- Studio: RCA Studio A, Chicago
- Genre: Blues
- Length: 2:46
- Label: Bluebird
- Songwriter(s): Unknown

"Bottle Up and Go" or "Bottle It Up and Go" is a song that is a standard of the blues. Based on earlier songs, Delta bluesman Tommy McClennan recorded "Bottle It Up and Go" in 1939. The song has been interpreted and recorded by numerous artists, sometimes using alternate titles, such as "Step It Up and Go", "Shake It Up and Go", etc.

== Memphis Jug Band and Sonny Boy Williamson versions ==
In 1932, the earliest version of "Bottle It Up and Go", a hokum blues with jug band accompaniment, was recorded by the Memphis Jug Band, a loose musical collective led by Will Shade and Charlie Burse. Although it has been said to be based on a "traditional piece known in the South", it was very much a modern concoction, for the lyrics refer directly to women driving automobiles, a theme that was continued in later versions by almost all other artists. A second version of the song was recorded and released by the Memphis Jug Band in 1934.

In 1937, John Lee "Sonny Boy" Williamson recorded the song as "Got the Bottle Up and Go" (or "Got Bottle Up & Gone"). It was performed as an early Chicago blues with Williamson on vocal and harmonica, accompanied by Big Joe Williams and Robert Lee McCoy (later known as Robert Nighthawk) on guitars.

These early versions of "Bottle Up and Go" include the refrain "High-powered mama, daddy's (or papa's) got your water on", a line that had first appeared in 1930 as the title of the unrelated Memphis Jug Band song "Papa's Got Your Bath Water On", written and sung by Hattie Hart.

== Tommy McClennan song ==
In 1939, Tommy McClennan recorded "Bottle It Up and Go" during his first recording session for Bluebird Records. His song includes "a catchy guitar lick, a stomping danceable groove and a neat structure which divided the twelve-bar [blues] stanza into verse and chorus: socking home a different coupler each time". It is a solo piece with McClennan on vocal and guitar and borrows lyrics from earlier songs. McClennan used verses similar to those found in "Hesitation Blues": "Now nickel is a nickel, a dime is a dime" and "The Duck's Yas-Yas-Yas": "Now my mama killed a chicken, she thought it was a duck, she put 'im on the table with 'is legs sticking up". He also used verses similar to those in Julius Daniels' 1927 song "Can't Put the Bridle On That Mule This Morning": "Now the nigger and the white man playin' seven-up, nigger beat the white man [but he's] scared to pick it [the winnings] up". These verses have been traced back to 19th-century work songs, which were noted in an 1870s newspaper article.

McClennan, who had recently arrived in Chicago from the Delta, was cautioned by Big Bill Broonzy about using racially loaded lyrics in northern cities. According to Broonzy, McClennan stubbornly refused to compromise, resulting in a hasty exit out a window during one performance with McClennan's smashed guitar around his neck. "McClennan, for his part, reflected pensively that they had indeed been forced to 'bottle it up and go'". Bluebird released the song as the B-side of "Whiskey Headed Woman" in 1939. When McClennan re-recorded the song as "Shake It Up and Go" in 1942, he used different lyrics.

== John Lee Hooker versions ==
John Lee Hooker performed several adaptations of "Bottle Up and Go" throughout his career and recorded several versions of the song, usually varying the lyrics. Biographer Charles Shaar Murray identified the song as "one of the templates on which a significant slice of Hooker's early repertoire is based". Hooker first recorded a solo performance as "Bundle Up and Go" in 1959 for The Country Blues of John Lee Hooker album. Around the same time, he recorded another version as "You Gotta Shake It Up and Go", which had a group arrangement. Hooker's later versions are usually titled "Bottle Up and Go" and are included on the albums John Lee Hooker on Campus (1963), It Serve You Right to Suffer (1966), Hooker 'n Heat (with Canned Heat, 1971), and Boom Boom (1992).

== Other renditions ==
Most versions of "Bottle Up and Go" recorded after Tommy McClennan's single use a combination of his verses and new lyrics. Recordings in the 1940s (often with a variation on the title) include those by Blind Boy Fuller (as "Step It Up and Go") (1940), and Sonny Terry and Brownie McGhee (1942). Murray suggests that Chuck Berry's "Too Much Monkey Business" (1956) is adapted from McClennan's song.

In 1952, B.B. King recorded a version with Ike Turner on piano that was released on RPM Records as "Shake It Up and Go". However, "King confuses himself by saying 'bottle up and go' half the time", according to music writer Colin Escott. King later re-recorded it for the Blues on the Bayou album (1998). Bob Dylan recorded the tune as "Step It Up and Go" for his 1992 album Good as I Been to You. His interpretation has been described as being similar to Blind Boy Fuller's version, although writer Brian Hinton believes "he probably knew it via the Everly Brothers". The Everly Brothers recorded an uptempo version of the song, which is the opening track on their 1962 album Instant Party!.
