= So Sad (To Watch Good Love Go Bad) =

Single by The Everly Brothers

from the album It's Everly Time
- A-side: "Lucille"
- Released: August 1960
- Genre: Pop
- Length: 2:30
- Label: Warner Bros.
- Songwriter: Don Everly
- Producer: Mark Linett

The Everly Brothers singles chronology
"When Will I Be Loved" (1960)	"So Sad (To Watch Good Love Go Bad)" (1960)	"Like Strangers" (1960)

"So Sad (To Watch Good Love Go Bad)" is a song written by Don Everly, which was released by The Everly Brothers in 1960. The song was later a country hit for multiple artists in the 1970s and 80s.

== The Everly Brothers version ==
In 1960, The Everly Brothers released the song as a single and on the album It's Everly Time. The song was a top 10 hit in multiple countries, and spent 12 weeks on the Billboard Hot 100 chart, peaking at No. 7, while reaching No. 4 on the United Kingdom's Record Retailer and New Musical Express charts, and No. 7 on New Zealand's "Lever Hit Parade". The song was a major hit in other countries as well.

=== Charts ===
Chart (1960)	Peak position
Australia	19
Canada (CHUM Hit Parade)	18
New Zealand (Lever Hit Parade)	7
Belgium (Flanders)	15
UK Record Retailer	4
UK New Musical Express	4
US Billboard Hot 100	7
US Billboard Hot R&B Sides	16
US Cash Box Top 100	9
US Cash Box Records Disc Jockeys Played Most	7
US Cash Box Top Ten Juke Box Tunes	9
US Cash Box Country Top 50	31
Belgium (Wallonia)	23

== Cover versions ==
In 1968, The Hombres included a cover on their only album Let It Out (Let It All Hang Out).

In 1969, Dillard and Clark included a cover on their LP "Through the Morning, Through the Night". This group consisted of Gene Clark of The Byrds and Doug Dillard of The Dillards, as well as future member of The Eagles, Bernie Leadon.

Brian Hyland released a version of the song on his 1969 album Tragedy-A Million to One.

In 1970, a cover of was released by Hank Williams, Jr. and Lois Johnson as a single and on the album Removing the Shadow. Their version reached No. 12 on Billboard's Hot Country Singles chart, No. 8 on the Cash Box Country Top 65, No. 8 on the Record World Top Country Singles chart, and No. 10 on Canada's "Top 50 RPM Country" chart.

Connie Smith released a cover of the song in 1976, as a single and on her album I Don't Wanna Talk It Over Anymore. Smith's version reached No. 31 on the Billboard's Hot Country Singles chart and No. 19 on the Cash Box Top 100 Country chart.

In 1977, Don Everly released a solo version of the song on the album Brother Juke-Box.

A cover was released by Steve Wariner in 1978, which reached No. 76 on the Billboard's Hot Country Singles chart, No. 73 on the Cash Box Top 100 Country chart, and No. 81 on the Record World Country Singles Chart.

Emmylou Harris released a cover of the song on her 1982 album Last Date, and as a single. In 1983, Harris's version reached No. 28 on the Billboard's Hot Country Singles chart, No. 31 on Cash Box's Top 100 Country Singles, and No. 14 on Canada's RPM "Country 50 Singles" chart.

The Sweethearts of the Rodeo covered the song on their One Time, One Night album in 1988, but the song was not released as a single.

The French singer Françoise Hardy included the song in her year 2000 album Clair-obscur as a duet with Étienne Daho.

Jeff Lynne also recorded it on his album Long Wave in 2012.
