= Stories We Could Tell =

Studio album by the Everly Brothers
- Released: March 1972
- Recorded: August 23, 1971 – January 12, 1972
- Genre: Country rock
- Length: 38:35
- Label: RCA
- Producer: Paul Rothchild

The Everly Brothers chronology
The Everly Brothers Show (1970)	Stories We Could Tell (1972)	Pass the Chicken & Listen (1973)

Professional ratings
Review scores
Source	Rating
AllMusic	3.5/5 stars
Christgau's Record Guide	C
The New Rolling Stone Album Guide	3.5/5 stars

Stories We Could Tell is a country rock album by the Everly Brothers, released in 1972. It was reissued as Stories We Could Tell:The RCA Years by BMG in 2003 and included additional tracks, all stemming from the successor album Pass the Chicken & Listen. In 2014 it was re-released once more on Stories We Could Tell + Pass The Chicken & Listen by Morello Records.

== Track listing ==
Side 1

1. "All We Really Want to Do" (Bonnie Bramlett, Delaney Bramlett) – 2:22
2. "Breakdown" (Kris Kristofferson) – 3:12
3. "Green River" (Don Everly, Phil Everly) – 4:42
4. "Mandolin Wind" (Rod Stewart) – 3:01
5. "Up in Mabel's Room" (Phil Everly, Terry Slater) – 3:15
6. "Del Rio Dan" (Jeff Kent, Doug Lubahn, Holly Beckwith) – 3:57

Side 2

7. "Ridin' High" (Dennis Linde) – 2:41
8. "Christmas Eve Can Kill You (When You're Trying to Hitch a Ride to Anywhere)" (Dennis Linde) – 3:26
9. "Three Armed, Poker-Playin' River Rat" (Dennis Linde) – 2:46
10. "I'm Tired of Singing My Song in Las Vegas" (Don Everly) – 3:14
11. "The Brand New Tennessee Waltz" (Jesse Winchester) – 3:11
12. "Stories We Could Tell" (John Sebastian) – 3:19

== Personnel ==
- Don Everly – guitar, vocals
- Phil Everly – guitar, vocals
- Delaney Bramlett – guitar, vocals
- Bonnie Bramlett – vocals
- Jeff Kent – guitar, vocals
- Dennis Linde – guitar, keyboards
- Geoff Muldaur – guitar
- Wayne Perkins – guitar
- John Sebastian – guitar, harmonica, vocals
- Waddy Wachtel – guitar
- Danny Weis – guitar
- Clarence White – guitar
- Ry Cooder – electric bottle neck guitar on "Green River" and "Del Rio Dan"
- Buddy Emmons – slide guitar
- Jerry McGee – slide guitar
- Barry Beckett – keyboards
- Michael Fonfara – keyboards
- Spooner Oldham – keyboards
- Warren Zevon – keyboards
- Johnny Barbata – drums
- Jim Gordon – drums
- Russ Kunkel – drums
- George Bohanon – brass
- Tommy Johnson – brass
- Chris Ethridge – bass
- Jimmie Haskell – string arrangement
- David Crosby – vocals
- Doug Lubahn – vocals
- Graham Nash – vocals

Technical

- Norman Seeff – photography
