= Born Yesterday (album) =

Studio album by the Everly Brothers
- Released: January 1986
- Recorded: 1985
- Studio: Maison Rouge, London
- Genre: Pop, country
- Length: 45:02
- Label: Mercury
- Producer: Dave Edmunds

The Everly Brothers chronology
All They Had to Do Was Dream (1985)	Born Yesterday (1986)	Some Hearts (1988)

Born Yesterday is an album by the Everly Brothers, released in 1986. It peaked at No. 83 on the Billboard 200 and No. 22 on the Top Country Albums charts. The title track, written by Don, was the first single; "I Know Love" was the second.

== Production ==
The album was produced by Dave Edmunds. "Why Worry" is a cover of the Dire Straits song. "Amanda Ruth" is a cover of the Rank and File song, which had been inspired by the brothers' version of "Lucille".

== Critical reception ==
Professional ratings
Review scores
Source	Rating
AllMusic	2/5 stars
The Encyclopedia of Popular Music	3/5 stars

The Star Tribune wrote that the album "has no irresistible tunes but plenty of good, well-crafted numbers." The Gazette noted that the "adult-oriented pop and country record has an almost limpid quality to it; partially due to the brother's effortless harmonies; partly because of Edmond's hands-off production; and partly thanks to the astounding virtuosity of veteran players."

== Track listing ==
1. "Amanda Ruth" (Chip Kinman, Tony Kinman) 3:17
2. "I Know Love" (Brian Neary, Jim Photoglo) 2:37
3. "Born Yesterday" (Don Everly) 4:00
4. "These Shoes" (Jon Goin, Larry Lee) 3:45
5. "Arms of Mary" (Iain Sutherland) 2:25
6. "That Uncertain Feeling" (Steve Gould) 3:11
7. "Thinkin' 'Bout You" (Billy Burnette, Larry Henley) 2:45
8. "Why Worry" (Mark Knopfler) 4:45
9. "Abandoned Love" (Bob Dylan) 4:03
10. "Don't Say Goodnight" (Brian Neary, Jim Photoglo) 4:37
11. "Always Drive a Cadillac" (Larry Raspberry) 5:02
12. "You Send Me" (Sam Cooke) 3:42

== Personnel ==
- Don Everly - vocals
- Phil Everly - vocals
- Albert Lee, Phil Donnelly - guitar
- Phil Cranham - bass guitar
- Pete Wingfield - keyboards
- Larrie Londin - drums
- Liam O'Flynn - Irish pipes, tin whistle on "Abandoned Love"

== Chart performance ==
Chart (1986)	Peak position
U.S. Billboard Top Country Albums	22
U.S. Billboard 200	83
Canadian RPM Top Albums	82
Dutch Albums Chart	46
