= Pass the Chicken & Listen =

Studio album by The Everly Brothers
- Released: 1972
- Recorded: July 24–27, 1972
- Studio: RCA Studio B, Nashville
- Genre: Country
- Length: 34:56
- Label: RCA
- Producer: Chet Atkins

The Everly Brothers chronology
Stories We Could Tell (1972)	Pass the Chicken & Listen (1972)	The New Album (1977)

Professional ratings
Review scores
Source	Rating
AllMusic	3/5 stars

Pass the Chicken & Listen is an album by The Everly Brothers, released in 1972. It was the last studio recording the brothers made for over 10 years.

It was re-released on CD by One Way Records in 1997. In 2014 it was reissued as a twofer CD with Stories We Could Tell by Morello Records.

== Track listing ==
=== Side one ===
1. "Lay It Down" (Gene Thomas) – 3:18
2. "Husbands and Wives" (Roger Miller) – 2:23
3. "Woman Don't You Try to Tie Me Down" (Joe Allen) – 4:01
4. "Sweet Memories" (Mickey Newbury) – 2:55
5. "Ladies Love Outlaws" (Lee Clayton) – 3:13
6. "Not Fade Away" (Buddy Holly, Norman Petty) – 2:01

=== Side two ===
1. "Watchin' It Go" (Gene Thomas) – 2:26
2. "Paradise" (John Prine) – 3:37
3. "Somebody Nobody Knows" (Kris Kristofferson) – 3:37
4. "Good Hearted Woman" (Waylon Jennings, Willie Nelson) – 2:34
5. "A Nickel for the Fiddler" (Guy Clark) – 2:24
6. "Rocky Top" (Felice Bryant, Boudleaux Bryant) – 2:53

== Personnel ==
- Don Everly – acoustic guitar, vocals
- Phil Everly – acoustic guitar, vocals
- Chet Atkins – acoustic guitar
- David Briggs – piano
- Johnny Gimble – fiddle, mandolin
- Ralph Gallant – drums
- Weldon Myrick – pedal steel guitar
- Hargus "Pig" Robbins – organ, piano
- Hal Rugg – pedal steel guitar
- Steve Schaffer – bass
- Dale Sellers – acoustic guitar, dobro
- Pete Wade – acoustic guitar
- Paul Yandell – acoustic guitar
- Bobby Thompson – acoustic guitar, banjo

Production

- Chet Atkins – producer
- David Kershenbaum – production assistant
- Les Ladd – engineer
- Bill Vandervort – engineer
