= Made to Love (The Everly Brothers song) =

1960 song by the Everly Brothers

Song by the Everly Brothers

from the album A Date with the Everly Brothers
- Released: October 1960
- Recorded: July 10, 1960
- Studio: RCA Studio B, Nashville, Tennessee
- Length: 2:05
- Label: Warner Bros.
- Songwriter: Phil Everly
- Producer: Archie Bleyer

"Made to Love" is a song written by Phil Everly and originally recorded by the Everly Brothers in 1960 on their fourth studio album A Date with the Everly Brothers. Unlike the majority of the Everly Brothers' recordings, "Made to Love" features Phil on lead vocals with Don singing the harmony.

== Eddie Hodges version ==
"(Girls, Girls, Girls) Made to Love"

Single by Eddie Hodges
- B-side: "I Make Believe It's You"
- Released: May 1962
- Recorded: November 26, 1961
- Studio: Bradley Studios (Nashville, Tennessee)
- Genre: Pop
- Length: 2:25
- Label: Cadence
- Songwriter: Phil Everly
- Producer: Archie Bleyer

Eddie Hodges singles chronology
"Bandit of My Dreams" (1961)	"(Girls, Girls, Girls) Made to Love" (1962)	"Seein' Is Believin'" (1962)

In 1961, teen singer Eddie Hodges recorded a cover of "Made to Love", which was released as single with the altered title "(Girls, Girls, Girls) Made to Love" in May 1962.

=== Recording and release ===
After producer Archie Bleyer played Hodges Phil Everly's demo of "Made to Love", Hodges was eager to record it as the Everly Brothers were then his favourite artists. He recorded it in New York City; however, Bleyer did not like how it sounded, so they went to Nashville to record at Bradley Studio B (also known as the Quonset hut studio). This recording took place on November 26, 1961, and featured backing by Charlie McCoy and the Escorts. Hodges and Bleyer both agreed that this recording sounded better.

The release of "(Girls, Girls, Girls) Made to Love" in May 1962 followed the success of "I'm Gonna Knock on Your Door", which reached number 12 on the Billboard Hot 100 in 1961, and "Bandit of My Dreams" which was a minor hit in early 1962. "(Girls, Girls, Girls) Made to Love" peaked at number 14 on the Billboard Hot 100, becoming Hodges' final top-twenty hit in the US and also his final release on Bleyer's record label Cadence.

Cash Box described "(Girls, Girls, Girls) Made to Love" as a "a happy-go-lucky romantic twist'er that sports a dandy instrumental showcase" and Billboard described it as "a bouncy reading of a cute lyric against simple but effective backing".

=== Charts ===
Chart (1962)	Peak position
Australia (Kent Music Report)	47
Canada (CHUM)	1
UK Singles (Official Charts)	37
US Billboard Hot 100	14
US Cash Box Top 100	20

== Claude François version ==
Belles ! Belles ! Belles !

EP by Claude François
- Released: September 27, 1962
- Recorded: September 1962
- Studios: Studio Blanqui, Boulevard Auguste-Blanqui, Paris
- Genre: French pop
- Length: 8:40
- Label: Fontana
- Producer: Jean-Jacques Tilché

Claude François chronology
Le Nabout twist (1962)	Belles ! Belles ! Belles ! (1962)	Dis-lui (1963)

French singer Claude François recorded a cover of "Made to Love" as "Belles ! Belles ! Belles !" which was released as an EP in September 1962. It was his first success, going on to sell over 750,000 copies within four months of its release.

=== Background ===
After signing to Fontana Records, François released his first EP, Le Nabout twist in March 1962. However, it was a commercial failure. Singer Régine made François listen to "Made to Love" and he was captivated by it. He then took the song to Fontana artistic director Jean-Jacques Tilché with a view to recording it, but the song was already reserved for labelmate Lucky Blondo with a version adapted by lyricist Vline Buggy. François pleaded with Tilché and convinced him to allow him to record the song. François was also not so impressed by Buggy's adaptation, so the two met and made several alterations for what would become "Belles ! Belles ! Belles !".

The song was then quickly recorded at the Studio Blanqui on the Boulevard Auguste-Blanqui in the 13th arrondissement of Paris. Soon afterwards, Tilché and François gave a copy of the recording to Daniel Filipacchi, presenter of the music radio programme Salut les copains. With the influence of programmer Michel Poulain, Filipacchi agreed to play the song. After several months, "Belles ! Belles ! Belles !" had become a favourite. The plugging and hyping on Salut les copains directly impacted record sales, with the EP beginning to largely sell in January 1963.

=== Release ===
Typical of releases at the time in France, "Belles ! Belles ! Belles !" was commercially released as an EP which was the preferred medium of release until later in the 1960s. Jukebox singles featuring the tracks from the EP were also released. The song was the title and lead track on the EP, with "Moi je pense encore à toi" (a cover of Neil Sedaka's "Breaking Up Is Hard to Do") as the other A-side. The B-sides were "Venus en blue-jeans" (a cover of Jimmy Clanton's "Venus in Blue Jeans") and "Hey Potatoes" (a cover of Billy Nash's instrumental of the same name, strongly influenced by Bobby Day's "(Do the) Mashed Potatoes").

=== Video ===
During the winter of 1962, a scopitone by Claude Lelouch was filmed for "Belles ! Belles ! Belles !" at the Saint-Cloud forest. Lelouch later recounted that "my idea was a country scene with pretty girls dancing around in cocktail dresses. But when we arrived [at the forest], everything was white. It had snowed all night. Constraint created the solution. I damned the snow, put anti-skid under Claude François' shoes and I made him dance the mashed potato in the snow in a red jumper".

=== Track listing ===
Side A
No.	Title	Writer(s)	Length
1.	"Belles ! Belles ! Belles !"	Phil Everly, Vline Buggy, Claude François	2:10
2.	"Moi je pense encore à toi"	Neil Sedaka, Howard Greenfield, Georges Aber, André Salvet	2:20

Side B
No.	Title	Writer(s)	Length
3.	"Venus en blue-jeans"	Greenfield, Jack Keller, Claude Carrère, Aber	2:10
4.	"Hey Potatoes"	Billy Nash, François	2:00

=== Charts ===
Chart (1963)	Peak position
Belgium (Ultratop 50 Wallonia)	5
France	3

== Other versions ==
- At the request of television host Jean-Pierre Foucault, French pop duo Début de Soirée recorded a cover of "Belles ! Belles ! Belles !" for a special anniversary broadcast of Claude François on Sacrée Soirée. Released as a single in June 1990, their version peaked at number 49 on the French Singles Chart.
