= Heartaches and Harmonies =

Heartaches & Harmonies

Box set by The Everly Brothers
- Released: 1994
- Genre: Rock
- Length: 4:26:19
- Label: Rhino

The Everly Brothers chronology
Some Hearts (1989)	Heartaches & Harmonies (1994)	Too Good to Be True (2005)

Professional ratings
Review scores
Source	Rating
AllMusic	5/5 stars
The Encyclopedia of Popular Music	5/5 stars

Heartaches & Harmonies is a compilation box set CD by the rock and roll duo The Everly Brothers, released in 1994. It contains 103 songs spanning from a 1951 radio performance of "Don't Let Our Love Die" through 1990. The collection features their early hits from Cadence and a substantial representation of their work with Warner Bros. Alternate takes and less successful singles are also included.

== Track listing ==
Disc one
No.	Title	Length
1.	"Don't Let Our Love Die (1951 Version)"	3:11
2.	"Keep A' Lovin' Me"	2:27
3.	"Bye Bye Love"	2:23
4.	"I Wonder If I Care as Much"	2:16
5.	"Hey, Doll Baby (Demo Version)"	2:16
6.	"Wake Up Little Susie"	2:03
7.	"Maybe Tomorrow"	2:08
8.	"All I Have to Do Is Dream"	2:21
9.	"Claudette"	2:16
10.	"Brand New Heartache"	2:18
11.	"Bird Dog"	2:17
12.	"Devoted to You"	2:25
13.	"Problems"	1:58
14.	"Long Time Gone"	2:26
15.	"I'm Here to Get My Baby Out of Jail"	3:37
16.	"Kentucky"	3:09
17.	"Poor Jenny"	2:11
18.	"Take a Message to Mary"	2:28
19.	"('Til) I Kissed You"	2:24
20.	"Let It Be Me"	2:38
21.	"Since You Broke My Heart"	1:57
22.	"When Will I Be Loved"	2:03
23.	"Like Strangers"	2:00
Total length:		55:12

Disc two
No.	Title	Length
1.	"Cathy's Clown"	2:26
2.	"Always It's You"	2:31
3.	"So Sad (To Watch Good Love Go Bad)"	2:36
4.	"That's What You Do to Me"	2:04
5.	"Sleepless Nights"	2:24
6.	"Carol Jane"	1:52
7.	"Lucille"	2:34
8.	"Made to Love"	2:06
9.	"Stick with Me Baby"	1:57
10.	"Love Hurts"	2:23
11.	"So How Come (No One Loves Me)"	2:18
12.	"Donna, Donna"	2:16
13.	"Ebony Eyes"	3:07
14.	"Walk Right Back"	2:19
15.	"Why Not"	2:46
16.	"Temptation"	2:14
17.	"Don't Blame Me"	3:28
18.	"Muskrat (Single Version)"	2:20
19.	"Crying in the Rain"	2:02
20.	"I'm Not Angry"	2:03
21.	"Step It Up and Go"	2:00
22.	"That's Old Fashioned (That's the Way Love Should Be)"	2:25
23.	"How Can I Meet Her?"	1:51
24.	"Nancy's Minuet (Alternate Version)"	2:22
25.	"Nice Guy (Alternate Version)"	2:03
26.	"Ends"	2:29
27.	"No One Can Make My Sunshine Smile"	2:07
28.	"So It Always Will Be"	1:57
29.	"I'm Afraid"	1:52
30.	"The Girl Sang the Blues"	2:13
31.	"Love Her"	2:21
32.	"The Ferris Wheel"	2:19
33.	"Things Go Better with Coke"	1:29
Total length:		75:14

Disc three
No.	Title	Length
1.	"Gone, Gone, Gone"	2:05
2.	"Torture"	2:26
3.	"You're My Girl"	2:27
4.	"The Price of Love"	2:07
5.	"It Only Costs a Dime"	1:57
6.	"Love Is Strange"	2:55
7.	"Man with Money"	2:22
8.	"To Show I Love You"	2:35
9.	"I'll See Your Light"	2:44
10.	"It's All Over"	2:22
11.	"I Used to Love You"	2:22
12.	"And I'll Go"	2:17
13.	"(You Got) The Power of Love"	2:40
14.	"Leave My Girl Alone"	2:23
15.	"Somebody Help Me"	2:06
16.	"So Lonely"	2:39
17.	"Kiss Your Man Goodbye"	2:36
18.	"The Collector"	2:58
19.	"Even If I Hold It in My Hand (Hard Luck Story)"	3:29
20.	"Bowling Green"	2:46
21.	"I Don't Want to Love You"	2:43
22.	"Mary Jane"	3:16
23.	"Love of the Common People"	3:08
24.	"You're Just What I Was Looking for Today"	2:56
Total length:		62:19

Disc four
No.	Title	Length
1.	"Empty Boxes"	2:46
2.	"Love with Your Heart"	3:01
3.	"Milk Train"	2:48
4.	"Lord of the Manor"	4:51
5.	"Mama Tried"	2:20
6.	"T for Texas"	3:34
7.	"I Wonder If I Care as Much (Version Two)"	2:58
8.	"You Done Me Wrong"	2:16
9.	"Turn Around"	2:49
10.	"Omaha"	3:22
11.	"I'm on My Way Home Again"	2:23
12.	"Cuckoo Bird"	2:45
13.	"Carolina in My Mind"	3:19
14.	"My Little Yellow Bird"	2:05
15.	"Stories We Could Tell"	3:22
16.	"Green River"	4:44
17.	"Poems, Prayers and Promises"	4:02
18.	"Paradise"	3:36
19.	"On the Wings of a Nightingale"	2:37
20.	"Why Worry"	4:49
21.	"Arms of Mary"	2:30
22.	"Born Yesterday"	4:05
23.	"Don't Let Our Love Die (1990 Version)"	2:18
Total length:		73:20

== Personnel ==
- Don Everly – guitar, vocals
- Phil Everly – guitar, vocals
