= A Date with the Everly Brothers =

Studio album by the Everly Brothers
- Released: October 1960
- Recorded: March 18, 1960; July 8–13, 1960, July 27, 1960
- Length: 27:55
- Label: Warner Bros.

The Everly Brothers chronology
It's Everly Time (1960)	A Date with the Everly Brothers (1960)	Both Sides of an Evening (1961)

Singles from A Date with the Everly Brothers
- 1. "Cathy's Clown" Released: April 1960

A Date with the Everly Brothers is the fourth studio album by American singing duo the Everly Brothers, released in 1960. It was a commercial success and saw a positive critical reception as well.

The song "Love Hurts" appears here for the first time. It would subsequently be covered by numerous other artists. Other than the "Cathy's Clown"/"Always It's You" single, all of the tracks on A Date with the Everly Brothers were recorded in just four sessions during July 1960.

== Chart performance ==
The album debuted on Billboard magazine's Best-Selling Monophonic LPs chart in the issue dated December 4, 1960, peaking at No. 9 during a twenty-four-week run on the chart. The album debuted on Cashbox magazine's Best-Selling Monaural Albums chart in the issue dated November 19, 1960, peaking at No. 16 during a fifteen-week run on the chart. The album had come close to topping the UK Record Retailer LP charts, peaking at No. 3.

== Legacy ==
Professional ratings
Review scores
Source	Rating
AllMusic	4.5/5 stars
The Encyclopedia of Popular Music	4/5 stars

Writing for AllMusic, critic Richie Unterberger stated, "Although the material is not on the killer level of It's Everly Time, there are some very fine songs on their second Warner LP."

The album was included in Robert Dimery's 1001 Albums You Must Hear Before You Die.

== Track listing ==
Side One
No.	Title	Writer(s)	Length
1.	"Made to Love"	Phil Everly	2:05
2.	"That's Just Too Much"	Don Everly, Phil Everly	2:40
3.	"Stick With Me Baby"	Mel Tillis	1:57
4.	"Baby What You Want Me to Do"	Jimmy Reed	2:20
5.	"Sigh, Cry, Almost Die"	Everly, Everly	2:18
6.	"Always It's You"	Felice Bryant, Boudleaux Bryant	2:30

Side Two
No.	Title	Writer(s)	Length
1.	"Love Hurts"	Boudleaux Bryant	2:23
2.	"Lucille"	Albert Collins, Richard Penniman	2:32
3.	"So How Come (No One Loves Me)"	Bryant, Bryant	2:18
4.	"Donna, Donna"	Bryant, Bryant	2:15
5.	"A Change of Heart"	Bryant, Bryant	2:07
6.	"Cathy's Clown"	Don Everly	2:25

== Personnel ==
- Don Everly – guitar, vocals
- Phil Everly – guitar, vocals

== Charts ==
Chart (1960–1961)	Peak position
UK Record Retailer Top LPs	3
US Billboard Best-Selling Monophonic LPs	9
US Cashbox Best-Selling Monaural Albums	16
