= Some Hearts (The Everly Brothers album) =

Studio album by The Everly Brothers
- Released: November 4, 1988
- Recorded: 1987
- Studio: New River, Fort Lauderdale; Rumbo, Canoga Park; Criterion, Hollywood
- Genre: Pop, pop rock, rock and roll
- Length: 37:50
- Label: Mercury
- Producer: The Everly Brothers, Larrie Londin

The Everly Brothers chronology
Born Yesterday (1986)	Some Hearts (1988)	In Concert: The Reunion (1996)

Professional ratings
Review scores
Source	Rating
AllMusic	3/5 stars
The Encyclopedia of Popular Music	3/5 stars

Some Hearts... is the Everly Brothers' final studio album. It was released on November 4, 1988, and rereleased in 1989. The album did not chart.

"Don't Worry Baby", a cover of the Beach Boys hit, charted in Australia. It is featured on the soundtrack to the 1995 film Bye Bye Love (which itself takes its title from the Everly Brothers song of the same name).

== Track listing ==
1. "Some Hearts" (Don Everly) – 5:22
2. "Don't Worry Baby" (Roger Christian, Brian Wilson) – 3:37
3. "Ride the Wind" (John Durrill, Phil Everly) – 3:29
4. "Be My Love Again" (Don Everly) – 4:36
5. "Can't Get over It" (Don Everly) – 4:25
6. "Angel of the Darkness" (John Durrill, Phil Everly) – 3:48
7. "Brown Eyes" (John Durrill, Phil Everly) – 2:41
8. "Three Bands of Steel" (Don Everly) – 2:45
9. "Julianne" (Patrick Alger, J. Fred Knobloch) – 3:05
10. "Any Single Solitary Heart" (John Hiatt, Mike Porter) – 4:12

== Personnel ==
- Don Everly – vocals, rhythm guitar, acoustic guitar
- Phil Everly – vocals, guitar
- Albert Lee – lead guitar
- Phil Cranham – bass
- Larrie Londin – drums
- Pete Wingfield – keyboards
- Hank DeVito – guitar, steel guitar
- Greg Harris – guitar on "Angel of Darkness"
- John Hobbs – keyboards on "Angel of Darkness" and "Brown Eyes"

Production notes

- Allen Abrahamson – engineer
- Barry Barnes – art direction
- Dave Barton – engineer
- Jeff Giedt – engineer, mixing
- John Hobbs – vocal engineer
- Guy Roche – vocal engineer
- Ted Stein – engineer
