= The New Album =

The New Album: Previously Unreleased Songs from the Early Sixties

Compilation album by The Everly Brothers
- Released: October 1977
- Recorded: July 10, 1960 – November 26, 1968
- Genre: Rock and roll
- Label: Warner Bros.

The Everly Brothers chronology
Pass the Chicken & Listen (1972)	The New Album: Previously Unreleased Songs from the Early Sixties (1977)	EB 84 (1984)

Professional ratings
Review scores
Source	Rating
AllMusic	3.5/5 stars

The New Album: Previously Unreleased Songs from the Early Sixties (or simply The New Album) is an album by The Everly Brothers, released in 1977. Nigel Molden was credited as the Executive Producer; with Geof Lavey as the album co-ordinator.

It was originally released by the British division of Warner Bros. and re-issued in the U.S. by Collectors' Choice Music in 2005. It consists of previously unreleased tracks recorded by the Everlys for Warner Bros. in the 1960s. "Empty Boxes," and "Nancy's Minuet" were B-sides although the version of the latter is an alternative take. "Omaha" was recorded by Don Everly for his 1970 solo album.

== Track listing ==
Side 1

1. "Silent Treatment" (Al Hoffman, Dick Manning) – 2:16
2. "Dancing on My Feet" (Phil Everly) – 1:54
3. "Gran Mamou" (unknown) – 2:27
4. "Burma Shave" (Roger Miller) – 2:28
5. "Nancy's Minuet" (Don Everly) – 2:23
6. "He's Got My Sympathy" (Gerry Goffin, Jack Keller) – 2:07
7. "Little Hollywood Girl" (Gerry Goffin, Jack Keller) – 2:23

Side 2

8. "Omaha" (Don Everly) – 3:19
9. "Empty Boxes" (Ron Elliott) – 2:45
10. "I Can't Say Goodbye to You" (Gerry Goffin, Carole King) – 2:12
11. "Nothing Matters But You" (Gary Geld, Peter Udell) – 2:15
12. "When Snowflakes Fall in the Summer" (Barry Mann, Cynthia Weil) – 2:16
13. "I'll See Your Light" (Bodie Chandler, Edward McKendry) – 2:36
14. "Why Not" (John D. Loudermilk) – 2:43

== Personnel ==
- Don Everly – guitar, vocals
- Phil Everly – guitar, vocals
- Ron Elliott – guitar
