= Bird Dog (song) =

Single by the Everly Brothers

from the album The Best of The Everly Brothers
- A-side: "Devoted to You"
- Released: July 28, 1958
- Recorded: July 10, 1958
- Genre: Pop
- Length: 2:20
- Label: Cadence 1350
- Songwriter: Boudleaux Bryant

The Everly Brothers singles chronology
"All I Have to Do Is Dream" / "Claudette" (1958)	"Bird Dog" / "Devoted to You" (1958)	"Problems" / "Love of My Life" (1958)

"Bird Dog" is a song written by Boudleaux Bryant and recorded by the Everly Brothers. It was released in 1958 and was a No. 1 hit on the Billboard Country Chart for six weeks. The song also hit No. 2 on the U.S. Billboard Hot 100 (stalled behind Domenico Modugno's "Nel blu, dipinto di Blu (Volare)" and Tommy Edwards' "It's All in the Game"), as well as peaking at no. 2 for three weeks on the R&B charts.

== Background ==
The song deals with the singer's dismay that a boy, by the name of Johnny, is trying to take his girlfriend away. The singer calls him a bird dog as a result of his behavior.

The musical structure is relatively unusual in that it has a 12 bar blues stanza and an 8 bar blues chorus.

== Personnel ==
- Don Everly – vocals, guitar
- Phil Everly – vocals, guitar
- Floyd "Lightnin'" Chance – double bass

== Charts ==
Chart (1958)	Peak position
Italy (FIMI)	8
US Billboard Country & Western Best Sellers	1
US Billboard Hot 100	2
US Billboard Hot R&B Sides	2
Australian Singles Chart	1
Canadian Singles Chart	1
United Kingdom (NME)	2
United Kingdom (Record Mirror)	1

=== All-time charts ===
Chart (1958-2018)	Position
US Billboard Hot 100	423

== Cover versions ==
- In 1958, Morris And Mitch recorded a version which was released in the UK.
- In 1958 Gary Cooper and the Sportsmen Quartet sang the song on The Jack Benny Program
- In 1966, The Newbeats released their rendition of the song as a single.
- In 1975, English Glam rock band Mud recorded a cover on their album Use Your Imagination which reached No. 33 on the UK charts.
- In 1978, the Bellamy Brothers recorded it, reaching No. 86 on the Hot Country Singles chart.
