= Floyd Chance =

American session musician (1925–2005)

Lightnin' Chance
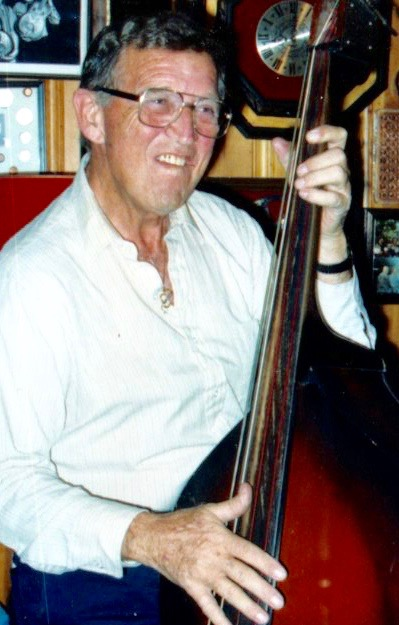
- Lightnin' Chance, ca 1993

Background information
- Born: Floyd Taylor Chance; December 21, 1925; Como, Mississippi, U.S.
- Died: April 11, 2005 (aged 79) Nashville, Tennessee, U.S.
- Occupation: Musician
- Instrument: Double bass
- Years active: 1941–1988

Floyd Taylor Chance (December 21, 1925 – April 11, 2005), often credited as Lightnin' Chance, was an American session musician who played bass on many successful country and pop records, especially in the 1950s and 1960s. His bass playing can be heard on classic country music recordings including: "Your Cheatin' Heart" (Hank Williams); "Bye Bye Love" (The Everly Brothers); "Hello Walls" (Faron Young); "It's Only Make Believe" (Conway Twitty)" and "Poetry In Motion" (Johnny Tillotson). Chance died in 2005 at the age of 79.

== Biography ==
He was born in Como, Mississippi, and learned to play guitar, clarinet, saxophone and tuba while at school. He was nicknamed "Lightnin'" for his prowess on the football field. He received further musical training while serving with the US Navy in World War II, when he performed with the Fourth Fleet Band.

After his discharge, he moved to Memphis, Tennessee, and from 1947 played in Smilin' Eddie Hill's band and on local radio and TV shows. His first recordings were made for Sam Phillips in the studios which later became the home of Sun Records. He also recorded in Nashville, and in 1952 joined a Grand Ole Opry tour that performed at the Astor Hotel in New York City. In September 1952, he played stand-up acoustic bass on Hank Williams' last recording sessions, which produced three No.1 country music singles—"Your Cheatin' Heart", "Kaw-Liga" and "Take These Chains From My Heart".

Chance played bass on many other hit records as a member of "the Nashville A-Team". These included Conway Twitty's "It's Only Make Believe", Faron Young's "Hello Walls", Johnny Tillotson's "Poetry In Motion" and "It Keeps Right On A Hurtin'", he played on the Everly Brothers' "Bird Dog" and "Bye Bye Love". He also recorded with the Louvin Brothers, the Osborne Brothers, Jimmy Martin, and Marvin Rainwater. He performed extensively at the Grand Ole Opry in the 1950s and 1960s, with musicians including Marty Robbins, Patsy Cline, and Willie Nelson. He was also responsible for adapting a vocal chart to be followed by studio instrumentalists who did not read music, which became known as the Nashville Number System.

He retired in 1988. He died in Nashville in 2005 at the age of 79, having suffered from cancer and Alzheimer's disease.
