= Collectors' Choice Music =

Compact disc producer and reseller

Collectors' Choice Music (CCM) is an Itasca, Illinois-based record label and retailer of music on CD. Originally the company was primarily in two businesses, but since 2010 only in the second.

CCM was best known for reissuing albums originally released in LP record form as compact discs. As of 2006, its catalog had reached over 600 titles and by 2009 it had issued around 60 new titles a year. Its own releases were also sold through all other online dealers that sell CDs. By the end of 2010, however, Collectors' Choice had stopped releasing recordings.

CCM's second business line is the sale of CDs (and originally cassettes), both those it has produced and others falling under their emphasis on rare and exotic titles. The company originated in 1993 with a print catalog, which is still maintained as of 2019, although it now encourages people to order online. Both the print and online store offered their own and other rereleases and rare titles, with over 250,000 titles available. By 2019, the rare titles and rereleases by others dominated, and some of CCM's pre-2011 rereleases were out of print.
