= 1870 in music =

== Events ==
- January 6 – The Musikverein concert hall opens in Vienna
- March 16 – Pyotr Ilyich Tchaikovsky's fantasy-overture Romeo and Juliet debuts in Moscow, conducted by Nikolai Rubinstein
- May 25 – Léo Delibes' ballet Coppélia is debuted by the Théâtre Impérial de l'Opéra at the Salle Le Peletier in Paris
- June 26 – Richard Wagner's opera Die Walküre premieres at the Königliches Hof- und National-Theater, Munich
- September – Siege of Paris (1870–71) begins: Georges Bizet, Gabriel Fauré and Camille Saint-Saëns are among those enrolled in the National Guard for defence of the city
- December 25 – Richard Wagner's Siegfried Idyll is premiered this morning privately for the composer's wife Cosima by a small ensemble of the Tonhalle-Orchester Zürich on the stairs of his Villa Tribschen near Lucerne in Switzerland, conducted by Hans Richter. Wagner uses some of the themes in his opera Siegfried which is nearing completion
- Madame Rentz's Female Minstrels established in the United States by Michael B. Leavitt

== Published popular music ==
- "Come In Old Adam, Come In!" w. Alice Cary m. C. F. Shattuck
- "Just Touch the Harp Gently, My Pretty Louise" w. Samuel N. Mitchell m. Charles Blamphin
- "More Love to Thee" w. Elizabeth P. Prentiss m. William H. Doane
- "Pass Me Not O Gentle Savior" w. Fanny Crosby m. William H. Doane
- "Rescue the Perishing" w. Fanny Crosby m. William H. Doane
- "Waiting For Pa" w. & m. Henry Clay Work

== Classical music ==
- Max Bruch – Symphony No. 2 in F minor, Op. 36 (premiered September 4)
- Ignaz Brüll – Tarantella, Op.6
- Antonín Dvořák
  - Dramatic Overture (overture to the opera Alfred) (B. 16a)
  - String Quartet no. 3 in D, B. 18
  - String Quartet no. 4 in E minor, B. 19
- Charles Gounod – Messe des Orphéonistes
- Heinrich Lichner – 3 Sonatinen, Op.66
- Robert Planquette – Le régiment de Sambre et Meuse
- Joachim Raff
  - Piano Trio No.3, Op.155
  - 2 Piano Pieces, Op.157
  - Piano Trio No.4, Op.158
- Josef Rheinberger – Piano Trio No.1, Op.34
- Nikolai Rimsky-Korsakov – 6 Romances, Op.8
- Giovanni Sgambati – Marcia-Inno, arranged for 4-hand piano
- Pyotr Ilyich Tchaikovsky
  - Chorus of Flowers and Insects
  - Nature and Love
  - Romeo and Juliet overture (first version)
  - To Forget So Soon
  - Valse-Scherzo, Op.7
  - Capriccio, Op.8
  - 3 Pieces, Op.9
- Valentin Zubiaurre – Symphony in E major

== Opera ==
- Antonín Dvořák
  - Alfred, B. 16 (libretto by Karl Theodor Körner, premiered in 1938 in Olomouc)
- Karel Miry
  - La Saint-Lucas (opera in 1 act, libretto by J. Story, premiered on February 17 in Ghent)
  - Het Driekoningenfeest (opera in 1 act, libretto by P. Geiregat, premiered in Brussels)
- Emile Pessard – La cruche cassée (comic opera in 1 act, libretto by Hyppolite Lucas and Emile Abraham, premiered on February 21 at the Théâtre de l'Opéra-Comique in Paris)
- Bedřich Smetana – Prodana Nevesta (eng. The Bartered Bride)
- Pyotr Tchaikovsky – Undina, premiered March 28 in Moscow
- Richard Wagner – Die Walküre

== Musical theater ==
- Chilpéric London production
- La Mascotte Paris production
- Jacques Offenbach - La Périchole London production

== Births ==
- January 3 – Henry Eichheim, conductor, violinist and composer (d. 1942)
- January 20 – Guillaume Lekeu, composer (d. 1894)
- January 22 – Charles Tournemire, French composer and organist (d. 1939)
- January 30 – Rudolf Louis, critic, conductor and author (d. 1914)
- February 12 – Marie Lloyd, British music-hall singer (d. 1922)
- February 13 – Leopold Godowsky, Polish American pianist, composer, and teacher (d. 1938)
- March 6 – Oscar Straus, Viennese composer of operettas (d. 1954)
- March 10 – George Evans, songwriter (died 1915)
- March 29 – Tom Lemoinier, composer and performer (died 1945)
- April 7 – Joseph Ryelandt, Belgian composer (d. 1965)
- April 9 – Colin McAlpin, English composer (died 1942)
- April 28 – Hermann Suter, Swiss composer and conductor (d. 1926)
- April 30 – Franz Lehár, composer of operettas and waltzes (d. 1948)
- May 3 – Edouard Gregory Hesselberg, pianist (died 1935)
- May 4 – Zygmunt Stojowski, Polish pianist and composer (d. 1946)
- June 16 – Mon Schjelderup, composer (died 1934)
- July 17 – Harry P. Guy, composer (died 1950)
- July 18 – Emil Młynarski, Polish conductor, violinist, composer, and pedagogue (d. 1935)
- July 27 – Hilaire Belloc, lyricist (died 1953)
- August 4 – Harry Lauder, Scottish singer, comedian and songwriter (d. 1950)
- August 12 – Arthur J. Lamb, lyricist and actor (d. 1928)
- September 28 – Florent Schmitt, French composer (d. 1958)
- October 7 – Uncle Dave Macon, banjo player, singer and songwriter (d.1952)
- October 8 – Louis Vierne, French organist and composer (d. 1937)
- October 24 – August Brunetti-Pisano, Austrian composer (d. 1943)
- November 30 – Cecil Forsyth, composer and musicologist (d. 1941)
- December 5 – Vítězslav Novák, Czech composer (d. 1949)
- December 16 – Alfred Hill, Australian composer (d. 1960)

== Deaths ==
- January 26 – Cesare Pugni, ballet composer
- March 9 – Théodore Labarre, composer (born 1805)
- March 10 – Ignaz Moscheles, Bohemian composer (b. 1794)
- March 16 – Theodore Oesten, musician, composer and music teacher (b. 1813)
- April 8 – Charles de Bériot, violinist (b. 1802)
- April 19 – Camille-Marie Stamaty, French pianist and composer (b. 1811)
- July 22 – Josef Strauss, composer (b. 1827)
- August 14 – Manuel Saumell, composer (b. 1818)
- September 17 – Joseph David Jones, composer and schoolmaster (b. 1827)
- October 20 – Michael William Balfe, composer (b. 1808)
- October 31 – Mihály Mosonyi, composer (b. 1815)
- November 23 – Giuseppina Bozzachi, ballerina (b. 1853)
- December 5
  - Alexandre Dumas, lyricist (born 1802)
  - Herman Severin Løvenskiold, composer (born 1815)
- December 7 – Mykhailo Verbytsky, composer (b. 1815)
- December 17 – Saverio Mercadante, composer (b. 1795)
- December 18 – Eugène Ketterer, French composer and pianist (b. 1831)
- December 28 – Alexei Lvov, Russian composer (b. 1799)
