= 1860 in music =

== Events ==
- January 1 – Julius Friedländer buys the Leipzig music publishing house, CF Peters.
- February 9 – The second "Querelle des Bouffons" is sparked when Hector Berlioz criticizes Richard Wagner's music in the Journal des débats. Wagner responds on February 15.
- February 10 – The Serenade No. 2 in A, Op. 16 by Johannes Brahms is given its first public performance in Hamburg.
- March 3 – The Serenade No. 1 in D, Op. 11 by Johannes Brahms is given its first public performance in Hanover.
- April 9 – Édouard-Léon Scott de Martinville records himself singing "Au Clair de la Lune" – the earliest known intelligible recording of the human voice.
- May 4 – Charles Bacon's bronze statue of the late Felix Mendelssohn is unveiled at Crystal Palace in London.
- September 14 – Franz Liszt makes a will.
- October 22 – The city of Weimar pays tribute to Franz Liszt with a torchlight procession and honorary citizenship.
- The first Viennese operetta, Das Pensionat by Franz von Suppé, is premièred at the Theater an der Wien.
- Richard Wagner essay on "Music of the Future" is first published, in French translation.
- First official National Eisteddfod of Wales is held at Denbigh.

== Published popular music ==
- "Dixie" by Dan Emmett
- "Down Among the Cane-Brakes" by Stephen Foster
- "Kalinka" by Ivan Larionov
- "Lincoln and Liberty" words by Jesse Hutchinson, Jr.
- "Mary Of Argyle" words by Charles Jefferys, music by Sidney Nelson
- "Old Black Joe" by Stephen Foster
- "Virginia Belle" by Stephen Foster
- "When the Corn Is Waving, Annie Dear" by Charles Blamphin
- "I'll Twine 'Mid the Ringlets" words by Maud Irving, music by Joseph Philbrick Webster

== Classical music ==
- Luigi Arditi
  - "Il bacio", vocal waltz dedicated to Marietta Piccolomini with lyrics by Gottardo Aldighieri.
- Johannes Brahms
  - Vier Gesänge, for women's chorus, two horns and harp, Op. 17
  - String Sextet No. 1 in B-flat major, Op. 18
- Karl Davydov – Fantasie über russische Lieder, Op.7
- Eduard Franck
  - Piano Trio No.2 in E♭ major, Op.22
  - Violin Sonata No.2, Op.23
- Louis Moreau Gottschalk – Jeunesse, Op.70
- Franz Liszt – First of the Mephisto Waltzes
- Joseph Mikel – Les lanciers aux bains de mer
- John Knowles Paine – Concert Variations on the Austrian Hymn in F for Organ (Op.3, No.1)
- Anton Rubinstein – Soirées à Saint-Pétersbourg
- Camille Saint-Saëns
  - Symphony No.2, Op.55
  - Ave Maria

== Opera ==
- Gaetano Donizetti – Rita, ou Le mari battu (Posthumously discovered, premiered, and published)
- Flor van Duyse – Teniers te Grimbergen (libretto by Prudens van Duyse; premiered at Ghent)
- Charles Gounod – La colombe; premiered August 3 in Baden-Baden
- Stanislaw Moniuszko – Hrabina, premièred February 7 in Warsaw
- Jacques Offenbach
  - Barkouf
  - Le carnaval des revues

== Musical theater ==
- Orphée Aux Enfers, Vienna production, is the first to include the Orphée aux enfers overture, arranged by Carl Binder.

== Births ==
- January 7 – Emanuil Manolov, Bulgarian composer (d. 1902)
- January 24 – Philippe Bellenot, composer (died 1928)
- March 13 – Hugo Wolf, composer (died 1903)
- May 5 – Pietro Floridia, composer (d. 1932)
- May 17 – August Stradal, pianist (died 1930)
- May 29 – Isaac Albéniz, pianist and composer (d. 1909)
- June 25 – Gustave Charpentier, composer (d. 1956)
- July 7
  - Florence Farr, actress and composer (d. 1917)
  - Gustav Mahler, conductor and composer (d. 1911)
- September 1 – Cleofonte Campanini, conductor (d. 1919)
- September 18 – Alberto Franchetti, opera composer (d. 1942)
- November 18 – Ignacy Jan Paderewski, pianist (d. 1941)
- November 27 – Victor Ewald, composer (d. 1935)
- December 4 – Lillian Russell, US singer and actress (d. 1922)
- December 18 – Edward MacDowell, pianist and composer (d. 1908)
- December 20 – Dan Leno, English music hall comedian, dancer and singer (d. 1904)
- December 24 – Julius Korngold, music critic (died 1945)
- December 28 – Harry B. Smith, US songwriter (d. 1936)
- December 30 – Thomas Bulch, brass-band composer (d. 1930)

== Deaths ==
- January 26 – Wilhelmine Schröder-Devrient, opera singer (b. 1804)
- February 24 – James Barr, composer (born 1779)
- March 6 – Justus Johann Friedrich Dotzauer, French cellist and composer (b. 1783)
- March 14 – Louis Antoine Jullien, conductor and composer (b. 1812)
- May 21 – Johannes Frederik Fröhlich, violinist, conductor and composer (b. 1806)
- June 21 – Mykola Markevych, musician, composer and poet (b. 1804)
- 10 August – Sara Augusta Malmborg, singer, pianist and painter (b. 1810)
- August 26 – Friedrich Silcher, composer (b. 1789)
- September 25 – Carl Friedrich Zöllner, composer and choirmaster (b. 1800)
- November 27 – Ludwig Rellstab, critic (b. 1799)
- date unknown – Veena Kuppayyar, composer of Carnatic music (b. 1798)
