= Foreverly =

Studio album by Billie Joe Armstrong and Norah Jones
- Released: November 25, 2013
- Recorded: 2013
- Studios: Magic Shop, New York City
- Genre: Folk
- Length: 45:23
- Label: Reprise

Billie Joe Armstrong chronology
Foreverly (2013)	No Fun Mondays (2020)

Norah Jones chronology
Covers (2012)	Foreverly (2013)	Day Breaks (2016)

Singles from Foreverly
- 1. "Long Time Gone" Released: October 2013

Foreverly (stylized as foreverly) is a collaborative album by Green Day singer/guitarist Billie Joe Armstrong and jazz/pop singer-songwriter Norah Jones. It was released on November 25, 2013, through Reprise Records.

Foreverly is a collection of traditional songs, and is a reinterpretation of the 1958 album Songs Our Daddy Taught Us by the Everly Brothers. It is promoted by the lead single "Long Time Gone". A lyric video for the song was released on November 13, 2013, and was followed by the release of a music video for "Silver Haired Daddy of Mine" five days later. The album debuted at number 40 on the Billboard 200, and later peaked at number 19 following the death of Phil Everly in January 2014.

== Background ==
In an interview with Stereogum, Armstrong said: "It all started with Stevie Wonder. [laughter] We sang together with Stevie Wonder and his band and a whole bunch of people, that's how Norah and I first met. Then … well, I got into the Everly Brothers' record a couple years ago and I thought it was just beautiful. I was listening to it every morning for a while off and on. I thought it would be cool to remake the record because I thought it was sort of an obscure thing and more people should know about it, but I really wanted to do it with a woman singing because I thought it would take on a different meaning — maybe broaden the meaning a little bit — as compared to hearing the songs being sung by the two brothers. And so my wife said, 'Why don't you get Norah Jones to do it?' and I was like, 'Well, I kinda know her.' Well, I mean, we had Stevie Wonder in common. And so I called her and she said yes. So it was kinda like a … well, I keep saying it was kinda like a blind date."

== Recording ==
In the studio, Jones and Armstrong were joined by bassist Tim Luntzel and drummer Dan Rieser. The recording started with the first song off Songs Our Daddy Taught Us because they "didn't know where else to begin". Asked about singing harmonies together with Armstrong, Jones said: "I feel like on the first song it started coming together. But it definitely took a minute to get super, super comfortable. But then after hearing what the first song sounded like I thought, 'Oh! It's gonna be great, it's gonna be fine.'"

The songs were initially recorded during a five-day session, except for one track that Armstrong and Jones forgot about. After a few weeks the musicians met for another session to record it, and to put the finishing touches on the other tracks. "Personally, I really enjoy doing records in two sessions so you have some room to see how you feel about everything. It was nice to go back and have some room to just kinda re-record a couple of songs that we'd done in the beginning. We figured out which way the record was going at that point and what was missing and so when we re-did those songs we put in what was missing. We just hit it a little harder. I like doing it in two sessions like that", said Norah Jones.

== Critical reception ==
Professional ratings
Aggregate scores
Source	Rating
Metacritic	71/100
Review scores
Source	Rating
AllMusic	3.5/5 stars
Alternative Press	4/5 stars
The A.V. Club	B
Consequence of Sound	D−
The Daily Telegraph	4/5 stars
The Guardian	4/5 stars
Los Angeles Times	3/5 stars
The Observer	3/5 stars
Paste	7.6/10
Rolling Stone	3.5/5 stars

Foreverly received generally positive reviews from music critics. At Metacritic, which assigns a normalized rating out of 100 to reviews from mainstream critics, the album received an average score of 71, based on 22 reviews, indicating "generally favorable reviews". Stephen Thomas Erlewine of AllMusic gave the album three and a half stars out of five, saying "Their approach is not dissimilar to that of Don and Phil in 1958; the brothers didn't scrupulously re-create the sound of the past, they sang the songs in a way that was true to them, which is precisely what Billie Joe and Norah do here. They're a good match. Jones' suppleness sands down Armstrong's ragged voice, he gives her grit while she lends him grace, and these qualities are evident throughout this lovely little gem of an album." Marah Eakin of The A.V. Club gave the album a B, saying "As it is, Foreverly is a smart, lovely tribute LP. It might seem initially unlikely that Armstrong and Jones have as much rootsy connection to the music (and to the state of Kentucky) that Don and Phil Everly do, yet after listening to Foreverly, it's not hard to believe that maybe somewhere deep down they could."

Phil Mongredien of The Observer gave the album three out of five stars, saying "While hardly a move into brave new musical pastures, it's not without charm and the use of a female voice puts just enough distance between this and the original, the entwining harmonies recalling Gram Parsons's duets with Emmylou Harris. The highlight comes when Jones takes the lead on Rockin' Alone." Mark Lore of Paste gave the album 7.6 out of 10, saying "No doubt Foreverly will steer a few more listeners to Songs Our Daddy Taught Us. A good thing. And you can't help but think the experience will also steer Armstrong and Jones forward in their respective careers. That can't be a bad thing, either." Will Hermes of Rolling Stone gave the album three and a half stars out of five, saying "Just when you thought Green Day's Billie Joe Armstrong couldn't commit a worse punk heresy than doing a Broadway musical, boo-yah! Here's a set of folk duets with the velvet-voiced Norah Jones. The year's second fine left-field, all-Everly Brothers LP (see Bonnie "Prince" Billy and Dawn McCarthy's What the Brothers Sang) remakes the 1958 Songs Our Daddy Taught Us LP with spot-on harmonies and playful retro arrangements."

Robert Ham of Alternative Press gave the album four out of five stars, saying "To add even more praise to the folks behind Foreverly, whomever it was at Reprise that decided to schedule this for a late fall/early winter release deserves some credit as well. Foreverly feels custom made for long walks through leaf-strewn streets or a brisk dark evening at home. The warm spirit that emanates from this loving tribute should be more than enough to keep you cozy through the cold months ahead." Zach Schonfeld of Consequence of Sound gave the album two out of five stars, saying "Mediocre on every count, the resulting set of tracks won't change anyone's mind about any of the artists involved (that's presuming it won't make you like the Everlys less), but as a fleeting curiosity, it's precisely what it says it is — with little imagination to spare."

== Commercial performance ==
The album debuted at number 40 on the Billboard 200 chart, with first-week sales of 18,120 copies in the United States. Following the death of Phil Everly on January 3, 2014, the album climbed to number 19 on the Billboard 200 chart in January 2014.

== Track listing ==
No.	Title	Writer(s)	Length
1.	"Roving Gambler"	traditional	4:08
2.	"Long Time Gone"	Frank Hartford, Tex Ritter, traditional	3:28
3.	"Lightning Express"	Bradley Kincaid	5:00
4.	"Silver Haired Daddy of Mine"	Gene Autry, Jimmy Long	3:15
5.	"Down in the Willow Garden"	Charlie Monroe, traditional	4:32
6.	"Who's Gonna Shoe Your Pretty Little Feet?"	traditional	2:56
7.	"Oh So Many Years"	Frankie Bailes	3:03
8.	"Barbara Allen"	traditional, Susan Urban	4:48
9.	"Rockin' Alone (In an Old Rockin' Chair)"	Bob Miller	3:00
10.	"I'm Here to Get My Baby Out of Jail"	Karl Davis, Harty Taylor	4:19
11.	"Kentucky"	Karl Davis	3:26
12.	"Put My Little Shoes Away"	Samuel N. Mitchell, Charles E. Pratt	3:28

== Personnel ==
Musicians

- Billie Joe Armstrong – vocals, electric guitar, acoustic guitar, pump organ
- Norah Jones – vocals, electric guitar, acoustic guitar, 6 string banjo, chimes, pump organ, piano
- Tim Luntzel – bass
- Dan Rieser – drums, percussion
- Charlie Burnham – violin, mandolin, harmonica
- Jonny Lam – pedal-steel guitar

Technical personnel

- Chris Dugan – engineering and mixing
- Kabir Hermon – assistant engineer
- Greg Calbi – mastering
- Chris Bellman – vinyl mastering

== Charts ==
=== Weekly charts ===
Chart (2013–14)	Peak position
Austrian Albums (Ö3 Austria)	29
Belgian Albums (Ultratop Flanders)	50
Belgian Albums (Ultratop Wallonia)	69
Canadian Albums (Billboard)	19
Croatian International Albums (HDU)	3
Danish Albums (Hitlisten)	40
Dutch Albums (Album Top 100)	80
French Albums (SNEP)	176
German Albums (Offizielle Top 100)	77
Irish Albums (IRMA)	37
Italian Albums (FIMI)	48
Scottish Albums (Official Charts)	57
Spanish Albums (Promusicae)	62
Swiss Albums (Schweizer Hitparade)	16
UK Albums (Official Charts)	63
US Billboard 200	19
US Top Rock Albums (Billboard)	4
US Indie Store Album Sales (Billboard)	2

=== Year-end charts ===
Chart (2014)	Position
US Billboard 200	172
US Top Rock Albums (Billboard)	37

== Release history ==
Region	Date	Format	Label
United States	November 25, 2013	CD, digital download	Reprise Records
United States	December 10, 2013	Cassette	Reprise Records
United States	January 24, 2014	Vinyl	Reprise Records
