= Henry Thornton Craven =

English actor and playwright (1818–1905)

- Born: Henry Thornton; 26 February 1818; Poland Street, Soho, London, England
- Died: 13 April 1905 (aged 87); Thorntonville, Clapham Park, London, England
- Spouse: Eliza Nelson (m. 1852)
- Children: 4
- Relatives: Sidney Nelson (father-in-law); Effie Adelaide Rowlands (niece); Meggie Albanesi (great-niece); May Hallatt (great-niece)

Henry Thornton Craven (né Henry Thornton; 26 February 1818 – 13 April 1905) was an English actor and dramatist.

== Early life and career ==
Craven was born Henry Thornton in 26 February 1818 in Poland Street, Soho to Robert Thornton, a teacher in Holborn, and Mary Thornton (née Sanderson). Starting life as a publisher's clerk in Paternoster Row, he subsequently acted as amanuensis to Edward Bulwer-Lytton, and began writing for Bentley's Miscellany. Ambitious to become a dramatist, he took to the stage, making his first appearance at York in 1840 and his London debut soon after at Fanny Kelly's Theatre in Soho.

In 1841 he was acting on the Sunderland circuit, and in 1842 his first play, Bertram the Avenger, was produced at North Shields. Craven produced his second play, Miserrimus, at Portsmouth late in 1843. In the spring of 1844 he joined Robert Keeley and Mary Anne Keeley at the Lyceum Theatre, London, and after both acting and writing for the stage of the smaller theatres he was in 1850 engaged at Theatre Royal, Drury Lane, where, on the occasion of William Macready's farewell in February 1851, he played Malcolm to the tragedian's Macbeth.

On 12 June of that year his operetta The Village Nightingale was produced at the Strand Theatre, with himself in one of the characters. Eliza Nelson (1827–1908), daughter of the composer Sidney Nelson, took the leading female role. In November 1851 the two were engaged by Lloyd of Edinburgh for the Theatre Royal company, Craven as principal stage director. In that city they were married on 12 May 1852.

== Australia, and success as a dramatist ==
In June 1854 the Cravens left for Australia. In Sydney they fulfilled a successful engagement at the Royal Victoria Theatre. In partnership with the actor W. H. Stephens, Craven then refurbished the little (over 1,000 seats) Lyceum theatre in the same city, which as "Our Lyceum" opened in 1855. In April 1857 the Cravens appeared at the Theatre Royal, Melbourne, in several of Craven's own pieces.

On their return to England, Eliza withdrew from performing, while Craven continued to write and perform. The Post Boy was first seen at the Strand Theatre on 31 October 1860. Frederick Robson produced and played in Craven's domestic drama The Chimney Corner at the Olympic Theatre, opening on 21 February 1861. Miriam's Crime opened at the Strand Theatre on 9 October 1863. These plays were successful.

== Milky White ==
Craven designed for Robson the title-character in Milky White, which was first produced at the Prince of Wales's Theatre, Liverpool, opening on 20 June 1864. Robson's sudden death in August altered Craven's plans, and he himself sustained the title-role when the piece was brought out at the Strand on 28 September of that year. Milky White enjoyed a run and a revival at the Strand and was subsequently popular in the provinces.

"The author", remarked The Daily Telegraph (29 September 1864), "has not only to be congratulated on the literary power and constructive skill with which he has worked out an exceedingly original idea, but he has also to be complimented on the cleverness with which he has embodied the effective character who is the hero of the story so happily imagined. Already well known as a dramatist. . . his histrionic achievements have, in this country at least, scarcely been considered as prominently associated with his name. . . . It would be difficult to name any comedian who could have more thoroughly realized the part. . . . The writing abounds in quaint turns of expression, some of them so daringly tipped with verbal flippancies that the serious situations are occasionally endangered by their utterance. . . ."

== Later career ==
In the dual role of actor and dramatist Craven scored again at the New Royalty on 17 October 1866, when Meg's Diversion opened, with himself as Jasper, the play running 330 nights. In 1873 he made his last provincial tour. His last play Too True, an historical drama, was produced at the Duke's, opening on 22 January 1876, and in this he made his final appearance on the stage.

Many of his numerous plays were published by Duncombe, Lacy, and French. In 1876 he published a novel, The Old Tune.

He was described in 1880: "Mr Craven is a genuine humorist, and contrives to blend the pathetic and comic sides of human nature in a manner that places him in the front rank of living actors. Since Mr Robson, whose style Mr Craven recalls, no English actor has equalled him in presenting beneath a droll exterior underlying touches of subtle pathos."

Craven died at his home Thorntonville in Clapham Park, on 13 April 1905, and his widow in Eastbourne on 20 March 1908. Both were buried in Norwood Cemetery. Two of their four children survived them, a daughter and a son, Tom Sidney Craven, who became a dramatist and actor.
