= Rose Massey =

English actress

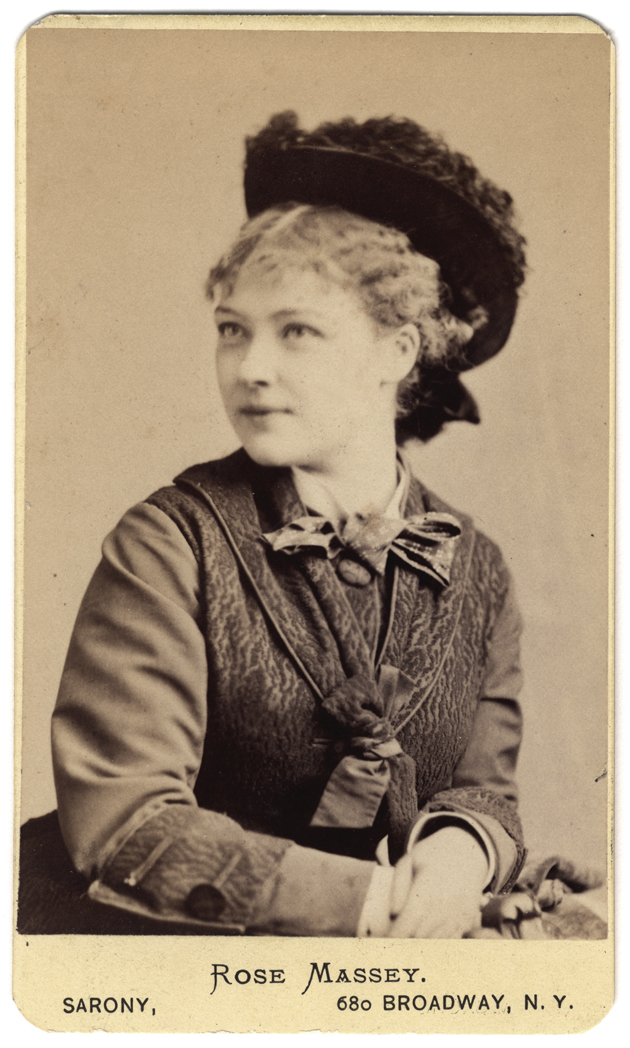
- Born: Rose Mary Massey c. 1845; England
- Died: 23 July 1883 (aged 37–38); New York City, US
- Burial place: Green-Wood Cemetery, Brooklyn
- Occupation: Actress
- Children: Blanche Massey

Rose Massey (1845 in England – 23 July 1883 in New York City) was a 19th-century British stage actress. She was the mother of the actress Blanche Massey.

== Biography ==
Rose Mary Massey was born in 1845 in England, daughter of Mary and Robert Massey.

Massey first appeared at the Haymarket Theatre in London in July 1867, playing the role of Mary Meredith in Our American Cousin. Massey had a relationship with the theatrical manager, proprietor and promoter Alexander Henderson (father of writer Effie Adelaide Rowlands and later spouse of burlesque producer Lydia Thompson). That relationship produced a daughter, Ellen Blanche Massey (1868-1929), also an actress.

Her New York debut was in February 1869, in The Field of the Cloth of Gold at Wood's Museum, but later gained attention in her 1871 performance as Fatima in Blue Beard at the Covent Garden Theatre.

Massey played a number of roles opposite actor Henry James Montague, whom she followed to the United States and later sued in 1875 for breach of promise to marry. She claimed to have a son fathered by Montague, and it made a stir when Massey also released "sappy" letters to her from Montague. That case ended, however, when Montague died in 1878.

Massey died of consumption in New York on 23 July 1883 and is buried at Green-Wood Cemetery in Brooklyn.
