= Forty Thieves =

Forty Thieves or 40 Thieves most often refers to the characters in the story of Ali Baba and the Forty Thieves.

It may also refer to:

== Groups of people ==
- Forty Thieves (New York gang), an 18th-century New York street gang
- Forty Thieves (New York City Common Council 1852–1853)
- Forty Elephants, also known as the Forty Thieves, an all-female London criminal gang specializing in shoplifting
- The nickname for the participants in the 1921 Cairo Conference

== Theatre, film and television ==
- The Forty Thieves, an 1878 British pantomime version of the Ali Baba story
- The Forty Thieves (1869 play), a burlesque performed on Broadway
- Forty Thieves (film), a 1944 Hopalong Cassidy Western

== Other uses ==
- Forty Thieves (card game), another name for the solitaire game Napoleon at St Helena
- Vengeur-class ships of the line, whose notoriously poor construction caused them to become known as the "forty thieves."
- "40 Thieves" (A Loss for Words song)
