= Lisa Weber =

English actress

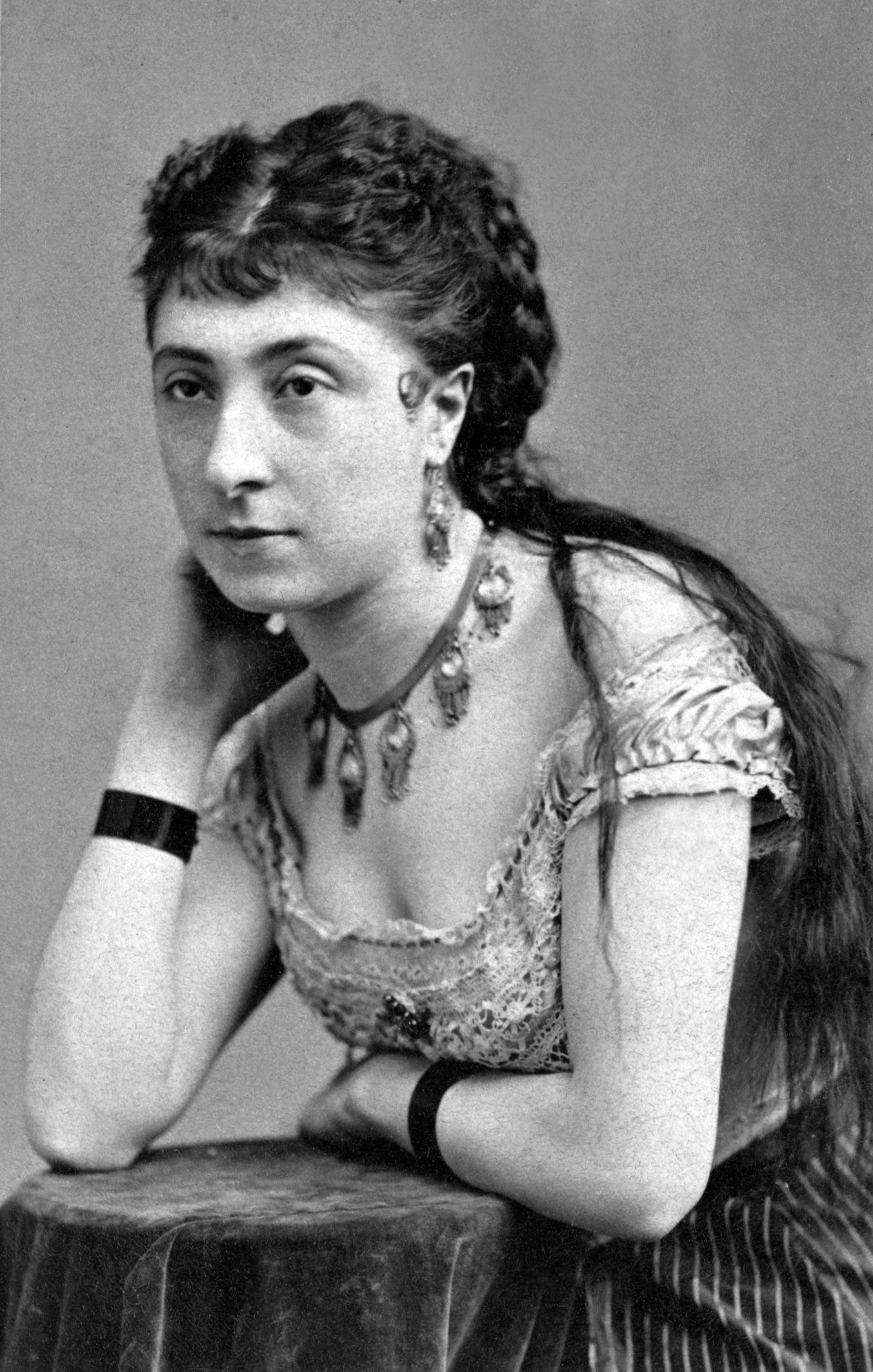
- Lisa Weber (photo by Jeremiah Gurney)
- Born: 1844? England
- Died: 24 October 1887; Buffalo, New York
- Occupations: Actress; dancer; singer

Lisa Weber (c. 1844 – 24 October 1887) was a 19th-century English actress who performed in America with Lydia Thompson's burlesque troupe, and was one of Thompson's "British Blondes".

Thompson recruited Weber from Covent Garden. She first appeared in America in the role of Mercury in Ixion when Thompson came to America in September 1868, followed by Ernani and Forty Thieves. Weber's performance of Walking Down Broadway by Charles E. Pratt and William Lingard in Ixion was a hit.

Said to be the best vocalist of the troupe, Weber was also the first to "spin-off", returning to England in June 1869 to recruit her own troupe, which debuted at Wood's Museum in New York in January 1870 and travelled as well. She married W.S. Mullaly in 1871, a musical and minstrel director. She divorced him in 1875 and later married Robert Britton. In 1878 she returned for a time to England and appeared as Mazeppa at Astley's.

Weber's fortunes declined over time. The general reports were that had gained weight over time and faded from the limelight. See performed in and managed lesser touring burlesque companies, also at times doing some minstrel and vaudeville work. From October 1885 until her death in 1887, she would travel by herself and join with local talent to organise shows.

Weber died in Buffalo, New York, on 24 October 1887, where she had been performing. She was buried in Forest Lawn Cemetery in that city.
