= Charles E. Pratt =

American composer

Charles E. Pratt (1841 – August 11, 1902) was an American composer of popular music in the 1860s through 1890s, musician, and band leader.

== Biography ==
In 1873, with lyricist Samuel N. Mitchell, he published Put My Little Shoes Away, which has endured as a popular song among bluegrass performers. In 1881, under the duo of pseudonyms H.J. Fulmer and J.T. Wood, Pratt published the popular "Bring Back My Bonnie To Me" (a.k.a. My Bonnie Lies over the Ocean), which is said to be an adaptation of a traditional Scottish folk song. Theodore Raph in his 1964 book American song treasury: 100 favorites, writes that people were requesting the song at sheet music stores in the 1870s, and Pratt was convinced to publish a version of it under the pseudonyms, and the song became a big hit, especially popular with college singing groups but also popular for all group singing situations.

As a musician and orchestra leader, Pratt worked with artists including Emma Abbott (serving as her manager for a time), Emma Thursby, Anna Bishop, Robert Heller, Alice Dunning Lingard, Ema Pukšec (Ilma de Murska), and Clara Louise Kellogg.

Pratt was born in Hartford, Connecticut in 1841 and died in New York City in 1902 of Bright's disease.

== Notable songs ==
- Walking Down Broadway (1868) (lyrics by William Lingard, made popular by Lisa Weber in Ixion)
- Angels Rock My Babe to Sleep (1873)
- Put My Little Shoes Away (1873) (lyrics by Samuel N. Mitchell)
- Deck My Grave with Violets Blue (1878) (lyrics by John Keynton)
- Lovely Mercedes, Where Art Thou Flown? (1878) (lyrics by C. Curtis) (for the death of Mercedes of Orléans)
- When Jamie comes over the sea! (1879)(lyrics by John Keynton)
- Bring Back My Bonnie To Me (1881) (lyrics by "J.T. Wood", composed by "H.J. Fulmer")
- Bonnie Blue-Eyed Bessie (1887) (lyrics by John Keynton)
- Don't Go Out Tonight, Boy (1895) (lyrics by George Cooper)
