= Sidney Nelson =

English composer (1800–1862)

- Born: 1 January 1800; London, England
- Died: 7 April 1862 (aged 62); Russell Square, London, England
- Spouse: Sarah Nelson
- Children: 6
- Relatives: Henry Thornton Craven (son-in-law); Effie Adelaide Rowlands (granddaughter); Meggie Albanesi (great-granddaughter); May Hallatt (great-granddaughter)

Sidney Nelson (1 January 1800 – 7 April 1862) was an English composer, songwriter, pianist, actor and music publisher, known for the "Rose of Allendale" and "Mary of Argyle".

== Life ==
Nelson was born 1 January 1800 in London to Solomon Nelson. Showing musical ability when quite young, he was adopted by a gentleman who gave him a good musical and general education. He was for some time a pupil of Sir George Smart, and eventually became a teacher in London. He was in partnership with Charles Jefferys as a music-seller until 1843, when he was elected an associate of the Philharmonic Society. Subsequently he became a music publisher, but, being unsuccessful, he arranged a musical and dramatic entertainment with members of his family, and went on tour in North America, Canada, and Australia.

Nelson was active in Australia from 1852 to around 1859.

== Compositions ==
Nelson was a prolific composer, and claimed to have written about eight hundred pieces, some of which were published under an assumed name. He composed a burletta, The Grenadier, produced by Madame Vestris at the Olympic Theatre; The Cadi's Daughter, performed after Macbeth for William Macready's farewell benefit; and The Village Nightingale, words by Henry Thornton Craven, his son-in-law. He had a grand opera, Ulrica, in rehearsal at the Princess's Theatre, London under John Medex Maddox's management, but, owing to some dispute, it was not produced.

He was the author of Instructions in the Art of Singing and composed many duets, trios, piano pieces, and songs; some of the latter, such as "The Pilot" and "Rose of Allendale", attained considerable popularity. "Mary of Argyle" also became popular.

== Personal life ==
Nelson was married to Sarah Nelson (c. 1809–1880). The couple had at least 6 children, including:

- Eliza Nelson (c. 1827–1908), actress, musician and vocalist; married the actor Henry Thornton Craven
- Alfred Nelson (c. 1830–1894), vocalist, actor and elocution teacher
- Marie Nelson (c. 1833 – c. 1834–1913), actress and singer who performed under the name Marie Sidney; common-law marriage to the theatre manager Alexander Henderson (1828–1886)
- Carry Nelson (1836–1916), vocalist and actress
- Sara Nelson (1839–1913), vocalist
- Alexander Nelson, vocalist

Through his daughter Marie, Nelson was the grandfather of the novelist Effie Adelaide Rowlands and the great-grandfather of the actresses Meggie Albanesi and May Hallatt.

On 7 April 1862, Nelson died in Russell Square, London aged 62. He was buried at West Ham.
