= Austin Henry Williams =

Brigadier Austin Henry Williams (11 February 1890 – 5 September 1973) was a British polo champion and officer in the Indian Army.

He was born in Felsted in Essex, England. He was educated at Felsted School and the Royal Military College, Sandhurst, from where he was commissioned a second lieutenant on the Unattached List for the Indian Army on 8 September 1909. After a year attached to a British regiment he was appointed to the Indian Army and the 38th Central India Horse on 4 December 1910. He was promoted to lieutenant on 8 December 1911. He married Gwladys Mary Gosset, in 1911. They had a son, David Philip Hugh Tudor-Williams in 1922. They divorced in 1927.

In August 1914 he was on leave in England and rejoined his regiment in the field in France in early January 1915. He served with his regiment in France and Palestine, being appointed adjutant in April 1916 and promoted captain in July 1916, until he was sent back to India in August 1918.

He was awarded the Military Cross as recorded in the London Gazette of 1 January 1919.

When the 38th & 39th Central India Horse were amalgamated in 1921 to form the 21st Central India Horse he was again appointed adjutant. He was promoted to major on 9 September 1925. Before his transfer to the 16th Light Cavalry in 1933 at various times he served as an instructor at the Equitation School at Saugor and military advisor to Jodhpur State.

He participated in the 1927 International Polo Cup. He was appointed a Squadron Commander in the 21st Central India Horse on 15 April 1931.

He transferred to the 16th Light Cavalry as the second in command on 9 April 1933, and was promoted to lieutenant-colonel and appointed commanding officer on 31 October 1934, a position he held until 30 October 1938.

He was appointed officiating commandant of the Equitation School at Saugor as of 25 October 1938, then promoted to colonel and appointed commandant on 25 January 1939, a position he held until 31 August 1939 when the school was closed. He went on to be the commandant of the Small Arms School India at Saugor from November 1939 until he retired. He had been promoted to acting brigadier on 21 August 1941 and temporary brigadier on 21 February 1942.

He was an ADC to the King from 6 April 1943 to 4 September 1944, appointed a Commander of the Order of the Indian Empire in 1944 and retired a colonel with the honorary rank of brigadier on 4 September 1944.

He moved to South Africa in 1948 with his wife Eva Albanesi (daughter of composer Carlo Albanesi and novelist Effie Rowlands) whom he had married in 1927. There was a daughter (Meg Hartman) and four grandchildren. He died on 5 September 1973 in Port Elizabeth in South Africa.
