= That Silver Haired Daddy of Mine =

1931 song by Gene Autry and Jimmy Long

Single by Gene Autry and Jimmy Long
- B-side: "Mississippi Valley Blues"
- Written: 1930
- Published: Copyright March 6, 1931 by Jimmy Long, renewed 1958. Published 1932 by M. M. Cole Publishing Co., Chicago.
- Released: January 1932 (as "Silver Haired Daddy of Mine")
- Recorded: October 29, 1931
- Studio: ARC Studios, New York City
- Genre: Country (hillbilly)
- Label: Perfect 12775
- Songwriter(s): Gene Autry, Jimmy Long

"That Silver Haired Daddy of Mine" was Gene Autry's first hit record in 1932, written and performed with fellow railroadman Jimmy Long. Thanks to his new career as a singing cowboy in 1935, it became one of his biggest hits as a singer.

== Writing and recording ==
Jimmy Long was Gene Autry's brother-in-law and business manager, and it appears that he wrote most, if not all, of "That Silver Haired Daddy of Mine". On December 2, 1930, he recorded an almost-finished version with Cliff Keiser, at Gennett Studios, Richmond, Indiana, released as Champion 16190 He filed a copyright on March 6, 1931, and it passed to his children when he died. On October 29, 1931, Long and Autry shared lead vocals, recording their version at ARC Studios, New York City. The record was released on several labels in January 1932, with the pair sharing performing and writing credits. It was also published by M. M. Cole Publishing Co., with both listed as songwriters.

== Success ==
The record was a hit, but it wasn't until 1935, when Autry performed the song in two movies (the science-fiction/western 12-part serial The Phantom Empire in February and Tumbling Tumbleweeds in September), that sales of a Vocalion re-release really took off, selling a reported five million copies. This number may not be totally accurate, but the record was certified gold by the RIAA in 1958.

== Lyrics ==
The lyrics are addressed to the elderly father of the narrator, who wishes to repay his father for all the effort expended in raising him. This could be Jimmy Long reaching out to his own father, since all the words were written before Gene got involved.

== Other recordings ==
According to the database of secondhandsongs.com, "That Silver Haired Daddy of Mine" has been covered over 50 times. It was covered by the Everly Brothers on their 1958 album Songs Our Daddy Taught Us and by Simon & Garfunkel on their albums Old Friends and Live 1969. Billie Joe Armstrong also did a cover of the song, in tribute to the Everly Brothers, as a track on a 2013 album called Foreverly.

== In popular culture ==
On the children's show Sesame Street, Herry Monster sings a song called "Furry Blue Mommy of Mine", which shows just how much he appreciates and loves his mother. This song is a parody of "That Silver-Haired Daddy of Mine".
