= Norman Fraser =

Chilean-born English composer and pianist

Norman George Fraser (26 November 1904–1986) was a Chilean-born English pianist and composer.

== Early life and education ==
Fraser was born in Valparaiso in Chile of Scottish and Spanish parents. He studied music in Chili and Lausanne, Switzerland before moving to England in 1917 to study at the Royal Academy of Music with Carlo Albanesi, taking additional piano lessons with Isidor Philipp in Paris. He then returned to England to study piano with Tobias Matthay for three years, and established himself as a concert pianist and teacher.

== Career and personal life ==
Fraser was employed by the BBC from 1935 to 1943, where he was a programmer for the Latin American Service. He toured South America as a representative of the British Council, and from 1945 gave joint recitals with his wife, the Scottish mezzo-soprano Janet Fraser (née Janet Smith-Miller, 1911-????). From 1954 until his retirement in 1967 he re-joined the BBC as its European music supervisor. His address in the 1960s was Stangrove House, Edenbridge in Kent. In 1973 he settled at Seaford in East Sussex.

=== Composing and writing ===
Fraser's compositions include the four orchestral Chilean Dances, the Rondo Campesino for soprano and orchestra, a string quartet (1923), and piano (including a piano sonata), songs and chamber works (such as the Cueca for two violins and piano). Fraser was also the editor of the International Catalogue of Recorded Folk Music (1954), and a contributor to the Fifth Edition of Grove's Dictionary of Music.
