= The Gold Express =

1955 British film by Guy Fergusson

- Theatrical release poster
- Directed by: Guy Fergusson
- Screenplay by: Jackson Budd
- Produced by: Frank Wells
- Starring: Vernon Gray; Ann Walford; May Hallatt
- Cinematography: Frank North
- Edited by: Derek Hyde-Chambers
- Music by: Jack Beaver
- Production company: Gaumont-British Picture Corporation
- Release date: 1955
- Running time: 62 minutes
- Country: United Kingdom
- Language: English

The Gold Express is a 1955 British second feature ('B') comedy-drama film directed by Guy Fergusson, and starring Vernon Gray, Ann Walford and May Hallatt. It was written by Jackson Budd based on his 1947 novel of the same title.

== Plot ==
Newspaper reporter Bob Wright must abandon his honeymoon and return to London with his wife Mary, also a journalist, on a train carrying a shipment of gold. Mr Rover, a crook, is also aboard the train, planning to steal the gold. But so is Pearl, who is out to seek revenge against Rover for a previous double-crossing he inflicted upon her. Wright foils Rover's plans with the assistance of his fellow-passengers, but Mary gets the scoop story.

== Cast ==
- Vernon Gray as Bob Wright
- Ann Walford as Mary Wright
- May Hallatt as Agatha Merton
- Ivy St. Helier as Emma Merton
- Patrick Boxill as Mr. Rover
- Charles Rolfe as George Phillips
- John Serret as Luke Dubois
- Delphi Lawrence as Pearl
- Delene Scott as Emmeline

== Production ==
Director Guy Fergusson was switched to another project during the making of the film, and replaced by Colin Bell, who is credited in the film with "additional sequences".

== Reception ==
The Monthly Film Bulletin wrote: "Apart from rather engaging performances by Ivy St. Helier and May Hallatt, as the thriller-writing sisters, this is a 'B' picture well below the average. The story is generally deficient in pace and tension, and shots of the train going through stations are too often repeated, as though it were necessary to remind us of where the action is taking place."

Kine Weekly wrote: "The picture is a muddled affair, and dark photography, obviously intended to heighten atmosphere, further complicates story develpment. Old-timers May Hallatt and Ivy St Helier amuse as Agatha and Emma, but they are the only players who honestly work their passage. The less said of the rest and the direction the better."

The Daily Film Renter wrote: "One has to swallow some very familiar, rather dated, clichés about Fleet Street. After that all is plain sailing in an efficiently-made, modest-budget offering which combines smiles with action. The acting of Vernon Gray as a star reporter carries the picture along breezily throughout its conveniently crisp length, while Ann Walford acquits herself agreeably.
