= Carlo Albanesi =

Italian composer and pianist

Carlo Albanesi (22 October 1858 – 26 September 1926) was an Italian-born composer, pianist, teacher and examiner who spent most of his working life in England. His Exercises for Fingering, first published in the early 1900s, are still in use today.

== Life and career ==
Born in Naples, Albanesi received piano lessons from his father, the piano virtuoso Luigi Albanesi (1821–1898), and composition lessons from Sabino Falconi.

He established himself in Italy as a pianist before moving to Paris as a recitalist in 1878. From 1882 he settled in London, where he composed and performed widely for the next ten years. In 1893 he was appointed professor of piano at the Royal Academy of Music, succeeding the deceased Thomas Wingham. He remained there until his death. Albanesi was appointed Chevalier of the Crown of Italy, and was a long-term member of the London Philharmonic Society. He was also an examiner at the Dublin Royal Academy of Music.

His pupils included Crown Princess of Sweden and her sister, Princess Patricia of Connaught, the Duchess Marie of Saxe-Coburg and the Duchess Paul of Mecklenburgh, as well as the English composer Mary Lucas, the Scottish pianist Lilias Mackinnon, Welsh composer and pianist Meirion Williams and the Chilean composer, pianist and writer Norman Fraser. The Royal Academy of Music established a Carlo Albanesi prize for Chopin performance.

== Composer ==
As a composer Albanesi wrote orchestral and chamber music, including a string quartet and trio for piano and strings. But he is best remembered for his piano music and particularly the six piano sonatas, the last of which was composed in 1907. Of those, Number 4 in B♭ minor (1905), with a graceful Barcarolle as its middle movement, achieved the most popularity. A five movement suite for piano, Ritmi di danze antiche, op. 60, was published by Augener in 1897. Albanesi also wrote for amateurs, as in the suite Thoughts in Pastels, which was published by Bosworth's. His Exercises for Fingering have remained in print.

Phillip Sear has detected in his piano music the influence of his Neopolitan near contemporary Paolo Tosti, who also taught at the Royal Academy of Music.

== Personal life ==
In 1896 Albanesi married the Australian born, British novelist Effie Adelaide Rowlands. They lived at 3 Gloucester Terrace in Hyde Park, and had two daughters: Eva Olimpia Maria Albanesi (1897-????), and Margherita Cecilia Brigida Lucia Maria Albanesi (better known as the actress Meggie Albanesi) (1899–1923). Eva married a military man, Austin Henry Williams, in 1927 and they moved to South Africa in 1948. Carlo Albanesi died at home following a short illness and was buried at St Pancras Cemetery, Finchley.
