= Charles Rolfe =

British actor (1890–1965)

- in 49th Parallel (1941)
- Born: Charles John Rolfe; 30 January 1890; London, England
- Died: 8 July 1965 (aged 75); Hampton Wick, Surrey, England
- Occupation: Actor
- Years active: 1933–1962 (film)

Charles Rolfe (1890–1965) was a British stage, film and television actor. One of his most notable roles was in the 1941 wartime thriller Tower of Terror.

== Selected filmography ==
- Tower of Terror (1941)
- The Man at the Gate (1941)
- 49th Parallel (1941)
- Hard Steel (1942)
- Meet Sexton Blake! (1945)
- The Voice Within (1946)
- The Man Within (1947)
- Dear Murderer (1947)
- You Lucky People! (1955)
- The Gold Express (1955)

== Bibliography ==
- Michael F. Keaney. British Film Noir Guide. McFarland, 2008. ISBN 978-0-7864-3805-1
