= Blanche Massey =

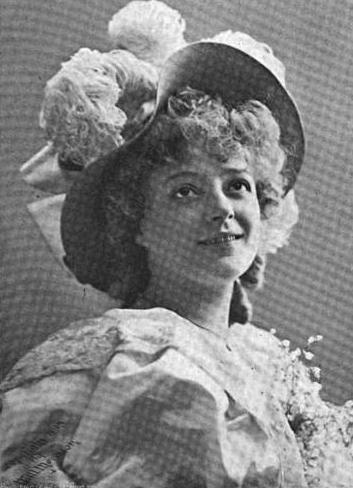
Blanche Massey

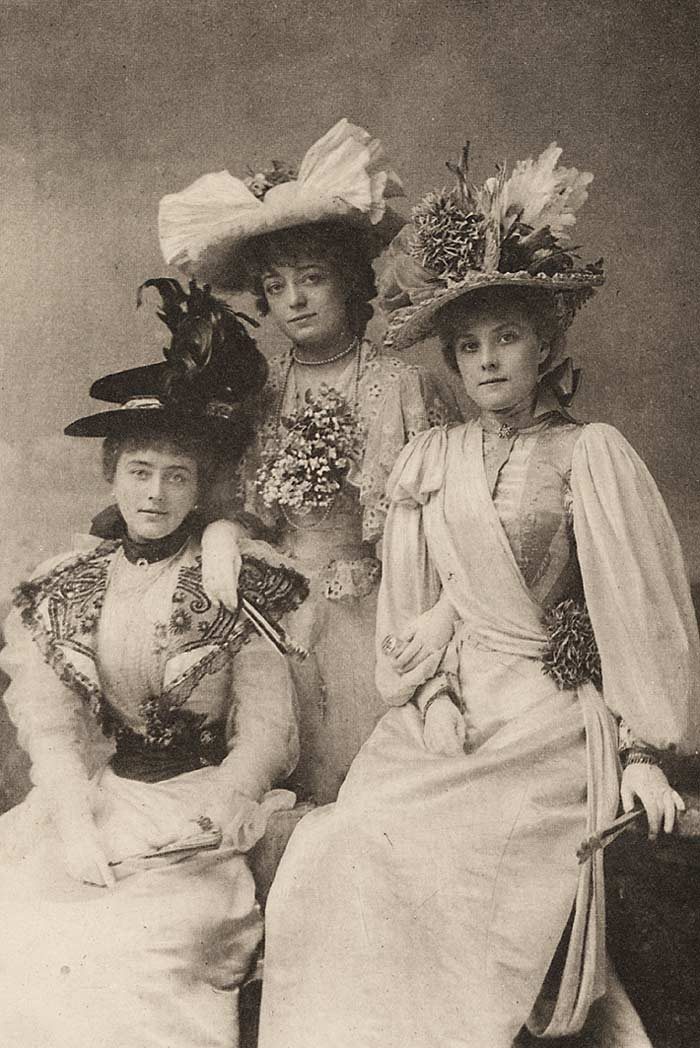
Massey (at center) in The Geisha (1896)

Ellen Mary Blanche Henderson Massey (16 April 1868 – 27 September 1929) was a British actress and singer. A Gaiety Girl, she was best known for her stage appearances in London and the United States in the 1890s. Among her appearances in many productions with the George Edwardes company, especially in Edwardian musical comedies, she was perhaps most remembered for A Gaiety Girl.

== Life and career ==
Massey was born on 16 April 1868 in Northumberland, the daughter of Rose Massey, a well-known actress in her time, who died of consumption in 1883. Her father, who was not married to her mother, was the theatrical manager and artist agent Alexander Henderson, also the father of her half-sister Effie Adelaide Rowlands; he was later married to Lydia Thompson.

Massey appeared in plays, Victorian burlesques and Edwardian musical comedies as A Run of Luck (1888), Ruy Blas and the Blasé Roué (1889) (incorrectly listed as Blanche Massie), Carmen up to Data (1890), Cinder Ellen up too Late (1891), The Geisha (1896), My Friend the Prince (1897), and Lady Madcap (1904).

She appeared in both the 1893 West End production of A Gaiety Girl and also the 1894 Broadway production, playing Alma Somerset, the title role, in the latter. The New York Times reviewer wrote, after its Broadway debut in September 1894, that "Blanche Massey is only to be looked at, and few persons will ever tire of looking at her."

Massey married George F. Tully (1876–1930), an Irish-born actor, who appeared in a few silent films in the 1910s.

She died at age 61, on 27 September 1929.
