= Michael B. Leavitt =

American theater entrepreneur, manager and producer (1843–1935)

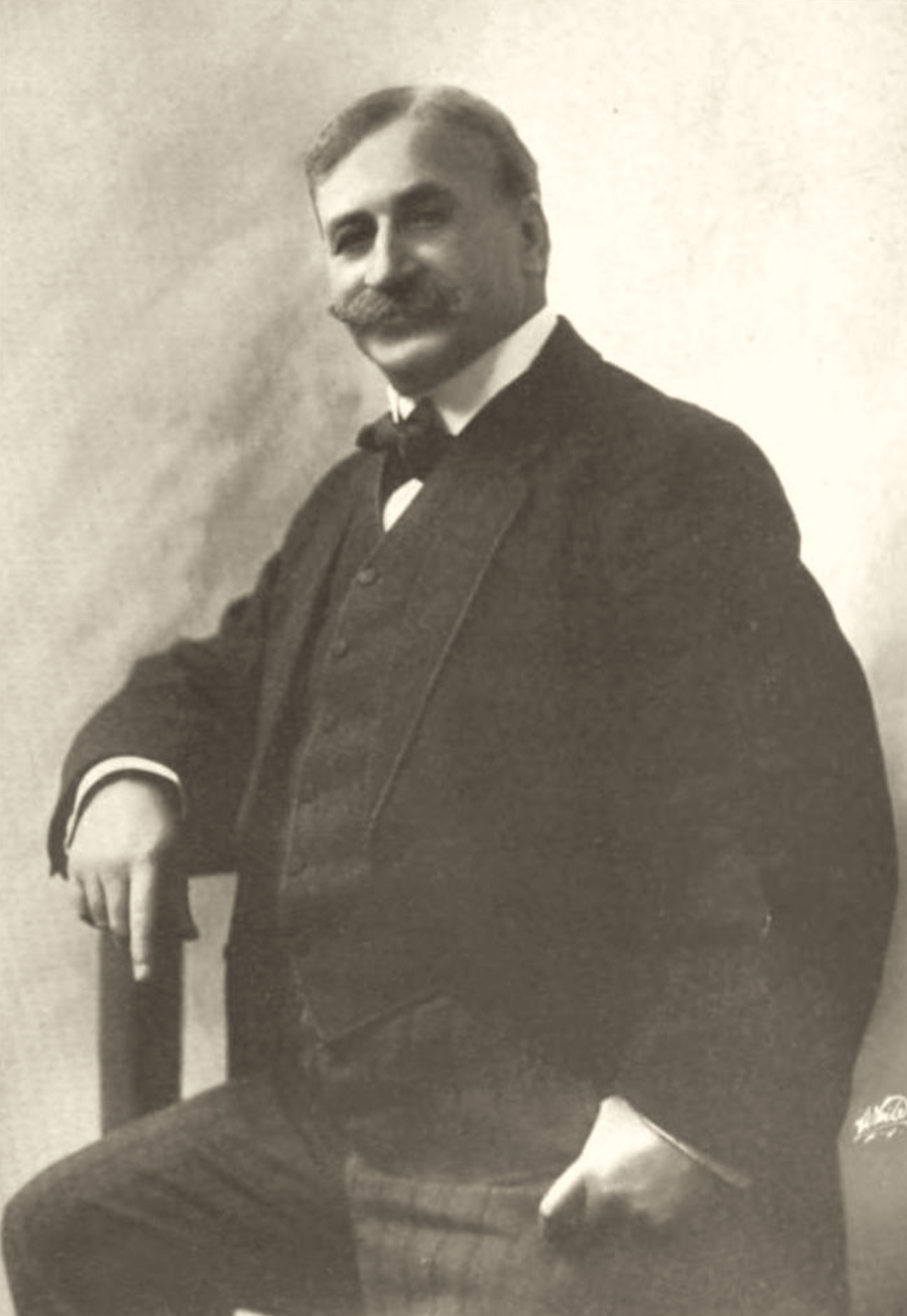
Michael B. Leavitt

Michael Bennett Leavitt (1843–1935) was an American theater entrepreneur, manager, and producer. He entered show business as a blackface minstrel show singer. By the 1860s, Leavitt had made the leap to management and, following the precedent set by others, was touring variety show troupes in rural areas, billing them as authentic city entertainment. By 1870, Leavitt had made a name in the theater industry by importing acts to North America from Europe. Leavitt's companies toured both the United States and Mexico; he had a corner on the best theaters in the latter. He sometimes worked in partnership with his brother, Abraham Leavitt. Acts he managed include magicians Alexander Herrmann and Harry Kellar.

In his memoirs, Leavitt claimed to have made several innovations in American show business. For example, he credited himself with the introduction of lithographic theater posters to the United States in 1872 after he had brought some back from Europe. By the end of the 1870s, lithographic printing had begun to supplant block printing for theater advertising. Leavitt claimed that in the late 1870s, his six to eight touring burlesque companies required $8,000 to $20,000 worth of lithographs posters each season. Another of Leavitt's claims was that he was the first to use "all star" as a billing description. He also claimed that in 1880, he was the first to use the term vaudeville to describe a variety show.

Historians usually cite Leavitt's greatest innovation as the creation of the first touring burlesque company and of the burlesque style in general. Leavitt had witnessed a European troupe known as Rentz's Circus sometime in the 1870s. He then decided to form an all-woman blackface minstrel troupe, which he named Madame Rentz's Female Minstrels. The format of its shows, which Leavitt introduced, merged the three-act blackface minstrel show with aspects of Lydia Thompson's all-female troupe's show, vaudeville, and musical travesty. He called the new genre "burlesque". The troupe, later renamed the Rentz-Stantley Company and then the Rentz-Stantley Novelty and Burlesque Company, was a success, and it set the standard for burlesque companies through the 1880s and 1890s.

Leavitt had a taste for sensationalism. For example, in 1884, he bought the rights to The Danites, a play by McKee Rankin that was quite critical of the Church of Jesus Christ of Latter-day Saints (LDS Church). Leavitt then decided to stage the play in Salt Lake City, where the LDS Church had its headquarters, as a publicity stunt.

Leavitt also handled magicians Alexander Herrmann and Harry Kellar. "Whenever I open a new theatre, " Leavitt once said, "I want to insure of large crowds, I will have Herrmann the Great play the date." Herrmann was always a drawing card where ever he played, receiving fifty percent of the gross receipt earning $75,000 a year (about $3 million in today's figures).

Aged 70 in 1914, Leavitt came out of retirement to enter the motion picture business. He secured the rights to present the film Sixty Years a Queen in the Canadian Maritimes. Despite his advanced age, show business chronicler Robert Grau described Leavitt as "yet as spry and apparently as youthful as he was in his palmy days".
