= Samuel N. Mitchell =

American song lyricist and newspaperman

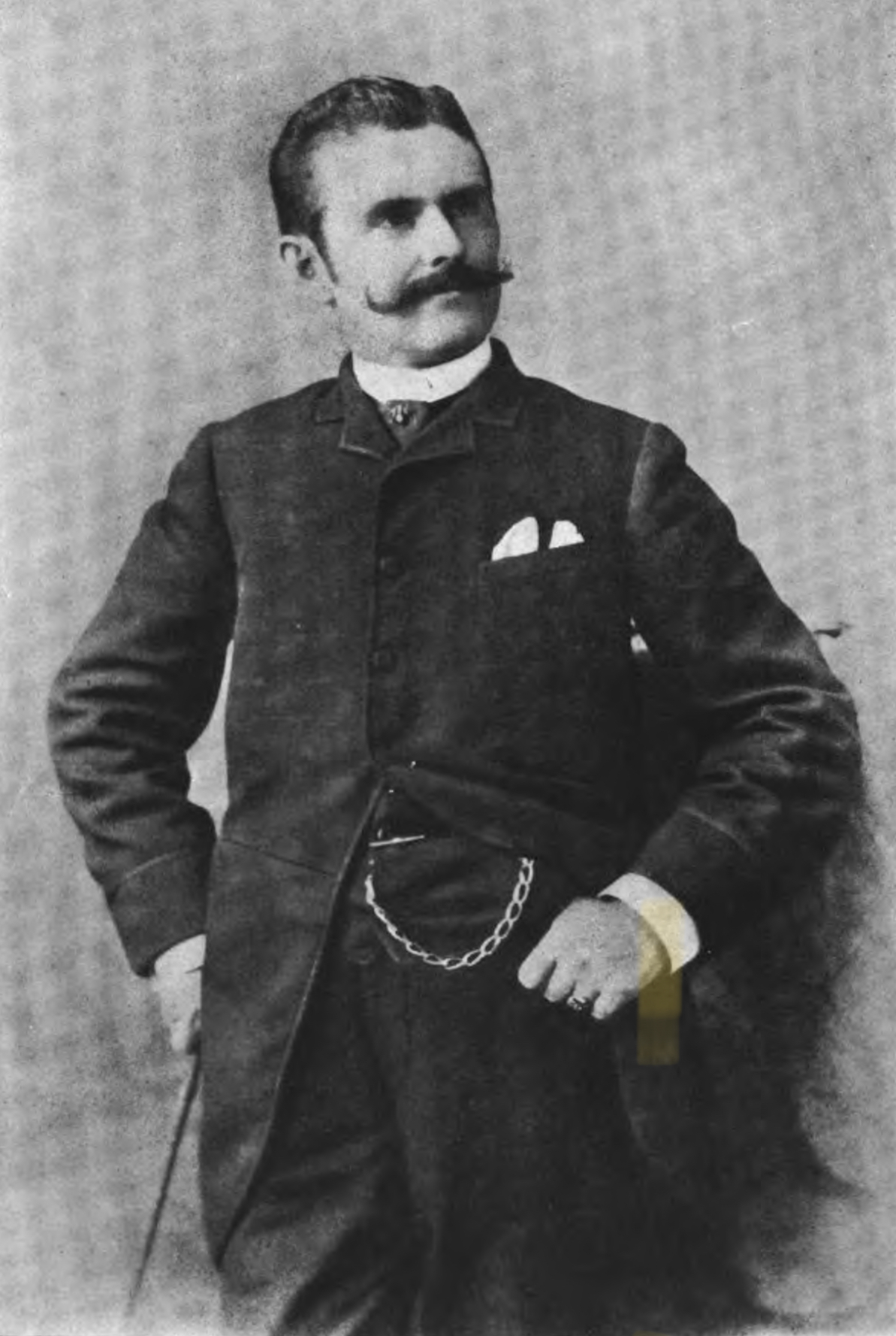
Portrait of Samuel N. Mitchell, “the Bard of Providence, R. I.”

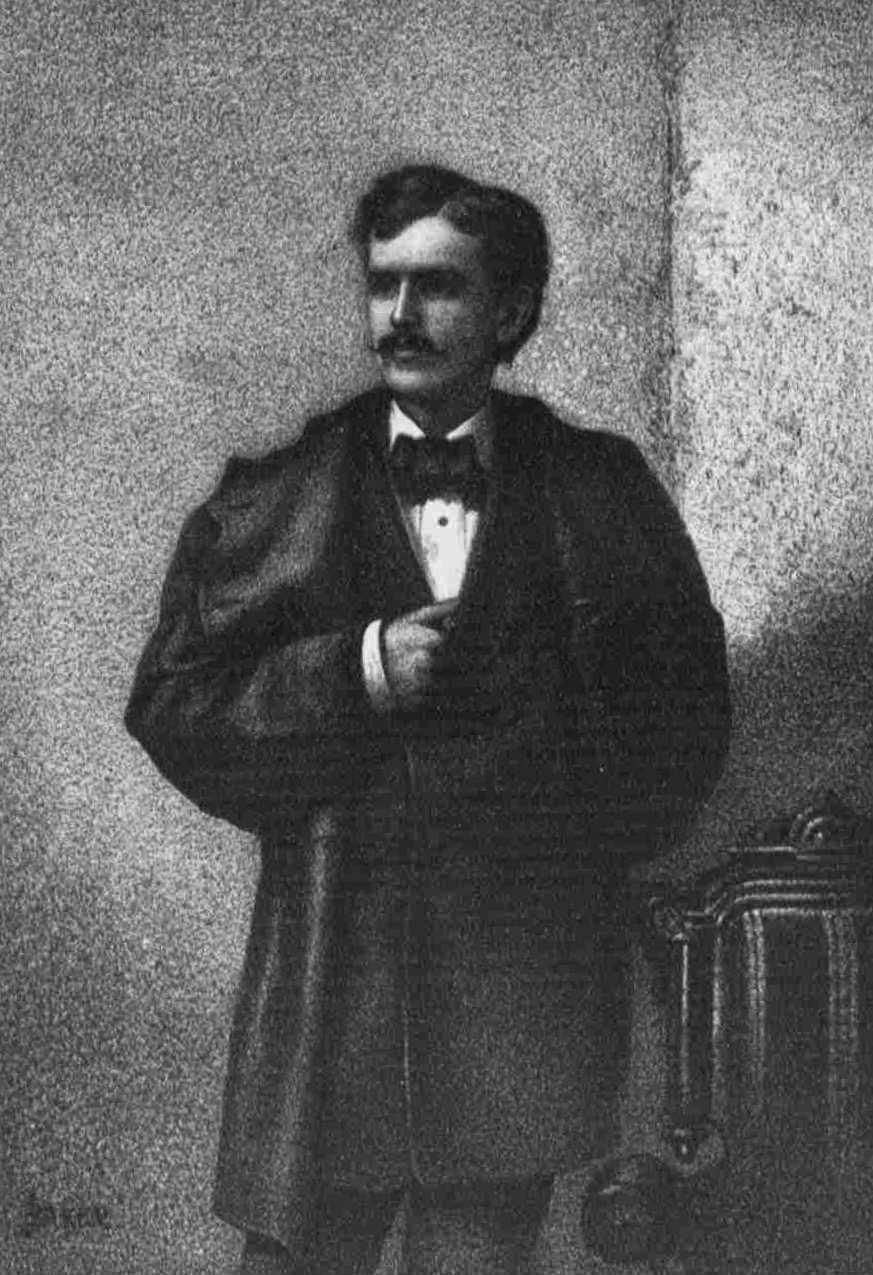
Portrait of Samuel N. Mitchell.

Samuel N. Mitchell (1846–1905) was an American song lyricist and newspaperman who wrote lyrics for a number of popular songs in the 1870s.

== Songwriter ==
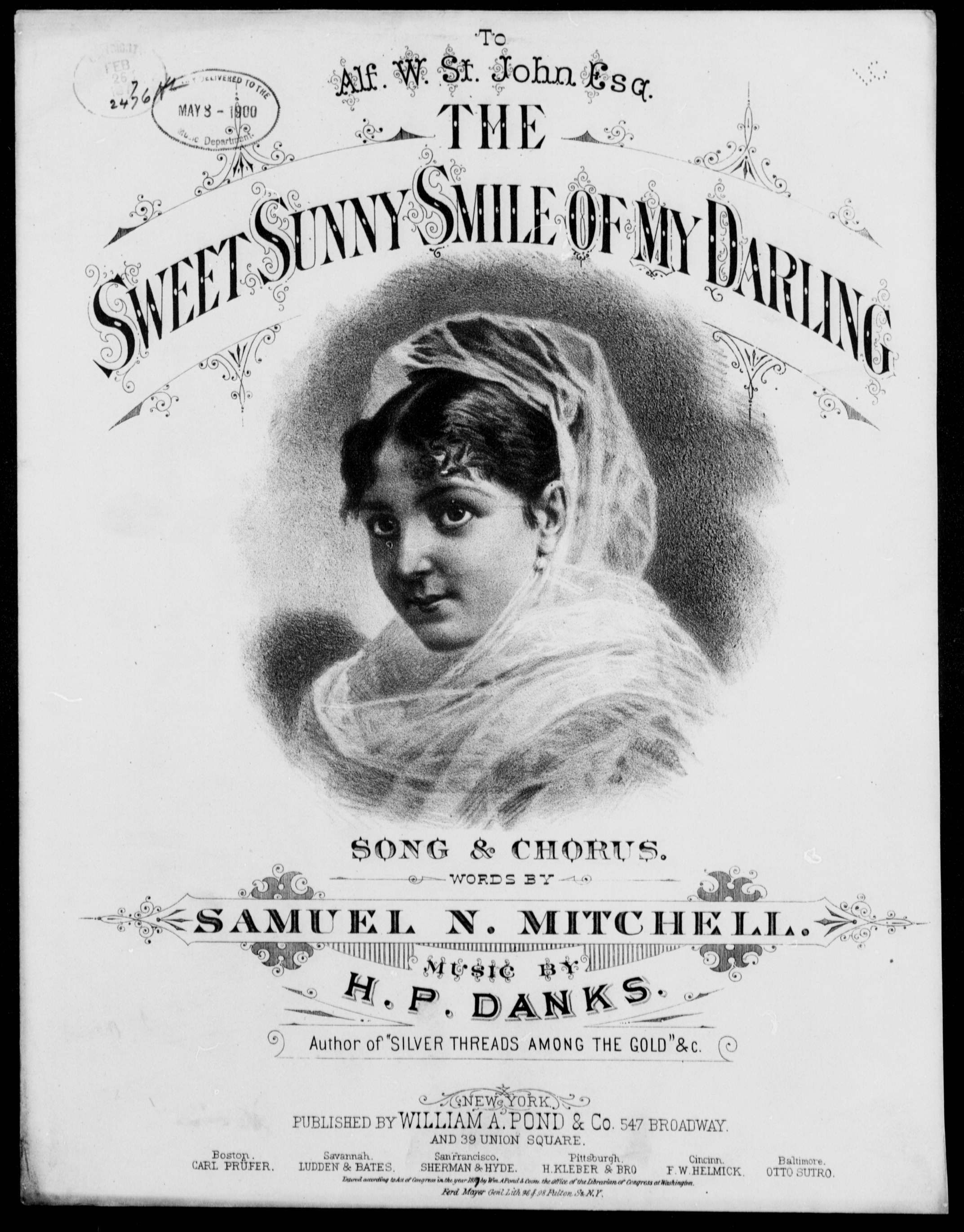
Sheet music cover for The Sweet Sunny Smile of My Darling (1877)

Mitchell wrote lyrics for many hundreds of songs, and collaborated with a number of composers. One of his most popular songs during his life was Just Touch the Harp Gently, My Pretty Louise, first published in 1870. An 1890 profile of Mitchell in the Boston Globe reported that an astounding (and surely exaggerated) four million copies of the song had been sold. Mitchell claimed to never have received any payment for the song, however, as the lyrics were "stolen bodily" from him and brought to London, where Charles Blamphin set them to music. It became popular in England, and eventually theatrical producer Lydia Thompson brought it back to America in the play Bluebeard, and it became popular in the United States as well. Not making a living on his creations, Mitchell was toiling in a newspaper mailroom despite his lyrical successes.

Perhaps Mitchell's most enduring song is Put My Little Shoes Away, which he wrote with Charles E. Pratt in 1873. A mournful ballad where a dying child tells her mother to put her shoes away to save for her infant brother, it reportedly sold over 100,000 sheet music copies. But its popularity long survived in rural America and became a staple among bluegrass performers. It was first recorded by Riley Puckett in 1926, and later by the "Father of Bluegrass" Bill Monroe (1956), the Everly Brothers (1958), Girls of the Golden West, Woody Guthrie, Dolly Parton, and others.

== Personal ==
Mitchell was born in Providence, Rhode Island in 1846, and served during the Civil War in the 11th Rhode Island Infantry Regiment. He was also reported in the news to have served with the Irish Brigade. He died in Providence on November 7, 1905.

== Notable songs ==
- Just Touch the Harp Gently, My Pretty Louise (1870) (music by Charles Blamphin)
- Sadie Ray (1870) (music by J. Tannenbaum) (became a popular minstrel show song)
- When the Whippoorwill is Calling (1871) (music by E.N. Caitlin)
- Put My Little Shoes Away (1873) (music by Charles E. Pratt)
- My Love Sleeps Under the Daisies (1873) (music by George W. Persley)
- Speak to Me Kindly (1873) (music by Ernest Leslie)
- Dear Sunny Days of the Past
- Dance Me, Papa, on Your Knee (1874?) (music by H.P. Danks)
- Amber Tresses Tied In Blue (1874) (music by H.P. Danks) (later recorded with modification by the Carter Family)
- The Lane That Led To School
- When My Love Comes Home To Me (1876) (music by Charles E. Prior)
- Little Bright Eyes at the Window (1876) (music by H.P. Danks)
- Maggie with the Soft Brown Hair(1876) (music by H.P. Danks)
- Our Comrades 'Neath the Sod (music by H.P. Danks)
- The Sunny Smile of My Darling (1877) (music by H.P. Danks)
- Sleeping in Death's Camping Ground (1877?) (music by H.P. Danks)
- We Deck Their Graves Alike Today (1877?) (music by H.P. Danks) (which was performed at Memorial Day (then Decoration Day) celebrations)
- My Dear Savannah Home (1881) (music by H.P. Danks)
- When silver locks replace the gold. Words by Samuel N. Mitchell, music Harry Leighton.

== Songs with William A. Huntley ==
Many of Mitchell's songs were set to music by William A. Huntley, a fellow citizen of Providence, Rhode Island his own age. LOC are scores preserved at the Library of Congress.

- 1871 LOC Addie Alleen. Words by Samuel N. Mitchell, music by William A. Huntley.
- 1871 LOC Come sing to me Addie again. Words by Sam N. Mitchell, music by William A. Huntley.
- 1871 LOC Down the meadow, 'neath the clover. Words by Sam N. Mitchell, music by William A. Huntley.
- 1871 LOC Goodbye, dear Mother! Words by Sam N. Mitchell, music by William A. Huntley.
- 1871 LOC Oh Nixie, that's too thin. Words by Sam N. Mitchell, music by William A. Huntley.
- 1871 LOC Our sweet little rosebud has flown. Words by Sam N. Mitchell, music by William A. Huntley.
- 1871 LOC The angels are calling me, Mother. Words by Samuel N. Mitchell, music by William A. Huntley.
- 1871 LOC They are calling me to join them. Words by Samuel N. Mitchell, music by William A. Huntley.
- 1871 LOC When the moon is rising, Allie. Words by Samuel N. Mitchell, music by William A. Huntley.
- 1872 LOC Bring the absent back to me. Words by Samuel N. Mitchell, music by William A. Huntley.
- 1872 LOC Mother and I have been waiting. Words by Samuel N. Mitchell, music by William A. Huntley.
- 1872 When the song bird says good night. Words by Samuel N. Mitchell, music by William A. Huntley.
- 1873 LOC Close the door softly, for mother's asleep. Words by Samuel N. Mitchell, music by William A. Huntley.
- 1873 LOC Down beside the crimson meadow. Words by Samuel N. Mitchell, music by William A. Huntley.
- 1873 LOC Down the vale where Lillie sleeps. Words by Samuel N. Mitchell, music by William A. Huntley.
- 1873 LOC Just try it once for luck. Words by Samuel N. Mitchell, music by William A. Huntley.
- 1873 LOC Let me kiss him ere I go. Words by Samuel N. Mitchell, music by William A. Huntley.
- 1873 Mamma, come sing me to sleep. Words by Samuel N. Mitchell, music by William A. Huntley.
- 1873 LOC My button hole boquet. Words by Samuel N. Mitchell, music by William A. Huntley.
- 1873 LOC 'Neath the rose leaves on the hillside. Words by Samuel N. Mitchell, music by William A. Huntley.
- 1873 LOC Under the buttercups. Words by Samuel N. Mitchell, music by William A. Huntley.
- 1873 LOC Where have the dear children gone?. Words by Samuel N. Mitchell, music by William A. Huntley.
- 1874 IMSLP Hush, My Little Darling. Words by Samuel N. Mitchell, music by William A. Huntley.
- 1874 LOC Oh just you wait and see. Words by Samuel N. Mitchell, music by William A. Huntley.
- 1874 LOC We met by chance, sweet Jenny. Words by Samuel N. Mitchell, music by William A. Huntley.
- 1875 LOC When the purple lilacs blossom. Words by Samuel N. Mitchell, music by William A. Huntley.
- 1878 LOC Our Willie died this morning. Words by Samuel N. Mitchell, music by William A. Huntley.
- 1879 LOC LSMC I'm going home to Clo. Words by Samuel N. Mitchell, music by William A. Huntley.
- 1880 LOC Come and meet me, Rosa darling. Words by Samuel N. Mitchell, music by William A. Huntley.

== Gallery ==
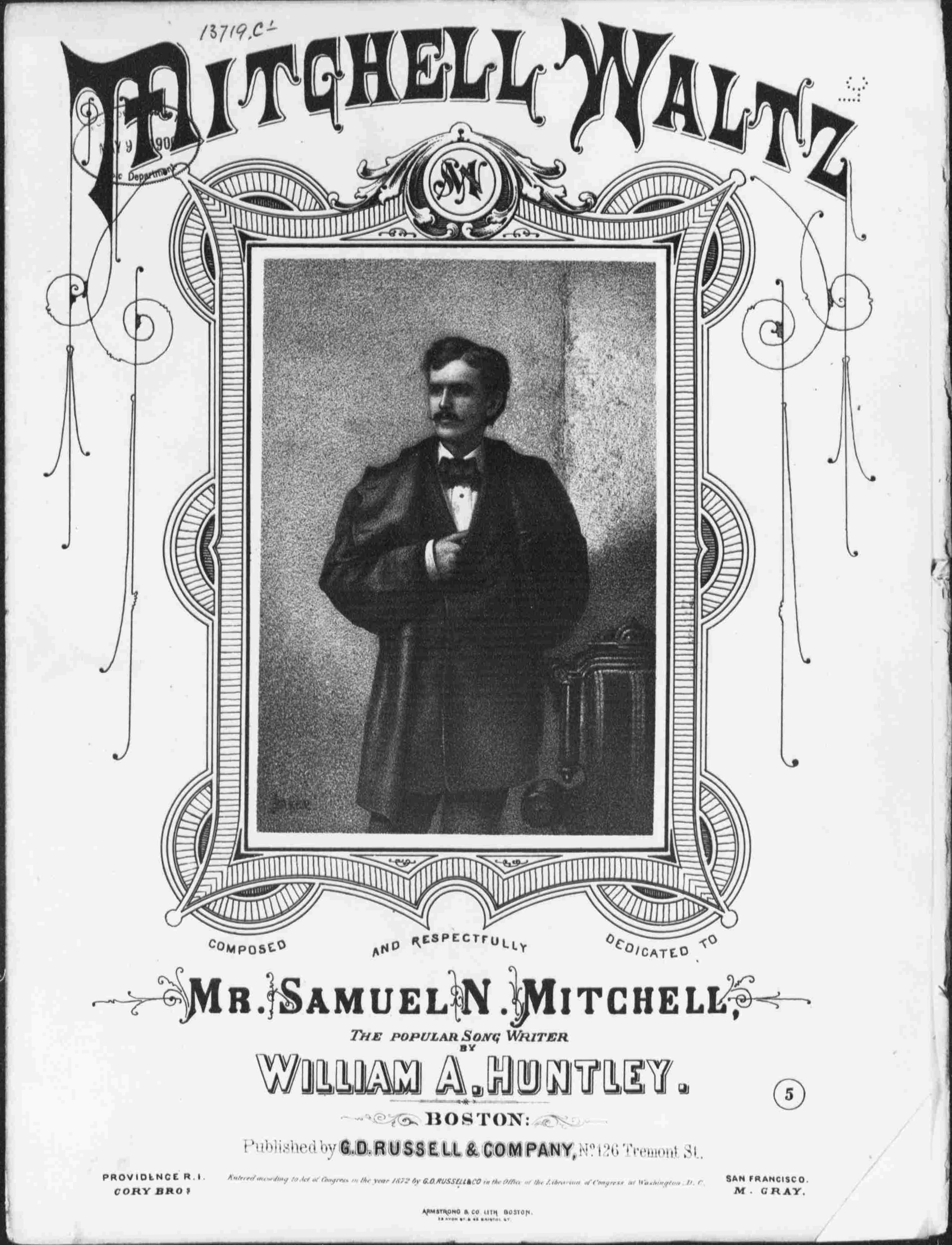
Waltz honoring Mitchell by William A. Huntley, who put music to some of Mitchell's lyrics.
