= Effie Adelaide Rowlands =

British novelist

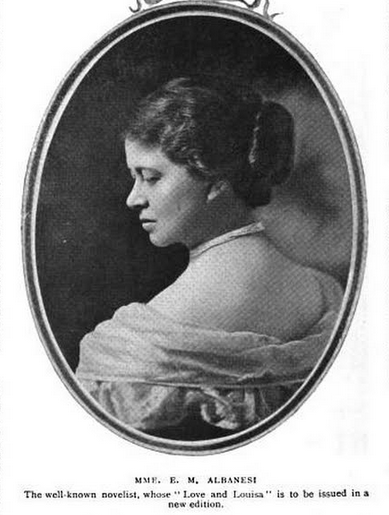
- Rowlands, from a 1904 publication.
- Born: Effie Adelaide Maria Henderson; 1859; Adelaide, Province of South Australia
- Died: 16 October 1936 (aged 76–77); London, England
- Occupation: Novelist
- Spouses: Cecil Raleigh (m. 1882; div. 1893); Carlo Albanesi (m. 1896; died 1926)
- Children: 2, including Meggie Albanesi
- Father: Alexander Henderson
- Relatives: Blanche Massey (half-sister); May Hallatt (niece); Henry Thornton Craven (uncle); Sidney Nelson (grandfather); Lydia Thompson (step-mother); Zeffie Tilbury (step-sister)
- Writing career
- Pen name: Effie Adelaide Rowlands; Effie A. Rowlands; E. Maria Albanesi; Madame Albanesi
- Language: English
- Period: 1886–1936
- Genre: Romance

Effie Adelaide Maria Albanesi (née Henderson, formerly Rowlands; 1859 – 16 October 1936), known by the pen name Effie Adelaide Rowlands, was an Australian-born British novelist. Rowlands published more than 100 penny and sixpenny romances during her lifetime.

== Biography ==
Rowlands was born Effie Adelaide Maria Henderson in 1859 in Adelaide, Province of South Australia (present-day South Australia) to Alexander Henderson, a British theatrical manager, proprietor and promoter, and Marie Nelson (c. 1833 – c. 1834–1913), an English actress and singer who performed under the name Marie Sidney. Her parents were common-law married. The maternal granddaughter of the composer Sidney Nelson, Rowlands was the niece of the actress and vocalist Eliza Nelson and the actor Henry Thornton Craven. The younger sister of the actress Carrie Sydney Hope (née Caroline Sidney Henderson), Rowland was the elder half-sister of the actress and singer Blanche Massey, from her father's relationship with the actress Rose Massey.

Having returned to England, Rowlands was baptised in Southport on 8 July 1864. Rowlands later lived with her mother, who had become a writer, in Epsom. Following her father's marriage to the actress Lydia Thompson in 1873, Rowlands became the stepsister of the actress Zeffie Tilbury.

On 12 December 1882 she married Cecil Rowlands, a playwright who used the stage name Cecil Raleigh, and she started to write before they divorced in 1893.

In 1896, she married Carlo Albanesi (1859-1926), an Italian concert pianist, teacher and composer who from 1893 settled in London and taught at the Royal Academy of Music. They had two daughters, Eva Olimpia Maria Albanesi (b. 1897), and Margherita Cecilia Brigida Lucia Maria Albanesi (better known as the actress Meggie Albanesi) (1899–1923).

== Personal life ==
Rowlands was the aunt of the actress May Hallatt.

She died on 16 October 1936 at her home in London. She was cremated at Golders Green Crematorium.

== Works ==
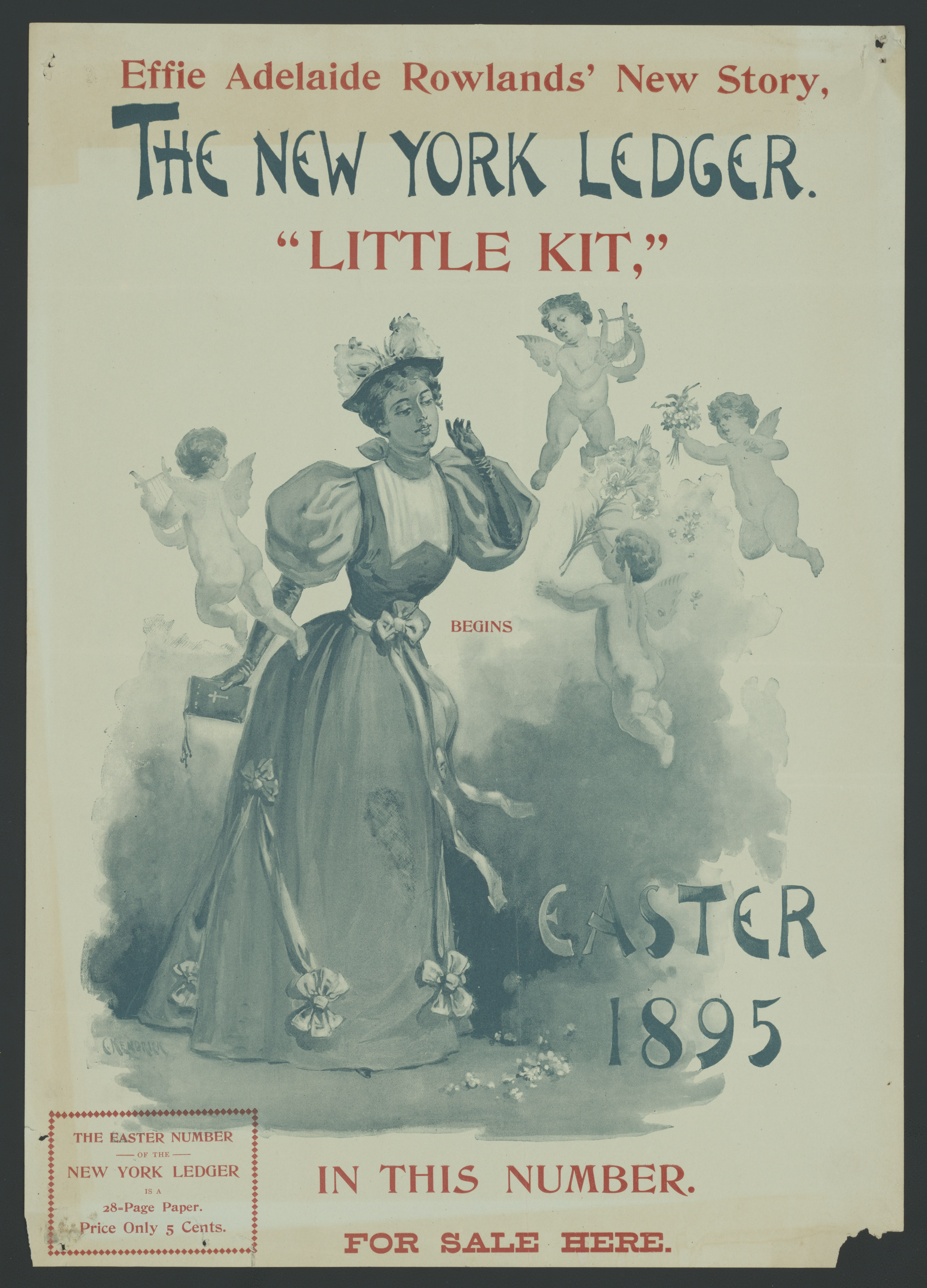
Effie Adelaide Rowlands' story, "Little Kit", The New York Ledger, 1895

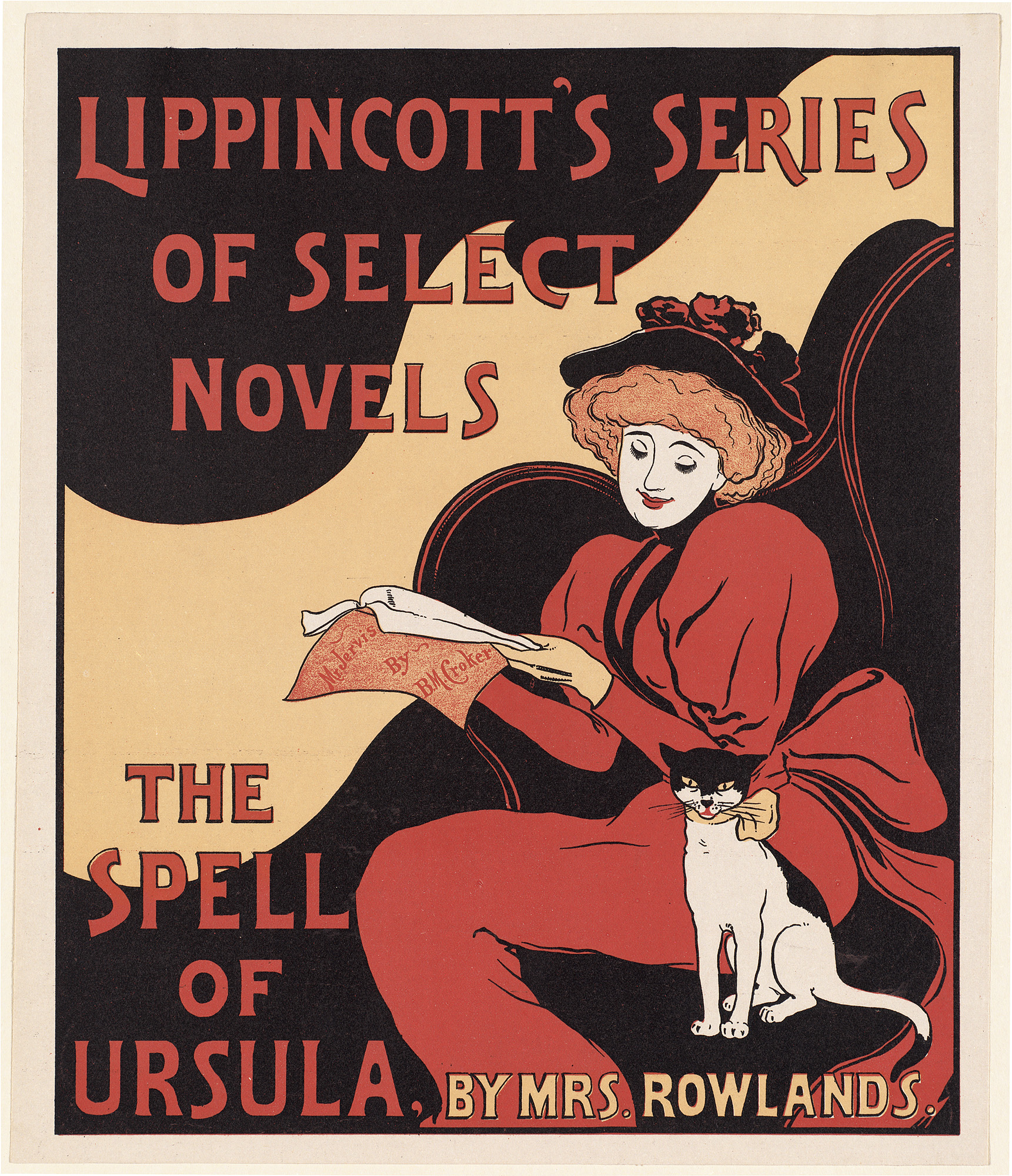
The spell of Ursula, by Mrs. Rowlands - 1894 ad poster

- Margery Daw (1886)
- Woman Against Woman (1890)
- My Pretty Jane (1894)
- The Spell of Ursula (1894)
- A Conqueror of Fate (1895)
- Love the Conqueror (1895)
- The Woman Who Came Between (1895)
- For Love of Sigrid (1895)
- At Great Cost (1895)
- Little Kit (1895)
- A Faithful Traitor (1896)
- The Fault of One (1897)
- The Blunder of An Innocent (1899)
- The Kingdom of a Heart (1899)
- They Laugh That Win (1899)
- A Woman Scorned (1899)
- A King and a Coward (1899)
- Little Aldy Charles (1899)
- The Heart of Hetta (1900)
- Husband and Foe (1900)
- Beneath a Spell (1900)
- A Charity Girl (1900)
- The Man She Loved (1900)
- One Man's Evil (1900)
- Peter, a Parasite (1901)
- Brave Barbara (1901)
- Love and Louisa (1902)
- Susannah and One Elder (1904)
- Capricious Caroline (1904)
- For Ever True (1904)
- Marion Sax (1905)
- Selina's Love Story (1904)
- Temptation of Mary Burr (1904)
- The Brown Eyes of Mary (1905)
- A Love Almost Lost (1905)
- Angel of Evil (1905)
- Her Husband and Her Love (1905)
- So Like a Man (1905)
- A Splendid Man (1905)
- Spurned Proposal (1905)
- Andrew Leicester's Love (1905)
- A Heart's Triumph (1906)
- Sweet William (1906)
- I Know a Maiden (1906)
- A Little Brown Mouse (1906)
- A Young Man from the Country (1906)
- The Wiles of a Siren (1906)
- The End Crowns All (1906)
- A Shadowed Happiness (1906)
- For Love of Sigrid (1906)
- Love's Greatest Gift (a.k.a. The White in the Black) (1906)
- My Lady of Dreadwood (1906)
- A Wife's Triumph (1906)
- Love-In-A-Mist (1907)
- The Strongest of All Things (1907)
- Simple Simon (1907)
- Pretty Penelope (1907)
- Mollie's Ghost (1907)
- Sister Anne (1908)
- The Rose of Yesterday (1908)
- Drusilla's Point of View (1908)
- Pretty Polly Pennington (a.k.a. Sweet and Lovely) (1908)
- The Forbidden Road (1908)
- The Laughter of Life (1908)
- The Invincible Amelia (1909)
- A Question of Quality (1909)
- Envious Eliza (1909)
- The Marriage of Margaret (1909)
- The Glad Heart (1910)
- For Love of Anne Lambert (1910)
- Maisie's Romance (1910)
- Her Punishment (1910)
- The Man She Married (1910)
- After Many Days (1910)
- Contrary Mary (1910)
- A Dangerous Woman (1910)
- For Love of Speranza (1910)
- The Game of Life (1910)
- Her Heart's Longing (1910)
- Her Kingdom (1910)
- John Galbraith's Wife (1910)
- Love for Love (1910)
- A Loyal Man's Love (1910)
- The Master of Lynch Towers (1910)
- The Mistress of the Farm (1910)
- Bitter Sweet (1910)
- A Splendid Destiny (1910)
- A Wonder of Love (1911)
- Poppies in the Corn (1911)
- Heart of His Heart (1911)
- Barbara's Love Story (1911)
- Brave Heart (1911)
- Carlton's Wife (1911)
- Dare and Do (1911)
- False Faith (1911)
- For Ever and a Day (1911), Daily Mail sixpenny novel No. 149, illustrated by G. H. Evison
- A Girl with a Heart (1911)
- Her Mistake (1911)
- Leila Vane's Burden (1911), a Daily Mail sixpenny novel, illustrated by G. H. Evison
- A Life's Love (1911)
- Love's Harvest (1911)
- The Madness of Love (1911)
- The Man at the Gate (1911)
- The One Woman (1911)
- The Power of Love (1911)
- Splendid Love (1911)
- White Abbey (1911)
- A Wild Rose (1911)
- A Woman Worth Winning (1911)
- A Woman's Heart (1911)
- The Young Wife (1911)
- Love's Fire (1911)
- The Triumph of Love (1911)
- Olivia Mary (1912)
- On the Wings of Fate
- Carla
- Change of Heart
- False and True
- For Love and Honor
- The Girl's Kingdom
- Interloper
- Kinsman's Sin
- Love's Cruel Whim
- Siren's Heart
- Tempted by Love
- With Heart So True
- Woman Against Her
- Woman Scorned
- A Golden Dawn (1912)
- Hester Trefusis (1912)
- The House of Sunshine (1912)
- In Love's Land (1912)
- A Love Match (1912)
- The Love of His Life (1912)
- The Rose of Life (1912)
- Temptation (1912)
- To Love and to Cherish (1912)
- The Wooing of Rose (1912)
- His One Love (1912)
- Lavender's Love Story (1912)
- Love Wins (1912)
- A Modern Witch (1912)
- The Beloved Enemy (1913)
- One of the Crowd (1913)
- Cissy (1913)
- Beth Mason (1913)
- Elsie Brant's Daughter (1913)
- Hearts at War (1913)
- The Joy of Life (1913)
- Lady Patricia's Faith (1913)
- Love's Mask (1913)
- Margaret Dent (1913)
- Ruth's Romance (1913)
- Stranger Than Truth (1913)
- The Surest Bond (1913)
- Through Weal and Through Woe (1913)
- In Daffodil Time (1913)
- The Heart of a Woman (1913)
- Judged by Fate (1913)
- The Cap of Youth (1914)
- The Sunlit Hills (1914)
- The Man of Mystery (1914)
- When a Woman Dreams (1914)
- The Hand of Fate (1914)
- Her Husband (1914)
- An Irish Lover (1914)
- Money or Wife? (1914)
- On the High Road (1914)
- Two Waifs (1914)
- At Her Mercy (1914)
- The Price Paid (1914)
- Prudence Langford's Ordeal (1914)
- Love's Young Dream (1914)
- Above All Things (1915)
- Sunset and Dawn (1915)
- The Woman's Fault (1915)
- Hearts and Sweethearts (1916)
- The Girl Who Was Brave (1916)
- When Michael Came to Town (1917)
- The Splendid Friend (1917)
- The Heart of Angela Brent (1917)
- Truant Happiness (1918)
- Diana Falls in Love (1919)
- Tony's Wife (19aka: Punch and Judy) (1919)
- A Strange Love Story (1919)
- Patricia and Life (1920)
- Love's Shadows (1920)
- John Helsby's Wife (1920)
- The House That Jane Built (1921)
- Mary Dunbar's Love (1921)
- Roseanne (1922)
- Truth in a Circle (1922)
- Against the World (1923)
- The Flame of Love (1923)
- The Garland of Youth (1923)
- A Bird in a Storm (1924)
- Young Hearts (1924)
- The Life Line (1924)
- Real Gold (1924)
- Sally in Her Alley (1925)
- The Shadow Wife (1925)
- Out of a Clear Sky (1925)
- The Way of Youth (1925)
- Brave Love (1926)
- A Bunch of Blue Ribbons (1926)
- Lady Feo's Daughter (1926)
- Sally Gets Married (1927)
- The Green Country (1927)
- The Gates of Happiness (1927)
- A Man from the West (1927)
- Fateful Promise
- Her Golden Secret
- Hero for Love's Sake
- Unhappy Bargain
- Meggie Albanesi [1928)
- The Moon Through Glass (1928)
- Claire and Circumstances (a.k.a. In Love with Claire) (1928)
- Fine Feathers (1928)
- Lights and Shadows (1928)
- Gold in the Dust (1929)
- A Heart for Sale (1929)
- Spring in the Heart (1929)
- While Faith Endures (1929)
- The Clear Stream (1930)
- Loyalty (1930)
- The Courage of Love (1930)
- White Flame (1930)
- Coulton's Wife (1930)
- Dorinda's Lovers (1930)
- The Fighting Spirit (1930)
- Sunlight Beyond (1930)
- Coloured Lights (1931)
- The Posy Ring (1931)
- Wings of Chance (1931)
- Princess Charming (1931)
- All's Well with the World (1932)
- The Moon of Romance (1932)
- Snow in Summer (1932)
- Green Valleys (1932)
- The Laughter of Life (1932)
- A Loyal Defence (1932)
- A Star in the Dark (1933)
- White Branches (1933)
- A Ministering Angel (1933)
- Through the Mist (1934)
- The Half Open Door (1934)
- Frances Fights for Herself (1934)
- A School for Hearts (1934)
- An Unframed Portrait (1935)
- A World of Dreams (1935)
- The One Who Paid (1935)
- As a Man Loves (1936)
- The Hidden Gift (1936)
- A Leaf Turned Down (1936)
- The Heart Line (1936)
- The Lamp of Friendship (1936)
- The Little Lady (1937)
- The Love That Lives (1937)
- The One Who Counted (1937)
- Her Father's Wish (1937)
- The Top of the Tree (1937)
