= Emma Grattan =

English stage actress and singer

- Born: 1835; England
- Died: 8 August 1893; New York
- Occupations: Actress; dancer; singer

Emma Grattan (1835 – 9 August 1893) was a 19th-century English stage actress and singer.

Grattan was born with the surname Hunt; Grattan was a family name she later adopted as a stage name. Comedian and manager Benjamin Webster was a family friend and encouraged her dramatic interests. She married Henry Courtaine. The couple traveled to California around 1859 and later onto to China and India. She managed a theatre in Bombay for two years. After later returning to England, she subsequently came to New York. She also performed in America with Lydia Thompson's burlesque troupe.

Grattan died in New York in 1893.
