= The Forty Thieves (1869 play) =

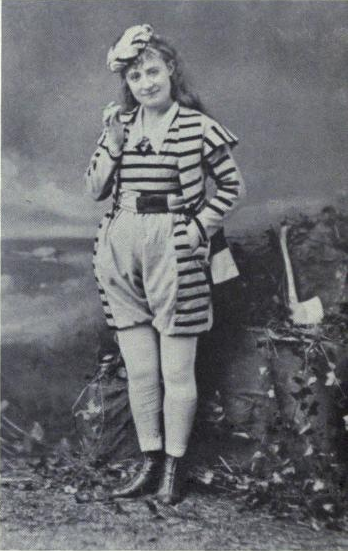
- Lydia Thompson as Ganem in The Forty Thieves
- Original language: English
- Genre: Victorian Burlesque

Premiere
- Date: 1 February 1869
- Place: Niblo's Garden

The Forty Thieves, subtitled Striking Oil in Family Jars, is an 1869 Victorian burlesque that Lydia Thompson's company debuted at Niblo's Garden in New York City on February 1, 1869. It ran for 136 performances.

The work was written by Henry Brougham Farnie though it was primarily a "reconstructed" version of Ali Baba and the Forty Thieves, or Harlequin and the Genii of the Arabian Nights, which played at Covent Garden in 1866, with jokes and other new material added for an 1868 Liverpool production. It was produced by Henry C. Jarrett and Harry Palmer.

The primary gimmick of the show was that women played all the main male roles, just as Thompson had done with Ixion with great success when her troupe first came over from Britain in 1868. Ixion had played at the smaller Wood's Museum, so Thompson's move to Niblo's (which seated 3,200) for Forty Thieves demonstrated her troupe's growing popularity. In this show, women also played all of the forty thieves. Thompson's success generated backlash and became the subject of an anti-burlesque sentiment that arose that year. Despite the negative attacks on burlesque's "leg business", Forty Thieves ran until May 1869. Its take in February 1869 was $54,487, the best month of any New York theater for two years, and better than the long-running Black Crook had done in any month.

== Original Broadway cast ==
- Lydia Thompson as Ganem
- Lisa Weber as Morgiana
- Pauline Markham as Abdallah (Edith Challis actually started role due to illness by Markham)
- Emma Grattan as Orchobrand
- Harry Beckett as Hassarac
- W. J. Hill as Ali Baba
- George F. Ketchum as Casim
- J.W. Brutone as Cogia
- Lizzie Kelsey as Amber
- Belle Land as the Fairy Queen

After some updates to the play in April 1869, Clara Thompson appeared as Amber, and Lizzie Kelsey became the Fairy Queen. Bessie Sudlow also joined the cast
