= Madame Rentz's Female Minstrels =

Blackface minstrel troupe composed only of women

Madame Rentz's Female Minstrels was a minstrel troupe composed completely of women. If they ever performed in blackface, they stopped doing so by 1871, when promotional articles report "the young ladies all appear in white faces..." and publicity posters seem to confirm that. M. B. Leavitt founded the company in 1870. Unlike mainstream minstrelsy at the time, Leavitt's cast was entirely made up of women, whose primary role was to showcase their scantily clad bodies and tights, not the traditional role of comedy routines or song and dance numbers. The women still performed a basic minstrel show, but they added new pieces that titillated the audience. John E. Henshaw, who began his career as a stage hand with Madame Rentz's Female Minstrels, recalled,

"In San Francisco, we had advertised that we were going to put on the can-can. Mabel Santley did this number and when the music came to the dum-de-dum, she raised her foot just about twelve inches; whereupon the entire audience hollored [sic] 'Whooooo!' It set them crazy."

The company was a success, and by 1871, at least eleven rival troupes of female minstrels had sprung up, one of which did away with blackface altogether. This movement eventually gave rise to the "girlie show".
