= Alice Dunning Lingard =

English actress

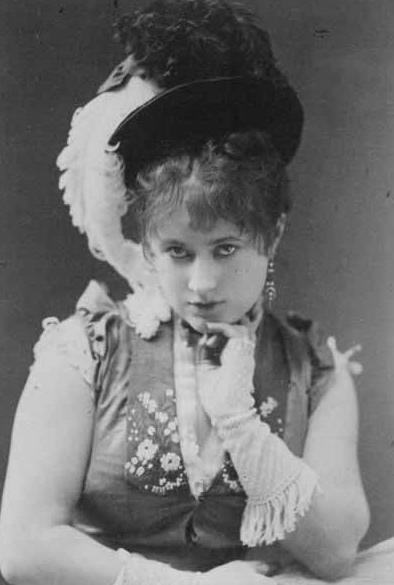
- Photograph of Lingard c. 1880
- Born: 29 July 1847
- Died: 25 June 1897 (aged 49)
- Occupation: Actress
- Spouse: William Lingard

Alice Dunning Lingard (29 July 1847 – 25 June 1897) was an English actress who performed both in England and in the United States, and was the wife of mimic and comic William Lingard.

Lingard was born in London on 29 July 1847 and had her stage debut there, at the Grecian Theatre. She married William Lingard in 1866 and went to the United States for the first time in 1868, along with her sister Harriet Dunning (later Lady Dalziel, wife of Baron Davison Dalziel of Wooler, and who went by the stage name “Dickie Lingard”). Her stage debut in America was on 11 August 1868 in the role of "Widow White" in Mr. and Mrs. Peter White. Her travels took her around the United States, Australia, and New Zealand.

Lingard died on 25 June 1897 and was buried at Brompton Cemetery in London.
