= May Hallatt =

English actress (1876–1969)

- Born: Marie Effie Hullatt; 1 May 1876; Scarborough, England
- Died: 20 May 1969 (aged 93); London, England
- Occupation: Actress
- Years active: 1934–1965

May Hallatt (born Marie Effie Hullatt; 1 May 1876 – 20 May 1969) was an English theater and film actress.

== Personal life ==
Born on 1 May 1876 in Scarborough, was baptised at St Michael on the Mount, Lincoln, on 13 Jan 1884, she was the daughter of actor William Henry Hallatt, and actress Carrie Sydney, née Caroline Sidney Henderson. Her mother was daughter of the Artist agent Alexander "Alex" Henderson, father of the writer Effie Adelaide Rowlands and the actress Blanche Massey. Her cousin was the actress Meggie Albanesi.

A number of published sources incorrectly name her as mother of the actor Neil Hallett.

May Hallatt died on 20 May 1969 in London, England, aged 93.

== Career ==
Often cast in eccentric roles, within her 30-year career, she was known for Painted Boats (1945), Black Narcissus (1947) and Separate Tables (1958).

In Terence Rattigan's Separate Tables, she played Miss Meacham in the 1954 original West End, Broadway productions and the film versions.

== Filmography ==
Year	Title	Role	Notes
1934	Important People	Mrs. Stenham	
1934	Virginia's Husband		Uncredited
1937	Talking Feet		Uncredited
1939	The Lambeth Walk	Lady Battersby	
1939	The Dark Eyes of London	Police Constable Griggs	Uncredited
1939	The Mysterious Mr. Davis	Telegraph Clerk	Uncredited
1945	Painted Boats	Her Mother	
1947	Black Narcissus	Angu Ayah	
1949	Trottie True	Old Ellen	Uncredited
1949	The Romantic Age	Matron	Uncredited
1949	The Spider and the Fly	Monique	
1952	The Card	Ladies Committee Member	Uncredited
1952	Ivanhoe	Elgitha	Uncredited
1953	The Pickwick Papers		Uncredited
1953	Grand National Night	Hoskyns	
1953	Rob Roy, the Highland Rogue	Ballad Hawker	
1954	The Million Pound Note	Hysterical Woman at Bumbles Hotel	Uncredited
1955	The Gold Express	Agatha Merton	
1958	The Horse's Mouth	Charwoman	Uncredited
1958	Separate Tables	Miss Meacham	
1959	Room at the Top	Miss Tanfield	Uncredited
1960	Make Mine Mink	Old Mrs. Spanager	Uncredited
1961	Follow That Man	Nannie	
1961	Dangerous Afternoon	Miss Burge	
1963	Bitter Harvest	Aunt Sarah	
