= When the Corn Is Waving, Annie Dear =

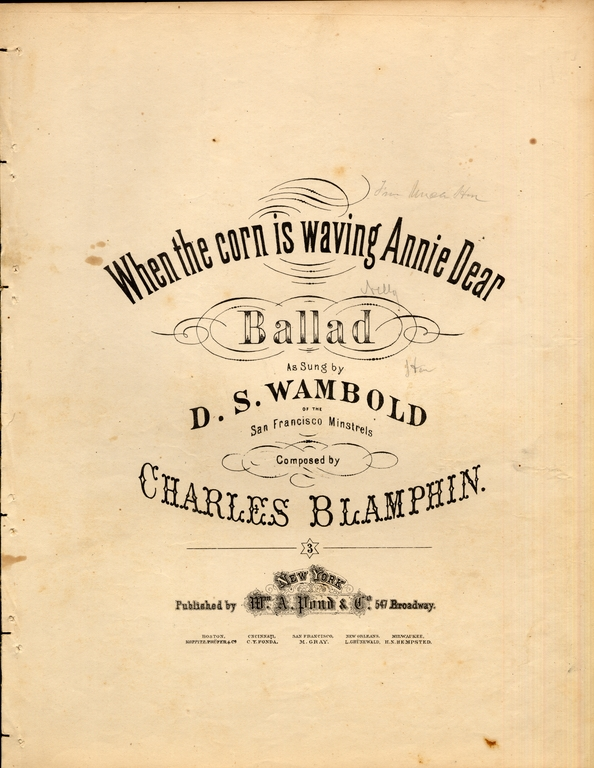
- Cover of sheet music to popular 1860 song, "When the Corn Is Waving, Annie Dear."

Song
- Language: English
- Published: 1860
- Songwriter(s): Charles Blamphin

When the Corn Is Waving, Annie Dear is a song by Charles Blamphin first published in 1860, popular in the 19th and early 20th century. It was printed by a number of publishing houses in the United States in 1860 and also eventually became popular in England.

Early recordings of the song include performances by the Apollo Quartet (1911), Knickerbocker Quartet (1914), and Peerless Quartet (1921).
