= Alexander Henderson (manager) =

British theatrical manager, proprietor and promoter

Alexander Henderson (1828, England – 1 February 1886, Cannes), also known as Alex Henderson and Alec Henderson, was a British theatrical manager, theatre proprietor and builder, and operatic and theatrical promoter. Henderson was the father of the novelist Effie Adelaide Rowlands, the actress Carrie Sydney Hope (née Caroline Sidney Henderson) and the actress and singer Blanche Massey. On 28 July 1873, Henderson married the actress Lydia Thompson and became the stepfather of the actress Zeffie Tilbury.
