= Charles Blamphin =

British composer and harpist

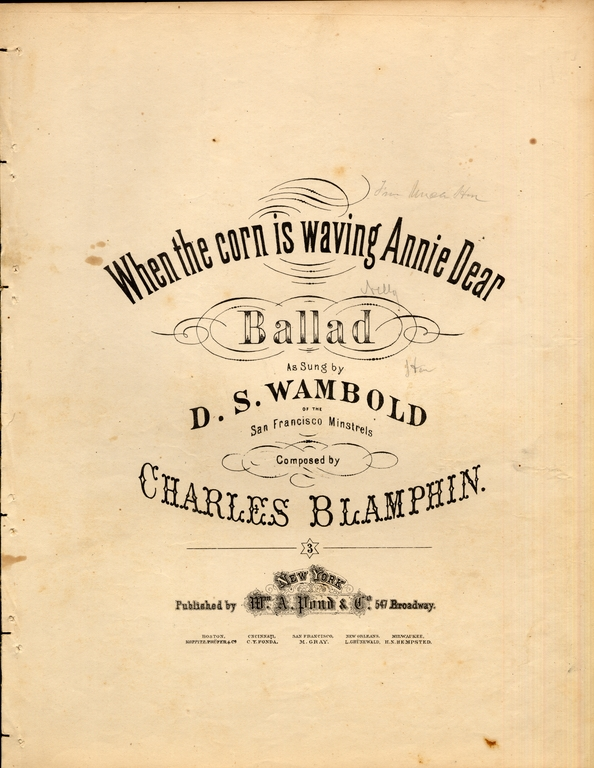
Sheet music cover for When the Corn Is Waving, Annie Dear (1860)

Charles Blamphin (1830? – June 20, 1895) was a British composer and harpist. Among his popular compositions were When the Corn Is Waving, Annie Dear (1860) and Just Touch the Harp Gently, My Pretty Louise (with lyrics by Samuel N. Mitchell) (1870).
