= Meggie Albanesi =

British actress (1899–1923)

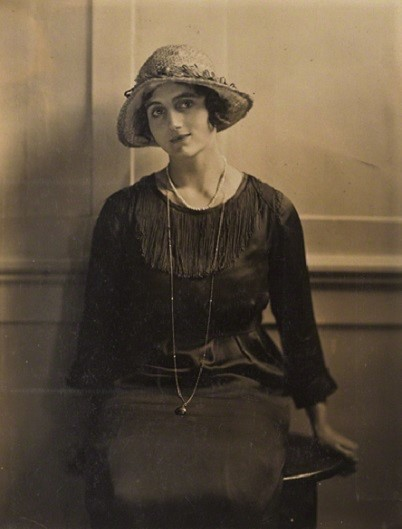
- Albanesi in 1922
- Born: Margherita Cecilia Brigida Lucia Maria Albanesi; 8 October 1899; London, England
- Died: 9 December 1923 (aged 24); Broadstairs, Kent, England
- Education: Royal Academy of Dramatic Art
- Occupation: Actress
- Years active: 1917–1923
- Relatives: Carlo Albanesi (father); Effie Adelaide Rowlands (mother)

Margherita Cecilia Brigida Lucia Maria Albanesi (8 October 1899 – 9 December 1923) was a British stage and film actress.

== Life and career ==
She was born in London on 8 October 1899. Her father was Italian-born Carlo Albanesi (1856–1926), a pianist and teacher at the Royal Academy of Music, while her mother was Effie Adelaide Rowlands (1859–1936), a writer who published over 250 romance novels and short stories. Her mathernal grandfather was the theater manager and owner Alexander "Alex" Henderson, and her cousin the actress May Hallatt.

From the age of ten, Albanesi studied violin with Rowsby Woof. She later attended the Royal Academy of Dramatic Art where she was awarded the Bancroft Medal. She enjoyed a short but successful theatre career, appearing in plays such as John Galsworthy's The First and the Last, opposite Owen Nares, and The School for Scandal and Mr. Todd's Experiment. She was soon being hailed by critics as one of the brightest prospects in British acting.

In 1920 she appeared as Jill in Galsworthy's play The Skin Game, and played the same role in the 1921 film of the play. In 1921 Albanesi starred as Sydney Fairfield in Clemence Dane's first and most famous play, A Bill of Divorcement, and in 1922 played Mabel Dancy in Galsworthy's play Loyalties which ran for nearly a year at the St Martin's Theatre. Albanesi appeared in six films between 1919 and 1922 including The Romance of Old Bill, Darby and Joan and Mr. Wu.

== Death ==
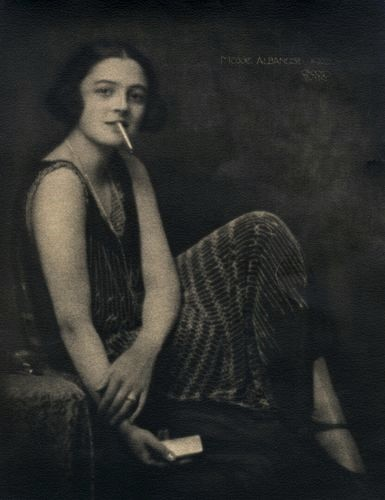
Portrait by Henry B. Goodwin, 1922

Albanesi died at the age of 24 in Broadstairs, Kent, on 9 December 1923, after emergency abdominal surgery caused by intestinal obstruction due to inflammatory adhesions. This was allegedly a consequence of an illegal abortion. She was buried in St Pancras and Islington Cemetery in north London.

Albanesi had a relationship with the theatre and film producer Basil Dean, who continued to be obsessed with her after her death. Dean was first attracted to his wife, the actress Victoria Hopper, because of her physical resemblance to Albanesi and cast her in a number of his productions. His final film as a director 21 Days was based on a play, The First and the Last, on which he had worked with Albanesi.

Dean commissioned Eric Gill to create a memorial plaque to Albanesi, which can be seen in the foyer of the St Martin's Theatre, West Street, London. Her friend Noël Coward dedicated the first published text of his play The Rat Trap to the "dear memory of Meggie Albanesi" in 1924.

== Filmography ==
Year	Film	Role	Notes
1919	The Romance of Old Bill	Waitress	
1919	Mr. Wu	Nang Ping	
1920	Darby and Joan	Elin Garry	
1920	The Great Day	Lillian Leeson	
1921	The Skin Game	Jill Hillcrist	
1922	The Surrounded House	Mary Lixton	

== Theatre credits ==
=== Theatre ===
Year	Title	Role	Venue	Notes
1918–19	Henry of Navarre		Grand Theatre, Southampton	
1920	Mr Todd's Experiment	Elsie Merridew	Queen's Theatre, London	
1920–21	The Skin Game	Jill	St Martin's Theatre, London	
1921	The First and Last	Wanda	Aldwych Theatre, London	
1921	Shall we Join the Ladies	Honorine	Buckingham Palace	
1921–22	A Bill of Divorcement	Sydney Fairfield	St Martin's Theatre, London	
1922–23	East of Suez	Daisy	His Majesty's Theatre, London	
1922–23	Loyalties	Mabel Dancy	St Martin's Theatre, London	
1923	The Lilies of the Field	Elizabeth	The Ambassadors Theatre, London	
1923	Melloney Hotspur	Lenda	St Martin's Theatre, London	

== Bibliography ==
- Chambers, Colin (2002). Continuum Companion to Twentieth Century Theatre. Continuum. ISBN 978-1847140012.
- Sweet, Matthew (2006). Shepperton Babylon: The Lost Worlds of British Cinema. Faber & Faber. ISBN 978-0571212989.
