= William Lingard =

American comic singer

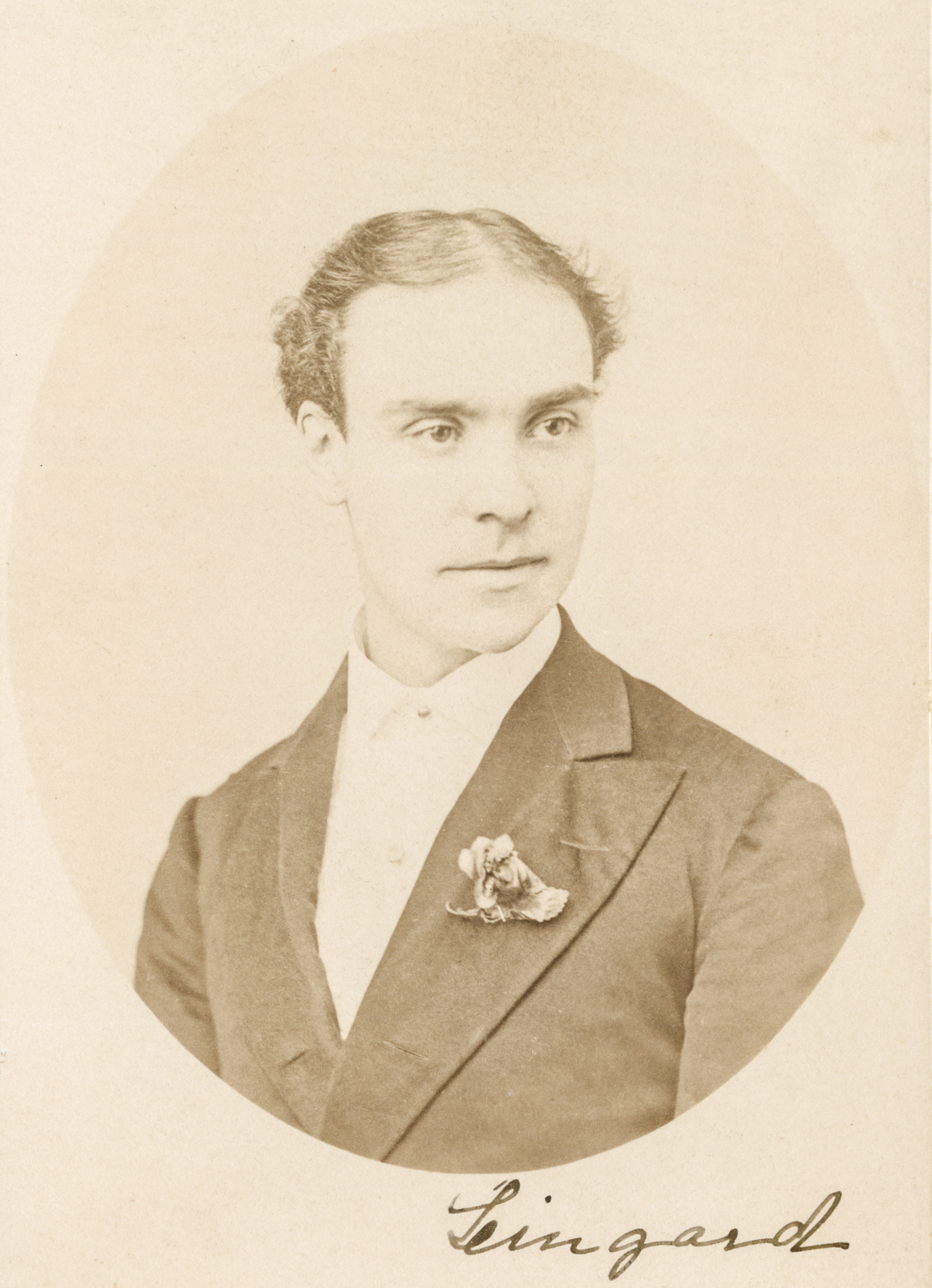
William Horace Lingard, c. 1868

William Redworth Needham (1837–1927), better known by the stage name of William Horace Lingard, was a 19th century American comic singer.

== Early life and marriages ==
William Horace Lingard is the stage name of William Redworth Needham, who was christened in Oakham, England on 27 May 1837, son of George Gilson Needham, a baker, and wife Sarah. However, his parents moved their family to London by 1840.

On 3 April 1860, under the name of William Thomas, at St Anne, Limehouse, London, he married Amelia Martha Flint (1836–1903). Amelia was also a professional actor under the stage name "Miss Minnie Foster". Together they had a child, William Harry Thomas (1861–1941), born on 7 November 1861. William Harry later became an actor, known professionally as "Horace Lingard junior".

However, the marriage with Amelia Flint fell apart soon afterwards and Lingard bigamously married 19 year old Alice Dunning (1845–1897) at Bristol in June 1866. A decade later, in 1877, Amelia successfully sued Lingard for divorce on the grounds of proven adultery. She was also awarded custody of her child. Amelia later married an East London engineer, William Musto (1828–1896), in 1878. Together they ran the White Horse Tavern in Mile End Old Town, London, in the 1890s.

On 11 August 1883, Lingard (still calling himself a "bachelor") married Alice Dunning legally at Holy Trinity, Grays Inn Road, London. The witnesses on this occasion were Alice's sister Harriet Sarah Dunning and her husband Davison Dalziel.

== Immigration to America and subsequent tours ==
In 1868, Lingard immigrated to America (along with his wife, Alice Dunning Lingard). He made his comic debut in New York City that year. After this debut—held at the Theatre Comique, on 6 April 1868—Lingard became known as one of the funniest men of the time. He continued his career in New York, and later became manager of Wood's Theatre there.

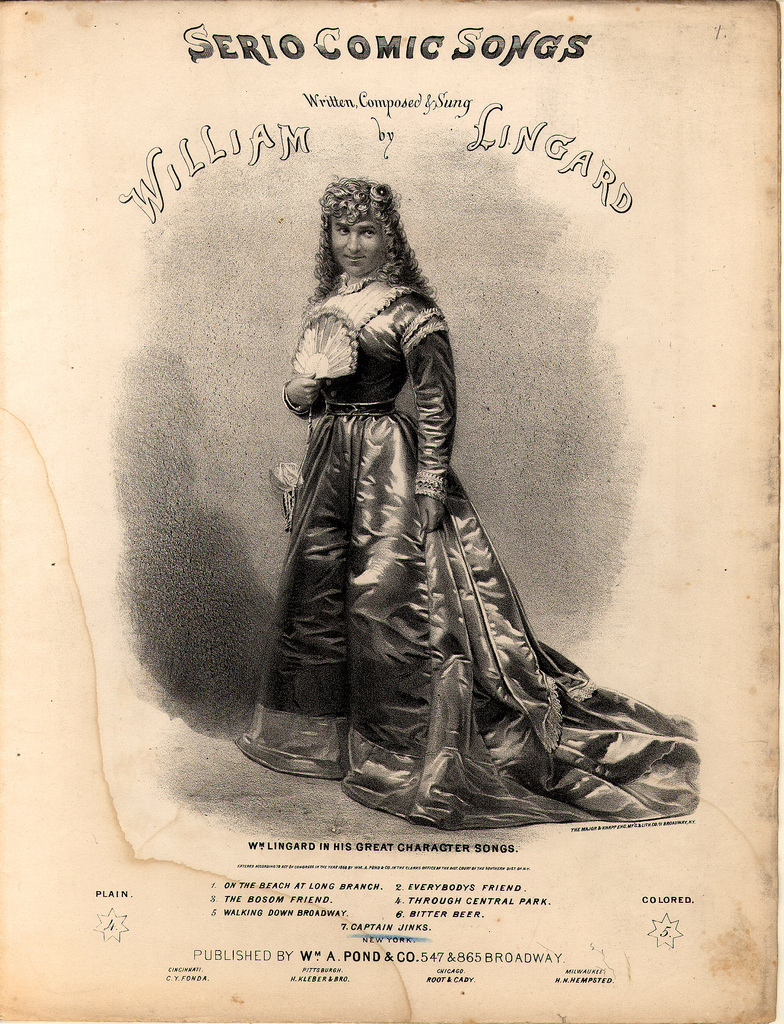
William Lingard, dressed as a woman on one of his song sheets. (circa ~1870)

Lingard's troupe, which included Alice's sister, Harriet Sarah Dunning (who went by the stage name "Dickey Lingard") toured Australia twice, the first time commencing in 1876 and the second commencing in 1879.

During his second Australian tour, in 1880, Lingard was successfully sued in the Supreme Court of the Australian Colony of Victoria by Gilbert and Sullivan for his unauthorised production of HMS Pinafore. This most likely prompted "The Wreck of the Pinafore" which was written by Lingard and set to music by Luscombe Searelle.

== Style ==
Lingard often appeared on stage in drag, in the high fashion style of the era. Additionally, he mastered the art of quick change, eventually becoming able to act the part of some sixteen characters, with only a few seconds for each costume change. Many were impersonations of well-known historical characters, such as Otto von Bismarck, Napoleon III, and Brigham Young.

== Major role ==
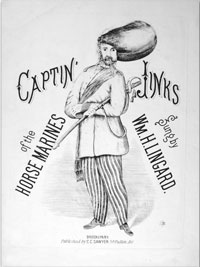
Song sheet for Lingard's "Captain Jinks" performance, circa 1868.

Lingard is chiefly remembered for the well-known vaudeville song, "Captain Jinks of the Horse Marines", sometimes shortened to simply "Captain Jinks." Lingard wrote the lyrics, and the music is attributed to T. Maclagan. It was a popular song of the 19th century, and is still sung to this day, having entered the country-western and bluegrass repertory. The song later became the basis of a stage comedy of the same title, written by Clyde Fitch, and a 1975 opera by Jack Beeson. The song has various renditions.
