= Lydia Thompson =

English dancer, comedian, actor and theatrical producer (1838–1908)

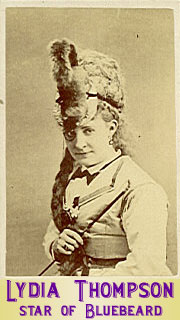
- Lydia Thompson in Bluebeard (1872)
- Born: Eliza Hodges Thompson; 19 February 1838; Covent Garden, London, England
- Died: 17 November 1908 (aged 70); London, England
- Occupations: Dancer, comedian, actress, theatrical producer
- Spouses: John Christian Tilbury (m. 1863; died 1864); Alexander Henderson (m. 1873; died 1886)
- Children: Zeffie Tilbury
- Relatives: Clara Bracy (sister)

Lydia Thompson (born Eliza Hodges Thompson; 19 February 1838 – 17 November 1908), was an English dancer, comedian, actor and theatrical producer.

From 1852, as a teenager, she danced and performed in pantomimes, in the UK and then in Europe and soon became a leading dancer and actress in burlesques on the London stage. In 1868, she introduced Victorian burlesque to America with her troupe, the "British Blondes", to great acclaim and notoriety. Her career began to decline in the 1890s, but she continued to perform into the early years of the 20th century.

== Early years ==
Thompson was born in Brydges Street, Covent Garden, London to Eliza (née Cooper) and Philip Thompson (c. 1801–1842), owner of the Sheridan Knowles, a public house. Thompson was the second of three surviving children, including actress Clara Bracy. Her father died in 1842, and her mother remarried Edward Hodges. By the age of 14, Thompson had left home and joined the stage professionally as a dancer.

In 1852, she became a member of the corps de ballet at Her Majesty's Theatre, London. By the following year she was playing a solo role, Little Silverhair, in the pantomime Harlequin and the Three Bears, or, Little Silverhair and the Fairies at the Haymarket Theatre. In 1854 she danced at the old Globe Theatre in Blackfriars Road, in James Planché's extravaganza, Mr Buckstone's Voyage Round the Globe. She gained wider public attention later that year at the St James's Theatre in The Spanish Dancers, a burletta by Thomas Selby, playing the famous dancer Señora Perea Nena. The Times dismissed the piece but praised her performance highly: "It was no burlesque; it was one excellent dancer following in the steps of another, catching the spirit of her model, and rivalling her in the audacity of her execution. The youth and beauty of Miss Thompson gave an additional charm to her Andalusian feats."

There, she also played in the burlesque Ganem, the Slave of Love, and in the ballet-farce Magic Toys. These performances brought a period of prosperity to what had come to be regarded as one of the unluckiest theatres in London. She also appeared that year in The King's Rival by Tom Taylor and Charles Reade (J. L. Toole's first London role), Beauties of the Harem, and, again at the Haymarket, in the title role in the Christmas pantomime Little Bo Peep, or, Harlequin and the Girl who Lost her Sheep. She then returned to complete the season at the St James's in Cupid's Ladder and the fairy spectacle, The Swan and Edgar.

== Star dancer ==
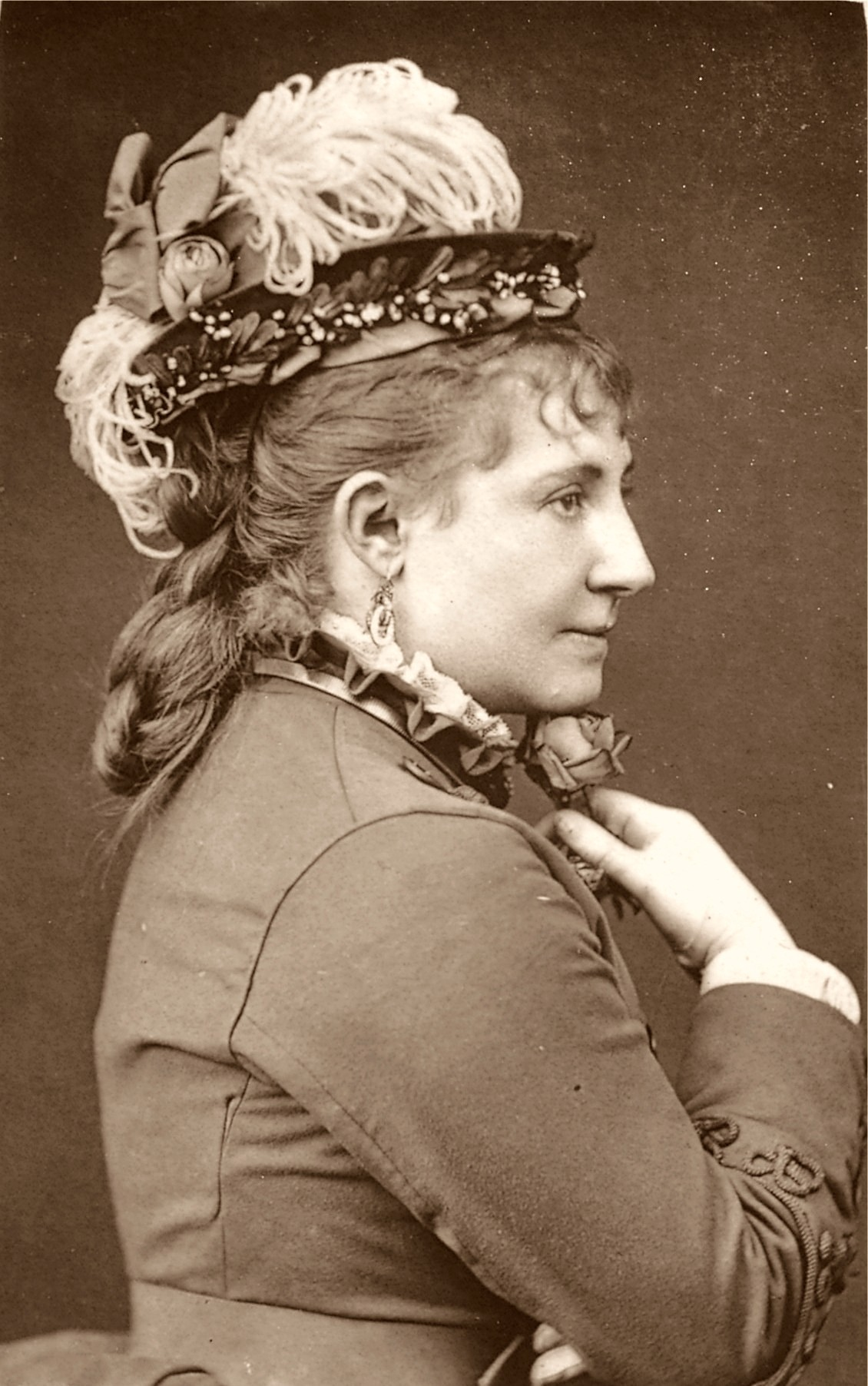
Lydia Thompson

Still a teenager, Thompson toured through Europe for over three years. She danced in Russia, Germany, Austria, France, Scandinavia and elsewhere, "winning acclaim for the dexterity of her dancing – which included the Highland Fling and Hornpipe – as well as the charms of her person and the vivacity of her character." She returned to England in the summer of 1859, by which time The Times referred to her as "one of the most eminent of English dancers."

In the winter season of 1859–60, Thompson danced at the St James's in several pieces, including Virginius, or, The Trials of a Fond Papa, Lester Buckingham's burlesque Virginus, Valentine in Magic Toys, Dolly Mayflower in Black-Eyed Susan and Young Norval in the ballet-burlesque My Name is Norval. In 1860, Thompson performed at Dublin's Queen's Theatre. In 1860–1861, at the Lyceum Theatre, she played again in Magic Toys, as Morgiana in the Savage Club burlesque of The Forty Thieves, in the farce The Middy Asthore, as Fanchette in George Loder's The Pets of the Parterre (Les Fleurs animées) and as Mephisto in the fairy extravaganza Chrystabelle, or the Rose Without a Thorn. She also played Norah in the first production of Edmund Falconer's comedy Woman, or, Love Against the World, as Blondinette in Little Red Riding Hood and had a role in the William Brough burlesque of The Colleen Bawn, called The Colleen Bawn Settled at Last.

Thompson married John Christian Tilbury, a riding-master, on 3 January 1863 in London, and soon gave birth to a daughter. She returned to the stage in The Alabama at the Theatre Royal, Drury Lane. In 1864, 15 months after their wedding, Tilbury died in a steeplechasing accident.

In 1864, at the opening of the new Theatre Royal, Birkenhead, managed by Alexander Henderson, she created the title role in a burlesque of Ixion by F. C. Burnand. She joined Henderson's company at Prince of Wales's Theatre, Liverpool, together with the rising young actors Squire Bancroft, Marie Wilton and Henry Irving. There, she played in Brough's Ernani (1865), as Max in a burlesque of Weber's Der Freischütz (1866), as Prince Buttercup in The White Fawn, as Massaroni in the burlesque The Brigand and as Prince Florizel in another burlesque, Perdita. Thompson excelled as "principal boy" in burlesques: "She was charming to look at, a good singer, a really clever dancer, and the life and soul of the scene while on the stage." Other successful London runs from 1866 to 1868 included Sophonisba in Delibes' Wanted Husbands For Six (Six Demoiselles à marier) at the Drury Lane and, at the Strand Theatre, Blue-Beard (after Jacques Offenbach's version) and Darnley in the successful The Field of the Cloth of Gold.

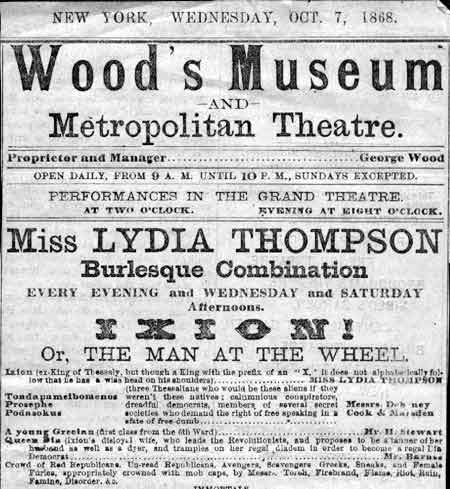
1868 advertisement for Ixion

== America and later years ==
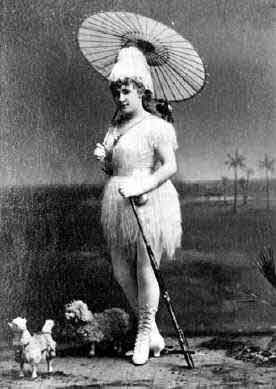
Thompson in Robinson Crusoe, c. 1870

She headed a small theatrical troupe, adapting popular English burlesques for middle-class New York audiences by adding topical and local references and reworking the lyrics of popular songs. The genre of burlesque was novel in America. Thompson's adaptations preserved the rhymed couplets and comic puns of the burlesque form and its wit, parody, song, dance, spectacle, music and featured strong, clever women characters. Thompson's first American show in 1868, her version of F. C. Burnand's 1863 burlesque Ixion, was a strong success. Nearly a half century later, an article in the New York Clipper recalled: "The present school of burlesque originated with Lydia Thompson."

Thompson became engaged to Henderson, and together they sailed in August 1868 to the United States. Thompson's troupe, called the "British Blondes", was the most popular entertainment in New York during the 1868–1869 theatrical season: "The eccentricities of pantomime and burlesque – with their curious combination of comedy, parody, satire, improvisation, song and dance, variety acts, cross-dressing, extravagant stage effects, risqué jokes and saucy costumes – while familiar enough to British audiences, took New York by storm." The six-month tour was extended to almost six years, and during two subsequent tours the British Blondes drew large crowds at leading theatres across the US. The troupe launched the careers of several actors, including Markham, Alice Burville, Lisa Weber and Rose Coghlan, and of comedian Willie Edouin. It also drew fierce criticism from those who felt it transgressed the boundaries of propriety. Burlesques, colloquially referred to as leg-shows, started off tame, clever and sophisticated, drawing in all types of people, especially women. Unfortunately, “the female audiences for burlesque did not last for long. In the summer of 1869 a wave of ‘anti-burlesque hysteria’ in the New York press frightened away the middle-class audiences that had initially been drawn to Ixion and sent the Thompson troupe prematurely packing for a national tour”. After this untimely closure, the hatred toward American burlesque continued to grow. Thompson's shows were described as a “disgraceful spectacle of padded legs jiggling and wriggling in the insensate follies and indecencies of the hour”. Times called their shows “an idiotic parody of masculinity”. Shakespeare scholar Richard Grant White, called burlesque “monstrously incongruous and unnatural”. The New York Times constantly expressed its disgust of burlesque, even headlining an article with the plea “Exit British Burlesque”.

Reflections on the virtue of her dancers by Wilbur F. Storey, the owner of the Chicago Times, led Thompson and her troupe first to post notices calling Storey "a liar and a coward" and appealing for the sympathy of the people. Then, on 24 February 1870, Thompson, Henderson and her colleague, Pauline Markham, horsewhipped Storey at gunpoint, for which they were arrested and fined. Thompson told a reporter that Storey "had called her by the most odious epithet that could be applied to a woman, and she could stand it no longer. She was glad at what she had done." This resulted in more publicity and popularity for the troupe. Actress Olive Logan protested, "I cannot advise any woman to go upon the stage with the demoralizing influence which seems here to prevail more every day, when its greatest rewards are won by brazen-faced, stained, yellow-haired, padded-limbed creatures, while actresses of the old school – well trained, decent – cannot earn a living." Thompson continued her tour to California and Nevada.

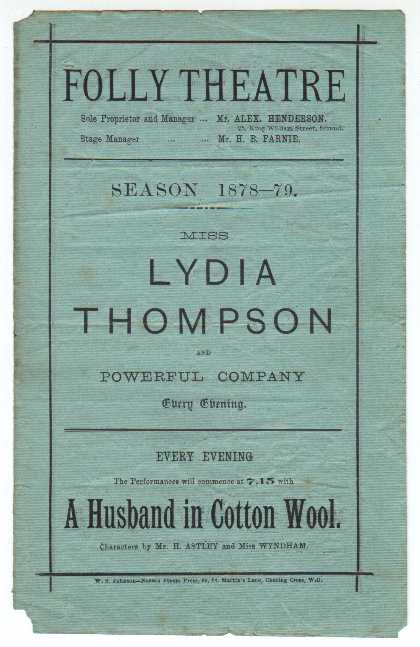
programme for the Folly Theatre

Thompson married Henderson on 28 July 1873 in Westminster. They and her troupe finally returned to England in 1874, and she resumed her starring roles in London and provincial productions, including H. B. Farnie's burlesques of Bluebeard (which she had already made a hit in America) and Robinson Crusoe, and Robert Reece's Carmen, or, Sold for a Song, as well as Piff-Paff (Le Grand Duc de Matapa), Oxygen, The Lady of Lyons, Pluto! and other burlesques. In her production of Bluebeard, she received a review in the Illustrated Sporting and Dramatic News saying, “the acting of Miss Lydia Thompson not even the most fastidious can find fault. Her chic amuses, her abandon bewitches, her personal charms delight and indeed, in all she does, whether speaking, singing or dancing she exercises over her audiences an influence which is perfectly irresistible, taking by storm the hearts of all who see and hear her.” The author christens Thompson the savior of the once-dying art form of burlesque, saying, “The name of Miss Lydia Thompson has acted as a spell and has charmed the apparently dead back to life.”

Henderson purchased the Folly Theatre in 1876, and it became a burlesque house, with Thompson in the lead roles. The first piece was a production of Bluebeard. In the following years, Thompson returned to America several times, where she remained popular. Thompson separated from Henderson, but the two continued to work together into the 1880s. In 1881, after two years in retirement, she returned to the stage as Mrs Kingfisher in the farce Dust.

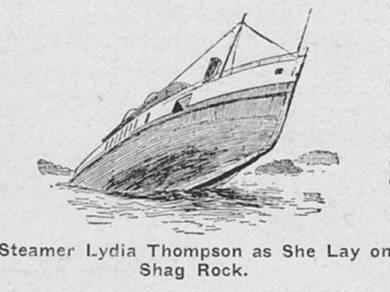
Shipwrecked steamer named Lydia Thompson in 1905 ad for the Alaska Company, Inc. of Seattle

Thompson returned to New York following the death of Henderson in 1886 and again in the winter seasons of 1888 and 1891. In 1887 she opened at the Royal Strand Theatre, London, under her own management, in Alfred Cellier's comic opera, The Sultan of Mocha. She next starred in the French vaudeville-opérette Babette (1888, Antonio), but her voice was judged inadequate. After this, her career began to decline. Her last American performances were in 1894 in The Crust of Society in a supporting role. Back in London, George Edwardes cast her briefly in the Edwardian musical comedy An Artist's Model (1895), but by 1899, she had depleted her funds. A London benefit night was held for her on 2 May 1899 at the Lyceum Theatre, when she performed in The Wedding March by W. S. Gilbert. She also recited a rhymed "farewell address" written for her by Gilbert. Her final performances were in 1904, as the Duchesse du Albuquerque in A Queen's Romance.

Thompson died in London at the age of 70. She is buried in Kensal Green cemetery. Her daughter, Zeffie Agnes Lydia Tilbury, became an actor known first on the London stage and later for playing wise or evil older characters in films, such as Grandma in The Grapes of Wrath (1940) and Grandma Lester in Tobacco Road (1941).
