= The Everly Brothers discography =

Cataloging of published recordings by The Everly Brothers

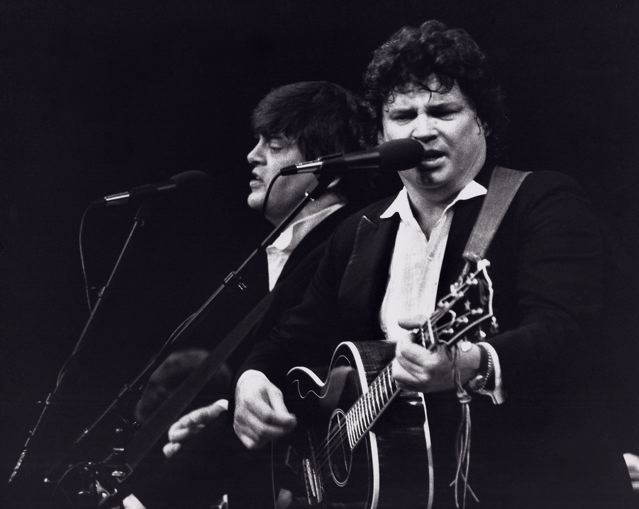
- The Everly Brothers performing in New York, circa 1980s
- Studio albums: 21
- Live albums: 2
- Compilation albums: 29
- Singles: 75
- No.1 Single: 11

This article presents the discography of American singing duo the Everly Brothers. During their recording career, which stretched between 1956 and 1998, they released 21 studio albums, two live albums, 29 compilation albums and 75 singles.

== Studio albums ==
=== 1950s ===
Title	Details	Peak chart positions	
Title	Details	US	UK
The Everly Brothers	Release date: December 1957; Label: Cadence Records	16	—
Songs Our Daddy Taught Us	Release date: December 1958; Label: Cadence Records	—	—

=== 1960s ===
Title	Details	Peak chart positions	
Title	Details	US	UK
It's Everly Time	Release date: May 1960; Label: Warner Bros. Records	9	2
A Date with the Everly Brothers	Release date: October 1960; Label: Warner Bros. Records	9	3
Both Sides of an Evening	Release date: August 1961; Label: Warner Bros. Records	—	—
Instant Party!	Release date: January 1962; Label: Warner Bros. Records	—	20
Christmas with the Everly Brothers	Release date: November 1962; Label: Warner Bros. Records	—	—
The Everly Brothers Sing Great Country Hits	Release date: October 1963; Label: Warner Bros. Records	—	—
Gone, Gone, Gone	Release date: December 1964; Label: Warner Bros. Records	—	—
Rock'n Soul	Release date: March 1965; Label: Warner Bros. Records	—	—
Beat & Soul	Release date: August 1965; Label: Warner Bros. Records	141	—
In Our Image	Release date: January 1966; Label: Warner Bros. Records	—	—
Two Yanks in England	Release date: July 1966; Label: Warner Bros. Records	—	—
The Hit Sound of the Everly Brothers	Release date: February 1967; Label: Warner Bros. Records	—	—
The Everly Brothers Sing	Release date: July 1967; Label: Warner Bros. Records	—	—
Roots	Release date: December 1968; Label: Warner Bros. Records	—	—
"—" denotes releases that did not chart

=== 1970s–1980s ===
Title	Details	Peak chart positions			
Title	Details	US	US Country	CAN	UK
Stories We Could Tell	Release date: March 1972; Label: RCA Victor	—	—	—	—
Pass the Chicken & Listen	Release date: December 1972; Label: RCA Victor	—	—	—	—
EB 84	Release date: September 1984; Label: Mercury Records	38	24	90	36
Born Yesterday	Release date: January 1986; Label: Mercury Records	83	22	82	—
Some Hearts	Release date: November 1988; Label: Mercury Records	—	—	—	—
"—" denotes releases that did not chart

== Live albums ==
Title	Details	Peak chart positions	
Title	Details	US	UK
The Everly Brothers Show	Release date: July 1970; Label: Warner Bros. Records	—	—
The Everly Brothers Reunion Concert	Release date: 1983; Label: Passport Records	162	47
Everly Brothers Live	Release date: 1996; Label: BCI Music	—	—
The Everly Brothers Live in Paris 1963	Release date: 1997; Label: Big Beat Records	—	—
"—" denotes releases that did not chart

== Compilation albums ==
=== Unreleased material ===
Title	Details
The New Album	Release date: October 1977; Label: Warner Bros. Records
Too Good to Be True	Release date: June 14, 2005; Label: Varèse Sarabande
Give Me a Future	Release date: September 27, 2005; Label: Varèse Sarabande

=== Previously released material and box sets ===
Title	Details	Peak chart positions		Certifications (sales threshold)
Title	Details	US	US Country	Certifications (sales threshold)
The Best of The Everly Brothers	Release date: 1959; Label: Cadence Records	—	—	
The Fabulous Style of The Everly Brothers	Release date: 1960; Label: Cadence Records	23	—	
Souvenir Sampler	Release date: 1961; Label: Warner Bros. Records	—	—	
The Golden Hits of The Everly Brothers	Release date: 1962; Label: Warner Bros. Records	35	—	
Folk Songs of The Everly Brothers	Release date: 1962; Label: Cadence Records	—	—	
15 Everly Hits	Release date: 1963; Label: Cadence Records	—	—	
The Very Best of The Everly Brothers (features re-recordings of Cadence Hits)	Release date: 1964; Label: Warner Bros. Records	—	—	US: Gold; UK: Gold
Wake Up Little Susie	Release date: 1969; Label: Harmony Records	—	—	
Chained to a Memory (re-release of In Our Image)	Release date: 1970; Label: Harmony Records	—	—	
Original Greatest Hits	Release date: 1970; Label: Barnaby Records	180	44	
Living Legends	Release date: 1972; Label: Warwick Records	—	—	
Don't Worry Baby	Release date: 1973; Label: Capitol Records	—	—	
The History of The Everly Brothers	Release date: 1973; Label: Barnaby Records	—	—	
The Everly Brothers' Greatest Hits	Release date: 1974; Label: Barnaby Records	—	—	
Wake Up Again	Release date: 1974; Label: GRT Records	—	—	
Everlys	Release date: 1975; Label: RCA Records	—	—	
Greatest Hits Vol. I	Release date: 1977; Label: Barnaby Records	—	—	
Greatest Hits Vol. II	Release date: 1977; Label: Barnaby Records	—	—	
Greatest Hits Vol. III	Release date: 1977; Label: Barnaby Records	—	—	
The Everly Brothers	Release date: 1981; Label: Teldec	—	—	
The Sensational Everly Brothers	Release date: 1982; Label: Reader's Digest	—	—	ARIA: Gold
Everly Brothers 24 Original Classics	Release date: 1984; Label: Arista Records	—	—	
Home Again	Release date: 1985; Label: RCA Victor	—	—	
All They Had to Do Was Dream	Release date: 1985; Label: Rhino Entertainment	—	—	
Cadence Classics: Their 20 Greatest Hits	Release date: 1985; Label: Rhino Entertainment	—	—	
The Everly Brothers	Release date: 1988; Label: Castle Records	—	—	
Classic Everly Brothers	Release date: 1992; Label: Bear Family Records	—	—	
Walk Right Back on Warner Bros. 1960–1969	Release date: 1993; Label: Warner Bros. Records	—	—	
Heartaches and Harmonies	Release date: 1994; Label: Rhino Entertainment	—	—	
Stories We Could Tell:The RCA Years	Release date: 2003; Label: Bertelsmann Music Group	—	—	
Studio Outtakes	Release date: 2005; Label: Bear Family Records	—	—	
The Price of Fame	Release date: 2005; Label: Bear Family Records	—	—	
Chained to a Memory	Release date: 2006; Label: Bear Family Records	—	—	
Country: The Everly Brothers	Release date: 2012; Label: Sony Music Entertainment	—	40	
"—" denotes releases that did not chart

== Singles ==
=== 1950s ===
Year	Single	Peak chart positions						Certifications (sales threshold)	Album
Year	Single	US	US Country	US R&B	AUS	CAN	UK	Certifications (sales threshold)	Album
1956	"Keep A-Lovin' Me"	—	—	—	—	—	—		—N/a
1957	"Bye Bye Love" / "I Wonder If I Care as Much"	2 —	1 —	5 —	14 —	2 —	6 —	US: Gold	The Everly Brothers
1957	"Wake Up Little Susie"	1	1	1	3	1	2	US: Gold	The Everly Brothers
1958	"This Little Girl of Mine" / "Should We Tell Him"	26; 26	4; 10	— —	— —	— 14	— —		The Everly Brothers
1958	"All I Have to Do Is Dream" / "Claudette"	1; 30	1; 15	1 —	3 —	1; 26	1; 1	US: Gold	The Everly Brothers' Best
1958	"Bird Dog" / "Devoted to You"	2; 10	1; 7	2; 2	1; 25	1; 1	2 —	US: Gold	The Everly Brothers' Best
1958	"Brand New Heartache"	—	—	—	—	9	—		The Everly Brothers
1958	"Problems" / "Love of My Life"	2; 40	17 —	— —	12 —	5; 5	6 —		The Everly Brothers' Best
1959	"Rip It Up"	—	—	—	57	—	—		The Everly Brothers
1959	"Take a Message to Mary" / "Poor Jenny"	16; 22	— —	— —	2; 22	8; 8	20; 14		The Fabulous Style of The Everly Brothers
1959	"(Till) I Kissed You"	4	8	22	2	3	2		The Fabulous Style of The Everly Brothers
1959	"Let It Be Me"	7	—	—	24	8	13		The Fabulous Style of The Everly Brothers
"—" denotes releases that did not chart

=== 1960s ===
Year	Single	Peak chart positions						Certifications (sales threshold)	Album
Year	Single	US	US AC	US R&B	AUS	CAN	UK	Certifications (sales threshold)	Album
1960	"Cathy's Clown" / "Always It's You"	1; 56	— —	1 —	3 —	2 —	1 —	US: Gold	A Date with The Everly Brothers
1960	"When Will I Be Loved" / "Be-Bop-A-Lula"	8; 74	— —	— —	3 —	16 —	4 —		The Fabulous Style of The Everly Brothers
1960	"So Sad (To Watch Good Love Go Bad)" / "Lucille"	7; 21	— —	16 —	19; 19	18; 18	4; 4		It's Everly Time
1960	"Like Strangers" / "Brand New Heartache"	22; 109	— —	— —	39 —	32; 32	11 —		The Fabulous Style of The Everly Brothers
1961	"Walk Right Back" / "Ebony Eyes"	7; 8	— 25	— 25	8; 8	3; 3	1; 1		The Golden Hits of The Everly Brothers
1961	"Temptation" / "Stick with Me Baby"	27; 41	— —	— —	4 —	12; 12	1 —		The Golden Hits of The Everly Brothers
1961	"Don't Blame Me" / "Muskrat"	20; 82	— —	— —	26; 26	— —	20; 20		Both Sides of an Evening
1962	"Crying in the Rain"	6	—	—	7	25	6		The Golden Hits of The Everly Brothers
1962	"That's Old Fashioned (That's the Way Love Should Be)" / "How Can I Meet Her?"	9; 75	4 —	— —	8; 8	18; 18	— 12		The Golden Hits of The Everly Brothers
1962	"I'm Here to Get My Baby Out of Jail"	76	—	—	94	—	—		Songs Our Daddy Taught Us
1962	"Don't Ask Me to Be Friends" / "No One Can Make My Sunshine Smile"	48; 117	16 —	— —	59; 59	— —	— 11		—N/a
1963	"Nancy's Minuet" / "(So It Was, So It Is) So It Always Will Be"	107; 116	— —	— —	— —	— —	— 23		—N/a
1963	"It's Been Nice (Goodnight)"	101	—	—	98	—	26		—N/a
1963	"The Girl Sang the Blues" / "Love Her"	— 117	— —	— —	39 —	— —	25 —		—N/a
1964	"Ain't That Lovin' You, Baby"	133	—	—	—	—	—		Gone, Gone, Gone
1964	"The Ferris Wheel"	72	—	—	—	—	22		Gone, Gone, Gone
1964	"You're the One I Love"	—	—	—	—	—	—		—N/a
1964	"Gone, Gone, Gone"	31	—	—	30	19	36		Gone, Gone, Gone
1965	"You're My Girl"	110	—	—	—	—	—		—N/a
1965	"That'll Be the Day"	111	—	—	—	45	30		Rock 'N Soul
1965	"The Price of Love"	104	—	—	—	—	2		In Our Image
1965	"I'll Never Get Over You"	—	—	—	—	—	35		In Our Image
1965	"Love Is Strange"	128	—	—	—	—	11		Beat 'N Soul
1965	"It's All Over"	—	—	—	—	—	—		In Our Image
1966	"The Dollhouse Is Empty"	—	—	—	—	—	—		In Our Image
1966	"(You Got) The Power of Love"	—	—	—	—	—	—		In Our Image
1966	"Somebody Help Me"	—	—	—	—	—	—		Two Yanks in England
1967	"Fifi the Flea"	—	—	—	—	—	—		Two Yanks in England
1967	"The Devil's Child"	—	—	—	—	—	—		The Hit Sound of The Everly Brothers
1967	"Bowling Green"	40	—	—	—	1	—		The Everly Brothers Sing
1967	"Mary Jane"	—	—	—	—	—	—		The Everly Brothers Sing
1967	"Love of the Common People"	114	—	—	70	4	—		—N/a
1968	"It's My Time"	112	—	—	—	28	39		—N/a
1968	"Milk Train"	—	—	—	98	—	—		—N/a
1969	"T for Texas"	—	—	—	—	—	—		Roots
1969	"I'm On My Way Home Again"	—	—	—	—	—	—		—N/a
1969	"Carolina in My Mind"	—	—	—	—	—	—		—N/a
"—" denotes releases that did not chart

=== 1970s–1990s ===
Year	Single	Peak chart positions							Album
Year	Single	US	US Country	US AC	AUS	CAN Country	CAN AC	UK	Album
1970	"Yves"	—	—	—	—	—	—	—	—N/a
1972	"Ridin' High"	—	—	—	—	—	—	—	Stories We Could Tell
1973	"Lay It Down"	—	—	—	—	—	—	—	Pass the Chicken & Listen
1973	"Not Fade Away"	—	—	—	—	—	—	—	Pass the Chicken & Listen
1984	"On the Wings of a Nightingale"	50	49	9	78	39	10	41	EB 84
1985	"The First in Line"	—	44	—	—	—	—	—	EB 84
1986	"Born Yesterday"	—	17	17	—	7	12	—	Born Yesterday
1986	"I Know Love" / "These Shoes"	—	56; 57	—	—	—	—	—	Born Yesterday
1988	"Don't Worry Baby"	—	—	—	86	—	—	—	Some Hearts
1998	"Cold"	—	—	—	—	—	—	—	Whistle Down the Wind
"—" denotes releases that did not chart

=== Guest singles ===
Year	Single	Artist	Peak positions	Album
Year	Single	Artist	US Country	Album
1989	"Ballad of a Teenage Queen"	Johnny Cash (with Rosanne Cash)	45	Water from the Wells of Home

=== Billboard Year-End performances ===
Year	Song	Year-End Position
1957	"Bye Bye Love"	11
1957	"Wake Up Little Susie"	19
1958	"All I Have to Do Is Dream" / "Claudette"	2
1958	"Bird Dog" / "Devoted to You"	13
1959	"(Till) I Kissed You"	20
1959	"Take a Message to Mary"	96
1960	"Cathy's Clown"	3
1960	"Let It Be Me"	30
1960	"So Sad (To Watch Good Love Go Bad)"	70
1960	"When Will I Be Loved"	91
1961	"Walk Right Back"	57
1962	"Crying in the Rain"	47

== Don Everly ==
=== Albums ===
Title	Details
Don Everly	Release date: January 1971; Label: Ode Records
Sunset Towers	Release date: August 1974; Label: Ode Records
Brother Jukebox	Release date: March 1977; Label: Hickory Records

=== Singles ===
Year	Single	Peak chart positions		Album
Year	Single	US Country	US	Album
1970	"Tumblin' Tumbleweeds"	—	—	Don Everly
1974	"Warmin' Up the Band"	—	110	Sunset Towers
1976	"Yesterday Just Passed My Way Again"	50	—	Brother Jukebox
1977	"Love at Last Sight"	—	—	Brother Jukebox
1977	"Since You Broke My Heart"	84	—	Brother Jukebox
1977	"Brother Jukebox"	96	—	Brother Jukebox
1981	"Let's Put Our Hearts Together"	—	—	—N/a
"—" denotes releases that did not chart

== Phil Everly ==
=== Albums ===
Title	Details
Star Spangled Springer	Release date: June 1973; Label: RCA Records
Phil's Diner	Release date: December 1974; Label: Pye Records
Mystic Line	Release date: October 1975; Label: Pye Records
Living Alone	Release date: August 1979; Label: Elektra Records
Phil Everly	Release date: April 1983; Label: Capitol Records

=== Singles ===
Year	Single	Peak chart positions					Album
Year	Single	US Country	US AC	CAN Country	AUS	UK	Album
1973	"God Bless Older Ladies (For They Made Rock & Roll)"	—	—	—	—	—	Star Spangled Springer
1973	"The Air That I Breathe"	—	—	—	—	—	Star Spangled Springer
1974	"Old Kentucky River"	—	—	—	—	—	Phil's Diner
1975	"New Old Song"	—	—	—	—	—	Phil's Diner
1975	"Words in Your Eyes"	—	—	—	—	—	Mystic Line
1979	"Living Alone"	—	—	—	—	—	Living Alone
1979	"You Broke It"	—	—	—	—	—	Living Alone
1980	"Dare to Dream Again"	63	9	—	—	—	—N/a
1981	"Sweet Southern Love"	52	42	—	—	—	—N/a
1982	"Louise"	—	—	—	—	47	Phil Everly
1983	"Who's Gonna Keep Me Warm"	37	—	40	—	—	Phil Everly
1983	"She Means Nothing to Me" (with Cliff Richard)	—	—	—	39	9	Phil Everly
1983	"Sweet Pretender"	—	—	—	—	79	Phil Everly
1992	"On Top of the World" (with René Shuman)	—	—	—	—	—	—N/a
1994	"All I Have to Do Is Dream" (with Cliff Richard)	—	—	—	93	14	—N/a
"—" denotes releases that did not chart

== See also ==
- List of songs recorded by the Everly Brothers
