= The Song We Fell in Love To =

Studio album by Connie Smith
- Released: March 1976
- Recorded: June 11 – September 8, 1975
- Studio: Columbia Studio B
- Genre: Country; country pop
- Label: Columbia
- Producer: Ray Baker

Connie Smith chronology
Joy to the World (1975)	The Song We Fell in Love To (1976)	I Don't Wanna Talk It Over Anymore (1976)

Singles from The Song We Fell in Love To
- 1. "The Song We Fell in Love To" Released: September 1975; 2. "(Till) I Kissed You" Released: January 1976

The Song We Fell in Love To is the twenty-seventh solo studio album by American country singer Connie Smith. It was released in March 1976 on Columbia Records. The album contained ten tracks of material crafted in a country pop style that featured overdubbed vocal harmonies by Smith herself. Two singles were included on the project: the title track and a cover of The Everly Brothers's "(Till) I Kissed You". The latter single became Smith's first top ten American single in several years. The album itself peaked in the top 40 of the American Country LP's chart in 1976.

== Background ==
After 18 top ten singles with the RCA Victor label, Connie Smith signed a new contract with Columbia Records in the early 1970s. She would continue to have commercial success, but most of her singles placed in the top 20. Her top ten and 20 singles at Columbia included "Ain't Love a Good Thing" (1973), "I Never Knew (What That Song Meant Before)" (1974), "I've Got My Baby on My Mind" (1975) and "Why Don't You Love Me" (1975). In 1975, Smith began recording her next Columbia studio project, which would later be titled The Song We Fell in Love To. The album's name was derived from its title track, which was issued as a single. The single's country pop production style helped form the sound for the project.

== Recording and content ==
Smith went into the studio in the summer of 1975 to make The Song We Fell in Love To. Specifically, the album was recorded over three studio sessions: June 11, August 14 and September 8, 1975. Two overdub sessions were also added that featured string instrumentation and vocal harmonies. The album was cut at Columbia Studio B, located in Nashville, Tennessee. Ray Baker served as the project's producer and had been serving as Smith's producer since 1973. Baker and Tupper Saussy collaborated to compose the project's title track. "We had an idea and sat down and wrote 'The Song We Fell in Love To,' and it came off really well, with a good melody; the words were good too," Baker remembered. Smith recalled liking the song after hearing it and agreed to record it.

Along with the title track, the album consisted of ten songs. Three songs on the album were penned by Dallas Frazier: "Because I Love You That's Why", "Ridin' on a Rainbow" and "Viva La Love". On both "Ridin' on a Rainbow" and "Viva La Love", Smith harmonized with herself by overdubbing her vocals. Singer-songwriter Don Gibson penned the track "Nothing in This World". Ray Baker had Smith re-record her 1964 number one debut single, "Once a Day". "We got a good record on it, but, really, the one that she'd done with Bob Ferguson [her RCA producer] was magic – and her career maker," Baker recalled. Smith also chose The Everly Brothers's pop single for the project, "(Till) I Kissed You". "It had been long enough that it just needed to be heard again," she commented. Per Smith's contract agreement, she was allowed to include two gospel songs onto her secular albums. For The Song We Fell in Love To, she included the songs "Jesus Hears, He Cares, He Can" and "When I Need Jesus, He's There".

== Release and singles ==
The Song We Fell in Love To was released by Columbia Records in March 1976. It was the twenty ninth studio album of Smith's career and her seventh with the Columbia label. The label distributed the album as a vinyl LP, with five songs on either side of the record. The album debuted on the American Billboard Country LP's chart on March 27, 1976. It spent six weeks on the chart and peaked at number 34 on April 10, 1976. Two singles were included on the project. Its first was the title track, which was released as a single by Columbia in September 1975. It peaked in the top 40 of the Billboard Hot Country Songs chart in November 1975, climbing to the number 29 position. Smith's cover of "(Till) I Kissed You" was issued as a single in January 1976. By April 1976, the song became Smith's twentieth top ten single on the Billboard country chart, peaking at number 10. It was also her first Billboard top ten single since 1974. In Canada, "(Till) I Kissed You" became her second single to reach number one on their RPM country chart.

== Track listing ==
Side one
No.	Title	Writer(s)	Length
1.	"The Song We Fell in Love To"	Ray Baker; Tupper Saussy	2:23
2.	"Because I Love You That's Why"	Dallas Frazier	2:10
3.	"Jesus Hears, He Cares, He Can"	Ray Lewis	3:14
4.	"Ridin' on a Rainbow"	Frazier; Larry Lee	2:39
5.	"One Little Reason"	C. Davis; Clyde Pitts	2:25

Side two
No.	Title	Writer(s)	Length
1.	"(Till) I Kissed You"	Don Everly	2:32
2.	"Once a Day"	Bill Anderson	2:23
3.	"Viva La Love"	Frazier	2:50
4.	"Nothing in This World"	Don Gibson	2:30
5.	"When I Need Jesus He's There"	Lee Petrucci	3:09

== Personnel ==
All credits are adapted from the liner notes of The Song We Fell in Love To and the biography booklet by Barry Mazor titled The Latest Shade of Blue.

Musical personnel

- Byron Bach – Strings
- Brenton Banks – Strings
- George Binkley III – Strings
- Marvin Chantry – Strings
- Roy Christensen – Strings
- Ray Edenton – Rhythm guitar
- Johnny Gimble – Fiddle
- Carl Gorodetzky – Strings
- Lloyd Green – Steel guitar
- The Jordanaires – Background vocals
- Shayne Keister – Electric piano
- Shelly Kurland – Strings
- Carol Lee Cooper – Organ
- Kenny Malone – Drums
- Grady Martin – Guitar, leader
- Charlie McCoy – Harmonica
- Bob Moore – Electric bass
- Weldon Myrick – Steel guitar
- The Nashville Edition – Background vocals
- Leon Rhodes – Guitar
- Hargus "Pig" Robbins – Piano
- Connie Smith – Lead vocals
- Steven Smith – Strings
- Buddy Spicher – Fiddle
- Pamela Stein – Strings
- Henry Strzelecki – Electric bass
- Bobby Thompson – Guitar
- Gary Van Osdale – Strings
- Stephanie Woolf – Strings

Technical personnel

- Ray Baker – Percussion, producer
- Bill Barnes – Design
- Lou Bradley – Engineer
- Al Clayton – Cover photo
- Jim Hall – Leader, string arrangement

== Chart performance ==
Chart (1976)	Peak position
US Top Country Albums (Billboard)	34

== Release history ==
Region	Date	Format	Label	Ref.
North America	March 1976	Vinyl	Columbia Records	
United Kingdom	March 1976	Vinyl	CBS Records International	
