= Phil Everly =

American singer-songwriter (1939–2014)

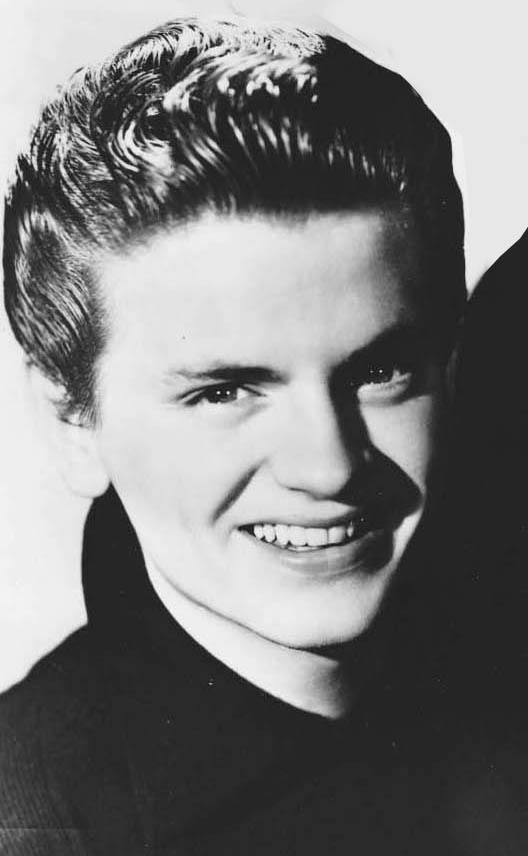
- Everly In 1958

Background information
- Born: Phillip Everly; January 19, 1939; Chicago, Illinois, U.S.
- Died: January 3, 2014 (aged 74) Burbank, California, U.S.
- Genres: Country; pop; rock
- Occupation: Musician
- Instruments: Guitar; vocals
- Years active: 1951–2007
- Formerly of: The Everly Brothers

Phillip Everly (January 19, 1939 – January 3, 2014) was an American musician, who was one half of the duo The Everly Brothers alongside his older brother Don.

== Early life ==
Phil was born in Chicago in 1939 to Isaac Milford "Ike" Everly Jr. (1908–1975), a guitar player, and Margaret Embry Everly (1919–2021). He was of German, English and Cherokee descent.

The Everly family moved to Knoxville, Tennessee, in 1953, where the brothers attended West High School. In 1955, the family moved to Madison, Tennessee, while the brothers moved to Nashville. Don had graduated from high school in 1955, and Phil attended Peabody Demonstration School, from which he graduated in 1957.

== Career ==
=== The Everly Brothers ===
The Everly Brothers Career started in 1951. They signed to Cadence Records In 1957. Their first hit was "Bye Bye Love", which had been rejected by 30 other acts.

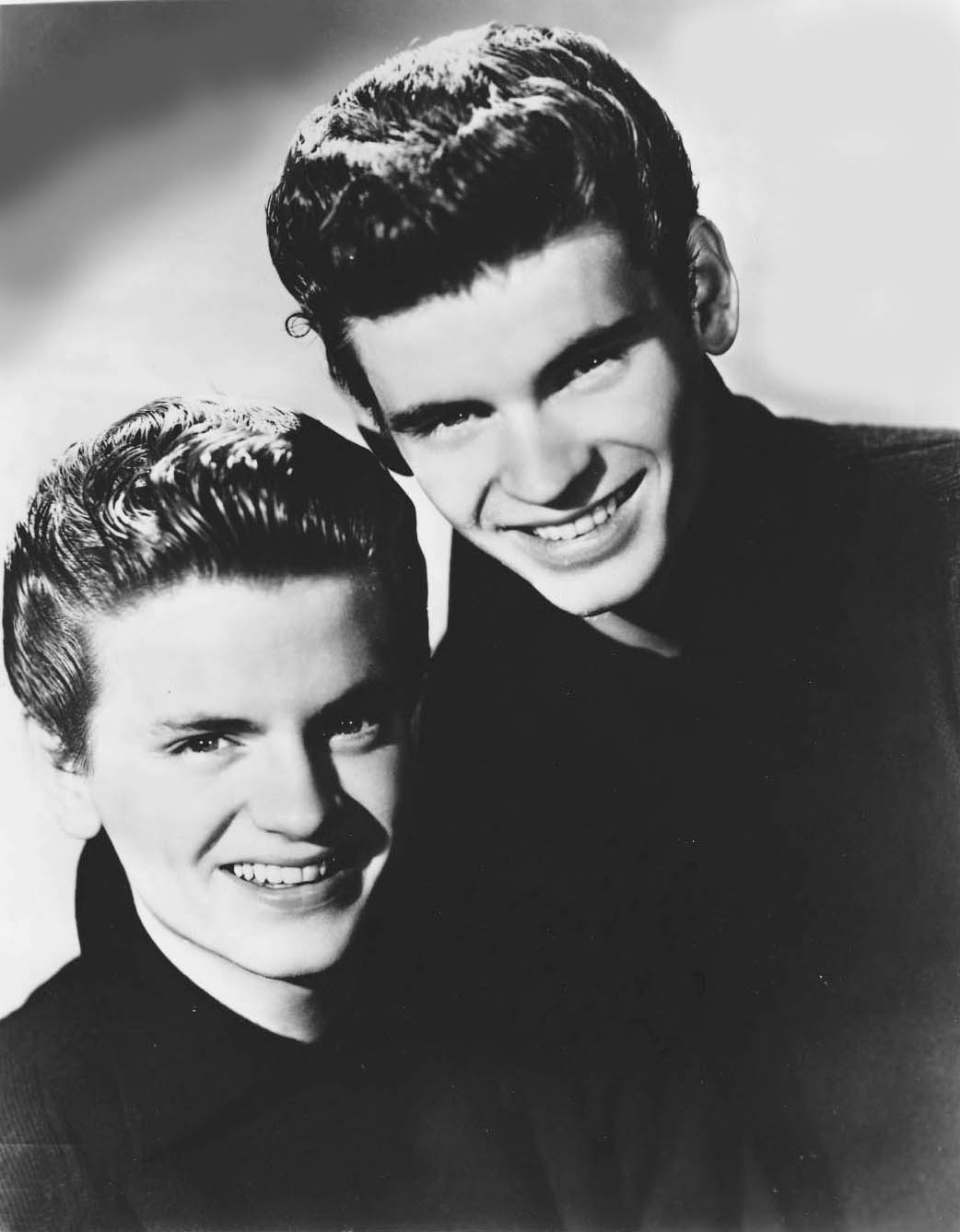
Phil (left) with Don in 1958

"Bye Bye Love" went to no. 2 on the pop chart, behind Elvis Presley's "(Let Me Be Your) Teddy Bear", and No. 1 on the country and No. 5 on the R&B charts. The song, by Felice and Boudleaux Bryant, became the Everly Brothers' first million-seller.

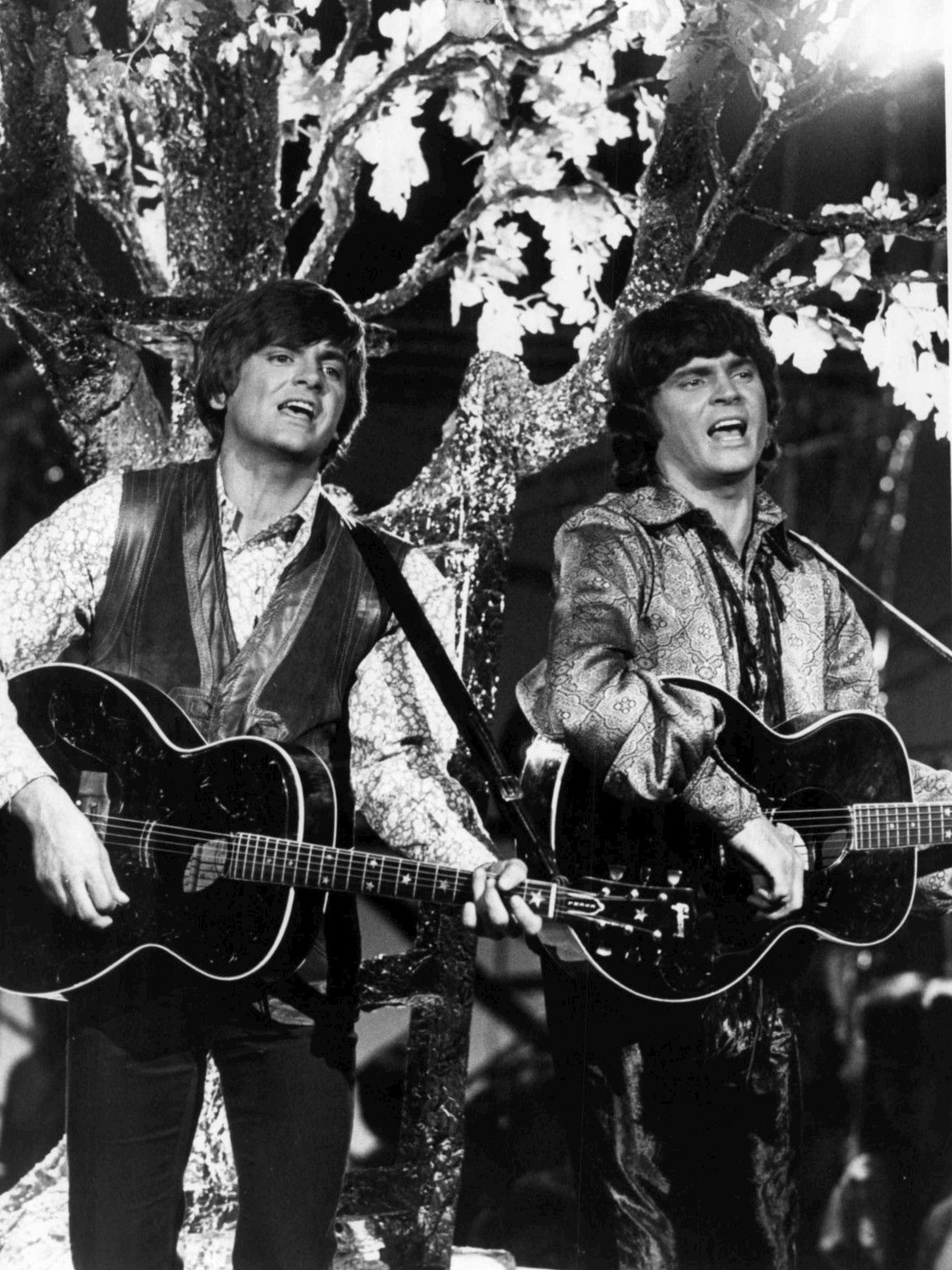
The Everly brothers in 1970

The Everly Brothers are remembered for other major charting hits such as "Cathy's Clown" and "All I Have to Do Is Dream". The brothers wrote some of their own material, both as a team and individually; Phil wrote the Everlys' top ten hit "When Will I Be Loved" solo, and collaborated with Don on such hits as "The Price of Love" (UK #2) and "Should We Tell Him" (US #26).

After the duo split following conflicts between the two brothers, Phil and Don pursued solo careers from 1973 to 1983. The brothers reunited at the Royal Albert Hall in London on September 23, 1983, which ended their ten-year-long hiatus. The event was initiated by Phil and Don alongside Terry Slater, with Pete Wingfield as musical director. This concert was recorded for a live LP and video broadcast on cable television in mid-January 1984. The brothers returned to the studio as a duo for the first time in over a decade, recording the album EB '84, produced by Dave Edmunds.

The Everly Brothers were inducted into the Rock and Roll Hall of Fame in 1986. They were the first duo and non-solo act to have been inducted. That same year, they received a star on the Hollywood Walk of Fame.

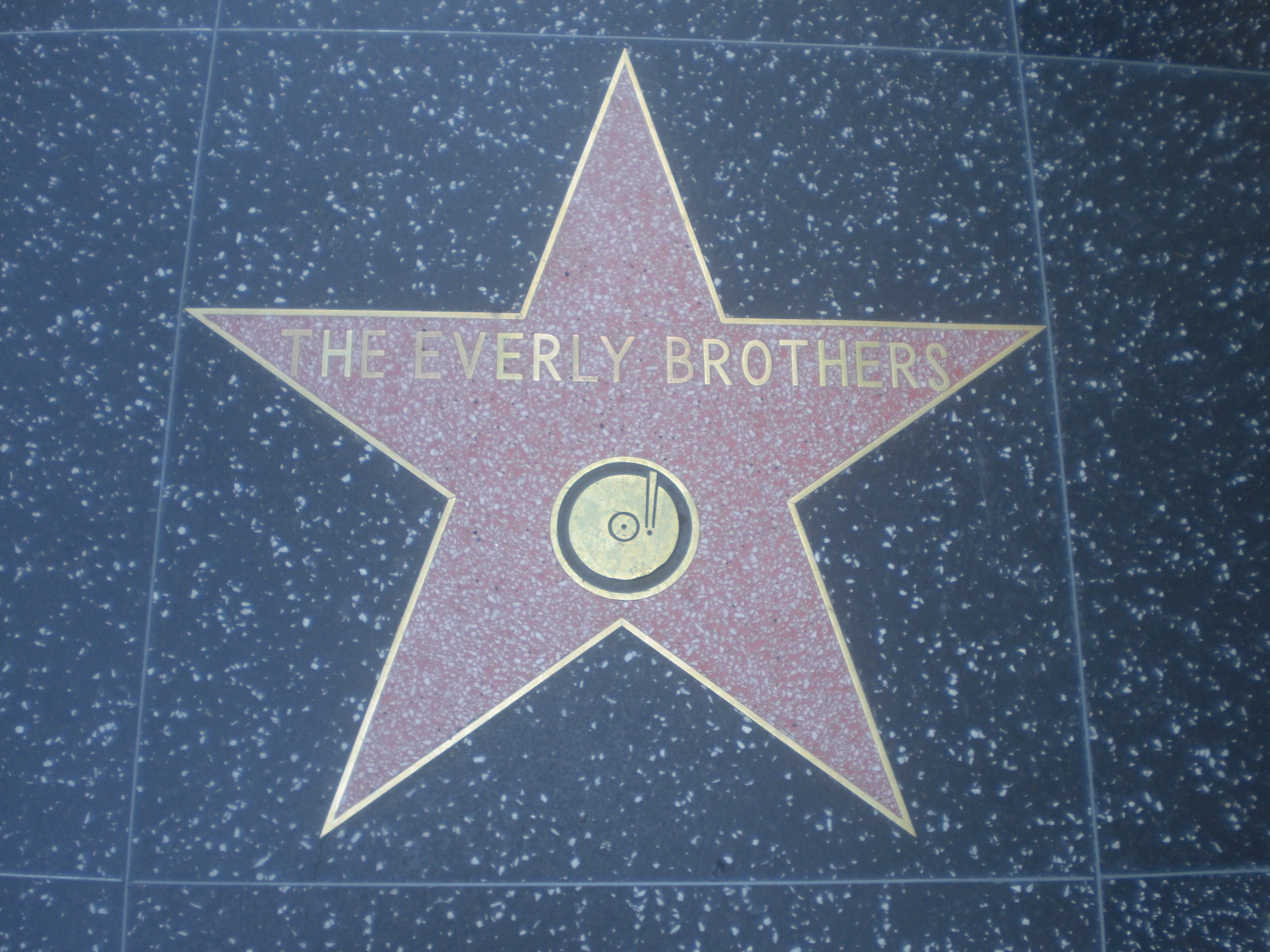
The Everly Brothers Hollywood Walk of Fame star

Their final charting single was 1986's "Born Yesterday". A 1981 live BBC recording of "All I Have to Do Is Dream", which featured Cliff Richard and Phil sharing vocals, was a UK Top 20 hit in 1994.

Paul McCartney has stated that the Everly Brothers were a major influence on the Beatles:

“They were one of the major influences on the Beatles. When John and I first started to write songs, I was Phil and he was Don.”

=== Solo work ===
Phil sang backup for Roy Wood's 1975 album Mustard and two songs for Warren Zevon's 1976 self-titled album.

While Zevon was part of Phil Everly's back-up band, Phil also suggested the title and subject matter for Zevon's breakthrough hit single "Werewolves of London".

Phil recorded more frequently, but with no chart success until the 1980s. He wrote "Don't Say You Don't Love Me No More", for the 1978 Clint Eastwood comedy film, Every Which Way but Loose, in which he performed it as a duet with the film's co-star Sondra Locke. Phil also wrote "One Too Many Women In Your Life" for the 1980 sequel, Any Which Way You Can, and played in the band which backed Locke.

In 1983, Phil had UK success as a solo artist with the album Phil Everly, recorded mainly in London. Musicians on the LP included Dire Straits guitarist Mark Knopfler, former Rockpile and Dire Straits drummer Terry Williams, and keyboard player Pete Wingfield. The track "She Means Nothing to Me”, written and composed by John David Williams and featuring Cliff Richard as co-lead vocalist, was a UK Top 10 hit, and "Louise", written and composed by Ian Gomm, reached the Top 50 in 1983.

In 1990, Phil recorded a duet with the Dutch singer René Shuman. "On Top of the World" was written and composed by Phil, who appeared in the music video they recorded in Los Angeles. The selection appeared on Shuman's album, Set the Clock on Rock.

Everly stopped performing in 2007.

== Personal life ==
Everly was married three times: first to Jacqueline Alice Ertel from 1963 to 1970, then Patricia Mickey from 1972 to 1978, and finally Patrice Arnold from 1999 until his death. He had two children, sons Jason and Chris.

== Death ==
Phil Everly died in Burbank, California on January 3, 2014, aged 74, from chronic obstructive pulmonary disease (COPD). His brother Don died in August 2021, and the Everly family matriarch, Margaret Embry Everly, died four months later in December, aged 102.

Phil's widow, Patti, blamed her husband's death on his smoking habit, which caused him to develop COPD; she recounted Phil's spending his final years having to carry oxygen tanks with him wherever he went and taking 20 different medications per day.

Paul McCartney posted about Everly's death on social media, stating:

“Phil Everly was one of my great heroes, with his brother Don, they were one of the major influences on the Beatles. When John and I first started to write songs, I was Phil and he was Don. Years later, when I finally met Phil, I was completely star-struck and at the same time extremely impressed by his humility and gentleness of soul. I will always love him for giving me some of the sweetest musical memories of my life.”

In a 2010 interview, Magne Furuholmen, keyboardist of a-ha, talked about the group's connection to the Everly Brothers and why a-ha released a cover of "Crying in the Rain" in 1990:

“Our manager Terry Slater had played bass for the Everly Brothers during the ’60s and was a close personal friend of Phil Everly. He also managed them during their comeback at the Royal Albert Hall in 1984 where we met the Everlys for the first time. Next Christmas they presented a-ha with three Everly Brothers guitars made from the same tree! Being huge Beatles fans, growing up and knowing how influential the Everly Brothers had been for the early Beatles’ sound, we thought that it would be a nice tribute to cover one of their hits.”

Upon Phil Everly's passing, a-ha stated on their official website that:

“«I'll do my crying in the rain»

– We were lucky enough in our lives to know Phil Everly a little, and we hope some of his dry humor and generosity have rubbed off on us all. His sweet voice will be sorely missed.

– A big branch has fallen, but together, or apart, the Everly Brothers have contributed to music that continues to inspire and fascinate new generations of music lovers all over the world.”

== Discography ==
=== Everly Brothers ===
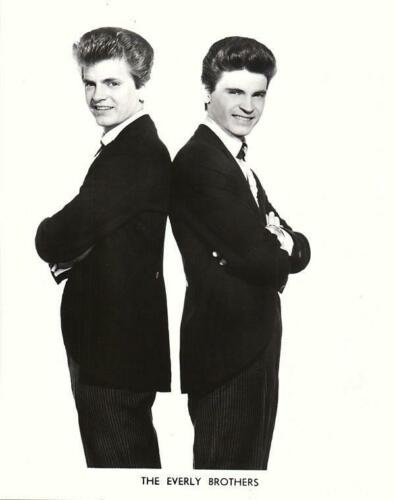
The Everly Brothers In 1965

=== Solo ===
==== Albums ====
Title	Details
Star Spangled Springer	Release date: June 1973; Label: RCA Records
Phil's Diner	Release date: December 1974; Label: Pye Records
Mystic Line	Release date: October 1975; Label: Pye Records
Living Alone	Release date: August 1979; Label: Elektra Records
Phil Everly	Release date: April 1983; Label: Capitol Records

==== Singles ====
Year	Single	Peak chart positions					Album
Year	Single	US Country	US AC	CAN Country	AUS	UK	Album
1973	"God Bless Older Ladies (For They Made Rock & Roll)"	—	—	—	—	—	Star Spangled Springer
1973	"The Air That I Breathe"	—	—	—	—	—	Star Spangled Springer
1974	"Old Kentucky River"	—	—	—	—	—	Phil's Diner
1975	"New Old Song"	—	—	—	—	—	Phil's Diner
1975	"Words in Your Eyes"	—	—	—	—	—	Mystic Line
1979	"Living Alone"	—	—	—	—	—	Living Alone
1979	"You Broke It"	—	—	—	—	—	Living Alone
1980	"Dare to Dream Again"	63	9	—	—	—	—N/a
1981	"Sweet Southern Love"	52	42	—	—	—	—N/a
1982	"Louise"	—	—	—	—	47	Phil Everly
1983	"Who's Gonna Keep Me Warm"	37	—	40	—	—	Phil Everly
1983	"She Means Nothing to Me" (with Cliff Richard)	—	—	—	39	9	Phil Everly
1983	"Sweet Pretender"	—	—	—	—	79	Phil Everly
1992	"On Top of the World" (with René Shuman)	—	—	—	—	—	—N/a
1994	"All I Have to Do Is Dream" (with Cliff Richard)	—	—	—	93	14	—N/a
"—" denotes releases that did not chart

== See also ==
- Don Everly
- The Everly Brothers
- List of songs recorded by the Everly Brothers
