= Poor Jenny (song) =

Single by The Everly Brothers
- A-side: "Take a Message to Mary"
- Released: 1959
- Genre: Rockabilly
- Length: 2:08
- Label: Cadence
- Songwriter(s): Felice Bryant & Boudleaux Bryant

The Everly Brothers singles chronology
"Problems" / "Love of My Life" (1958)	"Take a Message to Mary" / "Poor Jenny" (1959)	"(Till) I Kissed You" / "Oh What a Feeling" (1959)

"Poor Jenny" is a song released in 1959 by The Everly Brothers. The song spent 12 weeks on the Billboard Hot 100 chart, peaking at No. 22, while reaching No. 14 on the United Kingdom's New Musical Express chart.

There are two released versions of the Everly Brothers version of the song. Though there are other differences, the easiest way to distinguish between the two versions is a lyric change in the song's narrative. The US version has the fight starting at ten o'clock; a different take of the song, released as the UK single, has the fight starting at one o'clock.

== Chart performance ==
Chart (1959)	Peak position
US Billboard Hot 100	22
UK - New Musical Express	14

== Cover versions ==
A cover version by The Two Joes was released off of Bell Records in 1959, the same year of the Everly Brothers original version. Their version of the song failed to chart and was their only ever release.

Nick Lowe and Dave Edmunds released a version of the song on their 1980 EP, Nick Lowe & Dave Edmunds Sing The Everly Brothers.
