= (You Got) The Power of Love =

Song

Single by The Everly Brothers
- Released: April 1966
- Songwriters: Delaney Bramlett and Joey Cooper
- Producer: Dick Glasser

The Everly Brothers recorded "(You Got) The Power of Love", written by Delaney Bramlett and Joey Cooper, in Hollywood on February 3, 1966. It was produced by Dick Glasser. Session artists included Glen Campbell, Larry Knechtel, Jim Gordon and Hal Blaine. Released by Warner Brothers as a single in April 1966, this rock and roll tune was a cohesive effort and remains a favorite today. The song featured on the In Our Image album subsequently released by Warner Brothers, one of a trio of albums regarded by Don Everly as the best they recorded for the Warner Brothers label, the other two being Rock N Soul and Beat N Soul.

It was also recorded by Nancy Wilson on a Capitol single that year.
