= The Song We Fell in Love To (song) =

Single by Connie Smith

from the album The Song We Fell in Love To
- B-side: "One Little Reason"
- Released: September 1975
- Recorded: August 1974
- Studio: Columbia Recording Studio
- Genre: Country; country pop
- Length: 2:23
- Label: Columbia
- Songwriters: Ray Baker; Tupper Saussy
- Producer: Ray Baker

Connie Smith singles chronology
"Why Don't You Love Me" (1975)	"The Song We Fell in Love To" (1975)	"(Till) I Kissed You" (1976)

"The Song We Fell in Love To" is a song by American country music singer Connie Smith. It was composed by Ray Baker and Tupper Saussy and released as a single via Columbia Records in 1975. The song became a top 30 hit on the American country music chart in 1976 and was released on an album of the same name.

== Background, content and chart performance ==
After having a series of commercial country hits at RCA Victor in the 1960s, Connie Smith switched to Columbia Records in 1973. Under the production of Ray Baker, she recorded several singles in the mid-1970s, including "The Song We Fell in Love To". The song was composed by Ray Baker and Tupper Saussy. The song was recorded in August 1974 at the Columbia Studio, located in Nashville, Tennessee. With Baker serving as producer, Smith cut an additional 11 tracks during the same session.

"The Song We Fell in Love To" was issued as a single on Columbia Records in September 1975. It was backed on the flip side by "One Little Reason," on a vinyl-issued single. The song spent 11 weeks on the Billboard Hot Country Songs chart and peaked at number 29 in November 1975. It was Smith's fifth solo single to reach a peak position in country top 40. It was later issued on Smith's 1976 album of the same name.

== Track listing ==
7" vinyl single

- "The Song We Fell in Love To" – 2:23
- "One Little Reason" – 2:25

== Charts ==
Chart (1975–76)	Peak position
US Hot Country Songs (Billboard)	29
