= Cowboys Don't Shoot Straight (Like They Used To) =

Single by Tammy Wynette

from the album You Brought Me Back
- B-side: "You Brought Me Back"
- Released: February 1981
- Studio: Moman's Recording Studio
- Genre: Country
- Length: 2:54
- Label: Epic
- Songwriters: Buddy Emmons; Chips Moman
- Producer: Chips Moman

Tammy Wynette singles chronology
| "Starting Over" (1980) | "Cowboys Don't Shoot Straight (Like They Used To)" (1981) | "Crying in the Rain" (1981) |

"Cowboys Don't Shoot Straight (Like They Used To)" is a song written by Buddy Emmons and Chips Moman that was originally recorded by American country artist Tammy Wynette. It was released as a single in 1981, reaching top 40 chart positions in both the United States and Canada. It was the first single off Wynette's 1981 album, You Brought Me Back.

== Background, release and chart performance ==
Tammy Wynette was considered among country music's most popular female artists during the 1960s and 1970s. She had 20 number one Billboard country singles. At the beginning of the 1980s, her chart success began to wane. However, for a time she continued having singles reach the top 20 and the top 40. One of the singles Wynette recorded in the early 1980s was "Cowboys Don't Shoot Straight Like They Used To". It was composed by Chips Moman and Buddy Emmons.

The song was recorded at Moman's Recording Studio in Nashville, Tennessee. It was produced by Chips Moman. It was released as a single by Epic Records in February 1981 backed by the track, "You Brought Me Back". "Cowboys Don't Shoot Straight" peaked at number 21 on the American Billboard Hot Country Songs chart in 1981. It was Wynette's first second charting single to miss the Billboard country top 20. In Canada, it reached number 36 on their RPM Country Songs chart. It was released on Wynette's 1978 studio album, You Brought Me Back.

== Track listing ==
7" vinyl single

- "Cowboys Don't Shoot Straight (Like They Used To)" – 2:54
- "You Brought Me Back" – 4:00

== Charts ==
| Chart (1981) | Peak position |
|---|---|
| US Hot Country Singles (Billboard) | 21 |
| Canada Country Singles (RPM) | 36 |
