= Brownie, Kentucky =

Unincorporated community in Kentucky, United States

- Unincorporated community
- Location within Kentucky Location within the United States
- Coordinates: 37°29′22″N 87°11′29″W
- Country: United States
- State: Kentucky
- County: Muhlenberg
- Elevation: 1,214 ft (370 m)
- Time zone: UTC-6 (Central (CST))
  - Summer (DST): UTC-5 (CST)

Brownie was an unincorporated community located in Muhlenberg County, Kentucky, United States. It eventually became part of Central City.

== Notable people ==
- Don Everly, one half of the rock 'n roll duo, the Everly Brothers.
