= You Brought Me Back =

Studio album by Tammy Wynette
- Released: June 22, 1981
- Recorded: January 1981
- Genre: Country
- Length: 31:04
- Label: Epic
- Producer: Chips Moman

Tammy Wynette chronology
Only Lonely Sometimes (1980)	You Brought Me Back (1981)	Soft Touch (1982)

Singles from You Brought Me Back
- 1. "Cowboys Don't Shoot Straight (Like They Used To)" Released: February 1981; 2. "Crying in the Rain" Released: August 1981

Professional ratings
Review scores
Source	Rating
AllMusic	2/5 stars
The Rolling Stone Album Guide	3/5 stars

You Brought Me Back is a studio album by American country music singer-songwriter Tammy Wynette. It was released on June 22, 1981, by Epic Records.

== Song information ==
"Easy Come, Easy Go" is a Mama Cass Elliot cover from her 1969 album, Bubblegum, Lemonade, and... Something for Mama. Wynette also recorded a completely different song also called "Easy Come, Easy Go" on her 1976 album, 'Til I Can Make It on My Own, which is a Dobie Gray cover from his 1975 album, New Ray of Sunshine.

== Chart performance ==
The album failed to chart on the Billboard Country Albums chart. The album's first single, "Cowboys Don't Shoot Straight (Like They Used To)", peaked at No. 21 on the Billboard Country Singles chart, and the second single, "Crying in the Rain", peaked at No. 18.

== Track listing ==
Side one
No.	Title	Writer(s)	Length
1.	"Cowboys Don't Shoot Straight (Like They Used To)"	Chips Moman, Bobby Emmons	2:58
2.	"Crying in the Rain"	Carole King, Howard Greenfield	3:12
3.	"Bring Back My Baby to Me"	R. Miller	3:26
4.	"You Brought Me Back"	Billy Burnette	4:06
5.	"Goodnight, Cowboy, Goodnight"	Wanda Mallette, Patti Ryan, Dianna Ryan	2:53

Side two
No.	Title	Writer(s)	Length
1.	"Easy Street"	Moman, Emmons	3:10
2.	"I Don't Think I See Me in Your Eyes Anymore"	Moman, Emmons	2:29
3.	"The Best There Is"	Wayland Holyfield, Randy Goodrum	2:40
4.	"Easy Come, Easy Go"	Jack Keller, Diane Hildebrand	3:03
5.	"He's Rolling Over and Over (In Someone Else's Clover)"	Moman, Emmons	3:07

== Personnel ==
Adapted from the album liner notes.

- Chips Moman - producer
- Tammy Wynette - lead vocals

== Chart positions ==
=== Singles ===
Year	Single	Chart	Peak position
1981	"Cowboys Don't Shoot Straight (Like They Used To)"	Country Singles (Billboard)	21
1981	"Crying in the Rain"	Country Singles (Billboard)	18
