= Take a Message to Mary =

Single by the Everly Brothers
- B-side: "Poor Jenny"
- Released: 1959
- Recorded: 1959
- Genre: pop ballad
- Length: 2:24
- Label: Cadence
- Songwriters: Felice Bryant, Boudleaux Bryant

The Everly Brothers singles chronology
"Problems" (1958)	"Take a Message to Mary" (1959)	"(Till) I Kissed You" (1959)

"Take a Message to Mary" is a single released in 1959 by the Everly Brothers. The song spent 13 weeks on the Billboard Hot 100 chart, peaking at No. 16, while reaching No. 8 on Canada's CHUM Hit Parade, and No. 20 on the United Kingdom's New Musical Express chart.

== Background ==
In the lyrics of the song, a man is thrown in jail for committing a crime, and not wanting to experience suffering, he asks a friend of his to deliver a message to his sweetheart, Mary, and tell her that he has gone to see the world, has to cancel their wedding day, and encourages her to find someone new. The song ends with a lament from the imprisoned man that his "cell is cold", implying that because of his crime, he loses what he cherishes the most.

== Chart performance ==
Chart (1959)	Peak position
US Billboard Hot 100	16
Canada - CHUM Hit Parade	8
UK - New Musical Express	20
