= Bessie the Heifer =

"Bessie The Heifer"

Song by Jimmy Dickens
- Released: 1951
- Songwriter(s): Jimmy Dickens, Boudleaux Bryant

"Bessie The Heifer" is an American country-western novelty song written by Jimmy Dickens and Boudleaux Bryant. Performed by Dickens, the song was released by Columbia in 1951 (Columbia 20786). The song was one of Billboard magazine's Country And Western Disk Jockey Picks shortly after it was released. The song has been performed by other musicians such as Wayne Newton and Grant Rogers. Newton sang the song on a 1965 episode of The Lucy Show, "Lucy Discovers Wayne Newton."

The song (and a parody of it called "Melvin the Mollusk") was performed many times at The Adventurers Club in Downtown Disney at Walt Disney World.
