= It's All Over (The Everly Brothers song) =

1965 single by the Everly Brothers

- Cover of the single released in the Netherlands

Single by The Everly Brothers

from the album In Our Image
- B-side: "I Used to Love You"
- Released: December 1965
- Recorded: November 12, 1965
- Studio: RCA Victor, Hollywood
- Genre: Country rock; Pop rock
- Length: 2:16
- Label: Warner Bros.
- Songwriter: Don Everly
- Producer: Dick Glasser

The Everly Brothers singles chronology
| "Love Is Strange" (1965) | "It's All Over" (1965) | "The Dollhouse Is Empty" (1966) |

"It's All Over" is a song by the Everly Brothers, released as a single in December 1965 from their album In Our Image.

== Release and reception ==
"It's All Over" is one of the few Everly Brothers songs to feature Phil Everly on lead vocals, with Don Everly doing the harmony. The song also prominently features a harpsichord played by Don Randi. The single was only released in the US and the Netherlands, with the B-side "I Used to Love You", written by Sonny Curtis. It was scheduled for release in the UK in January 1966, but was never released.

Reviewed in Cash Box, "It's All Over" was described as a "soft dreamyeyed heartbreaker. Husky sad tale of a lost love has tons of tear-jerking ten-appeal". In Record World, it was described as a "slow ballad paced by a harpsichord. Unusual sound will get attention for the change of pace".

However, the song failed to chart in the US or the Netherlands.

== Cliff Richard version ==
"It's All Over"
- Cover of the single released in the Netherlands

Single by Cliff Richard and Bernard Ebbinghouse and His Orchestra
- B-side: "Why Wasn't I Born Rich"
- Released: 10 March 1967
- Recorded: 11 October 1966
- Studio: EMI Studios, London
- Genre: Baroque pop; Country pop
- Length: 2:28
- Label: Columbia
- Songwriter: Don Everly
- Producer: Norrie Paramor

Cliff Richard and Bernard Ebbinghouse and His Orchestra singles chronology
| "In the Country" (1966) | "It's All Over" (1967) | "I'll Come Runnin'" (1967) |

In March 1967, Cliff Richard released a cover of the song as a single, which peaked at number 9 on the UK Singles Chart.

=== Release and reception ===
"It's All Over" was first recorded by Richard in September 1966. However, this version remains unreleased and instead, a re-recording of the song a month later was the version released as a single. Richard's version was arranged by Bernard Ebbinghouse, whose orchestra performs all instrumentation on the track. The B-side, "Why Wasn't I Born Rich", is backed by the Shadows, who wrote the song for the pantomime cast album Cinderella.

Peter Jones for Record Mirror was "just a little disappointed" with "It's All Over", describing it as "very slow, low-pitched, throaty, and sentimental, but somehow Cliff doesn't really get going. However. it's a superbly professional performance". Reviewing for Disc and Music Echo, Penny Valentine described the song as "very drifting stuff saved for me by the intensely well written words by Don Everly".

=== Track listing ===
1. "It's All Over" – 2:28
2. "Why Wasn't I Born Rich" – 2:41

=== Charts ===
| Chart (1967) | Peak position |
|---|---|
| Australia (Kent Music Report) | 65 |
| Ireland (IRMA) | 11 |
| Malaysia (Radio Malaysia) | 2 |
| Netherlands (Dutch Top 40) | 24 |
| New Zealand (Listener) | 15 |
| UK Singles (OCC) | 9 |

== Other versions ==
- In 1967, American doo-wop group The Casinos released a cover of the song as a single, which peaked at number 65 on the Billboard Hot 100.
- In 1976, American country music singer Don Gibson covered the song on his album I'm All Wrapped Up in You.
- In 2013, American duo Dawn McCarthy and Bonnie "Prince" Billy covered the song on their album What the Brothers Sang.
