= How Can I Meet Her? =

Single by The Everly Brothers

from the album The Golden Hits of The Everly Brothers
- A-side: "That's Old Fashioned (That's the Way Love Should Be)"
- Released: April 18, 1962
- Genre: Rock and roll
- Length: 1:48
- Label: Warner Bros. 5273
- Songwriter(s): Gerry Goffin, Jack Keller

The Everly Brothers singles chronology
"Crying in the Rain" (December 22, 1961)	"How Can I Meet Her?" (1962)	"I'm Here to Get My Baby Out of Jail" (September 1962)

"How Can I Meet Her?" is a song written by Gerry Goffin and Jack Keller and performed by The Everly Brothers. In 1962, the track reached No. 12 on the UK Singles Chart and No. 75 on the U.S. pop chart.

It was featured on their 1962 album, The Golden Hits of The Everly Brothers.
