= In Our Image =

Studio album by The Everly Brothers
- Released: April 1966
- Recorded: April 4, 1965 – February 3, 1966
- Length: 28:04
- Label: Warner Bros.
- Producer: Dick Glasser

The Everly Brothers chronology
Beat & Soul (1965)	In Our Image (1966)	Two Yanks in England (1966)

Professional ratings
Review scores
Source	Rating
Allmusic	3/5 stars
The Encyclopedia of Popular Music	3/5 stars
Record Mirror	4/5 stars

In Our Image is an album by The Everly Brothers, originally released in 1966.

Several of the songs had appeared on singles in 1965, where their biggest success came in the United Kingdom off the back of "The Price Of Love" (present on this album) and "Love Is Strange" (from Beat & Soul), the former of which ascended to No. 2 on the UK Charts, but only No. 104 in America.

The album also includes "It Only Costs A Dime", a self-written piece that was the B-side to "The Price of Love".

In December of that year, the final single "It's All Over" was released, featuring harpsichord and vocals. In a break from the usual routine, Phil sang the principal vocal line with Don singing the harmony line a third lower. The song was later covered by Cliff Richard.

Revisiting their classic style of singing, they recorded the Sonny Curtis-written "I Used To Love You". Curtis, former member of The Crickets, had previously written another Everly Brothers hit single, "Walk Right Back".

For the first 45 release of 1966, they visited the songwriting partnership of Barry Mann and Cynthia Weil, with a rendition of "Glitter And Gold". This arrangement, featuring fuzz guitar and harpsichord, was backed with another Brill Building number, the Howard Greenfield and Jack Keller-written "Lovey Kravezit".

Before the previous single's success could be measured, "(You Got) The Power of Love" (written by Delaney Bramlett and Joey Cooper) was released, featuring Motown influences and backed with "Leave My Girl Alone".

The album also includes "The Doll House Is Empty" (later released as Warner Brothers single 5689 in February 1966), "(Why Am I) Chained To A Memory" (by Edward A. Snyder and Richard Ahlert) and "June Is As Cold As December" by Marge Barton.

== Track listing ==
=== Side one ===
1. "Leave My Girl Alone" (Bernie Baum, Bill Giant, Florence Kaye, Kenny Lynch) – 2:22
2. "(Why Am I) Chained to a Memory" (Eddie Snyder, Richard Ahlert) – 2:07
3. "I'll Never Get Over You" (Phil Everly, Don Everly) – 2:09
4. "The Doll House is Empty" (Howard Greenfield, Jack Keller) – 2:00
5. "Glitter and Gold" (Barry Mann, Cynthia Weil) – 2:40
6. "(You Got) The Power of Love" (Delaney Bramlett, Joey Cooper) – 2:37

=== Side two ===
1. "The Price of Love" (Phil Everly, Don Everly) – 2:07
2. "It's All Over" (Don Everly) – 2:19
3. "I Used to Love You" (Sonny Curtis) – 2:15
4. "Lovey Kravezit" (Inspired by the Columbia Motion Picture The Silencers) (Howard Greenfield, Jack Keller) – 2:37
5. "June is as Cold as December" (Marge Barton) – 2:52
6. "It Only Costs a Dime" (Phil Everly, Don Everly) – 1:57
