= That's Old Fashioned (That's the Way Love Should Be) =

Single by The Everly Brothers
- B-side: "How Can I Meet Her?"
- Released: 1962
- Genre: Folk rock
- Length: 2:23
- Label: Warner Bros. Records
- Songwriter(s): Bill Giant, Bernie Baum & Florence Kaye

The Everly Brothers singles chronology
"Crying in the Rain" (1962)	"That's Old Fashioned (That's the Way Love Should Be)" (1962)	"I'm Here to Get My Baby Out of Jail" (1962)

"That's Old Fashioned (That's the Way Love Should Be)" is a song released in 1962 by The Everly Brothers. The song spent 11 weeks on the Billboard Hot 100 chart, peaking at No. 9, while reaching No. 4 on Billboard's Easy Listening chart, No. 6 in the Philippines, and No. 18 on Canada's CHUM Hit Parade. This song is their last top 10 hit in the United States.

== Chart performance ==
Chart (1962)	Peak position
US Billboard Hot 100	9
US Billboard Easy Listening	4
Philippines	6
Canada - CHUM Hit Parade	18
