= Born Yesterday (song) =

Single by The Everly Brothers

from the album Born Yesterday
- B-side: "Don't Say Goodnight"
- Released: January 1986
- Genre: Pop rock
- Length: 4:00
- Label: Mercury; 884428
- Songwriter(s): Don Everly
- Producer(s): Dave Edmunds

The Everly Brothers singles chronology
"The First in Line" (1984)	"Born Yesterday" (1986)	"I Know Love" (1986)

"Born Yesterday" is a song written by Don Everly and performed by The Everly Brothers. In 1986, the track reached No. 17 on the U.S. adult contemporary chart and the U.S. country chart.

It was featured on their 1986 album, Born Yesterday.

The song was nominated for the Grammy Award for Best Country Performance by a Duo or Group with Vocal and Video of the Year at the 22nd Academy of Country Music Awards in 1987.
