= Bowling Green (song) =

1967 single

Single by The Everly Brothers

from the album The Everly Brothers Sing
- B-side: "I Don't Want to Love You"
- Released: 1967
- Recorded: 1967
- Length: 2:40
- Label: Warner Bros.
- Songwriters: Terry Slater and Jacqueline Ertel
- Producer: Dick Glasser

The Everly Brothers singles chronology
"The Devil's Child" (1967)	"Bowling Green" (1967)	"Mary Jane" (1967)

"Bowling Green" is a 1967 single by The Everly Brothers and was written by Terry Slater and Jacqueline Ertel, Phil Everly's wife at the time; Slater was the duo's bass player.

== Background ==
The song is about Bowling Green, Kentucky, which is about an hour's drive from Central City, Ky., where Don Everly was born. The song features a wind ensemble and Jim Gordon on drums. The Everly Brothers imitate the sounds of guitars by singing "ching" repeatedly.

This is not the traditional song "I Wish I Was In Bowling Green", also known as "Bowling Green", recorded by Cousin Emmy, the Weavers, the Kossoy Sisters and others.

== Chart performance ==
The song peaked at #40 on the Billboard Hot 100 on July 8, 1967. It was the last time the Everly Brothers cracked the Hot 100 until 1984. Outside the US, "Bowling Green" reached No. 1 in Toronto, Canada for the week of June 17, 1967.
