= On the Wings of a Nightingale =

Single by The Everly Brothers

from the album EB 84
- B-side: "Asleep"
- Released: August 1984
- Genre: Pop rock, country rock
- Length: 2:34
- Label: Mercury
- Songwriter: Paul McCartney
- Producer: Dave Edmunds

The Everly Brothers singles chronology
"Not Fade Away" (1973)	"On the Wings of a Nightingale" (1984)	"The First in Line" (1985)

"On the Wings of a Nightingale" is a song written by Paul McCartney and recorded by the Everly Brothers in 1984 for their album EB 84, which Dave Edmunds produced.

== Background ==
Paul McCartney had written the song specifically for the Everly Brothers and played guitar on the recording. The track was included as the first track on the duo's 1984 album EB 84. "On the Wings of a Nightingale" became their most popular song since 1970 and reached number 50 on the Billboard Hot 100.

== Music video ==
The video made to accompany the song shows the brothers rescuing a classic car (specifically, a 1957 Chevrolet Bel Air convertible) from a junk yard, restoring it (in a series of shots that compress an unknown number of weeks, or months, into 35 seconds of video time) to drivable condition, then finally taking it out for a spin.

== Charts ==
Chart (1984–85)	Peak position
Belgium (Ultratop)	12
Canadian RPM Adult Contemporary Tracks	10
Canadian RPM Country Tracks	39
Germany	50
Netherlands	3
New Zealand	48
South African Singles Chart	6
U.S. Billboard Hot 100	50
U.S. Billboard Adult Contemporary	9
U.S. Billboard Hot Country Singles	49
UK Singles Chart	41

== Cover versions ==
The Spongetones recorded a version for their 2000 Odd Fellows album. Apple Jam also recorded three versions for their 2012 On the Wings of a Nightingale EP.

McCartney's own version still exists, strictly as a demonstration recording; it appears on the Artifacts III album, released in 1995. The accompanying booklet states Summer 1984 as the date of the recording.
