= Dare to Dream Again =

Single by Phil Everly
- B-side: "Lonely Days, Lonely Nights"
- Released: 1980
- Genre: Country pop
- Length: 2:48
- Label: Curb Records
- Songwriter: Phil Everly
- Producers: Phil Everly & Joey Paige

Phil Everly singles chronology
"Living Alone" (1979)	"Dare to Dream Again" (1980)	"Sweet Southern Love" (1981)

"Dare to Dream Again" is a song written and sung by Phil Everly, which he released as a single in 1980. The song spent 16 weeks on Billboard's Adult Contemporary chart, peaking at No. 9, while reaching No. 63 on the Billboard Hot Country Singles chart.

The album version of "Dare to Dream Again" features a solo vocal by Phil Everly. However, the single release features Phil singing a harmony vocal with himself in an effort to recreate the dual harmonies of The Everly Brothers.

== Chart performance ==
Chart (1981)	Peak position
US Billboard Adult Contemporary	9
US Billboard Hot Country Singles	63
US Cash Box Top 100 Country	66
