= Problems (The Everly Brothers song) =

Single by The Everly Brothers
- B-side: "Love of My Life"
- Released: October 27, 1958
- Recorded: October 13, 1958
- Genre: Rock and roll; pop
- Length: 1:54
- Label: Cadence
- Songwriters: Felice Bryant & Boudleaux Bryant

The Everly Brothers singles chronology
"Bird Dog" (1958)	"Problems" (1958)	"Take a Message to Mary" (1959)

"Problems" is a song released in 1958 by The Everly Brothers. The song spent 15 weeks on the Billboard Hot 100 chart, peaking at No. 2, "Problems" was kept out of No.1 spot by To Know Him Is to Love Him by The Teddy Bears.

== Outside the US ==
Outside the US, "Problems" reached No. 5 on Canada's CHUM Hit Parade, No. 5 in the Netherlands, and No. 6 on the UK's New Musical Express chart.

== Chart performance ==
Chart (1958)	Peak position
Canada (CHUM Hit Parade)	5
Flanders	16
Netherlands	5
Italy (Musica e Dischi)	17
UK New Musical Express	6
US Billboard Hot 100	2
US Billboard Hot C&W Sides	17
