= Don Everly =

American singer-songwriter (1937–2021)

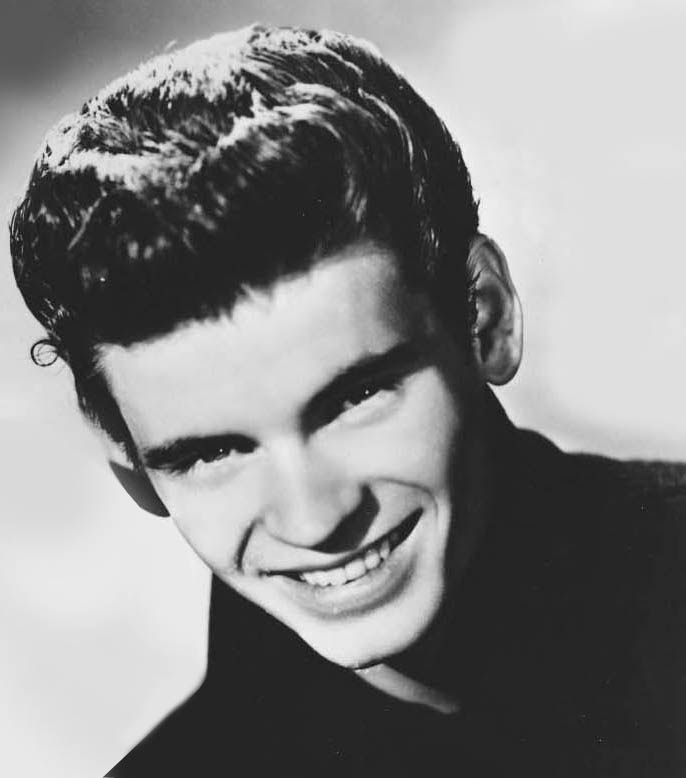
- Everly In 1958

Background information
- Born: Isaac Donald Everly; February 1, 1937; Brownie, Kentucky, U.S.
- Died: August 21, 2021 (aged 84) Nashville, Tennessee, U.S.
- Genres: Country; pop; rock
- Occupation: Musician
- Instruments: Guitar; vocals
- Years active: 1951–2018
- Formerly of: The Everly Brothers

Isaac Donald Everly (February 1, 1937 – August 21, 2021) was an American musician. Everly was one-half of the singing duo The Everly Brothers alongside his younger brother Phil.

== Early life ==
The Everly Brothers' childhood home in Shenandoah, Iowa

Everly was born in Brownie, Kentucky on February 1, 1937, to Isaac Milford "Ike" Everly Jr. (1908–1975), a guitar player, and Margaret Embry Everly (1919–2021). He was of German, English and Cherokee descent.

The Everly family moved to Knoxville, Tennessee, in 1953, where the brothers attended West High School. In 1955, the family moved to Madison, Tennessee, while the brothers moved to Nashville. Everly graduated from high school in 1955.

== Career ==
=== The Everly Brothers ===
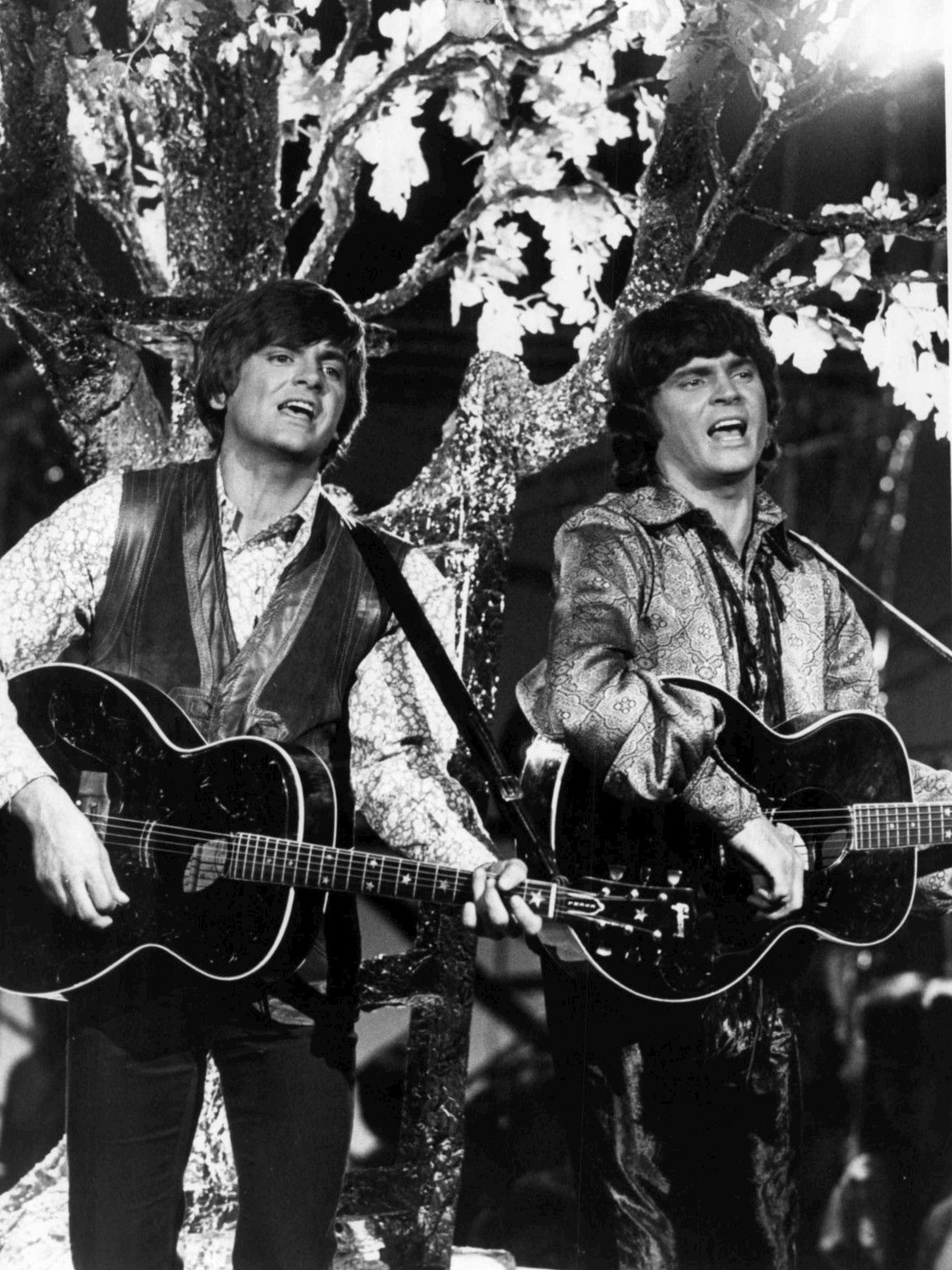
The Everly Brothers performing in 1970

The Everly Brothers' career started in 1951. They signed to Cadence Records In 1957. Their first hit was "Bye Bye Love", a song that had been rejected by 30 other acts.

"Bye Bye Love" went to no. 2 on the pop charts, behind Elvis Presley's "(Let Me Be Your) Teddy Bear", and No. 1 on the country and No. 5 on the R&B charts. The song, by Felice and Boudleaux Bryant, became the Everly Brothers' first million-seller.

The Everly Brothers are remembered for other major hits such as "Cathy's Clown" and "All I Have To Do Is Dream".

After the duo split following conflicts between the two brothers, Phil and Don pursued solo careers from 1973 to 1983. The brothers reunited at the Royal Albert Hall in London on September 23, 1983, ending their ten-year-long hiatus. The event was initiated by Phil and Don alongside Terry Slater, with Wingfield as musical director. This concert was recorded for a live LP and video broadcast on cable television in mid-January 1984. The brothers returned to the studio as a duo for the first time in over a decade, recording the album EB 84, produced by Dave Edmunds.

The Everly Brothers were inducted into the Rock and Roll Hall of Fame in 1986. They were the first duo and non-solo act to have been inducted. That same year, they received a star on the Hollywood Walk of Fame.

Their final charting single was 1986's "Born Yesterday". A 1981 live BBC recording of "All I Have to Do Is Dream", which featured Cliff Richard and Phil sharing vocals, was a UK Top 20 hit in 1994.

Paul McCartney spoke of the importance of the Everly Brothers to the Beatles:

They were one of the major influences on the Beatles. When John and I first started to write songs, I was Phil and he was Don.

=== Solo work ===
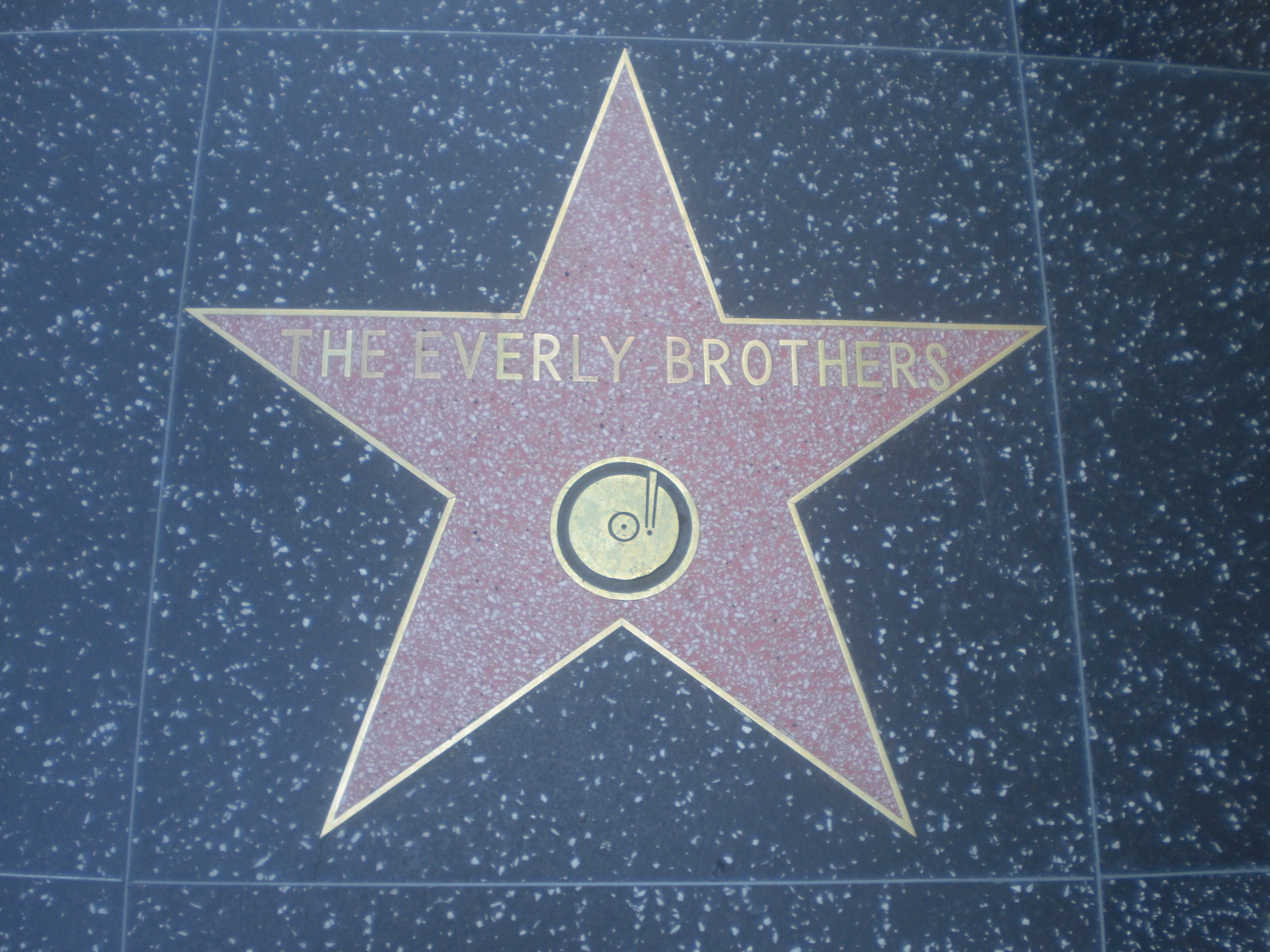
The Everly Brothers Hollywood Walk of Fame star

Everly found some success on the US country charts in the mid- to late-1970s, in Nashville with his band, Dead Cowboys, and playing with Albert Lee.

Everly also performed solo at an annual country music festival in London in mid-1976. His appearance was well received, and he was given "thunderous applause", even though critics noted that the performance was uneven. Everly recorded "Everytime You Leave" with Emmylou Harris on her 1979 album Blue Kentucky Girl.

Everly attended the Annual Music Masters as the Rock and Roll Hall of Fame paid homage to the Everly Brothers on October 25, 2014. Everly took the State Theater stage and performed the Everlys' classic hit "Bye Bye Love".

Everly stopped performing in 2018. His final performance was a guest appearance with Paul Simon on Simon's 2018 farewell tour in Nashville. Everly and Simon performed “Bye Bye Love”, with Simon on Phil Everly's original tenor harmony.

== Personal life ==
Everly was married four times: first to Mary Sue Ingraham from 1957 to 1961, then actress Venetia Stevenson from 1962 to 1970, Karen Prettyman from 1975 to 1983 and finally Adela Garza from 1997 until his death. Everly had five children, including son Edan, who is also a musician, and daughter Erin, a model at one time married to Axl Rose.

Everly publicly endorsed Hillary Clinton for the 2016 presidential election in January of that year. This marked the first time he had ever publicly supported a political candidate. Everly stated that after his brother's death, he felt free to express his views more openly, noting that the brothers' opposing views had made it impossible for them to lend active support to political candidates.

== Death ==
Everly died in Nashville on August 21, 2021, aged 84, from undisclosed causes. His mother died four months later, in December 2021, aged 102. His brother Phil had died in 2014.

== Discography ==
=== Solo ===
==== Albums ====
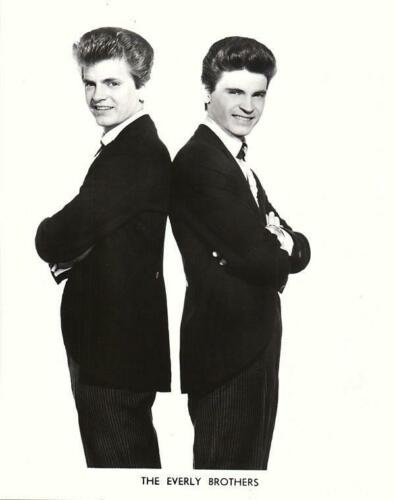
The Everly Brothers In 1965

Title	Details
Don Everly	Release date: January 1971; Label: Ode Records
Sunset Towers	Release date: August 1974; Label: Ode Records
Brother Jukebox	Release date: March 1977; Label: Hickory Records

==== Singles ====
Year	Single	Peak chart positions		Album
Year	Single	US Country	US	Album
1970	"Tumblin' Tumbleweeds"	—	—	Don Everly
1974	"Warmin' Up the Band"	—	110	Sunset Towers
1976	"Yesterday Just Passed My Way Again"	50	—	Brother Jukebox
1977	"Love at Last Sight"	—	—	Brother Jukebox
1977	"Since You Broke My Heart"	84	—	Brother Jukebox
1977	"Brother Jukebox"	96	—	Brother Jukebox
1981	"Let's Put Our Hearts Together"	—	—	—N/a
"—" denotes releases that did not chart

== See also ==
- Phil Everly
- The Everly Brothers
- List of songs recorded by the Everly Brothers
