= Felice and Boudleaux Bryant =

American husband-and-wife music duo

In 1979, they released their own album called A Touch of Bryant.

Felice Bryant (August 7, 1925 – April 22, 2003) and Diadorius Boudleaux Bryant (/ˈbuːdəloʊ/; February 13, 1920 – June 25, 1987) were an American wife-and-husband country music and pop songwriting duo. They are best known for songs such as "Rocky Top", "We Could" (credited solely to Felice), "Love Hurts" (credited solely to Boudleaux), and numerous hits by the Everly Brothers, including "All I Have to Do Is Dream" and "Bird Dog" (credited solely to Boudleaux), "Bye Bye Love", and "Wake Up Little Susie".

== Beginnings ==
Boudleaux Bryant was born in Shellman, Georgia, in 1920 and attended local schools as a child. He trained as a classical violinist. Although he performed with the Atlanta Philharmonic Orchestra during its 1937–38 season, he had more interest in country fiddling. Bryant joined Hank Penny and his Radio Cowboys, an Atlanta-based western music band.

Felice Bryant was born Matilda Genevieve Scaduto in Milwaukee, Wisconsin, in 1925 to an ethnic Italian family, and had written lyrics set to traditional Italian tunes. During World War II, she sang and directed shows at the local USO.

On August 31, 1945, Boudleaux met Felice when he was performing at the Schroeder Hotel, in Milwaukee, her home town, where she was working as an elevator operator. They married five days after meeting. She said that she "recognized" him immediately; she had seen his face in a dream when she was eight years old, and had "looked for him forever". "All I Have to Do Is Dream" was biographical for Felice.

== Songwriting career ==
During the first years of their marriage, the Bryants struggled financially, living in a mobile home, where they wrote more than 80 songs. They tried to sell their compositions to a number of country music artists, but were either ignored or rejected until Little Jimmy Dickens recorded their song "Country Boy." It went to number seven on the country chart in 1948 and opened the door to a working relationship with Fred Rose at Acuff-Rose Music in Nashville, Tennessee.

In 1950, the Bryants moved to Nashville to work full-time at songwriting. Some of their compositions from the early 1950s included the swinging "Sugar Beet" (recorded by Moon Mullican) and the bluesy "Midnight" (recorded by Red Foley).

The Bryants wrote more songs for Dickens, as well as for country artist Carl Smith. At the same time, they released four 45 rpm singles of their own to modest success.

Beginning in 1957, the Bryants came to national prominence in both country and pop music when they wrote a string of very successful songs for the Everly Brothers and hits for other singers, such as Roy Orbison and Buddy Holly. Their compositions were recorded by many artists from a variety of musical genres, including Lynn Anderson, Tony Bennett, Frankie Laine, Sonny James, Eddy Arnold, Bob Moore, Charley Pride, Nazareth, Jim Reeves, The Beatles, Leo Sayer, Jerry Lee Lewis, Simon & Garfunkel, Sarah Vaughan, the Grateful Dead, Elvis Costello, Count Basie, Dean Martin, Ray Charles, Gram Parsons, Joan Jett, and Bob Dylan. (Dylan's Self Portrait album has a song by Boudleaux and another he co-wrote with Felice.)

The Bryants wrote hits for many artists.

In 1962, the Bryants wrote "Too Many Chicks", a song that became a hit for Leona Douglas, the first African-American woman to record as a country music singer.

The Bryants eventually moved to a house not far from Nashville on Old Hickory Lake in Hendersonville, Tennessee, near friends Roy Orbison and Johnny Cash. In 1978, they moved to Gatlinburg, Tennessee. They had often stayed at The Gatlinburg Inn, where they wrote numerous songs, including "Rocky Top". They purchased the Rocky Top Village Inn in the town next to the Great Smoky Mountains National Park. In 1979, they released their own album called A Touch of Bryant. "Rocky Top", written in 1967, was adopted as a state song by Tennessee in 1982, and as the unofficial fight song for the University of Tennessee sports teams. The Bryants wrote more than 6,000 songs, some 1,500 of which were recorded.

During their career, the Bryants earned 59 BMI country, pop, and rhythm and blues music awards. In 1972, they were inducted into the Nashville Songwriters Hall of Fame, in 1986 into the Songwriters Hall of Fame, in 1991 into both the Country Music Hall of Fame and the Rockabilly Hall of Fame, and in 2025 into the Volunteer State Music Hall of Fame.

Boudleaux Bryant is the third-most successful songwriter of the 1950s on the UK Singles Chart, and Felice Bryant is the 21st.

Their works are present in the House of Bryant, which is located in Gatlinburg. From September 2019 to August 2020, their artifacts were on exhibit at the Country Music Hall of Fame in Nashville.

== Deaths ==
Boudleaux Bryant died of cancer in 1987. Felice Bryant remained a songwriter. In 1991, the Nashville Arts Foundation honored her with its Living Legend Award. She, too, died of cancer in 2003. They are both interred in Woodlawn Memorial Park in Nashville.

== Selected list of songs ==
=== Little Jimmy Dickens ===
- "Country Boy" (1948)
- "Bessie the Heifer"
- "We Could" (credited solely to Felice)

=== Everly Brothers ===
- "Bye Bye, Love"
- "Wake Up, Little Susie"
- "All I Have to Do Is Dream" (credited solely to Boudleaux)
- "Donna Donna"
- "Brand New Heartache"
- "Problems"
- "Poor Jenny"
- "Radio & TV"
- "Oh True Love"
- "Take a Message to Mary"
- "Bird Dog" (credited solely to Boudleaux)
- "Like Strangers" (credited solely to Boudleaux)
- "Always It's You"
- "Love of My Life"
- "Love Is All I Need"
- "Lonely Island"
- "Just in Case"
- "Devoted to You" (credited solely to Boudleaux)
- "You Thrill Me"
- "You're the One I Love"
- "Some Sweet Day"
- "Sleepless Nights"
- "Nashville Blues"
- "Love Hurts" (credited solely to Boudleaux)

"Wake Up, Little Susie" and "All I Have to Do Is Dream" scored high on Billboard's "Hot 100" pop, country and western, and rhythm and blues lists. Both charted at number one in all three categories, the latter in all three at the same time.

=== Buddy Holly ===
- "Raining in My Heart"

=== Compton Brothers ===
- "Bird Dog"
- "Love Hurts"

=== Gram Parsons with Emmylou Harris ===
- "Love Hurts"
- "Sleepless Nights"
- "Brand New Heartache"

=== Emmylou Harris ===
- "Sleepless Nights"
- "Like Strangers"
- "Love Hurts"
- “(Lost His Love) On Our Last Date”

=== Ricky Van Shelton ===
- "Hole in My Pocket"

=== Johnny O'Keefe ===
- "She Wears My Ring" (English lyrics)

=== Other artists ===
- "Rocky Top" – The Osborne Brothers, Lynn Anderson, and The Nitty Gritty Dirt Band
- "Mexico" – Bob Moore and His Orchestra (credited solely to Boudleaux)
- "Last Date" – Boudleaux wrote the lyrics to the vocal version of the Floyd Cramer instrumental, recorded in 1960 by Skeeter Davis
- "Bye Bye, Love" – Ray Price (1957), Roy Orbison (1961), Ray Charles (1962)
- "Come Live with Me" – Roy Clark
- "Raining in My Heart" – Robert Wyatt
- "She Wears My Ring" – Jimmy Sweeney (1960), Roy Orbison (1962), Johnny O'Keefe (1964), Solomon King (1967), Ray Price (1968), Elvis Presley (1974)
- "Have a Good Time" – Sue Thompson
- "Love Hurts" – Roy Orbison, Nazareth, and a top five hit for Jim Capaldi in the UK.
- "Sugar Beet" – Moon Mullican
- "Wedding of the Bugs" – Moon Mullican
- "Blue Boy" – Jim Reeves
- "Bella Belinda" – Donn Reynolds
- "I'm Gonna Slip You Offa My Mind" – Tommy Zang
- "Midnight" – Red Foley
- "Some Sweet Day" – Fairport Convention
- "Take a Message to Mary" – Bob Dylan
- "Rocky Top" – Dillard & Clark
- "Devoted to You" – The Beach Boys (credited solely to Boudleaux)
- "You're the Reason God Made Oklahoma" – David Frizzell and Shelly West
- "Nightmare" – Jack Turner

Various songs of theirs, especially "All I Have to Do Is Dream", "Bye Bye, Love", "Love Hurts", and "Wake Up, Little Susie", have been covered by numerous other artists over the years. "Rocky Top" is played by the Pride of the Southland Band at University of Tennessee sporting events.
