= Crying in the Rain =

1962 single by the Everly Brothers

Single by the Everly Brothers
- B-side: "I'm Not Angry"
- Released: December 1961
- Length: 1:59
- Label: Warner Bros.
- Composer: Carole King
- Lyricist: Howard Greenfield

The Everly Brothers singles chronology
"Muskrat" (1961)	"Crying in the Rain" (1961)	"That's Old Fashioned"/"How Can I Meet Her?" (1962)

"Crying in the Rain" is a song by Howard Greenfield with music by Carole King, originally recorded by American duo the Everly Brothers. Their version was released as a single on December 22, 1961, peaking at number six on the US Billboard Hot 100 in February 1962.

The song was a collaboration between Greenfield and King, both of whom worked for music publisher Aldon Music at the time. On a whim, two Aldon songwriting partnerships decided to switch partners for a day; King's regular lyricist and then-husband Gerry Goffin partnered with Greenfield's frequent collaborator Jack Keller, leaving King and Greenfield to pair up. This was the only recorded composition credited to King and Greenfield as a duo, although the trio of Goffin, Greenfield and King had previously collaborated as composers of the minor 1961 hit (US #95) "Play It Again" by Tina Robin, and would also collectively compose the 1968 single "Golden Days" by Sally Field. (Goffin and Keller's collaboration, "Let's Turkey Trot," would become a hit in 1963 for Little Eva.)

== Track listing ==
Side A
No.	Title	Writer(s)	Length
1.	"Crying in the Rain"	Howard Greenfield; Carole King	1:59

Side B
No.	Title	Writer(s)	Length
2.	"I'm Not Angry"	Jimmy Howard (pseudonym of the Everly Brothers)	1:58

== Charts ==
Chart performance for "Crying in the Rain"
Chart (1962–1966)	Peak position
Australia	7
Belgium (Ultratop 50 Wallonia)	10
Netherlands (Single Top 100)	9
New Zealand (Lever Hit Parade)	8
Norway (VG-lista)	8
UK Singles (Official Charts)	6
US Billboard Hot 100	6

== Tammy Wynette version ==
"Crying in the Rain"

Single by Tammy Wynette

from the album You Brought Me Back
- B-side: "Bring My Baby Back to Me"
- Released: August 1981
- Recorded: January 1981
- Studio: Moman's Recording Studio, Las Vegas
- Genre: Country
- Length: 3:12
- Label: Epic
- Composer: Carole King
- Lyricist: Howard Greenfield
- Producer: Chips Moman

Tammy Wynette singles chronology
"Cowboys Don't Shoot Straight (Like They Used To)" (1981)	"Crying in the Rain" (1981)	"Another Chance" (1982)

In 1981, "Crying in the Rain" was covered by American country artist Tammy Wynette Wynette's version was produced by Chips Moman at the Moman Recording Studio in Las Vegas, alongside other tracks that would appear on the album You Brought Me Back.

Released as a single in July 1981, the song reached number 18 on the Billboard Hot Country Singles chart that year, becoming Wynette's third top 20 country hit of the decade. "Crying in the Rain" also peaked at number 11 on the Canadian RPM country chart.

=== Track listing ===
- 7-inch single

A. "Crying in the Rain" – 3:12
B. "Bring My Baby Back to Me" – 3:25

=== Charts ===
Chart performance for "Crying in the Rain"
Chart (1981)	Peak position
Canada Country Singles (RPM)	11
US Hot Country Songs (Billboard)	18

== A-ha version ==
"Crying in the Rain"

Single by A-ha

from the album East of the Sun, West of the Moon
- B-side: "(Seemingly) Nonstop July"
- Released: October 1, 1990
- Length: 4:25
- Label: Warner Bros.
- Composer: Carole King
- Lyricist: Howard Greenfield
- Producer: Christopher Neil

A-ha singles chronology
"There's Never a Forever Thing" (1989)	"Crying in the Rain" (1990)	"I Call Your Name" (1990)

Music video
- "Crying in the Rain" on YouTube

Norwegian synth-pop band A-ha released a cover version of the song as the first single from their fourth studio album, East of the Sun, West of the Moon, in 1990. Following its success, A-ha became closer to the Everly Brothers, who had originally recorded the song. The band members were presented a set of guitars by the Everly Brothers that A-ha continues to use.

=== Commercial performance ===
"Crying in the Rain" was A-ha's last single to reach the top 40 on a Billboard chart in the United States to date, peaking at number 26 on the Hot Adult Contemporary Tracks chart during the week ending April 6, 1991. It was more popular in other countries, topping the charts in the band's native Norway, and peaking at number 13 in the UK Singles Chart.

=== Music video ===
The video was directed by Steve Barron. The theme of the video is a robbery gone wrong. It is actually the second version of this video. The first version did not feature any of the scenes of Morten Harket singing alone. The video was filmed entirely with a specific technique of mobile cameras, and it was filmed in Big Timber, Montana. Academy Award-nominated actor John Hawkes had a small role as a robber in the music video.

=== Track listings ===
- UK CD single
1. "Crying in the Rain" (LP version) – 4:25
2. "(Seemingly) Nonstop July" – 2:55
3. "Cry Wolf" (LP version) – 4:05
- UK 7-inch single

A. "Crying in the Rain" (LP version) – 4:25
B. "(Seemingly) Nonstop July" – 2:55

- UK 12-inch single

A. "Crying in the Rain" (LP version) – 4:25
B1. "(Seemingly) Nonstop July" – 2:55
B2. "Cry Wolf" (LP version) – 4:05

=== Charts ===
==== Weekly charts ====
Weekly chart performance for "Crying in the Rain"
Chart (1990–1991)	Peak position
Australia (ARIA)	131
Austria (Ö3 Austria Top 40)	17
Belgium (Ultratop 50 Flanders)	12
Canada Top Singles (RPM)	34
Europe (Eurochart Hot 100 Singles)	9
Finland (Suomen virallinen lista)	14
France (SNEP)	11
Germany (GfK)	6
Iceland (Íslenski Listinn Topp 10)	1
Ireland (IRMA)	8
Italy (Musica e dischi)	9
Luxembourg (Radio Luxembourg)	7
Netherlands (Dutch Top 40)	11
Netherlands (Single Top 100)	10
Norway (VG-lista)	1
Quebec (ADISQ)	3
Switzerland (Schweizer Hitparade)	21
UK Singles (Official Charts)	13
UK Airplay (Music Week)	24
US Adult Contemporary (Billboard)	26

==== Year-end charts ====
Year-end chart performance for "Crying in the Rain"
Chart (1990)	Position
Germany (Media Control)	86
Netherlands (Single Top 100)	92

== Other cover versions ==
"Crying in the Rain" has been covered by many other artists. In 1969, The Sweet Inspirations recorded a rendition which reached number 38 on the US R&B chart. It was their second Everly Brothers cover hit, having charted two years earlier with "Let It Be Me."

In 1972, Penny DeHaven in duet with Del Reeves released a Country version on a single only (number 54 on the Billboard country chart).

The Partridge Family performed the song on the fourth season of their weekly show in 1974, though the track never ended up on any of their albums.

Nick Lowe and Dave Edmunds released a version of the song on their 1980 EP, Nick Lowe & Dave Edmunds Sing The Everly Brothers.

Carole King recorded her own version on her 1983 album Speeding Time. It was also released as a single.

In 1994, Art Garfunkel had a Canadian Pop and AC hit with the song.
