= (Till) I Kissed You =

1959 song written by Don Everly and recorded by the Everly Brothers

Single by the Everly Brothers
- B-side: "Oh, What a Feeling"
- Released: 1959
- Recorded: 1959
- Studio: RCA Studios (Nashville, Tennessee)
- Genre: Pop
- Length: 2:23
- Label: Cadence 60663
- Songwriter: Don Everly

The Everly Brothers singles chronology
"Take a Message to Mary" (1959)	"(Till) I Kissed You" (1959)	"Let It Be Me" (1959)

"(Till) I Kissed You"

Single by Connie Smith

from the album The Song We Fell in Love To
- B-side: "Ridin' on a Rainbow"
- Released: January 1976
- Genre: Country
- Label: Columbia
- Songwriter: Don Everly
- Producer: Ray Baker

Connie Smith singles chronology
"The Song We Fell in Love To" (1975)	"(Till) I Kissed You" (1976)	"So Sad (To Watch Good Love Go Bad)" (1976)

"(Till) I Kissed You" is a song written by Don Everly and recorded by the Everly Brothers. It was released as a single in 1959 and peaked at No. 4 on the Billboard Hot 100. Chet Atkins played guitar on this record and Jerry Allison played drums.

== Connie Smith version ==
"(Till) I Kissed You" was covered by American country music artist Connie Smith on her 1976 album The Song We Fell in Love To. Released in January 1976, it was the album's second single. Smith's version peaked at No. 10 on the Billboard Hot Country Singles chart. It also reached No. 1 on the RPM Country Tracks chart in Canada.

== Reggae version ==
Several reggae artists have covered the song. In 1975 Jimmy London topped the charts in Jamaica with his version.

== Chart performance ==
=== The Everly Brothers ===
Chart (1959)	Peak position
U.S. Billboard Hot 100	4
U.S. Billboard Hot C&W Sides	8
U.S. Billboard Hot R&B Sides	22
U. S. Cashbox Top 100	5
U. S. Cashbox Country Singles	7
U. S. Cashbox R&B Singles	14
Australian ARIA Chart	2
Canadian RPM Top Singles	3
UK Singles Chart	2

=== Connie Smith ===
Chart (1976)	Peak position
U.S. Billboard Hot Country Singles	10
Canadian RPM Country Tracks	1
