= The Everly Brothers =

American musical duo

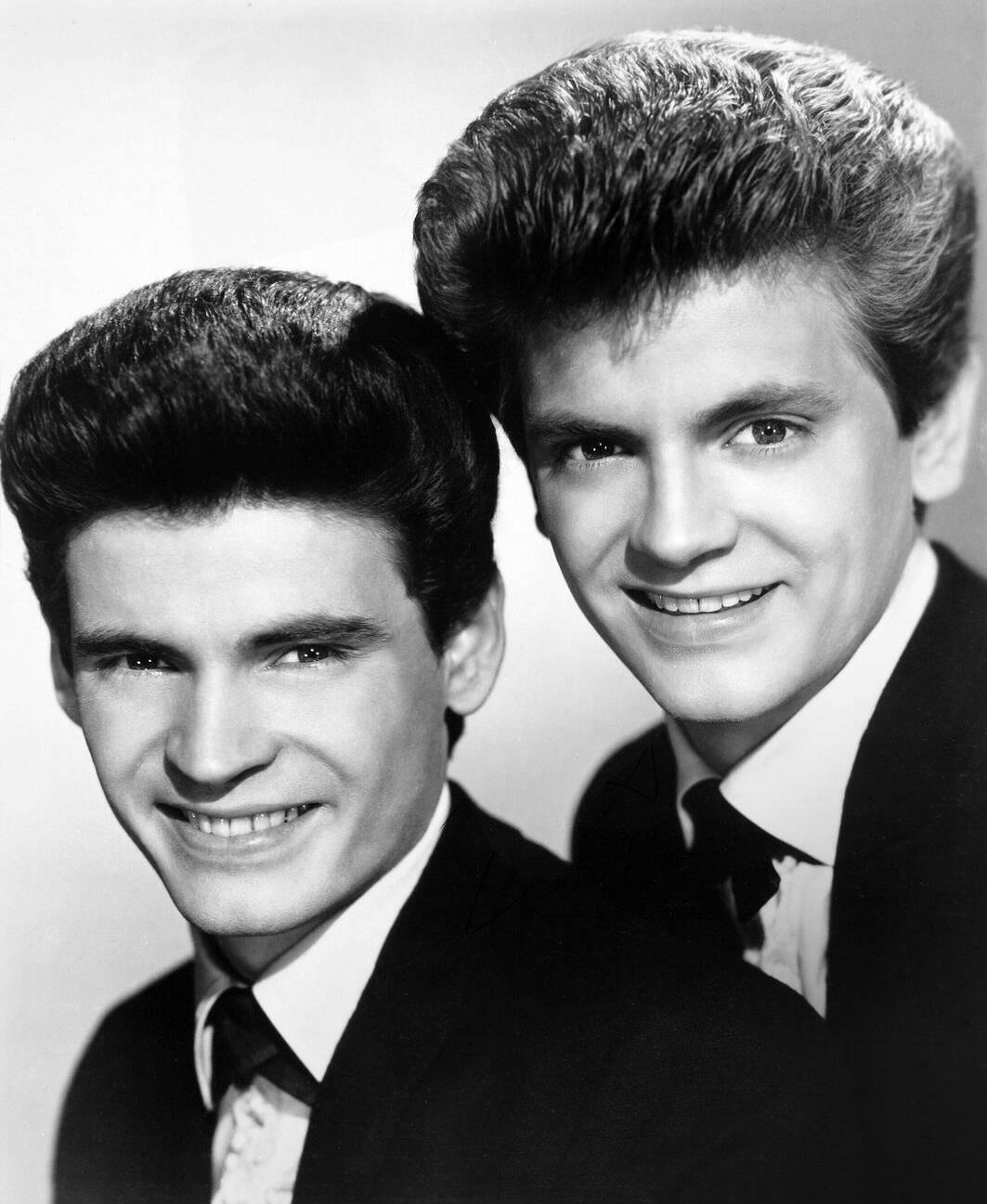
- Don and Phil Everly in 1965

Background information
- Origin: Knoxville, Tennessee, U.S.
- Genres: Rock and roll; country; pop; rock
- Works: The Everly Brothers discography
- Years active: 1956–1973, 1983–2005
- Labels: Cadence, London, Heliodor, Warner Bros., RCA Victor, Razor & Tie, Mercury
- Past members: Don Everly; Phil Everly

The Everly Brothers were an American musical duo known for steel-string acoustic guitar playing and close-harmony singing. Consisting of Isaac Donald "Don" Everly and Phillip "Phil" Everly, the duo combined elements of rock and roll, country, and pop, becoming pioneers of country rock.

Don and Phil Everly were raised in a musical family. As children in the 1940s, they appeared on radio in Iowa, singing with their parents as the Everly Family. During their high-school years in Knoxville, they performed on radio and television. The brothers gained the attention of Chet Atkins, who began to promote them. They began writing and recording their own music in 1956. The brothers' first hit song was "Bye Bye Love", which hit No. 1 in the spring of 1957. Additional hits, including "Wake Up Little Susie", "All I Have to Do Is Dream", and "Problems", followed in 1958. In 1960, they signed with Warner Bros. Records and recorded "Cathy's Clown", which was their biggest-selling single. The brothers enlisted in the United States Marine Corps Reserve in 1961 and their output dropped off, though additional hit singles continued through the early 1960s. Their final Top 10 hit was "That's Old Fashioned (That's the Way Love Should Be)" (1962).

The Everly Brothers experienced a decline in popularity in the United States in the 1960s due to changing tastes in popular music, long-simmering disputes with Acuff-Rose Music CEO Wesley Rose, and increased drug use by the brothers. However, the duo continued to release hit singles in the U.K. and Canada, and they had many successful tours in the 1960s. In the early 1970s, the brothers began releasing solo recordings; they ended their musical partnership in 1973. In 1983, the Everly Brothers reunited. They continued to perform periodically as a duo until about 2005, when they quietly broke up again. Phil Everly died in 2014, and Don Everly died in 2021.

The Everly Brothers had a major influence on the music of the generation that followed them. Many of the top acts of the 1960s were heavily influenced by the close-harmony singing and acoustic guitar playing of the Everly Brothers; those acts included the Beatles, the Beach Boys, the Bee Gees, and Simon & Garfunkel. In 2015, Rolling Stone ranked the Everly Brothers at No. 1 on its list of the 20 Greatest Duos of All Time. The brothers were inducted into the Rock and Roll Hall of Fame as part of the inaugural class of 1986 and into the Country Music Hall of Fame in 2001. Don Everly was inducted into the Musicians Hall of Fame and Museum in 2019, earning the organization's first Iconic Riff Award for his distinctive rhythm guitar introduction on "Wake Up Little Susie".

== History ==
=== Early life, family, and education ===
The brothers' childhood home in Shenandoah, Iowa. It has been relocated from its original location and is currently a public museum.

Don was born in Brownie, Muhlenberg County, Kentucky, on February 1, 1937, and Phil in Chicago, Illinois, on January 19, 1939. Their parents were Isaac Milford "Ike" Everly Jr. (1908–1975), a guitar player, and Margaret Embry Everly (1919–2021). Don and Phil were of mostly German and English descent and also had some Cherokee ancestry. Actor James Best (born Jewel Guy), also from Muhlenberg County, was a first cousin, the son of Ike's sister.

Margaret was 15 when she married Ike, who was 26. Ike worked in coal mines from age 14, but his father encouraged him to pursue his love of music, and Ike and Margaret began singing together. The Everly brothers spent most of their childhood in Shenandoah, Iowa. They attended Longfellow Elementary School in Waterloo, Iowa, for a year but then moved to Shenandoah in 1944, where they remained through early high school. Ike Everly had a music show on KMA and KFNF in Shenandoah in the mid-1940s.

The family moved to Knoxville, Tennessee, in 1953, where the brothers attended West High School. In 1955, the family moved to Madison, Tennessee, while the brothers moved to Nashville. Don had graduated from high school in 1955, and Phil attended Peabody Demonstration School in Nashville, from which he graduated in 1957. Both could now focus on recording.

=== Early career (1940s–1950s) ===
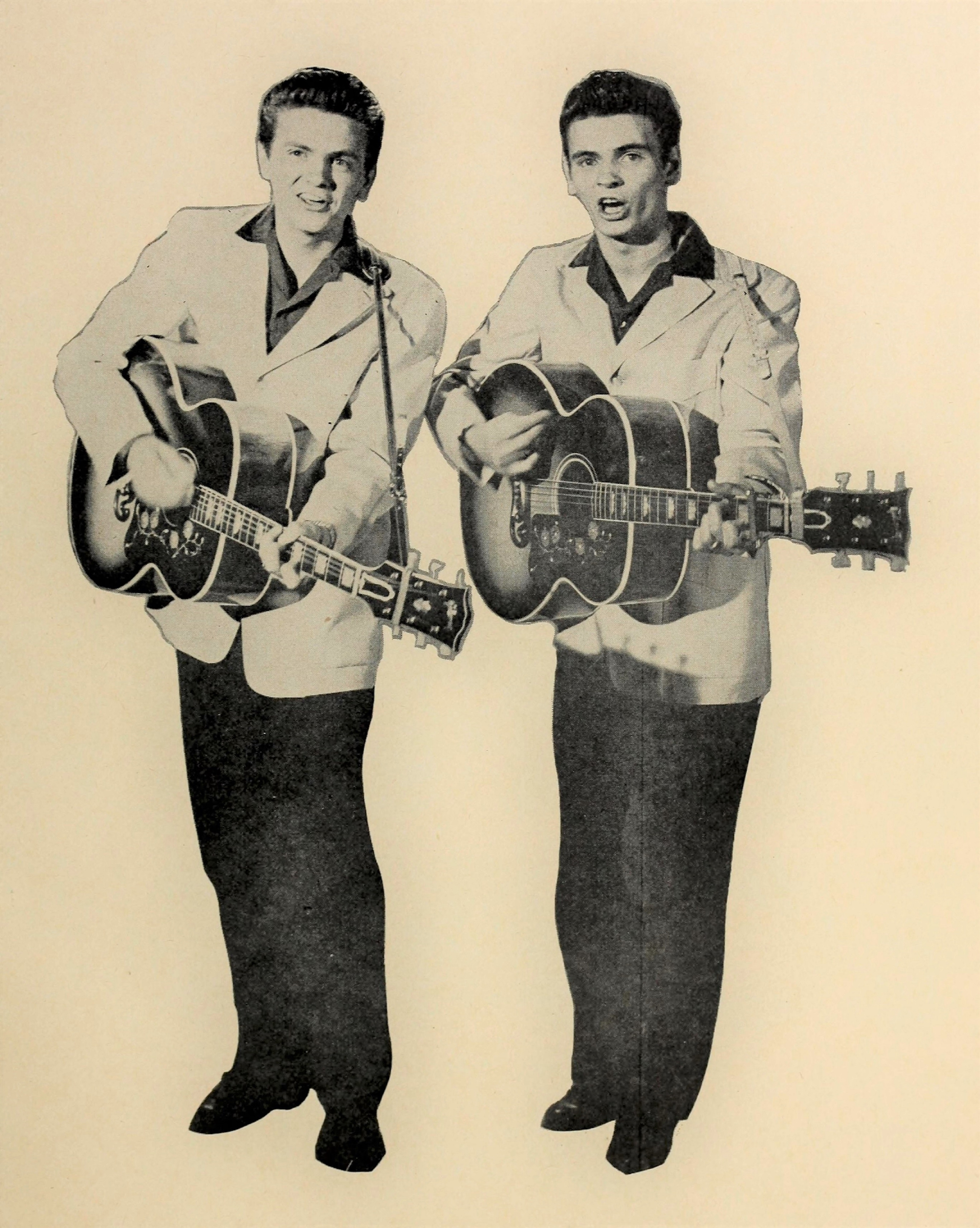
The Everly Brothers on the cover of Cash Box, July 13, 1957

As children, Don and Phil Everly sang on KMA and KFNF in Shenandoah as "Little Donnie and Baby Boy Phil". The brothers also sang on radio with their parents as the Everly Family.

While in Knoxville, the brothers found work performing on Cas Walker's Farm and Home Hour, a regional radio and TV variety program. The brothers caught the attention of family friend Chet Atkins, manager of the RCA Victor studios in Nashville. Shortly thereafter, their mother moved the family to Nashville. Despite affiliation with RCA Victor, Atkins somehow arranged for the Everly Brothers to record for Columbia Records in early 1956. Their "Keep a-Lovin' Me", which Don wrote and composed, flopped, and they were dropped from the Columbia label.

Atkins introduced the Everly Brothers to Wesley Rose of Acuff-Rose music publishers. Rose told them he would secure them a recording deal if they signed to Acuff-Rose as songwriters. They signed in late 1956, and in 1957, Rose introduced them to Archie Bleyer, who was looking for artists for his Cadence Records. The Everlys signed and made a recording in February 1957. "Bye Bye Love" had been rejected by 30 other acts. Their record reached No. 2 on the pop charts, behind Elvis Presley's "(Let Me Be Your) Teddy Bear", and No. 1 on the country charts and No. 5 on the rhythm and blues charts. The song, by Felice and Boudleaux Bryant, became the Everly Brothers' first million-seller.

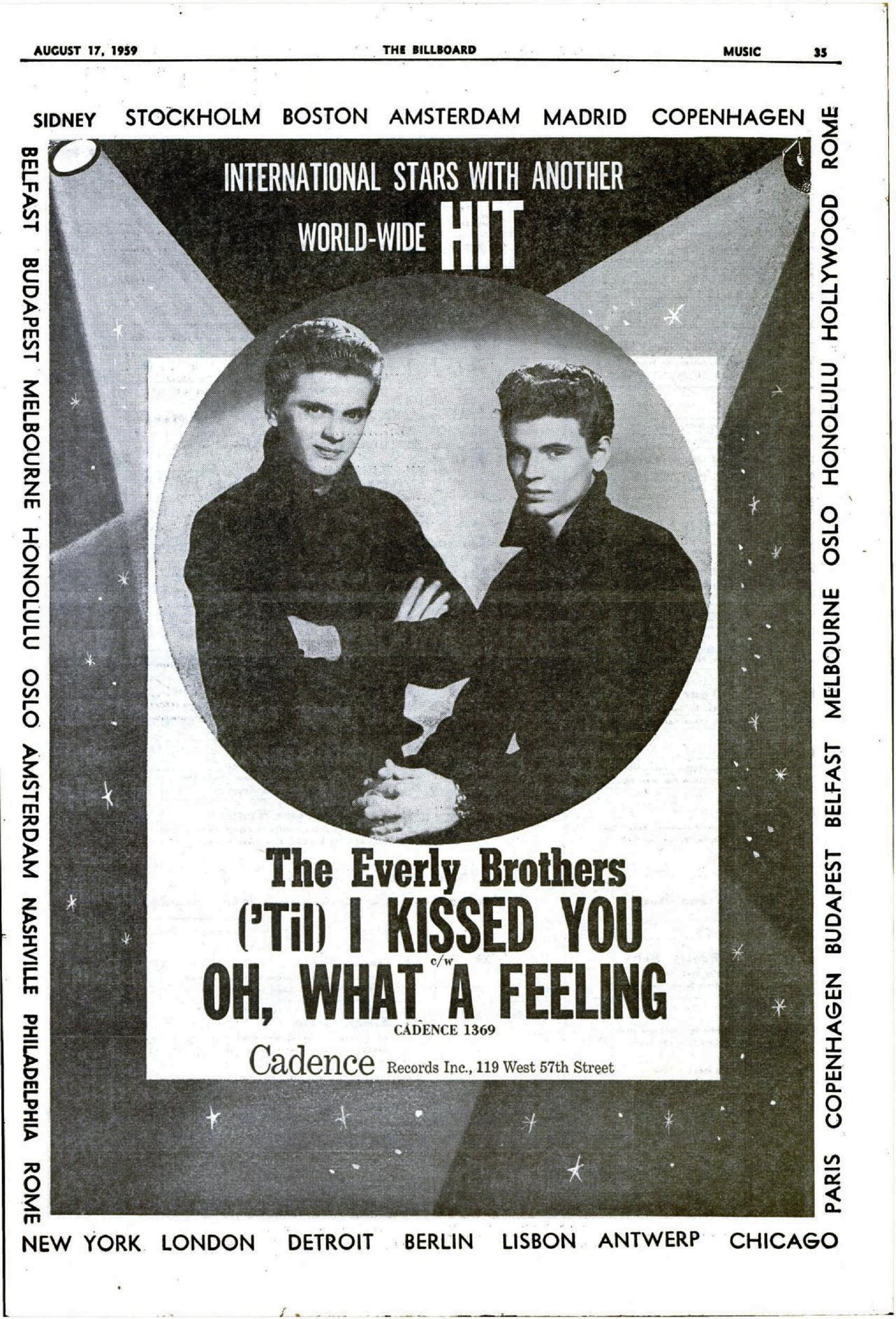
Billboard advertisement, August 17, 1959

Working with the Bryants, they had hits in the United States and the United Kingdom, the biggest being "Wake Up Little Susie", "All I Have to Do Is Dream", "Bird Dog", and "Problems". The Everlys, though they were largely interpretive artists, also succeeded as songwriters, especially with Don's "(Till) I Kissed You", which hit No. 4 on the US pop charts.

The brothers toured with Buddy Holly in 1957 and 1958. According to Holly's biographer Philip Norman, they were responsible for persuading Holly and the Crickets to change their outfits from Levis and T-shirts to the Everlys' Ivy League suits. Don said Holly wrote and composed "Wishing" for them. "We were all from the South", Phil observed of their commonalities. "We'd started in country music." Although some sources say Phil Everly was one of Holly's pallbearers in February 1959, Phil said in 1986 that he attended the funeral and sat with Holly's family, but was not a pallbearer. Don did not attend, saying, "I couldn't go to the funeral. I couldn't go anywhere. I just took to my bed."

=== Mid-career (1960s–1973) ===
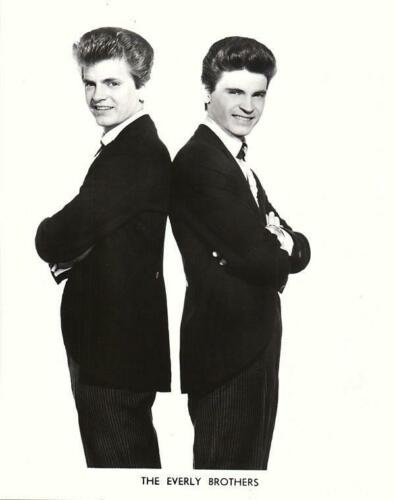
Phil (left) and Don Everly in a 1965 publicity photo

After three years on Cadence, the Everlys signed with Warner Bros. Records in 1960, where they recorded for 10 years. Their first Warner Bros. hit, 1960's "Cathy's Clown", which they wrote and composed themselves, sold eight million copies and became the duo's biggest-selling record. "Cathy's Clown" was number WB1, the first selection Warner Bros. Records ever released in the United Kingdom.

We're not Grand Ole Opry ... we're obviously not Perry Como ... we're just pop music. But, you could call us an American skiffle group!

— NME – November of 1960

Other successful Warner Bros. singles followed in the United States, such as "So Sad (To Watch Good Love Go Bad)" (1960, pop charts No. 7), "Walk Right Back" (1961, pop No. 7), "Crying in the Rain" (1962, pop No. 6), and "That's Old Fashioned" (1962, pop No. 9, their last Top 10 hit). From 1960 to 1962, Cadence Records released Everly Brothers singles from the vaults, including "When Will I Be Loved" (pop No. 8), written and composed by Phil, and "Like Strangers".

In the UK, they had 18 singles in the Top 40 with Warner Bros. during the 1960s, including a string of Top 10 hits through 1965 that featured "Lucille"/"So Sad" (1960, No. 4), "Walk Right Back"/"Ebony Eyes" (1961, No. 1), "Temptation" (1961, No. 1), "Cryin' in the Rain" (1962, No. 6), and "The Price of Love" (1965, No. 2).

By 1962, records by the Everlys had reportedly generated $35 million in sales. In 1961, the brothers had a falling out with Wesley Rose during the recording of "Temptation". Rose was reportedly upset that the Everlys were recording a song that he had not published, hence for which he would not be paid any publishing royalties. Rose made efforts to block the record's release. The Everlys held firm to their position, and as a result, in the early 1960s, they were shut off from Acuff-Rose songwriters. These included Felice and Boudleaux Bryant, who had written and composed most of their hits, as well as the Everlys themselves, who were still contracted to Acuff-Rose as songwriters and had written several of their own hits. From 1961 through early 1964, the Everlys recorded songs by other composers to avoid paying any royalties to Acuff-Rose. They used the pseudonym "Jimmy Howard" as writer or arranger on two selections they wrote and recorded during this time. This ruse, however, was ultimately unsuccessful, as Acuff-Rose gained legal possession of the copyrights once the deception was discovered. Around this time, the brothers also set up their own label, Calliope Records, for solo projects. Using the pseudonym "Adrian Kimberly", Don recorded a big-band instrumental version of Edward Elgar's first "Pomp and Circumstance" march, which Neal Hefti arranged and which charted in the United States Top 40 in mid-1961. Further instrumental singles credited to Kimberly followed, but none of those charted. Phil formed the Keestone Family Singers, which featured Glen Campbell and Carole King. Their lone single, "Melodrama", failed to chart, and by the end of 1962, Calliope Records had gone out of business. The Everly Brothers' last United States Top 10 hit was 1962's "That's Old Fashioned (That's The Way Love Should Be)", a song recorded but unreleased by The Chordettes and given to the brothers by their old mentor, Archie Bleyer.

In succeeding years, the Everly Brothers sold fewer records in the United States. Their enlistments in the United States Marine Corps Reserve in October 1961 took them out of the spotlight. One of their few performances during their Marine Corps service was on The Ed Sullivan Show on February 18, 1962, when they performed "Jezebel" and "Crying in the Rain" while outfitted in their Marine uniforms.

Following their discharges from active duty, the Everlys resumed their career, but with little success in the United States. Of their 27 singles on Warner Bros. from 1963 through 1970, only three made the Billboard Hot 100, and none peaked higher than No. 31. Album sales were also down. The Everlys' first two albums for Warner (in 1960 and 1961) peaked at No. 9 in the US, but after that, of a dozen more LPs for Warner Bros., only one made the Top 200: 1965's "Beat & Soul", which peaked at No. 141.

The Everlys' dispute with Acuff-Rose lasted until 1964, when they resumed writing and composing, as well as working with the Bryants. By then, however, both of the brothers were addicted to amphetamines. Don's condition was worse, as he was taking Ritalin; his addiction lasted three years, until he suffered a nervous breakdown and was hospitalized for treatment. The mainstream media did not report either brothers' addiction. When Don collapsed in England in mid-October 1962, reporters were told he had food poisoning. When the tabloids suggested he had taken an overdose of pills, his wife and his brother insisted he was suffering physical and nervous exhaustion. Don's poor health ended their British tour; he returned to the United States, leaving Phil to carry on with Joey Page, their bass player, taking Don's place.

Although their U.S. stardom had begun to wane two years before the British Invasion in 1964, the duo's appeal was still strong in Canada, the United Kingdom, and Australia. The Everlys remained successful in the United Kingdom and Canada for most of the 1960s, reaching the Top 40 in the United Kingdom through 1968 and the Top 10 in Canada as late as 1967. The 1966 album Two Yanks in England was recorded in England with the Hollies, who also wrote many of the album's songs. The Everlys' final U.S. Top 40 hit, "Bowling Green", was released in 1967.

By the end of the 1960s, the brothers had returned to country rock, and their 1968 album Roots was hailed by some retrospective critics as "one of the finest early country-rock albums". By the end of the 1960s, though, the Everly Brothers had ceased to be hitmakers in either North America or the UK, and in 1970, following an unsuccessful live album (The Everly Brothers Show), their 10-year contract with Warner Bros. lapsed. They were the summer replacement hosts for Johnny Cash's ABC-TV television show in 1970; their variety program, Johnny Cash Presents the Everly Brothers, featured Linda Ronstadt and Stevie Wonder.

In 1970, Don released his first solo album, which was unsuccessful. The brothers resumed performing in 1971 and issued two albums for RCA Records in 1972 and 1973. Lindsey Buckingham joined and toured with them in 1972. The Everlys announced their final performance would take place on July 14, 1973, at Knott's Berry Farm in Buena Park, California, but tensions between the two surfaced, and Don told a reporter he was tired of being an Everly Brother. During the show, Phil smashed his guitar and walked off. Don performed solo the following night, commenting to the audience, "The Everly Brothers died 10 years ago". The two did not reunite musically for more than 10 years. On a personal level, they rarely saw or spoke to each other through the rest of the 1970s, though they would be present at important family events, such as the funeral of their father Ike Everly in 1975.

=== Solo years (1973–1983) ===
Phil and Don pursued solo careers from 1973 to 1983. Don found some success on the US country charts in the mid- to late 1970s, in Nashville with his band, Dead Cowboys, and playing with Albert Lee. Don also performed solo at an annual country music festival in London in mid-1976. His appearance was well received, and he was given "thunderous applause", though critics noted that the performance was uneven.

Phil sang backup for Roy Wood's 1975 album Mustard and two songs for Warren Zevon's 1976 self-titled album. While Zevon was part of Phil Everly's back-up band, Phil also suggested the title and subject matter for Zevon's breakthrough hit single "Werewolves of London".

Don recorded "Everytime You Leave" with Emmylou Harris on her 1979 album Blue Kentucky Girl.

Phil recorded more frequently, but with no chart success until the 1980s. He wrote "Don't Say You Don't Love Me No More" for the 1978 Clint Eastwood comedy film Every Which Way But Loose, which he performed as a duet with the film's co-star Sondra Locke. Phil also wrote "One Too Many Women in Your Life" for the 1980 sequel, Any Which Way You Can, and played in the band that backed Locke.

In 1983, Phil had UK success as a solo artist with the album Phil Everly, recorded mainly in London. Musicians on the LP included Dire Straits guitarist Mark Knopfler, Rockpile and Dire Straits drummer Terry Williams, and keyboard player Pete Wingfield. The track "She Means Nothing to Me", written and composed by John David Williams and featuring Cliff Richard as co-lead vocalist, was a UK top-10 hit, and "Louise", written and composed by Ian Gomm, reached the top 50 in 1983.

=== Reunion and later career (1983–2005) ===
The brothers' reunion concert at the Royal Albert Hall in London on September 23, 1983, which ended their 10-year-long solo careers, was initiated by Phil and Don alongside Terry Slater, with Wingfield as musical director. This concert was recorded for a live LP and video broadcast on cable television in mid-January 1984. The brothers returned to the studio as a duo for the first time in over a decade, recording the album EB '84, produced by Dave Edmunds. The lead single, "On the Wings of a Nightingale", written by Paul McCartney, was a success (top 10 adult contemporary) and returned them to the US Hot 100 (for their last appearance) and the UK charts. McCartney made his esteem for the duo explicit, saying, "When John and I started to write songs, I was Phil and he was Don."

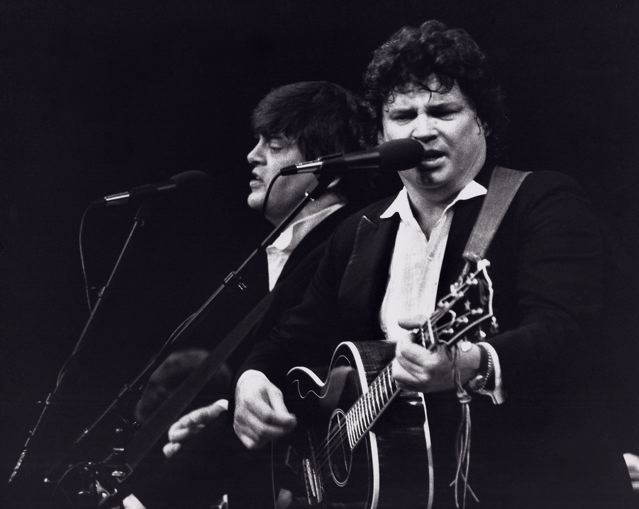
The Everly Brothers performing in New York, circa 1980s

Their final charting single was 1986's "Born Yesterday", from the album of the same name. They collaborated with other performers, mostly singing either backup vocals or duets, including additional vocals on the title track of Paul Simon's 1986 album Graceland. In 1990, Phil recorded a duet with Dutch singer René Shuman. "On Top of the World" was written and composed by Phil, who appeared in the music video they recorded in Los Angeles. The selection appeared on Shuman's album Set the Clock on Rock. A 1981 live BBC recording of "All I Have to Do Is Dream", which featured Cliff Richard and Phil sharing vocals, was a UK top-20 hit in 1994.

In 1998, the brothers recorded "Cold" for Andrew Lloyd Webber and Jim Steinman's musical Whistle Down the Wind, and the recording was used in stage versions as source music. It was the final studio recording the Everly Brothers made as a duo.

The brothers joined Simon and Garfunkel in their "Old Friends" reunion tour of 2003 and 2004. As a tribute to the Everly Brothers, Simon and Garfunkel opened their own show and had the Everlys come out in the middle of it. The live album Old Friends: Live on Stage contains Simon and Garfunkel discussing the Everlys' influence on their career and features all four on "Bye Bye Love"; the subsequent DVD features two extra solo performances by the Everlys. This was not the first time Paul Simon had performed with his heroes; in 1986, the Everlys had sung background vocals on the title track of Simon's album Graceland. Simon and Garfunkel's 1981 Concert in Central Park featured their interpretation of the Everlys' "Wake Up, Little Susie".

The Everly Brothers, though they made no formal announcement of a break-up, made no further appearances as a duo after about 2005. Don Everly later revealed that the two brothers had once again become estranged in their 70s, and that they never reconciled before Phil's death in 2014.

Phil Everly sang "Sweet Little Corrina" with country singer Vince Gill on his 2006 album These Days. Everly had previously supplied harmony vocals on JD Souther's "White Rhythm and Blues" on his 1979 album You're Only Lonely.

=== Later developments ===
Don Everly attended the Annual Music Masters as the Rock and Roll Hall of Fame paid homage to the Everly Brothers on October 25, 2014. Don took the State Theater stage and performed the Everlys' classic hit "Bye Bye Love". His final performance was a guest appearance with Paul Simon on Simon's 2018 farewell tour in Nashville. Don and Simon performed "Bye Bye Love", with Simon on Phil Everly's original tenor harmony.

Don Everly publicly endorsed Hillary Clinton for the 2016 presidential election in January of that year. This marked the first time he had ever publicly supported a political candidate. Don stated that after his brother Phil's death, he felt free to express his views more openly, noting that the brothers' opposing views had made lending active support to political candidates impossible for them.

=== Deaths ===
Phil Everly died at Providence Saint Joseph Medical Center in Burbank, California, on January 3, 2014 at age 74 of lung disease. Patti Everly blamed her husband's death on his smoking habit, which caused him to develop chronic obstructive pulmonary disease; she stated that Phil had spent his final years having to carry oxygen tanks with him wherever he went and taking 20 different types of medication per day.

In a 2014 interview with the Los Angeles Times, Don Everly said that he had given up smoking in the late 1960s and that Phil had stopped, too. However, Don indicated that Phil had resumed smoking during their breakup and had continued until 2001. Don said that weak lungs ran in the family, as their father, Ike, had died of black lung disease. Don admitted that he had lived "a very difficult life" with his brother and that he and Phil had become estranged once again in their later years. Don attributed their estrangement to "their vastly different views on politics and life", with music being the one thing they shared closely. Don said, "it's almost like we could read each other's minds when we sang". However, Don also stated that he had not gotten over Phil's death: "I always thought about him every day, even when we were not speaking to each other. It still just shocks me that he's gone". Don added that because he was the older brother, he had always believed he would die before Phil. In a 2016 interview, Don said he was still coping with the loss of Phil and that he had kept some of his brother's ashes in his home. He added that he would pick up the ashes every morning and say "good morning", admitting that it was a peculiar ritual.

Don Everly died at his home in Nashville on August 21, 2021, at age 84. His death preceded the death of his mother Margaret by four months; she died in December 2021, just 10 days after her 102nd birthday.

== Style and influences ==
The Everly Brothers' music fused elements of rock and roll, country and pop. Their style has been classified as country rock, rock and roll, rockabilly and country. The duo are retrospectively considered to be pioneers of country rock. Don and Phil, both guitarists, used vocal harmony mostly based on diatonic thirds. On most recordings, Don sang the baritone part and Phil the tenor harmony. One notable exception is "Since You Broke My Heart" (1958). Although Don was mainly low, and Phil was mainly high, their voices overlap in a very intricate and almost subtle fashion. Another notable example is "I'll See Your Light" (1977), which is one of the few songs in which Phil consistently has the low harmony while Don is consistently high. Don usually sang the solo lines (for example, the verses of "Bye Bye Love"); among the few exceptions is the 1965 single "It's All Over", on which Phil sang the song's solo lines.

== Legacy ==
In the late 1950s, the Everly Brothers were the rock and roll youth movement's addition to close-harmony vocal groups, many of which were family bands. They influenced rock groups of the 1960s, with such major acts as the Beatles, The Beach Boys, and Simon & Garfunkel performing Everly songs as part of their early musical development.

The music of the Everly Brothers influenced the Beatles. Among other indications of the influence, they based the vocal arrangement of "Please Please Me" on "Cathy's Clown". McCartney also referred to 'Phil and Don' in the lyrics to "Let 'Em In" from the 1976 album Wings at the Speed of Sound.

Keith Richards called Don Everly "one of the finest rhythm [guitar] players".

Paul Simon, who worked with the pair on the song "Graceland", said on the day after Phil's death, "Phil and Don were the most beautiful-sounding duo I ever heard. Both voices pristine and soulful. The Everlys were there at the crossroads of country and rhythm and blues. They witnessed and were part of the birth of rock and roll."

=== Achievements and honors ===
The Everly Brothers had 35 Billboard Top 100 singles, 26 in the Top 40. They hold the record for the most Top 100 singles by any duo and trail only Hall & Oates for the most Top 40 singles by a duo. In the UK, they had 30 chart singles, 29 in the Top 40, 13 Top 10, and four at No. 1 between 1957 and 1984. They had 12 Top 40 albums between 1960 and 2009.

The Everly Brothers were among the first artists inducted into the Rock and Roll Hall of Fame in 1986. They were introduced by Neil Young, who observed that every musical group he had ever belonged to had tried, and failed, to copy the Everly Brothers' harmonies. On July 5, 1986, the Everlys returned to Shenandoah, Iowa, for a concert, parade, street dedication, class reunion, and other activities. Concert fees were donated to the Everly Family Scholarship Fund, which gives scholarships to middle- and high-school students in Shenandoah. The brothers were inducted into the Iowa Rock 'n' Roll Hall of Fame in 2003.

In 1997, the brothers were awarded the Grammy Lifetime Achievement Award. They were inducted into the Country Music Hall of Fame in 2001 and the Vocal Group Hall of Fame in 2004. Their contribution to music has been recognized by the Rockabilly Hall of Fame. On October 2, 1986, The Everly Brothers received a star on the Hollywood Walk of Fame for their work in the music industry, located at 7000 Hollywood Blvd. In 2004, Rolling Stone magazine ranked the Everly Brothers No. 33 on its list of the "100 greatest artists of all time". They are also No. 43 on the list of UK Best selling singles artists of all time.

=== Tributes and interpretations by other artists ===
The Everlys, as noted above, wrote and composed "Till I Kissed You" (Don), "When Will I Be Loved" (Phil), "Born Yesterday" (Don), and "Cathy's Clown" (Don, or possibly Don and Phil). The authorship of "Cathy's Clown" was the subject of a 2017 lawsuit and has been differently adjudicated by different courts, most recently in 2021. "Cathy's Clown" and "When Will I Be Loved" became hits for Reba McEntire and Linda Ronstadt, respectively. "Cathy's Clown" was also covered by the Tarney/Spencer Band and released as a single in 1979. Band member Alan Tarney (a former member of the Shadows) went on to be a producer for Cliff Richard and a-ha, the Norwegian band who, in turn, covered "Crying in the Rain" in 1990 for its fourth album, East of the Sun, West of the Moon.

On Labor Day weekend 1988, Central City, Kentucky, began the Everly Brothers Homecoming event to raise money for a scholarship fund for Muhlenberg County students.

Don and Phil toured the United Kingdom in the 1980s and as recently as 2005, and Phil appeared in 2007 on recordings with Vince Gill and Bill Medley. 2007 also saw Alison Krauss and former Led Zeppelin frontman Robert Plant release Raising Sand, which included a cover of the Everlys' 1964 hit "Gone, Gone, Gone", produced by T-Bone Burnett. In 2007, Anthony Kiedis, singer for Red Hot Chili Peppers, named his son Everly Bear Kiedis in honor of The Everly Brothers who he cited as one of his favorite groups.

Four Everly Brothers tribute records were released in 2013: Billie Joe Armstrong's and Norah Jones' Foreverly, the Chapin Sisters' A Date with the Everly Brothers, Bonnie Prince Billy's and Dawn McCarthy's What the Brothers Sang, and The Wieners' Bird Dogs.

The album Marvin, Welch & Farrar (1971), by the British-Australian band of the same name, contains a track named after Don's place of birth, "Brownie Kentucky".

Deerhunter's "Basement Scene" "intentionally nods to the Everly Brothers' 'All I Have To Do Is Dream'".

== Discography ==
Studio albums

- The Everly Brothers (1957)
- Songs Our Daddy Taught Us (1958)
- It's Everly Time (1960)
- A Date with the Everly Brothers (1960)
- Both Sides of an Evening (1961)
- Instant Party! (1962)
- Christmas with the Everly Brothers and the Boys Town Choir (1962)
- The Everly Brothers Sing Great Country Hits (1963)
- Gone Gone Gone (1964)
- Rock'n Soul (1965)
- Beat & Soul (1965)
- In Our Image (1966)
- Two Yanks in England (1966)
- The Hit Sound of the Everly Brothers (1967)
- The Everly Brothers Sing (1967)
- Roots (1968)
- Stories We Could Tell (1972)
- Pass the Chicken & Listen (1972)
- EB 84 (1984)
- Born Yesterday (1986)
- Some Hearts (1988)

== See also ==
- Gibson Everly Brothers Flattop
- List of songs recorded by the Everly Brothers
