= Piange... il telefono (song) =

Single by Domenico Modugno with Francesca Guadagno
- B-side: "L'avventura"
- Released: 1975
- Length: 3:55
- Label: Carosello
- Composers: Claude François; Jean-Pierre Bourtayre
- Lyricist: Domenico Modugno

"Piange... il telefono" ("The Phone... Is Weeping") is a song performed by Italian singer and songwriter Domenico Modugno with child singer Francesca Guadagno. It was released as a single (with a song "L'avventura" sung by Modugno on the other side) in 1975 on Carosello Records.

In the same year, an Italian film based on the song was shot and released to cinemas. The film also starred Domenico Modugno and Francesca Guadagno and was also titled Piange... il telefono.

== Composition and writing ==
The song was based on Claude Francois's 1974 hit "Le téléphone pleure". As in the original, the song is built on a melodramatic story, in which a man calls his five-year-old daughter on the phone, but without her realizing that the heartbroken caller is actually her father - as he is the estranged husband of the child's mother, who left him before their daughter was born, six years earlier. At the end of the song, the man, faced with his wife's final rejection (as told to him by the child), is implied to be committing suicide.

== Track listings ==
7" single Carosello CI 20390 (Italy, 1975)

A. Domenico Modugno con la piccola Francesca Guadagno – "Piange... il telefono" (3:55)
B. Domenico Modugno – "L'avventura" (2:30)

7" single BASF 06 19 266-5 (Germany, 1975)

A. Domenico Modugno + Francesca Guadagno – "Piange... il telefono"
B. Domenico Modugno – "Ciao, ciao bambina"
