= Claude François discography =

Discography of French singer Claude François

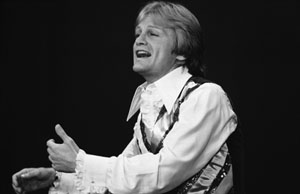
- François performing in 1976
- Studio albums: 27
- Live albums: 11
- Compilation albums: 22
- Singles: 84
- Box sets: 14
- Remix albums: 3

This is the discography of French singer Claude François.

== Albums ==
=== Studio albums ===
| Title | Album details | Peak chart positions |
| Title | Album details | FRA |
|---|---|---|
| Dis-lui | Released: 4 June 1963; Label: Fontana; Formats: LP (10"); Re-released in 2014 as Belles ! Belles ! Belles ! | — |
| Si j'avais un marteau | Released: 4 December 1963; Label: Philips; Formats: LP (10") | — |
| N° 3 | Released: 3 June 1964; Label: Philips; Formats: LP (10"); Re-released in 2014 as J'y pense et puis j'oublie | — |
| N° 3 | Released: 17 March 1965; Label: Philips; Formats: LP; Re-released in 2015 as Donna Donna | — |
| N° 4 | Released: 1 December 1965; Label: Philips; Formats: LP; Re-released in 2014 as Même si tu revenais | — |
| N° 5 | Released: 14 December 1966; Label: Philips; Format: LP; Re-released in 2014 as J’attendrai | — |
| Comme d'habitude | Released: 13 December 1967; Label: Flèche; Formats: LP | 5 |
| Éloïse | Released: 4 December 1968; Label: Flèche; Formats: LP; Re-released in 2014 as Avec la tête, avec le cœur | 2 |
| Un monde de musique | Released: 2 July 1969; Label: Flèche; Formats: LP | — |
| Menteur ou cruel | Released: 12 November 1969; Label: Flèche; Formats: LP; Re-released in 2014 as Une petite larme m'a trahi | 4 |
| Claude e les Clodettes | Released: 1969; Label: Flèche; Formats: LP; Re-released in 2015 as Claude François chante en italien | — |
| Le monde extraordinaire de Claude François | Released: 25 November 1970; Label: Flèche; Formats: LP; Re-released in 2015 as Le dragon magique | 6 |
| Claude François | Released: 9 December 1970; Label: Flèche; Formats: LP; Re-released in 2015 as C'est de l'eau, c'est du vent | 3 |
| C'est la même chanson | Released: 16 June 1971; Label: Flèche; Formats: LP | — |
| Il fait beau, il fait bon | Released: 17 November 1971; Label: Flèche; Formats: LP, MC, 8-track | — |
| Claude François | Released: 7 June 1972; Label: Flèche; Formats: LP, MC; Re-released in 2014 as Y'a le printemps qui chante | — |
| Le lundi au soleil | Released: 13 December 1972; Label: Flèche; Formats: LP, MC, 8-track | — |
| Je viens diner ce soir | Released: 13 June 1973; Label: Flèche; Formats: LP, MC, 8-track | 2 |
| Chanson populaire | Released: 12 December 1973; Label: Flèche; Formats: LP, MC, 8-track | 2 |
| Le mal aimé | Released: 3 July 1974; Label: Flèche; Formats: LP, MC, 8-track | 3 |
| Toi et moi contre le monde entier | Released: 4 June 1975; Label: Flèche; Formats: LP, MC, 8-track | 4 |
| Pourquoi pleurer (sur un succès d'été) | Released: 2 December 1975; Label: Flèche; Formats: LP, MC, 8-track; Re-released in 2015 as Une chanson française | 5 |
| Pour les jeunes de 8 à 88 ans | Released: 27 April 1976; Label: Flèche; Formats: LP, MC, 8-track; Re-released in 2015 as Sale bonhomme | 2 |
| Claude François | Released: 14 December 1976; Label: Flèche; Formats: LP, MC, 8-track; Re-released in 2014 as Cette année-là | 10 |
| C'est comme ça que l'on s'est aimé | Released: 8 June 1977; Label: Flèche; Formats: LP, MC, 8-track; Re-released in 2014 as Je vais à Rio | 7 |
| Claude François en Anglais | Released: September 1977; Label: EMI; Formats: LP, MC; Re-released in 2015 as My Way | — |
| Magnolias for Ever | Released: 14 December 1977; Label: Flèche; Formats: LP, MC | 1 |
"—" denotes releases that did not chart or were not released in that territory.

=== Live albums ===
| Title | Album details | Peak chart positions | |
| Title | Album details | FRA | BEL (WA) |
|---|---|---|---|
| À l'Olympia | Released: December 1964; Label: Philips; Formats: LP | — | — |
| À l'Olympia | Released: December 1969; Label: Flèche; Formats: LP | — | — |
| Claude François sur scène | Released: July 1974; Label: Flèche; Formats: LP, MC | 6 | — |
| Claude François sur scène – Été 75 | Released: July 1975; Label: Flèche; Formats: LP, MC | — | — |
| Souvenir 1978 – Claude François en public | Released: April 1978; Label: Flèche; Formats: 2×LP | — | — |
| Concert intégral inédit du 15 décembre 1974 à Paris | Released: 1995; Label: Vade Retro; Format: CD; Re-released in 2012 as Génération Cloclo | 9 (Note: Chart peak from the 2012 re-release as Génération Cloclo.) | — |
| Olympia 12 octobre 1965 | Released: 1997; Label: Big Beat; Formats: LP | — | — |
| Tournée – Été 71 | Released: 1998; Label: Key Music; Formats: CD, MC; Re-released in 2010 as En public 1971 Cambrai | — | — |
| En public 24 février 1978 Palais d'Hiver Lyon | Released: 29 March 2010; Label: Culture Factory; Formats: CD | — | — |
| En public 1965 : Maubeuge | Released: 26 April 2010; Label: Culture Factory; Formats: CD | — | — |
| 100% concert | Released: 2 March 2012; Label: Warner Music; Formats: CD | 116 | 26 |
"—" denotes releases that did not chart or were not released in that territory.

=== Remix albums ===
| Title | Album details | Peak chart positions | |
| Title | Album details | FRA | BEL (WA) |
|---|---|---|---|
| Remix 90's | Released: March 1990; Label: Philips; Formats: CD, LP, MC | 3 (Note: Chart peak from the French Compilation Albums Chart.) | — |
| Danse ma vie | Released: 27 February 1998; Label: Flèche/EastWest; Formats: CD, MC | 7 | 31 |
| French Disco Icon (Remixes) | Released: 3 November 2023; Label: Warner Music; Formats: 2×CD | — | — |
"—" denotes releases that did not chart or were not released in that territory.

=== Compilation albums ===
| Title | Album details | Peak chart positions | | | |
| Title | Album details | FRA | BEL (FL) | BEL (WA) | SWI |
|---|---|---|---|---|---|
| Le disque d'or Volume 1 | Released: October 1968; Label: Philips; Formats: LP | 9 | — | — | — |
| Le disque d'or Volume 2 | Released: February 1969; Label: Philips; Formats: LP | 25 | — | — | — |
| Les plus grands succès de Claude François | Released: 1971; Label: Flèche; Formats: LP | — | — | — | — |
| Les plus grands succès de Claude François Vol 2 | Released: 1972; Label: Flèche; Formats: LP | — | — | — | — |
| Souvenir Vol. 1 | Released: April 1978; Label: Flèche; Formats: LP, MC | 1 | — | — | — |
| Souvenir Vol. 2 | Released: August 1978; Label: Flèche; Formats: LP, MC | 6 | — | — | — |
| Souvenir Vol. 3 – Un an déjà | Released: 1979; Label: Flèche; Formats: LP, MC | — | — | — | — |
| Le film de sa vie | Released: May 1979; Label: Carrere; Formats: LP, MC | — | — | — | — |
| Hommage... | Released: March 1987; Label: PolyGram; Formats: LP+7" | 22 | — | — | — |
| Les plus grands succès de Claude François | Released: November 1988; Label: Carrere; Formats: CD, LP, MC | 6 | — | — | — |
| My Boy | Released: March 1993; Label: Versailles; Formats: CD | 14 | — | — | — |
| Hommages | Released: March 1993; Label: Philips; Formats: CD | 2 | — | — | — |
| D'Alexandrie à Alexandra | Released: October 1995; Label: PolyGram/EastWest; Formats: 2×CD, MC | 1 | — | 5 | — |
| Les concerts inédits de Musicorama | Released: February 1998; Label: Flèche; Formats: 2×CD; Compilation of live performances | — | — | — | — |
| Ses plus grands succès | Released: February 2001; Label: Sony Music; Formats: CD, 2×CD, MC | 144 | — | 7 | 47 |
| Best Of | Released: 26 March 2007; Label: Mercury; Formats: CD | 36 | — | — | — |
| Les 50 plus belles chansons | Released: 26 March 2007; Label: Mercury; Formats: 3×CD | 90 | — | 40 | — |
| 30 ans | Released: March 2008; Label: Mercury/Warner Music; Formats: 2×CD, 3×CD, 2×CD+DVD | 10 | 41 | 6 | 48 |
| Cette année-là – Best of 3CD | Released: 21 August 2015; Label: Warner Music; Formats: 3×CD | — | — | 30 | — |
| For Ever | Released: 9 February 2018; Label: Flèche; Formats: 3×CD, 2×LP | 42 | 69 | 28 | — |
| Soul Songs | Released: 3 March 2023; Label: Mercury; Formats: CD | — | — | 187 | — |
| French Disco Icon | Released: 24 February 2023; Label: Warner Music; Formats: 2×LP | 144 | — | 38 | — |
"—" denotes releases that did not chart or were not released in that territory.

=== Box sets ===
| Title | Album details | Peak chart positions | |
| Title | Album details | FRA | BEL (WA) |
|---|---|---|---|
| Coffret 4 disques | Released: 1977; Label: Impact; Formats: 4×LP | — | — |
| 10 ans de chansons – Intégral de 1962 à 1972 | Released: 1978; Label: Philips; Formats: 14×LP | — | — |
| Claude François | Released: 1980; Label: Flèche; Formats: 3×LP+7" | — | — |
| ...En vrai | Released: 1996; Label: Trema; Formats: 4×CD | — | — |
| Les années Philips 1962–1972 | Released: 2001; Label: Mercury; Formats: 36×CDS | — | — |
| Les 100 plus belles chansons | Released: November 2007; Label: Mercury/Universal Music; Formats: 5×CD | — | 71 |
| L'Intégrale 1975–1978 | Released: March 2008; Label: WEA; Formats: 4×CD | — | — |
| En public | Released: March 2010; Label: Culture Factory/Flèche; Formats: 4×CD | 194 | — |
| Albums Studio 1972–1975 | Released: 22 March 2010; Label: Culture Factory/Flèche; Formats: 5×CD | — | — |
| 4 albums originaux | Released: September 2011; Label: Mercury; Formats: 4×CD | — | — |
| L'intégrale des albums originaux 1963–1972 | Released: November 2011; Label: Mercury; Formats: 13×CD | — | — |
| L'intégrale des singles 1972–1978 | Released: November 2011; Label: Mercury; Formats: 25×CDS | — | — |
| Hit Box | Released: May 2014; Label: Mercury/Universal; Formats: 3×CD | — | — |
| Intégrale Studio 1961–1978 | Released: 2 March 2018; Label: Mercury; Formats: 20×CD | — | — |
"—" denotes releases that did not chart or were not released in that territory.

== Singles and EPs ==
Titles in italics were released as EPs in France.

| Title | Year | Peak chart positions | | | | | | |
| Title | Year | FRA | BEL (FL) | BEL (WA) | IT | QUE | SPA | UK |
|---|---|---|---|---|---|---|---|---|
| Le Nabout twist (as Kôkô) | 1962 | — | — | — | — | — | — | — |
| Belles ! Belles ! Belles ! (Note: The title track is a French-language version of "Made to Love" by the Everly Brothers.) | 1962 | 4 | — | 5 | — | — | — | — |
| Dis-lui (Note: The title track is a French-language version of "Tell Him" by the Exciters.) | 1963 | 2 | — | 4 | — | — | — | — |
| Si tu veux être heureux (Note: The title track is a French-language version of "If You Wanna Be Happy" by Jimmy Soul.) | 1963 | 1 | — | 5 | — | — | — | — |
| Si j'avais un marteau (Note: The title track is a French-language version of "If I Had a Hammer" by Trini Lopez.) | 1963 | 1 | — | 2 | — | 6 | 19 | — |
| Petite mèche de cheveux | 1964 | 2 | — | 6 | — | — | — | — |
| J'y pense et puis j'oublie (Note: The title track is a French-language version of "It Comes and Goes" by Burl Ives.) | 1964 | 3 | 9 | 2 | — | 9 | — | — |
| Donna Donna (Note: The title track is a French-language version of "Dona, Dona".) | 1964 | 1 | — | 5 | — | — | — | — |
| Les choses de la maison (Note: The title track is a French-language version of "The Things in This House" by Bobby Darin.) | 1965 | 1 | — | 4 | — | 17 | — | — |
| Quand un bateau passe (Note: The title track is a French-language version of "Trains and Boats and Planes" by Burt Bacharach.) | 1965 | 3 | — | 9 | — | — | — | — |
| Même si tu revenais | 1965 | 1 | 19 | 3 | — | — | — | — |
| Le jouet extraordinaire (Note: The title track is a French-language version of "The Marvellous Toy" by Tom Paxton.) | 1966 | 1 | — | 3 | — | — | — | — |
| Mais combien de temps | 1966 | 3 | — | 15 | — | — | — | — |
| Amoureux du monde entier (Note: The title track is a French-language version of "Lovers of the World Unite" by David and Jonathan.) | 1966 | 1 | — | 19 | — | — | — | — |
| "In My Memory" (Note: "In My Memory" was only released in the UK and is an English-language version of "Même si tu revenais".) | 1966 | — | — | — | — | — | — | — |
| J'attendrai (Note: The title track is a French-language version of "Reach Out I'll Be There" by the Four Tops.) | 1966 | 2 | — | 5 | — | 9 | — | — |
| "Winchester Cathedral" (Note: "Winchester Cathedral" is a French-language version of the song of the same name and was only released as a single in Canada.) | 1966 | — | — | — | — | 7 | — | — |
| "Bench Number 3 Waterloo Station" (Note: "Bench Number 3 Waterloo Station" was only released in the UK and is an English-language version of "Sur le banc 21".) | 1967 | — | — | — | — | — | — | — |
| Toute la vie | 1967 | 3 | — | 17 | — | — | — | — |
| Mais quand le matin | 1967 | 1 | — | 4 | — | — | — | — |
| Comme d'habitude | 1967 | 3 | — | 7 | — | 2 | — | — |
| Pardon | 1968 | 6 | — | 35 | — | — | — | — |
| "Jacques a dit" (Note: "Jacques a dit" is a French-language version of "Simon Says" by 1910 Fruitgum Company.) | 1968 | 1 | — | 3 | — | — | — | — |
| Après tout | 1968 | 6 | — | 28 | — | — | — | — |
| "Se torni tu" (Note: "Se torni tu" was only released in Italy and is an Italian-language version of "Mais quand le matin".) | 1968 | — | — | — | 8 | — | — | — |
| Avec la tête, avec le cœur | 1968 | 3 | — | 15 | — | 1 | — | — |
| Éloïse (Note: The title track is a French-language version of "Eloise" by the Barry Ryan.) | 1969 | 2 | — | 3 | — | — | — | — |
| Rêveries (Note: The title track is a French-language version of "Daydream" by Wallace Collection.) | 1969 | 1 | — | 18 | — | — | — | — |
| Un monde de musique | 1969 | 10 | — | 26 | — | — | — | — |
| Tout éclate tout explose (Note: The title track is a French-language version of "Love Explosions" by Troy Keyes.) | 1969 | 5 | — | 19 | — | — | — | — |
| Une petite larme m'a trahi (Note: The title track is a French-language version of "A Little Bitty Tear" by Burl Ives.) | 1970 | 7 | — | 25 | — | 2 | — | — |
| "Un homme libre" (Note: "Un homme libre" is a French-language version of "I'm Alive" by Tommy James and the Shondells and was only released as a single in Canada.) | 1970 | — | — | — | — | 10 | — | — |
| "C'est de l'eau, c'est du vent" | 1970 | 10 | — | 23 | — | — | — | — |
| "Le monde est grand, les gens sont beaux" (Note: "Le monde est grand, les gens sont beaux" is a French-language version of "Wonderful World, Beautiful People" by Jimmy Cliff.) | 1970 | 17 | — | 24 | — | — | — | — |
| Si douce à mon souvenir (Note: The title track is a French-language version of "Gentle on My Mind" by Glen Campbell.) | 1970 | 5 | — | 17 | — | — | — | — |
| "C'est la même chanson" (Note: "C'est la même chanson" is a French-language version of "It's the Same Old Song" by the Four Tops.) | 1971 | 7 | — | 7 | — | — | — | — |
| Le monde extraordinaire de Claude François N° 1 | 1971 | — | — | — | — | — | — | — |
| Le monde extraordinaire de Claude François N° 2 | 1971 | — | — | — | — | — | — | — |
| "Il fait beau, il fait bon" / "Un jardin dans mon cœur" (Note: "Il fait beau, il fait bon" is a French-language version of Freedom Come, Freedom Go" by the Fortunes; and "Un jardin dans mon cœur" is a French-language version of "You've Got a Friend" by Carole King.) | 1971 | 3 | — | 7 | — | — 11 | — | — |
| "Un peu d'amour, beaucoup de haine" | 1972 | 27 | — | 24 | — | — | — | — |
| "Aime moi ou quitte-moi" (Note: "Aime moi ou quitte-moi" is a French-language version of Surrender" by Diana Ross.) | 1972 | — | — | 35 | — | — | — | — |
| "Y'a le printemps qui chante (Viens à la maison)" | 1972 | 6 | — | 4 | — | — | — | — |
| "Quand l'épicier ouvre sa boutique" | 1972 | 25 | — | 32 | — | — | — | — |
| "Le lundi au soleil" | 1972 | 1 | — | 3 | — | — | — | — |
| "Celui qui reste" | 1973 | 4 | — | 15 | — | — | — | — |
| "Je viens dîner ce soir" | 1973 | 5 | — | 4 | — | — | — | — |
| "À part ça la vie est belle" (Note: "À part ça la vie est belle" is a French-language version of "By the Devil (I Was Tempted)" by Blue Mink.) | 1973 | 6 | — | 12 | — | — | — | — |
| "Chanson populaire" | 1973 | 2 | — | 1 | — | 33 | — | — |
| "Sha la la (Hier est près de moi)" (Note: "Sha la la (Hier est près de moi)" is a French-language version of "Yesterday Once More" by the Carpenters.) | 1974 | 3 | — | 12 | — | — | — | — |
| "Le mal aimé" (Note: "Le mal aimé" is a French-language version of "Daydreamer" by David Cassidy.) | 1974 | 3 | — | 4 | — | — | — | — |
| "Le téléphone pleure" | 1974 | 1 | 21 | 1 | — | 2 | — | — |
| "Toi et moi contre le monde entier" / "Soudain il ne reste qu'une chanson" (Note: "Soudain il ne reste qu'une chanson" is a French-language version of "I'll Be Around" by the Spinners.) | 1975 | 5 | — | 2 | — | 10; 21 | — | — |
| "Le chanteur malheureux (et je me demande)" | 1975 | 8 | — | 3 | — | — | — | — |
| "Où s'en aller?" (Note: "Où s'en aller?" is a French-language version of "Reggae Tune" by Andy Fairweather Low.) | 1975 | — | — | 12 | — | — | — | — |
| "Tears on the Telephone" (Note: "Tears on the Telephone" is an English-language version of "Le téléphone pleure".) | 1975 | — | — | — | — | — | — | 35 |
| "Pourquoi pleurer (sur un succès d'été)" (Note: "Pourquoi pleurer (sur un succès d'été)" is a French-language version of "Please Mr. Please" by Olivia Newton-John.) | 1975 | 7 | — | 8 | — | — | — | — |
| "17 ans" (Note: "17 ans" is a French-language version of "At Seventeen" by Janis Ian.) | 1976 | 9 | — | 17 | — | — | — | — |
| "Sale bonhomme" (Note: "Sale bonhomme" is a French-language version of "Nasty Dan" by Johnny Cash.) | 1976 | 5 | — | 19 | — | — | — | — |
| "La solitude c'est après" | 1976 | 10 | — | 12 | — | — | — | — |
| "Le vagabond" (Note: "Le vagabond" is a French-language version of "Drie zomers lang" by Conny Vandenbos.) | 1976 | 2 | — | 12 | — | — | — | — |
| "Quelquefois" (with Martine Clémenceau) | 1977 | 3 | — | 4 | — | 17 | — | — |
| "Je vais à Rio" (Note: "Je vais à Rio" is a French-language version of "I Go to Rio" by Peter Allen.) | 1977 | 20 | — | 2 | — | 5 | — | — |
| "Love Will Call the Tune" (Note: "Love Will Call the Tune" is an English-language version of "Chanson populaire".) | 1977 | — | — | — | — | — | — | — |
| "C'est comme ça que l'on s'est aimé" (with Kathalyn Jones) | 1977 | 8 | — | 4 | — | — | — | — |
| "So Near and Yet So Far" (Note: "So Near and Yet So Far" is an English-language version of "Écoute ma chanson".) | 1977 | 30 | — | — | — | — | — | — |
| "Toi et le soleil" (Note: "Toi et le soleil" is a French-language version of "I Can See Clearly Now" by Johnny Nash.) | 1977 | 14 | — | 15 | — | — | — | — |
| "Magnolias for Ever" | 1977 | 3 | 22 | — | — | — | — | — |
| "Bordeaux Rosé" | 1978 | 17 | — | — | — | — | — | — |
| "Alexandrie Alexandra" | 1978 | 1 | 17 | — | — | — | — | — |
| "I'm Leaving for the Last Time" | 1978 | 44 | — | — | — | — | — | — |
| "Écoute ma chanson" | 1978 | 9 | — | — | — | — | — | — |
| "Rubis" (Note: "Rubis" is a French-language version of "Guava Jelly" by Bob Marley and the Wailers.) | 1978 | 19 | — | — | — | — | — | — |
| "C'est pour vous que je chante" | 1979 | 33 | — | — | — | — | — | — |
| "I Believe in Father Christmas" | 1979 | — | — | — | — | — | — | — |
| "Comme d'habitude" (reissue) | 1987 | 50 | — | — | — | — | — | — |
| "Même si tu revenais" (remix) | 1990 | 5 | — | — | — | — | — | — |
| "Megamix" | 1990 | 2 | 27 | — | — | — | — | — |
| "J'attendrai" (remix) | 1990 | 19 | — | — | — | — | — | — |
| "Pauvre petite fille riche" (remix) | 1990 | — | — | — | — | — | — | — |
| "Mais quand le matin" (remix) | 1990 | — | — | — | — | — | — | — |
| "My Boy (parce que je t'aime mon enfant)" | 1993 | — | — | — | — | — | — | — |
| "Alexandrie Alexandra" (remix) | 1998 | 45 | — | 37 | — | — | — | — |
| "Je vais à Rio" (remix) | 1998 | 100 | — | — | — | — | — | — |
| "Don't Cry Baby" (as Black Project featuring Claude François) | 2001 | 50 | — | 49 | — | — | — | — |
"—" denotes releases that did not chart or were not released in that territory.
