= Jean-Pierre Bourtayre =

French composer (1942–2024)

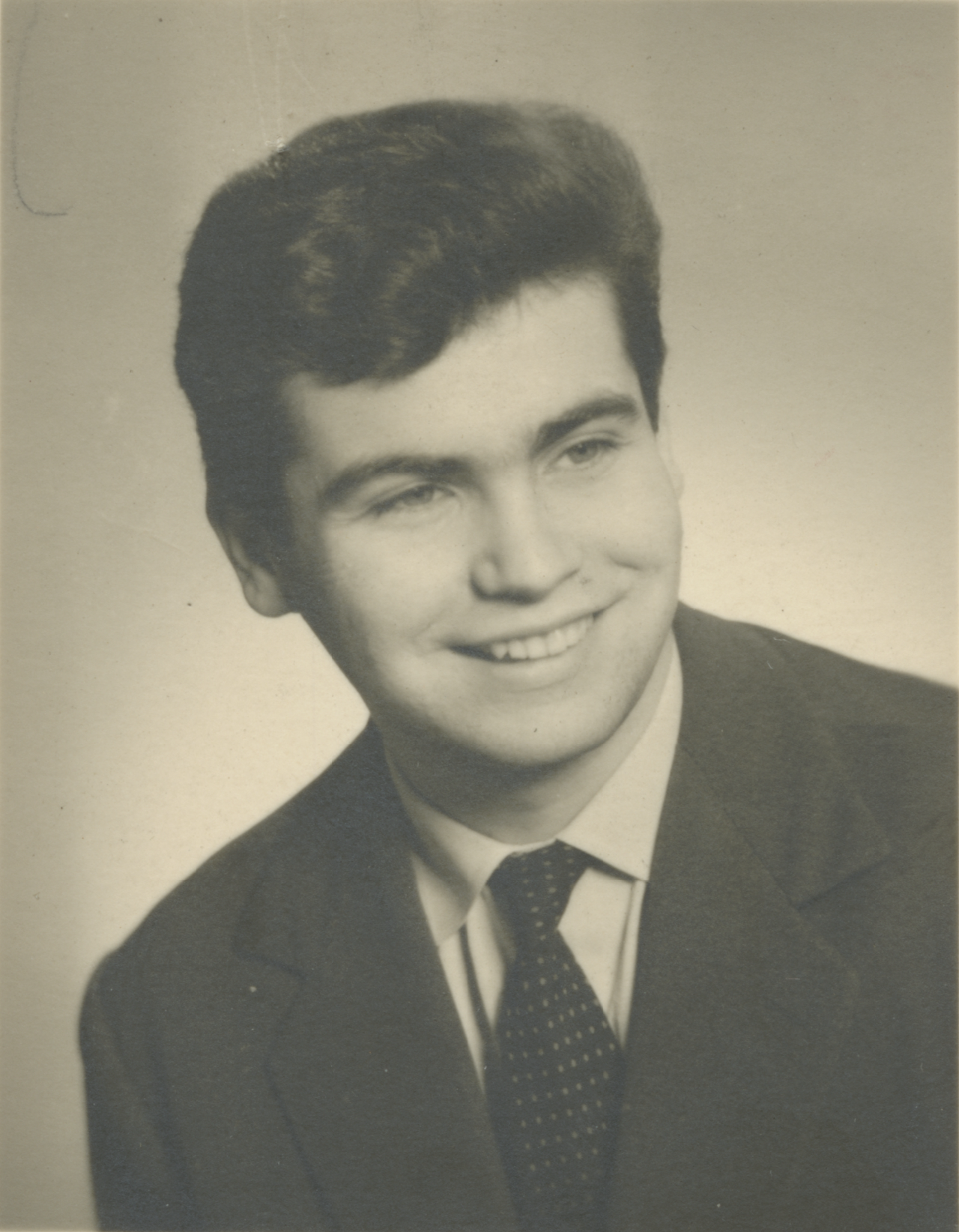
- Bourtayre in 1962
- Born: 31 January 1942; Paris, German-occupied France
- Died: 4 March 2024 (aged 82)
- Occupation: Composer

Jean-Pierre Bourtayre (31 January 1942 – 4 March 2024) was a French composer. He worked for numerous performers, such as Jacques Dutronc, Michel Sardou, and Claude François.

== Biography ==
Born in Paris on 31 January 1942, Bourtayre was the son of Henri Bourtayre, noted composer for Tino Rossi and Luis Mariano. He began his composing career in the 1960s, notably for the group Les Chats Sauvages, as well as Dick Rivers. In the late 1960s, he collaborated with Erick Saint-Laurent, Vline Buggy, and Hugues Aufray, the last two of whom he composed the song "Adieu monsieur le professeur" for. In 1971, his song "Un banc, un arbre, une rue" was performed by Séverine at that year's Eurovision Song Contest, winning for Monaco. That year, he became artistic director for Claude François, for whom he wrote the songs "Le téléphone pleure", "Magnolias for Ever", and "Alexandrie Alexandra". His song "Parce que je t'aime, mon enfant" later became a re-lyricised 1974 UK hit single for Elvis Presley under the title "My Boy". In 1974, he wrote the song "Celui qui reste et celui qui s'en va" for Romuald Figuier.

Bourtayre composed numerous theme songs for television series, such as L’Arsène (1971) and Gentleman cambrioleur (1973). In 1978, he composed "La Chanson de Kiki" with lyricist Yves Dessca. In 1979, he created a musical comedy, 36 Front populaire, alongside songwriter Étienne Roda-Gil and composer Jean-Claude Petit. In 1980, he became a production director for Warner Music Group. In 1983, he joined Jacques Revaux at Tréma. He also served as vice-president of SACEM. In 1998, he became a Knight of the Ordre national du Mérite.

Jean-Pierre Bourtayre died on 4 March 2024, at the age of 82.

== Musical comedies ==
- 36 Front populaire (1979)
- Belles belles belles (2003)

== Music for films and series ==
- The Game Is Over (1966)
- The Wanderer (1967)
- The Mad Heart (1970)
- Macédoine (1971)
- Arsène Lupin (1971–1974)
- Les Évasions célèbres (1972)
- Gaston Phébus (1978)
- Les Maîtres du temps (1982)
- Champs-Élysées (1982–1990)
- Tribunal (1989–1991)
- Stars 90 (1990–1994)
