= Belles belles belles =

French musical

- Music: Various
- Lyrics: Various
- Book: Jean-Pierre Bourtayre and Daniel Moyne
- Basis: Songs of Claude François
- Productions: 2003

Belles belles belles is a French jukebox musical written by Jean-Pierre Bourtayre and Daniel Moyne, based on the songs of French singer Claude François (1939-1978). The musical arrangements are by Carolin Petit. It was the first French jukebox musical.

The musical tells the story of a singing trio composed of three young women, and their heartbreaks and triumphs on the way to a music competition. Claude François is mentioned frequently during the show, as one of the women's mothers had been one of his backup dancers, and much of the action takes place at the recently opened "Claude François Center".

Belles belles belles premiered at Olympia in Paris on November 21, 2003. The production was directed and choreographed by Redha, with costumes by Vanessa Coquet and Cécilia Sebaoun and settings by Dominique Lebourges. The producers were Gérard Louvin, GLEM productions and Claude François Jr.

== Plot ==
=== Act I ===
Émilie, Sonia and Charlotte are three young women in the singing group "Les Filles", who are getting ready for the finale of a singing competition. Émilie is worried that her ex-boyfriend Sébastien will be there ("J'y pense et puis j'oublie"). The singers and dancers get ready for their performance ("Belles, belles, belles"). Sonia's controlling boyfriend, Grégory, laments that she is out of his reach ("Le mal aimé"). Émilie tries to console him ("Y'a le printemps qui chante"). Émilie and her brother Stéphane celebrate Les Filles' success so far ("Toi et le soleil"). Charlotte gets ready for an interview with a reporter, and her mother, who in the 1970s was a "Claudette", or one of Claude François' dancers, insists on being there. Charlotte's mother thinks back to her glory days ("Je vais à Rio"). The reporter arrives, and Charlotte's mother insists on answering all the questions, to make sure Charlotte does not undersell herself, until Charlotte yells at her to leave.

Charlotte meets Alexandre and immediately falls in love with him, which Sonia and the others make fun of ("Il fait beau, il fait bon"). The dance instructor, Vincent, arrives and tells Sonia that she has special talent ("Danse ta vie"). Mme Duval announces the opening of the Claude François Center, and Stéphane and his backup dancers perform an inaugural show ("Le Lundi au soleil"). Les Filles follow this up with their own song ("Magnolias for Ever").

=== Act II ===
Charlotte despairs that Alexandre has not answered his phone in two days ("J'attendrai"). Separately, Alexandre and Grégory lament their own troubles with women ("Chanson populaire"). Les Filles perform one of their songs for Mme Duval ("Comme d'habitude"). Sonia's father arrives, and Mme Duval and he reminisce about their own youths ("Cette année-là"). Sebastien arrives to ask Émilie to get back together with him, but she storms out. Sébastien calls Émilie at her house, and is surprised when Émilie's daughter picks up the phone ("Le Téléphone Pleure"). Grégory and Charlotte's mother declare their attraction to one another ("Je viens dîner ce soir"). Vincent scolds Les Filles for focusing on their relationship problems instead of rehearsing, saying that he, too, had once been heartbroken but life went on. Sonia asks him to elaborate, and he recounts to her a summer love that ended because of the girl's disapproving parents ("Pauvre petite fille riche").

Émilie reveals to her bandmates that she has a five-year-old daughter, and that Sébastien is the father but left her before finding out she was pregnant. She laments her situation ("Le chanteur malheureux"). Sébastien arrives to ask Émilie for another chance, and Émilie finally agrees ("Laisse une chance à notre amour"). Alexandre tells Charlotte that he is starting a band, and wants her to be the lead singer ("Une chanson française"). Émilie and Charlotte both independently announce that they are leaving the group, and Sonia realizes she will have to perform solo ("C'est pour vous que je chante (La claire fontaine)"). She leads the whole company in song ("C'est la même chanson"). The whole company returns for "Alexandrie Alexandra", then a reprise of "J'attendrai".

== Songs ==
Act I

- "J'y pense et puis j'oublie"
- "Belles, belles, belles"
- "Le mal aimé"
- "Y'a le printemps qui chante"
- "Je vais à Rio"
- "Toi et le soleil"
- "Il fait beau, il fait bon"
- "Danse ta vie"
- "Le Lundi au soleil"
- "Magnolias for Ever"

Act II

- "J'attendrai"
- "Chanson populaire"
- "Comme d'habitude"
- "Cette année-là"
- "Le téléphone pleure"
- "Je viens dîner ce soir"
- "Pauvre petite fille riche"
- "Le chanteur malheureux"
- "Laisse une chance à notre amour"
- "Une chanson française"
- "C'est pour vous que je chante (La claire fontaine)"
- "Alexandrie Alexandra"
- "J'attendrai" (reprise)

== Cast ==
- Émilie: Joy Esther/Sophie Gémin
- Sonia: Aurélie Konaté/Yaëlle Trulès
- Charlotte: Liza Pastor/Sophie Gémin
- Stéphane: Sylvain Mathis/Gaëtan Borg
- Sébastien: Alain Cordier/Joakim Latzko
- Grégory: Fabian Richard/Gaëtan Borg
- Alexandre: Lucas/Thomas Maurion
- Vincent: Pascal Sual/Olivier Rey
- Mme Duval: Blandine Metayer/Laure Balon
- Charlotte's mother: Anjaya/Laure Balon
- Sonia's father: Jonathan Kerr/Pierre Rousselle
