= Free Inside =

Free Inside may refer to:

- "Free Inside", a 1979 song by Joe Brown
- "Free Inside!", a 1998 episode of Cow and Chicken
- "Free Inside", a 2004 episode of The Boy (TV series)
