= French electronic music =

Music genre

French electronic music is a panorama of French music that employs electronic musical instruments and electronic music technology in its production.

Notable early French artists and composers in electronic music include Maurice Martenot, the inventor of the Ondes Martenot in 1928, and Pierre Schaeffer, the developer of the musique concrète in 1948. Among the famous contemporary artists include Jean-Michel Jarre, Heldon, Air, Daft Punk, David Guetta, Justice, Phoenix and M83.

== History ==
=== Phonautograph (1857) ===
The earliest known sound recording device was the phonautograph, patented in 1857 by Édouard-Léon Scott de Martinville.

=== Ondes Martenot (1928) ===
In 1928, the Ondes Martenot was invented by Maurice Martenot, who debuted it in Paris. This electronic musical instrument was most famously used in the Turangalîla-Symphonie by Olivier Messiaen as well as other works by him. The Ondes Martenot was also used by other composers such as Andre Jolivet, Pierre Boulez, Arthur Honegger, Charles Koechlin, Darius Milhaud, Gilles Tremblay and Edgard Varèse.

=== Musique concrète (1948) ===
In 1942, the French composer and theoretician Pierre Schaeffer, began his exploration of radiophony when he joined Jacques Copeau and his pupils in the foundation of the Studio d'Essai de la Radiodiffusion Nationale. His work laid the foundations of the Musique concrète. This technique involved editing together recorded fragments of natural and industrial sounds. The first pieces of musique concrète in Paris were assembled by him, who went on to collaborate with Pierre Henry.

On 5 October 1948, Radiodiffusion Française (RDF) broadcast composer Pierre Schaeffer's Etude aux chemins de fer. This was the first "movement" of Cinq études de bruits, and marked the beginning of studio realizations and musique concrète (or acousmatic art). Schaeffer employed a disk-cutting lathe, four turntables, a four-channel mixer, filters, an echo chamber, and a mobile recording unit. Not long after this, Henry began collaborating with Schaeffer, a partnership that would have profound and lasting effects on the direction of electronic music. Another associate of Schaeffer, Edgard Varèse, began work on Déserts, a work for chamber orchestra and tape. The tape parts were created at Pierre Schaeffer's studio, and were later revised at Columbia University.

In 1950, Schaeffer gave the first public (non-broadcast) concert of musique concrète at the Ecole Normale de Musique de Paris. "Schaeffer used a PA system, several turntables, and mixers. Later that same year, Pierre Henry collaborated with Schaeffer on Symphonie pour un homme seul (1950) the first major work of musique concrete. In Paris in 1951, in what was to become an important worldwide trend, RTF established the first studio for the production of electronic music. Also in 1951, Schaeffer and Henry produced an opera, Orpheus, for concrete sounds and voices.

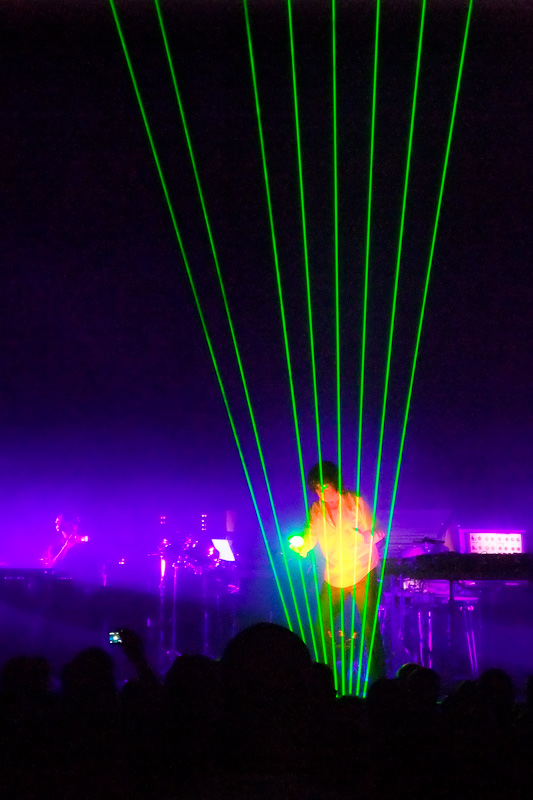
Jean-Michel Jarre playing a laser harp in Helsinki (2009).

=== I.R.C.A.M. (1970) ===
In 1970, the President of France Georges Pompidou asked the composer Pierre Boulez to found an institution for research in new forms of music. The Institut de Recherche et Coordination Acoustique/Musique was created under his direction. Since then, IRCAM has been an avant-garde institute for science about music, sound and electro-acoustical art music in France.

=== Early electronic and space music (1970s) ===
In 1969, La Cage/Erosmachine was a very early electronic music work by Jean-Michel Jarre who became famous worldwide with the album Oxygene in 1976. Among other experimental electronic music we can cite Igor Wakhevitch with Hathor (1973) and François de Roubaix for the soundtrack of the Jacques-Yves Cousteau film Antartique (1974). "Space music" and "space disco" became popular with Space, Magic Fly (1977); Space Art, Onyx (1977); Cerrone, Supernature (1977); Droïds, The Force (1977) and Bernard Fevre a.k.a. Black Devil Disco Club (1975-1978). Following those and in the late 70s and early 80s other notable French electronic music acts were Philippe Laurent a.k.a. Hot Bip (Industrieuse, 1979) and René Roussel with Caramel (1980).

=== French touch (1990s) ===
Following precursors Jean-Michel Jarre and Cerrone, many French electronic artists have gained worldwide recognition under the name of "French touch", especially Heldon, Air, Daft Punk, David Guetta, Justice, Phoenix and M83.

== Artists ==
- 20syl
- Air
- André Jolivet
- B.B.E.
- Birdy Nam Nam
- Bob Sinclar
- Breakbot
- C2C
- Caravan Palace
- Carpenter Brut
- Cassius
- Cerrone
- Daft Punk
- Danger
- David Guetta
- David Vendetta
- DJ Snake
- Edgard Varèse
- Etienne de Crecy
- French 79
- Galleon
- Gérard Grisey
- Gesaffelstein
- Jacno
- Jackson and His Computerband
- Jean Barraqué
- Jean-Claude Risset
- Jean-Michel Jarre
- Jean-Jacques Perrey
- Justice
- Kavinsky
- Kid Francescoli
- Klingande
- Laurent Garnier
- Laurent Wolf
- Lazare
- M83
- Madeon
- Malaa
- Martin Solveig
- Michaël Lévinas
- Mirwais
- Miss Kittin
- Modjo
- Mr. Oizo
- Oklou
- Olivier Messiaen
- Paradis
- Petit Biscuit
- Perturbator
- Philippe Leroux
- Philippe Manoury
- Pierre Boulez
- Pierre Henry
- Pierre Schaeffer
- Rinôçérôse
- Rone
- Sebastian
- Sébastien Tellier
- Space
- Space Art
- Stéphane Pompougnac
- Tchami
- Télépopmusik
- The Supermen Lovers
- Thylacine (musician)
- Trinix
- Tristan Murail
- Vitalic
- Yuksek
- Zaho de Sagazan

== See also ==
- French touch
- French music
- Electronic music
