= Piange... il telefono =

- Directed by: Lucio De Caro
- Starring: Domenico Modugno
- Cinematography: Sergio Salvati
- Music by: Domenico Modugno
- Release date: 1975
- Country: Italy
- Language: Italian

Piange... il telefono is a 1975 Italian romance-drama film directed by Lucio De Caro. Its plot is based on the lyrics of the eponymous hit song of Domenico Modugno, which in turn is an Italian translation of the 1974 French-language hit "Le téléphone pleure" co-composed and originally performed by Claude François.

== Cast ==
- Domenico Modugno: Andrea Balestrieri
- Francesca Guadagno: Chiara
- Marie Yvonne Danaud: Colette Vincent
- Louis Jourdan: Alberto Landi
- Claudio Lippi: copilot
- Gigi Ballista
