= Just Like That =

Just Like That may refer to:

- Just Like That (novel), a 1994 novel by Lily Brett
- Just Like That, a 2021 novel by Gary D. Schmidt
- "Just Like That", a catchphrase, a single, and a 1975 autobiography of comedian and magician Tommy Cooper, and two tribute shows dedicated to him
- Bas Yun Hi (lit. 'Just Like That'), a 2003 Indian Hindi-language film

== Music ==
- "Just Like That" (Gemini song), a song by Gemini, written by ABBA
- "Just Like That" (Tommy Cooper song)
- "Just Like That", a song by Colbie Caillat, from the album Gypsy Heart
- "Just Like That", a song by Mims, from the album Music Is My Savior
- "Just Like That", a song by Bun B featuring Young Jeezy, from the album Trill OG
- "Just Like That", a song by Monrose, from the album Strictly Physical
- "Just Like That", a song by April Wine, from the album Electric Jewels
- "Just Like That", a 1964 song by Joe Brown
- "Just Like That", a 1959 song by The Robins
- Just Like That, a 1980 album by Toots and the Maytals
- Just Like That..., a 2022 album by Bonnie Raitt
  - "Just Like That" (Bonnie Raitt song), the title song

== See also ==
- And Just Like That..., an American television sitcom
