= Space Art (band) =

French electronic music duo

- Also known as: Dominique Perrier Project (2012)
- Origin: France
- Genres: French electronic music; synth-pop
- Years active: 1977–1981, 2012–2023
- Labels: IF Records; Carrère; Waves Records; Spalax; C.Zen Prod; Deserted Island Music
- Past members: Dominique Perrier; Roger Rizzitelli; Tommy Rizzitelli; Janet Woollacott; Michel Valy; Lilli Lacombe; Alain Pype; Laurent Faucheux; Patrick Rondat

Space Art was a French electronic music duo that originally consisted of Dominique "Terracota" Perrier on keyboards and Roger "Bunny" Rizzitelli on drums. Formed in 1977, Space Art split up in 1981, after releasing three studio albums. Rizzitelli died in 2010, and two years later, Perrier released a tribute album with a number of musicians including his late wife, Janet Woollacott, under the name Dominique Perrier Project. In 2016, Perrier recruited Rizzitelli's son Tommy to play drums, and they released two further studio albums, once more under the name Space Art. Perrier died in 2023.

== History ==
=== Formation: 1977 ===
In 1974, Dominique "Terracota" Perrier had been working as an arranger with Christophe, for whom Roger "Bunny" Rizzitelli had been drumming. Christophe brought an ARP Odyssey synthesizer, which was used mainly as a metronome, into the studio. He then lent the synthesizer to Perrier for two years, during which time the band was born.

According to Perrier, he originally preferred to name the band Moon, but after a trip to a fun fair, Rizzitelli suggested an alternative. One of the fair attractions had been named after Spessart, the German mountain range. This then morphed into Space Art, which sounded better to them both.

=== Career peak: 1977–1980 ===
The duo released three albums between 1977 and 1980, selling three million units worldwide and achieving number-one status in France. Space Art (1977), Trip in the Center Head (1979), and Play Back (1980) were all recorded at Studios Ferber in Paris. In 1981, they supported Jean-Michel Jarre during his Concerts in China tour, thereby becoming among the first Western musicians to perform in that country since the start of its reform and opening up era.

Space Art dissolved in 1981, and Perrier went on to co-found the pop rock group Stone Age in 1992.

=== Death of Rizzitelli and aftermath: 2010–2023 ===
Following the death of Rizzitelli in 2010, Perrier invited a number of musicians to record a tribute album, which was released in 2012 under the Dominique Perrier Project moniker. It included input from Perrier's wife, Janet Woollacott, on vocals; Lilli Lacombe on violin and vocals; Michel Valy (Stone Age) on bass; Laurent Faucheux on drums; Alain Pype on drum programming; and Patrick Rondat on guitar.

Perrier kept the project going, reclaiming the name Space Art, and released a compilation album in 2016, titled On Ne Dira Rien – Best of All Times. A few years later, he recruited Rizzitelli's son Tommy to play drums on the project's new album, Entrevues, which came out in 2020. In 2023, the duo published the album Personal Duty. Perrier died in 2023.

== Band members ==
Final lineup

- Dominique "Terracota" Perrier – keyboards
- Tommy Rizzitelli – drums

Original lineup

- Dominique "Terracota" Perrier – keyboards
- Roger "Bunny" Rizzitelli – drums, percussion

Other members

- Janet Woollacott – vocals (died 2011)
- Lilli Lacombe – violin, vocals
- Michel Valy – bass
- Laurent Faucheux – drums
- Alain Pype – drum programming
- Patrick Rondat – guitar

== Discography ==
1977–1980

- Space Art (1977)
- Trip in the Center Head (1979)
- Play Back (1980)

2012–2023

- Space Art Tribute – credited as Dominique Perrier Project (2012)
- On Ne Dira Rien – Best of All Times (compilation, 2016)
- Entrevues (2020)
- Personal Duty (2023)
