= Janet Woollacott =

French singer and dancer (1939–2011)

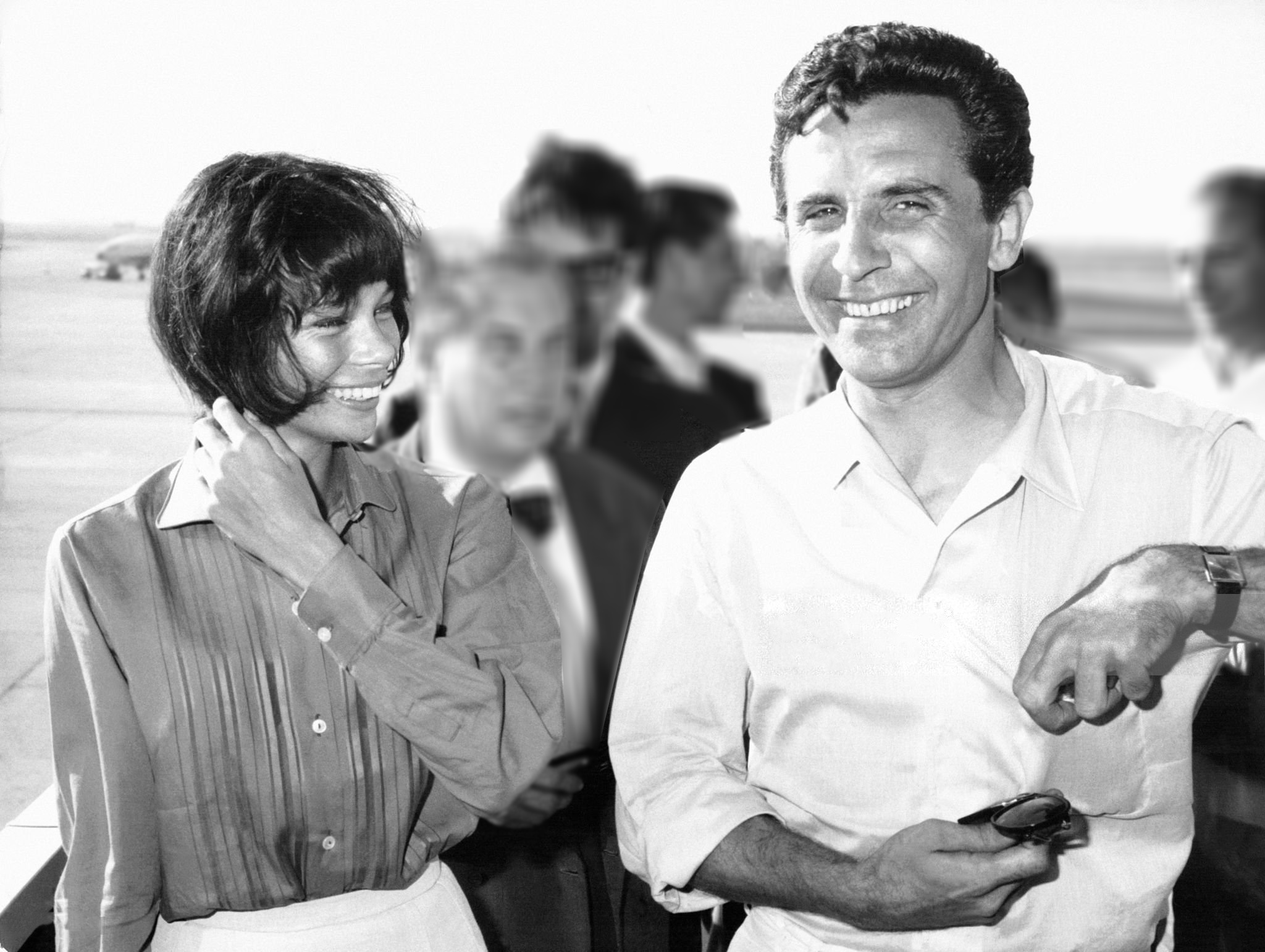
- Woollacott with Gilbert Bécaud in 1962

Background information
- Also known as: Janet
- Born: Janet Edith Woollacott; 4 November 1939; Carlton, England
- Died: 13 November 2011 (aged 72) Clamart, France
- Occupations: Singer, dancer
- Instrument: Vocals
- Years active: 1962–2010
- Formerly of: Jean & Janet, Dominique Perrier Project
- Spouses: Claude François (m. 1960; div. 1967): Jean-Paul Barkoff; Jean Sarrus; Dominique Perrier
- Partner: Gilbert Bécaud

Janet Edith Woollacott (4 November 1939 – 13 November 2011) was a British-born French singer and dancer. She began dancing in the early 1960s, working on the Côte d'Azur, and launched her singing career in 1969. She released a few solo singles and later sang with the group Stone Age, alongside her fourth husband, Dominique Perrier. She was previously married to Claude François, Jean-Paul Barkoff, and Jean Sarrus. She also had a relationship of several years with Gilbert Bécaud, with whom she had one daughter, her only child. Woollacott died after a long illness on 13 November 2011.

== Biography ==
=== Early life and relationships ===
In 1959, Woollacott was a 20-year-old dancer at the Monte-Carlo Sporting on the Côte d'Azur, when she met singer and dancer Claude "Cloclo" François, whom she married the following year. They subsequently moved to Paris together.

In 1962, while working as a dancer at the Olympia music hall in Paris, Woollacott met singer and pianist Gilbert Bécaud, with whom she had an affair, and for whom she ultimately left François. The couple later had a daughter, Jennifer Bécaud. Woollacott's divorce from François wasn't finalised until 1967.

=== Artistic career ===
After debuting as a dancer, Woollacott began a career as a singer in 1969. She released the single "Je T'aime... Normal" / "Super-Gangsters", written by Gérard Rinaldi, with her third husband, actor Jean Sarrus, under the name Jean & Janet. She went on to sing independently, using the mononym Janet, and released the single "Bénie Soit La Pluie" / "Le Chocolat" in 1972. The latter was co-written by Dominique Perrier, who later became Woollacott's fourth husband. In 1985, the two published the song "Mama", from the soundtrack to the film Adieu Blaireau.

From 1994, Woollacott contributed to Perrier's group Stone Age, singing on a number of their songs. In 2010, Perrier formed the Dominique Perrier Project as a tribute to Roger Rizzitelli, his former collaborator in the electronic group Space Art. Woollacott provided vocals on several tracks of the album Space Art Tribute, released in 2012, one year after her death.

In 1998, twenty years after the death of her first husband, Woollacott wrote Claude François: les années oubliées, in his memory.

=== Death ===
Following a long illness, Woollacott died on 11 November 2011, at the age of 72. She is buried at the cemetery in Clamart.

== Discography ==
Solo

- "Je T'aime... Normal" / "Super-Gangsters" (Jean & Janet, 1969)
- "Bénie Soit La Pluie" / "Le Chocolat" (Janet, 1972)
- "Mama" / "The Dream", from Adieu blaireau (with Dominique Perrier, 1985)

with Stone Age

- Stone Age (1995)
- Les Chronovoyageurs (1997)
- Promessa (2000)
- Totems d'Armorique (2007)

with Dominique Perrier Project

- Space Art Tribute (2012)
