= Dominique Perrier =

French electronic musician and composer (1950–2023)

- Born: 16 February 1948; Champillon, France
- Died: 4 October 2023 (aged 75); Rambouillet, France
- Occupations: Musician; Composer; Film director

Dominique Perrier (16 February 1948 – 4 October 2023) was a French electronic musician, composer, and film director. He often accompanied Jean-Michel Jarre onstage and was a prominent figure in the groups Space Art and Stone Age.

== Biography ==
Born in 1948, Perrier started music by practicing the cello before learning the piano and organ. He was a musician for the likes of Michel Fugain, Alain Bashung, Il était une fois, F. R. David, Gipsy Kings, Louis Chedid, and Gilbert Bécaud.

Perrier met Jean-Michel Jarre in 1973 during the recording of the album les Paradis perdus by Christophe. He then played keyboards, such as the Eminent 310 Unique, and joined Jarre in concerts in China.

In 1992, under the pseudonym "Terracotta", Perrier joined the Breton group Stone Age, which mixed Celtic music with electronics. He also recorded music for the 2005 film Les gens honnêtes vivent en France, directed by Bob Decout.

Perrier was married to Janet Woollacott until her death in 2011. He died on 4 October 2023.

== Discography ==
=== With Space Art ===
- Space Art (1977)
- Trip in the Center Head (1979)
- Play Back (1980)
- Dominique Perrier Project - Space Art Tribute (2012)
- Space Art - Entrevues (2020)

=== With Christophe ===
- Les Paradis perdus (1973)
- Les Mots bleus (1974)
- Samouraï (1976)
- Pas vu, pas pris (1980)

=== With Jean-Michel Jarre ===
- Les Concerts en Chine (concerts and album) (1981)
- Rendez-Vous (1986)
- Concert de Houston (1986)
- Revolutions (1988)
- Concerts de Londres Destination Docklands (1988)
- En Attendant Cousteau (1990)
- Concert de Paris la Défense (1990)
- Chronologie (1993)
- Tournée Europe en Concert (1993)
- Concert à Moscou et tournée Oxygène tours (1997)
- Oxygène 30th anniversary edition - Live in your living room (2007)
- Oxygène tour (2008 and 2009)

=== With Stone Age ===
- Stone Age (L'Enchanteur) (1994)
- Les Chronovoyageurs (1997)
- Promessa (2000)
- Totems d'Armorique (2007)

=== Others ===
- Raging Fists (1975)
- Les gens honnêtes vivent en France (2005)
