= Adieu Blaireau =

1985 French film

- Theatrical Poster
- Directed by: Bob Decout
- Written by: Bob Decout
- Starring: Philippe Léotard; Annie Girardot; Juliette Binoche
- Cinematography: Serge Halsdorf
- Edited by: Sophie Bhaud
- Music by: Adrien Nataf
- Distributed by: A&M Films
- Release date: 30 April 1985
- Running time: 120 minutes
- Country: France
- Language: French

Adieu Blaireau (Farewell Blaireau) is a 1985 film directed by Bob Decout.

The picture stars Philippe Léotard, Annie Girardot and Juliette Binoche and premiered at the 1985 Cognac Festival du Film Policier.

== Cast ==
- Philippe Léotard : Fred
- Annie Girardot : Colette
- Jacques Penot : Gégé
- Christian Marquand : Victor
- Juliette Binoche : Brigitte B., aka "B.B"
- Amidou : Poupée
- Albert Dray : Boris
- Yves Rénier : "Professeur"
- John Dobrynine : Killer
- Agathe Gil : Gigi
- Pierre Arditi : La Grenouille
- Hubert Deschamps : Drunk
- Serge Marquand : Cafe owner

== Soundtrack ==
The song "Mama", sung by the French singer Janet, known for the 1972 song "Bénie Soit La Pluie" / "Le Chocolat", was released as a single in 1985.
