= Processo per direttissima =

- Directed by: Lucio De Caro
- Cinematography: Roberto Gerardi
- Music by: Stelvio Cipriani
- Release date: 1974
- Country: Italy
- Language: Italian

Processo per direttissima is a 1974 Italian poliziottesco film. It stars actor Gabriele Ferzetti.

== Plot ==
Following a terrorist attack on a train, during the investigation, the police arrest the young worker Stefano Baldini, a militant in a left-wing group. However, he dies during police interrogation under murky circumstances. His sister suspects it was not an accident and tries to uncover the truth with journalist Cristina Visconti. When nothing comes of it, Cristina attempts a desperate coup, accusing, despite having no evidence, the three officers of causing Stefano's death through their beatings. She thus succeeds, as she intended, in triggering a defamation trial. Thanks to her friend, the lawyer Finaldi, she not only avoids a conviction but also ultimately succeeds in reconstructing the truth of the facts.

== Cast ==
- Princess Ira von Fürstenberg as Cristina Visconti
- Michele Placido as Stefano Baldini
- Gabriele Ferzetti as Lawyer Finaldi
- Mario Adorf as Procuratore Benedikter
- Adalberto Maria Merli as Brigadiere Pendicò
- Zouzou as Laura, sister of Stefano
- Eros Pagni as Commissioner Antonelli
- Bernard Blier as the judge
- Omero Antonutti
- Luciano Bartoli
