= Lazare =

Lazare is the French and Georgian form of the given name Lazarus, which is itself derived from the Hebrew name Eleazar. It is also a surname.

Lazare may refer to:

== Given name ==
- Lazare de Baïf (1496–1547), French diplomat and humanist
- Lazare Bruandet (1755–1803), French landscape painter
- Lazare Carnot (1753–1823), French mathematician, physicist and politician known as the "Organizer of Victory" in the French Revolutionary and Napoleonic Wars
- Lazare Hippolyte Carnot (1801–1888), French politician, son of the above
- Lazare Escarguel (1816–1893), French politician and newspaper editor
- Lazare Gianessi (1925–2009), French footballer
- Lazare Hoche (1768–1797), French general
- Lazare Kupatadze (born 1996), Georgian football player
- Lazare Lévy (1882–1964), French pianist, organist, composer and pedagogue
- Lazare Ponticelli (1897–2008), last surviving French veteran of the First World War
- Lazare Saminsky (1882–1959), Russian performer, conductor and composer, especially of Jewish music
- Lazare Sèhouéto (born 1963), Beninese politician
- Lazare Weiller (1858–1928), French engineer, industrialist and politician

== Surname ==
- Bernard Lazare (1865–1903), French literary critic, political journalist, anarchist and polemist
- Emmanuel Mzumbo Lazare (1864–1929), African-Trinidadian lawyer and social activist
- Jean Thierry Lazare (born 1998), Ivorian footballer
- Joseph Lazare (1984–2025), Mohawk director, producer, writer and actor
- Lucien Lazare (1924–2026), French-Israeli history teacher and French Resistance fighter
- Mylène Lazare (born 1987), French swimmer

== Stage name ==
- Lars Nedland (born 1976), known as Lazare, Norwegian musician and co-founder of the metal band Solefald
