= Lucio De Caro =

Italian screenwriter and film director (1922–2008)

- Born: 15 January 1922; Pescara, Abruzzo, Italy
- Died: 8 April 2008 (aged 86)
- Occupations: Director, writer
- Years active: 1941–1988 (film and television)

Lucio De Caro (15 January 1922 – 8 April 2008) was an Italian screenwriter and film director. He also worked as a journalist. De Caro died on 8 April 2008, at the age of 86.

== Selected filmography ==
- Tragic Night (1942)
- Apparition (1943)
- The Twentieth Duke (1945)
- Processo per direttissima (1974)
- Flatfoot in Hong Kong (1975)
- Piange... il telefono (1975)
- Speed Cross (1980)

== Bibliography ==
- Peter Bondanella. The Films of Federico Fellini. Cambridge University Press, 2002.
