= Joe Brown discography =

- Studio albums: 14
- EPs: 7
- Soundtrack albums: 1
- Live albums: 8
- Compilation albums: 14
- Singles: 54
- Video albums: 3
- Cast recording albums: 2

This article is the discography of English rock and roll singer and guitarist Joe Brown.

== Albums ==
=== Studio albums ===
Year	Title	Details	Peak chart positions
Year	Title	Details	UK
1962	A Picture of You	Released: August 1962; Label: Pye Golden Guinea; Credited with the Bruvvers	3
1963	Joe Brown / Mark Wynter	Released: 1963; Label: Pye Golden Guinea; Split album with Mark Wynter	—
1964	Here Comes Joe!	Released: 1964; Label: Pye Golden Guinea	—
1968	Joe Brown	Released: 1968; Label: MCA	—
1972	Brown's Home Brew	Released: 1972; Label: Bell; As part of Brown’s Home Brew	—
1974	Together	Released: 1974; Label: Vertigo; As part of Brown’s Home Brew	—
1992	Come On Joe	Released: 1992; Label: Joe Brown Productions	—
1997	Fifty Six and Taller Than You Think	Released: 22 July 1997; Label: Demon	—
1999	On a Day Like This	Released: 17 April 1999; Label: Round Tower Music	—
2004	Jiggery Pokery	Released: 2004; Label: Joe Brown Productions	—
2004	Hittin the High Spots	Released: 1 November 2004; Label: Track	—
2006	Down to Earth	Released: 28 August 2006; Label: Track	127
2008	More of the Truth	Released: 13 October 2008; Label: Track	163
2012	The Ukulele Album	Released: 5 November 2012; Label: Joe Brown	—
"—" denotes releases that did not chart.

=== Live albums ===
Year	Title	Details	Peak chart positions
Year	Title	Details	UK
1963	Joe Brown – Live!	Released: May 1963; Label: Piccadilly; Credited with the Bruvvers	14
1977	Joe Brown Live	Released: 1977; Label: Power Exchange	—
1991	On Stage	Released: 1991; Label: Jet	—
2001	A Showbusiness Lifetime	Released: 2001; Label: Joe Brown Productions	—
2007	Live in Germany	Released: 1 June 2007; Label: Track	—
2011	Live in Liverpool	Released: 14 November 2011; Label: Track	—
2017	Just Joe	Released: 6 October 2017; Label: Joe Brown Productions	—
2019	In Concert	Released: 29 November 2019; Label: Secret	—
"—" denotes releases that did not chart.

=== Soundtrack albums ===
Year	Title	Details
1964	What a Crazy World	Released: 1964; Label: Piccadilly; Soundtrack to the film of the same name; Album by various artists

=== Cast recording albums ===
Year	Title	Details
1965	Charlie Girl	Released: 1965; Label: CBS; Original cast recording from the musical of the same name
1979	Oh Boy!	Released: 1979; Label: Pye; Original cast recording from the musical of the same name

=== Compilation albums ===
Year	Title	Details	Peak chart positions
Year	Title	Details	UK
1962	A Picture of Joe Brown	Released: 1962; Label: Ace of Clubs	—
1966	Bits of Joe Brown	Released: 1966; Label: Marble Arch	—
1974	The Joe Brown Collection	Released: September 1974; Label: Golden Hour; Credited with the Bruvvers	—
1988	Hits & Pieces	Released: 1988; Label: PRT; Credited with the Bruvvers	—
1990	A Golden Hour of Joe Brown	Released: 1990; Label: Knight; France-only release	—
1993	The Joe Brown Story	Released: 1993; Label: Piccadilly; Re-released in 2001 as The Joe Brown Story: The Piccadilly / Pye Anthology	—
1994	Joe Brown Live! ...and in the Studio	Released: 1994; Label: See for Miles	—
1998	A Picture of You	Released: 1998; Label: Castle Select	—
2002	Joe Brown	Released: October 2002; Label: Castle Pie	—
2007	Crazy Mixed-Up Kid: The Complete Pye/Piccadilly Recordings	Released: March 2007; Label: Castle Music	—
2008	The Very Best of Joe Brown: 50th Anniversary	Released: 18 February 2008; Label: Universal Music TV	14
2016	The Best of Joe Brown and the Bruvvers	Released: 5 February 2016; Label: One Day Music	—
2019	60th Anniversary Box Set	Released: 8 November 2019; Label: Joe Brown Productions	—
2021	Gold	Released: 12 February 2021; Label: Demon	—
"—" denotes releases that did not chart or were not released in that territory.

=== Video albums ===
Year	Title	Details
1994	In Concert	Released: 1994; Label: Joe Brown Productions
2005	An Audience with Joe Brown in Concert	Released: July 2005; Label: Secret Films
2011	Live in Liverpool	Released: 14 November 2011; Label: Track

== EPs ==
Year	Title	Details	Peak chart positions
Year	Title	Details	UK
1962	A Picture of Joe Brown	Released: August 1962; Label: Decca	—
1963	Just for Fun	Released: March 1963; Label: Pye; From the film of the same name; Split EP with Mark Wynter	—
1963	Joe Brown Hit Parade	Released: September 1963; Label: Piccadilly; Credited with the Bruvvers	20
1963	All Things Bright and Beautiful	Released: November 1963; Label: Piccadilly; Credited with the Bruvvers and the Breakaways	—
1963	The Big Hits of Joe Brown and Mark Wynter	Released: 1963; Label: Pye Golden Guinea; Split EP with Mark Wynter	—
1967	With a Little Help from My Friends	Released: 1967; Label: Pye; France-only release	—
1979	Joe Brown	Released: May 1979; Label: Parlophone	—
"—" denotes releases that did not chart or were not released in that territory.

== Singles ==
Year	Title (Note: Unless stated otherwise, the B-side is by the same artist as the A-side.)	Peak chart positions			Album	Label
Year	Title	UK	AUS	IRE	Album	Label
1959	"People Gotta Talk" b/w "Comes the Day"	—	—	—	Non-album singles (Note: Included on the 1962 compilation A Picture of Joe Brown.)	Decca
1960	"Savage (Part 1)" (as the Sneaky Petes) b/w "Savage (Part 2)"	—	—	—	Non-album singles	Decca
1960	"The Darktown Strutters' Ball" (with the Bruvvers) b/w "Swagger"	34	—	—	Non-album singles	Decca
1960	"Jellied Eels" (with the Bruvvers) b/w "Dinah"	—	—	—	Non-album singles	Decca
1961	"Shine" b/w "The Switch"	33	—	—	A Picture of You	Pye
1961	"Crazy Mixed Up Kid" b/w "Stick Around"	—	—	—	Non-album single A Picture of You	Piccadilly
1961	"Good Luck and Goodbye" b/w "I'm Henery the Eighth I Am"	—	—	—	A Picture of You	Piccadilly
1961	"What a Crazy World We're Living In" (with the Bruvvers) b/w "Pop Corn"	37	—	—	A Picture of You	Piccadilly
1962	"A Lay-About's Lament" (with the Bruvvers) b/w "A Picture of You"	— 2	40	— 2	A Picture of You	Piccadilly
1962	"Your Tender Look" (with the Bruvvers) b/w "The Other Side of Town"	31	—	—	Joe Brown / Mark Wynter	Piccadilly
1962	"It Only Took a Minute" (with the Bruvvers) b/w "All Things Bright and Beautiful"	6	—	8	Joe Brown / Mark Wynter	Piccadilly
1963	"That's What Love Will Do" (with the Bruvvers) b/w "Hava Nagila (The Hora)"	3	32	2	Here Comes Joe!	Piccadilly
1963	"Nature's Time for Love" (with the Bruvvers) b/w "The Spanish Bit"	26	—	—	Here Comes Joe!	Piccadilly
1963	"Sally Ann" (with the Bruvvers) b/w "There's Only One of You"	28	—	—	Here Comes Joe!	Piccadilly
1963	"Little Ukulele" (with the Bruvvers) b/w "Hercules Unchained"	—	—	—	Non-album single Here Comes Joe!	Piccadilly
1964	"You Do Things to Me" (with the Bruvvers) b/w "Everybody Calls Me Joe"	—	—	—	Non-album singles	Piccadilly
1964	"Don't" (with the Bruvvers) b/w "Just Like That" (as Joe Brown)	—	—	—	Non-album singles	Piccadilly
1965	"Teardrops in the Rain" (with the Bruvvers) b/w "Lonely Circus"	—	—	—	Non-album singles	Pye
1965	"Sicilian Tarantella" b/w "Thinkin' That I Loves You" (with the Bruvvers)	—	—	—	Non-album single (Note: Included on the 1966 compilation Bits of Joe Brown.)	Pye
1965	"Charlie Girl" b/w "My Favourite Occupation"	—	—	—	Charlie Girl	Pye
1966	"Sea of Heartbreak" b/w "Mrs. O's Theme"	51 (Note: Chart position is from the official UK "Breakers List".)	—	—	Non-album single	Pye
1966	"Little Ray of Sunshine" b/w "Your Loving Touch"	—	—	—	Non-album singles	Pye
1966	"A Satisfied Mind" b/w "Stay a Little While"	—	—	—	Non-album singles	Pye
1966	"Th' Wife" (with the Bruvvers) (Note: This single was withdrawn from release in the UK, but was released in Germany and Australia.) b/w "The Rich Man's Son and the Poor Man's Daughter"	—	—	—	Non-album singles	Pye
1967	"With a Little Help from My Friends" b/w "Show Me Around"	32	86	—	Non-album singles	Pye
1968	"Bottle of Wine" b/w "Blue Tuesday"	—	—	—	Joe Brown	MCA
1968	"Katerine" b/w "Davy the Fat Boy"	—	—	—	Joe Brown	MCA
1969	"Suzanne" b/w "Sweet Music"	—	—	—	Non-album singles	MCA
1969	"Adieu, monsieur le professeur" (US-only release) b/w "Diamonds of Dew"	—	—	—	Non-album singles	Kapp
1970	"Molly Perkins" b/w "Captain of My Love Ship"	—	—	—	Non-album singles	Penny Farthing
1970	"Come Up and See Me Sometime" b/w "Give Me Muddy Water"	—	—	—	Non-album singles	Penny Farthing
1971	"Worksong" (as Browns Home Brew) b/w "Marching Seasons"	—	—	—	Brown's Home Brew	Bell
1972	"Billy Come Down" (as Brown's Home Brew) b/w "Hit Me Across the Head with a Spoon Mama"	—	—	—	Brown's Home Brew Non-album track	Bell
1973	"Hey Mama" b/w "Misty Mountain"	33	—	—	Non-album single	Ammo
1974	"Tennessee Mash Man" (as Brown's Home Brew) b/w "Papal Rock"	—	—	—	Non-album single Together	Vertigo
1974	"Build a Wall" (as Brown's Home Brew) b/w "Every Time You Win One"	—	—	—	Together	Vertigo
1974	"Cincinnati Floor" (as Brown's Home Brew; US promo-only release) b/w "Cincinnati Floor"	—	—	—	Together	Vertigo
1975	"Always Laughing" b/w "We Never Were That Kind"	—	—	—	Non-album singles	Decca
1977	"The Boxer" b/w "You Are the Music in My World"	—	—	—	Non-album singles	Power Exchange
1977	"All Things Bright and Beautiful" (with Vicki Brown) b/w "To Be a Pilgrim"	—	—	—	Joe Brown Live Non-album track	Power Exchange
1979	"Free Inside" b/w "Rainy Changes"	—	—	—	Non-album single (Note: End title theme from the film Porridge.)	Acrobat
1980	"The Highland Widow's Lament" (by Maurice Roeves) b/w "Silent Night" (as Joe Brown and Family)	—	—	—	Non-album singles	EMI
1980	"Little Children" (as Joe Brown and the Family) b/w "Cooky and Lila"	—	—	—	Non-album singles	Solid Gold
1983	"Give Us a Break" (with the Harry South Band) b/w "Make You, Break You"	—	—	—	Non-album single (Note: Theme from the BBC TV series Give Us a Break.)	BBC
1997	"Old Chunk of Coal" (promo-only release) b/w "Fifty Six and Taller Than You Think"/"Early in the Morning"	—	—	—	Fifty Six and Taller Than You Think	Demon
1999	"On a Day Like This" b/w "Come On Joe"/"I'll See You in My Dreams"	—	—	—	On a Day Like This Non-album tracks	Round Tower Music
1999	"That's the Way the World Goes Round"	—	—	—	On a Day Like This	Round Tower Music
2006	"One Trick Pony" (promo-only release)	—	—	—	Down to Earth	Track
2006	"Reuben" (featuring Sam Brown; promo-only release)	—	—	—	Down to Earth	Track
2008	"Everybody's Famous" (promo-only release)	—	—	—	More of the Truth	Track
2008	"You Were Everywhere" (promo-only release) b/w "I Still Haven't Found What I'm Looking For"	—	—	—	More of the Truth	Track
2012	"The Ace of Spades"	—	—	—	The Ukulele Album	Joe Brown Productions
2012	"I'll See You in My Dreams"	—	—	—	The Ukulele Album	Joe Brown Productions
2019	"All I Want for Christmas Is Peace"	—	—	—	Non-album single	Joe Brown Productions
"—" denotes releases that did not chart or were not released in that territory.
