= Le téléphone pleure =

Single by Claude François

from the album Le Mal-aimé
- B-side: "Quand la pluie finira de tomber"; "Heureusement, tu penses à moi"
- Released: October 1974
- Recorded: 1974
- Genre: French pop
- Length: 3:58
- Label: Flèche / Phonogram (France); Nobel (Canada); Poplandia (Spain); Bradley's (UK)
- Composers: Jean-Pierre Bourtayre; Claude François
- Lyricist: Frank Thomas

Claude François singles chronology
"Le Mal-aimé" (1974)	"Le téléphone pleure" (1974)	"Toi et moi contre le monde entier" (1975)

"Le téléphone pleure" ("The Phone Is Weeping") is a 1974 single by French artist Claude François. It was released on Disques Flèche / Phonogram. The song was re-recorded in English as "Tears on the Telephone" and was a hit in the British charts in 1976.

Italian singer-songwriter Domenico Modugno recorded an Italian version of the song, "Piange... il telefono", in 1975. This version was so successful that a film was made based on its lyrics, Piange... il telefono. It was directed by Lucio De Caro and starred Domenico Modugno, Francesca Guadagno, Marie Yvonne Danaud, Claudio Lippi and János Koós.

Argentine singer King Clave recorded a Spanish version of the song titled "Mi corazón lloró" ("My Heart Cried"), which topped the Mexican charts in 1975 and was also a hit throughout Latin America. The cast of the musical Belles belles belles also covered Claude François' song.

The song is built on a melodramatic story, in which a man calls his five-year-old daughter on the phone, but without her realizing that the heartbroken caller is actually her father—as he is the estranged husband of the child's mother, who left him before their daughter was born, six years earlier. At the end of the story, the man, faced with the final rejection of his wife (which the child has told him), says: "Je serais demain au fond d'un train" (literally: "I'll be at the bottom of a train tomorrow"), which means that the man is going to move out permanently.

== Track list ==
7-inch single (October 1974 France)

No.	Title	Writer(s)	Length
1.	"Le téléphone pleure" (with Frédérique Barkoff)	Frank Thomas, Jean-Pierre Bourtayre, Claude François	3:58
2.	"Quand la pluie finira de tomber"	Richard Seff, Daniel Seff	2:59

- With Jean-Claude Petit and his orchestra

7-inch single (1974 Canada)

No.	Title	Writer(s)	Length
1.	"Le téléphone pleure" (with Frédérique Barkoff)	Frank Thomas, Jean-Pierre Bourtayre, Claude François	3:58
2.	"Heureusement, tu penses à moi"	Jean-Michel Rivat, Claude François, Simon Shirak	3:30

- With Jean-Claude Petit and his orchestra

=== Foreign versions ===
7-inch single (1975 Spain)

No.	Title	Writer(s)	Length
1.	"Llora el teléfono"	Frank Thomas, Jean-Pierre Bourtayre, Claude François	3:58
2.	"Chanson populaire"	Nicolas Skorsky, Jean-Pierre Bourtayre	3:34

7-inch single (1975 UK)

No.	Title	Writer(s)	Length
1.	"Tears on the Telephone" (with Kathy Barnet)	Frank Thomas, Jean-Pierre Bourtayre, Claude François
2.	"Hello Happiness"	Roger Greenaway, Les Reed

7-inch single (1975 Italy)

No.	Title	Writer(s)	Length
1.	"Piange... il telefono" (with Francesca Guadagno)	Frank Thomas, Jean-Pierre Bourtayre, Claude François
2.	"L'avventura"	Domenico Modugno

7-inch single (1975 Brazil)

No.	Title	Writer(s)	Length
1.	"O telefone chora" (with Márcio José and Liriel)	Frank Thomas, Jean-Pierre Bourtayre, Claude François
2.	"Que será, que será, que será?"	Márcio José

== See also ==
- List of best-selling singles in France
