= Stone Age (band) =

French pop rock band

- Origin: Paris, France
- Genres: Pop rock; electro; Celtic rock; Breton; world; new age
- Years active: 1992–present
- Labels: Coop Breizh; Keltia; Glaz Music & Publishing; Columbia/Sony
- Spinoff of: Gwendal
- Members: Michel Valy; Marc Hazon; Jérôme Guéguen; Dominique Perrier
- Website: Official website

Stone Age is a French pop rock band that combines Celtic, primarily Breton, themes with contemporary electronic arrangements, with the addition of world and new age elements. Originally from Paris, the group is composed of Michel Valy, Marc Hazon, Jérôme Guéguen, and Dominique Perrier. Stone Age has released five studio albums to date: Stone Age (1994), Les Chronovoyageurs (1997), Promessa (2000), Totems d'Armorique (2007), and Bubry Road (2022).

== History ==
Stone Age was formed in 1992 in Paris by three former members of the instrumental Breton group Gwendal: Bassist Michel "Kervador" Valy, who had previously worked with Breton musician Alan Stivell, Canadian singer Robert Charlebois, as well as French singers Jean-Patrick Capdevielle and Philippe Lavil; keyboardist Jérôme "Lach'ilaouët" Guéguen, who had collaborated with new-age composer Jean-Michel Jarre; and drummer Marc "Ponkallec" Hazon, who had played on Sheila's 1980 album, Pilote sur les ondes. They added keyboardist Dominique "Terracotta" Perrier, who has also worked with Jarre.

Writing songs that incorporated elements of Celtic, primarily Breton music, with world and new age compositions, into a pop rock and electro sound, the group released their debut, self-titled album in 1994. It included guest vocals by Janet Woollacott, who went on to marry Perrier. The record earned them a Victoires de la Musique nomination the following year in the World Music category.

In 1997, they issued their sophomore album, Les Chronovoyageurs, which also featured Woollacott on vocals, as well as other guest musicians, such as guitarist Patrick Rondat, hurdy-gurdy player Gilles Chabenat, and multi-instrumentalists Loïc Taillebrest and Robert Le Gall.

Stone Age's third album, Promessa, came out in 2000. Seven years later, they issued Totems d'Armorique. After a fourteen-year hiatus, the band returned in 2021 with the announcement of a fifth studio album, titled Bubry Road, which was released the following year.

== Band members ==
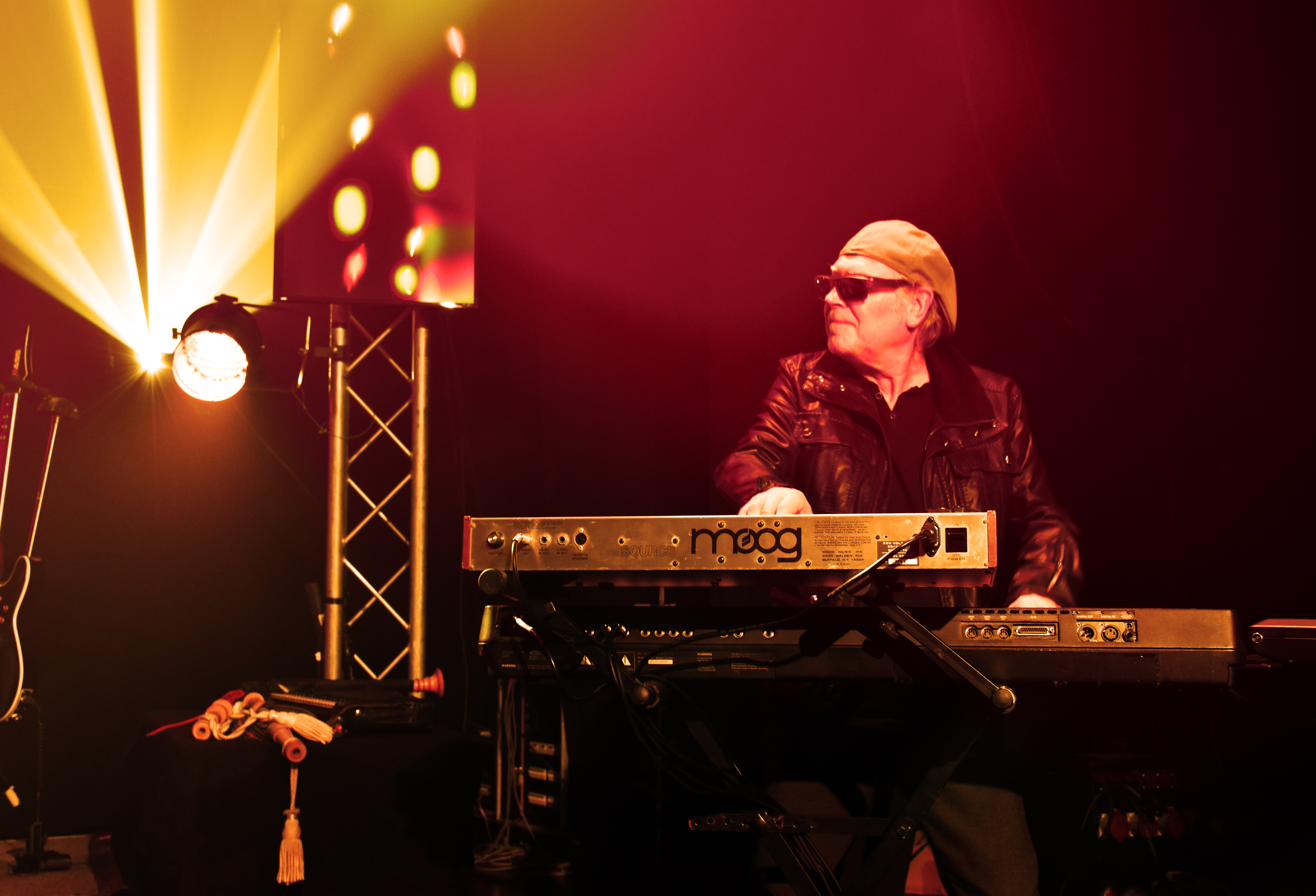
Jérôme "Lach'ilaouët" Guéguen

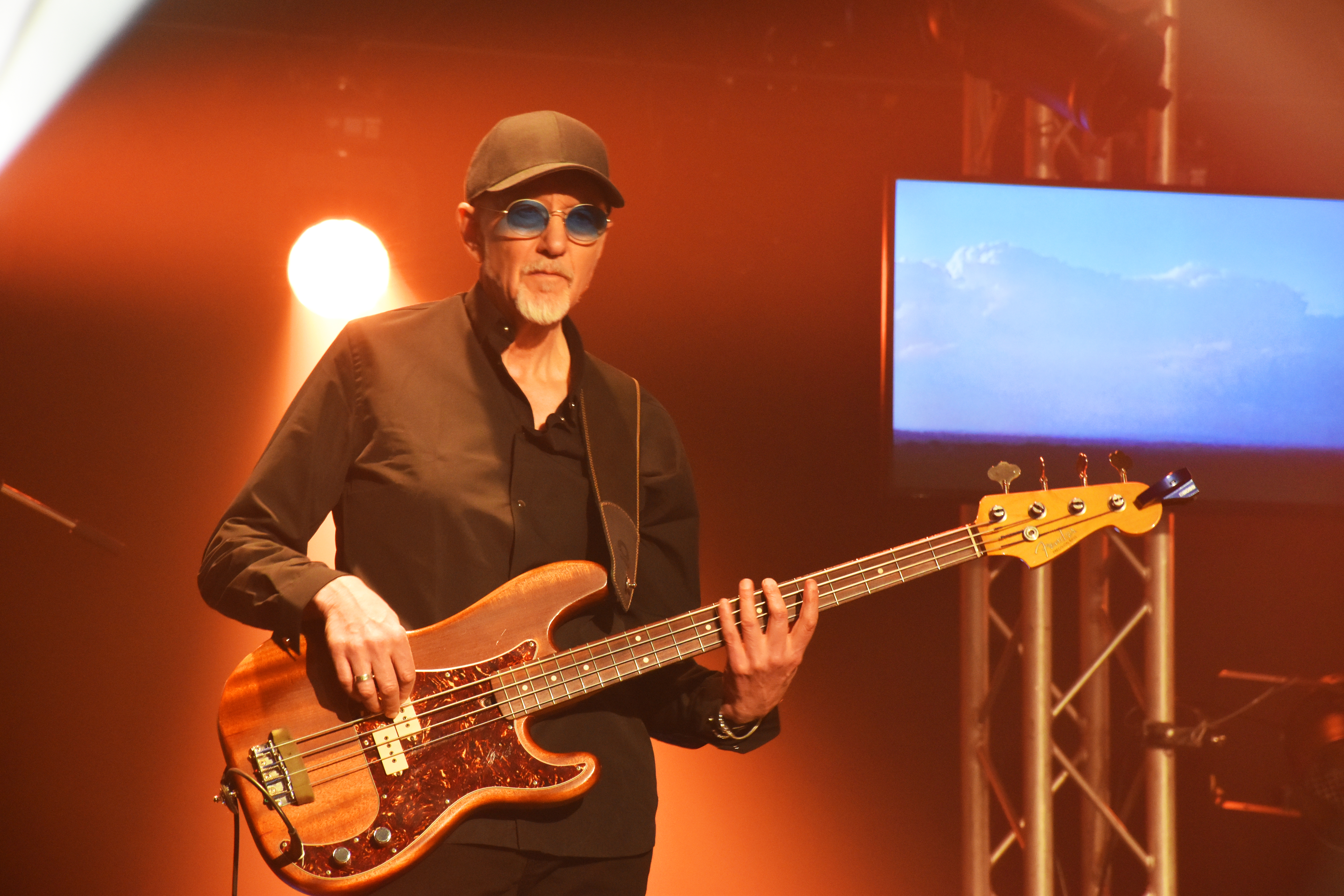
Michel "Kervador" Valy

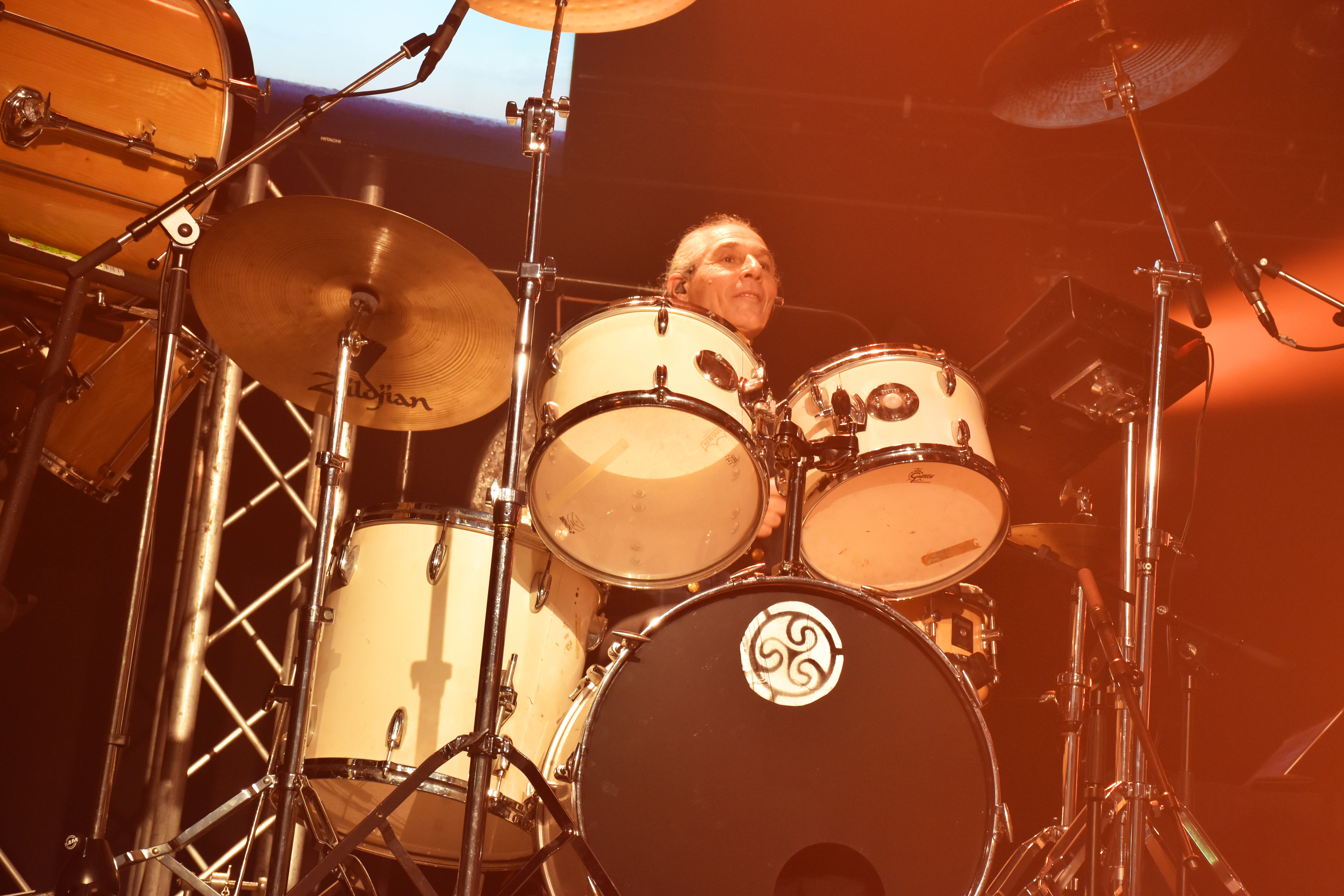
Marc "Ponkallec" Hazon
- Jérôme "Lach'ilaouët" Guéguen – keyboards, vocals
- Michel "Kervador" Valy – bass, vocals
- Marc "Ponkallec" Hazon – drums, percussion, guitar, vocals
- Dominique "Terracotta" Perrier – keyboards

== Discography ==
- Stone Age (1994)
- Les Chronovoyageurs (1997)
- Promessa (2000)
- Totems d'Armorique (2007)
- Bubry Road (2022)
