= Alexandrie Alexandra =

1978 single by Claude François

Single by Claude François

from the album Magnolias for Ever
- B-side: "Ève"
- Released: 15 March 1978
- Recorded: 31 October 1977
- Studio: Trident, London
- Genre: Disco
- Length: 4:21
- Label: Flèche
- Songwriters: Claude François; Jean-Pierre Bourtayre; Étienne Roda-Gil

Claude François singles chronology
"Bordeaux Rosé" (1978)	"Alexandrie Alexandra" (1978)	"I'm Leaving for the Last Time" (1978)

"Alexandrie Alexandra" (French: [alɛksɑ̃dʁi alɛksɑ̃dʁa]) is a song by French singer Claude François, released in March 1978 as a single from his final studio album Magnolias for Ever. The single topped the French charts for several charts and has gone on to become one of his most popular songs.

== Background ==
In 1977, whilst in France to promote his latest album, Peddlin' Music on the Side, Lamont Dozier met François on the television show Musique and Music. The two became friends and François invited Dozier to have dinner at his home, the Moulin de Dannemois, where he introduced him to composer Jean-Pierre Bourtayre. After eating, Dozier played the introduction to his song "Going Back to My Roots" (which would later become popularised by Odyssey in 1981). The introduction later inspired François to write "Alexandrie Alexandra". The lyrics were written by Étienne Roda-Gil, who had previously refused to work with François as he wanted to write intellectual and meaningful songs rather than popular songs. However, after realising that he had no reason to be a "snob", Roda-Gil decided to write lyrics for several of François' songs. François did not understand all the metaphorical subtleties of the lyrics for "Alexandrie Alexandra", and he tongue-in-cheek told Roda-Gil that it would be the first time he would sing a song without understanding the lyrics.

== Recording and release ==
"Alexandrie Alexandra" was recorded on 31 October 1977 at Trident Studios in London. It was first released on François' album Magnolias for Ever in December 1977. For the single, the song was mixed by Bernard Estardy on 9 February 1978 at CBE Studios in Paris. François died due to accidental electrocution on 11 March 1978 and his funeral took place several days later on 15 March. This was also the date "Alexandrie Alexandra" was released as a single, though this was more than likely a coincidence rather than a commercial strategy from the record label. There is no doubt, however, that François' death help propel sales of the single with an estimated 1.6 million copies within a month of its release.

In March 1998, a techno remix of "Alexandrie Alexandra" was released as a twentieth anniversary single. It peaked at number 45 on the French Singles Chart. For the fortieth anniversary, an extended version of the song was released digitally in December 2017, and two further releases came in early 2018. A selection of remixes were also released in July 2023.

The song was part of the 2024 Summer Olympics opening ceremony.

== Personnel ==
Musicians

- Claude François – vocals
- Peter Van Hooke – drums
- Mo Foster – bass guitar
- Lance Dixon – keyboards
- Slim Pezin – guitar
- Bernard Estardy – synthesiser
- Frank Ricotti – percussion
- Ray Cooper – percussion
- Marc Chantereau – percussion

Technical

- Stephen W Tayler – mixing
- Bernard Estardy – mixing
- Slim Pezin – rhythm section arrangements
- Raymond Donnez – brass and strings arrangements
- Léonard de Raemy – photography

== Charts ==
=== Weekly charts ===
Chart (1978)	Peak position
Belgium (Ultratop 50 Flanders)	17
France (IFOP)	1

Chart (1998)	Peak position
Belgium (Ultratop 50 Wallonia)	37
France (SNEP)	45

=== Year-end charts ===
Chart (1978)	Position
France (IFOP)	9
