= Adieu monsieur le professeur =

Single by Star Academy 4

from the album Les Meilleurs Moments
- B-side: "Les Matins d'hiver"
- Released: December 13, 2004
- Recorded: France, 2004
- Genre: Pop
- Length: 3:57
- Label: Mercury, Universal Music
- Songwriters: Jean-Pierre Bourtayre; Vline Buggy; Hugues Aufray
- Producer: Marco Beacco

Star Academy 4 singles chronology
"En chantant" (2004)	"Adieu monsieur le professeur" (2004)

"Adieu monsieur le professeur" ("Goodbye, Mr. Professor") is a 1968 song recorded by French singer Hugues Aufray. The song was written and the music composed by Jean-Pierre Bourtayre, Vline Buggy and the singer himself, and was later included in 2007 on Aufray's best of Les 50 plus belles chansons. Contestants from season 4 of the French music talent show Star Academy covered the song in 2004, achieving success.

== Song information ==
In France, the song was notably covered by Star Academy 4 in 2004. Released on December 13, 2004, as third single from the album Les Meilleurs Moments, on which it features as second track in both singing and instrumental versions, the song had success in France and Belgium (Wallonia) where it was a top ten hit. It appears on many French compilations such as Hits For Teens, Hits Superstars 2005, Only Hits 2005 and La Saga des hits, and was included on the charity album Solidarité Asie. Oscar Sisto, the TV reality show's teacher of theater, features in the music video for the song. Nine of the contestants participated in the vocals.

In France, the single went to number 88 on December 5, 2004, then climbed to number 6, then to number 2 and eventually topped the chart for a sole week. It then dropped every week and totaled six weeks in the top ten, 12 weeks in the top 50 and 18 weeks on the chart (top 100). The song was less successful in Belgium: it entered the chart at number 22 on December 25, 2004, then entered the top ten in which it remained for five weeks, with a peak at number 7 in its third week. It fell off the chart (top 40) after 11 weeks.

== Track listings ==
CD single

1. "Adieu monsieur le professeur" — 3:57
2. "Les Matins d'hiver" — 3:15
3. "Adieu monsieur le professeur" (instrumental) — 3:57

== Charts ==
=== Peak positions ===
Chart (2004–05)	Peak position
Belgian (Wallonia) Singles Chart	7
French SNEP Singles Chart	1
Swiss Singles Chart	38

=== Year-end charts ===
Chart (2004)	Position
French Singles Chart	53

Chart (2005)	Position
Europe (Eurochart Hot 100)	85
French Singles Chart	66
