= Claude François =

French singer, songwriter and dancer (1939–1978)

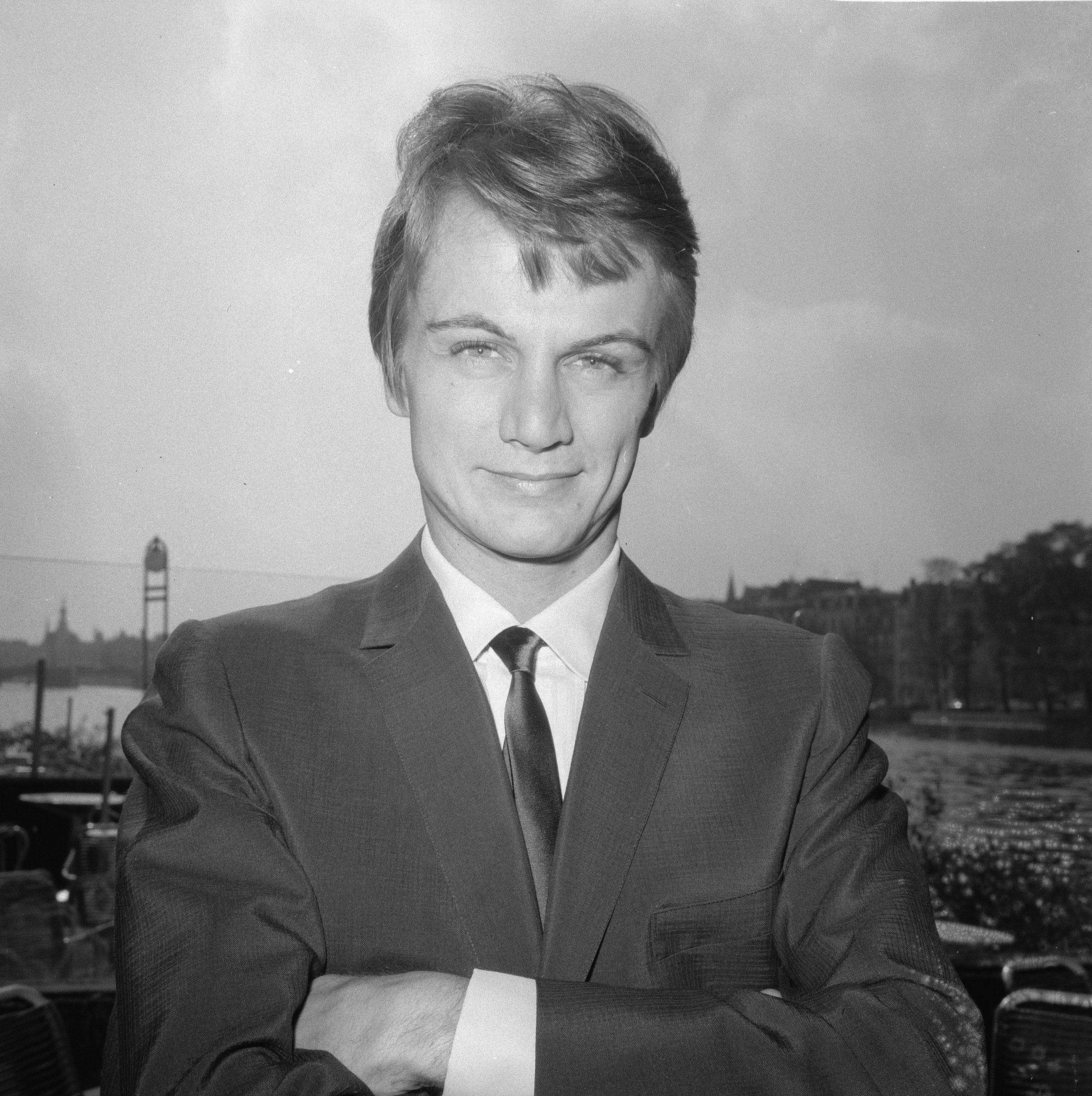
- François in Amsterdam in 1965

Background information
- Also known as: Cloclo
- Born: Claude Antoine Marie François; 1 February 1939; Ismailia, Kingdom of Egypt
- Died: 11 March 1978 (aged 39) Paris, France
- Genre: Pop
- Occupations: Musician; singer; songwriter; record producer; editor-in-chief
- Instruments: Vocals; violin; percussion; drums
- Works: Discography
- Years active: 1950s–1978
- Labels: Fontana; Phillips; Flèche; Phonogram
- Spouse: Janet Woollacott (m. 1960; div. 1967)

Claude Antoine Marie François (French pronunciation: [klod ɑ̃twan maʁi fʁɑ̃swa]; 1 February 1939 – 11 March 1978), also known by the nickname Cloclo, was an Egyptian-born French pop singer, composer, songwriter, record producer, drummer and dancer. François co-wrote the lyrics of "Comme d'habitude" (composed by Jacques Revaux), the original version of "My Way", and composed the music of "Parce que je t'aime mon enfant", the original version of "My Boy". Among his other famous songs are "Le téléphone pleure", "Le lundi au soleil", "Magnolias for Ever" and "Alexandrie Alexandra". He also enjoyed considerable success with French-language versions of English-language songs, including "Belles! Belles! Belles!" (The Everly Brothers' "Made to Love"), "Cette année là" ("December, 1963 (Oh, What a Night)") and "Je vais à Rio" ("I Go to Rio").

François sold more than 20 million records during his career, and 6 million since his death. He was about to embark for the United States when he was accidentally electrocuted in March 1978 at age 39. Former French President Valéry Giscard d'Estaing is quoted as saying Claude François was, to him, "the French equivalent of The Beatles, meaning the great talent of a generation".

== Early life ==
The son of a French father and an Italian mother, Claude Antoine Marie François was born in the Egyptian city of Ismailia, where his father, Aimé François (1908–1961), was working as a senior manager in the Anglo-French Suez canal company on the Suez Canal. In 1951, the job took the family to the city of Port Tewfik (now Suez Port). François had an older sister, Josette (born 1934), who wrote her memoirs in 2008.

François' mother, Lucia Mazzei (1910–1992) was very musical and had her son take piano and violin lessons. On his own, the boy learned to play the drums. As a result of the 1956 Suez Crisis, the family returned to live in Monaco. The family's expulsion from Egypt was traumatic. They struggled financially after François' father fell ill and could not work. François found a job as a bank clerk and at night earned extra money playing drums with an orchestra at the luxury hotels along the French Riviera. With a good singing voice, he was offered a chance to sing at a hotel in the fashionable Mediterranean resort town of Juan-les-Pins. His show was well received, and he began to perform at the nightclubs along the Côte d'Azur, including the Monte-Carlo Sporting, where in 1959, he met Janet Woollacott; they wed in 1960.

== Professional career ==
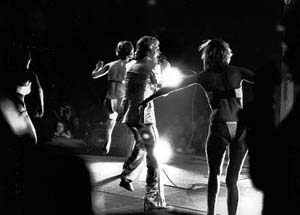
François on stage in 1976

François moved to Paris, where there were many more opportunities to pursue his career. At the time, American rock and roll was taking hold in France and he took a job as part of a singing group to make a living. With the goal of eventually making it as a solo act, he paid the cost to record a 45rpm. Trying to capitalise on the American dance craze "The Twist", he recorded a song titled "Nabout Twist" that proved a resounding failure. Undaunted, in 1962 he recorded a cover version in French of an Everly Brothers song, "Made to Love", also known as "Girls, Girls, Girls", under the name "Belles! Belles! Belles!".

François in 1965 in Toulouse

François' career continued to blossom under a new manager. In 1963 he followed the first success with another French adaptation of an American song, this time recording "If I Had a Hammer" and "Walk Right In" in French as "Si j'avais un marteau" and "Marche Tout Droit" respectively. François met Michel Bourdais who was working for the French magazine Salut les Copains ("Hi Buddies") and he asked him to draw his portrait.

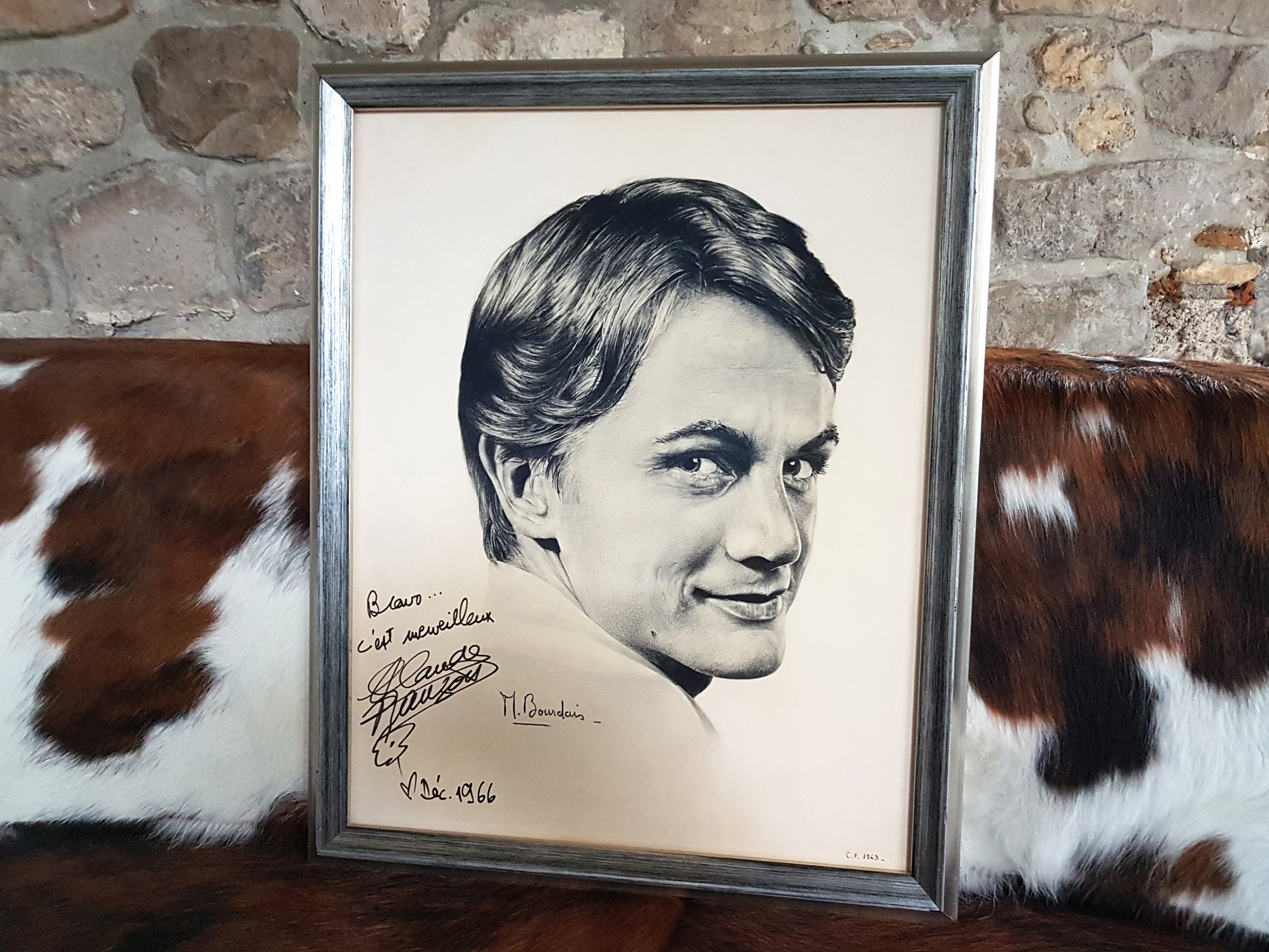
At the mill of Dannemois, the portrait of François, drawn in 1963 by Michel Bourdais at his request.

On 5 April 1963, he headlined at the Paris Olympia, a sign that he had arrived. In 1964, he dated 17-year-old Eurovision-winning singer, France Gall. At the end of that year, François created original new dance steps, and Bourdais drew them. For the first time, they brought up the idea of setting up a show with female dancers.

In 1967, he and Jacques Revaux wrote and composed a song in French called "Comme d'habitude" ("As Usual"), which became a hit in Francophone countries. Canadian singer Paul Anka later wrote English lyrics for the song, to create "My Way". François sang the original version of "Parce que je t'aime, mon enfant" ("Because I Love You My Child") in 1971; it remained relatively little-known in France but Elvis Presley covered it under the title "My Boy".

Although François continued his successful formula of adapting English and American rock and roll hits for the French market, by the 1970s the market had changed and the disco craze that swept North America took root in France. François adapted to the new trend, recording "La plus belle chose du monde", a French version of the Bee Gees' hit record, "Massachusetts".

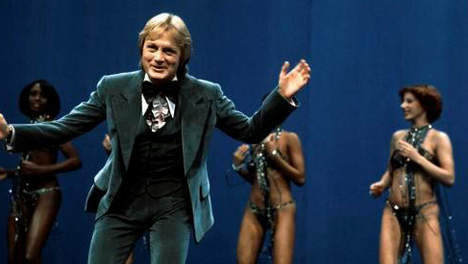
François performing in 1976

Looking for new talent, he came across a singing family of two sisters and their cousins. These women became known as "Les Flêchettes" (named after "Flèche", the production label he owned) and then "Les Clodettes". He produced a couple of albums for them before his death, and they went on to sing for some of the major stars in European music. He worked non-stop, touring across Europe, Africa and at major venues in Quebec in Canada.

However, in 1971, his workload caught up with him when he collapsed on stage from exhaustion. After a brief period off, he returned to the recording studios, releasing several best-selling hits throughout the early 1970s. He expanded from owning his own record company to acquiring a celebrity magazine and a modelling agency.

== Philanthropy ==
Although driven to achieve financial success, in 1974 he organised a concert to raise funds for a charity for handicapped children, and the following year he participated in a Paris concert to raise funds for medical research.

== Personal life ==
In November 1960, he married French-British dancer Janet Woollacott. She left him in 1962, and he was finally divorced from her in 1967. This failed marriage was one of the three big traumas that affected his whole life. The relationship with France Gall ended in July 1967. After this, François had an affair with singer Annie Phillippe, who reportedly refused to marry him.

François soon got consolation when he arranged a date with model Isabelle Forêt, whom he had first met a few years before. Their relationship lasted from 1967 to 1972 and produced two sons, Claude Jr. in July 1968 and Marc in November 1969. He hid the existence from the public of his second son for five years because he thought that being a father of two would destroy his boyish image as "a free man and seducer". His loyal fans knew and had photos taken with him but kept it a secret.

By 1972 he was single again, dating several well-known European stars. Finnish model Sofia Kiukkonen 1973–76 and American model Kathalyn (Kathleen) H. Jones-Mann 1976–78 were his most important relationships of this period. He also had an affair with his dresser Sylvie Mathurin from 1974 to 1978.

He continued to perform while overseeing his numerous business interests. In 1975, while in London, he narrowly escaped death when an IRA bomb exploded in the lobby of the Hilton hotel and two years later a fan tried to shoot him while he drove his car.

=== International career ===
He performed an international career mostly in Belgium and Switzerland, but also in Italy, Spain, England and Canada. In 1976, his song "Le téléphone pleure" ("Tears on the Telephone") reached No. 35 in the UK Singles Chart. On 16 January 1978, he performed, for the first time for a French singer, a gala at the Royal Albert Hall in London to an audience of 6000.

== Death ==
After recording a television special at Leysin for the BBC on 10 March 1978, François returned to his Paris apartment at 46 Boulevard Exelmans. He was due to appear on Les Rendez-vous du Dimanche with Michel Drucker. While preparing for a bath, François attempted to straighten a lightbulb in his bathroom lamp, causing him to receive a severe electric shock, which triggered pulmonary edema. He died in his apartment.

His body was buried in the village of Dannemois, in the Essonne department (about 55 km (34 mi) south of Paris), near which François owned a house where he spent his weekends.

== Legacy ==
On 11 March 2000, the 22nd anniversary of his death, Place Claude-François in Paris was named in his memory; it is located in front of the building where he died.

The 2003 jukebox musical Belles belles belles is based on François' songs.

A biographical film called Cloclo (My Way internationally) was released in March 2012 to coincide with the anniversary of his death. It runs two and a half hours long and stars Jérémie Renier.

François' sons, Claude Jr and Marc, have assumed the management of their father's artistic heritage over the years.

== Controversies ==
A woman named Julie Bocquet maintains that François is her father. Fabienne, her mother, was 15 when she got pregnant. She lied about her age to him and said she was a lot older.

== Discography ==
=== Studio albums ===
- Dis-lui (1963)
- Si j'avais un marteau (1963)
- N° 3 (1964)
- N° 3 (1965)
- N° 4 (1965)
- N° 5 (1966)
- Comme d'habitude (1967)
- Éloïse (1968)
- Un monde de musique (1969)
- Menteur ou cruel (1969)
- Le monde extraordinaire de Claude François (1970)
- Claude François (1970)
- C'est la même chanson (1971)
- Il fait beau, il fait bon (1971)
- Claude François (1972)
- Le lundi au soleil (1972)
- Je viens diner ce soir (1973)
- Chanson populaire (1973)
- Le mal aimé (1974)
- Toi et moi contre le monde entier (1975)
- Pourquoi pleurer (sur un succès d'été) (1975)
- Pour les jeunes de 8 à 88 ans (1976)
- Claude François (1976)
- C'est comme ça que l'on s'est aimé (1977)
- Magnolias for Ever (1977)

=== Foreign-language studio albums ===
- Claude e les Clodettes (1969; in Italian)
- Claude François en Anglais (1977; in English)
