= Pat Boone discography =

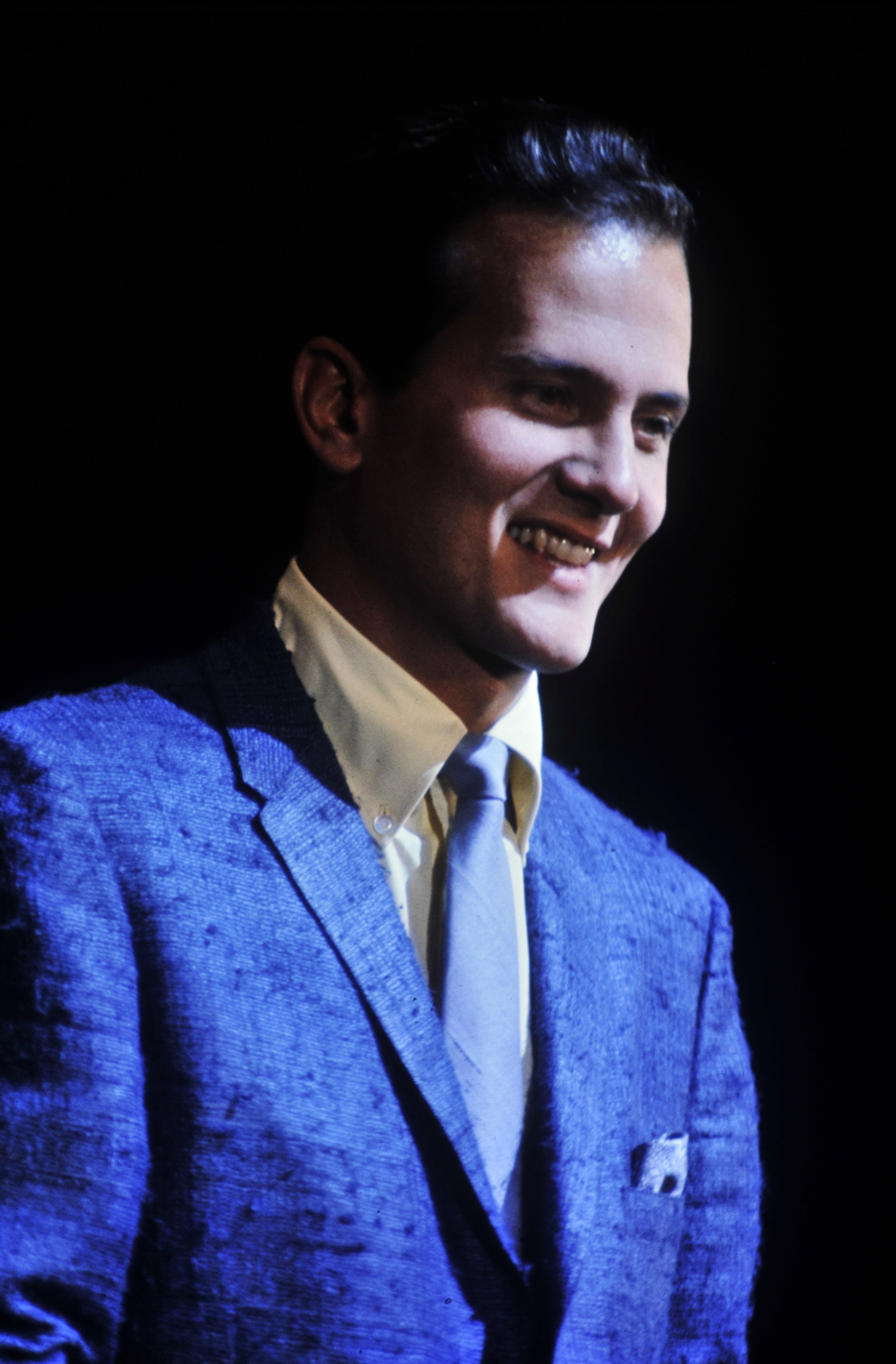
- Studio albums: 78
- Soundtrack albums: 3
- Compilation albums: 78
- Singles: 63
- Video albums: 5

During his career as a singer and composer, Pat Boone released 63 singles in the United States, mostly during the 1950s and early 1960s when Boone was a successful pop singer and, for a time, the second-biggest charting artist behind Elvis Presley according to Billboard. Boone has had over 25 singles reach the top 20 on the U.S. singles charts, including the number-one hits "Ain't That a Shame" (1955), "I Almost Lost My Mind" (1956), "Don't Forbid Me" (1957), "Love Letters in the Sand" (1957), "April Love" (1957), and "Moody River" (1961). "I'll Be Home" (1956) reached No. 1 in the UK. He set a Billboard record, which he still holds, for spending 220 consecutive weeks on the charts with one or more songs each week.

Boone also had several top 20 albums during this time, including the EP Four by Pat (1957) which peaked at No. 5 on the U.S. album charts, and his highest-charting album, Star Dust (1958), which reached No. 2. He also released two hit soundtracks for musical films in which he starred, April Love (1957) and State Fair (1962). Most of his records during the 1950s and 1960s were released on the Dot Records label.

In 1967, Boone recorded several spoken word essays, which were released on record, along with selections from other narrators, by an organization called the Family Achievement Institute.

Boone had a single release in 2024 entitled "My Stupid Tattoo”, and he has continued to release both studio albums and compilation albums regularly for six decades, in addition to several soundtracks and video albums. His post-1960s output has been on a variety of different labels, and has increasingly focused on Christian music. A notable exception was his controversial 1997 album In a Metal Mood: No More Mr. Nice Guy, which featured Boone covering well-known hard rock and heavy metal songs such as "Stairway to Heaven", "Smoke on the Water" and "Crazy Train" in a jazz/ big band style. It reached No. 125 on the U.S. Billboard 200 album chart, thus becoming Boone's first album to chart in 35 years.

== Albums ==
=== Studio albums ===
List of studio albums, with selected chart positions, sales and certifications
Year	Title	Album details	Peak chart positions		
Year	Title	Album details	US Billboard	US Cashbox	UK OCC
1956	Pat Boone	Released: Label: Dot Records (DLP 3012)	20	—	—
1956	Howdy!	Released: Label: Dot Records (DLP 3030)	14	12	—
1957	"Pat"	Released: Label: Dot Records (DLP 3050)	19	15	—
1957	Hymns We Love	Released: Label: Dot Records (DLP 3068)	21	—	12 (Note: The album charted two times in 1960 in the UK, reaching No. 14 the first time and No. 12 the second time it appeared on the chart.)
1957	Pat Boone Sings Irving Berlin	Released: December 1957; Label: Dot Records (DLP 3077)	—	—	—
1958	Star Dust	Released: Label: Dot Records (DLP 3118, 25118)	2	—	10
1958	Yes Indeed!	Released: Label: Dot Records (DLP 3121, 25121)	13	—	—
1959	Tenderly	Released: Label: Dot Records (DLP 3180, 25180)	17	22	—
1959	Side by Side (with Shirley Boone)	Released: Label: Dot Records (DLP 3199, 25199)	—	—	—
1959	He Leadeth Me	Released: Label: Dot Records (DLP 3234, 25234)	—	—	—
1959	White Christmas	Released: Label: Dot Records (DLP 3222, 25222)	39	—	—
1960	Moonglow	Released: Label: Dot Records (DLP 3270, 25270)	26	44	—
1960	This and That	Released: Label: Dot Records (DLP 3285, 25285)	—	—	—
1960	Great! Great! Great!	Released: Label: Dot Records (DLP 3346, 25346)	—	—	—
1961	Moody River	Released: Label: Dot Records (DLP 3384, 25384)	29	18	—
1961	My God and I	Released: Label: Dot Records (DLP 3386, 25386)	—	—	—
1962	I'll See You in My Dreams	Released: Label: Dot Records (DLP 3399, 25399)	—	—	—
1962	Pat Boone Reads from the Holy Bible	Released: Label: Dot Records (DLP 3402)	—	—	—
1962	I Love You Truly (with Shirley Boone)	Released: Label: Dot Records (DLP 3475, 25475)	—	—	—
1963	Pat Boone Sings Guess Who?	Released: Label: Dot Records (DLP 3501, 25501)	—	—	—
1963	Pat Boone Sings Days of Wine and Roses and Other Movie Themes	Released: Label: Dot Records (DLP 3504, 25504)	—	—	—
1963	The Star Spangled Banner	Released: Label: Dot Records (DLP 3520, 25520)	—	—	—
1963	Tie Me Kangaroo Down Sport	Released: Label: Dot Records (DLP 3534, 25534)	—	—	—
1964	Sing Along Without Pat Boone!	Released: Label: Dot Records (DLP 3513, 25513)	—	—	—
1964	The Touch of Your Lips	Released: Label: Dot Records (DLP 3546, 25546)	—	—	—
1964	Ain't That a Shame	Released: Label: Dot Records (DLP 3573, 25573)	—	—	—
1964	The Lord's Prayer and Other Great Hymns	Released: Label: Dot Records (DLP 3582, 25582)	—	—	—
1964	Boss Beat!	Released: Label: Dot Records	—	—	—
1964	Near You	Released: Label: Dot Records	—	—	—
1965	Blest Be the Tie That Binds	Released: Label: Dot Records	—	—	—
1965	The Golden Era of Country Hits	Released: Label: Dot Records (DLP 3626, 25626)	—	—	—
1965	My 10th Anniversary with Dot Records	Released: Label: Dot Records (DLP 3650, 25650)	—	—	—
1965	Pat Boone Sings Winners of the Reader's Digest Poll	Released: Label: Dot Records (DLP 3667, 25667)	—	—	—
1966	Great Hits of 1965	Released: Label: Dot Records (DLP 3685, 25685)	—	—	—
1966	Memories	Released: Label: Dot Records (DLP 25748)	—	—	—
1966	Wish You Were Here, Buddy	Released: Label: Dot Records (DLP 3764, 25764)	—	—	—
1966	Christmas Is A Comin'	Released: Label: Dot Records (DLP 3770, 25770)	—	—	—
1967	How Great Thou Art	Released: Label: Dot Records	—	—	—
1967	I Was Kaiser Bill's Batman with Pat Boone Whistling Plus Nine Vocal Performances	Released: Label: Dot Records (DLP 3805, 25805)	—	—	—
1968	Look Ahead	Released: Label: Dot Records (DLP 3876, 25876)	—	—	—
1969	Departure	Released: Label: Tetragrammaton Records (T-118)	—	—	—
1970	Songs for Jesus Folk	Released: Label: Supreme	—	—	—
1972	In the Holy Land	Released: Label: Lamb & Lion Records	—	—	—
1972	The New Songs of the Jesus People	Released: Label: Lamb & Lion Records	—	—	—
1973	All in the Boone Family	Released: Label: Lamb & Lion	—	—	—
1973	Born Again	Released: Label: Lamb & Lion Records	—	—	—
1973	Family Who Prays	Released: Label: Lamb & Lion Records	—	—	—
1973	Pat Boone S-A-V-E-D	Released: Label: Lamb & Lion Records	—	—	—
1973	I Love You More and More Each Day	Released: Label: MGM Records	—	—	—
1973	Pat Boone with the First Nashville Jesus Band	Released: Label: Lamb & Lion Records	—	—	—
1973	Thank You Dear Lord	Released: Label: Lamb & Lion Records	—	—	—
1974	The Pat Boone Family	Released: Label: Word Records	—	—	—
1974	Songs from the Inner Court	Released: Label: Lamb & Lion Records	—	—	—
1975	Something Supernatural	Released: Label: Lamb & Lion Records	—	—	—
1976	Texas Woman	Released: Label: Hitsville / Motown	—	—	—
1977	The Country Side of Pat Boone	Released: Label: MC Records / Motown	—	—	—
1977	Miracle Merry-Go-Round	Released: Label: Lamb & Lion Records	—	—	—
1979	Just the Way I Am	Released: Label: Lamb & Lion Records	—	—	—
1981	Songmaker	Released: Label: Lamb & Lion Records	—	—	—
1982	A Pocketful of Hope	Released: Label: Thistle Records	—	—	—
1984	Pat Boone Sings Golden Hymns	Released: Label: Lamb & Lion Records	—	—	—
1994	I Remember Red: A Tribute to Red Foley	Released: November 10, 1994; Label: Delta Records; Format: CD	—	—	—
1994	The Pat Boone Family Christmas	Released: Label: Delta; Format: Cassette, CD	—	—	—
1997	In a Metal Mood: No More Mr. Nice Guy	Released: January 28, 1997; Label: Hip-O Records	125	—	—
1999	Echoes of Mercy	Released: Label: Word	—	—	—
2000	The Miracle of Christmas	Released: Label: Delta	—	—	—
2002	American Glory	Released: Label: The Gold Label	—	—	—
2005	Nearer My God to Thee	Released: Label: Curb Records	—	—	—
2005	Glory Train: The Lost Sessions	Released: Label: The Gold Label	—	—	—
2005	Dream of Ireland	Released: Label: The Gold Label	—	—	—
2006	Hopeless Romantic	Released: February 7, 2006; Label: The Gold Label	—	—	—
2006	We Are Family: R&B Classics	Released: September 19, 2006; Label: The Gold Label; Format: CD	86	—	—
2006	Ready to Rock	Released: Label: The Gold Label; Format: CD	—	—	—
2006	In A Symphonic Mood	Released: Label: The Gold Label; Format: CD	—	—	—
2007	The True Spirit of Christmas	Released: Label: The Gold Label; Format: CD	—	—	—
2010	Near	Released: Label: The Gold Label; Format: CD	—	—	—
2014	Legacy	Released: Label: The Gold Label; Format: CD	—	—	—
2015	Pat Boone's Favourite Bible Stories & Sing-Along Songs	Released: Label: Lamb & Lion Records; Format: CD	—	—	—

=== EPs ===
List of selected EPs, with chart positions
Year	Title	Album details	Peak chart positions
Year	Title	Album details	US BB
1957	A Closer Walk with Thee	Released: Label: Dot Records (DEP 1056)	13
1957	Four by Pat	Released: Label: Dot Records (DEP 1057)	5

=== Soundtracks ===
Year	Title	Album details	Peak chart positions
Year	Title	Album details	US BB
1957	April Love	Released: Label: Dot Records	12
1962	State Fair	Released: Label: 20th Fox Records	12
1972	Come Together: A Musical Experience in Love	Released: Label: Light Records	—

=== Compilations ===
List of compilation albums, with selected chart positions
Year	Title	Album details	Peak chart positions			Certifications
Year	Title	Album details	US BB	US CB	UK OCC	Certifications
1957	Pat's Great Hits	Released: Label: Dot Records (DLP 3071)	3	2	—	RIAA Gold
1959	Pat Boone Sings	Released: Label: Dot Records (DLP 3158, 25158)	—	19	—	
1960	Pat's Great Hits, Vol. 2	Released: Label: Dot Records (DLP 3158, DLP 25158)	—	—	—	
1962	Pat Boone's Golden Hits; Featuring Speedy Gonzales	Released: Label: Dot Records (DLP 3455, 25455)	66	—	—	
1967	Golden Hits – 15 Hits of Pat Boone	Released: Label: Dot Records (DLP 25814)	—	—	—	
1976	Pat Boone Originals	Released: Label: ABC (ABSD301)	—	—	16	
1993	Pat Boone's Greatest Hits	Released: Label: MCA Records (MCAD 10885); Format: CD	—	—	—	

=== Other ===
- 1964: The Gold Collection (The Gold Label)
- 1982: Best of Pat Boone (Prism Platinum)
- 1982: The Best of Pat Boone (MCA)
- 1986: Jivin' Pat (Bear Family)
- 1986: All the Hits (Topline)
- 1987: Love Letters (Dominion)
- 1990: Greatest Hits (Curb)
- 1990: The Best of Pat Boone: April Love (Delta)
- 1993: Love Letters in the Sand (Delta)
- 1994: Pat Boone (Bellaphon)
- 1994: More Greatest Hits (Varèse Sarabande)
- 1994: Remember (Eclipse)
- 1995: Greatest Hits (Bellaphon)
- 1995: Greatest Hymns (Curb)
- 1995: His Greatest Hits (Laserlight)
- 1996: The Best of Pat Boone (Hallmark)
- 1997: Pat Boone (Members Edition)
- 1997: Fifties: Complete (Bear Family)
- 1997: EP Collection (See For Miles Records)
- 1998: My God is Real: The Inspirational Collection (Varese)
- 1998: The Best of Pat Boone (Music Club)
- 1999: Hymns We Love (Universal Special Products)
- 1999: Golden Treasury of Hymns (The Gold Label)
- 1999: My Greatest Songs (IMS)
- 2000: Love Letters in the Sand (Hallmark)
- 2000: At His Best: Love Letters in the Sand (Castle Music)
- 2000: I Believe In Music (Acrobat)
- 2000: The Very Best of Pat Boone (Big Eye Music)
- 2000: 20th Century Masters - The Millennium Collection: The Best of Pat Boone (MCA)
- 2000: Best of the Best (Legacy)
- 2001: Blast from the Past: Pat Boone (Direct Source)
- 2001: Greatest Hits & Favorite Hymns (Goldies)
- 2001: Pat's 40 Big Ones (Connoisseur)
- 2002: On the Sentimental Side (MRA)
- 2002: Best Selection (Universal)
- 2002: Pat Boone Best Selection (Universal)
- 2002: The Ultimate Collection (Universal)
- 2003: Ultimate Legends: Pat Boone (Ultimate Entertainment)
- 2003: The Singles+ (BR Music)
- 2003: Pat Boone (Weton)
- 2004: Greatest Contemporary Christian Songs (Curb)
- 2004: Greatest Love Songs (Curb)
- 2004: Greatest Rock N' Roll Songs (Curb)
- 2004: Greatest Hits (Elap)
- 2004: Christmas with Pat Boone (Noel)
- 2004: I'll Be Home for Christmas (Christmas Legends)
- 2005: Remember You're Mine (Brentwood Records)
- 2005: Platinum Collection (Platinum Entertainment)
- 2006: Best of Pat Boone (Platinum Disc)
- 2006: The Sixties (1960–1962) (Bear Family)
- 2006: Kid in the White Buckskin Shoes! (Canetoad International)
- 2007: Encore of Golden Hits (Musicpro)
- 2008: Gee Whittakers (Xtra)
- 2008: Sweet Hour of Prayer (Remember Records)
- 2008: Rock N Roll Legends (RNR Music)
- 2008: Ain't That a Shame (Hallmark)
- 2008: Pat's Great Hits (Hallmark)
- 2008: Pledging My Love (Hallmark)
- 2009: Pat Boone Rocks (Bear Family)
- 2009: My God Is Real (Delta Leisure Group)
- 2009: Spotlight on Pat Boone (Mbop Direct-Zone 5)
- 2010: Christmas Songs
- 2015: Duets
- 2017: Greatest Hits
- 2019: Greatest Hits Live
- 2019: Old-Fashioned Christmas
- 2020: I’ll Be Home for Christmas: The Lost 1958 Christmas Album
- 2020 Anthology: The Definitive Collection (Remastered)
- 2020: The Gold Collection (Deluxe Version with Commentary)
- 2023: Country Jubilee

== Singles ==
Year	Titles (A-side, B-side) Both sides from same album except where indicated	Peak chart positions							Album
Year	Titles (A-side, B-side) Both sides from same album except where indicated	US	US CB	US AC	US COU	UK	US R&B	DE	Album
1953	"Until You Tell Me So" b/w "My Heart Belongs to You"	—	—	—	—	—	—	—	Non-album tracks
1954	"I Need Someone" b/w "Loving You Madly"	—	—	—	—	—	—	—	Non-album tracks
1955	"Two Hearts" b/w "Tra-La-La"	16	—	—	—	—	—	—	Pat Boone
1955	"Ain't That a Shame" b/w "Tennessee Saturday Night"	1	1	—	—	7	14	—	Pat Boone
1955	"At My Front Door (Crazy Little Mama)" /	7	8	—	—	—	12	—	Pat Boone
1955	"No Arms Can Ever Hold You"	26	—	—	—	—	—	—	Pat Boone
1955	"Gee Whittakers!" b/w "Take the Time"	19	—	—	—	—	—	—	Pat Boone
1956	"I'll Be Home" /	4	5	—	—	1	—	—	Pat Boone
1956	"Tutti Frutti"	12	—	—	—	—	—	5	Pat Boone
1956	"Just as Long as I'm with You" /	76	—	—	—	—	—	—	Non-album tracks
1956	"Long Tall Sally"	8	—	—	—	18	—	—	Non-album tracks
1956	"I Almost Lost My Mind" /	1	2	—	—	14	—	—	Pat's Great Hits
1956	"I'm in Love with You"	57	—	—	—	—	—	—	Pat's Great Hits
1956	"Friendly Persuasion" /	5	10	—	—	3	—	—	Pat's Great Hits
1956	"Chains of Love"	10	16	—	—	—	—	—	Pat's Great Hits
1956	"Don't Forbid Me" /	1	3	—	—	—	2	10	Pat's Great Hits
1956	"Anastasia"	37	25	—	—	—	—	—	Pat's Great Hits
1957	"Why Baby Why" /	5	9	—	—	17	—	—	Pat's Great Hits
1957	"I'm Waiting Just for You"	27	24	—	—	—	—	—	Pat's Great Hits
1957	"Love Letters in the Sand" /	1	1	—	—	2	12	12	Pat's Great Hits
1957	"Bernardine"	14	20	—	—	—	—	—	Pat's Great Hits
1957	"Remember You're Mine" /	6	10	—	—	5	—	—	Pat's Great Hits
1957	"There's a Gold Mine in the Sky"	14	15	—	—	—	—	—	Pat's Great Hits
1957	"April Love" /	1	3	—	—	7	—	—	Pat Boone Sings
1957	"When the Swallows Come Back to Capistrano"	80	50	—	—	—	—	—	Pat Boone Sings
1958	"A Wonderful Time Up There" /	4	6	—	—	2	—	—	Pat Boone Sings
1958	"It's Too Soon to Know"	4	6	—	—	7	—	—	Pat Boone Sings
1958	"Sugar Moon" /	5	9	—	—	6	—	—	Pat Boone Sings
1958	"Cherie, I Love You"	63	41	—	—	—	—	—	Pat Boone Sings
1958	"If Dreams Came True" /	7	11	—	—	16	—	—	Pat Boone Sings
1958	"That's How Much I Love You"	39	61	—	—	—	—	—	Pat Boone Sings
1958	"For My Good Fortune" /	23	44	—	—	—	—	—	Pat Boone Sings
1958	"Gee, But It's Lonely"	21	25	—	—	30	—	—	Pat Boone Sings
1958	"I'll Remember Tonight" b/w "The Mardi Gras March"	34	33	—	—	18	—	—	Pat Boone Sings
1959	"With the Wind and the Rain in Your Hair" /	21	17	—	—	21	—	—	Pat Boone's Golden Hits
1959	"Good Rockin' Tonight"	49	58	—	—	—	—	—	Non-album track
1959	"For a Penny" /	23	21	—	—	19	—	—	Pat Boone's Golden Hits
1959	"The Wang Dang Taffy-Apple Tango"	62	61	—	—	—	—	—	Pat Boone's Golden Hits
1959	"'Twixt Twelve and Twenty" b/w "Rock Boll Weevil" (Non-album track)	17	23	—	—	18	—	—	Pat Boone's Golden Hits
1959	"Fools Hall of Fame" b/w "Brightest Wishing Star"	29	25	—	—	—	—	—	Non-album tracks
1959	"Beyond the Sunset" b/w "My Faithful Heart" (Non-album track)	71	51	—	—	—	—	—	Hymns We Love
1960	"(Welcome) New Lovers" /	18	23	—	—	—	—	—	Pat Boone's Golden Hits
1960	"Words"	94	—	—	—	—	—	—	Pat Boone's Golden Hits
1960	"Walking the Floor over You" /	44	36	—	—	39	—	—	Pat Boone's Golden Hits
1960	"Spring Rain”	50	49	—	—	—	—	—	Non-album tracks
1960	"Candy Sweet" /	72	60	—	—	—	—	—	Non-album tracks
1960	"Delia Gone"	66	86	—	—	—	—	—	Pat Boone - 1965
1960	"Dear John" /	44	60	—	—	—	—	—	Pat Boone's Golden Hits
1960	"Alabam"	47	70	—	—	—	—	—	Pat Boone's Golden Hits
1960	"The Exodus Song (This Land Is Mine)" b/w "There's a Moon Out Tonight"	64	71	—	—	—	—	—	Days of Wine and Roses
1961	"Moody River" b/w "A Thousand Years"	1	2	4	—	18	—	—	Moody River
1961	"Big Cold Wind" b/w "That's My Desire" (Non-album track)	19	28	5	—	—	—	—	Pat Boone's Golden Hits
1961	"Johnny Will" /	35	36	10	—	4	—	25	Pat Boone's Golden Hits
1961	"Just Let Me Dream"	114	—	—	—	—	—	—	Non-album track
1961	"Pictures in the Fire" /	77	63	15	—	—	—	—	I'll See You in My Dreams
1961	"I'll See You in My Dreams"	32	35	9	—	27	—	—	I'll See You in My Dreams
1962	"Quando Quando Quando" /	95	—	—	—	41	—	—	Non-album tracks
1962	"Willing and Eager"	113	89	—	—	—	—	—	Non-album tracks
1962	"Speedy Gonzales" b/w "The Locket" (Non-album track)	6	6	—	—	2	—	1	Pat Boone's Golden Hits
1962	"Ten Lonely Guys" /	45	58	14	—	—	—	—	Non-album tracks
1962	"Lover's Lane"	—	—	—	—	—	—	11	Non-album tracks
1962	"The Main Attraction" b/w "Always You and Me"	—	—	—	—	12	—	—	Non-album tracks
1962	"White Christmas" b/w "Silent Night"	—	—	—	—	29	—	—	White Christmas
1962	"Mexican Joe" b/w "In the Room" (from Ain't That a Shame)	—	—	—	—	—	—	—	Non-album tracks
1963	"Meditation (Meditação)" /	91	70	—	—	—	—	—	Non-album track
1963	"The Days of Wine and Roses"	117	—	—	—	—	—	—	Days of Wine and Roses
1963	"Tie Me Kangaroo Down Sport" b/w "I Feel Like Crying"	—	—	—	—	—	—	—	Tie Me Kangaroo Down Sport
1963	"Mister Moon" b/w "Love Me" (Pat Boone Sings Guess Who?)	—	—	—	—	—	—	—	Ain't That a Shame
1963	"Some Enchanted Evening" b/w "That's Me"	—	—	—	—	—	—	—	Non-album tracks
1964	"Rosemarie" b/w "I Understand (Just How You Feel)"	129	—	—	—	—	—	—	Non-album tracks
1964	"Don't You Just Know It" b/w "Sincerely"	—	—	—	—	—	—	—	Non-album tracks
1964	"Beach Girl" /	72	88	—	—	—	—	—	Non-album tracks
1964	"Little Honda"	—	—	—	—	—	—	47	Non-album tracks
1965	"Baby Elephant Walk" b/w "Say Goodbye"	—	—	—	—	—	—	—	Pat Boone - 1965
1965	"Crazy Arms" b/w "Pearly Shells" (from My 10th Anniversary with Dot Records)	—	—	—	—	—	—	—	The Golden Era of Country Hits
1965	"Time Marches On" b/w "Mickey Mouse"	—	—	—	—	—	—	—	Non-album tracks
1965	"I Love You So Much It Hurts" b/w "Meet Me Tonight in Dreamland"	—	—	—	—	—	—	—	Memories
1965	"A Man Alone" b/w "Run to Me, Baby"	—	—	—	—	—	—	—	Non-album tracks
1966	"Five Miles from Home" b/w "Don't Put Your Feet in the Lemonade" (Non-album track)	127	—	—	—	—	—	—	Wish You Were Here, Buddy
1966	"As Tears Go By" b/w "Judith"	—	—	—	—	—	—	—	Great Hits of 1965
1966	"It Seems like Yesterday" b/w "A Well Remembered, Highly Thought of Love Affair" (from I Was Kaiser Bill's Batman)	—	—	—	—	—	—	—	Memories
1966	"Wish You Were Here, Buddy" b/w "Love for Love" (Non-album track)	49	51	12	—	—	—	—	Wish You Were Here, Buddy
1967	"Hurry Sundown" b/w "What If They Gave a War and No One Came" (from I Was Kaiser Bill's Batman)	—	—	—	—	—	—	—	Non-album tracks
1967	"Green Kentucky Hills of Home" b/w "You Mean All the World to Me"	—	—	—	—	—	—	—	Non-album tracks
1967	"In the Mirror of Your Mind" b/w "The Swanee Is a River"	—	—	—	—	—	—	—	Non-album tracks
1967	"Ride Ride Ride" b/w "By the Time I Get to Phoenix"	—	—	—	—	—	—	—	Non-album tracks
1968	"It's a Happening World" b/w "Emily"	—	—	—	—	—	—	—	Non-album tracks
1968	"Gonna Find Me a Bluebird" b/w "Deafening Roar of Silence"	—	—	—	—	—	—	—	Look Ahead
1968	"September Blue" b/w "Beyond Our Memory" (Non-album track)	—	—	33	—	—	—	—	You've Lost That Lovin' Feelin'
1969	"July You're a Woman" b/w "Break My Mind"	100	91	23	—	—	—	—	Departure
1969	"What's Gnawing at Me" b/w "Never Goin' Back"	—	—	—	—	—	—	—	Departure
1969	"Good Morning Dear" b/w "You Win Again"	—	—	—	—	—	—	—	Non-album tracks
1970	"Now I'm Saved" b/w "What Are You Doing for the Rest of Your Life"	—	—	—	—	—	—	—	Non-album tracks
1970	"Everybody's Looking For an Answer" b/w "I've Got Confidence"	—	—	—	—	—	—	—	Non-album tracks
1971	"C'mon Give a Hand" b/w "Where There's a Heartache"	—	—	—	—	—	—	—	Non-album tracks
1973	"The Sounds of Christmas" b/w "The Little Green Tree"	—	—	—	—	—	—	—	Non-album tracks
1973	"I Saw the Light" b/w "The Great Speckled Bird"	—	—	—	—	—	—	—	Non-album tracks
1973	"Tying the Pieces Together" b/w "Hayden Carter" (from I Love You More and More Every Day)	—	—	—	—	—	—	—	Non-album tracks
1973	"Golden Rocket" b/w "Everything Begins and Ends With You" (Non-album track)	—	—	—	—	—	—	—	I Love You More and More Every Day
1974	"Candy Lips" b/w "Young Girl"	—	—	—	—	—	—	—	Texas Woman
1975	"Indiana Girl" b/w "Young Girl"	—	—	36	72	—	—	—	Texas Woman
1975	"I'd Do It With You"	—	—	—	84	—	—	—	Texas Woman
1976	"Glory Train" b/w "U.F.O." (from Something Supernatural)	—	—	—	—	—	—	—	Non-album track
1976	"Texas Woman" b/w "It's Gone"	—	—	—	34	—	—	—	Texas Woman
1976	"Oklahoma Sunshine" b/w "Won't Be Home Tonight"	—	—	—	86	—	—	—	Texas Woman
1976	"Lovelight Comes a Shining" b/w "Country Days and Country Nights"	—	—	—	—	—	—	—	Texas Woman
1977	"Colorado Country Morning" b/w "Don't Want to Fall Away from You" (from Texas Woman)	—	—	—	60	—	—	—	The Country Side of Pat Boone
1977	"Whatever Happened to the Good Old Honky Tonk" b/w "Ain't Goin Down in the Ground Before My Time"	—	—	—	—	—	—	—	The Country Side of Pat Boone
1980	"Love's Got a Way of Hanging On" b/w "The Hostage Prayer"	—	—	—	—	—	—	—	Non-album tracks
1984	"Let Me Live" (Christian chart)	—	—	—	—	—	—	—	What I Believe
2025	"One: Voices For Tanzania" with Vince Gill, Alabama, Lee Greenwood, Larry Gatlin, Pam Tillis, Deborha Allen, Billy Dean, Wendy Moten, Due West, Aaron Goodvin, Mark209, David B. Hooten, Jet Jurgensmeyer, Legacy Mission, Village Singers & Sebastian Silas & God Is Love	—	—	26	—	—	—	—	Non-album track

Sources for chart positions: Billboard and All Music.Com

=== Non-US singles ===
Year	Titles (A-side, B-side)	Peak chart positions
Year	Titles (A-side, B-side)	DE
1964	"Memphis Tennessee" b/w "Kansas City"	1

==== German-language singles ====
Year	Titles (A-side, B-side)	Peak chart positions
Year	Titles (A-side, B-side)	DE
1962	"Baby, oh Baby (Don't Forbid Me)" b/w "Komm zu mir, wenn du einsam bist (Love Letters in the Sand)"	29
1963	"Rosmarie" b/w "Ein goldener Stern"	7
1964	"Baby Sonnenschein" b/w "Wie eine Lady"	25
1966	"Mary Lou" / "Nein, Nein, Nein, Valentina (Mai, Mai, Mai Valentina)"	—

==== Italian-language singles ====
Year	Titles (A-side, B-side)	Peak chart positions
Year	Titles (A-side, B-side)	IT
1966	"Mai, mai, mai Valentina" b/w "E fuori la pioggia cade"	—

== Videos ==
- 1995: Christmas with Pat Boone (Delta)
- 1995: 40 Years of Hits (Rhino)
- 2002: American Glory (The Gold Label)
- 2006: For My Country, Ballad of the National Guard (The Gold Label)
- 2006: Thank You, Billy Graham
