= List of UK top-ten singles in 1957 =

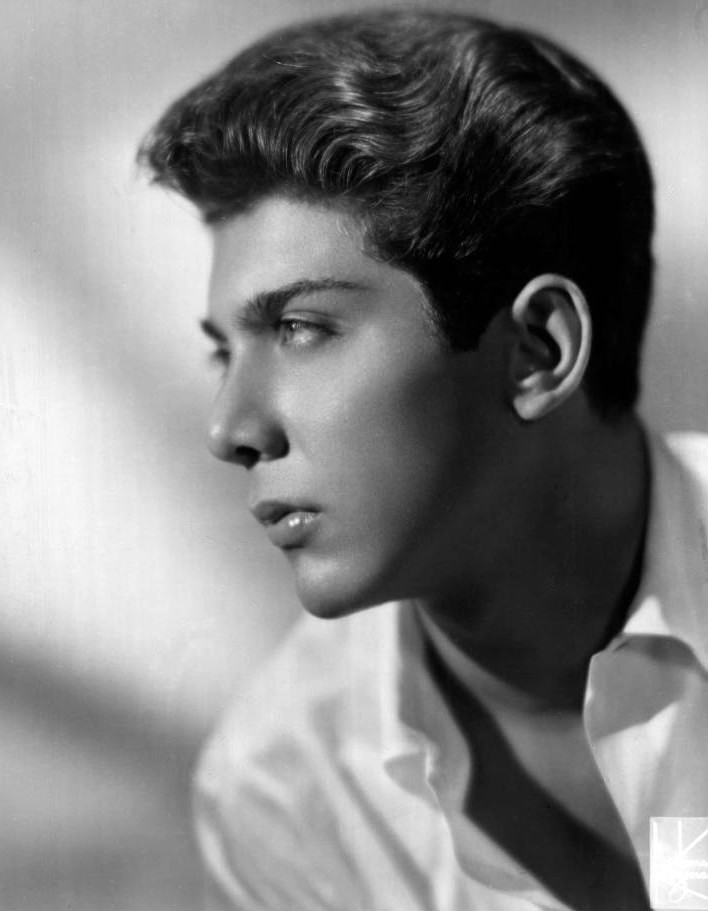
Paul Anka had the best-selling single of 1957 with "Diana", which topped the UK chart for nine weeks. "Diana" was the first UK chart entry for the then 16-year-old Canadian singer-songwriter. Anka had a second top 10 hit later in the year with "I Love You Baby", which peaked at number three.

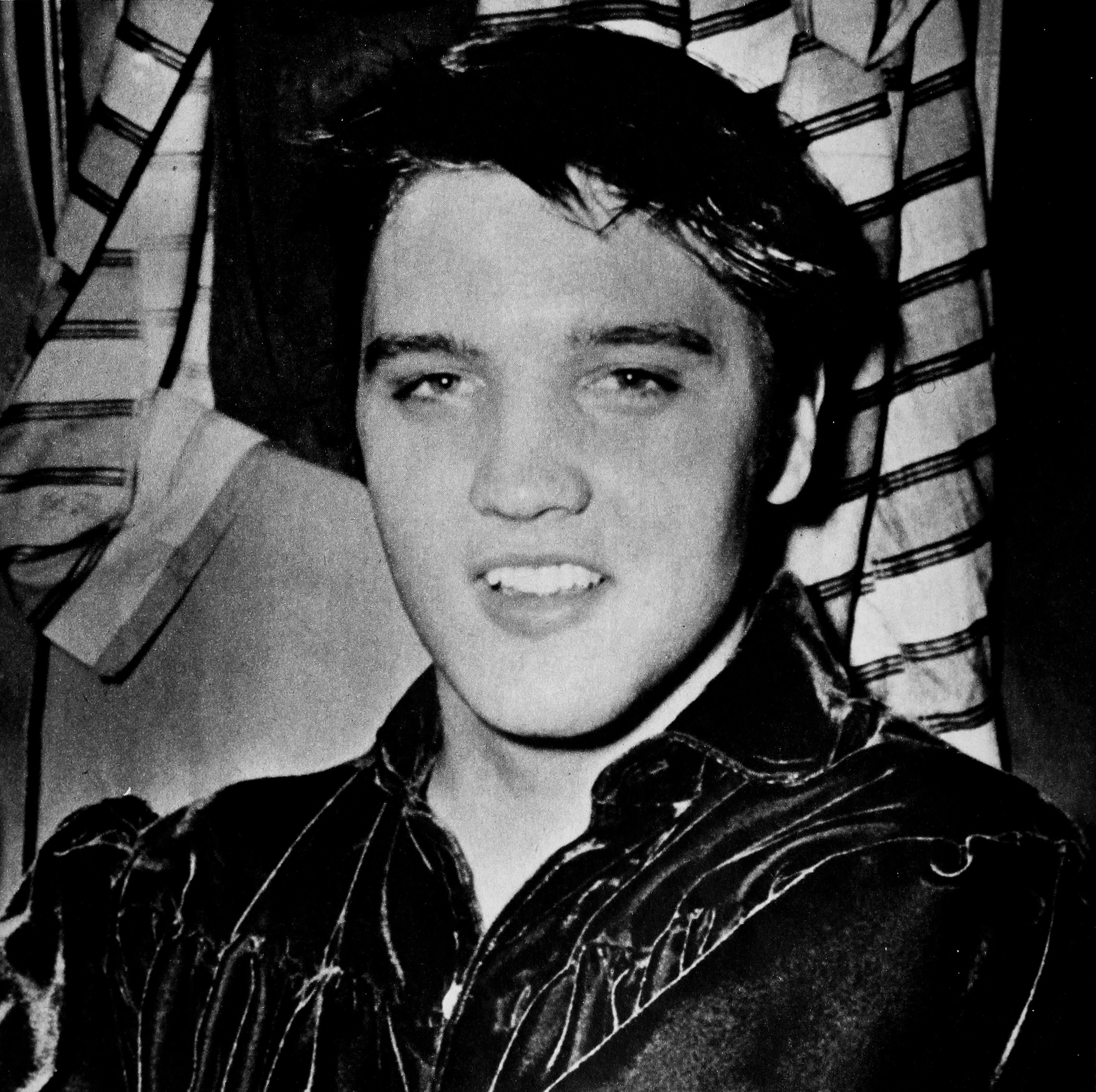
Elvis Presley scored his first UK number-one single this year with "All Shook Up", which spent seven weeks at the top of the chart. Presley had the most top 10 entries this year, with seven in total.

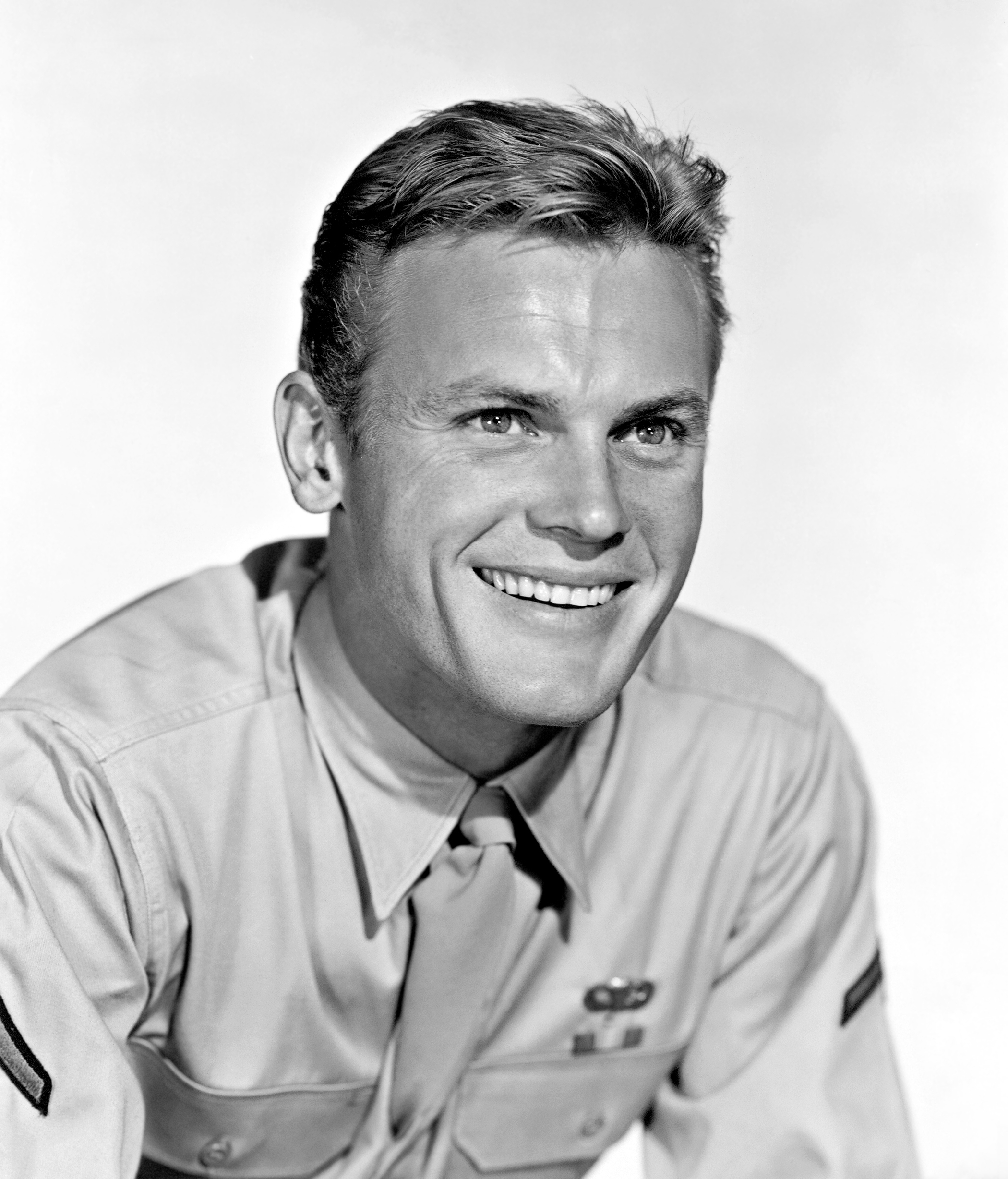
American singer and actor Tab Hunter achieved two top 10 entries in 1957, including "Young Love", which spent seven weeks at number-one.

The UK Singles Chart is one of many music charts compiled by the Official Charts Company that calculates the best-selling singles of the week in the United Kingdom. Before 2004, the chart was only based on the sales of physical singles. This list shows singles that peaked in the Top 10 of the UK Singles Chart during 1957, as well as singles which peaked in 1956 and 1958 but were in the top 10 in 1957. The entry date is when the single appeared in the top 10 for the first time (week ending, as published by the Official Charts Company, which is six days after the chart is announced).

Seventy-nine singles were in the top ten in 1957. Ten singles from 1956 remained in the top 10 for several weeks at the beginning of the year, while "All the Way"/"Chicago" by Frank Sinatra, "Great Balls of Fire" by Jerry Lee Lewis and "Reet Petite (The Sweetest Girl in Town)" by Jackie Wilson were all released in 1957 but did not reach their peak until 1958. "Singing the Blues" by Guy Mitchell and "True Love" by Bing Crosby & Grace Kelly were the singles from 1956 to reach their peak in 1957. Twenty artists scored multiple entries in the top 10 in 1957. Andy Williams, The Everly Brothers, Jerry Lee Lewis, Little Richard, Paul Anka and Shirley Bassey were among the many artists who achieved their first UK charting top 10 single in 1957.

The first new number-one single of the year was "Singing the Blues" by Guy Mitchell. Overall, thirteen different singles peaked at number-one in 1957, with Guy Mitchell and Lonnie Donegan (2) having the joint most singles hit that position.

== Background ==
=== Multiple entries ===
Eighty singles charted in the top 10 in 1957, with seventy-one singles reaching their peak this year. Six songs were recorded by several artists with each version reaching the top 10:

- "Around the World" – Bing Crosby, Gracie Fields, Ronnie Hilton
- "Cumberland Gap" – Lonnie Donegan, The Vipers Skiffle Group
- "Don't You Rock Me Daddy-O" – Lonnie Donegan, The Vipers Skiffle Group
- "Singing the Blues" – Guy Mitchell, Tommy Steele & the Steelmen
- "The Banana Boat Song" – Harry Belafonte, Shirley Bassey (version known as "The Banana Boat Song")
- "Wanderin' Eyes" – Charlie Gracie, Frankie Vaughan

Twenty artists scored multiple entries in the top 10 in 1957. Elvis Presley secured the record for most top 10 hits in 1957 with seven hit singles.

Paul Anka was one of a number of artists with two top-ten entries, including the number-one single "Diana". Bing Crosby, Malcolm Vaughan, Petula Clark, Tab Hunter and Winifred Atwell were among the other artists who had multiple top 10 entries in 1957.

=== Chart debuts ===
Twenty-seven artists achieved their first top 10 single in 1957, either as a lead or featured artist. Of these, five went on to record another hit single that year: Charlie Gracie, The Everly Brothers, Paul Anka, Tab Hunter and The Vipers Skiffle Group. Harry Belafonte, Little Richard and Tommy Steele and the Steelmen all had two other entries in their breakthrough year.

The following table (collapsed on desktop site) does not include acts who had previously charted as part of a group and secured their first top 10 solo single.

Artist	Number of top 10s	First entry	Chart position	Other entries
Tommy Steele	3	"Singing the Blues"	1	"Butterfingers" (8), "Water, Water"/"A Handful of Songs" (5)
Fats Domino	1	"Blueberry Hill"	6	—
The Vipers Skiffle Group	2	"Don't You Rock Me Daddy-O"	10	"Cumberland Gap" (10)
Tab Hunter	2	"Young Love"	1	"Ninety-Nine Ways" (5)
Little Richard	3	"Long Tall Sally"	3	"The Girl Can't Help It" (9), "Lucille" (10)
Harry Belafonte	3	"Day-O (The Banana Boat Song)"	2	"Island in the Sun" (3), "Mary's Boy Child" (1)
Shirley Bassey	1	"The Banana Boat Song"	8	—
Andy Williams	1	"Butterfly"	1	—
The Chas McDevitt Skiffle Group	1	"Freight Train"	5	—
Nancy Whiskey	1	"Freight Train"	5	—
Peggy Lee	1	"Mr. Wonderful"	5	—
Gracie Fields	1	"Around the World"	8	—
The Diamonds	1	"Little Darlin'"	3	—
Russ Hamilton	1	"We Will Make Love"	2	—
The King Brothers	1	"A White Sport Coat (and a Pink Carnation)"	6	—
The Everly Brothers	2	"Bye Bye Love"	6	"Wake Up Little Susie" (2)
Johnny Duncan and the Bluegrass Boys	1	"Last Train to San Fernando"	2	—
Paul Anka	2	"Diana"	1	"I Love You Baby" (3)
Charlie Gracie	2	"Fabulous"	8	"Wanderin' Eyes" (6)
Debbie Reynolds	1	"Tammy"	2	—
The Crickets	1	"That'll Be the Day"	1	—
Jerry Lee Lewis	2	"Whole Lotta Shakin' Goin' On"	8	"Great Balls of Fire" (1)
Jim Dale	1	"Be My Girl"	2	—
The Kaye Sisters	1	"Got-Ta Have Something in the Bank, Frank"	8	—
The Johnny Otis Show	1	"Ma! He's Making Eyes at Me"	2	—
Marie Adams	1	"Ma! He's Making Eyes at Me"	2	—
Jackie Wilson	1	"Reet Petite" ^{[A]}	6	—

=== Songs from films ===
Original songs from various films entered the top 10 throughout the year. These included "The Girl Can't Help It" (from The Girl Can't Help It), "When I Fall in Love" (Istanbul), "Around the World" (Around the World in 80 Days), "Love Letters in the Sand" (Bernardine), "Island in the Sun" (Island in the Sun), "Tammy" (Tammy and the Bachelor) and "All the Way" & "Chicago" (The Joker Is Wild).

Additionally, "Friendly Persuasion (Thee I Love)" by Pat Boone was a cover of the title track for the 1956 film Friendly Persuasion. The original version of the song was nominated for Best Original Song at the 29th Academy Awards. Gene Autry's recording of "Blueberry Hill" - released by Fats Domino this year - had appeared in the 1941 film The Singing Hill. "When I Fall in Love" was first introduced in the 1952 film One Minute to Zero, when Jeri Southern had been the vocalist. "I'll Take You Home Again, Kathleen" was used in several films before 1957, including For the Love of Mary (1948) and Rio Grande (1950), prior to Slim Whitman taking it into the UK top 10.

=== Best-selling singles ===
Until 1970 there was no universally recognised year-end best-sellers list. However, in 2011 the Official Charts Company released a list of the best-selling single of each year in chart history from 1952 to date. According to the list, "Diana" by Paul Anka is officially recorded as the biggest-selling single of 1957. "Diana" (2), "Mary's Boy Child" (3) "All Shook Up" (8) and "Love Letters in the Sand" (9) all ranked in the top 10 best-selling singles of the decade.

== Top-ten singles ==
Key

Symbol	Meaning
‡	Single peaked in 1956 but still in chart in 1957.
♦	Single released in 1957 but peaked in 1958.
(#)	Year-end best-selling single.
Entered	The date that the single first appeared in the chart.
Peak	Highest position that the single reached in the UK Singles Chart.

Entered (week ending)	Weeks in top 10	Single	Artist	Peak	Peak reached (week ending)	Weeks at peak
Singles in 1956
28 September 1956	17	"Hound Dog" ‡ ^{[B]}	Elvis Presley	2	26 October 1956	3
28 September 1956	14	"A Woman in Love" ‡ ^{[C]}	Frankie Laine	1	19 October 1956	4
26 October 1956	14	"Just Walkin' in the Rain" ‡	Johnnie Ray	1	16 November 1956	7
2 November 1956	9	"My Prayer" ‡	The Platters	4	9 November 1956	3
16 November 1956	9	"Rip It Up" ‡	Bill Haley & His Comets	4	7 December 1956	2
16 November 1956	12	"The Green Door" ‡	Frankie Vaughan	2	7 December 1956	3
16 November 1956	13	"St. Therese of the Roses" ‡	Malcolm Vaughan	3	14 December 1956	3
7 December 1956	19	"True Love"	Bing Crosby & Grace Kelly	4	8 February 1957	1
14 December 1956	17	"Singing the Blues"	Guy Mitchell	1	4 January 1957	3
14 December 1956	9	"Cindy, Oh Cindy" ‡	Eddie Fisher	5	21 December 1956	2
Singles in 1957
4 January 1957	6	"Singing the Blues"	Tommy Steele & the Steelmen	1	11 January 1957	1
11 January 1957	10	"Friendly Persuasion (Thee I Love)" ^{[D]}	Pat Boone	3	25 January 1957	3
18 January 1957	10	"The Garden of Eden" ^{[E]}	Frankie Vaughan	1	25 January 1957	4
25 January 1957	6	"Blueberry Hill"	Fats Domino	6	8 February 1957	1
1 February 1957	13	"Don't You Rock Me Daddy-O"	Lonnie Donegan	4	15 February 1957	1
8 February 1957	1	"Don't You Rock Me Daddy-O"	The Vipers Skiffle Group	10	8 February 1957	1
15 February 1957	13	"Young Love"	Tab Hunter	1	22 February 1957	7
15 February 1957	12	"Don't Forbid Me"	Pat Boone	2	8 March 1957	5
15 February 1957	2	"Don't Knock the Rock"	Bill Haley & His Comets	7	15 February 1957	1
21 February 1957	9	"Knee Deep in the Blues"	Guy Mitchell	3	8 March 1957	4
11 March 1957	1	"The Adoration Waltz"	David Whitfield	9	1 March 1957	1
8 March 1957	9	"Long Tall Sally"	Little Richard	3	29 March 1957	1
8 March 1957	11	"Day-O (The Banana Boat Song)"	Harry Belafonte	2	12 April 1957	3
15 March 1957	3	"The Banana Boat Song"	Shirley Bassey	8	29 March 1957	1
5 April 1957	9	"Cumberland Gap"	Lonnie Donegan	1	12 April 1957	5
5 April 1957	2	"The Girl Can't Help It"	Little Richard	9	12 April 1957	1
12 April 1957	4	"Look Homeward, Angel"	Johnnie Ray	7	19 April 1957	3
12 April 1957	1	"Cumberland Gap"	The Vipers Skiffle Group	10	12 April 1957	1
19 April 1957	6	"Baby, Baby"	Frankie Lymon & The Teenagers	4	3 May 1957	1
19 April 1957	7	"Ninety-Nine Ways"	Tab Hunter	5	3 May 1957	1
26 April 1957	12	"When I Fall in Love" ^{[F]}	Nat King Cole	2	14 June 1957	1
3 May 1957	7	"Rock-a-Billy"	Guy Mitchell	1	17 May 1957	1
3 May 1957	9	"Butterfly"	Andy Williams	1	24 May 1957	2
10 May 1957	7	"Freight Train"	The Chas McDevitt Skiffle Group featuring Nancy Whiskey	5	31 May 1957	1
10 May 1957	11	"Yes Tonight Josephine"	Johnnie Ray	1	7 June 1957	3
17 May 1957	3	"Too Much"	Elvis Presley	6	31 May 1957	1
24 May 1957	3	"I'll Take You Home Again, Kathleen"	Slim Whitman	7	24 May 1957	2
31 May 1957	5	"Mr. Wonderful" ^{[G]}	Peggy Lee	5	7 June 1957	1
7 June 1957	10	"Around the World"	Ronnie Hilton	4	5 July 1957	2
7 June 1957	3	"Around the World"	Gracie Fields	8	7 June 1957	1
7 June 1957	8	"Around the World" ^{[H]}	Bing Crosby	5	21 June 1957	1
14 June 1957	11	"Gamblin' Man"/"Puttin' On the Style"	Lonnie Donegan	1	28 June 1957	2
14 June 1957	10	"Little Darlin'"	The Diamonds	3	12 July 1957	2
28 June 1957	5	"A White Sport Coat (and a Pink Carnation)"	The King Brothers	6	28 June 1957	2
28 June 1957	16	"All Shook Up"	Elvis Presley	1	12 July 1957	7
28 June 1957	10	"We Will Make Love"	Russ Hamilton	2	2 August 1957	1
12 July 1957	4	"Butterfingers"	Tommy Steele & the Steelmen	8	19 July 1957	1
19 July 1957	9	"(Let Me Be Your) Teddy Bear" ^{[I]}	Elvis Presley	3	2 August 1957	2
26 July 1957	14	"Love Letters in the Sand" ^{[J]}	Pat Boone	2	16 August 1957	7
2 August 1957	14	"Island in the Sun"	Harry Belafonte	3	23 August 1957	1
2 August 1957	2	"Lucille"	Little Richard	10	2 August 1957	2
9 August 1957	6	"Bye Bye Love"	The Everly Brothers	6	30 August 1957	1
16 August 1957	10	"Last Train to San Fernando"	Johnny Duncan & the Blue Grass Boys	2	13 September 1957	2
23 August 1957	15	"Diana" (#1) ^{[J]}^{[K]}	Paul Anka	1	30 August 1957	9
23 August 1957	9	"With All My Heart"	Petula Clark	4	27 September 1957	1
30 August 1957	1	"Fabulous"	Charlie Gracie	8	30 August 1957	1
6 September 1957	7	"Water, Water"/"A Handful of Songs" ^{[L]}	Tommy Steele & the Steelmen	5	13 September 1957	2
6 September 1957	8	"Wanderin' Eyes"	Charlie Gracie	6	25 October 1957	1
13 September 1957	3	"Paralyzed"	Elvis Presley	8	13 September 1957	1
20 September 1957	11	"Tammy"	Debbie Reynolds	2	1 November 1957	1
4 October 1957	10	"That'll Be the Day"	The Crickets	1	1 November 1957	3
18 October 1957	9	"Party"	Elvis Presley	2	25 October 1957	4
18 October 1957	8	"Remember You're Mine"/"There's a Gold Mine in the Sky"	Pat Boone	5	25 October 1957	4
25 October 1957	3	"Whole Lotta Shakin' Goin' On"	Jerry Lee Lewis	8	1 November 1957	1
1 November 1957	3	"Man on Fire"/"Wanderin' Eyes"	Frankie Vaughan	6	1 November 1957	2
1 November 1957	8	"Be My Girl"	Jim Dale	2	29 November 1957	2
8 November 1957	4	"Got-Ta Have Something in the Bank, Frank"	Frankie Vaughan & The Kaye Sisters	8	8 November 1957	3
8 November 1957	1	"My Dixie Darling"	Lonnie Donegan	10	8 November 1957	1
15 November 1957	9	"Mary's Boy Child" ^{[M]}	Harry Belafonte	1	22 November 1957	7
15 November 1957	10	"I Love You Baby"	Paul Anka	3	13 December 1957	1
22 November 1957	8	"Wake Up Little Susie"	The Everly Brothers	2	13 December 1957	2
29 November 1957	11	"Ma! He's Making Eyes at Me"	Johnny Otis & His Orchestra with Marie Adams	2	20 December 1957	5
6 December 1957	9	"My Special Angel"	Malcolm Vaughan	3	27 December 1957	2
6 December 1957	2	"Santa Bring My Baby Back (to Me)"	Elvis Presley	7	13 December 1957	1
13 December 1957	4	"Alone"	Petula Clark	8	13 December 1957	1
13 December 1957	7	"Reet Petite" ♦	Jackie Wilson	6	3 January 1958	1
20 December 1957	12	"All the Way"/"Chicago" ♦	Frank Sinatra	3	17 January 1958	2
20 December 1957	2	"Let's Have a Ball"	Winifred Atwell	4	27 December 1957	1
27 December 1957	7	"Great Balls of Fire" ♦	Jerry Lee Lewis	1	10 January 1958	2

== Entries by artist ==
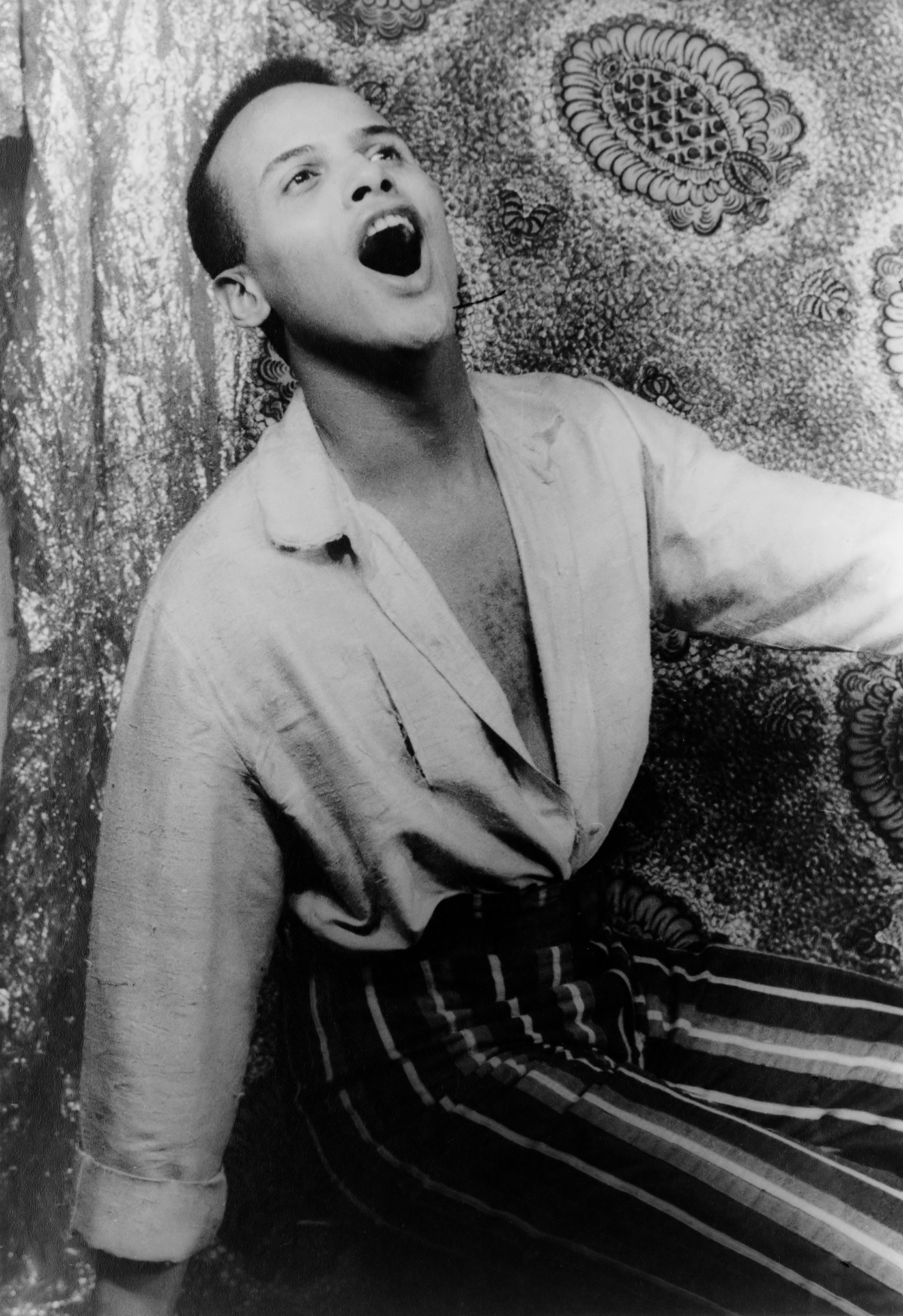
Harry Belafonte had three UK top 10 entries this year, including the year's Christmas number-one, "Mary's Boy Child".

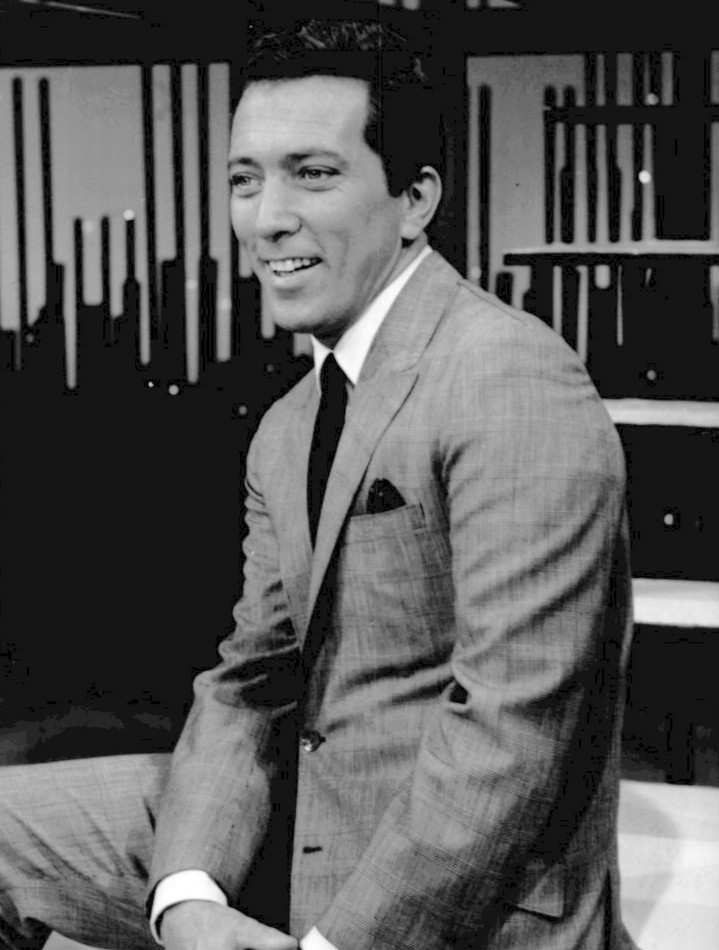
Andy Williams made his UK chart debut in 1957 with his version of Charlie Gracie's "Butterfly", which spent two weeks at number-one. While Williams would have a further eight UK top 10 hits during his lifetime, "Butterfly" remains his only UK number-one single.

The following table shows artists who achieved two or more top 10 entries in 1957, including singles that reached their peak in 1956 or 1958. The figures include both main artists and featured artists. The total number of weeks an artist spent in the top ten in 1957 is also shown.

Entries	Artist	Weeks	Singles
7	Elvis Presley ^{[N]}	47	"All Shook Up", "Hound Dog", "(Let Me Be Your) Teddy Bear", "Paralyzed", "Party", "Santa Bring My Baby Back (to Me)", "Too Much"
4	Frankie Vaughan ^{[N]}	23	"Got-Ta Have Something in the Bank, Frank", "Man on Fire"/"Wanderin' Eyes", "The Garden of Eden", "The Green Door"
4	Lonnie Donegan	34	"Cumberland Gap", "Don't You Rock Me Daddy-O", "My Dixie Darling", "Gamblin' Man"/"Puttin' On the Style"
4	Pat Boone	44	"Don't Forbid Me", "Friendly Persuasion (Thee I Love)", "Love Letters in the Sand", "Remember You're Mine"/"There's a Gold Mine in the Sky"
3	Guy Mitchell ^{[O]}	31	"Knee Deep in the Blues", "Rock-a-Billy", "Singing the Blues"
3	Harry Belafonte	31	"Day-O (The Banana Boat Song)", "Island in the Sun", "Mary's Boy Child"
3	Johnnie Ray ^{[N]}	20	"Just Walkin' in the Rain", "Yes Tonight Josephine", "Look Homeward, Angel"
3	Little Richard	13	"Long Tall Sally", "Lucille", "The Girl Can't Help It"
3	Tommy Steele	17	"Butterfingers", "Singing the Blues", "Water, Water"/"A Handful of Songs"
2	Bill Haley & His Comets ^{[N]}	5	"Don't Knock the Rock", "Rip It Up"
2	Bing Crosby ^{[O]}	24	"Around the World", "True Love"
2	Charlie Gracie	9	"Fabulous", "Wanderin' Eyes"
2	The Everly Brothers	11	"Bye Bye Love", "Wake Up Little Susie"
2	Jerry Lee Lewis ^{[P]}	4	"Whole Lotta Shakin' Goin' On", "Great Balls of Fire"
2	Malcolm Vaughan ^{[N]}^{[P]}	11	"My Special Angel", "St. Therese of the Roses
2	Paul Anka	20	"Diana", "I Love You Baby"
2	Petula Clark	11	"Alone", "With All My Heart"
2	Tab Hunter	20	"Ninety-Nine Ways", "Young Love"
2	The Vipers Skiffle Group	2	"Cumberland Gap", "Don't You Rock Me Daddy-O"

== Notes ==
- ^{a} "Reet Petite" reached its peak of number six on 9 January 1958 (week ending).
- ^{b} "Hound Dog" re-entered the top 10 at number 8 on 10 January 1957 (week ending) for 4 weeks and at number 10 on 14 February 1957 (week ending).
- ^{c} "A Woman in Love" re-entered the top 10 at number 10 on 10 January 1957 (week ending).
- ^{d} "Friendly Persuasion (Thee I Love)" re-entered the top 10 at number 10 on 28 March 1957 (week ending).
- ^{e} "The Garden of Eden" re-entered the top 10 at number 10 on 4 April 1957 (week ending).
- ^{f} "When I Fall in Love" re-entered the top 10 at number 9 on 16 May 1957 (week ending) for 11 weeks.
- ^{g} "Mr. Wonderful" re-entered the top 10 at number 7 on 11 July 1957 (week ending).
- ^{h} Bing Crosby's version of "Around the World" re-entered the top 10 at number 9 on 1 August 1957 (week ending) and at number 10 on 22 August 1957 (week ending).
- ^{i} "(Let Me Be Your) Teddy Bear" re-entered the top 10 at number 9 on 31 October 1957 (week ending).
- ^{j} "Love Letters in the Sand" is recorded as the best-selling single of the year by some sources but the Official Charts Company lists "Diana" as its best-seller.
- ^{k} "Diana" re-entered the top 10 at number 10 on 9 January 1958 (week ending).
- ^{l} "Water Water"/"A Handful of Songs" re-entered the top 10 at number 9 on 7 October 1957 (week ending).
- ^{m} "Mary's Boy Child" re-entered the top 10 at number 10 on 25 December 1958 (week ending).
- ^{n} Figure includes single that peaked in 1956.
- ^{o} Figure includes single that first charted in 1956 but peaked in 1957.
- ^{p} Figure includes single that peaked in 1958.

== See also ==
- 1957 in British music
- List of number-one singles from the 1950s (UK)
