= Golden Hits – 15 Hits of Pat Boone =

Compilation album by Pat Boone
- Released: 1967
- Genre: Pop
- Label: Dot
- Producer: Randy Wood

Pat Boone compilation album chronology
The Gold Collection (1964)	Golden Hits – 15 Hits of Pat Boone (1967)	Best of Pat Boone (1982)

Professional ratings
Review scores
Source	Rating
AllMusic	2/5 stars
Billboard	positive ("Special merit" pick)

Golden Hits – 15 Hits of Pat Boone is an album by Pat Boone, released in 1967 on Dot Records.

Back in 1967, Billboard picked the album for the August 19 issue's "Special merit" section.

In his retrospective review for the website AllMusic, Arthur Rowe opines, it is "far from the best Pat Boone compilation on the market" and "suggested only to completists who absolutely must have everything in the singer's catalog".

== Track listing ==
Side one
No.	Title	Writer(s)	Length
1.	"Love Letters in the Sand"	N. Kenny; C. Kenny; F. Coots	2:12
2.	"Friendly Persuasion"	Webster; Tiomkin	2:53
3.	"Moody River"	Gary Bruce	2:38
4.	"I Almost Lost My Mind"	Ivory Joe Hunter	2:27
5.	"Why Baby Why"	Dixon; Harrison	1:57
6.	"Anastasia"	Webster; Newman	2:56
7.	"Don't Forbid Me"	Charles Singleton	2:14
8.	"April Love"	Webster; Fain	2:39

Side two
No.	Title	Writer(s)	Length
1.	"Speedy Gonzales"	Kaye; Lee; Hill	2:30
2.	"It's Too Soon to Know"	Deborah Chessler	2:32
3.	"A Wonderful Time Up There"	Lee Roy Abernathy	2:04
4.	"With the Wind and the Rain in Your Hair"	Edwards; Lawrence	2:35
5.	"Sugar Moon"	Danny Wolfe	1:53
6.	"'Twixt Twelve and Twenty"	Schroeder; Gold	2:18
7.	"There's a Gold Mine in the Sky"	N. Kenny; C. Kenny	2:22
