= Wish You Were Here, Buddy =

Wish You Were Here, Buddy may refer to:

- "Wish You Were Here, Buddy" (song), a 1966 single by Pat Boone
- Wish You Were Here, Buddy (album), a 1966 album by Pat Boone
