= Golden Hits =

Golden Hits may refer to:

- Lady of the Stars by Donovan, packaged as Golden Hits, 1996
- The Drifters' Golden Hits, a 1968 compilation album by American doo wop/R&B vocal group The Drifters
- Golden Hits – 15 Hits of Pat Boone, a 1967 greatest hits album by Pat Boone
- The Magic of Boney M. – 20 Golden Hits, a 1980 greatest hits album by Boney M.
- Golden Hits (Demis Roussos album), 1975
- Golden Hits of the Smothers Brothers, Vol. 2, the Smothers Brothers' first greatest hits album
- The Golden Hits of Sandie Shaw, a compilation album by 1960s British singer Sandie Shaw
- Golden Hits of the Four Seasons, 1963
- Golden Hits (Turtles album), 1967
- Golden Hits (Westlife album)
