= Throw It Away =

Throw It Away may refer to:

- "Throw It Away" (Family Guy), an episode from season 17 of Family Guy
- "Throw It Away", a song by Pat Boone, from the 1976 album Texas Woman
- "Throw It Away", a song by Abbey Lincoln, from the 1980 album "Painted Lady" (a.k.a. "Golden Lady", 1981)
- "Throw It Away", a song by Delta Goodrem from the 2003 album Innocent Eyes
- "Throw It Away" (Slaughterhouse song), from the 2012 album Welcome to: Our House
- "Throw It Away" (Trippie Redd song), from the 2019 album !
- "Throw It Away", a song by Summer Walker from the 2021 album Still Over It
