= I'll See You in My Dreams =

I'll See You in My Dreams may refer to:

== Music ==
- I'll See You in My Dreams (Doris Day album), an album featuring songs from the soundtrack of the 1951 film
- I'll See You in My Dreams (Pat Boone album), 1962
- "I'll See You in My Dreams" (1924 song), a popular song
- "I'll See You in My Dreams" (Giant song), a 1989 song
- "I'll See You in My Dreams" (Bruce Springsteen song), a 2020 song

== Films ==
- I'll See You in My Dreams (1951 film), a musical film, starring Doris Day and Danny Thomas, directed by Michael Curtiz
- I'll See You in My Dreams (2003 film), a horror short film, directed by Miguel Ángel Vivas
- I'll See You in My Dreams (2015 film), a drama film starring Blythe Danner

== See also ==
- "Goodnight, Irene", a song first recorded in 1933 by Lead Belly, whose chorus concludes with the line "I'll see you in my dreams"
- If I See You in My Dreams, manga and anime by Noriyuki "Hanako" Yamahana
