= Anastasia (song) =

Single by Pat Boone

from the album Pat's Great Hits
- A-side: "Anastasia" "Don't Forbid Me"
- Released: 1956
- Length: 2:14
- Label: Dot
- Songwriter(s): Paul Francis Webster, Alfred Newman

Pat Boone singles chronology
"Friendly Persuasion" / "Chains of Love" (1956)	"Anastasia" / "Don't Forbid Me" (1956)	"Why Baby Why" (1957)

Audio
- "Anastasia" on YouTube

"Anastasia" is the theme song of the 1956 moving picture Anastasia. It was written by Paul Francis Webster and Alfred Newman.

Pat Boone recorded his version on November 10, 1956. Soon it was released as a single (Dot 45-15521, with "Don't Forbid Me" on the flip side). Billboard wrote in its December 1 review: "Many versions of the theme of the Ingrid Bergman starrer are reported, but it will take something very unusual to surpass Boone's suave styling of this lovely, dreamy tune. His long line of hits is not likely to be broken, particularly since the flip also is strong" and two weeks later added: "Boone has a two-sided powerhouse here that has been clicking from the word "Go". "Anastasia" is leading rival versions of the tune by a considerable margin". The song reached number 37 in the United States.

== Track listing ==
7" single (Dot 45-15521, 1957)
No.	Title	Length
1.	"Don't Forbid Me"	2:14
2.	"Anastasia"	2:56

== Charts ==
"Don't Forbid Me" / "Anastasia"

Chart (1957)	Peak position
US Billboard Best Sellers in Stores	3
