= Pat's Great Hits =

Compilation album by Pat Boone
- Released: 1957
- Genre: Pop
- Length: 29:45
- Label: Dot

Pat Boone compilation album chronology
Pat's Great Hits (1957)	Pat Boone Sings (1959)

Professional ratings
Review scores
Source	Rating
Billboard	positive ("Spotlight" pick)

Pat's Great Hits is the first greatest-hits album by Pat Boone. It was released in 1957 on Dot Records.

== Chart performance ==
The album peaked at No. 3 on the Billboard Best Selling Pop LP's chart, during a thirty six-week run on the chart.

== Track listing ==
Side one
No.	Title	Length
1.	"Love Letters in the Sand"	2:16
2.	"Why Baby Why"	2:00
3.	"Anastasia"	3:00
4.	"Bernardine"	2:11
5.	"Remember You're Mine"	2:18
6.	"Chains of Love"	2:57

Side two
No.	Title	Length
1.	"Don't Forbid Me"	2:21
2.	"I'm in Love with You"	2:23
3.	"Friendly Persuasion"	3:00
4.	"I Almost Lost My Mind"	2:38
5.	"I'm Waiting Just for You"	2:22
6.	"There's a Gold Mine in the Sky"	2:19

== Charts ==
Chart (1957)	Peak position
US Billboard Best Selling Pop LP's	3

== Certifications ==
Region	Certification	Certified units/sales
United States (RIAA)	Gold	500,000^{^}
^{^} Shipments figures based on certification alone.
