= American Glory =

American Glory may refer to:

- American Glory (ship), operated by American Cruise Lines
- American Glory (horse), 1951 winner of Palm Beach Stakes
- American Glory (album), a 2002 album by Pat Boone
