= Gold Mine in the Sky =

1938 film by Joseph Kane, Betty Burbridge

- Theatrical release poster
- Directed by: Joseph Kane
- Screenplay by: Betty Burbridge; Jack Natteford
- Story by: Betty Burbridge
- Produced by: Charles E. Ford (associate)
- Starring: Gene Autry; Smiley Burnette; Carol Hughes
- Cinematography: William Nobles
- Music by: Alberto Colombo
- Production company: Republic Pictures
- Distributed by: Republic Pictures
- Release date: July 4, 1938 (U.S.)
- Running time: 60 minutes
- Country: United States
- Language: English

Gold Mine in the Sky is a 1938 Western film directed by Joseph Kane and starring Gene Autry, Smiley Burnette, and Carol Hughes. Based on a story by Betty Burbridge, the film is about a singing cowboy and ranch foreman who, as executor of the owner's will, must see that the daughter and heiress does not marry without his approval.

== Plot ==
Gene Autry plays a singing ranch foreman who, as executor of the will of the property's owner, must ensure that Cody, the daughter/heiress (played by Hughes) doesn't marry without his approval. Cody wishes to marry Larry Cummings (Craig Reynolds), but Gene refuses, prompting Cummings to attempt to have Gene killed. When this fails, Cummings then demands money so Cody stages a fake kidnapping to raise the funds. However, her plan backfires after Cummings learns about it and turns it into a real kidnapping.

== Cast ==
- Gene Autry as Gene Autry
- Smiley Burnette as Frog
- Carol Hughes as Cody Langham
- J.L. Franks' Golden West Cowboys as Musicians and Cowhands
- Craig Reynolds as Larry Cummings
- Helen Ainsworth as Jane Crocker
- LeRoy Mason as Red Kuzak
- Frankie Marvin as Cowhand Joe
- Robert Homans as 'Lucky' Langham
- Eddie Cherkose as Sykes
- Ben Corbett as Spud Grogan
- Milburn Morante as Mugsy Malone
- Jim Corey as Henchman Chet
- George Guhl as Constable Cy
- Maudie Prickett as customer (uncredited)
- The Stafford Sisters as The Levinsky Trio
- Champion as Gene's Horse (uncredited)
- Matty Roubert as Cowhand

== Production ==
=== Stuntwork ===
- Nellie Walker
- Joe Yrigoyen

=== Filming locations ===
- Jack Garner Ranch
- Action Railway Depot
- Keen Camp, State Highway 74, Mountain Center, San Jacinto Mountains, California, USA
- Lake Hemet, State Highway 74, San Bernardino National Forest, California, USA

=== Soundtrack ===
- "There's a Gold Mine in the Sky" (Charles Kenny, Nick Kenny) by Gene Autry and Cowhands
- "Hummin' When We're Comin' Round the Bend" (Eddie Cherkose, Alberto Colombo) by Gene Autry, Smiley Burnette, Fred 'Snowflake' Toones, Jack Kirk and Cowhands
- "There's No Place Like Home (Home, Sweet Home)" (H.R. Bishop, John Howard Payne) by Smiley Burnette (a cappella) and Helen Ainsworth (whistling)
- "That's How Donkeys Were Born" (Eddie Cherkose, Smiley Burnette) by Smiley Burnette, Frankie Marvin, and J.L. Franks' Golden West Cowboys
- "Frühlingslied (Spring Song) Op.62 #6" (Felix Mendelssohn-Bartholdy) by The Stafford Sisters
- "Dude Ranch Cowhands" (Gene Autry, Fred Rose, Johnny Marvin) by Gene Autry, Smiley Burnette, The Stafford Sisters, and J.L. Franks' Golden West Cowboys
- "I'd Love to Call You My Sweetheart" (Joe Goodwin, Larry Shay, Paul Ash) by Gene Autry
- "Hike Yaa Move Along" (Smiley Burnette) by Gene Autry, Smiley Burnette, and Cowhands
- "Tumbleweed Tenor" (Eddie Cherkose, Smiley Burnette) by Smiley Burnette, Frankie Marvin, and J.L. Franks' Golden West Cowboys
- "As Long as I Have My Horse" (Gene Autry, Fred Rose, Johnny Marvin) by Gene Autry
