= Alone (1935 song) =

1935 song

Alone is a popular musical number, first performed by Allan Jones and Kitty Carlisle in the 1935 Marx Brothers film A Night at the Opera.

The lyrics were written by Arthur Freed, with music by Nacio Herb Brown.

Popular versions in 1936 were by the Tommy Dorsey orchestra (vocal by Cliff Weston), Hal Kemp, and by Al Donahue (vocal by Harry McKinley).

== Other recordings ==
- Primo Scala's Accordion Band (vocal by Vera Lynn) (1936)
- Sam Costa - Regal Zonophone G22842 (Australian 78 rpm pressing) (1936)
- Sarah Vaughan on her 1957 album At Mister Kelly's.
- Johnny Hartman on his 1959 album And I Thought About You.
- Pat Boone on his 1962 album, I'll See You in My Dreams
- Dinah Washington - for the album Unforgettable (1961)
- The Melachrino Strings -for the album More Music For Relaxation (1961)

== Popular culture ==
- The song was also performed by Judy Garland in the 1940 film Andy Hardy Meets Debutante.
