= The Country Side of Pat Boone =

Studio album by Pat Boone
- Released: 1976
- Genre: Country
- Label: MC / Motown
- Producer: Ray Ruff

Pat Boone chronology
Texas Woman (1976)	The Country Side of Pat Boone (1976)	Miracle Merry-Go-Round (1977)

Professional ratings
Review scores
Source	Rating
AllMusic	1.5/5 stars

The Country Side of Pat Boone is the 54th studio album and a country album by Pat Boone, released in 1976 on Motown's subsidiary MC Records.

It was the second and final of two albums Boone recorded for Motown's Nashville division in the second half of the 1970s.

== Track listing ==
Side one
No.	Title	Writer(s)	Length
1.	"Whatever Happened to the Good Old Honky Tonk"	Lee Dresser
2.	"Texas Woman"	Bob Duncan; Steve Stone
3.	"A Natural Feelin' for You"	Ben Peters
4.	"Cowboys and Daddies"	Marty Cooper
5.	"We've Been Malled"	Larry Groce

Side two
No.	Title	Writer(s)	Length
1.	"Ain't Going Down in the Ground Before My Time"	Glenn Ray
2.	"I'd Do It with You"	Bobby Springfield
3.	"Love Light Comes A Shinin'"	Oskar Solomon
4.	"Throw It Away"	Rafe Vanhoy; Curly Putman
5.	"Colorado Country Morning"	T. Duncan; J. Cunningham
