= Bernardine (film) =

1957 film by Henry Levin

- Film poster
- Directed by: Henry Levin
- Written by: Mary Chase (play); Theodore Reeves (screenplay)
- Produced by: Samuel G. Engel
- Starring: Pat Boone; Terry Moore; Dick Sargent
- Cinematography: Paul C. Vogel
- Edited by: David Bretherton
- Music by: Lionel Newman; Johnny Mercer
- Production company: Twentieth Century-Fox Film Corp.
- Distributed by: 20th Century Fox
- Release date: July 24, 1957
- Running time: 95 minutes
- Country: United States
- Language: English
- Budget: $1.23 million
- Box office: $3.75 million (US rentals)

Bernardine is a 1957 American musical film directed by Henry Levin and starring Pat Boone in his feature film debut, Terry Moore, Dean Jagger, Dick Sargent, and (in her last film, after a 19-year hiatus) Janet Gaynor. The 1952 play upon which the movie is based was written by Mary Coyle Chase, the Denver playwright who also wrote the popular 1944 Broadway play Harvey. The title song, with words and music by Johnny Mercer, became a hit record for Boone.

== Plot ==
At Wingate High School, a group of pals, including Griner, Arthur "Beau" Beaumont and Sanford "Fofo Bidnut" Wilson, race cars and boats, hang out at an after-school place called the Shamrock Club, and jokingly profess their love for a mythical dream girl named Bernardine Mudd from Sneaky Falls, Idaho.

Sanford, who is academically and socially behind his pals, declares that he intends to take a date to see bongo king Jack Costanzo perform at the Black Cat Club. When the boys call the local phone company for the fictional Bernardine's phone number, a young operator named Jean answers the phone. Soon she accepts a date with Sanford.

The love-struck Sanford feels that he has found his "Bernardine". But when his widowed mother talks about remarrying, and he realizes he could flunk out of school rather than graduate, he decides to briefly put his new romance on the back burner. His friends try to help him with his problems, but their well-meaning attempts do not go as planned.

== Cast ==
- Pat Boone as Arthur "Beau" Beaumont
- Terry Moore as Jean Cantrick
- Janet Gaynor as Mrs. Ruth Wilson
- Dean Jagger as J. Fullerton Weldy
- Dick Sargent as Sanford Wilson (credited as Richard Sargent)
- James Drury as Lt. Langley Beaumont
- Ronnie Burns as Griner
- Walter Abel as Mr. Beaumont
- Natalie Schafer as Mrs. Madge Beaumont
- Isabel Jewell as Mrs. McDuff
- Edith Angold as Hilda
- Val Benedict as Morgan Friedelhauser
- Emestine Wade as Cleo
- Russ Conway as Mr. Mason
- Thomas Pittman as George Olson
- Jack Costanzo as himself - Orchestra leader
- Hooper Dunbar as Vernon Kinswood

== Production ==
Buddy Adler of 20th Century Fox bought the film rights in 1955 as a vehicle for Robert Wagner. The film, however, was reworked as a vehicle for Pat Boone. In 1956 Boone was one of the biggest music artists in the US. Several movie studios pursued him and Adler was successful, signing him to a multi-picture contract with Fox. Bernardine was to be his first film.

Boone tested for the roles of both Beaumont and Sanford. He was eventually cast as Beaumont - the role played on stage by John Kerr. Dick Sargent received his first important screen role as Sanford. (Edd Byrnes reportedly also tested for the role.) Janet Gaynor was lured out of retirement to co-star as Sanford's mother.

Filming on Bernardine started February 4, 1957 and was completed on March 27, 1957.

== Songs ==
- "Bernardine"
- "Love Letters in the Sand"
- "Technique"

== Reception ==
In the 21st century, TV Guide called Bernardine "... Fox's answer to the Presley films. Boone, who first achieved national recognition on Arthur Godfrey's TV show, is the white on white hero, one of several young and definitely unsleazy students who create a mythical girl named Bernardine that they would all love to love."

In 2019, Diabolique magazine, criticizing Sargent's performance in the leading role, said the filmmakers erred by not giving Boone that part instead. "This weird casting decision was presumably made so as not to burden Pat too much on his first time out. After all, in Love Me Tender, Elvis plays a supporting role to Richard Egan. Later, in Hound Dog Man (1959), Fabian would support Stuart Whitman. But those were good parts. Pat Boone’s role is lousy. The main thing he does in the movie is sing (including “Love Letters in the Sand” which became a huge hit) and introduce an elder brother (James Drury) who runs off with Terry Moore. Boone's presence even throws the movie off a little. He gets screen time his character doesn't deserve, and when he sings love songs — despite not having an on-screen love interest — it feels weird."

== See also ==
- List of American films of 1957
