= Robins and Roses =

Single by Bing Crosby
- B-side: "We'll Rest at the End of the Trail"; (Curt Poulton / Fred Rose)
- Released: 1936
- Recorded: March 29, 1936
- Genre: Pop
- Length: 2:57
- Label: Decca DLA323-A
- Songwriter(s): Joe Burke, Edgar Leslie

"Robins and Roses" is a 1936 song with music by Joe Burke, and lyrics by Edgar Leslie.

== Selected recordings ==
- 1936 Bing Crosby recorded March 29, 1936 with Victor Young and his Orchestra. Crosby's recording was very popular and reached No. 2 in the charts of the day.
- 1936 Orville Knapp - his Brunswick recording charted briefly just before Knapp's death in a plane crash.
- 1936 Jimmy Dorsey and his Orchestra - recorded March 28, 1936, vocal by Kay Weber, for Decca Records (catalog 776A).
- 1936 Tommy Dorsey and his Orchestra - recorded March 25, 1936 for Victor Records (catalog No. 25284), vocal by Edythe Wright.
- 1958 Pat Boone on his album Yes Indeed!
- 1958 Jeri Southern for her album Jeri Southern Meets Johnny Smith.
