= Gone Fishin' (song) =

Gone Fishin' is a song written by Nick and Charles Kenny.

== Background ==
The song had been published in 1950 and was recorded by Arthur Godfrey, The Three Suns with Texas Jim Robertson, and by the Johnny Guarnieri Quintet in 1950. None of these recordings charted. The version by The Three Suns with Texas Jim Robertson became the theme song for the TV show "American Sportsman" featuring Harold Ensley, which ran for 48 years on Television.

== Bing Crosby and Louis Armstrong recording ==
In 1951, "Gone Fishin'" was recorded by Bing Crosby and Louis Armstrong. The Crosby recording came about when the singer had Armstrong as a guest on his radio show which was being taped on April 19, 1951, for broadcast on April 25 that year. As was customary, the songs to be used in the broadcast were taped in advance as a back-up in case the live broadcast versions did not go well. The song was so well received that Decca Records decided to issue the pre-recording commercially, and it charted briefly in June 1951 with a peak position of #19. Crosby used the song in his concert performances in 1976 singing it with comedian Ted Rogers. The duet with Louis Armstrong is still heard frequently on the radio.

== Later recordings ==
The song was later recorded by:

- Pat Boone recorded it for his Yes Indeed! LP (1958)<
- Gene Autry
- The Manhattan Transfer.
