= With You (Irving Berlin song) =

Song
- Written: 1929
- Songwriter: Irving Berlin

"With You" is a 1929 song by Irving Berlin. The lyrics commence: " With you, a sunny day; / Without you, clouds in the sky". The song was sung by Harry Richman and Joan Bennett in the 1930 film Puttin' On the Ritz.

== Other recorded versions ==
- Guy Lombardo and His Royal Canadians (vocal: Carmen Lombardo) had a popular version in 1930.
- Howdy! by Pat Boone (1957).
