= Pat Boone Sings Winners of the Reader's Digest Poll =

Studio album by Pat Boone
- Released: 1965
- Genre: Pop
- Label: Dot
- Producer: Randy Wood

Pat Boone chronology
My 10th Anniversary with Dot Records (1965)	Pat Boone Sings Winners of the Reader's Digest Poll (1965)	Great Hits of 1965 (1966)

Professional ratings
Review scores
Source	Rating
AllMusic	2.5/5 stars

Pat Boone Sings Winners of the Reader's Digest Poll is the 31st studio album by Pat Boone, released in 1965 on Dot Records.

== Track listing ==
Side one
No.	Title	Writer(s)	Length
1.	"You'll Never Walk Alone"	Hammerstein II; Rodgers	2:59
2.	"Misty"	Burke; Garner	3:08
3.	"Moonlight Serenade"	Parish; Miller	2:46
4.	"Smoke Gets in Your Eyes"	Harbach; Kern	3:07
5.	"Tonight"	Sondheim; Bernstein	2:02
6.	"Night and Day"	Cole Porter	2:14

Side two
No.	Title	Writer(s)	Length
1.	"Tea for Two"	Youmans; Caesar	2:25
2.	"All the Things You Are"	Hammerstein II; Kern	2:32
3.	"I Left My Heart in San Francisco"	Cross; Cory	2:25
4.	"We Gaze on Tomorrow"	Boone; King	2:59
5.	"As Time Goes By"	Herman Hupfeld	2:48
6.	"Ol' Man River"	Hammerstein II; Kern	2:12
