= Malcolm Vaughan =

British singer (1929–2010)

Background information
- Born: Malcolm James Thomas; 22 March 1929; Abercynon, South Wales
- Died: 9 February 2010 (aged 80) Eastbourne, East Sussex, England
- Genres: Traditional pop
- Label: His Master's Voice

Malcolm Vaughan (born Malcolm James Thomas; 22 March 1929 – 9 February 2010) was a Welsh traditional pop singer and actor. Known for his distinctive tenor voice, he had a number of chart hits in the United Kingdom during the 1950s.

== Biography ==
Born Malcolm James Thomas, in Abercynon, South Wales, he spent much of his childhood in the village of Troedyrhiw, near Merthyr Tydfil after his family relocated there, and sang with the local choir.

He first appeared as a stage actor in 1944 when he was cast in Emlyn Williams's comedy The Druid's Rest at the St. Martin's Theatre in London's West End and went on to appear at the London Hippodrome in the musical comedy Jenny Jones, where his singing abilities were first noted by the critic James Agate who said of him that he was "allowed to talk too much and sing too little". He followed this up with a role in a variety show organized by the bandleader and impresario Jack Hylton, and a part in the Thornton Wilder play The Skin of Our Teeth at the Piccadilly Theatre, which was directed by Laurence Olivier and also appeared in the first stage production of the popular BBC Children's Hour programme The Adventures of Larry the Lamb in which he was Dennis the Dachshund, and was an errand boy in the film Bedelia alongside Margaret Lockwood.

He was called up for National Service in 1947, and served with the Army in Egypt and Greece, but returned to acting after being demobbed and appeared in Aladdin and Dick Whittington on ice in Brighton, and in 1952 teamed up with three other vocalists to form the Welsh Street Singers and also went on to support Old Mother Riley in pantomime, then appeared in the revue Going Gay in Eastbourne in 1953, where he befriended the comedian Kenneth Earle. The pair decided to form a double act, but did not like the sound of "Earle and Thomas". However, after trying out different names they settled on "Earle and Vaughan". In 1963, Malcolm Thomas changed his name by deed poll to Malcolm Vaughan.

Alongside Earle, Vaughan became the straight man in half of a comedy double act in variety theatre. It was here that his singing career began to develop thanks to his strong voice and after the BBC disc jockey Jack Jackson saw Earle and Vaughan performing at the Chiswick Empire in 1955. Jackson was impressed with Vaughan's impersonation of Mario Lanza and arranged an audition with the head of His Master's Voice, Wally Ridley. Ridley encouraged Vaughan to record popular ballads of the day and Vaughan had his first hit with "Ev'ry Day of My Life" in 1955. The song reached No. 5 in the UK Singles Chart. "Ev'ry Day of My Life" was the first of many hits he achieved throughout the latter half of the 1950s, three other major releases being "St. Therese of the Roses" in 1956, 1957's "My Special Angel" and "More Than Ever" ("Come prima") in 1958.

In October 1956, he was scheduled to appear on BBC TV's Off The Record to promote the release of "St. Therese of the Roses". However, the appearance was cancelled after a BBC committee decided that the song was unsuitable for broadcast because "the lyric is contrary both to Roman Catholic doctrine and to Protestant sentiment." The resulting controversy coupled with airplay on Radio Luxembourg ensured the record's success. It climbed to No. 3 and stayed in the UK Singles Chart for five months and ultimately sold half a million copies.

Also in 1956, Earle and Vaughan made their debut at the London Palladium in The British Record Show, and in January 1957 they appeared on ITV's Sunday Night at the London Palladium. Later in 1957 Vaughan appeared in that year's Royal Variety Show alongside other 1950s stars, including Ronnie Hilton, Dickie Valentine and David Whitfield. In 1960, he took part in the national preselection to represent the United Kingdom in that year's Eurovision Song Contest, singing "Each Tomorrow", but he was beaten by Bryan Johnson, whose "Looking High, High, High" went on to finish in second place. In 1961 Vaughan was inducted into the exclusive entertainment fraternity, the Grand Order of Water Rats.

The rise in popularity of rock and roll saw a dramatic change in musical tastes, and unlike many of his contemporaries, Vaughan's musical career barely survived into the 1960s. However, he continued to act, mostly doing theatre work, and his music continues to be played on the radio. Earle and Vaughan continued as a double act throughout the 1960s before deciding to split up in 1972. Kenneth Earle went on to become an agent, while Vaughan continued on stage, touring in productions of The Good Old Days. He retired in 1982. Vaughan spent a few of his latter years working on the switchboard at the RAF Central Medical Establishment in London. In his later years, Vaughan was diagnosed with Alzheimer's disease. In 2009, his wife published his autobiography, which helped to raise money for a local Alzheimer's charity.

He died, at the age of 80, on 9 February 2010 in Eastbourne, East Sussex, England. He is survived by his widow, Gay (née Hands), and two sons, Daryl Earle Haydn Samuel (born 1957) and Damon Charles Michael (born 1963).

== Hit songs ==
All chart hits were on the His Master's Voice label.

- "Ev'ry Day of My Life" / "Mama" (1955) UK No. 5
- "More Than A Millionaire" / "Take Me Back Again" (1955)
- "With Your Love" / "Small Talk" (1955) UK No. 18
- "Only You (And You Alone)" / "I'll Be Near You" (1956)
- "St. Therese of the Roses" / "Love Me as Though There Were No Tomorrow" (1956) UK No. 3
- "The World is Mine" / "Now" (1957) UK No. 26
- "Chapel of The Roses" / "Guardian Angel" (1957) UK No. 13
- "Oh My Papa" / "What Is My Destiny" (1957)
- "My Special Angel" / "The Heart of a Child" (1957) UK No. 3
- "To Be Loved" / "My Loving Arms" (1958) UK No. 14
- "Ev'ry Hour Ev'ry Day of My Life" / "Miss You" (1958)
- "More Than Ever" ("Come prima") / "A Night to Remember" (1958) UK No. 5
- "Wait for Me" (Ti dirò) / "Willingly" (1959) UK No. 13
- "You'll Never Walk Alone" / "The Holy City" (1959)
- "Oh So Wunderbar" / "For Everyone in Love" (1960)
- "My Love For You" / "Lady of Spain" (1960)
- "There's No Other Love" / "Dolce Vita" (1961)
- "The Wedding" / "Guardian Angel" (1961)
- "This Side of Heaven" / "The Love of a Lifetime" (1963)
