= Christmas Is A Comin' =

Studio album by Pat Boone
- Released: 1966
- Genre: Pop, Christmas
- Label: Dot
- Producer: Jimmie Haskell

Pat Boone chronology
Wish You Were Here, Buddy (1966)	Christmas Is A Comin' (1966)	How Great Thou Art (1967)

Professional ratings
Review scores
Source	Rating
AllMusic	2/5 stars
Billboard	positive ("Spotlight" pick)

Christmas Is A Comin' is the 35th studio album and a Christmas album by Pat Boone, released in 1966 on Dot Records.

Billboard picked the album for its "Spotlight" section. "The opener "Christmas Is A Comin'" is a sparkler and then [Boone] adds a fresh touch to such favorites as "Winter Wonderland" and "Do You Hear What I Hear," says the magazine.

== Track listing ==
Side one
No.	Title	Writer(s)	Length
1.	"Christmas Is A Comin'"	Frank Luther	1:55
2.	"The Christmas Waltz"		2:25
3.	"Do You Hear What I Hear"		2:23
4.	"Rudolph the Red-Nosed Reindeer"		2:22
5.	"Little Green Tree"	Pat Boone	2:55

Side two
No.	Title	Writer(s)	Length
1.	"The Chosen Ones"	Bernier; Burns	2:17
2.	"Blue Christmas"		2:17
3.	"The Christmas Song"		2:08
4.	"Winter Wonderland"		2:24
5.	"Santa's Comin' in a Whirlybird"	F. Starr	2:01
6.	"We Wish You a Merry Christmas"		2:23
