= Howdy! (Pat Boone album) =

Studio album by Pat Boone
- Released: September 1956
- Label: Dot
- Producer: Randy Wood

Pat Boone chronology
Pat Boone (1956)	Howdy! (1956)	"Pat" (1957)

Professional ratings
Review scores
Source	Rating
AllMusic	4.5/5 stars
Billboard	positive ("Spotlight" pick)
The Encyclopedia of Popular Music	3/5 stars

Howdy! is the second studio album by Pat Boone, released in 1956. It followed a self-titled compilation album of previously released singles, making Howdy! Boone's studio album debut.

== Chart performance ==
The album peaked at No. 14 on the Billboard Best Selling Pop Albums chart, during a four-week run on the chart. On Cashbox, the album peaked at No. 12. Billboard listed Howdy! as the 19th best selling pop album of 1956, and as the 17th most played by radio.

== Reception ==
AllMusic wrote: "Boone's musical instincts are keenly evident to the senses: never too much when exercising his strong young voice on 'Lucky Old Sun', never too little with the sweet subtlety of 'Would You Like to Take a Walk?'."

Billboard noted that Boone eschews rock and roll, to "concentrate on standards, old and new, in a variety of moods from happily smooth-out blues to soft-throated ballads."

== Track listing ==
A1 "Begin the Beguine" (Cole Porter)
A2 "Hummin' the Blues" (Beasley Smith, Billy Vaughn)
A3 "Would You Like to Take a Walk?" (Billy Rose, Harry Warren, Mort Dixon)
A4 "All I Do Is Dream Of You" (Arthur Freed, Nacio Herb Brown)
A5 "That Lucky Old Sun" (Beasley Smith, Haven Gillespie)
A6 "Beg Your Pardon" (Beasley Smith, Francis Craig)
B1 "Chattanooga Shoe Shine Boy" (Harry Stone, Jack Stapp)
B2 "With You" (Irving Berlin)
B3 "Every Little Thing" (Beasley Smith)
B4 "Forgive Me" (Jack Yellen, Milton Ager)
B5 "Sunday" (Chester Conn, Benny Krueger, Jule Styne, Ned Miller)
B6 "Harbor Lights" (Jimmy Kennedy, P.K. DeGooreynd)

== Charts ==
Chart (1956)	Peak position
US Billboard Best Selling Pop Albums	14
US Cashbox Top Albums	12
