= Pat Boone Sings Irving Berlin =

Studio album by Pat Boone
- Released: 1957
- Genre: Pop
- Label: Dot

Pat Boone chronology
| Hymns We Love (1957) | Pat Boone Sings Irving Berlin (1957) | Star Dust (1958) |

Professional ratings
Review scores
| Source | Rating |
|---|---|
| AllMusic | 4.5/5 stars |

Pat Boone Sings Irving Berlin is the fifth studio album by Pat Boone, released in 1957 on Dot Records. It is also his first cover album dedicated to a specific artist (Irving Berlin).

Irving Berlin said of the album: "Pat Boone sings these ballads the way I like to hear them sung."

== Track listing ==
Side one
| No. | Title | Length |
|---|---|---|
| 1. | "All Alone" | 2:12 |
| 2. | "How Deep Is the Ocean" | 2:58 |
| 3. | "Say It with Music" | 2:15 |
| 4. | "Always" | 2:11 |
| 5. | "Be Careful It's My Heart" | 2:16 |
| 6. | "Soft Lights and Sweet Music" | 2:07 |
| 7. | "Remember" | 2:28 |

Side two
| No. | Title | Length |
|---|---|---|
| 1. | "A Pretty Girl Is Like a Melody" | 2:26 |
| 2. | "What'll I Do" | 2:20 |
| 3. | "All By Myself" | 2:28 |
| 4. | "The Girl That I Marry" | 2:12 |
| 5. | "Say It Isn't So" | 2:26 |
| 6. | "They Say It's Wonderful" | 2:37 |
| 7. | "Count Your Blessings" | 2:15 |
