= Yes Indeed! (Pat Boone album) =

Studio album by Pat Boone
- Released: 1958
- Label: Dot

Pat Boone chronology
| Star Dust (1958) | Yes Indeed! (1958) | Tenderly (1959) |

Professional ratings
Review scores
| Source | Rating |
|---|---|
| AllMusic | 4.5/5 stars |

Yes Indeed! is the seventh album by Pat Boone on Dot Records, released in 1958. The album was a commercial success.

== Track listing ==
1. "Yes, Indeed!" (Sy Oliver)
2. "Lazy River" (Sidney Arodin, Hoagy Carmichael)
3. "Sweet Sue, Just You" (Will J. Harris, Victor Young)
4. "They Can't Take That Away from Me" (George Gershwin, Ira Gershwin)
5. "My Baby Just Cares for Me" (Walter Donaldson, Gus Kahn)
6. "Don't Worry 'bout Me" (Rube Bloom, Ted Koehler)
7. "Lonesome Road" (Gene Austin, Nat Shilkret)
8. "Gone Fishin'" (Charles F. Kenny, Nick A. Kenny)
9. "Sweet Georgia Brown" (Ben Bernie, Kenneth Casey, Maceo Pinkard)
10. "Robins and Roses" (Joe Burke, Edgar Leslie)
11. "I'll Build a Stairway to Paradise" (Buddy DeSylva, George Gershwin, Ira Gershwin)
12. "American Beauty Rose" (Arthur Altman, Redd Evans, Hal David)
13. "I've Heard That Song Before" (Sammy Cahn, Jule Styne)
14. "It's a Pity to Say Goodnight" (Billy Reid)
