= The Golden Era of Country Hits =

Studio album by Pat Boone
- Released: 1965
- Genre: Country
- Label: Dot
- Producer: Randy Wood

Pat Boone chronology
Blest Be the Tie That Binds (1965)	The Golden Era of Country Hits (1965)	My 10th Anniversary with Dot Records (1965)

Professional ratings
Review scores
Source	Rating
AllMusic	2/5 stars
Billboard	positive ("Spotlight" pick)

The Golden Era of Country Hits is the 29th album by Pat Boone, released in 1965 on Dot Records.

== Track listing ==
Side one
No.	Title	Writer(s)	Length
1.	"Roses Are Red"	Byron; Evans
2.	"Wolverton Mountain"	Kilgore; King
3.	"Paper Roses"	Torre; Spielman
4.	"Gone"	Smokey Rogers
5.	"Last Date"	Cramer; Dinglebarry
6.	"Don't Let the Stars Get in Your Eyes"	Slim Willet

Side two
No.	Title	Writer(s)	Length
1.	"Singin' the Blues"	Melvin Endsley
2.	"Ramblin' Rose"	J. Sherman; N. Sherman
3.	"Crazy Arms"	Mooney; Seals
4.	"The End of the World"	Dee; Kent
5.	"To Be Alone"	Billy Vaughn
6.	"I'd Rather Die Young"	Smith; Wood; Vaughn
