= Don't Forbid Me =

Single by Pat Boone

from the album Pat's Great Hits
- A-side: "Anastasia"
- Released: November 1956
- Genre: Pop
- Songwriter(s): Charles Singleton

Pat Boone singles chronology
"Friendly Persuasion" / "Chains of Love" (1956)	"Don't Forbid Me" / "Anastasia" (1956)	"Why Baby Why" (1957)

"Don't Forbid Me" is a popular song by Charles Singleton. Among Singleton's huge number of compositions was "Tryin' to Get to You", which had previously been recorded by Elvis Presley at Sun Records. In 1957, "Don't Forbid Me" was a number 1 hit for Pat Boone, and also peaked at number 10 on the Most Played R&B in Juke Boxes chart.

== Presley connection and version ==
Pat Boone's recording and 1957 hit record though came with a little luck. The demo was first sent to Elvis Presley, who revealed this during the Million Dollar Quartet jam session in December 1956. As he recalled, "Have you heard Pat Boone's new record, called 'Don't Forbid Me'? It was written for me, it was sent to me, it stayed over at my house for 'bout ages, man I never did even see it. Too much junk around." Presley then took the acoustic guitar he was playing and ran down a couple of terrific versions by himself to demonstrate to the others how he might have done it. It would remain lost with the other Sun Records tapes of that magical session for the next 24 years.

== The Beatles and Bert Kaempfert cover versions ==
According to eminent author Mark Lewisohn in "The Complete Beatles Chronicles" (p. 362), The Beatles performed Don't Forbid Me on stage from at least 1960 and through 1961, which would have been in Liverpool and Hamburg, with Paul McCartney on lead vocal, but no recording is known to survive. However, their performance of it on stage in Hamburg is probably where big-band conductor, arranger, writer and producer Bert Kaempfert heard the song, as he had previously never covered a single rock song of any sort for his instrumental records. Thus, in 1961 the celebrated Kaempfert recorded a version of the song for his instrumental album, The Wonderland of Bert Kaempfert. Kaempfert also signed The Beatles to record for Polydor, backing their friend — and almost Beatle — Tony Sheridan.
