= Texas Woman =

Studio album by Pat Boone
- Released: 1976
- Genre: Country
- Label: Hitsville / Motown
- Producer: Ray Ruff, Mike Curb

Pat Boone chronology
Something Supernatural (1975)	Texas Woman (1976)	The Country Side of Pat Boone (1977)

Professional ratings
Review scores
Source	Rating
AllMusic	1.5/5 stars
The Rolling Stone Record Guide	2/5 stars

Texas Woman is a country album by Pat Boone, released in 1976 on Motown's sublabel Hitsville.

It was the first of two albums Boone recorded for Motown's Nashville division in the second half of the 1970s.

== Track listing ==
Side one
No.	Title	Writer(s)	Length
1.	"Texas Woman"	Bob Duncan; Steve Stone	2:45
2.	"Throw It Away"	Rafe Vanhoy; Curly Putman	2:30
3.	"Indiana Girl"	Marty Cooper	3:11
4.	"It's Gone"	Oskar Solomon	3:35
5.	"Country Days and Country Nights"	Lee Dresser	1:59

Side two
No.	Title	Writer(s)	Length
1.	"Oklahoma Sunshine"	Mike Settle	2:28
2.	"Don't Want to Fall Away from You"	Keith Green	2:42
3.	"Won't Be Home Tonight"	Pat Boone	3:33
4.	"Young Girl"	Pat Boone	3:20
5.	"Lovelight Comes A Shining"	Oskar Solomon	2:14
