= Hymns We Love =

Studio album by Pat Boone
- Released: 1957
- Genre: Gospel
- Label: Dot

Pat Boone chronology
"Pat" (1957)	Hymns We Love (1957)	Pat Boone Sings Irving Berlin (1957)

Professional ratings
Review scores
Source	Rating
AllMusic	2/5 stars

Hymns We Love is the fourth studio album and first gospel album by Pat Boone. It was released in 1957 on Dot Records.

== Chart performance ==
The album peaked at No. 21 on the Billboard Best Selling Pop LP's, during a four-week run on the chart.

== Track listing ==
Side one
No.	Title	Writer(s)	Length
1.	"The Old Rugged Cross"	Rev. George Bennard	2:46
2.	"It Is No Secret"	Stuart Hamblen	2:25
3.	"Whispering Hope"	Alice Hawthorne	2:30
4.	"Sweet Hour of Prayer"		2:52
5.	"My God Is Real (Yes, He Is Real)"		1:54
6.	"Beyond the Sunset"	Virgil P. Brock, Blanche Kerr Brock	2:25

Side two
No.	Title	Writer(s)	Length
1.	"In the Garden"	C. Austin Miles	2:48
2.	"Softly and Tenderly"		2:28
3.	"Will the Circle Be Unbroken"		2:14
4.	"Yield Not to Temptation"		2:42
5.	"Have Thine Own Way, Lord"	George Stebbins, Adelaide Pollard	2:23
6.	"Now the Day Is Over"		2:12

== Charts ==
Chart (1957)	Peak position
US Billboard Best Selling Pop LP's	21
