= Wish You Were Here, Buddy (album) =

Studio album by Pat Boone
- Released: 1966
- Genre: Pop
- Label: Dot
- Producer: Randy Wood, Nick Venet

Pat Boone chronology
Memories (1965)	Wish You Were Here, Buddy (1966)	Christmas Is A Comin' (1966)

Professional ratings
Review scores
Source	Rating
AllMusic	3/5 stars
Billboard	"Spotlight" pick

Wish You Were Here, Buddy is the 34th studio album by Pat Boone, released in 1966 on Dot Records.

Billboard picked the album for its "Spotlight" section.

== Track listing ==
Side one
No.	Title	Writer(s)	Length
1.	"Wish You Were Here, Buddy"	Pat Boone
2.	"You Win Again"	Hank Williams
3.	"Five Miles from Home"	Mickey Newberry
4.	"Me"	Pat Boone
5.	"Don't Let the Blues Make You Bad"	Billy Mize
6.	"A Million and One"	Yvonne Devaney

Side two
No.	Title	Writer(s)	Length
1.	"Someone Before Me"	Bob Hicks
2.	"Just a Little Bit of Rain"	Fred Neil
3.	"Lyin' Woman"	Jimmie Rodgers
4.	"You Ain't No Better than Me"	Powell; Walker
5.	"You Don't Need Me Anymore"	Robertson; Blair
