= Pictures in the Fire =

- Japan picture sleeve

Single by Pat Boone

from the album I'll See You in My Dreams
- A-side: "I'll See You in My Dreams"
- Released: 1961
- Recorded: 1961
- Genre: Pop
- Length: 2:24
- Label: Dot
- Songwriter(s): Lenore Rosenblatt; Martin Kalmanoff
- Producer(s): Randy Wood

Pat Boone singles chronology
"Just Let Me Dream" (1961)	"Pictures in the Fire" / "Little Honda" (1961)	"I'll See You in My Dreams" / "Willing and Eage" (1962)

"Pictures in the Fire" is a song by Pat Boone that reached number 77 on the Billboard Hot 100 in 1962.

== Track listing ==
7" single (Dot 16312, 1961)
No.	Title	Writer(s)	Length
1.	"I'll See You in My Dreams"	Jones; Kahn	2:35
2.	"Pictures in the Fire"	Rosenblatt; Kalmanoff	2:24

== Charts ==
Chart (1962)	Peak position
US Billboard Hot 100	77
US Adult Contemporary (Billboard)	15
