= Charles Kenny =

American songwriter

- Born: Charles Francis Kenny; June 23, 1898; Astoria, New York, United States
- Died: January 20, 1992 Eatontown, New Jersey, United States
- Occupations: Composer, author, violinist

Charles Francis Kenny (June 23, 1898 – January 20, 1992) was an American composer, lyricist, author, and violinist.

He was born in Astoria, New York.

His hit songs include "There's a Gold Mine in the Sky", "Love Letters in the Sand", "Laughing at Life", and "Because It's Your Birthday Today", all of which were written with his poet brother Nick Kenny. Nick and Charles together were a partnership that were credited on many song lyrics even though Nick alone contributed the lyrics.

In the 1920s, Kenny wrote music for Cecyl Grimes' Children's Playhouse and for radio scripts on WHN. He helped produce his brother's show Nick Kenny Children's Show on WMCA, Arthur Anderson was one performer. The Kenny brothers would financially exploit the child talent, making them perform at gigs around New York City.

He would later become a radio/TV editor at the New York Daily Mirror, where his brother was a columnist.

He lived in Easton, CT. He was married to actress Joy Hathaway, and they had four children, Charles Francis Jr, John, Kevin, and ZoAnne. ZoAnne died of pneumonia in infancy, and Joy Hathaway died also of pneumonia hours after ZoAnne's burial. In 1958 he married Anna Susannah Mahometa. He died in Eatontown, New Jersey.

== Selected compositions ==
Songs

- "There's a Gold Mine in the Sky" was published in 1937. It charted at No. 1 on Billboard's "Sheet-Music Leaders" chart for the week ending February 5, 1938, selling nearly one million copies for Bourne Music. The song was recorded by Gene Autry (OKeh 03358) and appeared in his 1938 film Gold Mine in the Sky. The song also was recorded by Jimmie Davis (Decca 5473), Pat Boone (Dot 15602) who revisited it soon after reviving their other older song Love Letters In The Sand, Art Kassel (Bluebird B-7257), Johnny Pfander (Damon D-12223), Bing Crosby (on November 12, 1937 - Decca 2678) (see Crosby's Cowboy Songs album) and Kate Smith.
- Love Letters in the Sand, lyrics by Charles and Nick Kenny, music by J. Fred Coots. Pat Boone's recording became a hit record.
- Laughing at Life
- Because it's your Birthday Today. Featured in the Our Gang episode Practical Jokers.
- Nobody Know the Power of Prayer, lyrics by Nick Kenny
- The Old Sailor, lyrics by Nick Kenny
- When You Look in the Heart of a Shamrock, lyrics by Charles and Nick Kenny, music by Abner Silver.
- I'd Like to be a Cow in Switzerland, lyrics by Charles and Nick Kenny, music by Patrick E. Gorman
- Leanin' on the Old Top Rail, by Nick and Charles Kenny
- Casanova Brown, lyrics by Charles and Nick Kenny, music by Abner Silver
- I'm Planting Little Onions So I Can Cry Over You
- Ev'ry Street Is Canal Street in Venice
- Make-Believe Island, lyrics by Nick and Charles Kenny and Sam Caslow, composed by Will Grosz. Was the theme song for the Jan Savitt Orchestra.
- While a Cigarette Was Burning, lyrics by Nick Kenny. This 1938 number became the theme song for the 1944-1949 radio show The Chesterfield Supper Club.
- Scattered Toys, lyrics by Nick Kenny. This song was on the soundtrack of the 1950 Yiddish musical revue film Catskill Honeymoon.
- Gone Fishin', lyrics by Nick Kenny
- And So Little Time, lyrics by Nick Kenny and possibly Charles, music by Abner Silver. Was recorded by Jerry Wayne.
- Cathedral in the Pines, another 1930s song (along with There's a Gold Mine in the Sky) that Pat Boone recorded in 1957 following his success with Love Letters in the Sand
- Last Night, (or Why Couldn't It Last Last Night), which was the theme song for the Joe Venuti Orchestra. Writeen with Austen Croom-Johnson.
- The Moon is a Golden Coin

Other

- With Sword And Song, an operetta in two acts based on the life of Jean Lafitte, by Charles and Nick Kenny
