= "Pat" (album) =

Studio album by Pat Boone
- Released: 1957
- Genre: Pop
- Label: Dot

Pat Boone chronology
Howdy! (1956)	"Pat" (1957)	Hymns We Love (1957)

Professional ratings
Review scores
Source	Rating
AllMusic	2.5/5 stars

"Pat" is the third studio album by Pat Boone, released in 1957 on Dot Records.

== Reception ==
In his retrospective review for AllMusic, Arthur Rowe gave the album 2.5 stars out of 5, opining that it was a "bad album" that might "have gone some distance toward derailing [Pat Boone's] career early on, if he "had not gotten off to a fast start with some good, energy-charged [...] rock & roll and also an excellent [...] album of standards".

== Track listing ==
Side one
No.	Title	Writer(s)	Length
1.	"Flip, Flop and Fly"		2:37
2.	"Pledging My Love"	Don Robey, Ferdinand Washington	2:26
3.	"Money Honey"	Jesse Stone	2:29
4.	"Tomorrow Night"	Sam Coslow, Will Grosz	2:45
5.	"Ain't Nobody Here but Us Chickens"		2:17
6.	"Shake a Hand"	Joe Morris	2:39

Side two
No.	Title	Length
1.	"Honey Hush"	2:10
2.	"Please Send Me Someone to Love"	2:43
3.	"I'm in Love Again"	1:59
4.	"Rock Around the Clock"	2:03
5.	"Shot Gun Boogie"	2:25
6.	"Five, Ten, Fifteen Hours"	2:28
