= Star Dust (Pat Boone album) =

Studio album by Pat Boone
- Released: 1958
- Genre: Pop
- Label: Dot

Pat Boone chronology
Pat Boone Sings Irving Berlin (1957)	Star Dust (1958)	Yes Indeed! (1958)

Star Dust (or Stardust) is the sixth studio album by Pat Boone, released in 1958 on Dot Records.

== Background ==
"Pat Boone's Stardust arrived on the heels of seven consecutive million-selling singles in mid-1958, a year in which no less than eight of his songs would hit the Top 40."

== Overview ==
In the United States, the album reached the top ten on both the Billboard Most Played by Jockeys and Best Selling LP's charts. It reached number ten on the UK albums chart. It was his best charting album in both countries.

== Critical reception ==
Professional ratings
Review scores
Source	Rating
AllMusic	4.5/5 stars

Arthur Rowe on AllMusic wrote: "Boone's voice is strong and crystal-clear, and his confident but never overstated delivery turns a batch of fine standards into pure gems as it brings back the special joy of simply sitting down, listening, and losing oneself in the music."

== Track listing ==
Side one
No.	Title	Length
1.	"Stardust"	3:15
2.	"Blueberry Hill"	2:20
3.	"Ebb Tide"	2:40
4.	"Little White Lies"	1:55
5.	"To Each His Own"	2:34
6.	"Cold, Cold Heart"	2:07
7.	"Deep Purple"	2:50

Side two
No.	Title	Length
1.	"Autumn Leaves"	2:00
2.	"St. Louis Blues"	2:22
3.	"Solitude"	2:55
4.	"Anniversary Song"	3:15
5.	"Heartaches"	2:09
6.	"I'll Walk Alone"	2:47
7.	"September Song"	3:00

== Charts ==
Chart (1965)	Peak position
US Best Selling LP's (Billboard)	6
UK Top LPs	10
