= Tenderly (Pat Boone album) =

Studio album by Pat Boone
- Released: 1959
- Genre: Pop
- Label: Dot

Pat Boone chronology
Yes Indeed! (1958)	Tenderly (1959)	Side by Side (with Shirley Boone) (1959)

Professional ratings
Review scores
Source	Rating
AllMusic	4.5/5 stars
Billboard	"Showcase" pick

Tenderly is the eighth studio album by Pat Boone, released in 1959 on Dot Records.

== Chart performance ==
The album peaked at No. 17 on the Billboard Best Selling Monophonic LP's chart, during an eleven-week run on the chart.

== Track listing ==
Side one
No.	Title	Length
1.	"Tenderly"	3:12
2.	"True Love"	2:40
3.	"Maybe You'll Be There"	2:54
4.	"Why Don't You Believe Me"	2:55
5.	"You Belong to Me"	2:45
6.	"Because of You"	2:24

Side two
No.	Title	Length
1.	"Secret Love"	2:30
2.	"Fascination"	2:34
3.	"How Soon"	2:27
4.	"I'm in the Mood for Love"	3:03
5.	"More Than You Know"	3:09
6.	"The Nearness of You"	3:27

== Charts ==
Chart (1959)	Peak position
US Billboard Best Selling Monophonic LP's	17
