= Boss Beat! =

Studio album by Pat Boone
- Released: 1964
- Genre: Pop
- Label: Dot

Pat Boone chronology
The Lord's Prayer and Other Great Hymns (1964)	Boss Beat! (1964)	Near You (1964)

Professional ratings
Review scores
Source	Rating
AllMusic	4/5 stars
Billboard	"Special merit" pick

Boss Beat! is the 26th studio album by Pat Boone, released in 1964 on Dot Records.

== Track listing ==
Side one
No.	Title	Writer(s)	Length
1.	"Memphis"	Chuck Berry	2:34
2.	"I Want to Hold Your Hand"	Lennon; McCartney	2:14
3.	"Raindrops"	D. Clark	2:28
4.	"The Loco-motion"	Goffin; King	2:04
5.	"Kansas City"	Stoller; Leiber	2:08
6.	"Hey Baby"	Cobb; Channel	2:26

Side two
No.	Title	Writer(s)	Length
1.	"Walk Right In"	Cannon; Woods	2:12
2.	"Sweet Little Sixteen"	Chuck Berry	2:34
3.	"Mashed Potato Time"	Mann; Lowe	2:23
4.	"Searchin'"	Leiber; Stoller	2:52
5.	"Way Down Yonder in New Orleans"	Creamer; Layton	1:47
6.	"Our Day Will Come"	Hilliard; Garson	2:01
