= I Was Kaiser Bill's Batman (album) =

I Was Kaiser Bill's Batman with Pat Boone Whistling Plus Nine Vocal Performances

Studio album by Pat Boone
- Released: 1967
- Genre: Pop
- Label: Dot

Pat Boone chronology
How Great Thou Art (1967)	I Was Kaiser Bill's Batman with Pat Boone Whistling Plus Nine Vocal Performances (1967)	Look Ahead (1968)

Professional ratings
Review scores
Source	Rating
AllMusic	2/5 stars
Billboard	positive ("Spotlight" pick)

I Was Kaiser Bill's Batman with Pat Boone Whistling Plus Nine Vocal Performances is the 37th studio album by Pat Boone, released in 1967 on Dot Records.

Billboard picked the album for its "Spotlight" section.

== Track listing ==
Side one
No.	Title	Writer(s)	Length
1.	"I Was Kaiser Bill's Batman"	Cook; Greenaway
2.	"What If They Gave a War and No One Came"
3.	"I'll Find You"
4.	"Childhood Sweethearts"
5.	"A Well Remembered, Highly Thought of Love Affair"

Side two
No.	Title	Writer(s)	Length
1.	"My Cup Runneth Over"	Jones; Schmidt
2.	"It's Not Time Now"
3.	"Tiffany Rings"
4.	"Goin' to Frisco"
5.	"Workin' It Out"
