= Look Ahead (Pat Boone album) =

Studio album by Pat Boone
- Released: 1968
- Genre: Country
- Label: Dot

Pat Boone chronology
I Was Kaiser Bill's Batman (1967)	Look Ahead (1968)	Departure (1969)

Professional ratings
Review scores
Source	Rating
AllMusic	4.5/5 stars

Look Ahead is the 38th studio album by Pat Boone, released in 1968 on Dot Records. It became his last album for the label. The album mainly contains covers of country and western songs of the time.

== Track listing ==
Side one
No.	Title	Writer(s)	Length
1.	"Gonna Find Me a Bluebird"	Marvin Rainwater	3:12
2.	"I Just Said Goodbye to My Dreams"	Leon Payne	3:10
3.	"Love of the Common People"	Hurley; Wilkins	2:50
4.	"Take These Chains from My Heart"	Fred Rose; Heath	3:01
5.	"The Day After Forever"	Ben Peters	2:30
6.	"Too Soon to Know"		2:32

Side two
No.	Title	Writer(s)	Length
1.	"Kaw-Liga"	Williams; Rose	2:59
2.	"Deafening Roar of Silence"	Wayne Carson Thompson	2:36
3.	"More and More"	Pierce; Kilgore	2:15
4.	"Baby"	Ray Griff	3:16
5.	"I Feel like Cryin'"	Red West	2:30
6.	"Help Me Love You"	J. Tuttle	2:13
