= Ten Lonely Guys =

Single by Pat Boone
- B-side: "Lover's Lane"
- Released: 1962
- Genre: Pop
- Length: 3:38
- Label: Dot
- Songwriter(s): Bob Feldman; Jerry Goldstein; Richard Gottehrer; Bob Elgin; Kay Rogers; Lockie Edwards, Jr.; Larry Weiss; Cliff Adams; Wes Farrell; Mark Lewis

Pat Boone singles chronology
| "Speedy Gonzales" (1962) | "Ten Lonely Guys" (1962) | "The Main Attraction" (1962) |

"Ten Lonely Guys" is a song by Pat Boone that reached number 45 on the Billboard Hot 100 in 1962.

== Track listing ==
7" single (Dot 45-16391, 1962)
| No. | Title | Length |
|---|---|---|
| 1. | "Ten Lonely Guys" | 3:38 |
| 2. | "Lover's Lane" | 2:14 |

== Charts ==
| Chart (1962) | Peak position |
|---|---|
| US Billboard Hot 100 | 45 |
| US Adult Contemporary (Billboard) | 14 |
