= St. Therese of the Roses =

"St. Therese Of The Roses" is a 1956 popular song written by Remus Harris and Arthur Strauss. The song takes the form of a prayer to St. Therese of the rose (Saint Thérèse of Lisieux), by a man who is about to marry asking the saint for her to send her blessings to himself and his sweetheart, so they will have a happy and loving marriage.

A version performed by Billy Ward and His Dominoes was recorded on 18 April 1956, and issued in June of that year on the Decca label (Catalogue No. 29933). In the United States the song reached number 27 on the Billboard Hot 100 in the summer of 1956.

In the United Kingdom, a version was recorded by the singer Malcolm Vaughan and reached number 3 on the UK Singles Chart. Its success was helped following a controversy involving the BBC when, in October 1956 Vaughan had been scheduled to appear on BBC TV's Off The Record to promote the release of the song, but had the invitation withdrawn after a BBC committee decided that it was unsuitable for broadcast. The reason given was that "the lyric is contrary both to Roman Catholic doctrine and to Protestant sentiment." The resulting controversy coupled with airplay on Radio Luxembourg ensured the record's success. As well as peaking at number 3, it stayed in the charts for five months and ultimately sold half a million copies.

== See also ==
- List of songs banned by the BBC
