= Near You (album) =

Studio album by Pat Boone
- Released: 1964
- Genre: Pop
- Length: 32 minutes 13 seconds
- Label: Dot

Pat Boone chronology
Boss Beat! (1964)	Near You (1964)	Blest Be the Tie That Binds (1965)

Professional ratings
Review scores
Source	Rating
AllMusic	1.5/5 stars

Near You is the 27th studio album by Pat Boone. It was released in 1964 on Dot Records.

== Critical reception ==
In his retrospective review for AllMusic, Arthur Rowe gave the album 1.5 stars out of 5. He found the album "most forgettable", blaming the failure on Boone's "uninspired singing" and also on the "lifeless arrangements which are entirely unsuited to Boone's natural lilting and spirited style".

== Track listing ==
Side one
No.	Title	Writer(s)	Length
1.	"Near You"	Craig; Goell	2:27
2.	"Twilight Time"	Buck Ram - Morty & Al Nevins - Artie Dunn	2:27
3.	"It Isn't Fair"	Richard Himber - Frank Warshauer - Sylvester Sprigato	2:43
4.	"Canadian Sunset"	Gimbel; Heywood	2:35
5.	"When I Fall in Love"	Heyman; Young	2:46
6.	"Love, Who Needs It?"	Boone; Isaacs	2:47

Side two
No.	Title	Writer(s)	Length
1.	"Love Letters"	Heyman; Young	3:14
2.	"My Prayer"	Kennedy; Boulanger	2:54
3.	"Blue Velvet"	Wayne; Morris	2:41
4.	"Shangri-La"	Matty Malneck - Robert Maxwell - Carl Sigman	2:42
5.	"You'll Never Know"	Gordon; Warren	2:38
6.	"More"	Newell; Oliviero; Ortolani	2:14
