= My 10th Anniversary with Dot Records =

Studio album by Pat Boone
- Released: 1965
- Genre: Pop
- Label: Dot
- Producer: Randy Wood

Pat Boone chronology
The Golden Era of Country Hits (1965)	My 10th Anniversary with Dot Records (1965)	Pat Boone Sings Winners of the Reader's Digest Poll (1965)

Professional ratings
Review scores
Source	Rating
AllMusic	2/5 stars
Billboard	positive ("Spotlight" pick)

My 10th Anniversary with Dot Records is the 30th album by Pat Boone, released in 1965 on Dot Records.

== Track listing ==
Side one
No.	Title	Writer(s)	Length
1.	"With My Eyes Wide Open I'm Dreaming"	Gordon; Revel	2:25
2.	"Red Roses for a Blue Lady"	Bennett; Tepper	2:25
3.	"Maybe"	Flynn; Madden	2:53
4.	"Release Me"	Miller; Stevenson	3:03
5.	"Willow Weep for Me"	Ann Ronell	2:25
6.	"Dear Heart"	Livingston; Evans; Mancini	2:34

Side two
No.	Title	Writer(s)	Length
1.	"(It's No) Sin"	Shull; Hoven	2:15
2.	"Pass Me By"	Leigh; Coleman	2:23
3.	"My Love, Forgive Me"	Lee; Pallavicini; Mescoli	2:25
4.	"When Did You Leave Heaven"	Whiting; Bullock	2:17
5.	"The Girl from Ipanema"	Jobim; Gimbel; DeMoraes	2:46
6.	"Pearly Shells"	Edwards; Pober	2:50
