= I'll See You in My Dreams (Pat Boone album) =

Studio album by Pat Boone
- Released: 1962
- Genre: Pop
- Label: Dot

Pat Boone chronology
My God and I (1961)	I'll See You in My Dreams (1962)	Pat Boone Reads from the Holy Bible (1962)

Professional ratings
Review scores
Source	Rating
AllMusic	4/5 stars
Billboard	positive ("Spotlight" pick)

I'll See You in My Dreams is the sixteenth studio album by Pat Boone, released in 1962 on Dot Records.

== Track listing ==
Side one
No.	Title	Length
1.	"I'll See You In My Dreams"	2:45
2.	"Peg o' My Heart"	2:21
3.	"Tammy"	2:33
4.	"My Blue Heaven"	2:19
5.	"Tennessee Waltz"	1:59
6.	"Pictures in the Fire"	2:23

Side two
No.	Title	Writer(s)	Length
1.	"That Old Black Magic"		3:00
2.	"Alone"		2:34
3.	"Brazil"		2:19
4.	"Prisoner of Love"		3:14
5.	"The Gypsy"	Billy Reid	3:03
6.	"Paper Doll"	Johnny S. Black	1:50
