= Marty Cooper (musician) =

American singer-songwriter

- Born: Martin James Cooper; March 12, 1946 (age 80); Denver, Colorado, United States
- Genre: Country
- Occupation: Singer-songwriter
- Instrument: Guitar

Martin James "Marty" Cooper (born March 12, 1946) is an American singer-songwriter whose musical style is described as soft rock country. Cooper has written songs such as "Peanut Butter" by The Marathons, "A Little Bit Country, A Little Bit Rock 'N Roll" which was first made famous by Donny and Marie, and "Hey, Harmonica Man" made famous by Stevie Wonder. Cooper's first album, A Minute Of Your Time, was released in 1972. He released his second commercial album in 1979 with EMI and it was only released in Europe. In Germany it was entitled "If You Were A Singer" and "A Little Bit Country, A Bit Rock 'N Roll" in Scandinavia. In 2012, two albums were released independently, American Dreamers Collection and I Wrote A Song.

== Early life ==
Cooper was born in Denver, Colorado, to Dr. Henry Lewis Cooper and Helen (née Ratner) Cooper. His father was enlisted in the Army Air Corps during the beginning of World War II and was commissioned a major. During that time the family moved to Pendleton, Oregon, Albuquerque, New Mexico and Santa Monica, California. By the time Cooper returned to Denver, he had attended five different primary schools. After Cooper's father died when Cooper was 12, he moved to California, where he became interested in songwriting.

== Early commercial success ==
Cooper's first album in 1972, A Minute Of Your Time, was released on Andy Williams' Barnaby label. Cooper has said about the experience, "Ken Mansfield had done an album with Rick Cunha, my friend from the group Hearts & Flowers. Ken had just gotten his job at Barnaby. I showed him what I was doing and he gave me my opportunity to be a recording artist. He let me pick the songs and we produced the album together." Due to the commercial success and airplay from A Minute Of Your Time, Cooper was contacted by ad agencies to write, sing and produce music for TV and radio commercials. Clients during that time included Olympia Beer, Alhambra Water, and Crystal Water.

== The Shacklefords & Jack Nitzsche ==
Cooper was close friends with Jack Nitzsche and partnered on several projects. Cooper co-wrote and produced Nitzsche's Lonely Surfer album of 1963. That same year Cooper teamed up with Lee Hazlewood, Gracia Nitzche, and Daniel Stone to form the group The Shacklefords. A cover of The Shacklefords' song The Biplane, Evermore by The Irish Rovers reached #50 in Canada.

== Discography ==
=== Singles ===
- 1958 - "Can't Walk ‘Em Off" b/w "You Bet Your Little Life" - CREST 1043
