= April Love (song) =

Single by Pat Boone

from the album Pat Boone Sings
- B-side: "When the Swallows Come Back to Capistrano"
- Released: October 1957
- Recorded: September 15, 1957
- Studio: Radio Recorders, Hollywood, California, U.S.
- Genre: Pop
- Length: 2:39
- Label: Dot
- Composer: Sammy Fain
- Lyricist: Paul Francis Webster

Pat Boone singles chronology
"There's a Gold Mine in the Sky" / "Remember You're Mine" (1957)	"April Love" (1957)	"A Wonderful Time Up There" (1958)

"April Love" is a popular song with music by Sammy Fain and lyrics by Paul Francis Webster. It was written as the theme song for a 1957 film of the same name starring Pat Boone and Shirley Jones and directed by Henry Levin.

Helped by the release of the film, "April Love" became a number-one hit in the United States for Pat Boone, and spent twenty-six weeks on the US pop charts (it spent 6 weeks at number 1). In 1958, it was nominated for an Oscar for Best Music, Original Song but lost out to “All the Way”.

== Other recordings ==
- Connie Francis - for One for the Boys.
- Jane Morgan - included in the album Jane Morgan Sings the Great Golden Hits (1961).
- Johnny Mathis - Tender Is the Night (1964)
- Billy Vaughn
- Artie Malvin with Jimmy Carroll & His Orchestra - Bell BS-128 (1957, Australia)

== See also ==
- List of number-one singles of 1957 (U.S.)
- List of number-one singles in Australia during the 1950s
