= American Glory (album) =

Studio album by Pat Boone
- Released: 2002
- Label: The Gold Label

Pat Boone chronology
The Miracle of Christmas (2000)	American Glory (2002)	Nearer My God to Thee (2005)

American Glory is the 71st album of patriotic songs by Pat Boone issued post 9/11, in 2002. The album was the biggest seller in Boone's in house label, The Gold Label's history. The new song, "Under God," defended the use of those words in the Pledge of Allegiance.
