= Four by Pat =

EP by Pat Boone
- Released: 1957
- Length: 8:38
- Label: Dot

Audio
- "Technique" on YouTube

Four by Pat is an EP by Pat Boone, released in 1957 on Dot Records.

It contained four songs: "Technique", "Cathedral in the Pines", "Louella", and "Without My Love".

In October–November 1957, the EP spent several weeks at number 2 of the Billboard's Best Selling Pop EP's chart^{[A]}, only prevented from topping the chart by Elvis Presley's Loving You.

It also charted on Billboard's Best Played by Jockeys chart and in September, before the addition of a separate EPs chart, it had charted at least as high as number 12 on the combined Best Selling Pop Albums chart.

== Track listing ==
7-inch EP (Dot DEP-1057, 1957)
No.	Title	Length
1.	"Technique"	2:27
2.	"Cathedral in the Pines"	2:11
3.	"Louella"	1:39
4.	"Without My Love"	2:21

== Charts ==
Chart (1957)	Peak position
Billboard Best Selling EP's	2

=== Year-end charts ===
Chart (1958)	Peak position
Billboard Best Selling EP's	15

== Notes ==
1. ^[A] Published from October 7, 1957
