= Remember You're Mine =

Single by Pat Boone

from the album Pat's Great Hits
- A-side: "There's a Gold Mine in the Sky"
- Released: July 1957
- Genre: Rock and roll
- Length: 2:14
- Label: Dot
- Songwriters: Bernie Lowe, Kal Mann
- Producer: Randy Wood

Pat Boone singles chronology
| "Love Letters in the Sand" (1957) | "Remember You're Mine" (1957) | "April Love" (1957) |

"Remember You're Mine" is a song written by Bernie Lowe and Kal Mann and performed by Pat Boone. It reached #5 on the UK Singles Chart and #6 on the U.S. pop chart in 1957.

Billy Vaughn conducted the music on the song and it was produced by Randy Wood.

== Other versions ==
- Dee Dee Sharp released a version of the song on her 1962 album, It's Mashed Potato Time.
