= There's a Gold Mine in the Sky =

Song
- Language: English
- Published: 1937
- Released: 1937
- Songwriters: Charles Kenny, Nick Kenny

"There's a Gold Mine in the Sky"

Single by Pat Boone

from the album Pat's Great Hits
- B-side: "Remember You're Mine"
- Released: July 1957
- Label: Dot

Pat Boone singles chronology
"Love Letters in the Sand" (1957)	"There's a Gold Mine in the Sky" (1957)	"April Love" (1957)

"There's a Gold Mine in the Sky" is a popular song first published in 1937. It was written by Charles Kenny and Nick Kenny. It charted at #1 on the "Sheet-Music Leaders" Chart in Billboard Magazine issued February 12, 1938, for the week ending February 5, 1938.

Artists that have recorded this song include Gene Autry (OKeh 03358), Jimmie Davis (Decca 5473), Pat Boone (Dot 15602), Art Kassel (Bluebird B-7257), Johnny Pfander (Damon D-12223), Bing Crosby (Decca 2678) (see Cowboy Songs (Bing Crosby album)), and Kate Smith.

The song was featured on the soundtrack to the 1938 film Gold Mine in the Sky, where it was performed by Gene Autry and Cowhands.

== Charts ==
Bing Crosby (w/ Eddie Dunstedter) version

Chart (1938)	Peak position
US Billboard	6

Pat Boone version

Chart (1957)	Peak position
US Billboard	14
US Cash Box	15
