= Why Baby Why (Pat Boone song) =

Single by Pat Boone

from the album Pat's Great Hits
- B-side: "I'm Waiting Just for You"
- Released: February 1957
- Genre: Pop
- Length: 1:57
- Label: Dot
- Songwriter(s): Larry Harrison, Luther Dixon

Pat Boone singles chronology
"Don't Forbid Me" (1956)	"Why Baby Why" (1957)	"Love Letters in the Sand" (1957)

"Why Baby Why" is a song written by Larry Harrison and Luther Dixon and performed by Pat Boone. It reached #5 on the U.S. pop chart and #17 on the UK Singles Chart in 1957.

The single was produced by Randy Wood and arranged by Billy Vaughn.

== Other versions ==
- P. J. Proby released a version of the song on his 1968 album What's Wrong with My World. It was produced by Bob Reisdorff and Les Reed.
