= Love Letters in the Sand =

1931 popular song, a hit for Pat Boone

Song
- Published: 1931
- Released: 1931
- Composer: J. Fred Coots
- Lyricists: Nick Kenny, Charles Kenny

"Love Letters in the Sand" is a popular song first published in 1931.

== Overview ==
It began life as a poem by Nick Kenny. J. Fred Coots read the poem in the New York Daily Mirror, and obtained Kenny's permission to set the poem to music. He went through 4 different melodies before settling on the published version known today. The melody bears similarity to the 1881 song The Spanish Cavalier. Lyrics were credited to both Nick Kenny and his brother Charles Kenny.

The song was first recorded on 26 August 1931, as a "vocal chorus" sung by Helen Rowland within a foxtrot played by the Majestic Dance Orchestra. George Hall popularized the song on his radio show, later making it his theme song. Ted Black and His Orchestra, with vocalist Tom Brown, had the first major hit recording of the song in 1931. Pat Boone had a major hit with the song in 1957.

The melody has been used for songs in at least eight other languages.

== Pat Boone version ==
"Love Letters in the Sand"

Single by Pat Boone

from the album Pat's Great Hits
- A-side: "Bernardine"
- Released: April 1957
- Recorded: 1957
- Genre: Traditional pop
- Length: 2:16
- Label: Dot
- Songwriters: J. Fred Coots, Nick Kenny and Charles Kenny
- Producer: Billy Vaughn

Pat Boone singles chronology
"Why Baby Why" (1957)	"Love Letters in the Sand" (1957)	"There's a Gold Mine in the Sky" / "Remember You're Mine" (1957)

Pat Boone's version became a major hit in June and July 1957, spending 5 weeks at number one on the Billboard Top 100, with 34 weeks in total on the chart. Billboard ranked it as the No. 2 song for 1957. In Canada, the song spent two weeks at number one. The song was used in Boone's 1957 film Bernardine. Boone did the whistling in the instrumental portion of the song as well. The song originally had a short instrumental introduction, but most versions begin with Boone's voice.

=== Charts ===
Chart (1957)	Peak position
Australia	1
Belgium (Ultratop 50 Flanders)	2
Belgium (Ultratop 50 Wallonia)	5
Canada (CHUM Hit Parade)	1
Netherlands (Single Top 100)	1
UK Singles (Official Charts)	2
US Billboard Top 100	1
US Cash Box Top 100	1

== Other versions ==
- In 1931, the song was recorded separately by Gene Austin, Lee Morse, and American dance band Ted Black and His Orchestra, with "Vocal refrain by Tom Brown".
- Kenneth W. Griffin also released an organ discography in 1957, featuring the song, in his album, "Love Letters in the Sand".
- Johnny Dorelli recorded a Jazz version on his 1957 album “Dance With...”
- Patsy Cline and The Jordanaires released a single version and was included in the compilation album "Sweet Dreams: Her Complete Decca Masters (1960-1963)"
- Bob Eberly released a version on his Spanish-oriented album Bob Eberly Con Enoch Light Y Su Orquesta in 1957, sung in English but subtitled Cartas De Amor En La Arena.
- The Norman Petty Trio released a recording on Columbia in 1958.
- Andy Williams released a version on his 1959 album, Two Time Winners.
- Bill Haley and His Comets recorded a version on the 1960 covers album Bill Haley and His Comets.
- Leroy Van Dyke released a version on his 1961 album, Movin' Van Dyke.
- Sonny James on his 1964 album You're the Only World I Know which reached No. 2 on the US Country charts.
- The English singer, Vince Hill, reached No. 23 in the UK Singles Chart in 1967, with his cover version of the track.
- Marie Osmond on her 1975 album Who's Sorry Now which reached No. 20 on the US Country charts.
- Tom T. Hall's version reached No. 79 on the U.S. Country chart in 1986.
- Little Willie Littlefield recorded a version for his 1990 album Singalong with Little Willie Littlefield.
- Sixpence None the Richer recorded a version for their 1996 album Tickets for a Prayer Wheel.

== See also ==
- List of number-one singles in Australia during the 1950s
- List of Top 25 singles for 1957 in Australia
- List of Billboard number-one singles of 1957
- Billboard year-end top 50 singles of 1957
- List of Cash Box Best Sellers number-one singles of 1957
- List of CHUM number-one singles of 1957
