= Wish You Were Here, Buddy (song) =

Single by Pat Boone
- B-side: "Love for Love"
- Released: 1966
- Recorded: 1966
- Genre: Pop
- Length: 1:58
- Label: Dot
- Songwriter: Pat Boone
- Producers: Nick Venet, Randy Wood

Pat Boone singles chronology
"It Seems Like Yesterday" (1966)	"Wish You Were Here, Buddy" (1966)	"Hurry Sundown" (1967)

"Wish You Were Here, Buddy" is a song written and originally recorded by Pat Boone. Released as a single, it peaked at number 49 on the US Billboard Hot 100.

== Track listing ==
7" single (1966)

1. "Wish You Were Here, Buddy" (1:58)
2. "Love for Love" (2:35)

== Charts ==
Chart (1966)	Peak position
US Billboard Hot 100	49
US Adult Contemporary (Billboard)	12
