= Nick Kenny (poet) =

American poet

Nick Kenny's poem, "Pirate's Moon", illustrated by Richard Bassford

Nicholas Aloysius Kenny (February 3, 1895 in Astoria, New York - December 1, 1975 in Sarasota, Florida) was a syndicated newspaper columnist, a song lyricist and a poet who wrote light verse in the Edgar Guest tradition.

== Biography ==
Born in Queens, Kenny attended high school for only three months before joining the Navy (1911–18), serving on the USS Arizona, followed by a tour of duty in the Merchant Marine (1918–20). He enlisted in the navy in April 1917 and was discharged in November 1918 as a Yeoman 2nd Class. He continued his education with extensive reading in ships' libraries. He began writing poetry but did not sign his poems until one was published in Arthur Brisbane's column.

While a sportswriter and rewrite man at the Bayonne Times (1920–23), he wrote his first column, "Getting an Earful" (later collected in a 1932 book). After a brief period at the Boston American (1923–24), Kenny moved on to the New York Journal (1924–27) and the New York Daily News (1927–30). He was the radio editor at the New York Daily Mirror, and in 1930, he began writing "Nick Kenny Speaking," a column combining verse, jokes and observational humor with his commentary on current radio programs. The popularity of the column kept him at the New York Daily Mirror until that paper shut down in 1963. At that point, he moved to Sarasota, Florida where he wrote a column for the Sarasota Herald Tribune until his death.

When the USS Arizona went down at Pearl Harbor, one of Kenny's poems was on the ship's bulletin board. Kenny is mainly remembered today as the lyricist of the 1931 popular song standard, "Love Letters in the Sand", a 1957 gold record hit for Pat Boone. Kenny's next big success, "Gold Mine in the Sky," inspired the Gene Autry movie, Gold Mine in the Sky (1938) and enabled Kenny and his brother Charles to launch their own music firm, Gold Mine in the Sky Publishing Company. His songs included "Gone Fishin'" and "Scattered Toys" recorded by The Three Suns, which has lyrics somewhat similar to one of his "Patty Poems".

During the mid-1930s he was the host of The Nick Kenny Radio Hour which sometimes featured the song-and-dance team of Jacqueline and William Daniels (who grew up to become the Screen Actors Guild President in 1999–2001). In 1934, the Three X Sisters, a popular radio harmony trio were part of his "Radio Scandal's" scripted radio act. Delores Hawkins (1927–87) was the vocalist on Nick Kenny's Children's Follies.

Kenny was a guest on various radio programs between 1939 and 1952, including What's My Name?, Finders Keepers, Music for Millions and The Billion Dollar Show, a 1952 program celebrating the 30th anniversary of broadcasting. He also contributed scripts and poems to Mutual's Family Theatre.

On NBC television, Kenny had his own 15-minute music and talk show, The Nick Kenny Show (1951–52) with cast members Irene Walsh and Don Tippen.

Kenny published several collections of his poems between 1929 and 1959. In addition to poems, the collection Day Unto Day (1943) also featured quotations in "Uncle Nick's Scrap Book," plus tributes to Kenny by Major Edward Bowes, Uncle Don, Ted Malone, Elsa Maxwell and Kate Smith. The poems in this book were grouped into sections, including Human Interest Poems, Personality Poems, Sailor Poems, Patty Poems and Joy Poems. The latter two were about his daughters, Patty and Joy, who were ages 15 and 11, respectively, at the time the book was published.

The illustrator Richard Bassford has long had an interest in Kenny's work and has illustrated Kenny poems in recent years.

== Bibliography ==
- The Navy in Rhyme (New York, 1929)
- Getting an Earful (New York, 1932)
- Favorite Poems (Garden City, New York, 1943)
- Day Unto Day (Garden City, 1943)
- How to Write, Save and Sell Popular Songs (New York, 1946)
- More Poems (Garden City, 1948)
- Poems to Inspire (Minneapolis, 1959)

== See also ==
- Edgar Guest
- Eugene Field
- Franklyn MacCormack
- Franklin Pierce Adams
- List of caricatures at Sardi's restaurant
- O. O. McIntyre
