= Chains of Love (Ahmet Ertegun song) =

1951 song performed by Big Joe Turner

Single by Big Joe Turner
- B-side: "After My Laughter Came Tears"
- Released: May 1951
- Genre: Blues
- Length: 3:12
- Label: Atlantic
- Songwriter(s): A. Nugetre, Van Walls

Big Joe Turner singles chronology
"Mad Blues" (1946)	"Chains of Love" (1951)	"The Chill Is On" (1951)

"Chains Of Love", a 12-bar blues, was written by Doc Pomus (a.k.a. Jerome Solon Felder).

== Background ==
Pomus who sold the copyright to Ahmet Ertegun in 1950 for $50.00 (referencing Doc Pomus and his family). Since Ertegun owned the copyright from that point forward, he had legal right to claim the song as his own which he did using the pseudonym "A. Nugetre".

== Big Joe Turner recording ==
The first recording by Big Joe Turner (as Joe Turner) was in 1951, reaching number 2 on the US Billboard R&B chart.. Turner's version was his first success on the Atlantic label established by Ertegun.

== Popular cover versions ==
- In 1956, the song was covered by Pat Boone, whose version made no. 10 on the Billboard Hot 100.
- Another commercially successful version was by Bobby Bland, whose recording reached no. 9 on the R&B chart and no. 60 on the Hot 100 in 1969.
- American country music artist Mickey Gilley released this song in October 1977 as the third and final single from his album, First Class. The song reached number 9 on the U.S. Billboard Hot Country Singles chart, and number 7 on the Canadian RPM Country Tracks chart in Canada.

== Other cover versions ==
Other covers include:

- The Hollywood Flames released a version of the song as a single in 1958.
- Johnny Burnette & The Rock 'N' Roll Trio (1957)
- Sam Cooke (1962)
- B. B. King (1962)
- The Drifters (1965)
- Little Richard (1973)
- Lou Rawls (1992)
- Irma Thomas (1992).
