= Friendly Persuasion (Thee I Love) =

Song
- Published: 1956
- Composer(s): Dimitri Tiomkin
- Lyricist(s): Paul Francis Webster

"Friendly Persuasion (Thee I Love)" is a popular song with music by Dimitri Tiomkin and lyrics by Paul Francis Webster. It was published in 1956 and appeared in the 1956 film of the same name. At the 29th Academy Awards, Friendly Persuasion was nominated for the Best Music – Song but lost out to "Que Sera, Sera (Whatever Will Be, Will Be)".

== Background ==
The title is an obvious play on words, since the film centers on a Quaker family, a religion known as the "Society of Friends". Thus, they are said to be of the "Friendly" persuasion.

== 1956 recordings ==
- The best-known version of the song was recorded by Pat Boone and it reached the No. 5 position in the USA charts and No. 3 in the UK.
- Another recording by The Four Aces followed Boone's in 1956 and reached number 45 peak position on Billboard's pop music chart.

== Other recordings ==
- Johnny Mathis included the song in his 1963 album Romantically.
- Bing Crosby recorded the song for his album Bing Crosby's Treasury - The Songs I Love (1968 version).
- Aretha Franklin recorded the song for her album Soft and Beautiful (1969).

== Popular culture ==
- The Four Aces version of the song was used in the 2013 BBC television series, Call the Midwife.
