= List of UK top-ten singles in 1958 =

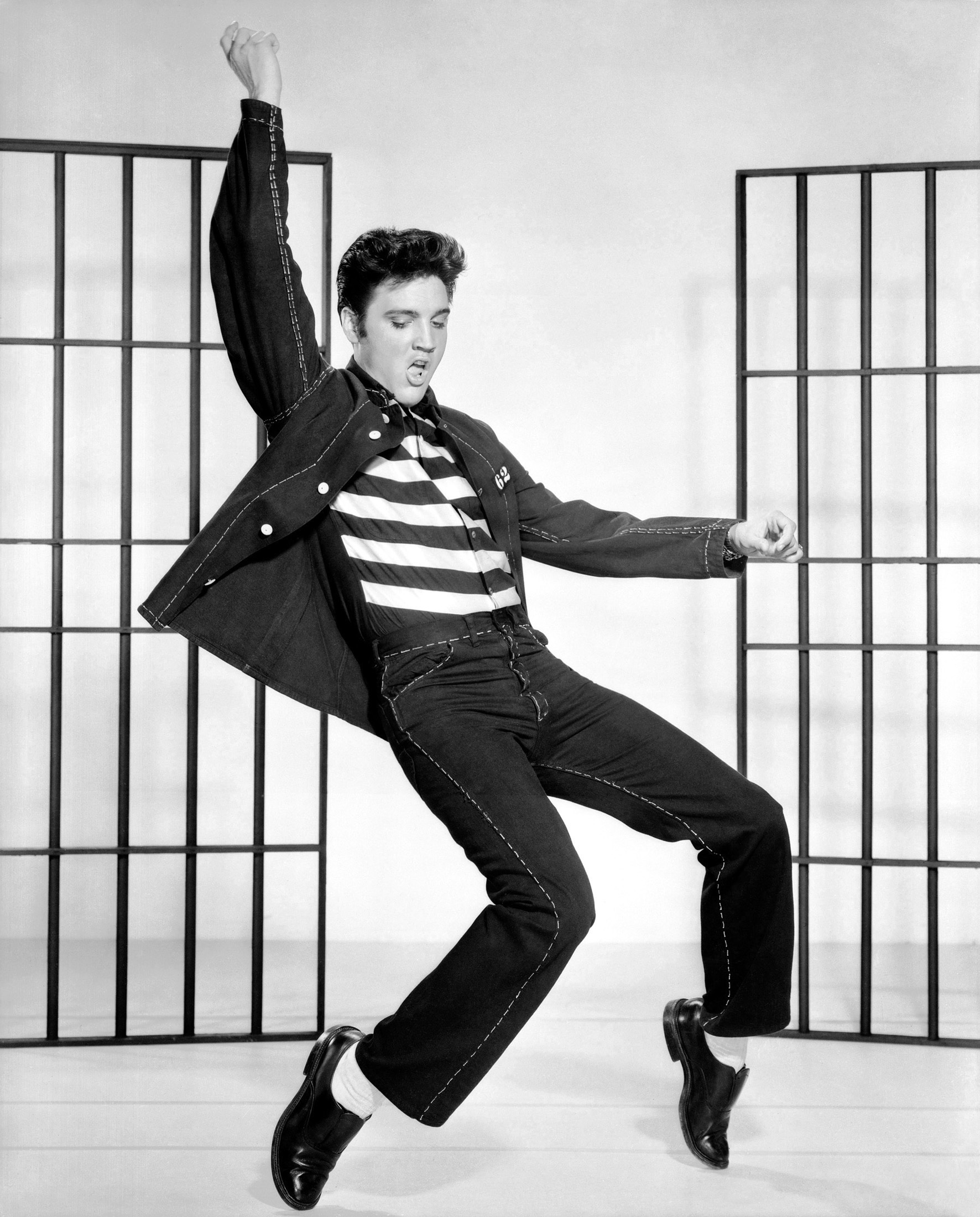
Elvis Presley had the most top 10 entries in 1958, with five in total, all of them peaking within the top three. In January, "Jailhouse Rock" became the first-ever record to debut at number-one in the UK Singles Chart and went on to become the year's best-selling single.

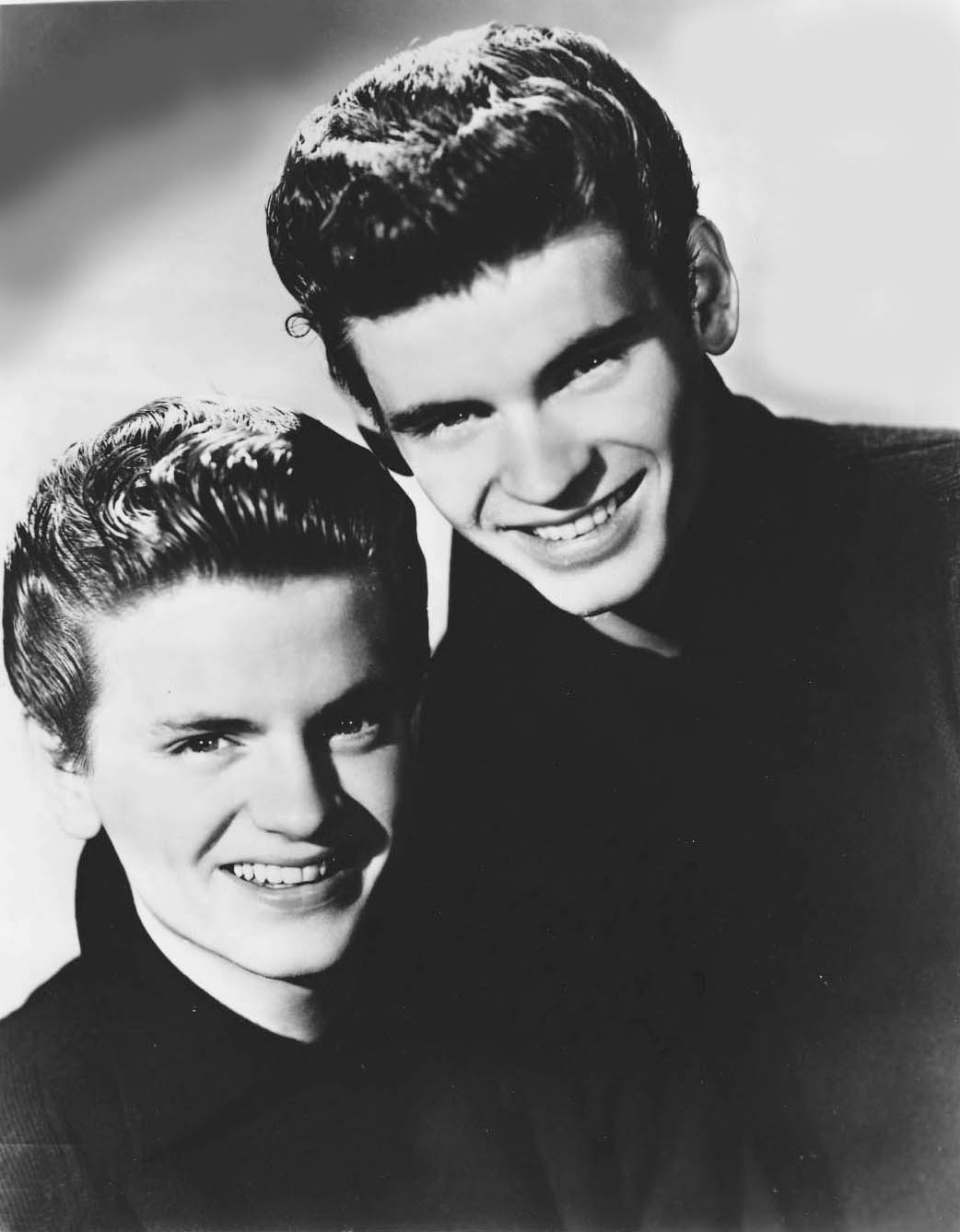
The Everly Brothers achieved three top 10 entries this year, including "All I Have to Do Is Dream"/"Claudette", which spent seven weeks at number-one.

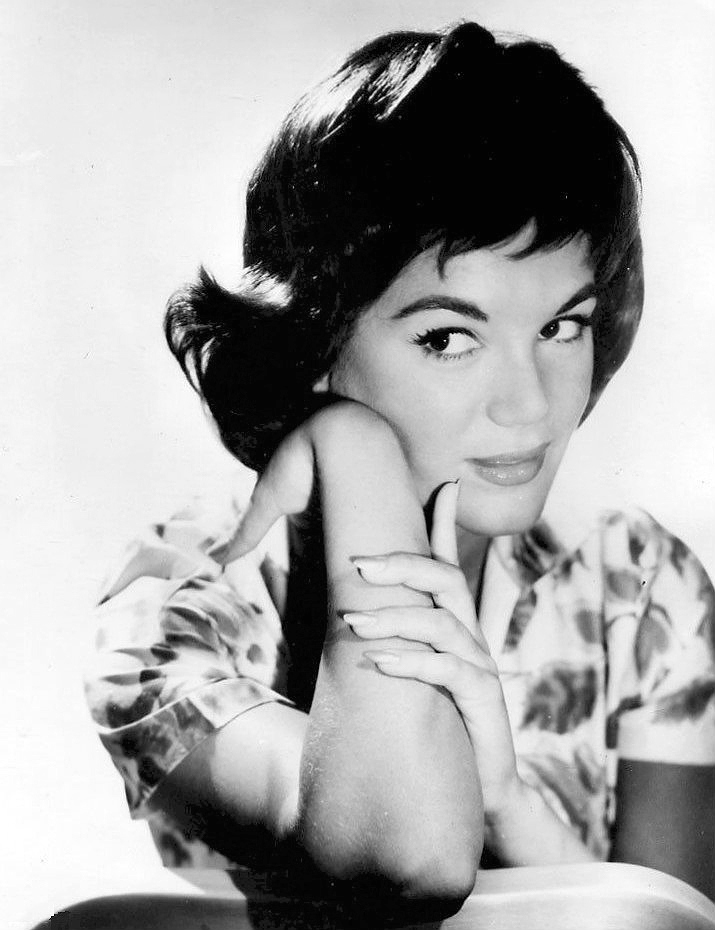
Connie Francis made her UK top 10 debut in 1958 with two singles making the countdown: "Who's Sorry Now?" and "Stupid Cupid"/"Carolina Moon", both of which spent six weeks at number-one.

The UK Singles Chart is one of many music charts compiled by the Official Charts Company that calculates the best-selling singles of the week in the United Kingdom. Before 2004, the chart was only based on the sales of physical singles. This list shows singles that peaked in the Top 10 of the UK Singles Chart during 1958, as well as singles which peaked in 1957 and 1959 but were in the top 10 in 1958. The entry date is when the single appeared in the top 10 for the first time (week ending, as published by the Official Charts Company, which is six days after the chart is announced).

Eighty-five singles were in the top ten in 1958. Ten singles from 1957 remained in the top 10 for several weeks at the beginning of the year, while "Love Makes the World Go 'Round" by Perry Como, "Tea for Two Cha Cha" by The Tommy Dorsey Orchestra starring Warren Covington, "The Day the Rains Came" by Jane Morgan and "Tom Dooley" by The Kingston Trio were all released in 1958 but did not reach their peak until 1959. "All the Way"/"Chicago" by Frank Sinatra "Great Balls of Fire" by Jerry Lee Lewis and "Reet Petite (The Sweetest Girl in Town)" by Jackie Wilson were the singles from 1957 to reach their peak in 1958. Twenty artists scored multiple entries in the top 10 in 1958. Cliff Richard, Connie Francis, Marty Wilde, Michael Holliday and Ricky Nelson were among the many artists who achieved their first UK charting top 10 single in 1958.

The 1957 Christmas number-one, "Mary's Boy Child" by Harry Belafonte, remained at number-one for the first week of 1958. The first new number-one single of the year was "Great Balls of Fire" by Jerry Lee Lewis. Overall, thirteen different singles peaked at number-one in 1958, with Connie Francis (2) having the most singles hit that position.

== Background ==
=== Multiple entries ===
Eighty-five singles charted in the top 10 in 1958, with seventy-five singles reaching their peak this year. Six songs were recorded by several artists with each version reaching the top 10:

- "Come prima" – Marino Marini & His Quartet, Malcolm Vaughan (version known as "More Than Ever")
- "Kewpie Doll" – Frankie Vaughan, Perry Como
- "Kisses Sweeter Than Wine" – Frankie Vaughan, Jimmie Rodgers
- "Lollipop" – The Chordettes, The Mudlarks
- "Tom Dooley" – The Kingston Trio, Lonnie Donegan
- "Volare (Nel blu, dipinto di blu)" – Dean Martin, Domenico Modugno

Twenty artists scored multiple entries in the top 10 in 1958. Elvis Presley secured the record for most top 10 hits in 1958 with five hit singles.

Michael Holliday was one of a number of artists with two top-ten entries, including the number-one single "The Story of My Life". Frankie Vaughan, Jerry Lee Lewis, Lonnie Donegan and Ricky Nelson were among the other artists who had multiple top 10 entries in 1958.

=== Chart debuts ===
Thirty-three artists achieved their first top 10 single in 1958, either as a lead or featured artist. Bernard Bresslaw, Connie Francis, Jimmie Rodgers, Michael Holliday, The Mudlarks, Ricky Nelson, Cliff Richard and The Shadows all had one other entry in their breakthrough year.

The following table (collapsed on desktop site) does not include acts who had previously charted as part of a group and secured their first top 10 solo single.

Artist	Number of top 10s	First entry	Chart position	Other entries
Jimmie Rodgers	1	"Kisses Sweeter Than Wine"	7	—
Michael Holliday	2	"The Story of My Life"	1	"Stairway of Love" (3)
Danny & the Juniors	1	"At the Hop"	3	—
Marion Ryan	1	"Love Me Forever"	5	—
Marvin Rainwater	1	"Whole Lotta Woman"	1	—
Jackie Dennis	1	"La Dee Dah"	4	—
The Champs	1	"Tequila"	5	—
Connie Francis	2	"Who's Sorry Now?"	1	"Stupid Cupid"/"Carolina Moon" (1)
Elias and His Zig-Zag Jive Flutes	1	"Tom Hark"	2	—
The Mudlarks	2	"Lollipop"	2	"Book of Love" (8)
Vic Damone	1	"On the Street Where You Live"	1	—
Don Lang and His "Frantic Five"	1	"Witch Doctor"	5	—
Alfie Bass	1	"The Signature Tune of The Army Game"	5	—
Bernard Bresslaw	2	"The Signature Tune of The Army Game"	5	"Mad Passionate Love" (6)
Leslie Fyson	1	"The Signature Tune of The Army Game"	5	—
Michael Medwin	1	"The Signature Tune of The Army Game"	5	—
The Four Preps	1	"Big Man"	2	—
Marty Wilde	1	"Endless Sleep"	4	—
The Kalin Twins	1	"When"	1	—
Charlie Drake	1	"Splish Splash"	7	—
Ricky Nelson	2	"Poor Little Fool"	4	"Someday" (9)
Domenico Modugno	1	"Volare (Nel blu, dipinto di blu)"	10	—
Cliff Richard	2	"Move It"	2	"High Class Baby" (7)
The Shadows/The Drifters ^{[A]}	2	"Move It"	2	"High Class Baby" (7)
The Poni-Tails	1	"Born Too Late"	5	—
Johnny Mathis	1	"A Certain Smile"	4	—
Marino Marini & His Quartet	1	"Come prima"	2	—
Tommy Edwards	1	"It's All in the Game"	1	—
Lord Rockingham's XI	1	"Hoots Mon"	1	—
Jack Scott	1	"My True Love"	9	—
Conway Twitty	1	"It's Only Make Believe"	1	—
The Tommy Dorsey Orchestra	1	"Tea for Two Cha Cha" ^{[B]}	3	—
The Kingston Trio	1	"Tom Dooley" ^{[C]}	5	—
Jane Morgan	1	"The Day the Rains Came"	1	—

Notes

Buddy Holly was the lead singer with The Crickets, appearing on their 1957 number-one hit "That'll Be the Day". As well as scoring two top 10 hits with the group this year ("Oh, Boy!" and "Maybe Baby"), Holly also achieved two solo entries during the year with "Peggy Sue" and "Rave On".

=== Songs from films ===
Original songs from various films entered the top 10 throughout the year. These included "Great Balls of Fire" (from Jamboree), "Jailhouse Rock" (Jailhouse Rock), "April Love" (April Love), "On the Street Where You Live" (My Fair Lady), "Hard Headed Woman" & "King Creole" (King Creole) and "A Certain Smile" (A Certain Smile).

=== Best-selling singles ===
Until 1970 there was no universally recognised year-end best-sellers list. However, in 2011 the Official Charts Company released a list of the best-selling single of each year in chart history from 1952 to date. According to the list, "Jailhouse Rock" by Elvis Presley is officially recorded as the biggest-selling single of 1958. "Jailhouse Rock" (5) was ranked in the top 10 best-selling singles of the decade.

== Top-ten singles ==
Key

Symbol	Meaning
‡	Single peaked in 1957 but still in chart in 1958.
♦	Single released in 1958 but peaked in 1959.
(#)	Year-end best-selling single.
Entered	The date that the single first appeared in the chart.
Peak	Highest position that the single reached in the UK Singles Chart.

Entered (week ending)	Weeks in top 10	Single	Artist	Peak	Peak reached (week ending)	Weeks at peak
Singles in 1957
23 August 1957	15	"Diana" ‡ ^{[D]}	Paul Anka	1	30 August 1957	9
15 November 1957	9	"Mary's Boy Child" ‡ ^{[E]}	Harry Belafonte	1	22 November 1957	7
15 November 1957	10	"I Love You Baby" ‡	Paul Anka	3	13 December 1957	1
22 November 1957	8	"Wake Up Little Susie" ‡	The Everly Brothers	2	13 December 1957	2
29 November 1957	11	"Ma! He's Making Eyes at Me" ‡	Johnny Otis & His Orchestra with Marie Adams	2	20 December 1957	5
6 December 1957	9	"My Special Angel" ‡	Malcolm Vaughan	3	27 December 1957	2
13 December 1957	4	"Alone" ‡	Petula Clark	8	13 December 1957	1
13 December 1957	7	"Reet Petite"	Jackie Wilson	6	3 January 1958	1
20 December 1957	12	"All the Way"/"Chicago"	Frank Sinatra	3	17 January 1958	2
27 December 1957	7	"Great Balls of Fire"	Jerry Lee Lewis	1	10 January 1958	2
Singles in 1958
10 January 1958	4	"Kisses Sweeter than Wine"	Jimmie Rodgers	7	17 January 1958	1
10 January 1958	8	"Peggy Sue"	Buddy Holly	6	17 January 1958	2
10 January 1958	2	"Kisses Sweeter than Wine"	Frankie Vaughan	8	17 January 1958	1
17 January 1958	10	"Oh, Boy!"	The Crickets	3	31 January 1958	2
24 January 1958	10	"Jailhouse Rock" (#1) ^{[F]}	Elvis Presley	1	24 January 1958	3
24 January 1958	12	"The Story of My Life"	Michael Holliday	1	14 February 1958	2
31 January 1958	7	"April Love"	Pat Boone	7	14 February 1958	1
7 February 1958	9	"At the Hop"	Danny & the Juniors	3	21 March 1958	1
7 February 1958	6	"Love Me Forever"	Marion Ryan	5	28 February 1958	1
14 February 1958	12	"Magic Moments" ^{[G]}	Perry Como	1	28 February 1958	8
14 February 1958	7	"You Are My Destiny"	Paul Anka	6	7 March 1958	1
7 March 1958	7	"Don't" ^{[H]}	Elvis Presley	2	28 March 1958	1
14 March 1958	7	"Nairobi"	Tommy Steele & the Steelmen	3	4 April 1958	2
21 March 1958	1	"Good Golly, Miss Molly"	Little Richard	8	21 March 1958	1
21 March 1958	1	"Catch a Falling Star" ^{[G]}	Perry Como	9	21 March 1958	1
28 March 1958	10	"Whole Lotta Woman"	Marvin Rainwater	1	25 April 1958	3
28 March 1958	4	"La Dee Dah"	Jackie Dennis	4	11 April 1958	1
28 March 1958	6	"Maybe Baby"	The Crickets	4	18 April 1958	1
4 April 1958	1	"Mandy (La Panse)"	Eddie Calvert	9	4 April 1958	1
4 April 1958	6	"Tequila"	The Champs	5	25 April 1958	1
4 April 1958	7	"Swingin' Shepherd Blues"	Ted Heath & His Music	3	18 April 1958	3
11 April 1958	17	"Who's Sorry Now?"	Connie Francis	1	16 May 1958	6
18 April 1958	10	"A Wonderful Time Up There"	Pat Boone	2	16 May 1958	1
18 April 1958	3	"It's Too Soon to Know" ^{[I]}	Pat Boone	7	25 April 1958	1
25 April 1958	2	"Breathless"	Jerry Lee Lewis	8	2 May 1958	1
2 May 1958	4	"Lollipop"	The Chordettes	6	9 May 1958	1
9 May 1958	4	"Wear My Ring Around Your Neck"	Elvis Presley	3	23 May 1958	1
9 May 1958	9	"Tom Hark"	Elias & His Zig-Zag Jive Flutes	2	23 May 1958	4
9 May 1958	6	"The Grand Coulee Dam"	Lonnie Donegan	6	30 May 1958	2
9 May 1958	7	"Lollipop"	The Mudlarks	2	30 May 1958	1
23 May 1958	10	"On the Street Where You Live"	Vic Damone	1	27 June 1958	2
23 May 1958	2	"Kewpie Doll"	Perry Como	9	30 May 1958	1
30 May 1958	14	"Tulips from Amsterdam"/"You Need Hands"	Max Bygraves	3	4 July 1958	3
6 June 1958	5	"Stairway of Love" ^{[J]}	Michael Holliday	3	13 June 1958	1
6 June 1958	6	"Witch Doctor" ^{[K]}	Don Lang & His "Frantic Five"	5	13 June 1958	1
6 June 1958	2	"Kewpie Doll"	Frankie Vaughan	10	6 June 1958	2
13 June 1958	15	"All I Have to Do Is Dream"/"Claudette"	The Everly Brothers	1	4 July 1958	7
20 June 1958	3	"The Signature Tune of The Army Game"	Michael Medwin, Bernard Bresslaw, Alfie Bass & Leslie Fyson	5	27 June 1958	1
27 June 1958	4	"Book of Love"	The Mudlarks	8	4 July 1958	2
27 June 1958	9	"Big Man"	The Four Preps	2	18 July 1958	2
4 July 1958	7	"Twilight Time"	The Platters	3	11 July 1958	1
11 July 1958	4	"Sugar Moon" ^{[L]}	Pat Boone	6	18 July 1958	1
11 July 1958	8	"Rave On"	Buddy Holly	5	1 August 1958	1
25 July 1958	6	"Hard Headed Woman"	Elvis Presley	2	1 August 1958	2
25 July 1958	10	"Endless Sleep"	Marty Wilde	4	29 August 1958	1
1 August 1958	12	"When"	The Kalin Twins	1	22 August 1958	5
1 August 1958	11	"Return to Me"	Dean Martin	2	5 September 1958	1
15 August 1958	5	"Patricia" ^{[M]}	Pérez 'Prez' Prado	8	5 September 1958	1
22 August 1958	6	"Splish Splash" ^{[N]}	Charlie Drake	7	12 September 1958	1
29 August 1958	13	"Stupid Cupid"/"Carolina Moon"	Connie Francis	1	26 September 1958	6
29 August 1958	6	"Fever"	Peggy Lee	5	26 September 1958	1
5 September 1958	9	"Volare (Nel blu, dipinto di blu)"	Dean Martin	2	26 September 1958	3
5 September 1958	6	"Poor Little Fool"	Ricky Nelson	4	3 October 1958	1
12 September 1958	1	"Volare (Nel blu, dipinto di blu)"	Domenico Modugno	10	12 September 1958	1
26 September 1958	4	"Mad Passionate Love"	Bernard Bresslaw	6	3 October 1958	1
26 September 1958	10	"Bird Dog"	The Everly Brothers	2	14 November 1958	1
3 October 1958	7	"King Creole"	Elvis Presley	2	17 October 1958	1
10 October 1958	8	"Move It"	Cliff Richard & The Drifters ^{[A]}	2	24 October 1958	1
10 October 1958	5	"Born Too Late"	The Poni-Tails	5	17 October 1958	1
10 October 1958	9	"A Certain Smile"	Johnny Mathis	4	21 November 1958	2
17 October 1958	7	"Come prima"	Marino Marini & His Quartet	2	24 October 1958	3
24 October 1958	11	"It's All in the Game"	Tommy Edwards	1	7 November 1958	3
24 October 1958	8	"More Than Ever" ^{[O]}	Malcolm Vaughan	5	21 November 1958	1
31 October 1958	13	"Hoots Mon"	Lord Rockingham's XI	1	28 November 1958	3
14 November 1958	1	"My True Love"	Jack Scott	9	14 November 1958	1
21 November 1958	12	"It's Only Make Believe"	Conway Twitty	1	19 December 1958	5
21 November 1958	9	"Tea for Two Cha Cha" ♦ ^{[P]}	The Tommy Dorsey Orchestra starring Warren Covington	3	2 January 1959	1
28 November 1958	9	"Tom Dooley" ^{[Q]}	Lonnie Donegan	3	5 December 1958	5
28 November 1958	8	"Love Makes the World Go Round" ♦	Perry Como	6	9 January 1959	1
5 December 1958	7	"Tom Dooley" ♦ ^{[R]}	The Kingston Trio	5	2 January 1959	1
5 December 1958	7	"High Class Baby"	Cliff Richard & The Drifters ^{[A]}	7	12 December 1958	1
5 December 1958	2	"Someday"	Ricky Nelson	9	12 December 1958	1
26 December 1958	9	"The Day the Rains Came" ♦	Jane Morgan	1	23 January 1959	1
26 December 1958	2	"Come On, Let's Go" ^{[F]}	Tommy Steele	10	26 December 1958	2

== Entries by artist ==
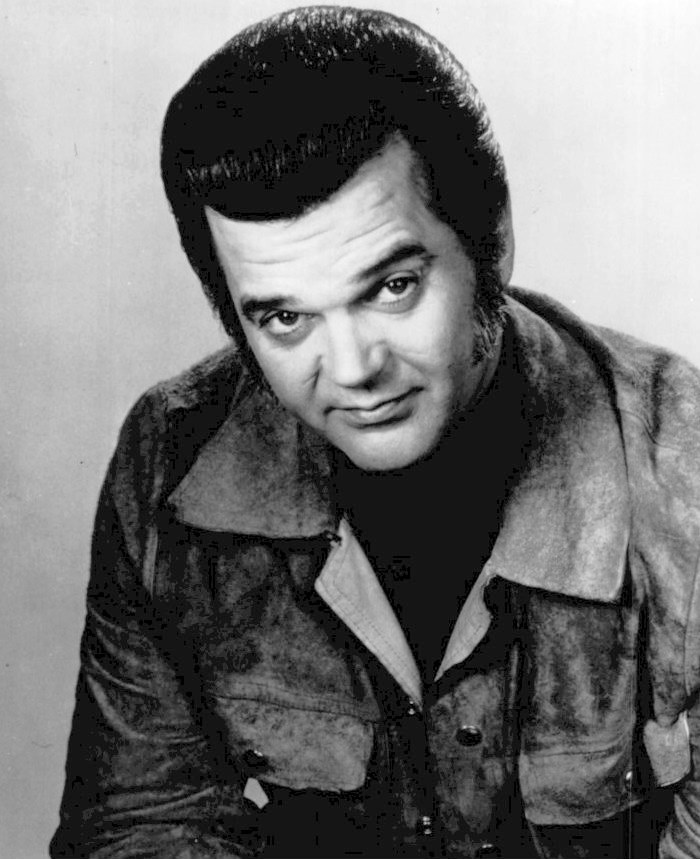
Conway Twitty (pictured in 1974) scored this year's Christmas number-one single with "It's Only Make Believe", which spent five weeks at the top of the chart.

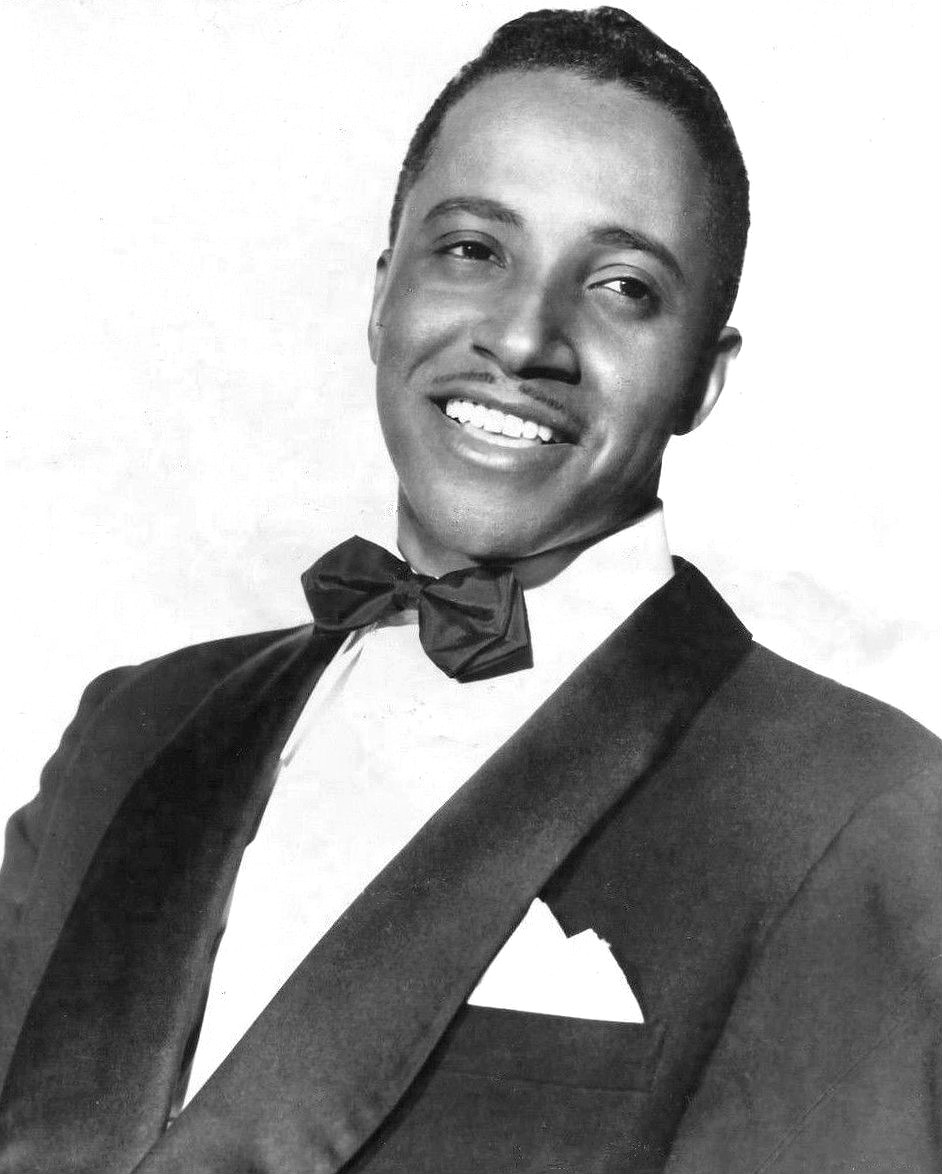
Tommy Edwards achieved his first and only UK top 10 hit in 1958 with "It's All in the Game", which spent three weeks at number-one.

The following table shows artists who achieved two or more top 10 entries in 1958, including singles that reached their peak in 1957 or 1959. The figures include both main artists and featured artists. The total number of weeks an artist spent in the top ten in 1958 is also shown.

Entries	Artist	Weeks	Singles
5	Elvis Presley	34	"Don't", "Hard Headed Woman", "Jailhouse Rock", "King Creole", "Wear My Ring Around Your Neck"
4	Buddy Holly ^{[S]}	32	"Maybe Baby", "Oh, Boy!", "Peggy Sue", "Rave On"
4	Pat Boone	24	"April Love", "A Wonderful Time Up There", "It's Too Soon to Know", "Sugar Moon"
4	Perry Como ^{[V]}	23	"Catch a Falling Star", "Kewpie Doll", "Love Makes the World Go 'Round", "Magic Moments"
3	The Everly Brothers ^{[T]}	28	"All I Have to Do Is Dream"/"Claudette", "Bird Dog", "Wake Up Little Susie"
3	Paul Anka ^{[T]}	12	"Diana", "I Love You Baby", "You Are My Destiny"
2	Bernard Bresslaw	7	"Mad Passionate Love", "The Signature Tune of "The Army Game"
2	Cliff Richard	11	"High Class Baby", "Move It"
2	Connie Francis	30	"Stupid Cupid"/"Carolina Moon", "Who's Sorry Now?"
2	The Crickets	16	"Maybe Baby", "Oh, Boy!"
2	Dean Martin	20	"Return to Me", "Volare (Nel blu, dipinto di blu)"
2	The Shadows/The Drifters ^{[A]}	11	"High Class Baby", "Move It"
2	Frankie Vaughan	4	"Kewpie Doll", "Kisses Sweeter than Wine"
2	Jerry Lee Lewis	9	"Breathless", "Great Balls of Fire"
2	Lonnie Donegan	10	"The Grand Coulee Dam", "Tom Dooley"
2	Malcolm Vaughan ^{[U]}	14	"More Than Ever", "My Special Angel"
2	Michael Holliday	17	"Stairway of Love", "The Story of My Life"
2	The Mudlarks	11	"Book of Love", "Lollipop"
2	Ricky Nelson	8	"Poor Little Fool", "Someday"
2	Tommy Steele	8	"Come On, Let's Go", "Nairobi"

== Notes ==
- ^{a} The Drifters changed their name to The Shadows in 1959, to avoid confusion with the American group of the same name, who also threatened legal action over the band's name after "Feelin' Fine" was released in the United States.
- ^{b} "Tea for Two Cha Cha" reached its peak of number three on 8 January 1959 (week ending).
- ^{c} "Tom Dooley" (The Kingston Trio version) reached its peak of number five on 8 January 1959 (week ending).
- ^{d} "Diana" re-entered the top 10 at number 10 on 9 January 1958 (week ending).
- ^{e} "Mary's Boy Child" re-entered the top 10 at number 10 on 25 December 1958 (week ending).
- ^{f} "All I Have to Do Is Dream"/"Claudette" is recorded as the best-selling single of the year by some sources but the Official Charts Company lists "Jailhouse Rock" as its best-seller. According to one list, "Jailhouse Rock" does not even make the top ten best-sellers.
- ^{g} "Magic Moments"/"Catch a Falling Star" are credited as separate songs on some best-selling singles chart.
- ^{h} "Don't" re-entered the top 10 at number 9 on 8 May 1958 (week ending).
- ^{i} "It's Too Soon to Know" re-entered the top 10 at number 10 on 22 May 1958 (week ending).
- ^{j} "Stairway of Love" re-entered the top 10 at number 9 on 17 July 1958 (week ending).
- ^{k} "Witch Doctor" re-entered the top 10 at number 10 on 24 July 1958 (week ending).
- ^{l} "Sugar Moon" re-entered the top 10 at number 10 on 14 August 1958 (week ending).
- ^{m} "Patricia" re-entered the top 10 at number 10 on 25 September 1958 (week ending).
- ^{n} "Splish Splash" re-entered the top 10 at number 10 on 11 September 1958 (week ending) for 5 weeks.
- ^{o} "More Than Ever" re-entered the top 10 at number 8 on 13 November 1958 (week ending) for 7 weeks.
- ^{p} "Tea for Two Cha Cha" re-entered the top 10 at number 6 on 11 December 1958 (week ending) for 8 weeks.
- ^{q} "Tom Dooley" (Lonnie Donegan version) re-entered the top 10 at number 10 on 5 February 1959 (week ending).
- ^{r} "Tom Dooley" (The Kingston Trio version) re-entered the top 10 at number 10 on 29 January 1959 (week ending).
- ^{s} Figure includes two top 10 hits with the group The Crickets.
- ^{t} Figure includes single that peaked in 1957.
- ^{u} Figure includes single that first charted in 1957 but peaked in 1958.
- ^{v} Figure includes single that peaked in 1959.

== See also ==
- 1958 in British music
- List of number-one singles from the 1950s (UK)
