= 1958 in country music =

This is a list of notable events in country music that took place in the year 1958.

== Events ==
- January 1 — Johnny Cash performs at San Quentin Prison. One of the audience members is Merle Haggard, in the midst of a two-year prison term for burglary.
- February — Struggling singer-songwriter Don Gibson finally gets a career break when his first major hit, "Oh Lonesome Me" reaches No. 1 on Billboard's "C&W Best Sellers in Stores" and "Most Played C&W by Jockeys" charts. The flip side of the single is "I Can't Stop Loving You," which went on to be recorded more than 700 times. Gibson is considered by many to be one of the originators of the Nashville Sound, a form of country music that uses pop music-styled arrangements (such as orchestrated strings) rather than traditional honky-tonk sounds.
- March — BMI opens its Nashville office, headed by Frances Preston.
- March 24 — Elvis Presley is inducted into the United States Army at the Memphis Draft Board, thus beginning his two years of service.
- May — The fledgling career of Jerry Lee Lewis is rocked by scandal when his marriage to second cousin Myra Gale Brown becomes public. A British tour is cancelled, and Lewis' career goes into decline until 1968, when he begins concentrating on country music.
- October 13 — Billboard discontinues the "C&W Best Sellers in Stores" and "Most Played C&W by Jockeys" charts. Starting with the October 20 issue, there is one all-encompassing "Hot C&W Sides" chart. The new chart has 30 positions, and "City Lights" by Ray Price is the first No. 1 song.
- November — The Country Music Association is founded to promote country music. Harry Stone, the former station manager of WSM, is named executive director.
- November — Conway Twitty begins a remarkable career ... in rock and roll, with his hit, "It's Only Make Believe." The song – which contains all the Twitty hallmarks – skyrockets to No. 1 on the Billboard Hot 100 chart in the fall, and begins a string of hits that continues through the early 1960s. Twitty makes the switch to country in the mid-1960s. Although "... Make Believe" is never a country hit, the song has become a country standard in the years since Twitty became a country giant.
- December 26 — Johnny Cash tops a country and western concert at the Showboat Hotel in Las Vegas, Nevada; also appearing are Tex Ritter and the Sons of the Pioneers.

== Top hits of the year ==
=== Number-one hits ===
==== United States ====
(as certified by Billboard)

Date	Single Name	Artist	Wks. No.1	Spec. Note
January 6	The Story of My Life	Marty Robbins	4
January 6	Great Balls of Fire	Jerry Lee Lewis	2	Also reached Number One in the United Kingdom.
February 3	Ballad of a Teenage Queen	Johnny Cash	10
April 14	Oh Lonesome Me / I Can't Stop Loving You	Don Gibson	8	^{[1], [2], [A]}
May 26	Just Married	Marty Robbins	2	^{[2]}
June 2	All I Have to Do is Dream	The Everly Brothers	3	Also reached Number One on the Billboard Pop and R&B charts.
June 23	Guess Things Happen That Way	Johnny Cash	8
July 21	Alone With You	Faron Young	13	Young's first Billboard Number One since "Live Fast, Love Hard, Die Young" in 1955.
August 25	Blue Blue Day	Don Gibson	2
September 8	Bird Dog	The Everly Brothers	6	^{[B]}
October 20	City Lights	Ray Price	13

Notes

- 1 No. 1 song of the year, as determined by Billboard.
- 2 Song dropped from No. 1 and later returned to top spot.
- A First Billboard No. 1 hit for that artist.
- B Last Billboard No. 1 hit for that artist.

Note: Through October 13, several songs were simultaneous No. 1 hits on the separate "Most Played C&W by Jockeys" and "C&W Best Sellers in Stores" charts. Only one No. 1 per week is possible starting with the "Hot C&W Sides" chart, which begins October 20.

=== Other major hits ===
US	Single	Artist
8	All Grown Up	Johnny Horton
4	All Over Again	Johnny Cash
3	Anna Marie	Jim Reeves
13	Are You Really Mine?	Jimmie Rodgers
10	Believe What You Say	Ricky Nelson
4	Big River	Johnny Cash
7	Big Wheels	Hank Snow
2	Blue Boy	Jim Reeves
4	Breathless	Jerry Lee Lewis
15	Claudette	The Everly Brothers
7	Color of the Blues	George Jones
6	Come In, Stranger	Johnny Cash
3	Crying Over You	Webb Pierce
3	Curtain in the Window	Ray Price
7	Devoted to You	The Everly Brothers
2	Don't	Elvis Presley
10	Every Time I'm Kissing You	Faron Young
10	Falling Back to You	Webb Pierce
5	Give Myself a Party	Don Gibson
8	Half a Mind	Ernest Tubb
2	Hard Headed Woman	Elvis Presley
14	Have Blues-Will Travel	Eddie Noack
16	He's Lost His Love for Me	Kitty Wells
9	Hey, Mr. Bluebird	Ernest Tubb and The Wilburn Brothers
9	High School Confidential	Jerry Lee Lewis
13	House of Glass	Ernest Tubb
11	How Do You Hold a Memory	Hank Thompson
4	I Beg of You	Elvis Presley
3	I Can't Stop Loving You	Kitty Wells
7	I Can't Stop Loving You	Don Gibson
5	I Found My Girl in the USA	Jimmie Skinner
8	I Love You More	Jim Reeves
18	I Want to Go Where No One Knows Me	Jean Shepard
19	I'll Make It All Up to You	Jerry Lee Lewis
3	Invitation to the Blues	Ray Price
9	Is It Wrong (For Loving You)	Warner Mack
3	It's a Little More Like Heaven	Hank Locklin
5	Jacqueline	Bobby Helms
7	Jealousy	Kitty Wells
10	Just a Little Lonesome	Bobby Helms
18	Lonely Island Pearl	Johnnie & Jack
8	Look Who's Blue	Don Gibson
15	Lost to a Geisha Girl	Skeeter Davis
12	Love Bug Crawl	Jimmy Edwards
10	My Bucket's Got a Hole in It	Ricky Nelson
11	Nothin' Needs Nothin' (Like I Need You)	Marvin Rainwater
5	Oh-Oh, I'm Falling in Love Again	Jimmie Rodgers
8	Once More	Roy Acuff
13	Once More	Osborne Brothers and Red Allen
12	One Week Later	Webb Pierce and Kitty Wells
10	Overnight	Jim Reeves
18	Patricia	Perez Prado
2	Pick Me Up On Your Way Down	Charlie Walker
17	Pink Pedal Pushers	Carl Perkins
9	Please Pass the Biscuits	Gene Sullivan
3	Poor Little Fool	Ricky Nelson
6	Raunchy	Bill Justis
11	Raunchy	Ernie Freeman
17	Rebel-'Rouser	Duane Eddy
14	Rock Hearts	Jimmy Martin
5	Secretly	Jimmie Rodgers
5	Send Me the Pillow You Dream On	Hank Locklin
4	She Was Only Seventeen (He Was One Year More)	Marty Robbins
10	Should We Tell Him	The Everly Brothers
14	Splish Splash	Bobby Darin
2	Squaws Along the Yukon	Hank Thompson
2	Stairway of Love	Marty Robbins
8	Stood Up	Ricky Nelson
7	Stop the World (And Let Me Off)	Johnnie & Jack
16	Talk to Me Lonesome Heart	James O'Gwynn
9	That's the Way I Feel	Faron Young
4	This Little Girl of Mine	The Everly Brothers
15	Touch and Go Heart	Kitty Wells
6	Treasure of Love	George Jones
7	Tupelo County Jail	Webb Pierce
8	Uh-Huh-mm	Sonny James
12	Waitin' in School	Ricky Nelson
2	The Ways of a Woman in Love	Johnny Cash
3	Wear My Ring Around Your Neck	Elvis Presley
7	What Do I Care	Johnny Cash
8	What Makes a Man Wander	Jimmie Skinner
13	When	Kalin Twins
15	Whispering Rain	Hank Snow
15	Whole Lotta Woman	Marvin Rainwater
16	A Woman Captured Me	Hank Snow
13	Would You Care	The Browns
2	You Win Again	Jerry Lee Lewis
10	You'll Come Back	Webb Pierce
5	You're the Nearest Thing to Heaven	Johnny Cash
6	Your Name Is Beautiful	Carl Smith

== Top new album releases ==
- Foreign Love – Hank Locklin (RCA Victor)
- Sings the Songs that Made Him Famous – Johnny Cash (Sun)

== Births ==
- February 21 — Mary Chapin Carpenter, folk-styled country singer of the 1990s.
- February 24 — Sammy Kershaw, neotraditionalist of the 1990s and beyond.
- March 28 — Elisabeth Andreassen, Norwegian female country singer.
- May 23 — Shelly West, country singer of the 1980s, daughter of Dottie West.
- July 3 — Aaron Tippin, honky-tonk styled singer-songwriter of the 1990s and 2000s (decade).
- July 29 — Bobby Jensen, keyboardist from the Western Underground.
- July 30 — Neal McCoy, Asian country singer of the 1990s.
- September 6 — Jeff Foxworthy, comedian best known for "You Must Be a Redneck If ..." tagline; host of eponymously named countdown and "Are You Smarter Than a 5th Grader?" game show.
- September 16 — Terry McBride, lead singer of the 1990s trio McBride & the Ride.
- September 30 — Marty Stuart, neotraditionalist and Grand Ole Opry stalwart.
- October 10 — Tanya Tucker, teen-aged country star of the 1970s, who continued to be a major country star during the 1980s and 1990s.
- October 17 — Alan Jackson, neotraditionalist singer since the 1990s.
- October 25 — Mark Miller, lead singer of Sawyer Brown.
- December 28 — Joe Diffie, honky tonk-styled singer of the 1990s and early 2000s (decade) (d. 2020).

== Deaths ==
- September 12 – Rod Brasfield, 48, comedian who was immensely popular with Grand Ole Opry audiences (heart failure).

== Other links ==
- Country Music Association
