= Billboard year-end top 50 country & western singles of 1958 =

This is a list of Billboard magazine's ranking of the year's top country and western singles of 1958.

Don Gibson had the year's No. 1 single with "Oh Lonesome Me"/"I Can't Stop Loving You". Gibson also had the year's No. 9 record with "Blue Blue Day".

Johnny Cash had three of the year's top 10 country & western singles: "Guess Things Happen That Way"/"Come in, Stranger" at No. 3; "The Ways of a Woman in Love"/"You're the Nearest Thing to Heaven" at No. 6; and "Ballad of a Teenage Queen" at No. 7.

RCA Victor led all labels with 13 of the top 50 singles. Columbia Records and Decca Records followed with nine each. With the popularity of Johnny Cash and Jerry Lee Lewis, Sun Records had seven. Cadence Records had four top singles, all by the Everly Brothers.

Rank	Peak (Note: This column recites the record's peak position on Billboard's weekly charts.)	Title	Artist(s)	Label
1	1/7	"Oh Lonesome Me"/"I Can't Stop Loving You"	Don Gibson	RCA Victor
2	1/2	"Just Married"/"Stairway of Love"	Marty Robbins	Columbia
3	1/6	"Guess Things Happen That Way"/"Come in, Stranger"	Johnny Cash	Sun
4	1/3	"City Lights"/"Invitation to the Blues"	Ray Price	Columbia
5	2/4	"Don't"/"I Beg of You"	Elvis Presley	RCA Victor
6	2/5	"The Ways of a Woman in Love"/"You're the Nearest Thing to Heaven"	Johnny Cash	Sun
7	1	"Ballad of a Teenage Queen"	Johnny Cash	Sun
8	5	"Send Me the Pillow You Dream On"	Hank Locklin	RCA Victor
9	1	"Blue Blue Day"	Don Gibson	RCA Victor
10	1	"Alone with You"	Faron Young	Capitol
10	2	"Blue Boy"	Jim Reeves	RCA Victor
12	1/7	"Bird Dog"/"Devoted to You"	The Everly Brothers	Cadence
13	1	"All I Have to Do Is Dream"	The Everly Brothers	Cadence
14	1	"The Story of My Life"	Marty Robbins	Columbia
15	3	"I Can't Stop Loving You"	Kitty Wells	Decca
16	4	"Geisha Girl"	Hank Locklin	RCA Victor
17	2/-	"Hard Headed Woman"/"Don't Ask Me Why"	Elvis Presley	RCA Victor
18	3	"It's a Little More Like Heaven"	Hank Locklin	RCA Victor
19	1	"Great Balls of Fire"	Jerry Lee Lewis	Sun
20	5	"Secretly"	Jimmie Rodgers	Roulette
21	3/-	"Wear My Ring Around Your Neck"/"Doncha' Think It's Time"	Elvis Presley	RCA Victor
22	3	"Poor Little Fool"	Ricky Nelson	Imperial
23	4/7	"All Over Again"/"What Do I Care"	Johnny Cash	Columbia
24	7	"Stop the World (And Let Me Off)"	Johnnie & Jack	RCA Victor
25	1	"My Special Angel"	Bobby Helms	Decca
26	4	"This Little Girl of Mine"	The Everly Brothers	Cadence
27	3	"Curtain in the Window"	Ray Price	Columbia
27	2	"Squaws Along the Yukon"	Hank Thompson	Capitol
29	9	"Is It Wrong (For Loving You)"	Warner Mack	Decca
30	4	"Breathless"	Jerry Lee Lewis	Sun
31	3	"Crying Over You"	Webb Pierce	Decca
32	5/8	"Give Myself a Party"/"Look Who's Blue"	Don Gibson	RCA Victor
33	8/12	"Stood Up"/"Waitin' in School"	Ricky Nelson	Imperial
33	10/10	"My Bucket's Got a Hole in It"/"Believe What You Say"	Ricky Nelson	Imperial
35	3	"Anna Marie"	Jim Reeves	RCA Victor
36	7	"Jealousy"	Kitty Wells	Decca
37	1	"My Shoes Keep Walking Back to You"	Ray Price	Columbia
38	6	"Your Name Is Beautiful"	Carl Smith	Columbia
39	1	"Jailhouse Rock"	Elvis Presley	RCA Victor
40	1	"Fraulein"	Bobby Helms	Decca
41	4	"She Was Only Seventeen (He Was One Year More)"	Marty Robbins	Columbia
42	6	"Raunchy"	Bill Justis	Phillips International
43	5	"Jacqueline"	Bobby Helms	Decca
44	2	"Pick Me Up on Your Way Down"	Charlie Walker	Columbia
45	1	"Wake Up Little Susie"	The Everly Brothers	Cadence
46	9	"High School Confidential"	Jerry Lee Lewis	Sun
47	5	"Oh-Oh, I'm Falling in Love Again"	Jimmie Rodgers	Roulette
48	8	"Half a Mind"	Ernest Tubb	Decca
49	10	"Just a Little Lonesome"	Bobby Helms	Decca
50	3/13	"Home of the Blues"/"Give My Love to Rose"	Johnny Cash	Sun

== See also ==
- List of Billboard number-one country songs of 1958
- Billboard year-end top 50 singles of 1958
- 1958 in country music
