= List of Billboard number-one country songs of 1958 =

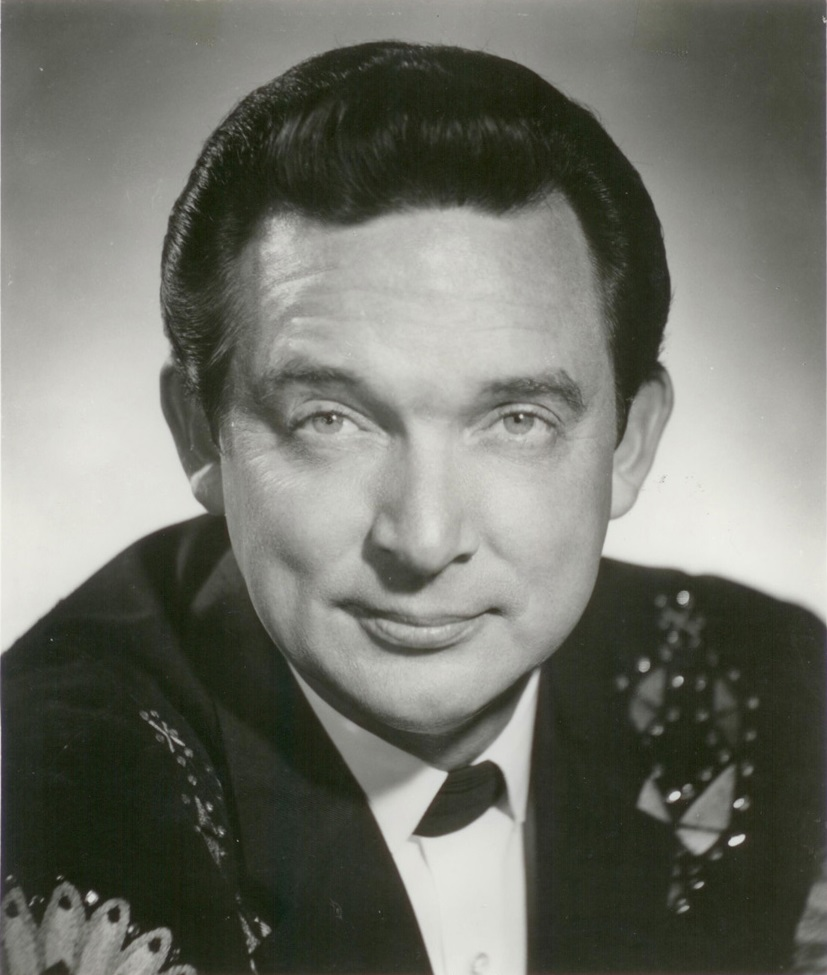
Ray Price was at number one on the first combined sales and airplay chart in October and remained in the top spot until the end of the year.

At the start of 1958, Billboard magazine published two charts specifically covering the top-performing country music songs in the United States. The C&W Best Sellers in Stores chart ranked records based on their "current national selling importance at the retail level", based on a survey of record retailers "with a high volume of sales in country and western records". The Most Played C&W by Jockeys chart ranked songs based on the "number of plays on disk jockey radio shows" according to a weekly survey of "top disk jockey shows in all key markets". With effect from the October 20 issue of Billboard the magazine discontinued both charts and combined sales and airplay into one chart called Hot C&W Sides, which has been published continuously since that date, currently under the title Hot Country Songs. In 1990 it changed to being based solely on airplay from country music radio stations, before reverting to a combined sales and airplay chart in 2012 but utilizing airplay data from stations of all formats as well as digital sales and streaming.

The number one song on the Best Sellers chart in the first issue of 1958 was "Great Balls of Fire" by Jerry Lee Lewis, and the song at the top of the Jockeys chart was "The Story of My Life" by Marty Robbins; both songs replaced "My Special Angel" by Bobby Helms, which had topped both charts the week before. Eight different singles topped the Best Sellers chart, including two each by Johnny Cash, Don Gibson and the Everly Brothers. The longest unbroken run in the top spot was eight weeks, achieved by both of Cash's chart-toppers, "Ballad of a Teenage Queen" / "Big River" and "Guess Things Happen That Way" / "Come In, Stranger"; in each case the B-side of the single was listed jointly at number one for some or all of its time in the top spot under the methodology in use at the time. The sixteen weeks which Cash spent at number one was the most for any act. Gibson's "Oh Lonesome Me" also spent eight weeks at number one, but in two separate runs. The song gave Gibson his first number-one country song and he would go on to achieve his second later in the year with "Blue Blue Day". He remained popular in the 1960s, but did not return to the top of the country singles chart until 1972.

Three singles which topped the Best Sellers chart did not reach number one on the Jockeys chart: "Great Balls of Fire" by Lewis, "Blue Blue Day" by Gibson, and "Bird Dog" / "Devoted to You" by the Everly Brothers. "Alone With You" by Faron Young had the longest unbroken run of the year on the airplay-based listing, spending 13 weeks in the top spot. Despite its popularity on the radio, the song was one of two Jockeys chart-toppers never to top the Best Sellers chart, the other being "Just Married" by Marty Robbins. The separate sales and airplay charts were published for the final time in the issue of Billboard dated October 13. The final Best Sellers number one was "Bird Dog" / "Devoted to You" and the last Jockeys chart-topper was "Alone With You". The following week the magazine launched the combined Hot C&W Sides chart, based on playlists submitted by country music radio stations and sales reports submitted by stores. The first number one on the new chart was "City Lights" by Ray Price, which in the previous issue had been at number 2 on the Best Sellers chart and number 4 on the Jockeys chart. Price's song would remain at number one for the remainder of 1958.

== Chart history ==
=== Best Sellers and Jockeys charts ===
During this period, Billboard sometimes listed both sides of a single jointly at number one on the Best Sellers chart, based on a methodology which combined the survey data for both songs if "significant action [was] reported on both sides of a record". This does not indicate that the single was officially released or promoted as a double A-side.

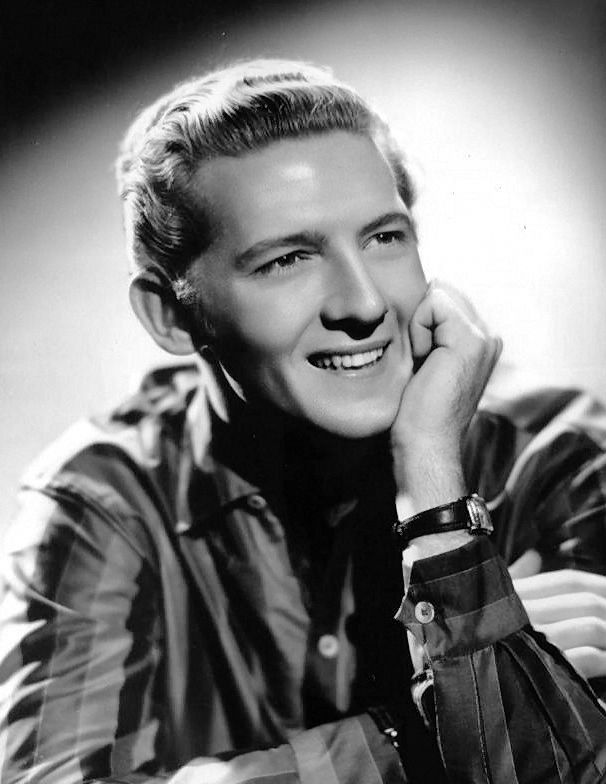
Jerry Lee Lewis had the first number one of 1958 on the Best Sellers chart.

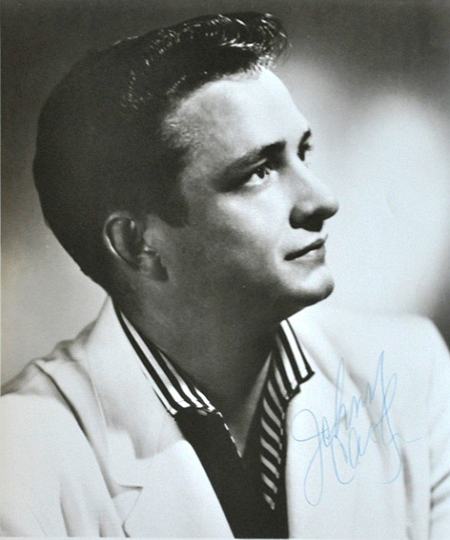
Johnny Cash topped the Best Sellers chart for a total of sixteen weeks.

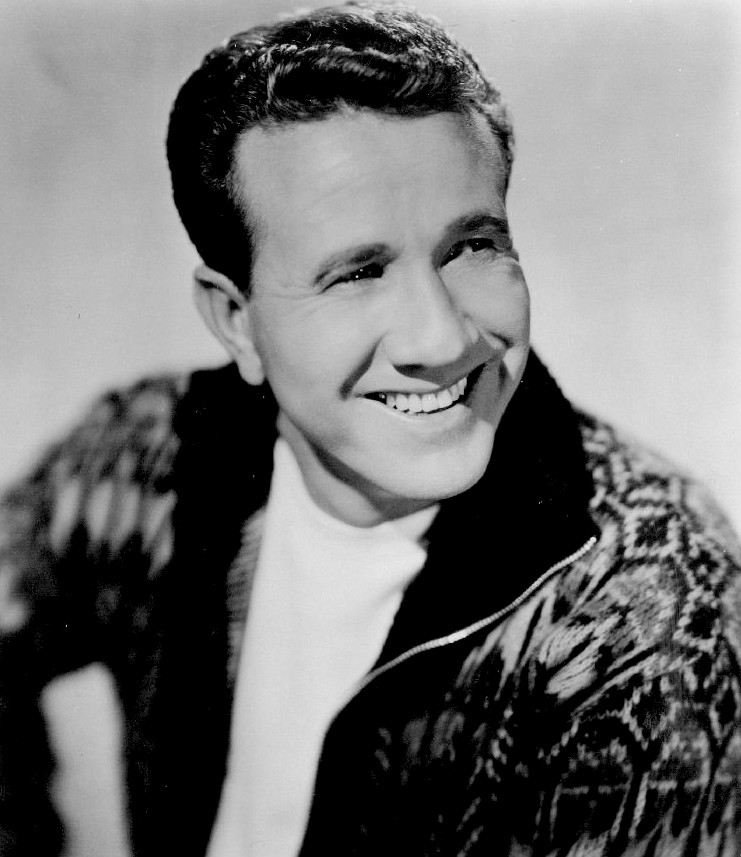
"Just Married" by Marty Robbins was a number one on the Jockeys chart but did not top the Best Sellers listing.

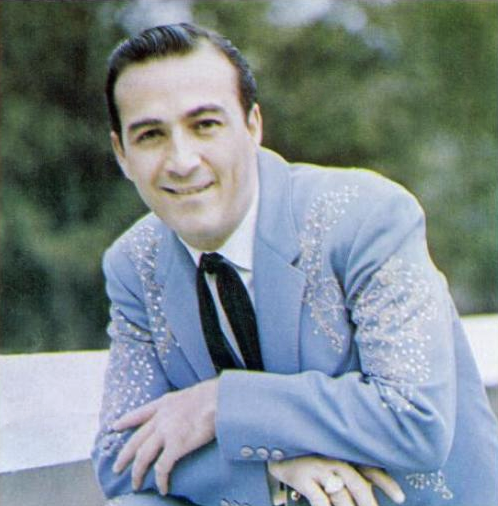
Faron Young had the final number one on the Jockeys chart.

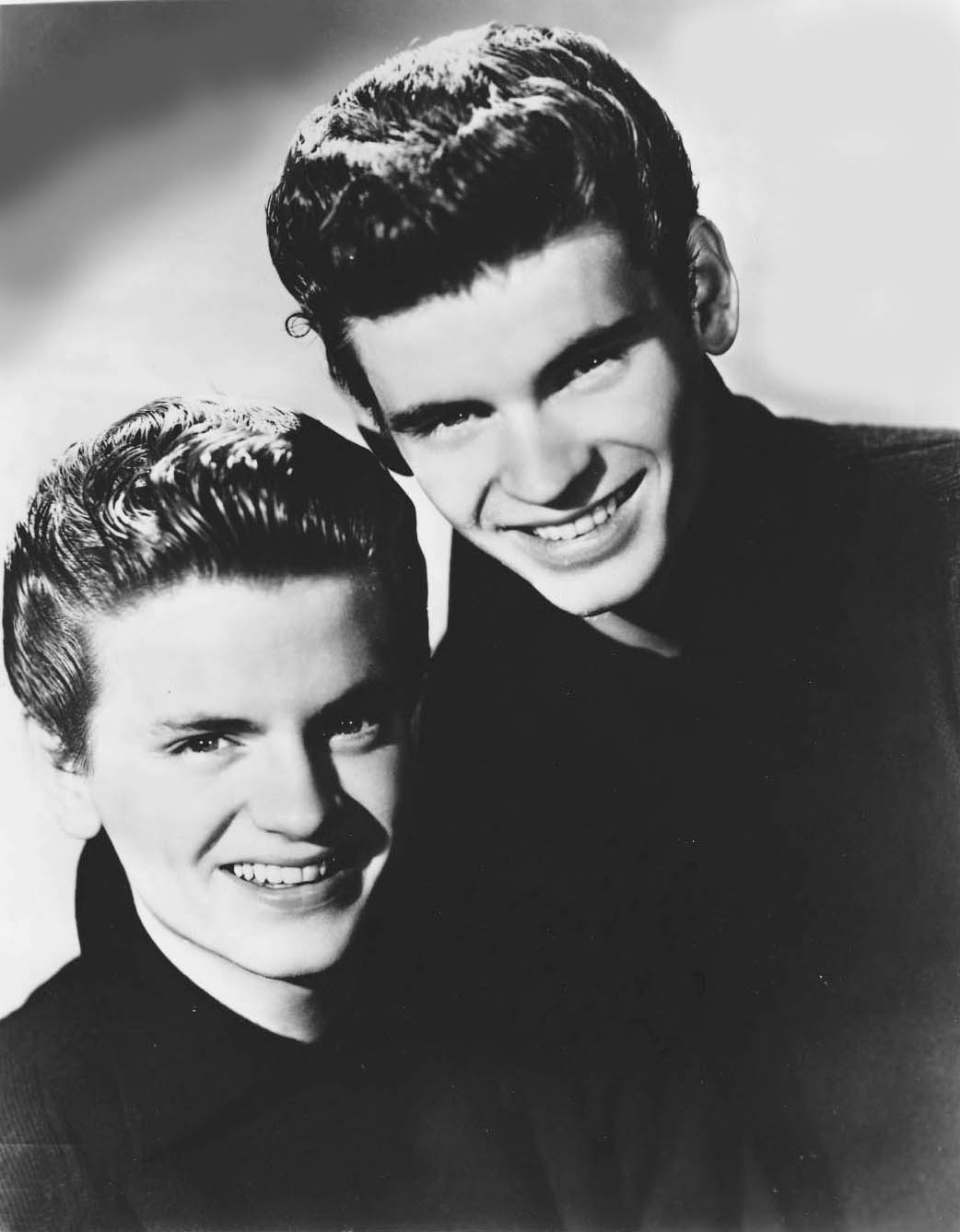
The Everly Brothers topped the final Best Sellers chart.

Best Sellers and Jockeys charts
Issue date	Best Sellers		Jockeys		Ref.
Issue date	Title	Artist(s)	Title	Artist(s)	Ref.
January 6	"Great Balls of Fire"	Jerry Lee Lewis	"The Story of My Life"	Marty Robbins	
January 13	"Great Balls of Fire"	Jerry Lee Lewis	"The Story of My Life"	Marty Robbins	
January 20	"The Story of My Life"	Marty Robbins	"The Story of My Life"	Marty Robbins	
January 27	"The Story of My Life"	Marty Robbins	"The Story of My Life"	Marty Robbins	
February 3	"The Story of My Life"	Marty Robbins	"Ballad of a Teenage Queen"	Johnny Cash	
February 10	"The Story of My Life"	Marty Robbins	"Ballad of a Teenage Queen"	Johnny Cash	
February 17	"Ballad of a Teenage Queen" / "Big River"^{[a]}	Johnny Cash	"Ballad of a Teenage Queen"	Johnny Cash	
February 24	"Ballad of a Teenage Queen" / "Big River"^{[a]}	Johnny Cash	"Ballad of a Teenage Queen"	Johnny Cash	
March 3	"Ballad of a Teenage Queen" / "Big River"^{[a]}	Johnny Cash	"Ballad of a Teenage Queen"	Johnny Cash	
March 10	"Ballad of a Teenage Queen" / "Big River"^{[a]}	Johnny Cash	"Ballad of a Teenage Queen"	Johnny Cash	
March 17	"Ballad of a Teenage Queen" / "Big River"^{[a]}	Johnny Cash	"Ballad of a Teenage Queen"	Johnny Cash	
March 24	"Ballad of a Teenage Queen" / "Big River"^{[a]}	Johnny Cash	"Ballad of a Teenage Queen"	Johnny Cash	
March 31	"Ballad of a Teenage Queen" / "Big River"^{[a]}	Johnny Cash	"Ballad of a Teenage Queen"	Johnny Cash	
April 7	"Ballad of a Teenage Queen" / "Big River"^{[a]}	Johnny Cash	"Ballad of a Teenage Queen"	Johnny Cash	
April 14	"Oh Lonesome Me" / "I Can't Stop Loving You"^{[b]}	Don Gibson	"Oh Lonesome Me"	Don Gibson	
April 21	"Oh Lonesome Me" / "I Can't Stop Loving You"^{[b]}	Don Gibson	"Oh Lonesome Me"	Don Gibson	
April 28	"Oh Lonesome Me" / "I Can't Stop Loving You"^{[b]}	Don Gibson	"Oh Lonesome Me"	Don Gibson	
May 5	"Oh Lonesome Me" / "I Can't Stop Loving You"^{[b]}	Don Gibson	"Oh Lonesome Me"	Don Gibson	
May 12	"Oh Lonesome Me" / "I Can't Stop Loving You"^{[b]}	Don Gibson	"Oh Lonesome Me"	Don Gibson	
May 19	"Oh Lonesome Me" / "I Can't Stop Loving You"^{[b]}	Don Gibson	"Oh Lonesome Me"	Don Gibson	
May 26	"Oh Lonesome Me" / "I Can't Stop Loving You"^{[b]}	Don Gibson	"Just Married"	Marty Robbins	
June 2	"All I Have to Do Is Dream" / "Claudette"^{[b]}	The Everly Brothers	"All I Have to Do Is Dream"	The Everly Brothers	
June 9	"All I Have to Do Is Dream" / "Claudette"^{[b]}	The Everly Brothers	"Just Married"	Marty Robbins	
June 16	"All I Have to Do Is Dream" / "Claudette"^{[b]}	The Everly Brothers	"Oh Lonesome Me"	Don Gibson	
June 23	"Oh Lonesome Me" / "I Can't Stop Loving You"^{[b]}	Don Gibson	"Guess Things Happen That Way"	Johnny Cash	
June 30	"Guess Things Happen That Way" / "Come In, Stranger"^{[b]}	Johnny Cash	"Oh Lonesome Me"	Don Gibson	
July 7	"Guess Things Happen That Way" / "Come In, Stranger"^{[b]}	Johnny Cash	"Guess Things Happen That Way"	Johnny Cash	
July 14	"Guess Things Happen That Way" / "Come In, Stranger"^{[b]}	Johnny Cash	"Guess Things Happen That Way"	Johnny Cash	
July 21	"Guess Things Happen That Way" / "Come In, Stranger"^{[b]}	Johnny Cash	"Alone With You"	Faron Young	
July 28	"Guess Things Happen That Way" / "Come In, Stranger"^{[b]}	Johnny Cash	"Alone With You"	Faron Young	
August 4	"Guess Things Happen That Way" / "Come In, Stranger"^{[b]}	Johnny Cash	"Alone With You"	Faron Young	
August 11	"Guess Things Happen That Way" / "Come In, Stranger"^{[b]}	Johnny Cash	"Alone With You"	Faron Young	
August 18	"Guess Things Happen That Way" / "Come In, Stranger"^{[b]}	Johnny Cash	"Alone With You"	Faron Young	
August 25	"Blue Blue Day"	Don Gibson	"Alone With You"	Faron Young	
September 1	"Blue Blue Day"	Don Gibson	"Alone With You"	Faron Young	
September 8	"Bird Dog" / "Devoted to You"^{[b]}	The Everly Brothers	"Alone With You"	Faron Young	
September 15	"Bird Dog" / "Devoted to You"^{[b]}	The Everly Brothers	"Alone With You"	Faron Young	
September 22	"Bird Dog" / "Devoted to You"^{[b]}	The Everly Brothers	"Alone With You"	Faron Young	
September 29	"Bird Dog" / "Devoted to You"^{[b]}	The Everly Brothers	"Alone With You"	Faron Young	
October 6	"Bird Dog" / "Devoted to You"^{[b]}	The Everly Brothers	"Alone With You"	Faron Young	
October 13	"Bird Dog" / "Devoted to You"^{[b]}	The Everly Brothers	"Alone With You"	Faron Young	

a. "Big River" not listed jointly at number one in the issues dated February 17, February 24 and April 7
b. Both sides listed jointly at number one

=== Hot C&W Sides ===
Hot C&W Sides
Issue date	Title	Artist(s)	Ref.
October 20	"City Lights"	Ray Price	
October 27	"City Lights"	Ray Price	
November 3	"City Lights"	Ray Price	
November 10	"City Lights"	Ray Price	
November 17	"City Lights"	Ray Price	
November 24	"City Lights"	Ray Price	
December 1	"City Lights"	Ray Price	
December 8	"City Lights"	Ray Price	
December 15	"City Lights"	Ray Price	
December 22	"City Lights"	Ray Price	
December 29	"City Lights"	Ray Price	

== See also ==
- 1958 in music
- 1958 in country music
- List of artists who reached number one on the U.S. country chart
