= Pat Boone Sings =

Compilation album by Pat Boone
- Released: 1959
- Genre: Pop
- Length: 28:04
- Label: Dot

Pat Boone compilation album chronology
Pat's Great Hits (1957)	Pat Boone Sings (1959)	Pat's Great Hits, Vol. 2 (1960)

Singles from Pat Boone Sings
- 1. "April Love" / "When the Swallows Come Back to Capistrano" Released: October 1957; 2. "A Wonderful Time Up There" / "It's Too Soon to Know" Released: January 9, 1958; 3. "Sugar Moon" / "Cherie, I Love You" Released: April 3, 1958; 4. "If Dreams Came True" / "That's How Much I Love You" Released: June 9, 1958; 5. "For My Good Fortune" / "Gee, But It's Lonely" Released: August 27, 1958; 6. "I'll Remember Tonight" / "The Mardi Gras March" Released: September 12, 1958

Professional ratings
Review scores
Source	Rating
AllMusic	4.5/5 stars
Billboard	positive ("Spotlight" pick)

Pat Boone Sings is the second greatest-hits album by Pat Boone. It was released in 1959 on Dot Records.

== Track listing ==
Side one
No.	Title	Writer(s)	Length
1.	"A Wonderful Time Up There"		2:07
2.	"If Dreams Came True"		2:44
3.	"For My Good Fortune"		2:09
4.	"Cherie, I Love You"		2:25
5.	"When the Swallows Come Back to Capistrano"		2:36
6.	"Sugar Moon"	Danny Wolfe	1:56

Side two
No.	Title	Length
1.	"It's Too Soon to Know"	2:39
2.	"April Love"	2:44
3.	"Gee, But It's Lonely"	2:13
4.	"That's How Much I Love You"	1:57
5.	"The Mardi Gras March"	2:08
6.	"I'll Remember Tonight"	2:26
