= (It's Gonna Be a) Lonely Christmas =

1948 Christmas song by The Orioles

"(It's Gonna Be a) Lonely Christmas" is a Christmas song recorded by The Orioles in 1948. It was their second hit (following "It's Too Soon to Know"), reaching position #8 on Billboard's Juke Box charts in December 1948, and #5 the following Christmas.
