= Sugar Moon =

Sugar Moon may refer to:

- Sugar Moon (Bob Wills song)
- Sugar Moon (Pat Boone song)
- Maple syrup#History, rituals around syrup-making, celebrating the Sugar Moon, the first full moon of spring
