= Crying in the Chapel =

1953 single by Darrell Glenn

- 1953 sheet music cover with Darrell Glenn

Single by Darrell Glenn
- B-side: "Hang Up That Telephone"
- Released: May 1953
- Recorded: 1953
- Genre: Country
- Length: 2:52
- Label: Valley
- Songwriter: Artie Glenn
- Producer: Artie Glenn

Darrell Glenn singles chronology
"Write And Tell Me Why" (1953)	"Crying in the Chapel" (1953)	"I Think I'm Falling In Love With You" (1953)

"Crying in the Chapel"

Single by June Valli
- Released: June 20, 1953
- Recorded: 1953
- Genre: Traditional pop
- Length: 2:45
- Label: RCA Victor
- Songwriter: Artie Glenn

June Valli singles chronology
"Strange Sensation" (1952)	"Crying in the Chapel" (1953)	"I Understand" (1954)

"Crying in the Chapel"

Single by The Orioles
- B-side: "Don't You Think I Ought to Know"
- Released: July 1953
- Recorded: 1953
- Genre: Doo-wop
- Length: 3:03
- Label: Jubilee
- Songwriter: Artie Glenn

The Orioles singles chronology
"I Cover the Waterfront" (1953)	"Crying in the Chapel" (1953)	"In the Mission of St. Augustine" (1953)

"Crying in the Chapel"

Single by Rex Allen
- B-side: "I Thank the Lord"
- Released: August 1, 1953
- Recorded: 1953
- Genre: Country
- Length: 3:07
- Label: Decca
- Songwriter: Artie Glenn

Rex Allen singles chronology
"Sparrow in the Treetop" (1951)	"Crying in the Chapel" (1953)	"Marines, Let's Go" (1961)

"Crying in the Chapel" is a song written by Artie Glenn and recorded by his son Darrell Glenn. The song was released in 1953 and reached number six on the Billboard chart.

The song has also been recorded by many artists including the Orioles and June Valli, but the most successful version was by Elvis Presley, whose recording reached number three in the US, and number one in the UK in 1965.

== Background ==
According to Artie Glenn's youngest son, Larry, the song was inspired by a personal experience his father had, and the chapel in the title was the Loving Avenue Baptist Church in Fort Worth, Texas. By this account, Glenn had suffered a serious back problem, and while in hospital, he bargained with God that he would become a better person if God helped him recover. He recuperated from a successful spinal surgery, and when he was released from hospital, he went to pray at the nearest chapel he could find. While in the chapel, he started shedding tears of joy, which was witnessed by the pastor. The inspiration for the song then came to him, by the time he was back home, he had the basic tune and the chorus, and that evening he finished the rest of the song.

Glenn's son Darrell recorded a demo of the song. The song, however, was rejected by a number of publishers, and the song sat unreleased for some time. The song was eventually published by Valley Publishers, while a small independent label Valley Records from Knoxville released the recording as a single.

=== 1953 releases ===
Darrell Glenn was the first to record the song while still in high school, backed by his father's band the Rhythm Riders. This original version of the song was issued in May 1953. The song became a local hit in Fort Worth, Texas, and then it went nationwide. It quickly gained the attention of other artists who then recorded the song.

Many different versions of the song in a variety of genres were released in the summer of 1953, and they appeared in multiple genre charts. Four versions (Glenn, Rex Allen, the Orioles and June Valli) reached Billboard's best-selling popular records chart at the same time in August, while two versions (Glenn, Allen) also reached the country and western best-selling record chart, and one (the Orioles) on the rhythm and blues chart in the same month. Ella Fitzgerald and the Ray Charles Singers also recorded a Jazz version (flip side of her "When the Hands of the Clock Pray at Midnight", Decca 28762), while Rosetta Tharpe recorded a spiritual version. All versions sold over a combined million copies by August 1953 before they peaked in the charts.

Glenn's original recording was the first to appear in Billboard's Top Popular Records as well as the country and western charts in July 1953, eventually reaching number six on Billboard pop singles chart, and number four on the Billboard country and western chart. The version by Rex Allen reached number eight, the Orioles' number 11, Ella Fitzgerald number 15, and Art Lund reached number 23. On the Cash Box chart where versions by Glenn, June Valli, the Orioles and Rex Allen were amalgamated, the song reached number one. In the UK, Lee Lawrence took his version to number 7.

June Valli recorded her version with an orchestra directed by Joe Reisman in New York City on June 11, 1953. RCA Victor Records released it as a single in the U.S. (catalog umber 20–5368). and elsewhere by EMI on the His Master's Voice label (catalog number B. 10568). This was the most successful pop version on the Billboard charts in 1953, peaking at number four charting for a total of 17 weeks beginning August 1, 1953. Valli's version was the 24th best-selling song of 1953, while the song itself was ranked 10th in 1953's top tune.

The doo-wop version recorded by the Orioles was the group's biggest success in the charts and their only million seller. The Orioles' version went to number one on the R&B chart and number eleven on the pop chart. It became one of the best-known versions and was included on the soundtracks of a number of films, including American Graffiti in 1973, Just Cause in 1995, and Revolutionary Road in 2008.

The song was among the first songs to receive a Million-Airs award from BMI in 1979 for over a million airplays.

== Elvis Presley version ==
"Crying in the Chapel"

Single by Elvis Presley

from the album How Great Thou Art
- B-side: "I Believe in the Man in the Sky"
- Released: April 6, 1965
- Recorded: October 31, 1960
- Studio: RCA Studio B, Nashville
- Genre: Gospel
- Length: 2:26
- Label: RCA Victor
- Songwriter: Artie Glenn
- Producer: Steve Sholes

Elvis Presley singles chronology
"Do the Clam" (1965)	"Crying in the Chapel" (1965)	"(Such an) Easy Question" / "It Feels So Right" (1965)

Audio
- "Crying in the Chapel" on YouTube

On October 31, 1960, Elvis Presley cut a version of the song with plans to put it on his RCA gospel album His Hand in Mine. Three takes were recorded, but neither Elvis nor the Jordanaires, who provided background vocals, were satisfied. Eventually, it was decided to shelve the recordings and move on.

On April 6, 1965, "Crying In the Chapel" was issued on RCA's "Gold Standard Series." It became Elvis' first million seller since "Return to Sender" in 1962 and his greatest chart success over a six-year span. The single hit number three on the Billboard Hot 100 singles chart and topped the Easy Listening chart for seven weeks. It was later included as a bonus track on Presley's 1967 gospel album, How Great Thou Art.

Presley's version also was a hit in the United Kingdom, where it spent two non-consecutive weeks at number one.

=== Charts ===
==== Weekly charts ====
Chart (1965)	Peak position
Australia (Kent Music Report)	1
Belgium (Ultratop 50 Flanders)	4
Belgium (Ultratop 50 Wallonia)	16
Canada RPM Top Singles	3
Denmark	2
Ireland (IRMA)	1
Italy	1
Netherlands (Single Top 100)	6
New Zealand	3
Norway (VG-lista)	1
South Africa (Springbok)	1
Spain	7
Sweden	2
UK Singles (OCC)	1
U.S. Billboard Hot 100	3
U.S. Billboard Adult Contemporary	1
U.S. Cash Box Top 100	4
West Germany (GfK)	23

Chart (1977)	Peak position
UK Singles (OCC)	43

Chart (2005)	Peak position
Ireland (IRMA)	26
UK Singles (OCC)	2

==== Year-end charts ====
Chart (1965)	Rank
UK	12
U.S. Billboard Hot 100	9
U.S. Cash Box	12

== Bob Marley & the Wailers version ==
In April 1968, the vocal trio the Wailers, featuring Bob Marley on lead vocals and guitar, Rita Marley (replacing Bunny Wailer) and Peter Tosh on harmony vocals, backed by Rastafarian nyabinghi percussion group Ras Michael & the Sons of Negus recorded an adapted version of the song in Kingston, Jamaica. Its lyrics were adapted from the Orioles' version by Rasta leader Mortimo Planno, who also produced and pressed the single entitled "Selassie Is the Chapel", the first ever Rastafarian song recorded and released by Marley. The song is thus meaningful to Rastafarians as its lyrics were modified in order to affirm the divinity of Haile Selassie as the born again Christ.

Only a few hundred copies of the single were pressed on a blank label at the time, making it a much sought-after rarity for decades. It was finally reissued and documented on CD on the album Selassie Is the Chapel (JAD Records, 1997), as part of the Complete Bob Marley & the Wailers 1967 to 1972 series produced by Bruno Blum and Roger Steffens. A vinyl single was also released by JAD in 2002. The recording was reissued on that single along with the original Mortimo Planno-voiced flip side, Rastafarian cult song "A Little Prayer" as well as on the 2002 four CD Marley Rebel anthology set released in France only and deleted in 2003. A "Selassie Is the Chapel" remix produced by Blum, with a contribution by The Wailers, was released on the European Rastafari label in 1998 (and the Jamaican Human Race label a few years later) as "War/Selassie Is the Chapel". They feature a virtual duet between Marley and Ethiopian emperor Selassie in medley style. This duet version single hit number one in the UK Echoes magazine in April 1998.

== Other versions ==
More than 50 artists worldwide have released a version of "Crying in the Chapel".

- Arne Alm wrote the Swedish lyrics. Raya Avellan and Yngve Stoors Hawaiiorkester recorded "Klockorna i dalen" in Stockholm on October 10, 1953. The song was released on the 78 rpm record Cupol 4780.
- Ken Griffin recorded a version in 1953
- Johnny Burnette included it on his self-titled 1961 album
- Mahalia Jackson recorded a version in 1962 with Orchestra and Chorus conducted by Johnny Williams
- Little Richard recorded a version in 1963 for Atlantic Records, which became a "Regional" hit on the Billboard Chart
- Carol Fran recorded a version in 1964 for Port Records
- The Platters recorded a version in 1964 for Mercury Records
- Santo & Johnny included the song on their 1964 album, In the Still of the Night
- In 1965, the Argentinian vocal group "Los 5 Latinos" with Estela Raval on the leading voice, recorded a Spanish version of the song, entitled "Llorando en la capilla", included in their album, El Show. Vol. 2
- In 1965, Taiwanese singer Chen Lee Qing recorded the Chinese version of the song titled 教堂淚影. One year later Singaporean singer Huang Qing Yuan also recorded the same Chinese version of the song.
- In 1966 the Venezuelan singer Mirtha Perez made a local hit of this song in her first album as soloist, Mirtha Solita, entitled "Llorando en la capilla", with arrangements by the director Jose Gay and using as background vocals the members of group "Hermanos O Brien", after, Las 4 monedas
- Don McLean recorded a version of the song on his Homeless Brother album (1974)
- Allies, a Christian rock band, recorded a version of the song on their album, Long Way From Paradise (1989)

== Bibliography ==
- Roy Carr & Mick Farren: Elvis: The Illustrated Record (Harmony Books, 1982), pp. 97, 106.
