= Darrell Glenn =

American singer-songwriter

- Born: Darrell Orvis Glenn; December 7, 1935
- Died: April 9, 1990 (aged 54)
- Occupations: Singer; songwriter
- Labels: Valley Records

Darrell Orvis Glenn (December 7, 1935 – April 9, 1990) was an American singer and songwriter. He first made his mark in the music business with his recording of "Crying in the Chapel" released in 1953, written by his father, Artie Glenn. He also wrote songs recorded by other artists, including Elvis Presley.

== Early life ==
Darrel Glenn was born to Foy and Artie Glenn in 1935. The family moved to Fort Worth, Texas, where he attended J. P. Elder Junior High and Fort Worth Technical High School. He won a talent contest in Waco, Texas, where the award was an opportunity to record with Bob Wills. He released "Crying in the Chapel" when he was 17 before he graduated in June 1953.

== Career ==
His early recordings appeared on the Valley Records label out of Knoxville, Tennessee, produced by Floyd Wilson, who penned one of Glenn's best recordings, "I Think I'm Falling In Love With You". Glenn's recording of "Crying in the Chapel" was originally recorded as a demo in professional studios in Ft. Worth, Texas, for the purpose of his father, Artie, to place the song with a publisher. The song was eventually accepted by Valley Publishers, who agreed to release the same demo recording as their first Valley Records release in 1953. The recording was too long to be released as a single, and a piano break was edited out, and the edited demo record was then released as the single. The song quickly became a hit. Glenn was still a student when the song was released, and after Glenn graduated, he went on a tour in the United States and Canada. Later he also toured with Bob Hope.

"Crying in the Chapel" was covered in the pop field by June Valli (RCA), Sonny Til & the Orioles (Jubilee) in the R&B field and some ten or so years later by Elvis Presley (RCA); all versions became major hits. In 1959, Glenn re-recorded "Crying in the Chapel" for National Recording Corporation as the title track of an album of inspirational songs. Background artists who appeared on Darrell Glenn's NRC Records included Joe South, Ray Stevens, and Jerry Reed.

Glenn made regular appearances in Bewley Barn Dance, also appearing in the Big D Jamboree. He joined as vocalist a group called the Commodores, which had a local hit titled "Uranium" written by Glenn's father Artie in 1955.

Glenn wrote a number of songs recorded by other artists; among these are the 1967 Elvis 45 release of Indescribably Blue, "Bear With Me a Little Longer" by Eddy Arnold; and "Only the Redeemed" by Kenneth Copeland, which received a Grammy nomination. He also wrote for an album of gospel songs by Copeland.

Glenn was co-owner of Glendale Records, and was also involved in other labels, including serving as the head of A&R with Pompeii Records in 1968.

Glenn became an evangelist in the 1970s.

== Death ==
Glenn died on April 9, 1990, from cancer in Fort Worth at the age of 54. He was buried in Bluebonnet Hills Memorial Park in Colleyville, Texas.
