= The Four Esquires =

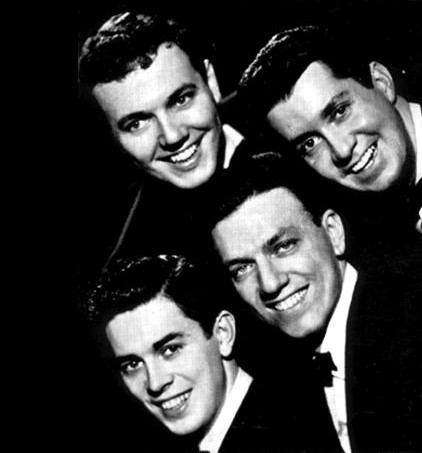
The group in 1957

The Four Esquires were an American vocal quartet from Boston, Massachusetts, United States. The original four members were all students at the Boston University. Following the completion of their studies, they were signed in March 1956 by London Records. Their version of "Look Homeward Angel" was notable, but any possibility of a chart entry was snuffed out by Johnnie Ray's version of the same track.

They did have two hit singles in the United States in the late 1950s, both on Paris Records. The first, "Love Me Forever", featured orchestral backing by Sid Bass with vocal enhancement from a female session vocalist (Rosemary June), and peaked at No. 25 on the Billboard Hot 100 in 1957. It also reached No. 23 on the UK Singles Chart. In the US, Eydie Gormé's cover charted higher, whilst in the UK it was outsold by Marion Ryan's version. The Four Esquires second hit, "Hideaway", had orchestral accompaniment by Richard Hayman, and peaked at No. 21 in the US in 1958.

In 1963, the group performed a vocal cover version of the "James Bond Theme". They disbanded shortly afterwards.

== Members ==
- Bill Courtney
- Frank Mahoney (Francis Mahony; died 2007; served in World War II as interpreter; active in Alcoholics Anonymous in Boston area from early 1980s through 2007)
- Wally Gold (died June 7, 1998)
- Bob Golden a.k.a. Robert Colligan
- William Powers
