= Gary Stites =

American pop singer (1940–2026)

Gary Stites (July 23, 1940 – March 6, 2026) was an American pop singer who enjoyed brief success in the late 1950s.

== Life and career ==
Stites was born in Colorado on July 23, 1940. He is best remembered for his top 40 hit, "Lonely for You", which bore a significant sonic resemblance to the Conway Twitty song "It's Only Make Believe". The tune peaked at No. 24 on the Billboard Hot 100 in 1959, and a follow-up single, "Starry Eyed", peaked at No. 77 later that same year. It would hit the No. 1 spot in the UK for Michael Holliday. Stites released a full-length album on Carlton Records in 1960, but it was his only LP.

Stites died in Wilmington, Delaware on March 6, 2026, at the age of 85.
