= Gee, But It's Lonely =

Single by Pat Boone

from the album Pat Boone Sings
- A-side: "For My Good Fortune"
- Released: 1958
- Recorded: 1958
- Length: 2:17
- Label: Dot
- Songwriter: Phil Everly

Pat Boone singles chronology
"If Dreams Came True" / "That's How Much I Love You" (1958)	"Gee, But It's Lonely" / "For My Good Fortune" (1958)	"I'll Remember Tonight" (1958)

"Gee, But It's Lonely" is a song by Pat Boone that reached number 21 on the Billboard Hot 100 in 1958. The song was written by Phil Everly of The Everly Brothers

== Track listing ==
7" single (Dot 45-15825, 1958)
No.	Title	Length
1.	"Gee, But It's Lonely"	2:17
2.	"For My Good Fortune"	2:09

== Charts ==
Chart (1958)	Peak position
UK Singles (Official Charts)	30
US Billboard Hot 100	21
