= Crying Over You (Webb Pierce song) =

Single by Webb Pierce
- B-side: "You'll Come Back"
- Released: April 24, 1958
- Recorded: 1958
- Genre: Country
- Length: 2:22
- Label: Decca
- Songwriter(s): Al Peshoff, Mark Dee

"Crying Over You" is a song written by Al Peshoff and Mark Dee, sung by Webb Pierce, and released on the Decca label. In May 1958, it peaked at No. 3 on Billboard's country and western jockey chart. It spent 17 weeks on the charts and was also ranked No. 31 on Billboard's 1958 year-end country and western chart.

== See also ==
- Billboard year-end top 50 country & western singles of 1958
