= The Orioles =

American R&B music group

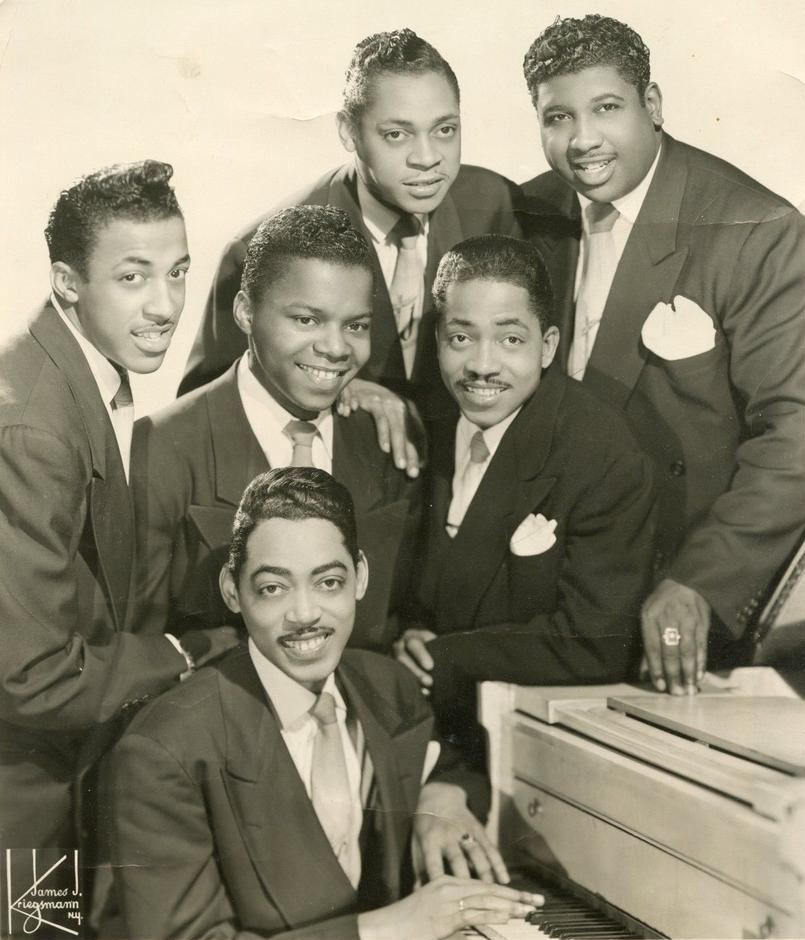

Background information
- Also known as: The Vibra-Naires, Sonny Til and his New Orioles
- Origin: Baltimore, Maryland, United States
- Genres: R&B
- Years active: 1946–1955
- Labels: It's a Natural, Vee-Jay
- Members: David Warren, Ray Apollo, Clark Walker
- Past members: Diz Russell, Sonny Til, Alexander Sharp, George Nelson, Johnny Reed, Tommy Gaither, Ralph Williams, Charlie Harris, Gregory Carroll, Chauncy Westbrook, Maurice Hicks, Tex Cornelius, Jerry Holeman, Billy Adams, Paul Griffin, Frank Todd, Jimmy Brown, Delton McCall, Billy Taylor, Gerald Gregory, Lawrence Joyner, Bobby Thomas, Clarence Young, Mike Robinson, Eddie Palmer, Eddie Jones, Skip Mahoney, Dwight Datcher

The Orioles were an American R&B group in the late 1940s and early 1950s. One of the first vocal groups in R&B, they were early pioneers of the doo-wop sound.

Dubbing themselves after Maryland's state bird, the Orioles started the trend of bird groups (The Cardinals, The Crows, The Flamingos, The Larks, The Penguins, The Ravens, The Wrens, etc.). They brought their winning formula to their first charted hit "It's Too Soon to Know"; a number one record in November 1948, soon followed by the group's second hit, "(It's Gonna Be a) Lonely Christmas", in December that same year.

== Original members ==
- Sonny Til (born Earlington Carl Tilghman, August 18, 1928, Baltimore, Maryland — died December 9, 1981, Washington, D.C.) (lead tenor)
- Alexander Sharp (born December 1919, Baltimore — died January 3, 1970) (high tenor)
- George Nelson (born 1925, Baltimore — died June 30, 1959) (baritone)
- Johnny Reed (born August 16, 1923, Baltimore — died June 18, 2005) (bass vocals and double bass)
- Lloyd Thomas "Tommy" Gaither III (born March 5, 1920, Baltimore — died November 5, 1950, Baltimore) (guitar)

== Early years ==
Around 1947, Sonny Til sang regularly in amateur shows at the Avenue Cafe in Baltimore, where he met Nelson, Sharp and Gaither. They decided to form a group, calling themselves The Vibra-Naires, and aspiring songwriter Deborah Chessler became their manager. In April 1948 the group appeared on the Arthur Godfrey radio talent show in New York City, with Richard Williams as bass singer, but he was then replaced by Johnny Reed.

The group won a recording deal with the "It's A Natural" record label, a subsidiary of Jubilee Records, and changed their name to The Orioles in honor of the state bird of Maryland and in emulation of another popular group, The Ravens. In July 1948, they recorded Chessler's song "It's Too Soon to Know", with Sonny Til taking lead vocals. The record reportedly sold 30,000 copies in its first week, rising to number one on the national R&B chart in November 1948, and leading to cover versions by artists such as the Ravens, Ella Fitzgerald and Dinah Washington. It was also one of the first "race" songs to cross over into mainstream markets, reaching number 13 on the pop chart.

The Orioles then began touring widely, and started recording for the Jubilee label. Their next smash hit was "Tell Me So" in 1949, which again reached number one in the R&B chart but this time failed to cross to the pop chart. Other hits included "Forgive And Forget" and "Lonely Christmas".

In performance, The Orioles were a phenomenon, with girls in the audiences screaming, fainting, and attempting to reach their idol Sonny Til in particular. They differed from groups like the Mills Brothers and the Delta Rhythm Boys in that they made vocal music with limited orchestration and accompanied only with the guitar of Tommy Gaither and the bass Johnny Reed. From 1948 to 1954, they cut over 120 sides for the Natural and Jubilee labels. By late 1950 they were major stars, although their supply of hit records had dried up.

Tragedy struck in November 1950. The group was traveling in two cars near Baltimore. Gaither drove one, with Reed and Nelson as passengers. He took a corner too fast and lost control of the car, which rolled down an embankment and crashed into a drive-in restaurant. Gaither was killed and Nelson and Reed were severely injured. Til and Sharp, in the other car, were not near enough to witness the accident and only heard about it when they arrived home.

For a short time, only Til and Sharp performed as the Orioles, but soon added two new members, guitarist/second tenor Ralph Williams and pianist Charlie Harris. Nelson returned in a few days, and Reed a few weeks later. Just a year after their tragic accident, the group were involved in another accident in Akron, Ohio, but there were no injuries. In 1952, they had another R&B hit with blues song "Baby, Please Don't Go", which was an early 45 rpm issue available only on red vinyl.

Early in 1953, George Nelson, who had a drinking problem, left the Orioles, and was replaced by John "Gregory" Carroll, formerly of another Baltimore group, the Four Buddies. In June 1953, they recorded a version of Darrell Glenn's country song "Crying in the Chapel". This was to become The Orioles' biggest hit, staying atnumber one in the R&B chart for five weeks in August and September, and reaching number 11 on the pop chart. it sold over one million copies and was awarded a gold disc. It was also to be their last big hit, with only a version of "In The Mission Of St. Augustine" later in the year reaching the R&B charts.

Williams left the group briefly in late 1953, and in 1954 the group's manager Deborah Chessler quit. In February 1955, Reed left and eventually joined a version of The Ink Spots. He was replaced by Maurice Hicks. Williams and Harris left soon after. The group continued a short time, but then disbanded.

== Later years ==
Left without the Orioles, Til picked up another group, the Regals, whose members were Tex Cornelius, Diz Russell, Jerry Holeman, Billy Adams, and pianist Paul Griffin. This group became the New Orioles. Til liked the Regals' modern harmony style, and the existing tunes were rearranged to match the Regals' style (in many cases, sounding rather different than they formerly had). During this time, they were often billed as "Sonny Til and his New Orioles". They left Jubilee and signed with Vee-Jay Records.

They continued with this arrangement until 1957 when Cornelius left the group. He was replaced for a short time by Frank Todd, who was replaced by Jimmy Brown. This line-up went until the last day of 1959. Holeman left the group, and Russel the next day, after finding Sonny's car (their means of transportation) repossessed. This was the end of the second Orioles.

Til recorded briefly as a solo artist before putting together the third Orioles group, with members Delton McCall, Billy Taylor, and Gerald Gregory, former bass of The Spaniels. They continued recording, this time for Charlie Parker Records. Gregory left after a couple of years and was replaced by Lawrence Joyner. This group split up in the mid 1960s.

In 1966, Til met Bobby Thomas, a long time Orioles fan. Bobby was singing in a group known as the Vibrannaires — coincidentally the same as the Orioles' original name. This group consisted of Thomas, Clarence Young, Harry Accoo, and Mike Robinson. Thomas, Young, and Robinson joined Til to become the fourth Orioles group. Gregory Carroll was occasionally a member of this group. They recorded until 1975.

Following the breakup of that Orioles group, Til joined George Holmes' Ink Spots, who were Til, Holmes, Ann Lawson, and Larry Reed. With the addition of George "Pepi" Grant in 1977, they began touring as both The Ink Spots and The Orioles (as the Orioles, Lawson was billed as a special guest). Til and Grant alternated leads, and Holmes sang bass. They recorded briefly in 1977.

In 1977, Til formed the sixth Orioles group with former members: Diz Russell and Jerry Holeman from the second group, and Billy Taylor from the third group. The group also sometimes featured Eddie Palmer. This group was together in 1981, when Til died from a heart attack. He was 53.

The group continued, and by the late 1990s featured Russell, Reese Palmer, Skip Mahoney, Larry Jordan and musical director Eddie Jones, who also works with The Cadillacs. Jones and Mahoney were later replaced by George Spann and Royal Height. Bobby Thomas started his own Orioles group following Til's death. Johnny Reed played with this group until his death in June 2005.

Bobby Thomas died on May 3, 2012, from complications of diabetes at the age of 77. John Gregory Carroll died on January 25, 2013, in Creston.

Lead singer Albert "Diz" Russell died November 16, 2016, from congestive heart failure at the age of 83.

Dwight Datcher died on November 23, 2019

Skip Mahoney died on March 20, 2020

== Recognition ==
The original five members of The Orioles were inducted into the Rock and Roll Hall of Fame in 1995 as early influences.

Both groups were featured in the PBS special Doo Wop 51 in 2000, with the groups alternating verses on "Crying in the Chapel" (with Bobby Thomas and Larry Jordan on lead).

In 2015 the musical theater production, Soul Harmony, telling the story of Deborah Chessler, Sonny Til, and the Orioles, premiered in Portland, Oregon.

They were inducted into the Vocal Group Hall of Fame in 1998.
