= For My Good Fortune =

Single by Pat Boone

from the album Pat Boone Sings
- A-side: "Gee, But It's Lonely"
- Released: 1958
- Recorded: 1958
- Length: 2:17
- Label: Dot
- Songwriter(s): Blackwell, Stevens

Pat Boone singles chronology
| "If Dreams Came True" / "That's How Much I Love You" (1958) | "For My Good Fortune" / "Gee, But It's Lonely" (1958) | "I'll Remember Tonight" (1958) |

"For My Good Fortune" is a song by Pat Boone that reached number 23 on the Billboard Hot 100 in 1958.

== Track listing ==
7" single (Dot 45-15825, 1958)
| No. | Title | Length |
|---|---|---|
| 1. | "Gee, But It's Lonely" | 2:17 |
| 2. | "For My Good Fortune" | 2:09 |

== Charts ==
| Chart (1958) | Peak position |
|---|---|
| US Billboard Hot 100 | 23 |
