= Stairway of Love =

Single by Marty Robbins
- Released: 1958
- Genre: Country
- Label: Columbia
- Songwriter(s): Sid Tepper, Roy C. Bennett

"Stairway of Love" is a song written by Sid Tepper and Roy C. Bennett, sung by Marty Robbins (with Ray Coniff and His Orchestra), and released on the Columbia label. In April 1958, it peaked at No. 2 on Billboard's country and western best seller chart and spent a total of 25 weeks on the charts. It was the "B" side to "Just Married", and the record ranked No. 2 on Billboard's 1958 year-end country and western chart.

In the UK, there were cover versions by Alma Cogan, Michael Holliday and by Terry Dene. The Holliday version was the most successful reaching No. 3 in the UK charts. The Dene record also charted in the #16 position.

== See also ==
- Billboard year-end top 50 country & western singles of 1958
