= Starry Eyed (Michael Holliday song) =

Single by Michael Holliday
- B-side: "The Steady Game"
- Released: 1960
- Genre: Pop; teen pop
- Length: 2:07
- Label: Columbia 45-DB 4378
- Songwriter(s): Earl Shuman, Mort Garson

Michael Holliday singles chronology
"Life Is A Circus" (1959)	"Starry Eyed" (1960)	"Skylark" (1960)

"Starry Eyed" is a Michael Holliday song that became the UK No. 1 single on 29 January 1960. It was written by Earl Shuman and Mort Garson and produced by Norrie Paramor. Entering the charts dated 1 January 1960, it spent 12 weeks there altogether. It was the first UK No. 1 single of the 1960s. The previous year the song was a follow-up single for American singer Gary Stites, where it was a minor success with US audiences.
