= June Valli =

American singer (1928–1993)

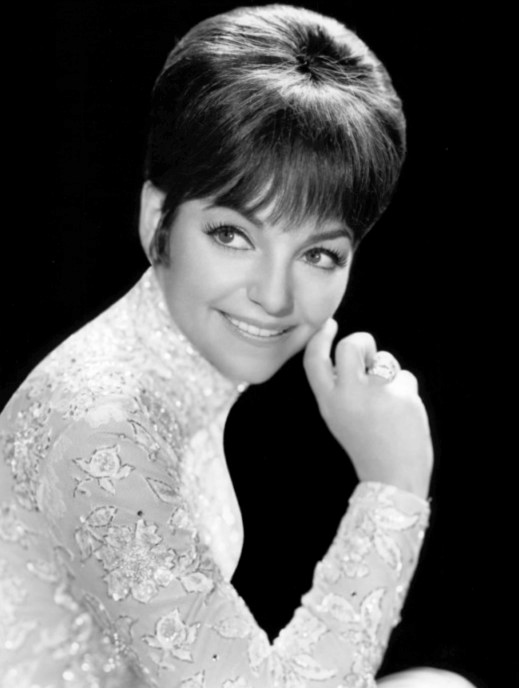
- Valli in 1966

Background information
- Born: June Foglia; June 30, 1928; The Bronx, New York City, U.S.
- Died: March 12, 1993 (aged 64) Fort Lee, New Jersey, U.S.
- Genres: Traditional pop
- Occupations: Vocalist; Television personality

June Valli (née Foglia; June 30, 1928 – March 12, 1993) was an American singer and television personality.

== Early years ==
Born in the Bronx, Valli's father was Italian, and her mother was Austrian. She worked as a bookkeeper after her graduation from Washington Irving High School. Her singing of Stormy Weather at a friend's wedding reception led to an appearance on Arthur Godfrey's Talent Scouts, where she won. She subsequently appeared on Perry Como's and Ed Sullivan's TV shows.

== Television ==
Valli was one of the stars of the 1950s television shows Stop the Music and Your Hit Parade. She sang on the latter show during its 1952–1953 season. At the start of the 1953–1954 season, she was replaced by singer Gisele MacKenzie.

Donald Swerdlow and his 12-year-old Bronx friends, students at Public School 6 were asked by June's manager to start a fan club for her. They did this and paraded in front of a TV studio carrying "picket signs" promoting her recordings of "Now Now Now" (an American version of the Israeli favorite, Hava Nagila, and the record's flip-side, "Always Always."

In 1957, Valli and Andy Williams were co-hosts of The Andy Williams-June Valli Show, a summer replacement program on NBC-TV. A newspaper article noted, "It's her first chance in three years to settle down in one place."

== Recordings ==
Valli recorded a number of hit songs, including "Strange Sensation", "A Shoulder to Cry On", "Crying in the Chapel", "Why Don't You Believe Me?" and "Unchained Melody". Throughout her career, she sang with various stars of the time, including Mel Torme and Fats Domino. Valli was also the singing voice in a series of commercials for Chiquita Bananas.

== Private life ==
Valli was married to famed WIND (AM) Chicago disc jockey Howard Miller for two years—a union that she called "my biggest mistake." She later married Jim Merchant for 28 years.

== Death ==
Valli died of cancer on March 12, 1993, at her home in Fort Lee, New Jersey.

== Charted Singles ==
| Year | Title | Chart positions |
| Year | Title | US |
|---|---|---|
| 1952 | "Strange Sensation" | 23 |
| 1953 | "Crying in the Chapel" | 4 |
| 1954 | "I Understand" | 8 |
| 1954 | "Tell Me, Tell Me" | 16 |
| 1955 | "Unchained Melody" | 29 |
| 1958 | "The Wedding" | 43 |
| 1959 | "The Answer to a Maiden's Prayer" | 71 |
| 1960 | "Apple Green" | 29 |
| 1961 | "This World We Live In" | — |
