= Please Help Me, I'm Falling (album) =

Studio album by Hank Locklin
- Released: July 1960
- Recorded: December 1956 – January 1960, RCA Victor Studio, Nashville, TN
- Genre: Country
- Label: RCA Victor
- Producer: Chet Atkins

Hank Locklin chronology
Foreign Love (1958)	Please Help Me, I'm Falling (1960)	Happy Journey (1962)

Professional ratings
Review scores
Source	Rating
Allmusic	link

Please Help Me, I'm Falling is the title of a recording by American country music singer Hank Locklin, released in 1960. It marks Locklin's first release considered part of the Nashville Sound.

Included are Locklin's previous hit singles "Send Me the Pillow That You Dream On", "Livin' Alone", "It's a Little More Like Heaven", and "Please Help Me, I'm Falling", all placing in the Country Singles Top 10.

== Reissues ==
- Please Help Me, I'm Falling was reissued on CD in 1999 on the Charly label.

== Track listing ==
=== Side one ===
1. "Please Help Me, I'm Falling" (Don Robertson, Hal Blair)
2. "My Old Home Town" (Hoyt Johnson, Kermit Barrett)
3. "(I'm So Tired of) Goin' Home All by Myself" (Pete Hunter)
4. "It's a Little More Like Heaven" (Hoyt Atkins, Jim Atkins)
5. "Livin' Alone" (Wayne Walker)
6. "Seven Days (The Humming Song)" (Roy Drusky)

=== Side two ===
1. "Send Me the Pillow That You Dream On" (Hank Locklin)
2. "Blues in Advance" (Neil Drummond)
3. "Why Don't You Haul Off and Love Me" (Lonnie Glosson, Wayne Raney)
4. "When the Band Plays the Blues" (John D. Loudermilk)
5. "Hiding in My Heart" (Ken Hodges)
6. "Foreign Car" (Lawton Williams)

== Personnel ==
- Hank Locklin – vocals, guitar
- Grady Martin – guitar
- Chet Atkins – guitar
- Ray Edenton – guitar
- Velma Smith – guitar
- Bob Moore – bass
- Jerry Byrd – bass
- Buddy Harman – drums
- Floyd Cramer – piano
- Marijohn Wilkin – background vocals
- Millie Kirkham – background vocals
- The Jordanaires – background vocals

== Production ==
- Produced by Chet Atkins

== See also ==
- The Nashville A-Team
