= Sugar Moon (Pat Boone song) =

Single by Pat Boone

from the album Pat Boone Sings
- B-side: "Cherie, I Love You"
- Released: April 1958
- Recorded: 1958
- Genre: Pop
- Length: 1:53
- Label: Dot
- Composer(s): Billy Vaughn
- Lyricist(s): D. Wolfe

Pat Boone singles chronology
"A Wonderful Time Up There" / "It's Too Soon to Know" (1958)	"Sugar Moon" (1958)	"Cherie, I Love You" (1958)

"Sugar Moon" is a song written by Danny Wolfe and originally recorded by Pat Boone.

The song reached the top 10 on US Billboard's "Most Played by Jockeys" and "Best Selling Pop Singles in Stores" charts.

== Charts ==
Chart (1958)	Peak position
UK Singles (OCC)	6
