= Sammy Masters =

American singer (1930–2013)

Samuel T. Lawmaster (July 18, 1930 – March 8, 2013), known by his stage name Sammy Masters, was an American rockabilly musician. He is perhaps best known for his 1960 hit, "Rockin' Red Wing".

Masters showed skill in music from an early age, debuting at 12 on the radio with Bob Wills. He recorded his first solo single in 1950 before serving in the Korean War, where he often performed for fellow soldiers. He worked at 4-Star Publishing as a songwriter and demo tape recorder from 1954-1957, where Patsy Cline recorded his "Turn the Cards Slowly" for a minor hit. Masters wrote for American Music in the intervening years before signing with Lode Records in 1960. His song "Rockin' Red Wing" first became a regional hit in California, eventually reached No. 64 on the Billboard Hot 100. It gave Masters his only appearance in the UK Singles Chart when it peaked at No. 36 in June 1960. His song "Who Can I Count On?" became the B-side to Willie Nelson's "Crazy". In the wake of Patsy Cline's success with the song, singers such as Bobby Darin and Wayne Newton covered "Who Can I Count On?". That same year Masters founded his own label, Galahad Records. He co-hosted a television program on KCOP in the 1960s and 1970s, and increasingly found work in TV production in the following decades. In 1997, he released Everybody Digs Sammy Masters, with Deke Dickerson and Ray Campi and toured the rockabilly revival scene in Europe and Japan.

== Early life and military career ==
Born Samuel T. Lawmaster in Sasakwa, Oklahoma, United States, Masters showed skill in music from an early age. At age 12, he debuted on the radio station KTUL in Tulsa with Bob Wills. When he was 16, his family moved to California, and Masters began playing in country groups in the Los Angeles area alongside Spade Cooley and Ole Rasmussen.

Lawmaster recorded his first solo single, "Lost Little Nickel in the Big Juke Box" on Cormac Records in 1950, and followed it with "Crazy River". After these were released Masters served in the Korean War in the Army, where he often performed for fellow soldiers.

== Career ==
In 1954, he returned to California and signed with 4-Star Publishing as a songwriter and demo tape recorder. Patsy Cline recorded his "Turn the Cards Slowly" for a minor hit. Interested in furthering his chances at a successful career in rockabilly, Masters recorded "Pink Cadillac" and "Whop-T-Bop" with guitarist Jimmy Bryant and released them on 4-Star in 1956, but neither sold well. Follow-ups "Angel" and "Jodie" were no more successful, even after Masters's touring schedule and television appearances on The Jack Benny Show and Town Hall Party. His contract with 4-Star ended in 1957, and he wrote for American Music for a few years. "Rockin' Red Wing" was issued on Warner Bros. Records in September 1959 before signing with Lode Records in 1960. Lode re-issued "Rockin' Red Wing" in January that year, which became a regional hit in Los Angeles and eventually reached No. 64 on the Billboard Hot 100. It gave Masters his only appearance in the UK Singles Chart when it peaked at No. 36 in June 1960. His next single, "Golden Slippers", was released nationally by Dot Records, but it was not a success, and neither was "Pierre the Poodle", his last release before losing his recording contract.

He became friends with Willie Nelson in 1961, and his song "Who Can I Count On?" became the B-side to Nelson's "Crazy", a multi-platinum smash for Patsy Cline. In the wake of "Crazy"'s success, singers such as Bobby Darin and Wayne Newton covered "Who Can I Count On?". That same year Masters founded his own label, Galahad Records, which was not a vanity label, though Masters did release an album, May the Good Lord Bless You and Keep You, in 1964, as well as a few singles, on the label. He co-hosted a television program on KCOP in the 1960s and 1970s, and increasingly found work in TV production in the following decades.

In 1997, Masters signed with Dionysus Records and released Everybody Digs Sammy Masters, with Deke Dickerson and Ray Campi, hoping to make a comeback on the rockabilly revival scene in Europe and Japan. He toured in both areas at the end of the decade.

== Death ==
Masters died on March 8, 2013, at age 82.

== Discography ==
=== Singles ===
Year	Title	Label
1951	"Lost Little Nickel" / "May I Call You Darlin’?"	Cormac Records
1956	"Pink Cadillac" / "Some Like It Hot"	4 Star Records
1956	"Pink Cadillac" / "What’s Up"	Modern Records *
1956	"Whop-T-Bop" / "Flat Fleet"	4 Star Records
1956	"Whop-T-Bop" / "2 Rock-A-4"	4 Star Records
1957	"Angel" / "My Heart Is A Hobo"	4 Star Records
1957	"Tall Grow The Sycamores" / "The Drifter"	Decca Records
1958	"Jodie" / "If I Could See The World"	4 Star Records
1958	"Whop-T-Bop" / "2 Rock-A4"	Moonglow Records
1958	"Pink Cadillac" / "Some Like It Hot"	Moonglow Records
1959	"Rockin’ Red Wing" / "Lonely Weekend"	Warner Bros. Records
1960	"Rockin’ Red Wing" / "Lonely Weekend"	Lode Records
1960	"Charolette (In The Pink Corvette)" / "Golden Slippers"	Lode Records
1960	"Charolette (In The Pink Corvette)" / "Golden Slippers"	Dot Records
1961	"Never" / "Pierre The Poodle And The Puppy Dogs"	Lode Records
1962	"Stick Around Joe" / "Remind Me Baby"	Galahad Records
1963	"All Alone In San Antone" / "Roses Remind Me Of You"	Galahad Records
1964	"I Fought The Law (And The Law Won)" / "A Big Man Cried"	Kapp Records
1964	"Louisiana Jane" / "Barcelona Baby"	Kapp Records
1965	"You Can Have Her" / "You Can Have Her" (instrumental)	D&D Records

* Version of original "Pink Cadillac" with additional drums

=== EPs ===
Year	Title	Label
1958	EP: "Angel"; "My Heart Is A Hobo"; "Tall Grows The Sycamores"; "The Drifter"	Sammy Masters Label (4 Star Records)
ca. 1958/1959	EP: "Stop The World (And Let Me Off)"; "Pink Cadillac"; "A Wonderful Time Up There"; "Tall Grows The Sycamores"	4 Star Records
