= She Was Only Seventeen (He Was One Year More) =

Single by Marty Robbins
- B-side: "Sittin' in a Tree House"
- Released: July 7, 1958
- Recorded: 1958
- Genre: Country
- Length: 2:35
- Label: Columbia
- Songwriter(s): Marty Robbins

Marty Robbins singles chronology
"Just Married" (1958)	"She Was Only Seventeen (He Was One Year More)" (1958)	"Ain't I the Lucky One" (1958)

"She Was Only Seventeen (He Was One Year More)" is a song written and sung by Marty Robbins. The song was accompanied with Ray Coniff and His Orchestra, and released on the Columbia label.

== Chart performance ==
In August 1958, it peaked at No. 4 on Billboard's country and western best seller chart. It spent 10 weeks on the charts and was ranked No. 41 on Billboard's 1958 year-end country and western chart. On the Hot 100, "She Was Only Seventeen (He Was One Year More)" peaked at No. 27.

== See also ==
- Billboard year-end top 50 country & western singles of 1958
