= I'll Remember Tonight =

Single by Pat Boone

from the album Pat Boone Sings
- A-side: "The Mardi Gras March"
- Released: 1958
- Recorded: 1958
- Length: 2:20
- Label: Dot
- Composer: Sammy Fain
- Lyricist: Paul Francis Webster

Pat Boone singles chronology
"For My Good Fortune" / "Gee, But It's Lonely" (1958)	"I'll Remember Tonight" / "The Mardi Gras March" (1958)	"With the Wind and the Rain in Your Hair" (1959)

"I'll Remember Tonight" is a song by Pat Boone from his musical film Mardi Gras. Released as a single in 1958, it reached number 34 on the Billboard Hot 100.

== Track listing ==
7" single (Dot 45-15840, 1958)
No.	Title	Lyrics	Music	Length
1.	"I'll Remember Tonight"	P. F. Webster	S. Fain	2:20
2.	"The Mardi Gras March"			2:04

== Charts ==
Chart (1958)	Peak position
Belgium (Ultratop 50 Flanders)	15
Belgium (Ultratip Bubbling Under Wallonia)	–
Norway (VG-lista)	9
UK Singles (OCC)	18
US Billboard Hot 100	34
