= Should We Tell Him =

Single by The Everly Brothers
- A-side: "This Little Girl of Mine"
- Released: 1958
- Recorded: 1957
- Genre: Country
- Length: 2:03
- Label: Cadence
- Songwriter(s): Don Everly, Phil Everly

The Everly Brothers singles chronology
"Wake Up Little Susie" / "Maybe Tomorrow" (1957)	"This Little Girl of Mine" / "Should We Tell Him" (1958)	"All I Have to Do Is Dream" / "Claudette" (1958)

"Should We Tell Him" is a song released in 1958 by the Everly Brothers. The song reached No. 10 on the Billboard survey of Most Played C&W by Jockeys. As the B-side of "This Little Girl of Mine", the single reached No. 26 on the Billboard survey of Best Sellers in Stores and No. 4 on the Billboard survey of C&W Best Sellers in Stores.

== Chart performance ==
Chart (1958)	Peak position
US Billboard - Most Played C&W by Jockeys	10
US Billboard - Best Sellers in Stores	26
US Billboard - C&W Best Sellers in Stores	4
