= Deborah Chessler =

American songwriter (1923–2012)

- Born: Shirley Reingold; Baltimore, Maryland, U.S.
- Died: October 10, 2012; Aventura, Florida, U.S.
- Other name: Shirley Reingold
- Occupation: songwriter
- Known for: "It's Too Soon to Know"

Shirley Reingold (February 15, 1923 – October 10, 2012), professionally known as Deborah Chessler, was a songwriter whose song "It's Too Soon to Know" was number one on the American rhythm and blues charts in November 1948 and is considered by some to be the first rock and roll song. Chessler had songwriting credits on recordings every decade since then.

Chessler pitched her songs to well-known musicians by singing them aloud, as she didn't read or write music or play piano. Some of her first sales were to Desi Arnaz and Lionel Hampton. She began to manage the Vibra-naires, a group that would become the Orioles. She got them booked on Arthur Godfrey's Talent Scouts TV show, where they came in third but were a popular success. Their first record, a single called "It's Too Soon to Know," had been previously recorded by Savannah Churchill. The group's version of the song, which came out in June 1948, was considered one of the first rhythm and blues songs, and was said to have "ushered in the doo wop era." Her relationship with the band was notable because she was "a young Jewish woman managing a black vocal group in an age when the entertainment industry...was rigidly segregated."

The group recorded other Chessler songs, including "Tell Me So," "I Need You Baby," and "Forgive and Forget." Chessler left the group in 1954 in order to spend less time on the road. and did not see the group again until the Rock and Roll Hall of Fame induction ceremony in 1995. Her time with the band was turned into a musical, Soul Harmony: The Story of Deborah Chessler, Sonny Til & the Orioles.

== Personal life ==
Chessler grew up in Baltimore, Maryland. She dropped out of high school at the age of 17 to get married; she divorced her first husband in the 1950s. She later married Paul Reingold and moved to Florida. They had one daughter, Wendy.

== See also ==
- Origins of Rock and Roll in the 1940s
