= Curtain in the Window =

Single by Ray Price

from the album The Same Old Me
- B-side: "It's All Your Fault"
- Released: 1958
- Recorded: 1957
- Genre: Country
- Length: 2:29
- Label: Columbia
- Songwriter(s): L. Ross

Ray Price singles chronology
"My Shoes Keep Walking Back to You" (1957)	"Curtain in the Window" (1958)	"City Lights" (1958)

"Curtain in the Window" is a song written by L. Ross, sung by Ray Price, and released on the Columbia label. In March 1958, it peaked at No. 3 on Billboard's country and western jockey chart. It spent 18 weeks on the charts and was also ranked No. 27 on Billboard's 1958 year-end country and western chart.

== See also ==
- Billboard year-end top 50 country & western singles of 1958
