= Love Me Forever (song) =

Single by The Four Esquires
- B-side: "I Ain't Been Right Since You Left"
- Released: 1957
- Genre: Pop, vocal pop
- Length: 2:26
- Label: Paris
- Songwriters: Beverly Guthrie (lyrics), Gary Lynes (music)
- Producer: Sid Bass

The Four Esquires singles chronology
"The Chopstick Rock" (1957)	"Love Me Forever" (1957)	"Always and Forever" (1958)

"Love Me Forever" is a popular song by the Four Esquires. Released in the United States by the independent record label Paris Records (cat. no. 509), it features orchestral backing by Sid Bass with a female session vocalist. The single peaked at number 25 on the Billboard Hot 100 in 1957. It also reached #23 on the UK Singles Chart.

== Track listing ==
A. "Love Me Forever" (Beverly Guthrie, Gary Lynes)- 2:26
B. "I Ain't Been Right Since You Left" (Al Hoffman, Dick Manning) - 2:12

== Other famous recordings ==
- Eydie Gormé’s cover version of the song (ABC-Paramount cat. no. 9873) — arranged and conducted by Don Costa and featuring a trumpet solo by Bernie Glow — reached the no. 24 position on the Billboard pop charts in 1957 and No. 21 in the UK in 1958.
- Outside the United States, a version by Marion Ryan (Pye Nixa cat. no. 15121) reached No. 5 on the UK Singles Chart in 1958—her highest-charting hit. It featured the Beryl Stott Chorus and an orchestra directed by Peter Knight.
