= Kewpie Doll (song) =

1958 popular song

"Kewpie Doll" is a 1958 popular song, written by Sid Tepper and Roy C. Bennett. It is based on the popular Kewpie comics characters by Rose O'Neill, who inspired a merchandising phenomenon of dolls and other toys.

In the United States, the most popular was a recording by Perry Como; in the United Kingdom, Como competed with a cover version recorded by Frankie Vaughan. The release marked the end of Como's regular high chart placings in the US. It was his last Top Ten hit there for 11 years.

== Releases ==
Como recorded the song twice, on March 4, 1958, and March 11, 1958. The second recording was the basis for its single releases:

- In the United States, on RCA Victor, as a 78 rpm single (catalog number 20-7202), a 45 rpm single (catalog number 47-7202), and a stereophonic 45 rpm single (catalog number 61-7202) (flip side: "Dance Only with Me") (peaked at number 6 on the Billboard chart). Ray Charles was an uncredited backing singer on the recording.
- In the United Kingdom in May 1958, on RCA as a 78 rpm single (catalog number 1055) (flip side: "Dance Only with Me") (number 8 on the UK Singles Chart)
- In Germany, on RCA as a 45 rpm single (catalog number 47-9182) (flip side: "It's a Good Day")
- In Canada the song reached number 11 on the CHUM Charts.

The recording by Frankie Vaughan was issued on Philips P.B. 825, and reached number 10 in the UK Singles Chart.
