= Alone with You (Faron Young song) =

Single by Faron Young

from the album Faron Young Sings the Best of Faron Young
- B-side: "Every Time I'm Kissing You"
- Released: May 23, 1958
- Recorded: 1958
- Genre: Country
- Length: 1:55
- Label: Capitol
- Songwriters: Faron Young, Roy Drusky, Lester Vanadore

Faron Young singles chronology
"I Can't Dance" (1958)	"Alone with You" (1958)	"That's the Way I Feel" (1958)

"Alone with You" is a song written by Faron Young, Roy Drusky, and Lester Vanadore, sung by Faron Young, and released on the Capitol label. It peaked at No. 1 on Billboard's "Most Played C&W by Jockeys" chart for July 21, 1958. It spent 29 weeks on the charts and was also ranked No. 10 on Billboard's 1958 year-end country and western chart.

== See also ==
- Billboard year-end top 50 country & western singles of 1958
