= Radio Luxembourg (DRM) =

Former international broadcasting service of Luxembourg

Radio Luxembourg is a commercial radio station on Digital Radio Mondiale (DRM). Established in 2005, it has broadcast in many languages in conjunction with a television service operated from Luxembourg.

== History ==
Radio Luxembourg in English from 1933 to 1939 and from 1946 to 1992 was an important forerunner of modern commercial radio in the United Kingdom. It was an effective way to advertise products by circumventing British broadcasting restrictions that were in place at the time. The English-language station, which broadcast from the Grand Duchy, closed down at the end of 1992.

=== DRM service ===
In 2005, the parent RTL company stated that the AM transmissions would not resume but that a full-time English service (initially a co-operation between CLT-Ufa and Aquilaine Radio) would begin on Digital Radio Mondiale (DRM). During August of that year, the parent operating company of Radio Luxembourg conducted digital test broadcasts to the UK on 7145 kHz using DRM. This culminated in the soft re-launch of Radio Luxembourg in English at 07:00 BST on 12 September 2005.

For a time, Radio Luxembourg was heard at 7295 kHz DRM, but RTL has since discontinued DRM broadcasts on 7295 kHz throwing the future of the DRM station into doubt, although local DRM broadcasts are still on air in the Grand Duchy of Luxembourg.

Radio Luxembourg could also be heard with a live stream with a classic rock playlist. The station's strapline was "The Best In Classic Rock" and "The Legend Is Back".

Presenters between 2005 and 2008 included Dave Christian, Benny Brown, Sally Carter and Enda Caldwell.

Radio Luxembourg was hoping to broadcast in English on one of the two new digital national DAB services in the UK during 2008, if National Grid Wireless Limited won the licence. However, National Grid Wireless failed to win the licence. The station continued as an online service, although the service has not been updated with any new audio programming since 31 December 2007 and subsequently ceased operating.
