= It's a Little More Like Heaven =

Single by Hank Locklin

from the album Please Help Me, I'm Falling
- B-side: "Blue Grass Skirt"
- Released: March 1958
- Recorded: 1957
- Genre: Country
- Length: 2:32
- Label: RCA Victor
- Songwriter(s): Hoyt & Jim Atkins

Hank Locklin singles chronology
"Send Me the Pillow That You Dream On" (1957)	"It's a Little More Like Heaven" (1958)	"The Upper Room" (1958)

"It's a Little More Like Heaven" is a song written by Hoyt & Jim Atkins, sung by Hank Locklin, and released on the RCA Victor label. In April 1958, it peaked at No. 3 on Billboard's country and western jockey chart. It spent 23 weeks on the charts and was also ranked No. 18 on Billboard's 1958 year-end country and western chart.

== Charts ==
=== Weekly charts ===
Chart (1957)	Peak position
Hot Country & Western Sides (Billboard)	3

== See also ==
- Billboard year-end top 50 country & western singles of 1958
