= Sonny Til =

American musician (1928–1981)

Earlington Carl Tilghman, known as Sonny Til (August 18, 1928 – December 9, 1981), was an American singer. He was the lead singer of The Orioles, a vocal group from Baltimore, Maryland, inducted into the Rock and Roll Hall of Fame in 1995.

By 1960 Til was the only original member left. He led the Orioles from its establishment until his death in 1981 of heart failure, complicated by diabetes.

== Discography ==
=== With the Orioles ===
- Today (Dobre Records DR1016, 1978)
- "Old Gold / New Gold" (RCA LSP-4538, 1971)

=== With Band ===
- Back to the Chapel (Dobre Records DR1026, 1978)
