= This Little Girl of Mine =

1955 single by Ray Charles

Single by Ray Charles
- A-side: "A Fool for You"
- Released: June 1955
- Recorded: April 23, 1955
- Length: 2:30
- Label: Atlantic
- Songwriter: Ray Charles

Ray Charles singles chronology
"I Got a Woman" (1954)	"This Little Girl of Mine" (1955)	"Blackjack" (1955)

"This Little Girl of Mine"

Single by The Everly Brothers

from the album The Everly Brothers
- B-side: "Should We Tell Him"
- Released: 1958
- Recorded: 1957
- Genre: Rock and roll
- Length: 2:14
- Label: Cadence
- Songwriter: Ray Charles

The Everly Brothers singles chronology
"Wake Up Little Susie" (1957)	"This Little Girl of Mine" (1958)	"All I Have to Do Is Dream / Claudette" (1958)

"This Little Girl of Mine" is a rhythm and blues single written and released as a single by Ray Charles in 1955 on the Atlantic label.

"This Little Girl of Mine" played off "This Little Light of Mine", much like the previous "I Got a Woman" and the later "Hallelujah I Love Her So" played off other classic gospel hymns. Much like those songs, it replaced sacred lyrics with secular blues lyrics, featuring doo-wop call and response harmonies.

The song was the B-side to Charles' number-one R&B single, "A Fool for You", and was a charted hit on its own, peaking at number nine on the chart.

The tune was re-made to top 40 pop status in 1958 by The Everly Brothers. It should not be confused with the 1981 Gary U.S. Bonds hit "This Little Girl."
