= A Wonderful Time Up There =

Single by Pat Boone

from the album Pat Boone Sings
- B-side: "It's Too Soon to Know"
- Released: January 9, 1958 (U.S.); March 1958 (U.K.)
- Genre: Pop
- Length: 2:04
- Label: Dot (U.S.); London (U.K.)
- Songwriter: Lee Roy Abernathy
- Producer: Randy Wood

Pat Boone singles chronology
"April Love" (1957)	"A Wonderful Time Up There" (1958)	"Sugar Moon" (1958)

The song known as both "Gospel Boogie" and "A Wonderful Time Up There" was written by Lee Roy Abernathy, and first recorded by him in 1947 under the former name. This release, for the label White Church Record, credits the performance with variant spelling to "Leroy Abernathy Homeland Harmony Quartet".

== Pat Boone recording ==
- In 1958, the song was recorded under the title "A Wonderful Time Up There" by Pat Boone featuring Billy Vaughn and His Orchestra and Chorus. It reached #2 in the U.K. and #4 in the U.S., and was featured on the 1959 album, Pat Boone Sings. The recording was produced by Randy Wood. and ranked #24 on Billboard magazine's Top 50 songs of 1958.
- The B-side to Boone's version, "It's Too Soon to Know", reached #4 in the U.S. and #7 in the U.K. in 1958.

== Other versions ==
- The Blackwood Brothers Quartet released a version of the song as a single in 1958, but it did not chart.
- Sammy Masters released a version of the song on his 1958 EP.
- Tom Netherton released a version of the song on his 1975 album My Favorite Hymns.
- Wally Fowler released a version of the song as the B-side to his 1977 single "A New Star in Heaven".
- Johnny Cash released a version of the song entitled "Gospel Boogie (A Wonderful Time Up There)" on his 1979 album A Believer Sings the Truth.
- Alvin Stardust released a version of the song as a single in 1981 which reached #56 in the U.K.
- Little Roy Lewis released a version of the song on his 1981 album Super Pickin'.
