= Marion Ryan =

British singer (1931–1999)

Marion Ryan (born Marian Ryan; 4 February 1931 – 15 January 1999) was a British singer who achieved fame in the 1950s as part of the early years of British Independent Television. An early press report labelled her "the Marilyn Monroe of popular song".

== Early life ==
Born in Middlesbrough, North Riding of Yorkshire, England, she attended Notre Dame Collegiate School for Girls in Leeds, now Notre Dame Catholic Sixth Form College.

== Career ==
Ryan was working in a hosiery shop in Leeds and broke into show business when she approached Ray Ellington, who was performing at the Locarno in Liverpool in July 1953, and asked to sing with his quartet. He agreed, and the audience reaction was so good that he signed her up to work with the quartet. She made her debut with them at the Locarno, Glasgow in September 1953. Her first radio appearance took place on the show Stepping Out at Radio Roadhouse on the Light Programme on 27 October 1953, when the Ellington quartet were the guest band. She continued to tour with Ellington until 1957, and made further radio appearances with them, including on the popular Goon Show.

She began recording for Pye Nixa in 1955 and mainly made cover versions of American hits. Her version of "Love Me Forever" peaked at number five on the UK Singles Chart in 1958. Her first LP, A Lady Loves, was released in 1959. Beginning in June 1956, she was the regular singer in the popular musical quiz Spot the Tune on Granada Television for seven years, with a total of 209 half-hour programmes, which featured several star hosts, including disc jockey Pete Murray, Canadian pop singer Jackie Rae, comedians Ken Platt and Ted Ray, also featuring Peter Knight and his orchestra. The show re-emerged in the 1970s as Name That Tune.

Ryan went solo in 1957 and undertook her first variety tour, then went on tour with Cyril Stapleton and his Show Band. She made six appearances in BBC's Six-Five Special in 1957 and 1958, and she appeared in the Royal Variety Performance in 1959. Ryan appeared on Sunday Night at the London Palladium in 1963, and made a brief appearance as herself in the film It's All Happening, with Tommy Steele, the same year. She had notable guest spots on The Bob Hope Show in 1958 and The Bing Crosby Show in 1961.

== Personal life and death ==
Her first marriage, at the age of 17, was to Lloyd George Frederick Sapherson (known as Fred) (1913–2001) in 1948. They had twin sons, Barry and Paul (born Leeds, West Riding of Yorkshire, 24 October 1948), a successful vocal duo in the 1960s. In 1969, she married the show business agent Harold Davison (1922–2011) and they had a daughter named Caroline. After this, she gradually eased herself into retirement. Ryan died from a heart attack in 1999, at the age of 67, in Boca Raton, Florida, United States.
