= Michael Holliday =

English singer (1924–1963)

Background information
- Born: Norman Alexander Milne; 26 November 1924; Liverpool, England
- Died: 29 October 1963 (aged 38) Croydon, Surrey, England
- Genre: Traditional popular music
- Occupation: Singer
- Years active: 1951–1963
- Label: Columbia (EMI)

Norman Alexander Milne (26 November 1924 – 29 October 1963), known professionally as Michael Holliday, was an English singer, who was popular in the late 1950s and early 1960s.

He had a number of chart hits in the UK, including two number one singles, "The Story of My Life" and "Starry Eyed".

== Early life ==
Michael Holliday was born in Liverpool, and brought up in the Kirkdale district of the city. His career in music began after he won an amateur talent contest, 'New Voices of Merseyside', at the Locarno Ballroom, West Derby Road, Newsham, Liverpool.

According to Elvis Costello, while working as a seaman in the Merchant Navy, he used to smuggle obscure U.S. jazz records into the UK, where Costello's mother, Lilian Ablett, sold them. Finding himself in the U.S. as a seaman, Holliday was persuaded to enter a talent contest at Radio City Music Hall in New York City, and again he won, inspiring him to seek a career in show business. In 1951, he secured two summer seasons' work as a vocalist with Dick Denny's band at Butlin's Holiday Camp, Pwllheli.

== Singing career ==
In March 1953, he joined the Eric Winstone Band, another Butlin's contracted band that toured when the summer season's work was over. They also broadcast occasionally on BBC Radio.

In December 1954, Holliday wrote to the BBC requesting a TV audition. His audition came in April 1955 and he made his first TV appearance on The Centre Show on 22 July 1955. This TV performance was seen by Norrie Paramor, then head of A&R for EMI's Columbia record label, who signed him as a solo artist. He also sang "Four Feather Falls", the theme tune to the puppet-based television programme of the same name produced by Gerry Anderson.

Holliday's style of singing was influenced by Bing Crosby, who was his idol. The style earned him the title of "the British Bing Crosby". A biography entitled The Man Who Would Be Bing, written by Ken Crossland, was published in 2004.

== Illness and death ==
Holliday had an ongoing problem with stage fright and in 1961 he suffered a mental breakdown. He died in October 1963 from a suspected drug overdose, in Croydon, Surrey.

== Discography ==
UK single (release date), highest chart position

- "The Yellow Rose of Texas" / "Stein Song" (September 1955)
- "Sixteen Tons" / "The Rose Tattoo" (January 1956)
- "Nothin' To Do" / "Perfume, Candy and Flowers" (March 1956), UK No. 20
- "The Gal with the Yallow Shoes" / "Hot Diggity (Dog Ziggity Boom)" (June 1956), UK No. 13
- "Ten Thousand Miles" / "The Runaway Train" (September 1956), UK No. 24
- "I Saw Esau" / "Yallow Yallow Gold" (January 1957)
- "My House Is Your House" / "Love Is Strange" (March 1957)
- "Four Walls" / "Wringle Wrangle" (May 1957)
- "All of You" / "It's the Good Things We Remember" (July 1957)
- "Old Cape Cod" / "Love You Darlin'" (September 1957)
- "The Story of My Life" / "Keep Your Heart" (January 1958), UK No. 1
- "In Love" / "Rooney" (February 1958), UK No. 26
- "Stairway of Love" / "May I?" (May 1958), UK No. 3
- "I'll Always Be in Love with You" / "I'll Be Lovin' You Too" (June 1958), UK No. 27
- "She Was Only Seventeen" / "The Gay Vagabond" (September 1958)
- "My Heart Is an Open Book" / "Careless Hands" (November 1958)
- "Palace of Love" / "The Girls from the County Armagh" (February 1959)
- "Moments of Love" / "Dearest" (May 1959)
- "Life Is a Circus" / "For You, For You" (August 1959)
- "Starry Eyed" / "The Steady Game" (November 1959), UK No. 1
- "Skylark" / "Dream Talk" (March 1960), UK No. 39
- "Little Boy Lost" / "The One Finger Symphony" (June 1960), UK No. 50
- "Catch Me a Kiss" / "Stay in Love" (November 1960)
- "The Miracle of Monday Morning" / "(Remember Me) I'm the One Who Loves You" (February 1961)
- "Dream Boy Dream" / "I Wonder Who's Kissing Her Now" (June 1961)
- "Wishin' on a Rainbow / "I Don't Want You to See Me Cry" (April 1962)
- "Have I Told You Lately that I Love You?" / "It Only Takes a Minute" (September 1962)
- "Laugh and the World Laughs With You" / "Iron Fence" (February 1963)
- "Between Hello and Goodbye" / "Just to Be with You Again" (July 1963)
- "Drums / "Can I Forget You" (November 1963)
- "Dear Heart" / "My Year of Love" (March 1964)
- "My Last Date (with You)" / "Always is a Long, Long Time" (June 1964)

== Albums ==
- Hi! (Columbia, 1957)
- Mike! (Columbia, 1959)
- Holliday Mixture (Columbia, 1960)
- Happy Holliday (Columbia, 1961)
- To Bing - from Mike (Columbia, 1962)

== See also ==
- List of artists who reached number one on the UK Singles Chart
