= Valley Records =

- Country of origin: United States

Valley Records

Valley Records was a mid 20th century United States based record label, headquartered in Knoxville, Tennessee. It was started by Jack Comer.

== See also ==
- List of record labels
