= It's Too Soon to Know =

Doo-wop ballad written and composed by Deborah Chessler

"It's Too Soon to Know" is an American doo-wop ballad by Deborah Chessler (1923–2012), performed first by The Orioles. It was number one on the American Rhythm and blues charts in November 1948. It is considered by some to be the first "rock and roll" song, and described by others as "the first rhythm and blues vocal group harmony recording".

"It's Too Soon to Know" should not be confused with "Too Soon to Know", a different composition written by country singer Don Gibson (whose own recording of that song was released in 1958 on Gibson's album, Oh Lonesome Me) and subsequently covered by Roy Orbison, who had a hit single in the UK (and more modest chart success in the US) with the song in 1966.

== Original release ==
Jerry Blaine's Natural Records released "It’s Too Soon to Know" performed by The Orioles on 21 August 1948 on a 78 rpm single. It was the Orioles' first record for Natural, and Sonny Til was lead vocalist. On the flip side (B side) was "Barbara Lee", also by Deborah Chessler (real name Shirley Chessler and subsequently known as Shirley Reingold), who also managed The Orioles from 1948 to 1954. Blaine subsequently released it on his Jubilee Records label after complaints from National Records. By November it was number 1 in the R&B charts and number 13 in the pop charts. This was the first time that a black band on what was then known as a "race record" crossed over onto the pop charts.

== Reception ==
In its 4 September 1948 issue Billboard noted the label and the release with "New label kicks off with a fine quintet effort on a slow race ballad. Lead tenor shows fine lyric quality" as well as noting it as a "race record".

" 'It's Too Soon to Know' was like Elvis Presley's 'That's All Right (Mama)', Aretha Franklin's 'I Never Loved a Man (The Way I Love You)', Nirvana's 'Smells like Teen Spirit'–a shock, a dead-in-your-tracks what is that?–a sound that was stylistically confusing and emotionally undeniable."

C. B. Morrow described it as "a strong foundation with a bass vocalist and set soothing alto breaths across the middle while a falsetto tenor cut a high line across the top."

== Other recording history ==
- Ella Fitzgerald released a single of "It's Too Soon to Know" in November 1948. Billboard magazine felt that Fitzgerald must have recorded the song just before the musician's strike of 1948 or she wouldn't have been recorded "with a heavy cold". Billboard lamented the "very tired unnamed male quartet harassing her every move" on the song.
- Pat Boone's recording of the song made No.4 on the U.S. Billboard Hot 100 and No.7 on the UK Singles Chart in 1958. It was the B-side to his hit "A Wonderful Time Up There".
- Etta James recorded a version in 1961, that was released as the B-side to her minor U.S. chart hit "Seven Day Fool".
- Irma Thomas also recorded a version in 1961, that was released as a single (which failed to chart) in the U.S. (Minit 633).
- Linda Ronstadt recorded it on her 1993 Winter Light album, but it did not chart separately from the album.
- Glenn Frey recorded the song for his 2012 album After Hours.
- The Ravens recorded a version the song in September 1948 for National Records
