= The Story of My Life (Marty Robbins song) =

Single by Marty Robbins

from the album Marty's Greatest Hits
- B-side: "Once-a-Week Date"
- Released: November 1957
- Recorded: July 22, 1957
- Genre: Country
- Length: 2:33
- Label: Columbia
- Songwriters: Burt Bacharach, Hal David

Marty Robbins singles chronology
"Please Don't Blame Me" (1957)	"The Story of My Life" (1957)	"Just Married" (1958)

"The Story of My Life" is a song written by Burt Bacharach and Hal David. It was published in 1957. It was recorded by Marty Robbins and reached number one on Billboard's country chart in 1958, and it became a number one hit song for Michael Holliday in the UK.

== Background ==
"The Story of My Life" was the first successful collaboration between Hal David and Burt Bacharach. Although they did not set out to write a country song, their song was recorded by American country music singer Marty Robbins. Robbins was accompanied in the recording by the whistling of the Ray Conniff Singers and a small-scale guitar. The song was released in November 1957 and peaked at number one on two US country charts (C&W Best Sellers in Stores and Most Played C&W by Jockeys), staying for four weeks on Best Sellers in early 1958. It also crossed over to the pop chart, reaching number fifteen. It reached number two on the Australian Singles Chart.

== Charts ==
Chart (1957–1958)	Peak position
Canada (CHUM Hit Parade)	2
US (Billboard Most Played by Jockeys)	15
US (Billboard C&W Best Sellers)	1

== Michael Holliday version ==
In the United Kingdom, Michael Holliday recorded a cover version on 10 December 1957 at the Abbey Road Studio. Holliday was backed by the Mike Sammes Singers, with Sammes singing the deep-voiced "bom-boms". The sound engineer created an echo effect with a second tape head, producing a fuller sound for Holliday's voice. Although Holliday was dissatisfied with the record, it became his first No. 1 in the UK Singles Chart in February 1958. The song was replaced as No. 1 by Perry Como's "Magic Moments", also written by Bacharach and David, the first time any songwriters had consecutive No. 1s on the British chart.

In addition to Michael Holliday's No. 1 single (Columbia 45-DB-4058), three other versions of "The Story of My Life" were released in the UK around the same time in 1958: Gary Miller recorded a version that reached No. 14 in the UK; a version by Alma Cogan reached No. 25; and a single by Dave King reached No. 20.

== Other versions ==
- A pop-rock version by Herman's Hermits was included on the US compilation LP The Best Of Herman's Hermits – Volume II, released in 1966.
- Connie Francis recorded the song in 1968 for possible inclusion in her album Connie Francis Sings Bacharach & David, but it was omitted. The track was later released in 1979 on the album titled Connie Francis – Sings Bacharach, Kaempfert, Last & Mancini.
- Larry Cunningham recorded a version which reached No. 16 on the Irish chart in 1983.
- Irish singer Val Doonican also recorded the song, which became his signature theme. He titled his 2009 autobiography "My Story, My Life", in reference to the song title.
