= Blue Blue Day =

1958 song by Don Gibson

Song
- Songwriter: Don Gibson

"Blue Blue Day" is a 1958 single written and originally performed by Don Gibson. On the recording Gibson is accompanied by the Jordanaires.

== Chart performance ==
"Blue Blue Day" went to number one for two weeks on the Country & Western Best Seller chart and remained on that chart for a total of six months. The song also was Don Gibson's second of four Top 40 entries, where it peaked at number twenty.

== Other versions ==
- Wilburn Brothers - version peaked at number 14 on the Billboard charts in 1961.
- Anne Murray - included in her album Country Croonin' (2002)
- Connie Francis and Hank Williams Jr. - on the album Connie Francis and Hank Williams Jr. Sing Great Country Favorites (1964)
- Dean Martin - for his album Dean "Tex" Martin: Country Style (1963)
- James Intveld - for his album James Intveld (1995)
- The Kendalls - version peaked at number 69 on the Billboard Hot Country Singles chart in 1989.
- Val Doonican (1963).
- The Spotnicks recorded a version which reached No. 1 in Norway in 1963.
- Tracy Nelson - for her album Mother Earth Presents with some members of her band Mother Earth (1969)
