= Claudette (song) =

Single by the Everly Brothers
- B-side: "All I Have to Do is Dream"
- Published: March 7, 1958
- Released: April 1958
- Recorded: March 6, 1958
- Studio: RCA Studios, Nashville
- Genre: Rock and roll, rockabilly
- Length: 2:12
- Label: Cadence
- Songwriter: Roy Orbison
- Producer: Archie Bleyer

The Everly Brothers singles chronology
| "This Little Girl of Mine" (1958) | "Claudette" (1958) | "Bird Dog" (1958) |

"Claudette" is a 1958 song which reached number 1 in the UK Singles Chart that year in a recording by the Everly Brothers. It was the first notable success as a songwriter for Roy Orbison, who named it after his first wife. Orbison also recorded his own version of the song. Although originally released as the B-side to the Everly Brothers' number 1 hit "All I Have to Do is Dream", their recording of "Claudette" reached number 30 in its own right, and the two songs were jointly listed at number 1 in the UK.

== Background ==
The song "Claudette" was written by Roy Orbison in the early days of his career, prior to his achieving fame as a singer. Written about his wife of the same name, whom he had married the previous year, the song was recorded by Orbison but unreleased. He cut a demo version at the Sun Studio in Memphis on January 10, 1958, accompanying himself on guitar, in addition to another unreleased version with drums.

Orbison would later record two versions of the song for commercial release: firstly, in a version included on his 1965 MGM album There is Only One Roy Orbison, and then in 1986 for In Dreams: The Greatest Hits, an album composed mostly of re-recordings of his hit songs. "Claudette" was also included as part of his set for Roy Orbison and Friends: A Black and White Night, a Cinemax television special filmed on September 30, 1987, at the Cocoanut Grove in Los Angeles and first broadcast on January 3, 1988. The song was not included in the broadcast due to time constraints, but was on a 1999 re-issue of A Black & White Night Live, an album version of the show.

According to Phil Everly, when the brothers were in Chicago, they asked Orbison if he had a song for them, and he gave them "Claudette". It was recorded by the Everly Brothers on March 6, 1958, at RCA Studios in Nashville, with the backing conducted by Archie Bleyer. The song was originally published by Orbison himself on March 7, 1958, and then by Acuff Rose Music on April 29 that year. Orbison used the royalties from the song to buy himself out of his contract with Sun Records.

The Everly Brothers' manager, Wesley Rose, signed Orbison to Acuff Rose, and became his manager. The song was later performed by the Everly Brothers at their September 23, 1983 concert at the Royal Albert Hall in London, a recording of which was issued on The Everly Brothers Reunion Concert album.

== Release and chart performance ==
Cadence Records released the Everly Brothers' version of "Claudette" as the B-side to "All I Have to Do is Dream", a song which reached number 1 on the US Billboard chart. "Claudette" reached number 30 in its own right, however, in May 1958, and the two songs were jointly listed at number 1 in the UK's New Musical Express chart, a position the record held for seven weeks, starting in July that year. The Record Mirror also listed both titles at number 1 together, although Melody Maker listed "All I Have to Do is Dream" on its own; Disc magazine did not list "Claudette" at number 1 in its Top Twenty, but did show both sides together at number 1 in the Juke Box Top Ten.

"Claudette" was one of the few UK number 1 singles chart hits from the 1950s not to appear on the sheet music charts, which were broadcast at the time on Radio Luxembourg (the others being the "Let's Have Another Party" medley, "Rose Marie", and "Gamblin' Man").

== Cover versions ==
In 1997, "Claudette" was released as the lead single from Dwight Yoakam's Under the Covers album, and it made the Hot Country Singles & Tracks chart. Other cover versions include:

- Kris Jensen had a single release on the Hickory label in 1962
- John Denver on his 1985 album Dreamland Express
- Status Quo on their 2000 album Famous in the Last Century
- The Four Pennies on their 1964 album 2 Sides of the 4 Pennies
- The Nighthawks on their 1981 album Times Four
- Cliff Richard, released on The World Tour 2004 DVD
- Robert Johnson on his 1979 album Close Personal Friend
- Showaddywaddy on their 2008 release The Sun Album
- The Flames
