= Just Married (song) =

1958 single by Marty Robbins

"Just Married" is a 1958 single by Marty Robbins. The song was written by Barry De Vorzon and Al Allen.

The single peaked at number three on the C&W Best Seller charts. "Just Married" also became Marty Robbins' fourth entry on the pop chart, peaking at number twenty-six. "Just Married" reached number one position on the Billboard's Top Country Singles charts on 5–26–58. (Joel Whitburn's Top Country Singles 1944–1988)
