= Twixt =

'Twixt, a contraction of betwixt, an archaic term for between, could refer to:

- TwixT, a 1960s board game
- Twixt animation system, a 1984 3D computer animation system
- Twixt (film), a 2011 horror thriller film
- Twixt Love and Fire, a 1914 short comedy film featuring Fatty Arbuckle
- Twixt Stakes, an American thoroughbred horse race
- "'Twixt Twelve and Twenty", a song by Pat Boone, 1959
- 'Twixt Twelve and Twenty (book), a book by Pat Boone which offered advice to teenagers

== Other uses ==
- There's many a slip 'twixt the cup and the lip, a proverb

== See also ==
- Twixteen
- Twixter
- Twixters (TV series)
