= The Star Spangled Banner (album) =

Studio album by Pat Boone
- Released: 1963
- Genres: Pop; patriotic
- Label: Dot
- Producer: Randy Wood

Pat Boone chronology
Pat Boone Sings Days of Wine and Roses (1963)	The Star Spangled Banner (1963)	Tie Me Kangaroo Down Sport (1963)

Professional ratings
Review scores
Source	Rating
AllMusic	2/5 stars
Billboard	positive ("Spotlight" pick)

The Star Spangled Banner is the twentieth studio album by Pat Boone, released in 1963 on Dot Records.

Billboard picked the album for its "Spotlight" section. "Leading off with the National Anthem, the program includes a group of memorable patriotic songs and songs of the various Armed Forces — 'Marines Hymn,' 'Anchors Aweigh,' 'The U.S. Air Force,' among them," informs the magazine. "Although this current approach is a far cry from [Pat Boone's] "Tutti Frutti" days, it's the kind of thing which could suddenly catch on," opines the reviewer.

== Track listing ==
Side one
No.	Title	Writer(s)	Length
1.	"The Star Spangled Banner"	Francis Scott Key / John Stafford Smith	1:42
2.	"The United States Air Force"	Robert Crawford	2:03
3.	"America the Beautiful"	Katharine Lee Bates / Samuel A. Ward	2:27
4.	"Battle Hymn of the Republic"	Julia Ward Howe / William Steffe	2:45
5.	"Anchors Aweigh"	Alfred Hart Miles; Zimmerman; George D. Lottman	2:39
6.	"God Bless America"	Irving Berlin	2:04

Side two
No.	Title	Writer(s)	Length
1.	"This Is My Country"	Raye; Jacobs	2:36
2.	"The Marines Hymn"	Jacques Offenbach	2:20
3.	"America"	Samuel Francis Smith	2:10
4.	"I'm Proud to Be an American"	Albert Hay Malotte	2:14
5.	"There's a Star Spangled Banner Waving Somewhere"	Paul Roberts; Darnell	1:43
6.	"The Caissons Go Rolling Along"	Edmund L. Gruber	1:52
