= Star-Spangled Banner (disambiguation) =

"The Star-Spangled Banner" is the national anthem of the United States.

Star-Spangled Banner or The Star-Spangled Banner may also refer to:

- Flag of the United States, the national flag of the United States in general
  - Star-Spangled Banner (flag), the actual flag that flew over Fort McHenry on September 14, 1814, that inspired the national anthem of the United States
- The Star Spangled Banner (album), an album by Pat Boone, 1963
- "The Star Spangled Banner" (Whitney Houston recording), 1991
