= Moody River (album) =

Studio album by Pat Boone
- Released: 1961
- Genre: Pop
- Label: Dot

Pat Boone chronology
Great! Great! Great! (1960)	Moody River (1961)	My God and I (1961)

Professional ratings
Review scores
Source	Rating
AllMusic	2/5 stars
Billboard	positive ("Spotlight" pick)

Moody River is the fourteenth studio album by Pat Boone, released in 1961 on Dot Records.

== Chart performance ==
The album peaked at No. 29 on the Billboard 150 Best Selling Monoraul LP's, during a thirty-week run on the chart.

== Track listing ==
Side one
No.	Title	Writer(s)	Length
1.	"Moody River"	Gary Daniel Bruce	2:38
2.	"Angel on My Shoulder"	Shelby Flint	2:33
3.	"The Great Pretender"	Buck Ram	2:30
4.	"Love Makes the World Go 'Round"	Bob Merrill	2:17
5.	"Corinna, Corinna"	J. Mayo Williams, Bo Carter, Mitchell Parish	2:04
6.	"A Thousand Years"	Rod West	2:46

Side two
No.	Title	Writer(s)	Length
1.	"Sleep"	Earl Lebieg	2:15
2.	"Will You Love Me Tomorrow"	Carole King, Gerry Goffin	2:40
3.	"There's a Moon Out Tonight"	Al Striano, Joe Luccisano, Alberico Gentile	2:12
4.	"Georgia on My Mind"	Hoagy Carmichael, Stuart Gorrell	2:53
5.	"Blue Moon"	Richard Rodgers, Lorenz Hart	2:31
6.	"I've Told Ev'ry Little Star"	Oscar Hammerstein II, Jerome Kern	2:27

== Charts ==
Chart (1961)	Peak position
US Billboard Best Selling Monoraul LP's	29
