= Angel on My Shoulder (Shelby Flint song) =

Single by Shelby Flint

from the album Shelby Flint
- B-side: "Somebody"
- Released: October 1960
- Genre: Pop
- Length: 2:17
- Label: Valiant 6001
- Songwriter: Shelby Flint
- Producer: Perry Botkin, Jr.

Shelby Flint singles chronology
"I Will Love You" (1958)	"Angel on My Shoulder" (1960)	"I Will Love You" (1961)

"Angel on My Shoulder" is a song written and recorded by Shelby Flint that was released on a Valiant Records 45 rpm single in 1960 and on her self-titled debut album in 1961. The single reached No. 22 on the US Billboard Hot 100 hit parade of discs of 45 rpm in early 1961. It was Flint's only Top 40 hit.

== Other versions ==
- Jerry Wallace (1960)
- Kathy Young (1961)
- Jimmy Young (1961)
- Pat Boone released his cover on the album Moody River (1961)
- The Cascades released a version of the song on their 1963 album, Rhythm of the Rain
- Gary Martin with The Blockbusters (1964)
- Merrilee Rush charted with her rendition in 1970, reaching #122 (US)
- Joni Lee, daughter of Conway Twitty, hit #42 on the Billboard Country Singles chart, 1976
- Maureen McGovern (1992)
