= White Christmas (Pat Boone album) =

Studio album by Pat Boone
- Released: 1959
- Genre: Pop, Christmas
- Label: Dot

Pat Boone chronology
He Leadeth Me (1959)	White Christmas (1959)	Moonglow (1960)

Professional ratings
Review scores
Source	Rating
AllMusic	4.5/5 stars
Billboard	"Spotlight" pick

White Christmas is the tenth studio album and first Christmas album by Pat Boone. it was released in 1959 on Dot Records.

== Track listing ==
Side one
No.	Title	Writer(s)	Length
1.	"White Christmas"	Irving Berlin
2.	"Jingle Bells"
3.	"Adeste Fideles"
4.	"God Rest Ye Merry, Gentlemen"
5.	"O Little Town of Bethlehem"
6.	"Silver Bells"	Livingston; Evans

Side two
No.	Title	Writer(s)	Length
1.	"Silent Night"
2.	"Oh Holy Night"
3.	"Hark! The Herald Angels Sing"
4.	"The First Noel"
5.	"I'll Be Home for Christmas"	Ram; Gannon; Kent
6.	"Joy to the World"
7.	"It Came Upon a Midnight Clear"
8.	"Here Comes Santa Claus" (with the Foley Sisters)	Autry; Haldeman

== Charts ==
Date	Peak chart position
Date	US Billboard
1962 (January)	39
1962 (December)	116
