= Moonglow (Pat Boone album) =

Studio album by Pat Boone
- Released: 1960
- Genre: Pop
- Label: Dot

Pat Boone chronology
White Christmas (1959)	Moonglow (1960)	This and That (1960)

Professional ratings
Review scores
Source	Rating
AllMusic	2/5 stars
Billboard	positive ("Spotlight" pick)

Moonglow is the eleventh studio album by Pat Boone, released in 1960 on Dot Records.

== Chart performance ==
The album peaked at No. 26 on the Billboard Best Selling Monophonic LP's, during a three-week run on the chart.

== Reception ==
Billboard noted that Boone likely has another successful album and wrote, "...He offers several attractive evergreens including the album title tune, “Who's Sorry Now” and “You Always Hurt the One You Love."

Arthur Rowe on AllMusic wrote "...Moonglow stands among the four or five top albums in Boone's voluminous catalog. And like the others in that group, there is nary a weak link. Each one of the 12 songs is a splendid musical offering."

== Track listing ==
Side one
No.	Title	Writer(s)	Length
1.	"Moonglow"		2:53
2.	"San Antonio Rose"		1:59
3.	"Hands Across the Table"	Jean Delettre, Mitchell Parish	2:19
4.	"You Always Hurt the One You Love"		2:42
5.	"The Very Thought of You"	Ray Noble	2:57
6.	"Girl of My Dreams"	Sunny Clapp	2:23

Side two
No.	Title	Writer(s)	Length
1.	"Again"	Dorcas Cochran, Lionel Newman	2:19
2.	"Who's Sorry Now"	Bert Kalmar, Harry Ruby, Ted Snyder	1:32
3.	"We Love but Once"	Narciso Serradell Sevilla	2:15
4.	"It's a Sin to Tell a Lie"		1:57
5.	"Imagination"	Johnny Burke, Jimmy Van Heusen	2:40
6.	"Unchained Melody"		2:46

== Charts ==
Chart (1960)	Peak position
US Billboard Best Selling Monophonic LP's	26
