= Tie Me Kangaroo Down Sport (album) =

Studio album by Pat Boone
- Released: 1963
- Genre: Pop
- Label: Dot

Pat Boone chronology
The Star Spangled Banner (1963)	Tie Me Kangaroo Down Sport (1963)	Sing Along Without Pat Boone! (1964)

Professional ratings
Review scores
Source	Rating
AllMusic	2/5 stars
Billboard	positive ("Spotlight" pick)

Tie Me Kangaroo Down Sport is the 21st studio album by Pat Boone, released in 1963 on Dot Records.

== Track listing ==
Side one
No.	Title	Writer(s)	Length
1.	"Tie Me Kangaroo Down, Sport"	R. Harris	2:38
2.	"I Feel Like Crying"	Red West	2:28
3.	"Deep Are the Roots"	Bob Perper, John Howard	2:24
4.	"More Than Only Friends"		2:08
5.	"Two Little Kisses"	Rudy Toombs	2:58
6.	"I Need Someone"	Ted Jarrett	2:15

Side two
No.	Title	Writer(s)	Length
1.	"A Whole Lotta Water"	John D. Smith, Bonnie Smith	1:48
2.	"My Queen In Calico"	Paul Anka	2:26
3.	"Angel Talk"	Joe Simmons, Johnny Brandon, Stuart Wiener	2:12
4.	"Going To New York"	Mary Lee Reed	2:37
5.	"Just Out Of Reach"	Virgil F. Stewart	2:35
6.	"Memory Mountain"	Warner McPherson	2:05
