= Pat Boone Sings Guess Who? =

Studio album by Pat Boone
- Released: 1963
- Genre: Pop
- Label: Dot

Pat Boone chronology
I Love You Truly (with Shirley Boone) (1962)	Pat Boone Sings Guess Who? (1963)	Pat Boone Sings Days of Wine and Roses (1963)

Professional ratings
Review scores
Source	Rating
AllMusic	2/5 stars

Pat Boone Sings Guess Who? is the seventeenth studio album by Pat Boone, released in 1963 on Dot Records.

On this album, Boone covers Elvis Presley.

== Track listing ==
Side one
No.	Title	Length
1.	"Love Me"	3:22
2.	"Teddy Bear"	2:11
3.	"Hound Dog"	2:14
4.	"All Shook Up"	2:12
5.	"One Night"	3:09
6.	"Wear My Ring Around Your Neck"	2:15

Side two
No.	Title	Length
1.	"Love Me Tender"	2:48
2.	"Don't Be Cruel"	2:06
3.	"Blue Suede Shoes"	2:19
4.	"My Baby Left Me"	2:26
5.	"Heartbreak Hotel"	3:30
6.	"It's Now or Never"	2:45
