= This and That (album) =

Studio album by Pat Boone
- Released: 1960
- Genre: Pop
- Label: Dot

Pat Boone chronology
Moonglow (1960)	This and That (1960)	Great! Great! Great! (1960)

Professional ratings
Review scores
Source	Rating
AllMusic	4/5 stars
Billboard	4/4 stars

This and That is the twelfth studio album by Pat Boone, released in 1960 on Dot Records.

== Track listing ==
Side one
No.	Title	Writer(s)	Length
1.	"Wait for Me Mary"	Charles Tobias, Nat Simon, Harry Tobias	2:10
2.	"Many Dreams Ago"	Joe Sauter, Cirino Colacrai	2:12
3.	"Didn't It Rain"	Traditional	2:04
4.	"Oh, What a Feeling"	Bob Millsap, Danny Wolfe	2:18
5.	"(Remember Me) I'm the One Who Loves You"	Stuart Hamblen	2:20
6.	"Blue Bobby Socks"	Anthony Falco, Ralph Falco	2:16

Side two
No.	Title	Writer(s)	Length
1.	"Bewildered"	Leonard Whitcup, Teddy Powell	2:50
2.	"It's Been a Long, Long Time"	Sammy Cahn, Jule Styne	2:14
3.	"Call It Stormy Monday"	Aaron T. Walker	2:17
4.	"Heart Full of Happiness"	Robert Allen, Al Stillman	2:29
5.	"Spo-Dee-O-Dee"	Pat Boone	2:22
6.	"Jimmie Brown the Newsboy"	A. P. Carter	2:00
