= Meyer Levin (military) =

American aviator (1916-1943)

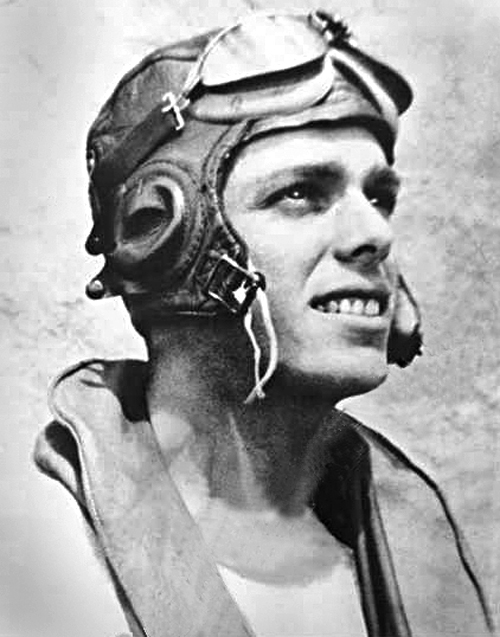
- Born: June 5, 1916; Brooklyn, New York
- Died: January 7, 1943 (aged 26); New Britain, Papua New Guinea
- Alma mater: Brooklyn Technical High School
- Military career
- Allegiance: United States
- Branch: United States Army Air Corps
- Service years: 1939 - 1943
- Rank: Master Sergeant, bombardier
- Nickname: Mike
- Unit: 19th Bombardment Group
- Conflicts: World War II, against Japan; Coral Sea
- Awards: Distinguished Flying Cross; Purple Heart; Oak Leaf Cluster (6); Silver Star medal American Defense Service Medal(1); American Campaign Medal; Asiatic-Pacific Campaign Medal (6); Philippine Defense Medal; World War II Victory Medal; Good Conduct Medal

Meyer (Mike) Levin (June 5, 1916 - January 7, 1943) was a World War II B-17 Flying Fortress bombardier, pilot, and war hero. Three days after the surprise attack on Pearl Harbor, he flew on a mission with pilot Colin Kelly against the Japanese navy. Kelly died trying to save his crew and became a war hero. On that mission, Levin was credited as being the first American to sink a Japanese warship. During his subsequent 60 combat missions, Levin also sank an enemy ship during the Battle of the Coral Sea.

A year later, although he was off duty, he volunteered to be the spotter and bombardier for a combat mission near New Guinea. During its return, the B-17 ran low on fuel and made a forced landing into stormy seas. Levin remained in the plane and released the life raft which saved the lives of the three other crew members. In doing so, however, Levin was injured and died when the plane sank.

Levin received the distinguished flying cross for bombing the IJN Natori, the silver star for a direct hit on a 15,000 ton Japanese transport, and the oak leaf cluster for gallantry. He is remembered as one of the first American heroes of World War II for sacrificing his own life to save members of his crew.

== Early life ==
Levin was born June 5, 1916, in Rochester, New York to Jewish parents, Samuel Levin and Leah Levin. The family moved to Brooklyn when Meyer was 14 years old. His father was a tailor and clothing inspector for the Navy; they lived at 1504 East Thirty-third Street in Brooklyn.

After Levin graduated from Brooklyn Technical High School, he enrolled in a government aeronautical school, where he graduated second highest in his class. He spent the next three years trying to find work in the aircraft industry, but was continually denied a job due to his Jewish heritage. He then decided to enlist in the military.

== Army Air Corps ==
Levin enlisted in the Army Air Corps in 1939 where he began work with a ground crew in the Philippines. After Pearl Harbor was attacked by the Japanese on December 7, 1941, he became a bombardier with the 19th Operations Group. One of his first missions was on a B-17 Flying Fortress on December 10, piloted by Captain Colin Kelly, which intercepted a Japanese invasion convoy off Luzon. In a later interview, Levin recalled: "In the Jap convoy was a battleship protecting landing operations and we made this our target. It was what you might call a bombardier's dream...Fifteen seconds before I released the bombs I knew I was going to hit the ship." After taking control from Kelly for the bomb run, Levin reported that he saw the battleship set ablaze by three direct hits. On the return flight, the B-17 was hit by Japanese Zeros and caught fire. As the plane lost power and began to lose altitude, Kelly told his crew, including Levin, to bail out while he tried to keep the plane straight and level. Kelly died when the plane crashed near Clark Field.

News reports in the aftermath named Levin's target as the battleship Haruna, with Kelly and Levin being hailed as heroes for sinking it. In fact, Haruna was in the Gulf of Siam on December 10, supporting the invasion of Malaya. Levin's actual target was the light cruiser Natori, which took damage from near misses, but survived.

For his actions against Natori, Levin was hailed as the first American to blow up and sink a Japanese warship. Newspaper headlines covered the story about Kelly's death, and of Levin as his bombardier. 2,500 residents of Brooklyn presented a plaque to Levin's parents to honor their son's war efforts.

When the Philippines fell under Japanese domination, Levin, along with fellow crew member Haskell Wexler, a future cinematographer, were then stationed in Australia, at General Macarthur's headquarters. From there, Levin took part in over 60 missions over the following year, including the Battle of the Coral Sea, where he sank a 15,000-ton Japanese transport. On a furlough soon after, while visiting his East Flatbush home, over 2,000 neighbors gave Levin a hero's welcome and designated the occasion "Meyer Levin Day."

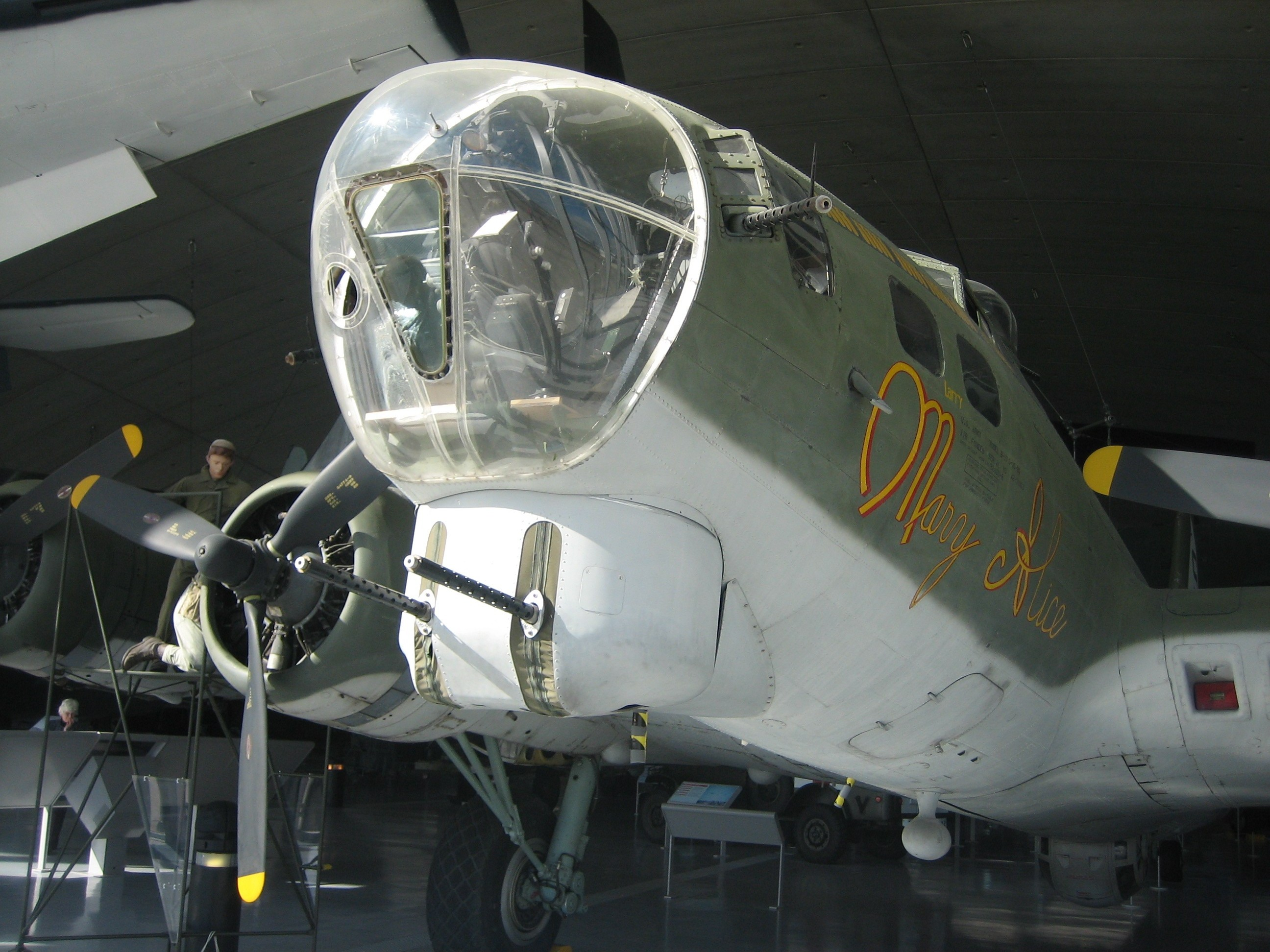
B-17 nose turret and bombardier's station

He made his last flight on January 7, 1943. Although he was then off duty, he volunteered to accompany the crew since he was a skilled spotter. Co-pilot Lt. John Barbee says that Levin was a "clever observer and an expert at identifying enemy ships." He could also hit his targets "better than the officers," according to an officer who flew with him. "He never left the bombsight even when the Japs were shooting at him."

But on its return home the plane ran low on fuel and hit a major storm, which forced the plane to fly just above wave height. "The situation was hopeless," recalls Barbee, "and suddenly all the motors stalled. The Fortress plunged into the sea ..." Barbee remembers last seeing Levin grasping for the safety hatches which released the raft. But while releasing the raft, Levin was injured and never got out. The other three crew members, including Barbee, survived. Barbee says "I can't remember how I got out of the ship. I remember scrambling aboard the life raft and marveling that it was already afloat." They spent thirteen hours on the raft before they were rescued. The story ran in the New York Times:

Master Sergeant Meyer Levin, the Brooklyn boy who blasted the Japaneses battleship as bombardier for Captain Colin Kelly, went down with a Flying Fortress, out of fuel, that plunged into a stormy sea. The last his mates saw of him he was loosening the safety catches of a life raft. Their story leaves no doubt that he gave his own life to save theirs...His last words to the crew were, "I hope you make it."

Army Chief of Staff George Marshall sent Levin's parents a personal note of condolence. Later, writer and broadcaster Lowell Thomas credited Levin for being a "star of the historic 19th Operations Group, with its continuous pursuit of Japanese warships. A few months after Levin's death, over 1,000 people attended a memorial service for him in Brooklyn.

To honor Levin, the United Jewish War Effort, in February 1943, through its chairman rabbi Stephen Samuel Wise, sent the Soviet Red Army 100 medical field units bearing Levin's name. It then began another campaign to produce Memorial Medical Field Units for the U.S. Army. In March 1943, the Jewish War Veterans organization raised $75,000 toward a goal of $350,000, to replace the plane in which Levin lost his life. An additional honor was given to Levin, when a new NYC junior high school was named after him, in Brooklyn NY, not far from where he lived- Meyer Levin JHS
