= Songmaker =

Studio album by Pat Boone
- Released: 1981
- Genre: Pop
- Label: Dot

Pat Boone chronology
Just The Way I Am (1979)	Songmaker (1981)	A Pocketful of Hope (1982)

Professional ratings
Review scores
Source	Rating
AllMusic	2/5 stars

Songmaker is the 57th studio album and a Christian music album by Pat Boone, released in 1981 on his Lamb & Lion Records label.

== Track listing ==
Side one
No.	Title	Length
1.	"Lifetime Love"	2:55
2.	"Songmaker"	3:46
3.	"Second Coming"	3:09
4.	"Paradise"	3:10
5.	"Take Some Time"	2:57

Side two
No.	Title	Length
1.	"Builder"	2:45
2.	"You"	3:25
3.	"Walk on Water"	2:39
4.	"In America"	3:50
5.	"You Prove Your Love Again"	3:13
