= Salute to the Teenagers =

Salute to the Teenagers is a 1960 TV musical variety special hosted by Pat Boone. It was produced by his Cooga Mooga company and aired on June 27, 1960. Guest stars included Bobby Darin, Paul Anka, Anita Bryant and Annette. It was also known as Coke Time.
