= Great! Great! Great! =

Studio album by Pat Boone
- Released: 1960
- Genre: Pop
- Label: Dot

Pat Boone chronology
| This and That (1960) | Great! Great! Great! (1960) | Moody River (1961) |

Professional ratings
Review scores
| Source | Rating |
|---|---|
| AllMusic | 3/5 stars |
| Billboard | positive ("Spotlight" pick) |

Great! Great! Great! (or Great Great Great) is the thirteenth studio album by Pat Boone, released in late 1960 on Dot Records.

== Track listing ==
Side one
| No. | Title | Writer(s) | Length |
|---|---|---|---|
| 1. | "Stagger Lee" | | 2:23 |
| 2. | "El Paso" | Marty Robbins | 4:45 |
| 3. | "Running Bear" | | 2:37 |
| 4. | "Send Me the Pillow You Dream On" | Hank Locklin | 2:50 |
| 5. | "Cathy's Clown" | D. Everly, P. Everly | 2:20 |
| 6. | "The Wayward Wind" | | 2:47 |

Side two
| No. | Title | Writer(s) | Length |
|---|---|---|---|
| 1. | "Tweedlee Dee" | Winfield Scott | 2:33 |
| 2. | "Cherry Pink and Apple Blossom White" | | 2:20 |
| 3. | "That'll Be the Day" | | 2:12 |
| 4. | "White Silver Sands" | Matthews, Hart | 2:35 |
| 5. | "Why Don't You Haul Off and Love Me" | | 2:01 |
| 6. | "Personality" | Logan, Price | 2:30 |
| 7. | "He's Got the Whole World in His Hands" | | 2:15 |
