= Colin Kelly =

United States Army Air Corps officer and pilot (1915–1941)

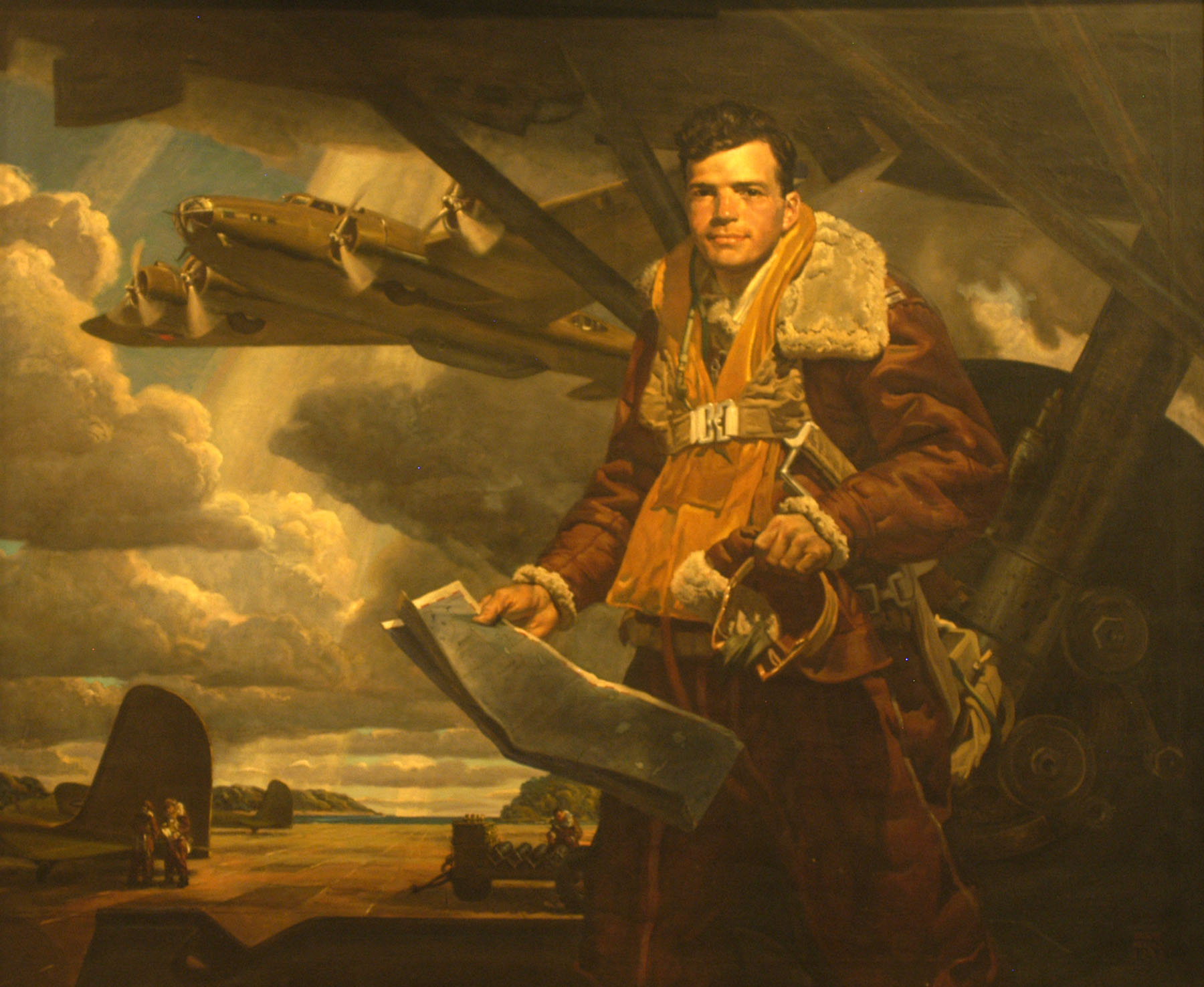
- Kelly, painted in 1942
- Born: Colin Purdie Kelly Jr. July 11, 1915; Monticello, Florida, U.S.
- Died: December 10, 1941 (aged 26); Clark Field, Pampanga, Philippines
- Burial place: Oak Ridge Cemetery, Madison, Florida
- Education: West Point Class of 1937
- Military career
- Allegiance: United States
- Branch: United States Army Air Corps
- Service years: 1937–1941
- Rank: Captain
- Units: 14th Bombardment Squadron, 19th Bombardment Group
- Conflicts: World War II
- Awards: Distinguished Service Cross; Distinguished Flying Cross; Purple Heart

Colin Purdie Kelly Jr. (/ˈkoʊlɪn/ KOH-lin; July 11, 1915 – December 10, 1941) was an American B-17 Flying Fortress pilot who flew bombing missions against the Japanese navy in the days following the attack on Pearl Harbor. He is remembered as one of the first American heroes of World War II after ordering his crew to bail out while he remained at the bomber's controls trying to keep the plane in the air before it exploded, killing him. His was the first American B-17 to be shot down in combat.

== Life ==
Kelly was born in Monticello, Florida in 1915 and raised in Madison, Florida, where he graduated from high school in 1932. He went on to West Point in 1933, graduated in the Class of 1937, and was assigned to a B-17 bomber group. He was the first Army officer to fly the Boeing Flying Fortress in the Far East.

== Battle and death ==
At the start of the Pacific War, Kelly was stationed at Clark Field in the Philippines, serving as part of the 14th Bombardment Squadron of the Army Air Force's 19th Bombardment Group. On December 10, 1941 (December 9 in the United States), three B-17C Flying Fortresses, one piloted by Kelly, were ordered to search for a reported Japanese aircraft carrier operating as part of the Philippine invasion force. Due to an impending Japanese air rad, Kelly's B-17 (No. 40-2045) carried only three 600-pound (270 kg) demolition bombs in its bomb bay, there being no time to properly arm or fuel the aircraft. In addition, heavy aircraft losses over the previous two days meant that there were no fighters available to escort the B-17s to their targets.

While searching for the reported carrier, Kelly and his crew sighted a Japanese invasion force north of Aparri. Among the ships was one they identified as a Fusō-class battleship, but was actually the light cruiser IJN Natori. After failing to locate their assigned target (no carriers had been assigned to the Philippines operation), Kelly decided to attack the invasion force, with the supposed battleship as his primary target.

Kelly made three passes over his target at 20,000 feet (6,100 m); his bombardier, MSgt Meyer Levin, was unable to set up a precise drop on the first two. On the third run, Levin released the three bombs in trail, bracketing Natori and its escorting destroyer, IJN Harukaze. In his narrative report on the flight, Colonel Eugene L. Eubank stated the following:

The first bomb struck about 50 yards short, the next alongside, and the third squarely amidship... A great cloud of smoke arose from the point of impact. The forward length of the ship was about 10 degrees off center to portside. The battleship [i.e. Natori] began weaving from side to side and headed toward shore. Large trails of oil followed in its wake...

While none of the bombs actually hit, both Natori and Harukaze took damage from near-misses.

On its return flight, Kelly's bomber was engaged by A6M Zeros from the Tainan Air Group, which had been patrolling over Vigan. Their first pass killed TSgt William J. Delehanty, while the second started a fire in the B-17's left wing that quickly spread to the fuselage. Kelly ordered his crew to bail out while he and his co-pilot, 2nd Lieutenant Donald Robins, stayed at the controls to keep the plane straight and level. The two men would remain at their stations even as the fire began to engulf the flight deck. SSgt James E. Halkyard, Pfc Willard L. Money, and Pfc Robert E. Altman were able to escape from the rear of the B-17. MSgt Levin and the navigator, 2nd Lieutenant Joe M. Bean, went out through the nose escape hatch. As Lieutenant Robins climbed through the cockpit's upper escape hatch, the Flying Fortress exploded. Robins was thrown clear, allowing him to deploy his parachute. Kelly was not so fortunate. According to Colonel Eubank's report:

The wreckage of B-17C 40-2045 was found along a rural road 2 miles [3.2 km] west of Mount Aryat (Mount Aryat is about 5 miles [8.0 km] east of Clark Field). The tail assembly was missing. Parts ... were scattered over an area of 500 yards [460 m]. The right wing with two engines still in place remained almost intact although it was burning when the search party arrived. The fuselage and left side of the plane were badly wrecked and burned. T/Sgt Delehanty’s body was lying about 50 yards [46 m] north of the wreckage. Kelly's body ... was found very near the wreckage with his parachute unopened....

The Tainan Zero pilots did not see the bomber explode, having lost it in a cloud, and so were merely credited with a probable kill, shared jointly between pilots Toyoda, Yamagami, Kikuchi, Nozawa, and Izumi. Saburō Sakai, often credited in popular culture with destroying this aircraft, was indeed part of the group that engaged Kelly's bomber, but he and his two wingmen do not appear among the pilots officially credited with the shootdown.

Early reports misidentified the ship Kelly attacked as either the heavy cruiser Ashigara, which was present, or, more frequently, the battleship Haruna, which was not. Some reports went so far as to credit Kelly with crashing his plane into Haruna, sinking the battleship at the cost of his life. In reality, Natori's damage was not serious enough for the ship to sink; the cruiser would remain in service until August 16, 1944, when it would be sunk off Samar by USS Hardhead

== Honors ==
Kelly was posthumously awarded the Distinguished Service Cross for "extraordinary heroism" and "selfless bravery". It was incorrectly claimed in some reports that he had been awarded the Medal of Honor. Kelly was also posthumously awarded the Distinguished Flying Cross and the Purple Heart. Kelly had previously earned the Distinguished Flying Cross for his peace time flight from Hawaii to the Philippines in September 1941, but died before it could be presented to him.

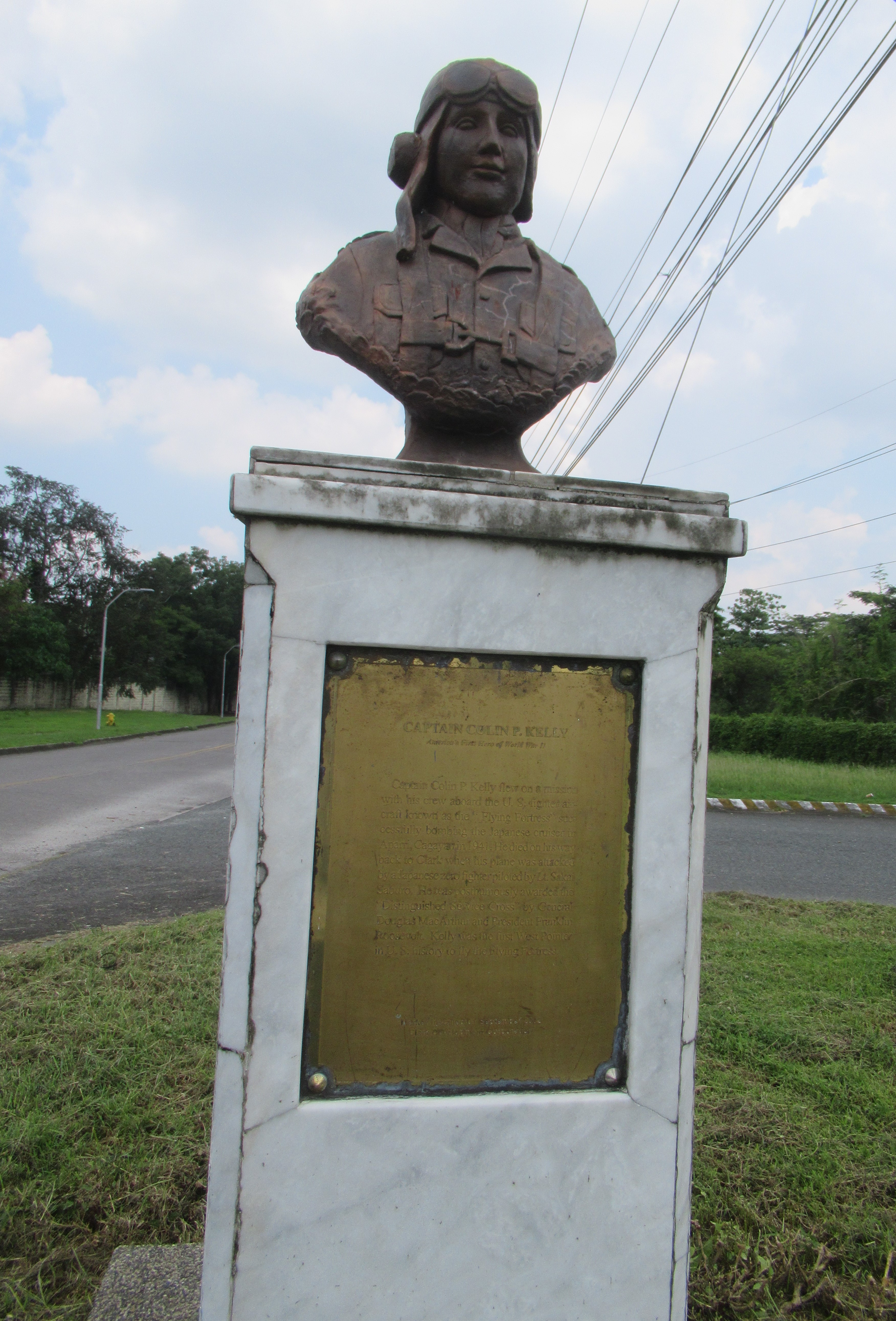
Original Hangars and Flightline - Thirteenth Air Force (Clark Freeport Zone)

The United States Junior Chamber of Commerce posthumously gave its 1941 distinguished service award to Kelly on January 22, 1942, in Chicago. The award is given annually to the man under 35 years of age who has rendered the “most significant” service to the nation.

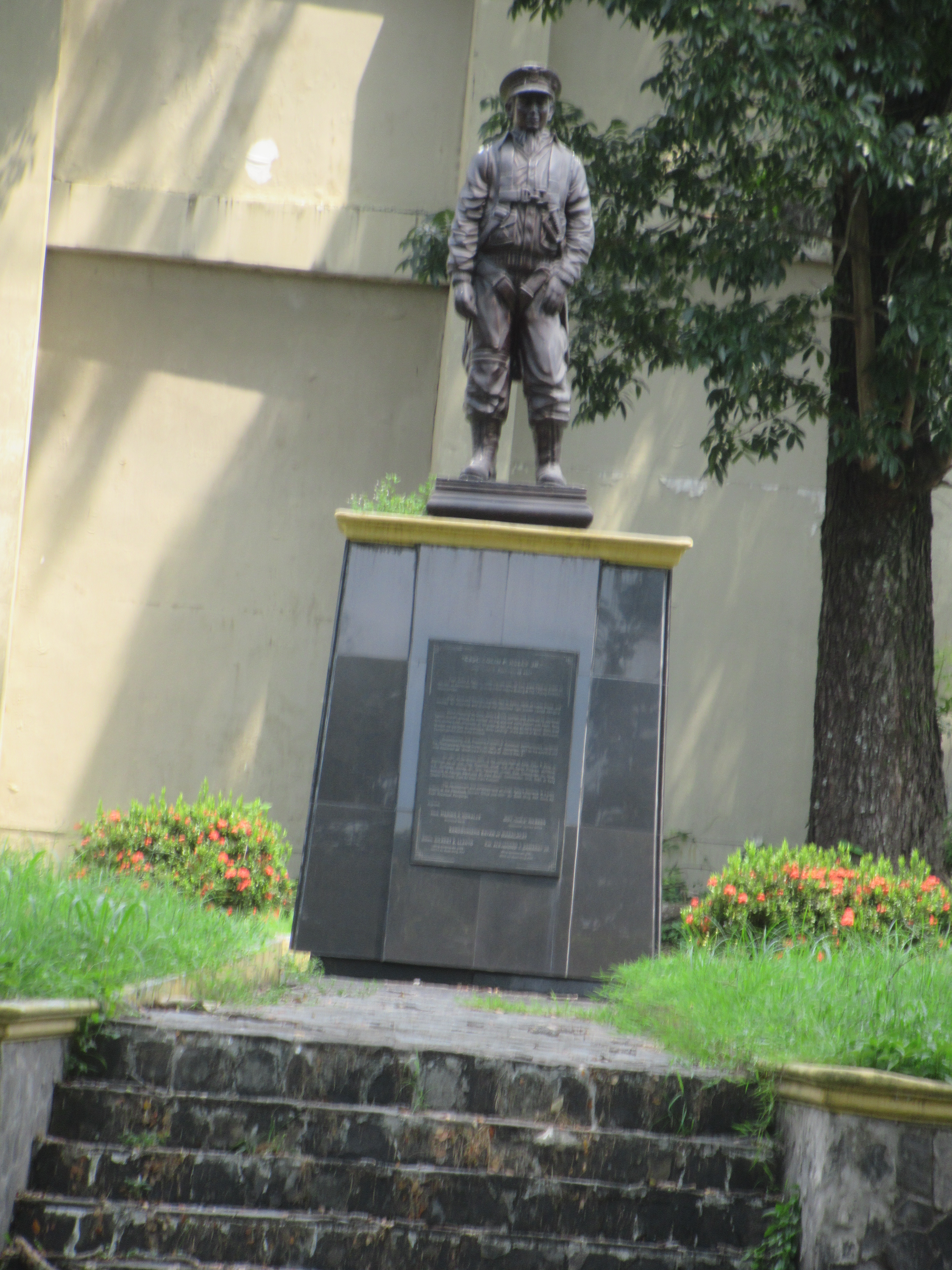
Clark Global City

Aviation artist Robert Taylor painted a picture entitled The Legend of Colin Kelly.

On December 17, 1941, President Franklin D. Roosevelt wrote a letter, "To the President of the United States of America in 1956" asking for an appointment for Kelly's infant son. Colin P. Kelly III went to West Point, but did it on his own taking the examinations and declining the Presidential nomination. He graduated from West Point in 1963.

Colin P. Kelly Jr. Street in San Francisco, near Oracle Park, was named in his honor in 1942. The street had previously been named Japan Street. Colin Kelly Dr. in Dayton, Ohio, is one of many streets near Wright-Patterson Air Force Base named to honor Air Force heroes. Colin Kelly Drive in Forest Acres, South Carolina, is also named in his honor, as is Colin Kelly Street in Cranford, New Jersey. Colin Kelly Rd in South Portland, Maine was one of multiple streets in the city named to honor WW II heroes.

The patriotic song There's a Star-Spangled Banner Waving Somewhere by Paul Roberts and Shelby Darnell (recorded by Elton Britt) places Kelly alongside other legendary Americans in the line "I'll see Lincoln, Custer, Washington, and Perry, / Nathan Hale, and Colin Kelly too".{Published by Bob Miller, Inc., 1619 Broadway, New York, New York. Copyright 1952. Source: sheet music.

He is cited in the 1946 song "Listen Mr. Bilbo" by Bob and Adrienne Claiborne, sung by Pete Seeger, as along with Sgt. Levin "foreigners like those kept America free".

The "Four Freedoms Monument" and Colin Kelly Highway, both in Madison, Florida, are dedicated in his honor.

Colin Kelly Middle School in Eugene, Oregon, was named in his honor in 1945 by the school's first students, who preferred an "ordinary Joe" as a namesake, rather than prestigious military or political figures. The school colors are Kelly green and white, and the nickname originally was "Bombers." In 2009, the nickname was changed to "Pilots." Since the naming in 1945, the school has been renamed to just " Kelly Middle Schools".

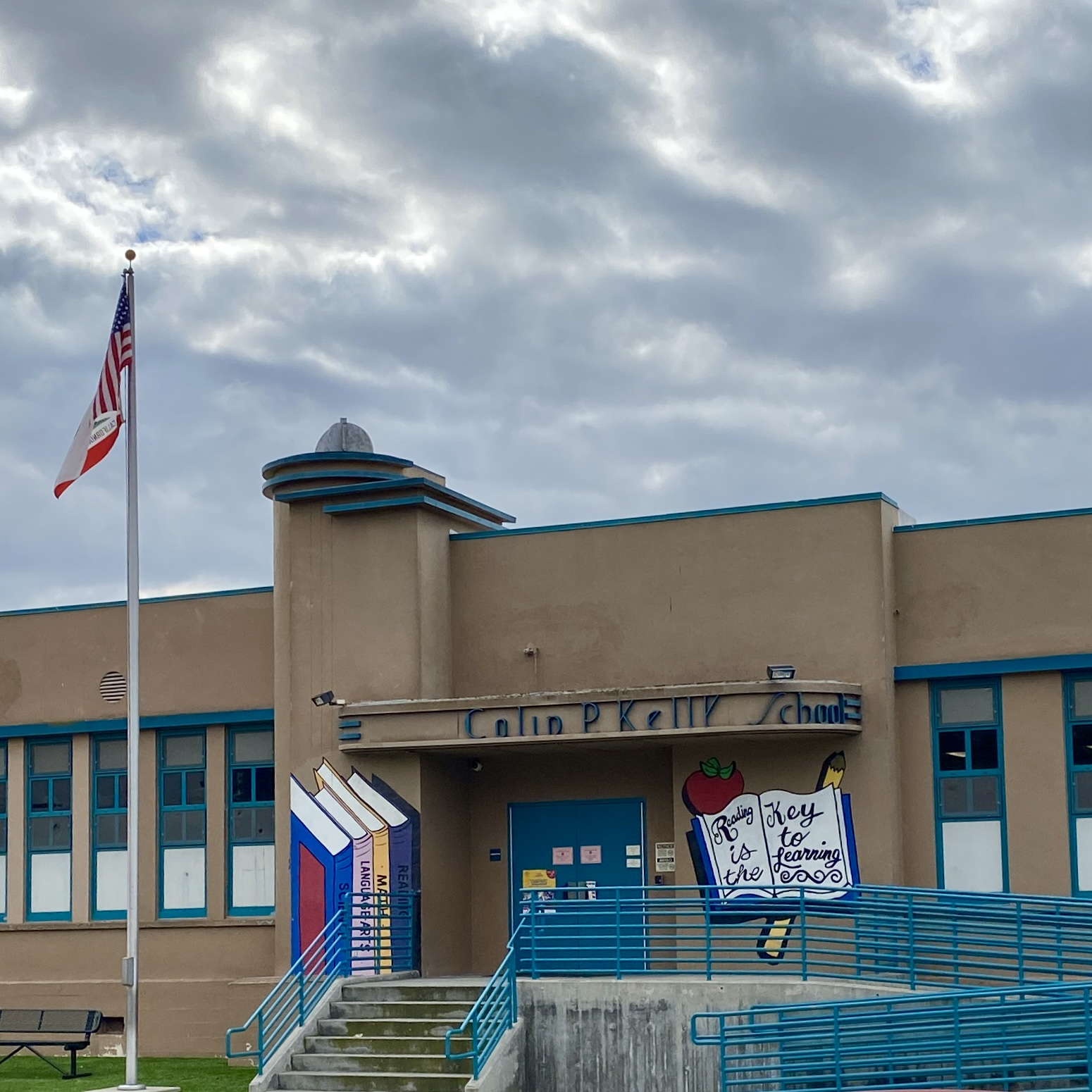
Colin P. Kelly Elementary School (Compton, California)

Colin P. Kelly Elementary School in Compton, California, is named in his honor. The school's mascot is a plane and motto is "soaring to academic excellence".

The Colin Kelly Heights public housing development, in the City of Tonawanda, NY, was named after him. This development was completed in 1943.

Colin Powell adopted the pronunciation /ˈkoʊlɪn/ after friends who were impressed by Kelly began pronouncing Powell's name the same way.

In Madison, Florida, there is the 4 freedoms monument which has a monument to Kelly and there is a post office dedicated to him
