= Pat Boone Sings Days of Wine and Roses =

Pat Boone Sings Days of Wine and Roses and Other Movie Themes

Studio album by Pat Boone
- Released: 1963
- Genre: Pop
- Label: Dot

Pat Boone chronology
Pat Boone Sings Guess Who? (1963)	Pat Boone Sings Days of Wine and Roses and Other Movie Themes (1963)	The Star Spangled Banner (1963)

Professional ratings
Review scores
Source	Rating
AllMusic	4/5 stars
Billboard	positive ("Spotlight" pick)

Pat Boone Sings Days of Wine and Roses and Other Movie Themes is the eighteenth studio album by Pat Boone, released in 1963 on Dot Records.

== Track listing ==
Side one
No.	Title	Writer(s)	Length
1.	"Days of Wine and Roses"		2:37
2.	"Mona Lisa"		2:12
3.	"Love Is a Many-Splendored Thing"		2:35
4.	"Laura"		2:51
5.	"Song from Moulin Rouge"		2:39
6.	"Sweet Leilani"	Harry Owens	2:47

Side two
No.	Title	Writer(s)	Length
1.	"Moon River"		2:21
2.	"Ruby"		2:45
3.	"Three Coins In The Fountain"		2:27
4.	"Be My Love"		2:54
5.	"Fanny"	Harold Rome	2:05
6.	"The Exodus Song"	Gold, Boone	3:09
