= 'Twixt Twelve and Twenty (book) =

1958 book by Pat Boone

’Twixt Twelve and Twenty
- First edition
- Author: Pat Boone
- Language: English
- Publisher: Prentice Hall
- Publication date: 1958
- Publication place: USA

'Twixt Twelve and Twenty is a book by Pat Boone that offered advice to teenagers.

Royalties went to the Northeastern Institution for a Christian education.

The book was a best seller.
