= Pat Boone =

American singer (born 1934)

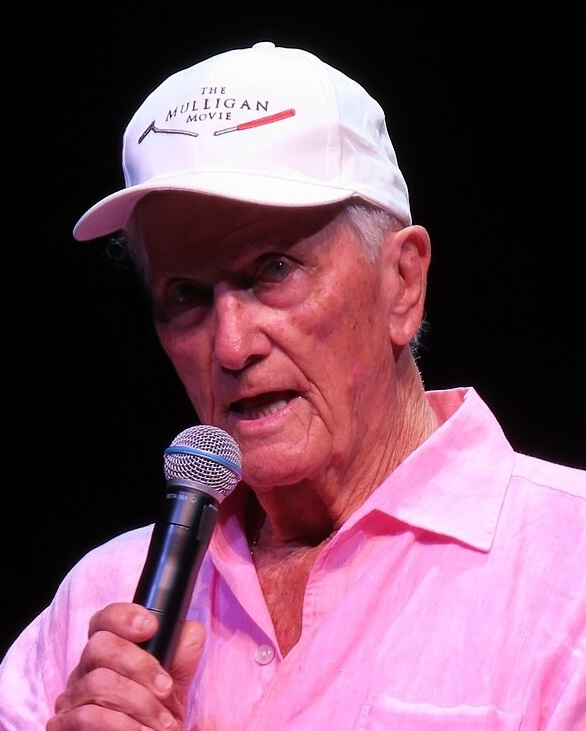
- Boone in 2022

Background information
- Born: Patrick Charles Eugene Boone; June 1, 1934 (age 92); Jacksonville, Florida, U.S.
- Origin: Nashville, Tennessee, U.S.
- Genres: Pop; country; gospel; vocal jazz
- Occupations: Singer; actor; composer
- Works: Discography
- Years active: 1953–present
- Labels: Republic; Dot; London; Stateside; Tetragrammaton; Melodyland (Motown); Lamb & Lion; Hip-O; MCA
- Website: patboone.com

Patrick Charles Eugene Boone (born June 1, 1934) is an American singer, songwriter, actor, author, television personality, radio host, and philanthropist. One of the most popular American recording artists of the 1950s and early 1960s, he has sold nearly 50 million records, charted 38 Top 40 hits in the United States, and appeared in numerous feature films.

Boone was a top draw behind Elvis Presley in popularity during the 1950s,and was ranked by Billboard as one of the top charting artists between 1955 and 1995. He spent 220 consecutive weeks on the Billboard charts with one or more songs each week.

Through the 1960s, Boone remained one of the most popular entertainers in the United States, becoming a teen idol positioned as an alternative to the perceived hedonism of rock and roll, owing to his work as a singer, writer, actor, and religious motivational speaker. In 1957, at age 23, Boone began hosting the half-hour ABC variety series The Pat Boone Chevy Showroom, which aired 115 episodes from 1957 to 1960. Guests included Cliff Richard, Nat King Cole, Edie Adams, Andy Williams, Pearl Bailey, and Johnny Mathis. His cover versions of rhythm and blues songs contributed to the mainstream popularity of rock and roll. Elvis Presley opened for Boone in Cleveland in 1955, and the two later became close friends.

As an author, Boone published the 1958 advice book 'Twixt Twelve and Twenty, which became a number-one bestseller. In the 1960s, he turned his attention to gospel music and was later inducted into the Gospel Music Hall of Fame. He continues to perform as a singer, appear as a motivational speaker, and work as a television personality and conservative political commentator.

== Early life ==
Charles Eugene Boone (known as Pat) was born on June 1, 1934, in Jacksonville, Florida, to Margaret Virginia (née Pritchard) and Archie Altman Boone. When he was two years old, the family moved to Nashville, Tennessee, where he was raised. He graduated in 1952 from David Lipscomb High School in Nashville. His younger brother, Cecil Boone (1935–2023), who performed under the name Nick Todd, was born exactly one year later on June 1 and became a pop singer in the 1950s before working as a church music leader.

In a 2007 interview on The 700 Club, Boone stated that he is a great-great-great-great-grandson of American pioneer Daniel Boone.

Boone primarily attended David Lipscomb College (later Lipscomb University) in Nashville. He continued his higher education at North Texas State University (now the University of North Texas) in Denton, Texas, before ultimately graduating with a bachelor's degree in 1958 from the School of General Studies at Columbia University, magna cum laude.

== Career ==
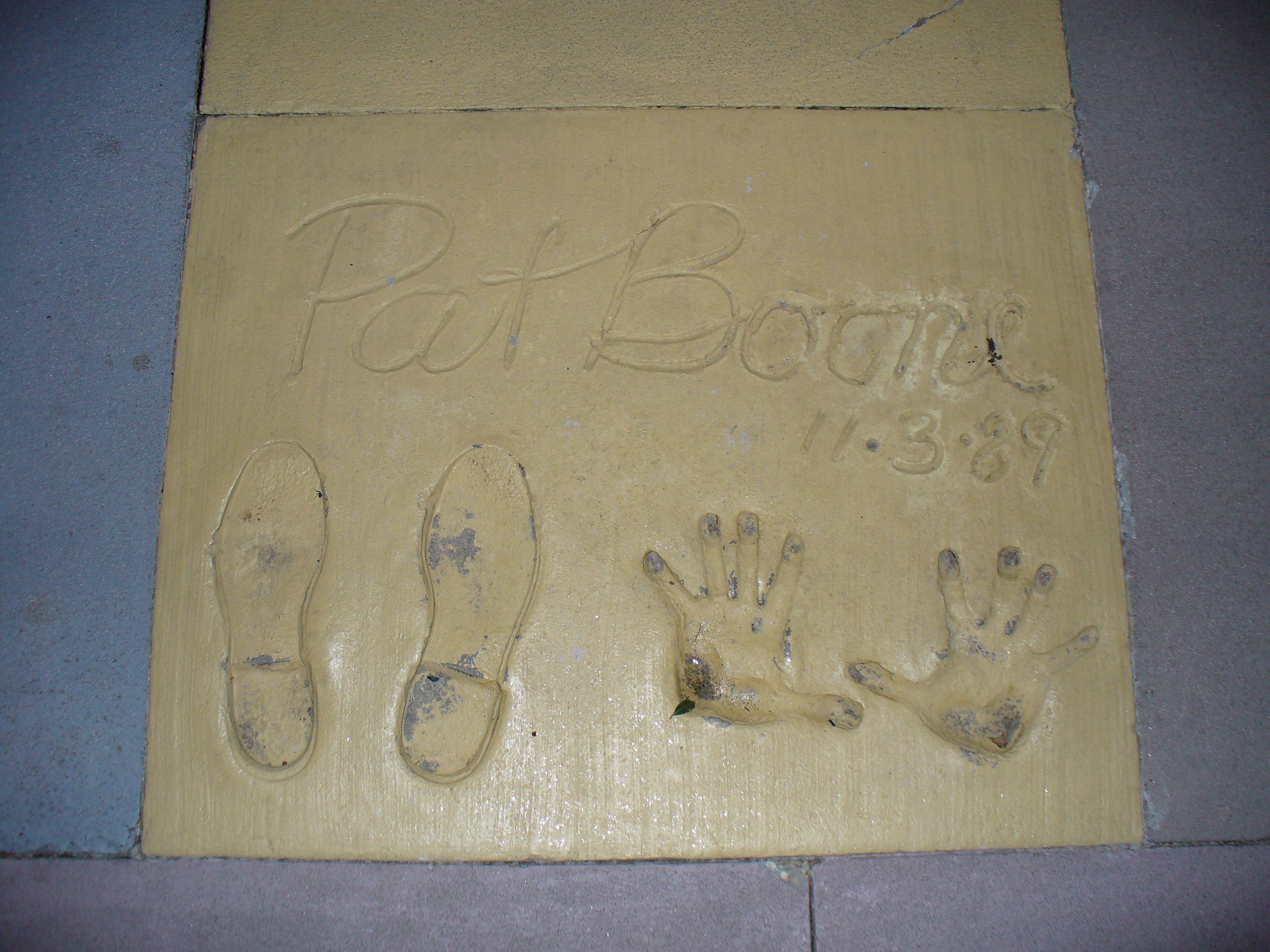
Boone's handprints and shoe prints in front of The Great Movie Ride at Disney World's Disney's Hollywood Studios

=== Music ===
Boone was a student at the California School of Artistic Whistling, which was founded and run by Agnes Woodward. Boone was a whistler since he was a boy, and did the whistling in his song "Love Letters in the Sand".

Boone began his career performing at Sunday concerts in Nashville's Centennial Park. He began recording in April 1953 for Republic Records (not to be confused with the modern label of the same name), and in 1955 signed with Dot Records. That year, his cover of Fats Domino's "Ain't That a Shame" became a hit, setting the tone for the early stage of his career, which often involved covering rhythm and blues songs by Black artists for a predominantly white American audience. Dot's owner, Randy Wood, had released an R&B single by the Griffin Brothers in 1951 titled "Tra La La-a", unrelated to the later LaVern Baker song of the same name, and sought to reuse it after the original failed to chart. It became the B-side of Boone's debut single, "Two Hearts Two Kisses", originally recorded by the Charms.

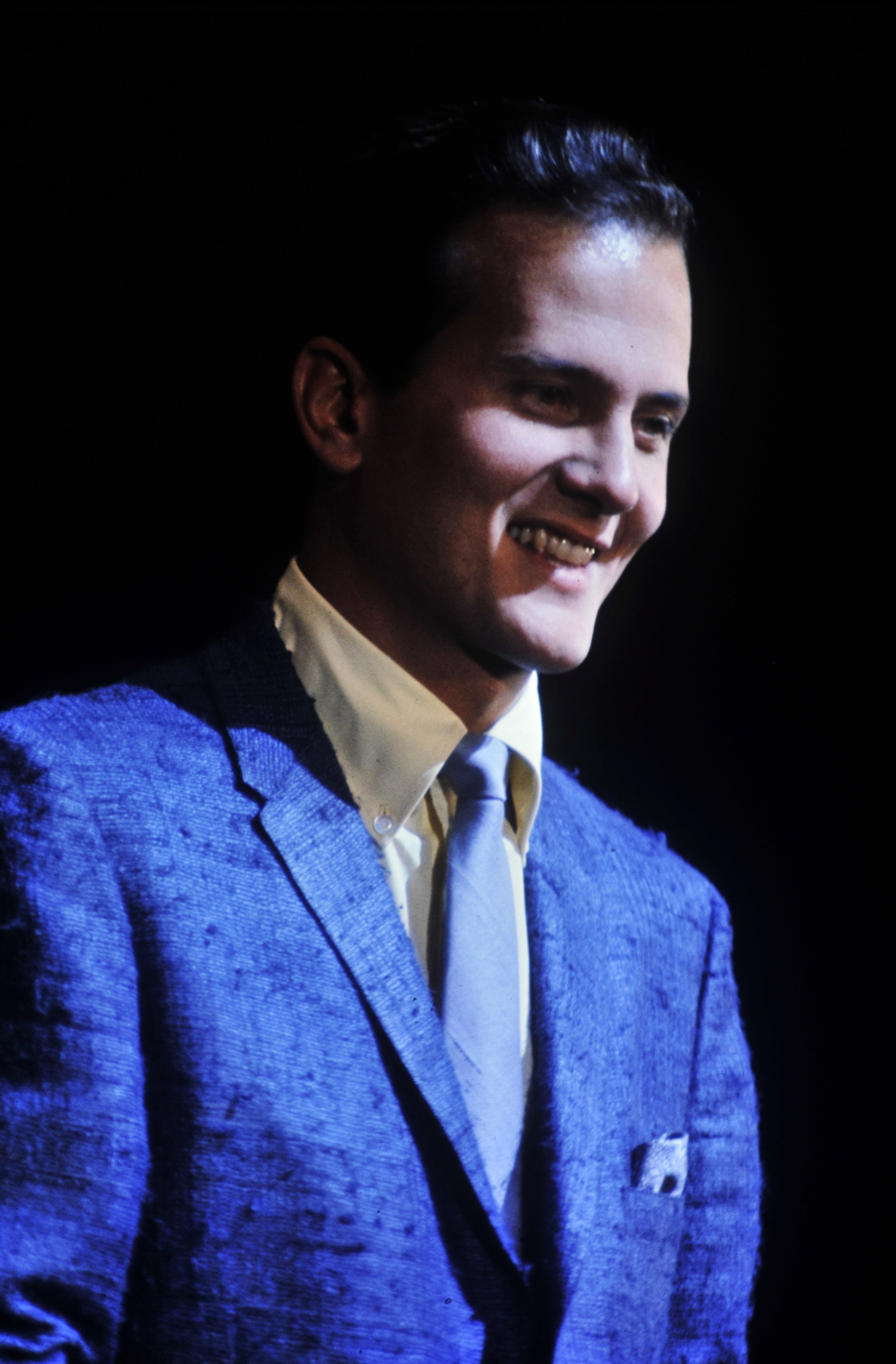
Boone in 1960

In 1956, Boone scored a number-one single with his cover of "I Almost Lost My Mind" by Ivory Joe Hunter, which had previously been recorded by Nat King Cole. According to a 1957 opinion poll of high school students, Boone was favored nearly two-to-one over Elvis Presley among boys and almost three-to-one among girls. During the late 1950s, he was a regular on ABC-TV's Ozark Jubilee, hosted by his father-in-law, Red Foley. He cultivated a safe, wholesome, and advertiser-friendly image, which earned him a long-term endorsement deal with General Motors. In the late 1950s he succeeded Dinah Shore in promoting Chevrolet, singing the company's advertising jingle "See the USA in your Chevrolet". GM also sponsored Boone's television program, The Pat Boone Chevy Showroom.

Many of Boone's most successful recordings were covers of songs first released by Black artists. In addition to "Ain't That a Shame", he recorded "Tutti Frutti" and "Long Tall Sally" by Little Richard, "At My Front Door" by The El Dorados, the blues ballad "I Almost Lost My Mind" by Ivory Joe Hunter, "I'll Be Home" by the Flamingos, and "Don't Forbid Me" by Charles Singleton. Boone's versions were part of a broader trend in the 1950s in which white performers recorded rhythm and blues songs for mainstream audiences. Some critics have cited this practice as an example of cultural whitewashing, arguing that it sanitized the music for white listeners and limited recognition for the original Black artists.

Boone wrote the lyrics to the instrumental theme of the 1960 film Exodus, composed by Ernest Gold, which Boone titled "This Land Is Mine".

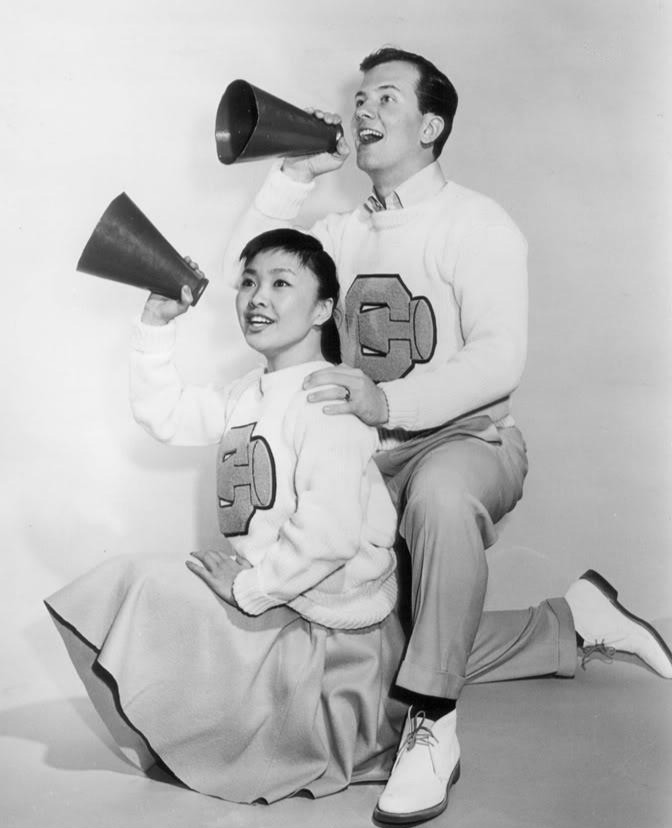
Pat Suzuki with Pat Boone during The Chevy Showroom Show in 1959.

As a conservative Christian, Boone declined songs and film roles that he felt compromised his beliefs, including one with Marilyn Monroe. In his early film April Love (1957), director Henry Levin asked him to kiss co-star Shirley Jones; since it would be his first onscreen kiss, Boone first sought his wife's approval before filming the scene. He founded his own production company, Cooga Mooga Productions.

From 1955 to 1957, Boone was a regular on Arthur Godfrey and His Friends, and later hosted the Thursday-night variety program The Pat Boone Chevy Showroom. In 1959, his likeness was licensed to DC Comics, appearing first in Superman's Girl Friend, Lois Lane No. 9 (May 1959) before headlining his own five-issue comic series from September 1959 to May 1960.

Boone popularized Speedy Gonzales in a 1962 single. It peaked at the No. 6 Billboard Hot 100 position in 1962 during a total chart run of 13 weeks, doing better in many national charts in Europe, where it sold a million copies.

In the early 1960s, he authored a series of self-help books for adolescents, beginning with 'Twixt Twelve and Twenty. The British Invasion which hit the United States in 1964, curtailed his run as a hitmaker, though he continued recording throughout the decade. In 1966, Boone competed in the Sanremo Music Festival in Italy, performing "Mai mai mai Valentina" with Giorgio Gaber and "Se tu non fossi qui" with Peppino Gagliardi. During the trip, he visited Ferrari headquarters in Maranello, intending to buy a Superfast, but was persuaded by Enzo Ferrari to instead purchase a four-door Ferrari 2+2 for his family. Boone later recalled selling the car—"the Ferrari (I) didn't like"—to comedian Tom Smothers.

In the 1970s, he switched to gospel and country; he also continued performing in other media. In the 1960s and 1970s, the Boone family toured as gospel singers. The family also made gospel albums, such as The Pat Boone Family and The Family Who Prays.

In 1973, he released S-A-V-E-D, a gospel-studio album. Two songs of the album were written by his friend Johnny Cash, who said of it:

I'm deeply honored that you would record two of my songs in this album. This is the ultimate for me, that Pat Boone would sing any of my songs

— Johnny Cash, 1973

In the early 1970s, Boone founded the record label Lamb & Lion Records, with himself, the Pat Boone Family, Debby Boone, Dan Peek, DeGarmo and Key, and Dogwood as the principal artists.

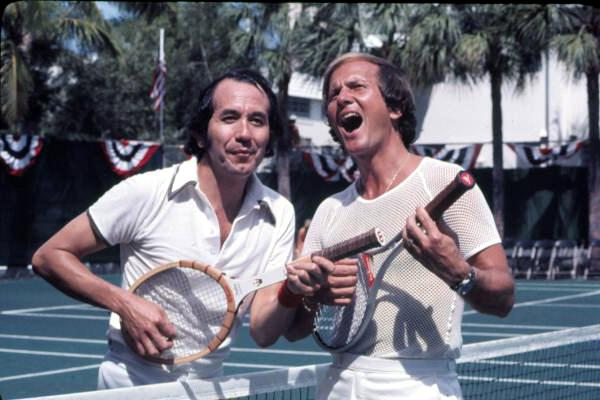
Musician Trini Lopez and Boone during a tennis event at Fort Lauderdale, Florida (April 1975)

In 1974, Boone was signed to the Motown country subsidiary Melodyland.

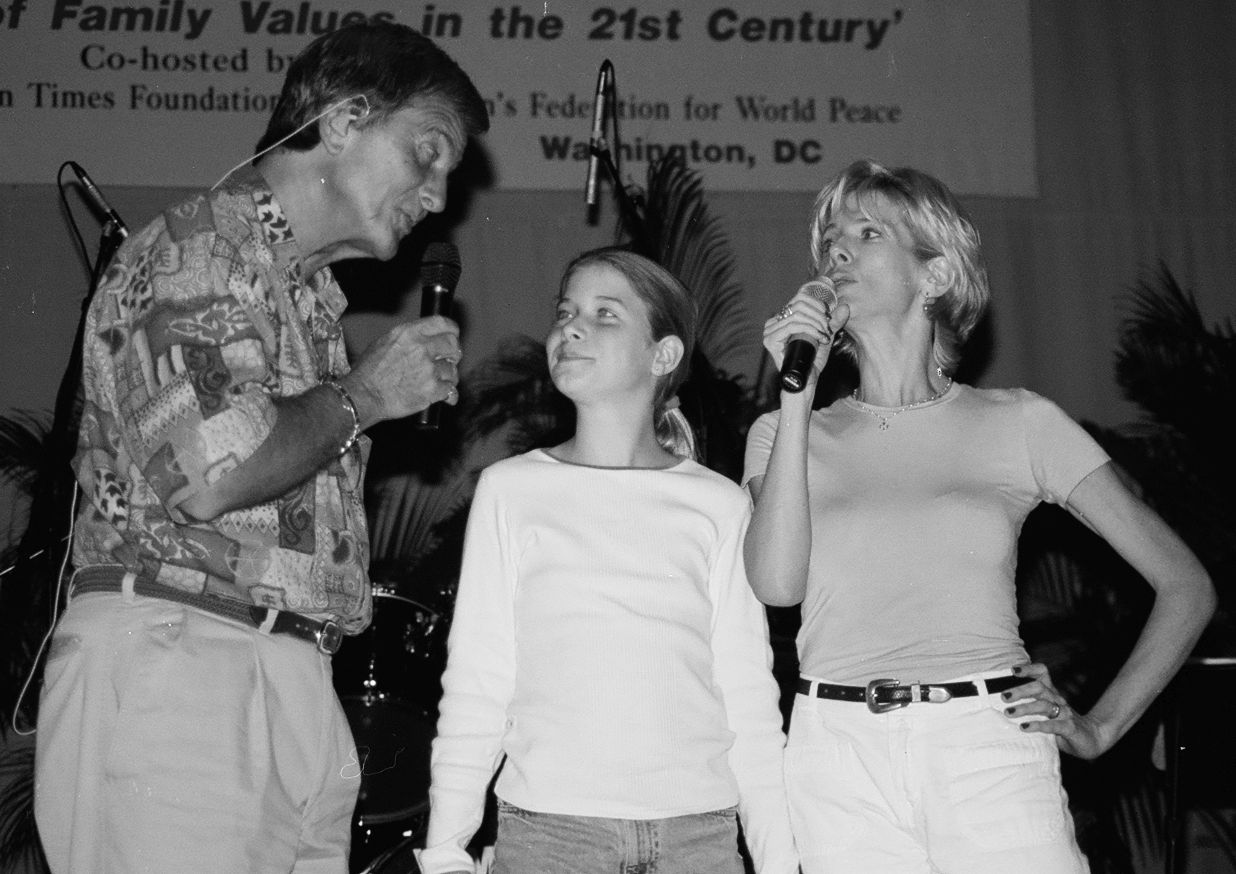
Pat and daughter Debby Boone singing to a fan in Washington, D.C., 1997

In 1978, Boone became the first target in the Federal Trade Commission's crackdown on false-claim product endorsements by celebrities. He had appeared with his daughter Debby in a commercial to claim that all four of his daughters had found a preparation called Acne-Statin a "real help" in keeping their skin clear. The FTC filed a complaint against the manufacturer, contending that the product did not really keep skin free of blemishes. Boone eventually signed a consent order in which he promised not only to stop appearing in the ads, but also to pay about 2.5% of any money that the FTC or the courts might eventually order the manufacturer to refund to consumers. Boone said, through a lawyer, that his daughters actually did use Acne-Statin, and that he was "dismayed to learn that the product's efficacy had not been scientifically established as he believed."

Boone hosts a weekly radio show, the Pat Boone hour, on the 50s Gold channel on SiriusXM.

=== Later work ===
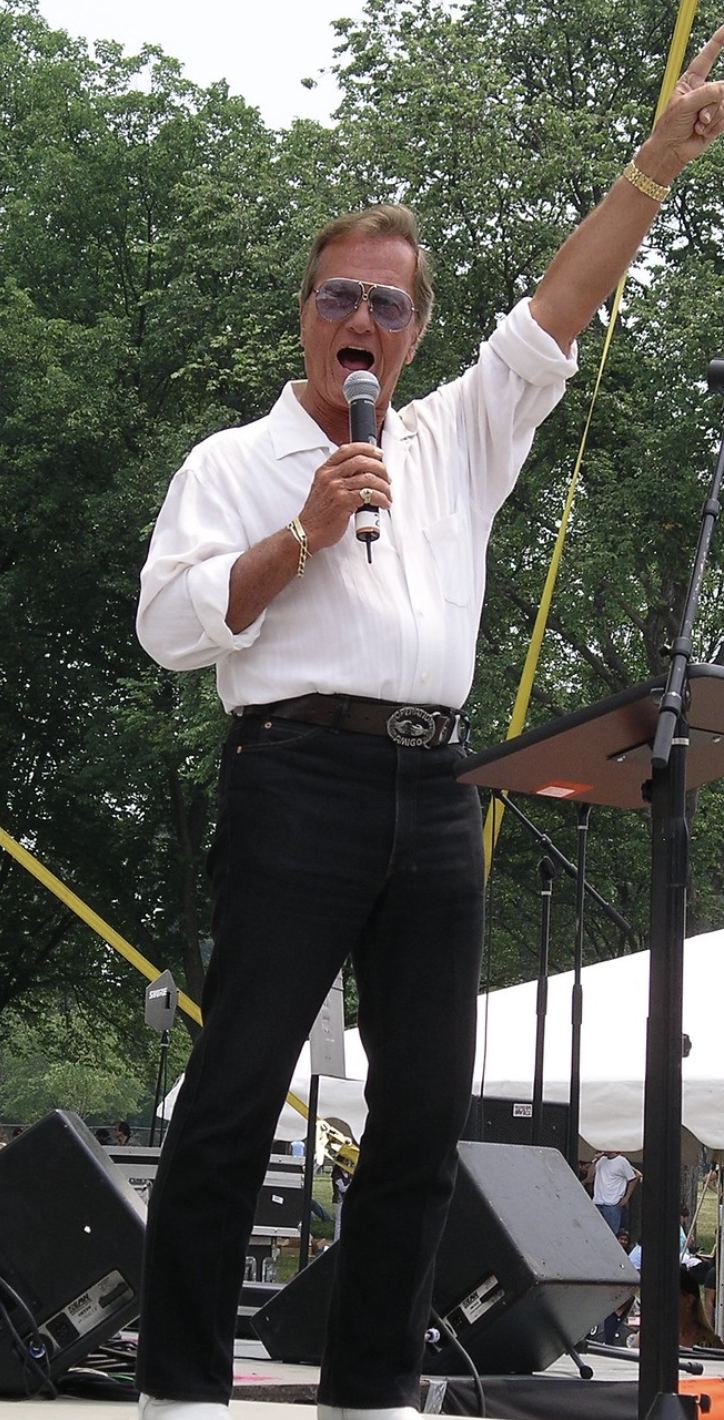
Pat Boone during the 2007 Memorial Day concert in Washington, D.C.

In 1994, Boone played the title role in The Will Rogers Follies in Branson, Missouri. In 1997, he released In a Metal Mood: No More Mr. Nice Guy, a collection of heavy metal covers. To promote it, he appeared at the American Music Awards in black leather, which resulted in his dismissal from Gospel America, a TV show on the Trinity Broadcasting Network. After a special appearance on TBN with the president of the network, Paul Crouch, and his pastor, Jack Hayford, his explanation of the leather outfit being a "parody of himself" was accepted. TBN reinstated him, and Gospel America returned on air. In 2003, the Nashville Gospel Music Association recognized his gospel career by inducting him into the Gospel Music Hall of Fame. In 2006, Boone released We Are Family: R&B Classics, featuring cover versions of 11 R&B hits, including the title track, plus "Papa's Got A Brand New Bag", "Soul Man", "Get Down Tonight", "A Woman Needs Love", and six other classics.

In 2010, plans were announced for the Pat Boone Family Theater at Broadway at the Beach in Myrtle Beach, South Carolina, but the attraction was never built.

In 2011, Boone acted as spokesperson for Security One Lending, a reverse mortgage company. He has also acted as a spokesperson for Swiss America Trading Corporation, a broker of gold and silver coins that warns of "America's Economic Collapse".

In 2023, Boone was a guest vocalist on Born to Be Wild, an album by Ann-Margret, for a duet, "Teach Me Tonight". The following year, at 90, he released a single, "Where Did America Go?"

In 2025, Boone set the record for the longest span between entries on Billboard's Adult Contemporary chart, achieving this record with his song "One - Voices for Tanzania". His initial appearance on the chart was with "Moody River" on July 17, 1961, and his return after 63 years, 8 months, and 3 weeks.

== Personal life ==
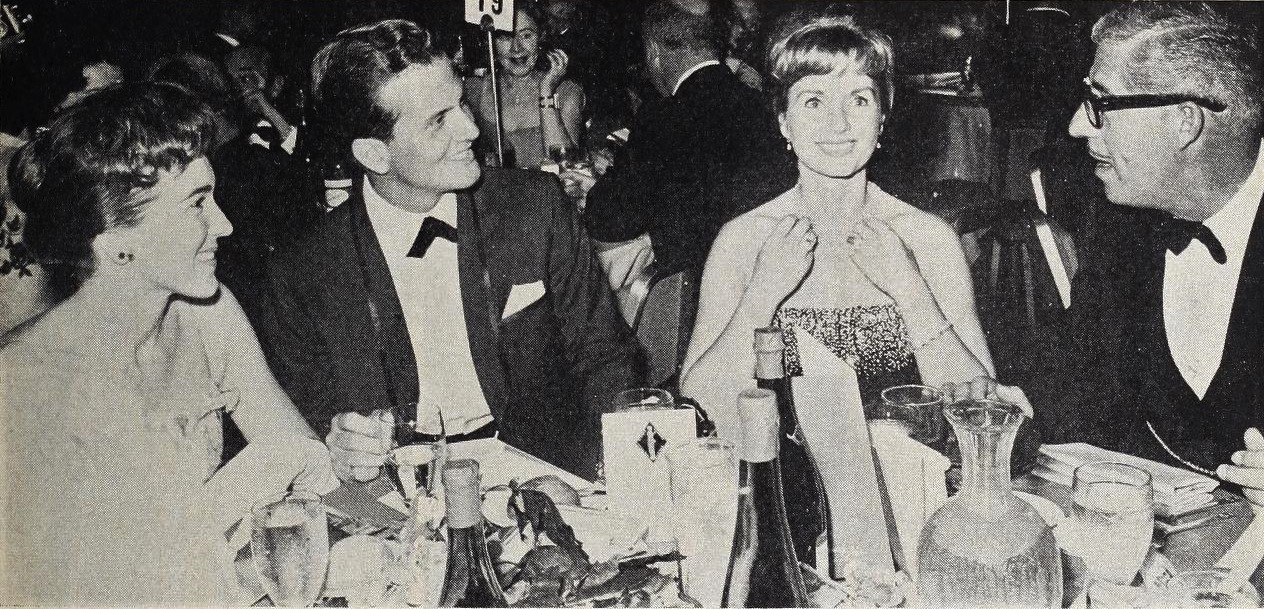
Shirley and Pat Boone with Debbie Reynolds and her husband Harry Karl, 1960

In 1953, Boone married Shirley Lee Foley, the daughter of Red Foley and Judy Martin. The Boones had four daughters, including Cherry and Debby.

In the late 1950s, Boone and his family were residents of Teaneck, New Jersey. Shirley Boone was also a recording artist and television personality, though less known than her husband. She founded a hunger-relief Christian ministry that evolved into Mercy Corps. She died in 2019, aged 84, at the couple's Beverly Hills home.

=== Politics ===
Boone has been a close friend to many U.S. presidents, including Ronald Reagan and Jimmy Carter. Boone supported Barry Goldwater in the 1964 United States presidential election.

At a 1961 gathering at Pepperdine College, Boone said, "I would rather see my four girls shot and die as little girls who have faith in God than leave them to die some years later as godless, faithless, soulless communists."

Boone is a staunch supporter of Israel and he shares a close relationship with Prime Minister Benjamin Netanyahu.

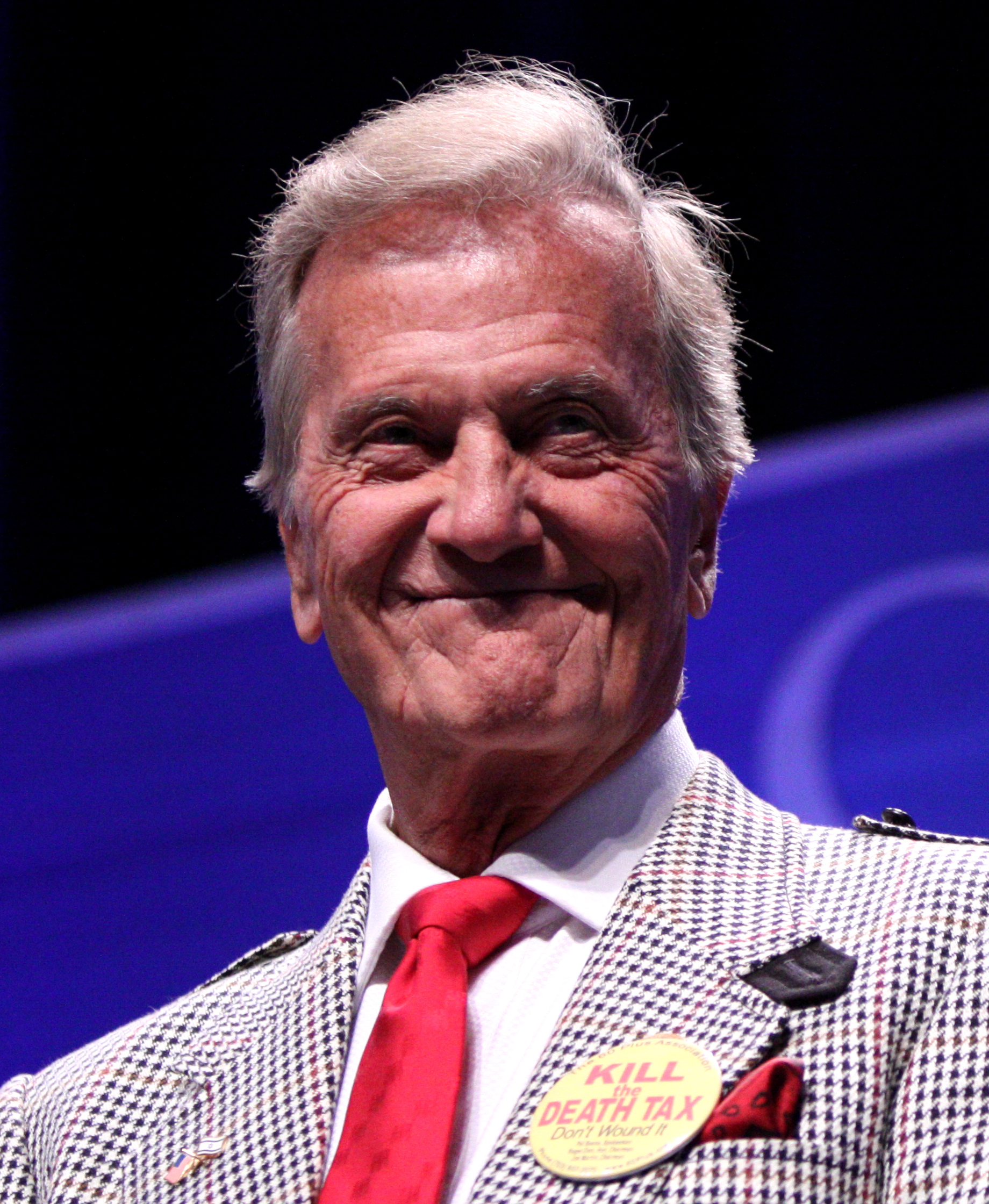
Boone at CPAC in February 2011

In the 2007 Kentucky gubernatorial election, Boone campaigned unsuccessfully for incumbent Republican Ernie Fletcher with a recorded automated telephone message stating that the Democratic Party candidate Steve Beshear would support "every homosexual cause". As part of the campaign, Boone asked, "Now do you want a governor who'd like Kentucky to be another San Francisco?" In 2009, during Barack Obama's first term in office, Boone wrote an article comparing liberalism to cancer, likening it to "black filthy cells". In December 2009, Boone endorsed conservative Republican John Wayne Tucker in Missouri's 3rd congressional district against incumbent Russ Carnahan in the 2010 midterm elections. In 2010, Boone endorsed Republican Clayton Trotter in the race for Texas's 20th congressional district with an ad campaign referencing his song "Speedy Gonzales", about the Looney Tunes character. Boone received a lifetime achievement award at the 38th annual Conservative Political Action Conference held in 2011.

In 2016, Boone, with Mike Huckabee and executive producer Troy Duhon, all of whom were involved in the film God's Not Dead 2, sent a letter to California Governor Jerry Brown in opposition to Senate Bill 1146, which "prohibits a person from being subjected to discrimination" at California colleges. Other than schools that train pastors and theology teachers, schools "might no longer be allowed to hire Christian-only staff, teach religious ideas in regular classes, require attendance at chapel services, or keep bathrooms and dormitories restricted to either males or females".

=== Basketball ===
Boone is a basketball fan and had ownership interests in two teams. He owned a team in the Hollywood Studio League called the Cooga Moogas, which included Bill Cosby, Rafer Johnson, Gardner McKay, Don Murray, and Denny "Tarzan" Miller. When the American Basketball Association launched in 1967, Boone was the majority owner of the league's team in Oakland, California. The team was first named the Oakland Americans, but was soon renamed the Oakland Oaks, the name under which it played from 1967 to 1969. The Oaks won the 1969 ABA championship.

Despite their success on the court, the team had severe financial problems. In 1969, Bank of America threatened to foreclose on a $1.2 million loan, and Boone sold the team to a Washington, D.C.-based investment group, and the team became the Washington Caps.

Boone later played for the Virginia Creepers, an 80–84 age group Senior Olympics team that narrowly lost to the gold medal-winning team; Boone aged out at 85 in 2019.

=== Philanthropy ===
Boone and his wife have been active in charitable endeavors. Together, they supported the founding of Mercy Corps in 1981, a global humanitarian organization focused on crisis response and development in over 40 countries. This initiative stemmed from an earlier project, Save the Refugees, which Shirley launched in 1979, during the Cambodian crisis.

The Boones also contributed to the creation of the Shirley and Pat Boone Life Center in Tanzania which provides clean drinking water, medical care, and education to local communities. The couple also created, through a multi-million dollar donation, the Shirley and Pat Boone Center for the Family at Pepperdine University, which educates students on building moral and healthy relationships.

== Artistry and influence ==
Boone has performed in many musical genres such as pop, country music, rock and roll, R&B, gospel, and soul.

=== Popularity ===
It is estimated that over the course of his career, he has recorded more than 2,600 official tracks, making him one of the most prolific artists in music history. He has 38 hits on the U.S. Top 40, securing the number one spot six times. Until the 2010s, he held the record for the most consecutive weeks in the U.S. charts with at least one single in the Top 100, totaling 220 weeks.

No. 1 singles in the United States (Billboard Hot 100):

- "Ain't That a Shame" (1955)
- "I Almost Lost My Mind" (1956)
- "Don't Forbid Me" (1957)
- "Love Letters in the Sand" (1957)
- "April Love" (1957)
- "Moody River" (1961)

No. 1 singles in the United Kingdom (UK Singles Chart):

- "I'll Be Home" (1956)

== Religion ==
Boone grew up in the Church of Christ. In the 1960s, Boone's marriage to Shirley Foley nearly came to an end because of his use of alcohol and his predilection to attend parties. However, after coming into contact with the Charismatic Movement, Shirley focused on her religion and eventually influenced Pat and their daughters to have a similar religious focus. At the time they attended the Inglewood Church of Christ in Inglewood, California.

In 1964, Boone spoke at a "Project Prayer" rally at the Shrine Auditorium in Los Angeles. The gathering, which was hosted by Anthony Eisley, a star of ABC's Hawaiian Eye series, sought to flood the United States Congress with letters in support of mandatory school prayer, following two decisions in 1962 and 1963 of the United States Supreme Court that struck down mandatory prayer as conflicting with the Establishment Clause of the First Amendment to the United States Constitution. Joining Boone and Eisley at the Project Prayer rally were Walter Brennan, Lloyd Nolan, Rhonda Fleming, Gloria Swanson, and Dale Evans. Boone declared, "(W)hat the communists want is to subvert and undermine our young people... I believe in the power of aroused Americans, I believe in the wisdom of our Constitution.... the power of God." It was reported that Roy Rogers, John Wayne, Ronald Reagan, Mary Pickford, Jane Russell, Ginger Rogers, and Pat Buttram endorsed the goals of the rally and would have attended had their schedules not conflicted.

In the early 1970s, the Boones hosted Bible studies for such celebrities as Doris Day, Glenn Ford, Zsa Zsa Gabor, and Priscilla Presley. The Boones attended The Church on the Way in Van Nuys, a Foursquare Gospel megachurch pastored by Jack Hayford.

On a 2016 broadcast of Fox News Radio's The Alan Colmes Show, Boone discussed an episode of Saturday Night Live that included a sketch entitled God Is a Boob Man; the sketch parodied the film God's Not Dead 2, in which Boone had a role. Boone described the sketch as "blasphemy", stating that the Federal Communications Commission should forbid such content and revoke the broadcast licenses of any "network, or whoever is responsible for the shows".

== Film ==
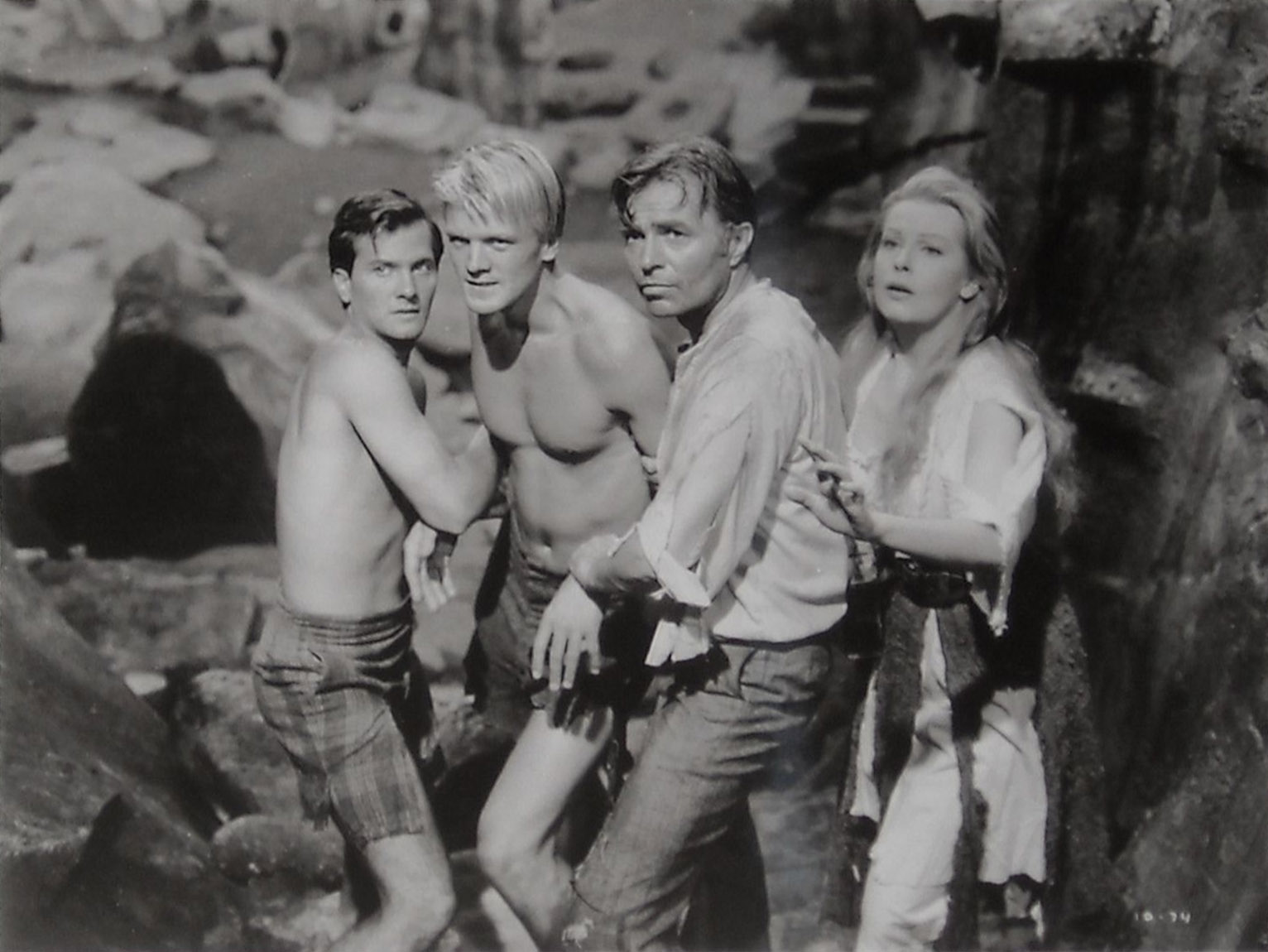
Boone during a scene from the film Journey to the Center of the Earth (1959)

In 1956, Boone was one of the biggest recording stars in the US. Several studios pursued him for movies. He went with 20th Century Fox, which had made Elvis Presley's first movie. Fox reworked a play he had bought, Bernardine, into a vehicle for Boone. It was a hit, earning $3.75 million in the US.

Even more popular was April Love (1957), a remake of Home in Indiana. Boone regards it as one of his favourites, "the kind of movie I wish I could have made 20 more of: a musical, appealing characters, some drama, a good storyline, a happy ending, it's the kind of film which makes you feel good. I never wanted to make a depressing or immoral film."

Less popular was a musical comedy Mardi Gras (1958), which was the last movie directed by Edmund Goulding. However, Journey to the Center of the Earth (1959), a science fiction adventure tale, was a huge hit. Boone had been reluctant to do it, and needed to be persuaded by being offered the chance to sing several songs and getting a percentage of the profits, but was glad he did.

He produced and starred in a documentary, Salute to the Teenagers (1960), but did not make a film for a while, studying acting with Sanford Meisner. He returned with a military comedy, All Hands on Deck (1961), a mild hit.

He was one of several names in another remake, State Fair (1962), which disappointed at the box office. Musicals were becoming less fashionable in Hollywood, so Boone took on a dramatic role in the Metro-Goldwyn-Mayer-distributed The Main Attraction (1962) for Seven Arts Productions, his first movie outside Fox. It was an unhappy experience for Boone as he disliked the implication his character had sex with Nancy Kwan's and he got into several public fights with the producers. He had a deal with Fox to make three films at $200,000 each with his production company. This was meant to start with a thriller, The Yellow Canary (1963), in which Boone would play an unsympathetic character. New management came in at the studio, which was unenthusiastic about the picture but because Boone had a pay or play deal, it was made, but with a much-reduced budget. Boone paid some money out of his own pocket to help complete it.

Boone's next movie at Fox was another low-budget effort, The Horror of It All (1963), shot in England. He made a comedy in Ireland, Never Put It in Writing (1964), for Allied Artists. Boone's third film for Fox was an "A" production, Goodbye Charlie (1964), but he was supporting Debbie Reynolds and Tony Curtis. He was one of the many names in The Greatest Story Ever Told (1965) and appeared in The Perils of Pauline (1967), a pilot for a TV series that did not eventuate, which was screened in some theatres. Boone's last film of note was The Cross and the Switchblade (1970).

== Discography ==
Studio albums

- Pat Boone
- Howdy!
- "Pat"
- Hymns We Love
- Pat Boone Sings Irving Berlin
- Star Dust
- Yes Indeed!
- Tenderly
- Pat Boone Sings
- Side by Side (with Shirley Boone)
- He Leadeth Me
- White Christmas
- Moonglow
- This and That
- Great! Great! Great!
- Moody River
- My God and I
- I'll See You in My Dreams
- Pat Boone Reads from the Holy Bible
- Pat Boone's Golden Hits Featuring Speedy Gonzales
- Love You Truly (with Shirley Boone)
- Pat Boone Sings Guess Who?
- Pat Boone Sings Days of Wine and Roses
- The Star Spangled Banner
- Tie Me Kangaroo Down Sport
- Sing Along Without Pat Boone!
- The Touch of Your Lips
- Ain't That a Shame
- The Lord's Prayer and Other Great Hymns
- Boss Beat!
- Near You
- Blest Be Thy Name
- The Golden Era of Country Hits
- My 10th Anniversary with Dot Records
- Pat Boone Sings Winners of the Reader's Digest Poll
- Great Hits of 1965
- Memories
- Wish You Were Here, Buddy
- Christmas Is A Comin'
- How Great Thou Art
- I Was Kaiser Bill's Batman
- Look Ahead
- Departure
- Songs for Jesus Folk
- In the Holy Land
- The New Songs of the Jesus People
- All in the Boone Family
- Born Again
- Family Who Prays
- Pat Boone S-A-V-E-D
- I Love You More and More Each Day
- Pat Boone with the First Nashville Jesus Band
- Thank You Dear Lord
- The Pat Boone Family
- Songs from the Inner Court
- Something Supernatural
- Texas Woman
- The Country Side of Pat Boone
- Miracle Merry-Go-Round
- Just the Way I Am
- Songmaker
- A Pocketful of Hope
- Pat Boone Sings Golden Hymns
- I Remember Red: A Tribute to Red Foley
- The Pat Boone Family Christmas
- In a Metal Mood: No More Mr. Nice Guy
- Echoes of Mercy
- The Miracle of Christmas
- American Glory
- Nearer My God to Thee
- Glory Train: The Lost Sessions
- Dream of Ireland
- Hopeless Romantic
- We Are Family: R&B Classics
- Ready to Rock
- In A Symphonic Mood
- The True Spirit of Christmas
- Near
- Legacy
- Pat Boone's Favourite Bible Stories & Sing-Along Songs

== Filmography ==
- 1955: The Pied Piper of Cleveland (documentary)
- 1957: Bernardine
- 1957: April Love
- 1958: Mardi Gras
- 1959: Journey to the Center of the Earth
- 1960: Salute to the Teenagers (TV documentary) (producer and host)
- 1961: All Hands on Deck
- 1962: State Fair
- 1962: The Main Attraction
- 1963: The Horror of It All
- 1963: The Yellow Canary
- 1964: Never Put It in Writing
- 1964: Goodbye Charlie
- 1965: The Greatest Story Ever Told
- 1967: The Perils of Pauline
- 1969: The Pigeon
- 1970: The Cross and the Switchblade
- 1986: The Fall Guy (TV series; episode "Beach Blanket Bounty")
- 1989: Roger & Me (documentary)
- 1990: Music Machine (voice of Mr. Conductor)
- 1991: Benny's Biggest Battle (voice of Mr. Conductor)
- 1993: The Statler Brothers Show (TV series)
- 1994: Precious Moments: Simon the Lamb (voice of The Shepherd)
- 1997: Space Ghost Coast to Coast (TV series)
- 2000: The Eyes of Tammy Faye (documentary)
- 2008: Hollywood on Fire (documentary)
- 2016: Boonville Redemption
- 2016: God's Not Dead 2
- 2017: A Cowgirl's Story
- 2022: The Mulligan
- 2024: Reagan

=== Box-office ranking ===
Boone was considered one of the top box-office stars in the U.S. as judged by the Quigley Poll of Movie Exhibitors in its Annual "Top Ten MoneyMakers Poll":

- 1957: 3rd most popular star
- 1958: 11th most popular
- 1959: 22nd most popular
- 1960: 22nd most popular

== Bibliography (works published by Boone) ==
- 'Twixt Twelve and Twenty: Pat talks to Teenagers (1958) Prentice Hall
- "Between You, Me and the Gatepost" (1960) Prentice Hall
- The Solution to Crisis-America (1970) F. H. Revell Co, ISBN 0-8007-8081-7
- A Miracle Saved My Family (1971) Oliphants, ISBN 0-551-00640-4
- The Real Christmas (1972) F. H. Revell Co, ISBN 0-8007-0546-7
- Joy! (1973) Creation House, ISBN 0-88419-060-9
- My Brother's Keeper? (1975) Victory Press, ISBN 0-85476-237-X
- My Faith (1976) C. R. Gibson Co, ISBN 0-8378-1764-1
- To Be or Not to Be an SOB: A Reaffirmation of Business Ethics (1979) Wordware Publishing, Incorporated, ISBN 0-89015-737-5
- The Honeymoon Is Over (1980) Creation House, ISBN 0-88419-130-3
- Marrying for Life: A Handbook of Marriage Skills (1982) HarperCollins Publishers, ISBN 0-86683-674-8
- Pray to Win (1982) Putnam Pub Group, ISBN 0-399-12494-2
- Pat Boone's Favorite Bible Stories (1984) Creation House, ISBN 0-88419-245-8
- Pat Boone's Favorite Bible Stories for the Very Young (1984) Random House of Canada, Limited, ISBN 0-394-85891-3
- A Miracle a Day Keeps the Devil Away (1986) Revell, ISBN 0-8007-0693-5
- New Song (1988) Impact Books, ISBN 0-86608-003-1
- Miracle of Prayer (1989) Zondervan, ISBN 0-310-22131-5
- The Human Touch: The Story of the National Easter Seal (1990) Certification Review, ISBN 0-914373-22-6
- Jesus Is Alive (1990) Thomas Nelson Inc, ISBN 1-55894-219-X
- Double Agent (2002) Publish America, Incorporated, ISBN 1-59129-469-X
- Goodnight, Whatever You Are!: My Journey with Zacherley, the Cool Ghoul (2006) Tradeselect Limited, ISBN 1-933384-03-4
- Pat Boone's America: A Pop Culture Treasury of the Past Fifty Years (2006) B&H Publishing Group, ISBN 0-8054-4376-2
- Culture-Wise Family: Upholding Christian Values in A Mass-Media World (2007) Gospel Light Publications, ISBN 0-8307-4355-3
- The Marriage Game (2007) New Leaf Press, Inc., ISBN 0-89221-114-8
- Questions About God: And the Answers That Could Change Your Life (2008) Lighthouse Publishing, ISBN 1-935079-13-1
- Pat Boone Devotional Book (2009) G. K. Hall, ISBN 0-8161-6630-7
- If: The Eternal Choice We All Must Make: Pat Boone, ISBN 9781948014458

== Bibliography ==
- University of North Texas Alumni Directory, Pat (Charles E.) Boone, (1994) OCLC 768191551
- ASCAP Biographical Dictionary, fourth edition, compiled for the American Society of Composers, Authors and Publishers, by Jaques Cattell Press, R. R. Bowker (1980) OCLC 7065938 ISBN 0-8352-1283-1 ISBN 978-0-8352-1283-0
- Biographical Dictionary of American Music, edited by Charles Eugene Claghorn (1911–2005), Parker Publishing Co., West Nyack, New York (1973) OCLC 609781 ISBN 0-13-076331-4 ISBN 978-0-13-076331-0
- Encyclopedia of Evangelicalism, by Randall Herbert Balmer, Baylor University Press (2004) OCLC 191038717 ISBN 1-60258-038-3 ISBN 978-1-60258-038-1
- The Encyclopedia of Folk, Country & Western Music, second edition, by Irwin Stambler (born 1924) and Grelun S. Landon (1923–2004), St. Martin's Press (1983) OCLC 8430828 ISBN 0-312-24818-0 ISBN 978-0-312-24818-5
- Baker's Biographical Dictionary of Musicians, eighth edition, revised by Nicolas Slonimsky, Macmillan Publishing Co. (1992) OCLC 24246972 ISBN 0-02-872415-1 ISBN 978-0-02-872415-7
- Baker's Biographical Dictionary of Musicians, ninth edition, edited by Laura Kuhn, Schirmer Books (2001) OCLC 44972043 ISBN 0-02-865525-7 ISBN 978-0-02-865525-3
