= There's a Star-Spangled Banner Waving Somewhere =

Song by Elton Britt
- Published: 1942
- Released: 1942
- Recorded: March 19, 1942
- Genre: Country / American patriotic
- Label: Bluebird
- Songwriters: Paul Roberts and Shelby Darnell

"There's a Star-Spangled Banner Waving Somewhere" is an American patriotic anthem written in 1942 and credited to Paul Roberts (pen name of Paul Metivier, 1915–2007) and Shelby Darnell (a pseudonym of songwriter Bob Miller, 1895–1955). The initial release, also in 1942, by Elton Britt became the first country music song to sell over a million records.

== History ==
The song was completed, along with other tunes, on Swan's Island, Maine, where Paul Roberts visited and performed with his soon to be wife, Annie Marrithew, during World War II. Roberts' lyrics were published as a poem in the Morning Sentinel of Waterville, Maine, on April 30, 1942. The poem's second stanza differs somewhat from the published song lyrics, while the first and third stanzas of the poem and the song are the same. Whether Bob Miller (credited as "Shelby Darnell") actually had a role in authoring the lyrics in unclear—Roberts placed a notice in the Morning Sentinel at the end of 1942 stating, in part, "Please do not be swayed by any person claiming to have written or helped in any way to write the song."

The song enjoyed its greatest popularity during the war years. The "somewhere" in the title of the song refers to an idealistic version of heaven reserved for the brave American soldiers fighting the Axis powers, somewhat akin to the concept of Valhalla. The verses are a narrative of a young disabled man, who still yearns to fight and earn his place in this patriotic afterlife. The lyrics mention several American military figures: Abraham Lincoln, George Armstrong Custer, George Washington, Matthew C. Perry, Nathan Hale and Colin Kelly—the first four are mentioned by surname only.

Elton Britt's version was recorded in March 1942 and released by early June. It reached No. 7 on the Billboard magazine pop chart. President Roosevelt asked Britt to perform the song for him at the White House. With Britt's version selling well over one million copies, the song was country music's greatest World War II hit. However, Your Hit Parade did not feature the song, due to it being of the country music genre.

Numerous performers have recorded "There's a Star-Spangled Banner Waving Somewhere" through the years. Jimmy Wakely recorded a version in June 1942. Gene Autry sang the song on his Sergeant Gene Autry Show on August 16, 1942. Country singer Wynn Stewart included the song on his 1968 Capitol Records album In Love.

Other lyrics to this melody have been recorded by "Red River Dave" McEnery in 1960, called "Ballad of Francis Powers". This is a song about the American pilot, Francis Gary Powers, who had been shot down on a spy mission over Soviet territory and captured by the Soviets, who charged him with espionage and sentenced him to 10 years imprisonment; the new lyrics describe Powers singing "There's A Star-Spangled Banner Waving Somewhere" in prison.

== Sources ==
- Wolfe, Charles K.; Akenson, James Edward (2005). Country Music Goes To War. University Press of Kentucky. ISBN 0813123089. OCLC 56421871.
