= Bob Miller (songwriter) =

American composer & publisher (1895–1955)

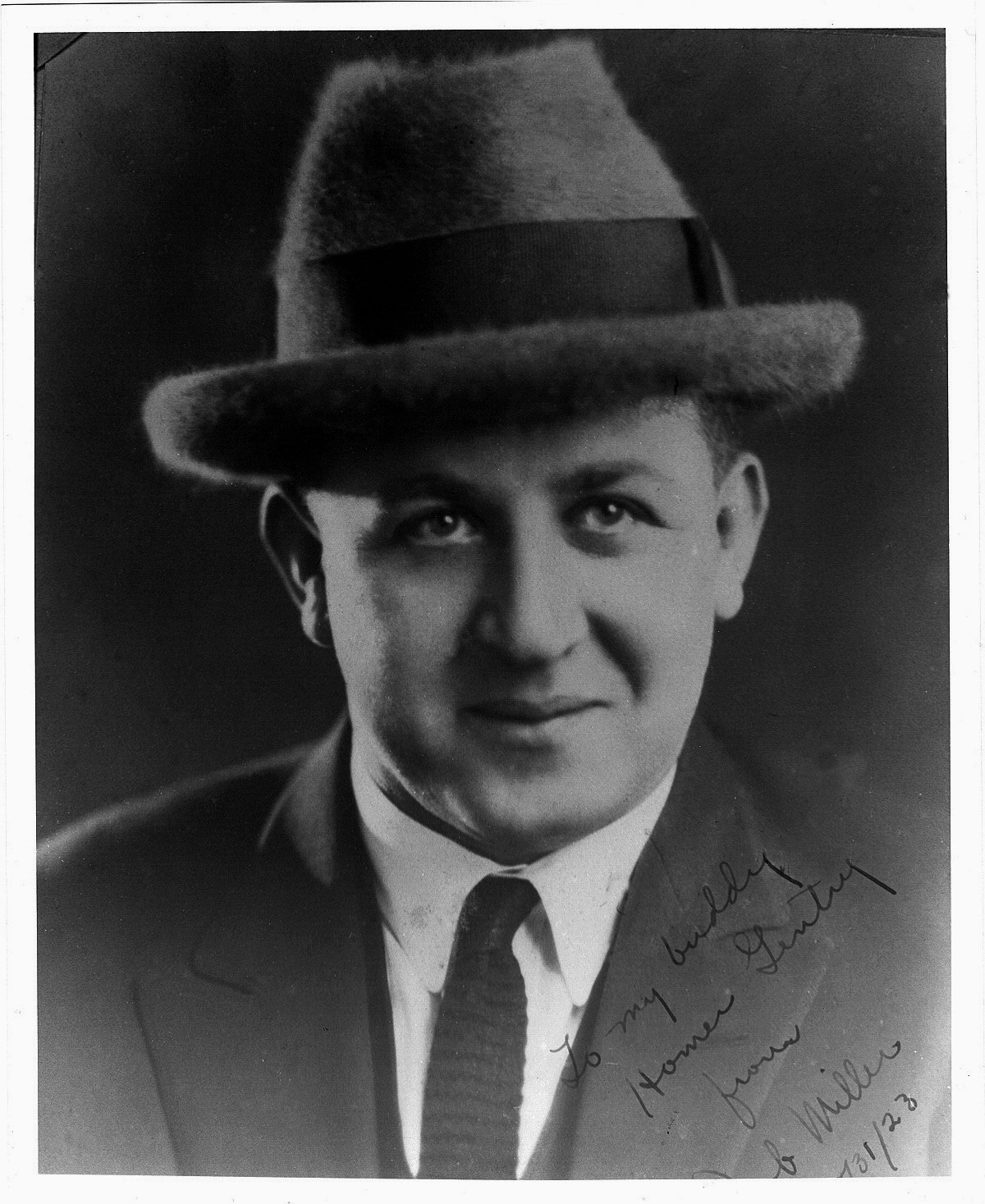
- Miller in the c.1923
- Born: September 20, 1895; Ansonia, Connecticut, United States
- Died: August 26, 1955 (aged 59)
- Occupations: Songwriter; recording artist; A&R representative; publisher

Bob Miller (September 20, 1895 – August 26, 1955) was an American songwriter, recording artist, A&R representative, and publisher.

He claimed to have written over 7,000 songs. His career began in the 1920s, during which time he likely travelled back and forth between Memphis and New York in order to establish himself as a songwriter. In 1928, he moved to New York permanently; and in 1933, he started up his publishing company, Bob Miller Inc. That same year, he became a member of the American Society of Composers, Authors and Publishers (ASCAP). Over the course of his career, he wrote songs such as "Sweet Pal," "War Horse Mama," "Twenty-One Years," "Eleven Cent Cotton, Forty Cent Meat," "The Poor, Forgotten Man," "There's a Star-Spangled Banner Waving Somewhere," "Seven Beers With the Wrong Woman," and many others.

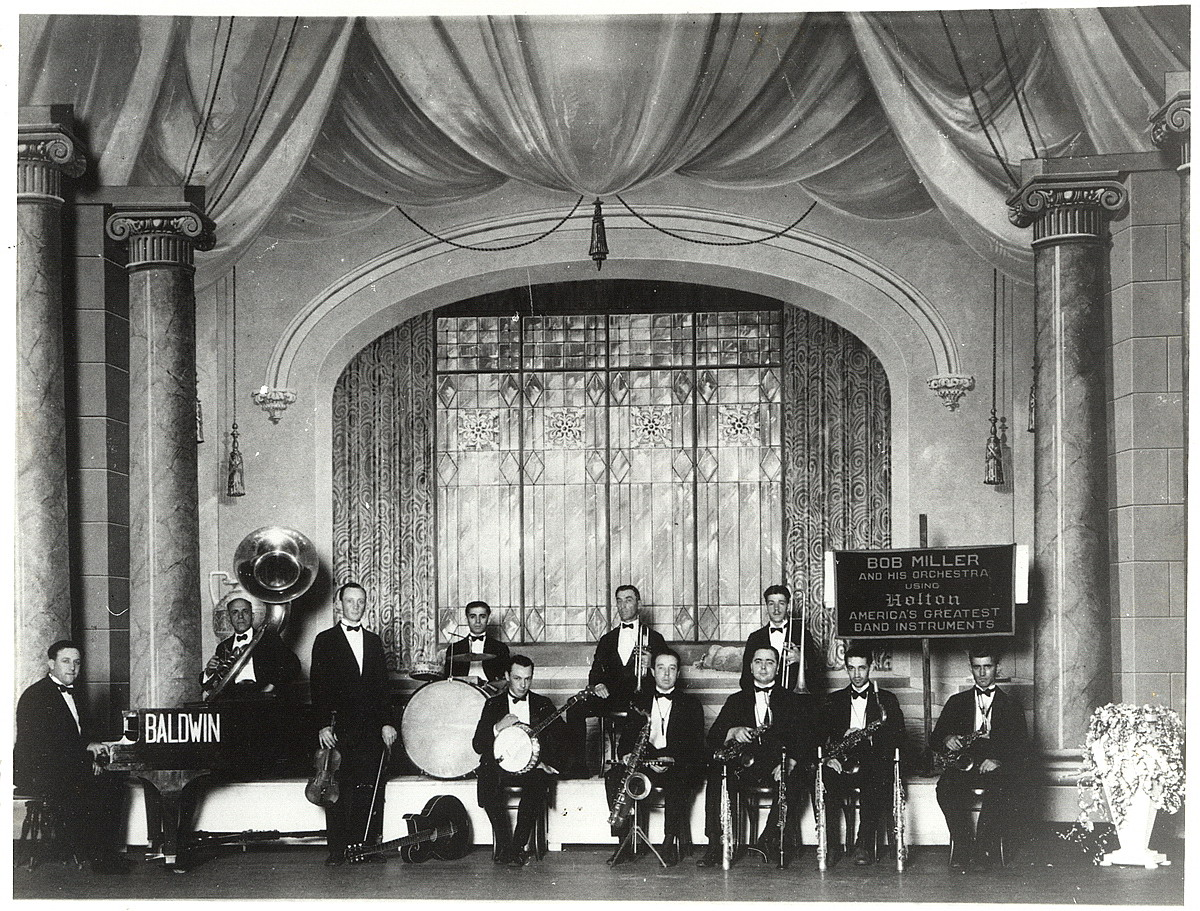
One iteration of Miller's 1920s orchestra

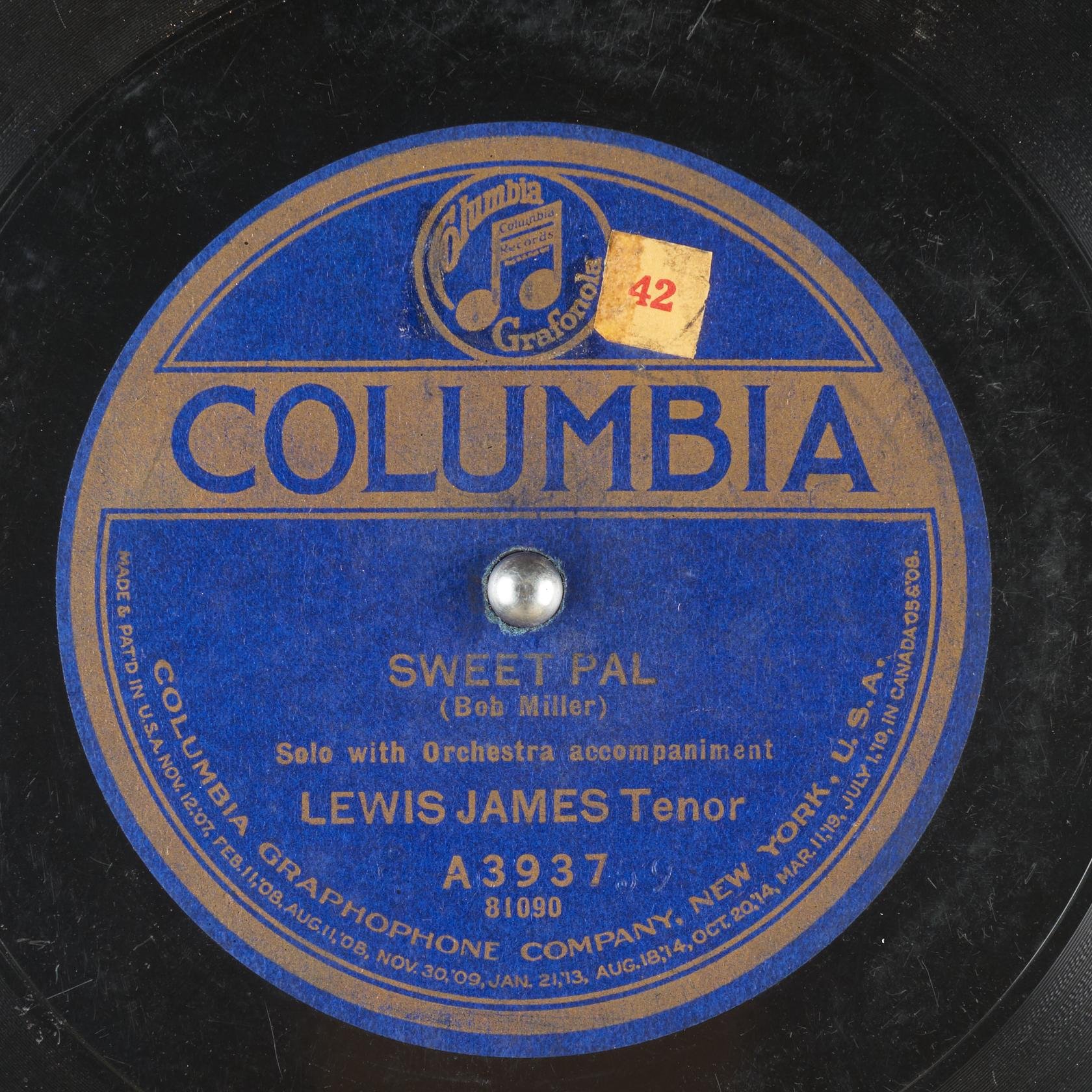
Miller's "Sweet Pal" recorded by Lewis James in 1923

== Early life ==
Miller was born in Ansonia, Connecticut. Though he had older siblings, he was the first child born in the United States to Russian immigrants. At some point in the first decade of the twentieth century, he was orphaned and sent to Memphis, Tennessee, to live. He began playing piano at a young age, and he said that he ran away to New Orleans at the age of eleven. In other sources, he is said to have run away at the age of thirteen. Regardless of when he ran away, he ended up back in Memphis before the 1920s.

== Early career ==
In 1922, he became the bandleader aboard the Idlewild, a Mississippi River steamship that offered evening and weekend excursions featuring music and dancing. He began publishing songs in the early 1920s. Some of his songs like "Sweet Pal" were typical to the popular music of the time period, but the majority of his early work was in the blues genre. His own publishing company on Beale Street published his blues as part of his "African Opera Series." The E. B. Marks Music Company came across a couple of these tunes and acquired them, and these two songs were recorded by female artists for Columbia Records. Leona Williams recorded Miller's "Uncle Bud" in 1922 (Columbia A3736), and Viola McCoy recorded "Strut Long Papa" under the pseudonym Amanda Brown in 1923 (Columbia A3867). In total, eleven of his blues were issued on records during the 1920s, and Clara Smith alone recorded three of his blues.

"The Heebie Jeebie Blues," part of Miller's African Opera Series

He was one of the first musicians to perform live on WMC (AM). Beginning in early 1923, Miller and his orchestra were regularly featured on Memphis radio programming. His performances included popular songs from the day, as well as his original tunes. Between 1923 and 1925, Miller earned a living publishing his songs, performing aboard the Idlewild and performing on the radio. Beginning in 1925, Miller's Idlewild Orchestra, sometimes called the Bob Miller Orchestra, toured regionally around Memphis. In December 1927, they were recorded by Columbia Records in Memphis, and one song, a version of the standard "Shine On, Harvest Moon," was released in early 1928 (Columbia 1262-D).

== New York years ==
In 1928, Miller began writing country songs, and he moved to New York the same year. He recorded many of his songs himself, but some of his songs were recorded by artists such as Vernon Dalhart, Carson Robison, and Frank Luther. His first copyrighted and recorded country song, "Eleven Cent Cotton, Forty Cent Meat," was issued under his Columbia Records pseudonym Bob Ferguson (Columbia 15297-D). He co-wrote this song with a Memphis woman named Emma Dermer, and it was based on a couple of poems that circulated the South between 1926 and 1927. The song's lyrics are referenced in Vonnegut's Slaughterhouse-Five, and a Steinbeck referenced a song called "Ten-Cent Cotton and Forty-Cent Meat" in The Grapes of Wrath, which was written a decade after Miller's song.

Miller played a significant role in the commercial "hillbilly" music industry based out of New York. Before 1933, almost 12,000 hillbilly records were issued. Amazingly, eighty-five percent of these recordings were produced by six artists—Vernon Dalhart, Carson Robison, Arthur Fields, Bob Miller, Frankie Marvin, and Frank Luther. As a recording artist, Miller used multiple pseudonyms. His most common alias was Bob Ferguson (used when recording for Columbia Records); but among others, he also used Slick Palmer, Memphis Bob, Bud Skidmore, and Bob Hill.

While working as a recording artist, Miller also worked as an artists and repertoire (A&R) man. In the late 1920s, he was a recording manager for Columbia, where he managed Columbia's earlier 15000-D series recordings. He later managed Columbia's Atlanta studios, at least for specific sessions; Alton Delmore recalled that Miller sent the Delmore Brothers a letter recruiting them to come to Atlanta for their 1931 recording session.

After forming Bob Miller Inc., Miller published material by other artists in addition to himself. He published music by the Almanac Singers, Patsy Montana, Elton Britt, and many other artists. From the late 1930s until his death in 1955, Miller continued to write songs, but the majority of his efforts centered around his publishing business. He published many of his songs in folios such as Bob Miller's Famous Folio Full of Original Cowboy Songs (1934), and he often used pseudonyms as a writer. For example, he sometimes used the name Vasca Suede when he wrote songs with Western themes. This use of pseudonyms as a writer goes back to his days in Memphis, when he used the pseudonym Trebor Rellim as the lyricist for his blues numbers. Shelby Darnell was the pseudonym he used for his 1942 hit, "There's a Star-Spangled Banner Waving Somewhere," which he co-wrote with Paul Roberts.

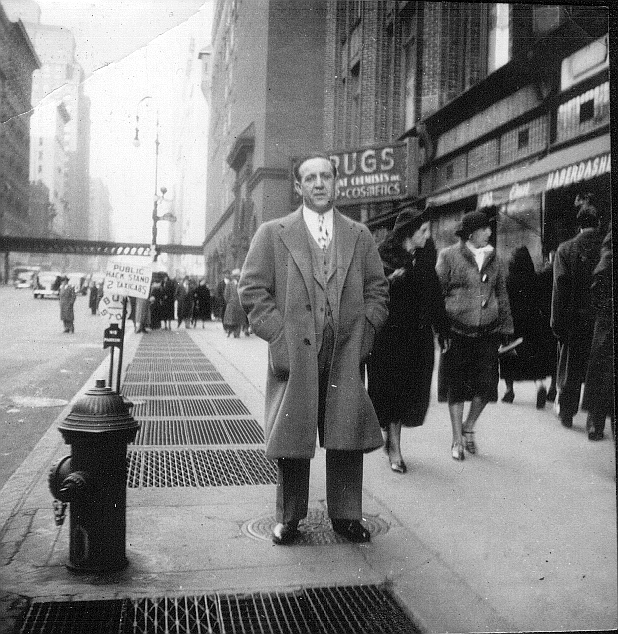
Miller in New York during the late 1930s

== Copyrights held by Miller ==
Miller's copyrights of songs and books (written, co-written, or rearranged by him) listed by year:

=== 1921 (as Robert Miller) ===
- "Ireland My Heart Is With You (Though I'm Many Miles Away)"
- "Love Me"
- "Skeeter Skoot"
- "Uncle Bud (Tennessee Blues)"

=== 1922 (as Robert Miller) ===
- "Mean Eyes"
- "Strut Long Papa, Tom Cat Strut"
- "Sweet Smellin' Mama: Poro Blues"

=== 1923 ===
- "I Told Her Did She Love Me And She Asked Me Yes"
- "Mean Papa Turn In Your Key, You Don't Live Here No More"
- "Nest In Loveland"
- "Strut Long Papa"
- "Sweet Pal"
- "Triflin' Man"
- "War Horse Mama, Pig Meat Sweetie"

=== 1924 ===
- "Cold Weather Papa"
- "He Was A Good Man, But He's Dead And Gone"
- "Heebie Jeebie Blues"
- "I Found A Peanut"
- "I'm Lookin' For My Missin' Rib"
- "War Horse Mama"
- "You're Gonna Wake Some Mornin' But Papa Will Be Gone"

=== 1925 ===
- "He Was A Good Man But He's Dead And Gone"

=== 1926 ===
- "Gerald Chapman"
- "How Could You Ever Forget"

=== 1928 ===
- "Ain't Gonna Grieve My Mind Anymore"
- "Angels Meet Me At The Crossroads"
- "Because We Met"
- "Big Fat Mamma"
- "Cry Baby"
- "Deserted Cabin"
- "Duckfoot Sue"
- "Dying Girl"
- "Eleven Cent Cotton, Forty Cent Meat"
- "Ever Since You Came"
- "Everything Is Just The Same"
- "Five Double You Song, W. W. W. W. W."
- "Frog Song"
- "Girl That You Betrayed"
- "Hill Billy Love Song"
- "How Could You Ever Forget"
- "Hurry Johnie Hurry"
- "I'm Tellin' You The Last Time Now"
- "Kiowana"
- "Little Red Caboose"
- "Missouri Joe"
- "Mule Song"
- "Nobody Cares"
- "Once"
- "Peechee Poochee Papa"
- "She Died For Love"
- "Sing Hallelujah"
- "Sipping Cider"
- "Skeeter And Bumble Bee"
- "Stutters Hymn"
- "Sweet Little Old Lady"
- "Sweet Wimmin"
- "They All Say Goodbye To Me"
- "Two Graves Beside The Road"
- "Two Letters"
- "Unmarked Grave"
- "When The Moon Shines"
- "Where Did You Get That Name"

=== 1929 ===
- "By The Honeysuckle Vine"
- "Dry Votin'"
- "Farm Relief Blues"
- "Farmer's Letter To The President"
- "Forgotten"
- "Golden Wings"
- "Gonna Get On The River"
- "History Of The World"
- "Hobo From The T. M. P. Line"
- "I'll Put On My Long White Robe"
- "I Took My Time A-goin"
- "In The Hills Of Arkansaw"
- "Ivy Covered Cabin"
- "Keep On Keepin' On"
- "'Leven Cent Cotton"
- "Misery In Arkansaw"
- "Mother's Dying Prayer"
- "Sing Fa-de-riddle Sing Da"
- "Sippin Cider"
- "So I Bawt Some Pretzels"
- "Song Of The Blind Child"
- "Sorghum"
- "Toddle Lolly Da"
- "Waiting Song"
- "We're At Peace With The World"
- "What Does The Deep Sea Say"
- "When Evening Winds Are Sighing Home Sweet Home"
- "Where Did You Get That Name?"
- "Who Is That A Comin' Down The Mountain"
- "Wild And Reckless Hobo"

=== 1930 ===
- "Captain Dan's Last Trip"
- "Dangerous Nan McGrew"
- "Doctor And The Undertaker"
- "Little Old Red Lantern"
- "Nebuchudneezer"
- "Ohio Prison Fire"
- "Poker Alice"
- "Prisoner's Letter To The Governor"
- "They're Hanging McCarthy Tomorrow"
- "Twenty-one Years Is A Mighty Long Time"

=== 1931 ===
- "Bank Failures"
- "Beyond Prison Walls"
- "By A Little Bayou"
- "Corn Pone And Pot Likker"
- "Death Of Jack Legs Diamond"
- "Lonesome Cowboy"
- "Shoes"
- "Twenty One Years"
- "Vote Away Our Bread Line Blues"
- "1930 Drought"

=== 1932 ===
- "Ain't It Grand To Be Bloomin' Well Dead"
- "All Bound Down In Prison"
- "Baby Please Come Back"
- "Behind The Big White House"
- "Beyond Prison Walls"
- "Bobby Boy Ol' Boy! Ol' Boy"
- "Bummin' On The I. C. Line"
- "By A Little Bayou"
- "Can't Do Without Love"
- "Charles A. Lindbergh, Jr."
- "Charlie The Chis'ler Won't Chisle No More"
- "Circle Has Been Broken"
- "Countin' Cross Ties"
- "Dentist And The Lady"
- "Down By The Old Rustic Well"
- "Farmer Dick Who Lives By The Crick"
- "Fifty Years Repentin'"
- "Free Wheelin' Hobo"
- "From Cradle Bars To Prison Bars"
- "Gene The Fighting Marine"
- "Good Old Beer"
- "Good Old Times Are Comin' Back Again"
- "Grandmother's Bible"
- "He's Too Far Gone"
- "House Where Love Had Died"
- "I Dreamt I Was Pardoned"
- "I Found A Peanut"
- "I'll Look Into The Matter In The Morning"
- "I'm A Fugitive From A Chain Gang"
- "In The Blue Hills Of Virginia"
- "Ivy Covered Cabin"
- "Last Great Round Up"
- "Little Nell"
- "Little Red Caboose Behind The Train"
- "Lonesome Valley"
- "Mister Nobody"
- "My Love's A Country Gal"
- "New Day Is Comin' Mighty Soon"
- "New 21 Years"
- "Old Fashion Girl"
- "Old King Cole"
- "Old Shoes A-Draggin'"
- "Oscar The Oyster Man"
- "Plant A Seed Of Love In Your Heart"
- "Rider Needs A Fast Horse"
- "Rockin' Alone In An Old Rocking Chair"
- "Sad Song"
- "Sadie The Shaker"
- "Scattin' The Skeeter Skoot"
- "Seven Years With The Right Woman"
- "Seven Years With The Wrong Man"
- "Seven Years With The Wrong Woman"
- "She Waits, And Waits, And Waits"
- "Silver Haired Mother"
- "Singing An Old Hymn"
- "Street Department Papa"
- "Sweet Birds"
- "Sweetest Of All My Dreams"
- "Taboo Taboo Ta Bolivar-Bulivar Boo"
- "Taking Those Last Steps"
- "There's A New Star Up In Heaven"
- "Tree That Stands By The Road"
- "Under The Old Umbrella"
- "Unwanted Children From The State Orphan's Home"
- "Unwanted Children In The State Orphans' Home"
- "Wailee Sweet Wailee"
- "Waiting"
- "Walking That Last Mile"
- "What Does The Deep Sea Say"
- "When I Put On My Long White Robe"
- "When The Mellow Moon Is Shining"
- "When The White Azalias Start Blooming"
- "Yazoo Red"
- "Yes Habit"
- "You Could Have Knocked Me Down With A Feather"
- "Young Man"
- "99 Years Still Got 99"

=== 1933 ===
- "Answer To Twenty One Years"
- "Behind The Hills"
- "Buy American"
- "Countin' Cross Ties"
- "Cowboy's Best Friend Is His Horse"
- "Death Of Jimmy Rodgers"
- "Ev'ry Sunday Night Back Home"
- "Glad Hearts"
- "Gonna Rig Myself Up In A Swaller Tail Coat"
- "Good Old Beer"
- "Hope's Forgotten Song"
- "Hour Of Prayer"
- "I Breaka Da Stones"
- "I Found A Peanut"
- "I'm A Fugitive From A Chain Gang"
- "I've Told The Birds And Bees How Lovely You Are"
- "Let's Meet By The Old Oaken Bucket"
- "Lie He Wrote Home"
- "Life Of Jimmie Rodgers"
- "Little Nell"
- "Lonesome Valley"
- "March Faithful Soldiers"
- "Mother Tears"
- "My Valley Of Memories"
- "Old Fashion Dipper That Hangs On A Nail"
- "On The Colorado Trail"
- "Sad Song"
- "Same Kind Of A Wrong Woman A Second Time"
- "Seems I've Always Held Your Hand"
- "Seven Years With The Wrong Man"
- "Shall We Meet On That Beautiful Shore"
- "Song That Never Dies"
- "Sweet Heart Lane"
- "That Funny Little Letter L"
- "There's A New Day Of Hope Comin' Mighty Soon"
- "Twenty One Years"
- "What Does The Deep Sea Say"
- "When It's Harvest Time In Old New England"
- "When The Lilacs Last Bloomed"
- "When You Played The Old Church Organ"
- "Where's Elmer"
- "Where The Mountains Tip Toe To The Sea"
- "Wrong Man And The Wrong Woman Went Back Together Again"
- "You So And So You'll Wish You'd Never Been Born"
- "21 Year Prisoner Is Dead"

=== 1934 ===
- "After Twenty One Years"
- "By The Stump Of The Old Pine Tree"
- "Chime Bells"
- "Courtin' Cowboy"
- "Dust Covered Diary"
- "Have You Written Mother Lately"
- "Killer John Dillinger"
- "Little Chubby Hands, Little Stubby Feet"
- Miller's Famous Hill-Billy Heart Throbs
- Miller's Famous Main Street Songs
- Miller's Folio Full Of Practical Guitar Chords
- Miller's Simplified Illustrated Guitar Method
- "Morro Castle Disaster"
- "Old Family Doctor"
- "Story Of A Dear Old Lady And The Boy With The Twisted Knee"
- "Swaller-Tail Coat"
- "Take Me Home"
- "When I'm Four Times Twenty"
- "Worthy"

=== 1935 ===
- "Down In The Old Home Town"
- "Down Where The Roses Go To Sleep"
- "Flemington Kidnapping Trial"
- "Gladiola Time"
- How To Play Any Melody In Piano Chimes
- "Huey P. Long"
- "I'm In Love With Another Man's Wife"
- "If The Stork Comes To Our House"
- "Innocent Boy"
- "May Days And Grey Days"
- Miller's Famous Folio Full Of Cowboy Songs
- Miller's Famous Folio Full Of Song Hits
- Miller's Modern Piano Accordion Method
- Miller's Modern Simplified Hawaiian Guitar Method
- Miller's Selected Piano Accordion Solos
- "My Best Friend"
- "Paint A Rose On The Garden Wall"
- "Please Let Me Broadcast To Heaven"
- "Sod Buster With The Jug Handle Ears"
- "Swinging Down The Old Orchard Lane"
- "Trial Of Bruno Richard Hauptmann"
- "When I Dream Of My Red River Home"
- "Will Rogers And Wiley Post"
- "Wish I Had My First Wife Back"

=== 1936 ===
- "Are You Angry With Me, Darling"
- "Hinky, Dinky, Parley Voo"
- "I Died A Little Before I Cried"
- "If I Only Could"
- "Nobody's Darling"
- "Pedal Your Blues Away"
- "Please Let Me Walk With My Son"
- "Pucker Up Your Puckerin' Lips, Sing Diddle Dee Diddle Dee Dum"
- "Rain Upon The Roof"
- "Round The G. O. P. Bush"
- "Woman's Answer To Nobody's Darling"

=== 1937 ===
- "Down Where The Watermelon Grows"
- "Get Away Old Maid (Man)"
- "Flop Eared Mule"
- "Froggie Wenta A-Courtin'"
- "Give Me My Pinto Pal"
- "I've Come To Marry You"
- "I Wisht I'd Never Been Borned"
- "Old Ark's A-Moverin'"
- "Old Maid And The Burgler"
- "Polly Jenkins And Her Plow Boys"
- "Puttin' On The Style"
- "Rustler's Daughter"
- "Sara Jane"
- "Silver Dollar Jim"
- "Skeeter And The Bumble Bee"
- "Song For The Rodeo"
- "Sourwood Mountain"
- "Sweet Betsy From Pike"
- "Tumble Weed"
- "Turkey Hash"
- "Way Down In Texas Where The Bluebonnets Grew"
- Western Heart Throbs
- "What Good Is The Sunshine If Flowers Won't Bloom"
- "What Would You Give In Exchange For Your Mother-In-Law"

=== 1938 ===
- Elton Britt's Collection Of Cowboy Songs
- "Golden Rockin' Chair"
- "Has Some One Forgotten"
- "I Married A Mouse Of A Man"
- "Tears Of Palestine"
- "When Rhododendrons Bloom Again"
- "You're On The Right Side Of The Ocean"

=== 1939 ===
- "Honey, I've Got Ev'rything But You"
- "I Keep Lying, Lying, Lying Little White Lies"
- "I'm Gonna Throw My Lasso"
- "I'm Looking For The Bully Of The Town"
- "I'm Just Driftwood On The River"
- "Lavender Cowboy"
- "Patent Leather Boots"'
- Professional Artist Folio
- Professional Artist Folio, No. 2
- "Sweetest Pal In All The World"
- "Things That Might Have Been"
- "Unwanted Sweetheart"
- "What Good Is The Sunshine If Flowers Won't Bloom"
- "What Might Have Been"

=== 1940 ===
- 22 Favorite Hillbilly Songs
- Popular Cowboy Songs
- Professional Artist Folio, No. 4
- Professional Artist Folio, No. 5
- Songs From 'Way Down South
- Western Heart Throbs: Collection Of Favorite Songs

=== 1941 ===
- Comedy Songs
- Professional Artist Folio, No. 6
- Professional Artist Folio, No. 7

=== 1942 ===
- "Beyond the Tide"
- "Black River Jawnie And High Water Lil"
- "Buddy Boy"
- "Corine Corina"
- "Don't Come Knockin' On My Door No More Baby"
- "Fightin' Son-Of-A-Gun"
- "Give 'Em Hell—MacArther"
- "Guy With A Million Bucks"
- "He Was The Fifth To Find The Firth Of Forth"
- "I Ain't Never Loved Before"
- "I Betcha My Heart I Love You"
- "I Laid My Head Upon Your Breast"
- "I'm Nuts About A Military Band When It's Playing Umpa, Umpa, Umpa"
- "I'm Struttin' My Material"
- "In A Little Canning Kitchen Under The Mulberry Tree"
- "In A Swiss Chalet"
- "Light, Stranger, Light"
- "Mademoiselle from Armentières"
- "Next Time You Talk To The Lord Speak A Good Word For Me"
- "Please Don't Leave Me Now"
- "Rookie Polka"
- "Saddle Bag Of Songs"
- "There's a Star-Spangled Banner Waving Somewhere"
- "They Can't Make Us Stay Whipped"
- "Trav'lin' Down The Trail Of June Dreams"
- "We're Gonna Have To Slap The Dirty Little Jap"
- "When The White Azaleas Start Blooming"
- "When This War Is Over"
- "You'll Never Know"

=== 1943 ===
- "I Am Not Ashamed To Cry As Our Beloved Flag Goes By"
- "Thank God That We're Americans, Thank God For The U.S.A."

=== 1944 ===
- "Best Part Of Travel Is Getting Home Again"
- "Biggest Bucket"
- "Black Warrior"
- "Blue Rose"
- "Carrousel March"
- "Cotton Queen"
- "Don't Forget Me My Dear Little Darling"
- "Empty Arms"
- "Gayosa March"
- "Give Me A Pinto Pal"
- "Goodbye, May God Take Care Of You"
- "Has Someone Forgotten"
- "I Beat Out My Brains"
- "I Break-A Da Stones"
- "I Dreamed Myself A Dream Of You"
- "If You Won't Let Me Shoulder A Rifle"
- "I Kicked My Wife Out Of My Bed"
- "I'll Be Gentle With You Darling"
- "I'm A Convict With Old Glory In My Heart"
- "I Married A Mouse Of A Man"
- "Little Silver Bells Will Ring Again For China"
- "Main Street March"
- "Memphis March"
- "Mountain Lake"
- "Mr. O'Malley's March"
- "No One But You"
- "Patent Leather Boots"
- "Seven Women In One"
- "Spring Thaw"
- "Sweetheart Of My Dreams"
- "Them Good Old Times Are Coming Back Again"
- "Tootsie Babe"
- "Torpedoes Away"
- "Truckin' On Down To London Town"
- "Way Down In Texas"
- "What Would You Give In Exchange For Your Mother-In-Law"
- "Where The Good Cats Go"
- "White Azaleas"

=== 1945 ===
- "Answer To Twenty Ones Years"
- "Best Part Of Travel Is Getting Home Again"
- "Birmingham Woman"
- "Blow, Forty-Seven, Blow"
- "Blue Virginia Rose"
- "Bottom Fell Out Of The Sky"
- "Buy Plenty Of Bonds"
- "Cowboy Always Passes On The Left, The Idiot On The Right"
- "Darlin' I've Loved Much Too Much"
- "Don't Cry Little Sweetheart, Don't Cry"
- "Down On The Old Chisca Trail"
- "Dreamy Rio Grande"
- "Driftwood On The River"
- "Ev'rybody Has The Right To Be Screwy In His Own Way"
- "The Falling Star"
- "The Guy Who Stole My Wife"
- "Here She Comes, There She Goes, With Bells On Her Toes"
- "I Can Put My Hand On The Best Man In Town By Patting Myself On The Back"
- "I Got Worries"
- "I Know You'll Wait For Me Little Darling"
- "I'll Be In The Army For A Stretch"
- "I'll Die Before I Tell You"
- "I'm Gonna Be Long Gone When I Go Away"
- "I'm Looking For The Bully Of The Town"
- "I Want To Be Half Shot When I'm Shot"
- "Let's Go Back To The Bible"
- "Little Silver Bells Will Ring Again For China"
- "My Mother's Roses"
- "My Old Canadian Home"
- "New River Train"
- "The Prairie Is My Home"
- "Susie Hopkins"
- "Swaller-Tail Coat"
- "Sweet Baby Come Back Where You Belong"
- "Sweetheart Polka"
- "Tennessee Moon"
- "Them Good Old Times Are Coming Back Again"
- "There's A Heart In The Heart Of The Rockies"
- "There's So Much That I Forgot"
- "They're Positively Wrong"
- "Things That Might Have Been"
- "Tho' My Heart's Broken, I'm Glad It's Over Now"
- "Too Blue To Cry"
- "Too Many Tears"
- The Tops In Cowboy And Hillbilly Pops
- "Troubles In My Heart"
- "Tumblin' On Like A Tumble Weed"
- "Wailee, Sweet Wailee"
- "What Good Is The Sunshine"
- "When A Dog Is Your Friend"
- "Where Are You Now"
- "When You Tore Up My Letters You Tore Up My Heart"
- "Wish You Hadn't Done Me Like You Done"
- "You Gotta Take Off Your Shoes To Sing A Hillbilly Song"

=== 1946 ===
- "Blue Tail Fly"
- "The Cowboy's Dream"
- "Five Lovely Acres Of God's Good Earth"
- "Hang Your Head Low In Shame"
- "I Can Beat You Doin' What You're Doin' To Me"
- "If You Only Knew"
- "I'll Never Love Again Like I Loved You"
- "Not So Long Ago"
- "Stars Walked On The Mountain"
- "You Gotta Take Off Your Shoes"

=== 1947 ===
- "Bite Your Tongue And Say You're Sorry"
- "The Longest Train I Ever Saw"
- "Pal In Palo Alto"
- "Seven Women In One"
- "Wake Up, You Drowsy Sleepers"
- "Welcome Back To My Heart"
- "When A Woman Yells Loud Enough (She Usually Gets What She Wants)"

=== 1948 ===
- "In The Pines" or "The Longest Train I Ever Saw"
- "The Letter I'm Mailing To You"
- "There's Only One Kind Of Red In The Red, White, And Blue"
- "Two Kinds Of People"
- "Uncle Bud"
- "You Can't Do Nothin' With A Woman When She's Determined She Won't Do Somethin'"

=== 1949 ===
- "Jaw, Jaw, Yap, Yap, Yap"
- "Seven Beers With The Wrong Woman"

=== 1950 ===
- "Don't You Angel Me, You Little Devil"
- "Heartless Heart"
- "When You Have No One To Love You"

=== 1951 ===
- "I Don't Want No More Of Army Life, Gee, Mom, I Want To Go Home"
- "The Night Before Christmas In Texas, That Is"
- "You Can't Do Nothin' With A Woman When She Once Makes Up Her Mind"

=== 1952 ===
- "Merry Texas Christmas, You All"

=== 1953 ===
- "I Don't Care What The General Said, I Surrender"
- "Don't Wait Until It's Mother's Day To Remember Your Mother Dear"
- "A Prisoner Of War"
- "Valley Of Memories"
