= Shelby Flint =

American singer (b. 1939)

Shelby Flint (born September 17, 1939) is an American singer-songwriter who had two top-100 hits, "Angel on My Shoulder" in 1961 and "Cast Your Fate to the Wind" in 1966.

== Career ==
Flint's single "I Will Love You" appeared in the Variety T.I.P.S. (Tune Index of Performance and Sales) Top 100 in 1961. She has been a singer in several movies including Breezy ("Breezy's Song"); Snoopy Come Home ("Do You Remember Me?" (Lila's Theme); and Disney's The Rescuers. Among the songs she performed for The Rescuers, "Someone's Waiting for You" was nominated for the Academy Award for Best Original Song in 1977. She later voiced Laine Loraine in Rudolph and Frosty's Christmas in July in 1979.

In an April 1995 interview, Joni Mitchell recalled that when she began making the rounds of the folk open mic circuit, she wanted to sound just like Shelby Flint.

== Personal life ==
Flint was born in North Hollywood, California. She attended public schools in Van Nuys, California, including Valerio Street Elementary, Robert Fulton Junior High School, and Birmingham High School, where she graduated in 1957.

== Singles discography ==
Year	Single (A-side, B-side) Both sides from same album except where indicated	Chart positions		Album
Year	Single (A-side, B-side) Both sides from same album except where indicated	US	US AC	Album
1958	"I Will Love You" b/w "Oh I Miss Him So"	—	—	Non-album tracks
1960	"Angel on My Shoulder" b/w "Somebody" (Non-album track); Issued twice in 1960 with different catalog numbers	22	—	Shelby Flint
1961	"I Will Love You" b/w "Every Night"	—	—	Shelby Flint
1961	"Magic Wand" b/w "A Broken Vow"	—	—	Non-album tracks
1962	"The Riddle Song" b/w "I Love a Wanderer" (Non-album track)	—	—	Shelby Flint
1962	"Ugly Duckling" b/w "The Boy I Love"	—	—	Non-album tracks
1963	"Little Dancing Doll" b/w "It Really Wouldn't Matter"	103	—	Non-album tracks
1964	"Wonderland" b/w "Pipes for Keith"	—	—	Non-album tracks
1964	"I've Grown Accustomed to His Face" b/w "Our Town"	—	—	Cast Your Fate to the Wind
1965	"Angel on My Shoulder" b/w "I Will Love You"	—	—	Cast Your Fate to the Wind
1965	"Joy in the Morning" b/w "Lonely Cinderella"	—	—	Non-album tracks
1966	"Bluebird" b/w "What's New Pussycat" (Non-album track)	—	—	Cast Your Fate to the Wind
1966	"Cast Your Fate to the Wind" b/w "The Lily"	61	11	Cast Your Fate to the Wind
1973	"Breezy's Song"; B-side by Michel Legrand: "Walking on the Beach"	—	—	"Breezy" soundtrack
