= Asteroid City (soundtrack) =

2023 soundtrack album by various artists

Asteroid City (Original Soundtrack)

Soundtrack album by various artists
- Released: June 23, 2023
- Genres: Country; western; American folk; skiffle
- Length: 69:39
- Label: ABKCO
- Producers: Wes Anderson; Randall Poster

Singles from Asteroid City (Original Soundtrack)
- 1. "Dear Alien (Who Art in Heaven)" Released: June 20, 2023

Asteroid City (Original Soundtrack) is the compilation soundtrack album for the 2023 film Asteroid City, by Wes Anderson. It was digitally published by ABKCO Records on June 23, 2023, the same day as the film's theatrical release in the United States.

== Composition ==
Asteroid City takes place in an Arizona desert town in 1955, and its soundtrack contains 17 country and western songs that were originally recorded and released during that time period. Music supervisor Randall Poster stated that "Wes [Anderson] and I had so much fun putting the film's music together... For Asteroid City, we had been 'hunting and gathering' for a year before shooting began."

The soundtrack also includes six original songs by Alexandre Desplat and two original songs by Pulp frontman Jarvis Cocker—both of whom had previously been featured on the soundtrack of Anderson's The French Dispatch—and Richard Hawley.

== Release ==
On June 20, 2023, three days before the soundtrack's release, Cocker released his original song for the film, "Dear Alien (Who Art in Heaven)", which was co-written with Hawley and Anderson. On June 22, Cocker and Hawley performed at an Asteroid City immersive exhibition in London, playing "Dear Alien" and a second song they wrote for the film, "You Can't Wake Up If You Don't Fall Asleep". A special vinyl edition of the soundtrack was made available exclusively at the exhibition, limited to 1,000 copies.

A two-disc vinyl edition of the soundtrack was released on November 24, 2023.

== Accolades ==
Asteroid City (Original Soundtrack) awards and nominations
Award	Year (Note: Indicates the year of ceremony. Each year is linked to the article about the awards held that year, wherever possible.)	Category	Result	Ref.
Hollywood Music in Media Awards	2023	Best Original Score in a Sci-Fi/Fantasy Film	Nominated	

In December 2023, the song "Dear Alien (Who Art in Heaven)" was shortlisted for Best Original Song at the 96th Academy Awards.

== Track listing ==
Asteroid City (Original Soundtrack) track listing
No.	Title	Writer(s)	Performer(s)	Length
1.	"WXYZ-TV Channel 8"	Alexandre Desplat	Alexandre Desplat	2:36
2.	"Last Train to San Fernando"	Sylvester DeVere; Randolph Padmore; Kenneth St. Bernard	Johnny Duncan and the Blue Grass Boys	2:27
3.	"Island of Dreams"	Tom Springfield	The Springfields	2:29
4.	"April in Portugal"	Raul Ferrão; Jose Galhardo; Jimmy Kennedy	Les Baxter	2:43
5.	"Ida Red"	Bob Wills	Bob Wills and His Texas Playboys	2:38
6.	"Pachelbel: Canon and Gigue in D Major – I.Canon"	Johann Pachelbel	Henk Bouman; Musica Antiqua Köln; Reinhard Goebel	3:09
7.	"Opening Ceremony with Awards Presentation (Keynote Speaker: General Grif Gibson)"	Alexandre Desplat	Alexandre Desplat	2:36
8.	"Jingle Jangle Jingle"	Joseph J. Lilley; Frank Loesser	Tex Ritter	2:48
9.	"Orange Blossom Special"	Ervin T. Rouse	Bill Monroe; The Bluegrass Boys	2:33
10.	"High Noon (Do Not Forsake Me)"	Dimitri Tiomkin; Ned Washington	Tex Ritter	3:01
11.	"Cowboy's Lament"	Traditional	Burl Ives	2:38
12.	"Viewing of the Astronomical Ellipses (Opening Comments: Dr. Hickenlooper)"	Alexandre Desplat	Alexandre Desplat	3:48
13.	"Rose Marie"	Rudolf Friml; Herbert Stothart; Otto Harbach; Oscar Hammerstein II	Slim Whitman	2:21
14.	"Indian Love Call – 1944 Version"	Rudolf Friml; Herbert Stothart; Otto Harbach; Oscar Hammerstein II	Slim Whitman	3:08
15.	"Sixteen Tons"	Merle Travis	Tennessee Ernie Ford	2:38
16.	"The Cattle Call"	Tex Owens	Eddy Arnold	2:32
17.	"Special Seminar at the Playwright's Request (Saltzburg Keitel's Classroom)"	Alexandre Desplat	Alexandre Desplat	3:09
18.	"Dear Alien (Who Art in Heaven)"	Jarvis Cocker; Richard Hawley; Wes Anderson	Jarvis Cocker; Jean-Yves Lozac'h; Perè Mallén; Preston Mota; Rupert Friend; Seu Jorge	1:20
19.	"Kaw-Liga"	Hank Williams; Fred Rose	Johnny Duncan and the Blue Grass Boys	2:54
20.	"Emergency Assembly"	Alexandre Desplat	Alexandre Desplat	1:05
21.	"A Bewildering and Bedazzling Celestial Mystery"	Alexandre Desplat	Alexandre Desplat	5:41
22.	"How High the Moon"	Morgan Lewis; Nancy Hamilton	Les Paul and Mary Ford	2:05
23.	"The Streets of Laredo"	Traditional	Bing Crosby	2:52
24.	"Freight Train"	Elizabeth Cotten	The Chas McDevitt Skiffle Group; Nancy Whiskey	2:59
25.	"You Can't Wake Up If You Don't Fall Asleep"	Jarvis Cocker; Richard Hawley	Jarvis Cocker	3:29
Total length:				69:39

Notes

- Initially, both Apple Music and Spotify mistakenly named track 3 as "Indian Love Call". The song that actually plays is "Island of Dreams", as listed in the Focus Features press release.

== Release history ==
Release history and formats for Asteroid City (Original Soundtrack)
Region	Date	Format(s)	Label(s)	Ref.
Various	June 23, 2023	Digital download; streaming	ABKCO Records	
United States	November 24, 2023	Vinyl	ABKCO Records	
