= Bill Bailey Skiffle Group =

The Bill Bailey Skiffle Group were a spasm band and among the earliest British skiffle musicians. The primitive instruments they played included a kazoo and a comb-and-paper mimicking a trumpet.

They made seven appearances on BBC Radio's Saturday Skiffle Club (only Johnny Duncan and Chas McDevitt had more slots on the show) yet no record company ever signed them up.

They lay claim to have been the first British skiffle group because in 1945, Bill Bailey, Freddy Legon and Johnny Jones formed the Original London Blue Blowers. They were featured in jazz broadcasts and as guests in the rhythm clubs that flourished on the fringes of the music scene, mainly playing spasm music and jug music. The combo broke up in 1948 when the two guitar players began playing in various Dixieland bands.

While Freddy Legon was playing guitar and banjo with the Humphrey Lyttelton Band in 1951, he advised a 16-year-old Charles McDevitt on the type of banjo he should take up.

== Personnel ==
- Bill Bailey – guitar, kazoo, vocals
- Dave Coward – bass
- Stan Jayne – guitar, washboard, vocals
- Bill Powell – guitar, banjo
- Freddy Legon – guitar, comb and paper, vocals
- John Beauchamp – drums
