= Oriole Records (UK) =

British record label

- Parent company: Levy Company, then CBS
- Founded: 1925
- Defunct: 1964
- Status: Closed
- Distributors: CBS Records; Sony Music UK (catalogue)
- Country of origin: United Kingdom

Oriole Records was a British record label, founded in 1925 by the London-based Levy Company, which owned a gramophone record subsidiary called Levaphone Records.

== History ==
The Levy family founded a record shop, which also sold bicycles and sewing machines, at 19 High Street, Whitechapel, and which later moved to 139 High Street. Oriole recorded popular music in England, and also issued masters from the United States Vocalion Records in May and June 1927. The original label was discontinued in 1935.

Beginning in 1931, Jacques Levy produced records at the West End studios at Rosslyn House, 94-98 Regent Street, London, where the company stayed until 1937, after which it moved into what was once an art gallery. at 73 New Bond Street, with chief engineers Ted Sibbick and Bill Johnson. In 1949, the company segregated the work and the label. Oriole Records Ltd moved into 104 New Bond Street, London, and Levy moved to a factory at Aston Clinton, near Aylesbury, with Norman Angier and Leslie Gouldstone from MD1, later to be joined by others. From 1938 or 1939, David Morris Levy lived nearby, at Flat 98, Clarence Gate Gardens, near Baker Street, until his death in 1971, and also maintained a residence in Birchington, Kent.

The owner, David Morris Levy, along with his brother Jacques (no relation to his Roulette Records namesake), revived the Oriole label in 1950. Until 1955, it was the exclusive UK licensee for the American Mercury label, with releases by artists including Frankie Laine, Vic Damone and Patti Page. Initially, the releases appeared on the Oriole label, but later on Mercury.

=== First hits ===
Oriole had a few home-made hits in the late 1950s and early 1960s, including the Chas McDevitt Skiffle Group's version of "Freight Train" (featuring Nancy Whiskey on vocals), "Like I Do" by Maureen Evans (based on the same music as Allan Sherman's "Hello Muddah, Hello Fadduh" – Amilcare Ponchielli's Dance of the Hours – and the label's biggest hit), and Russ Hamilton's "We Will Make Love", which reached number 2 in the UK singles chart, and the B-side of which ("Rainbow") reached number 4 in the US Billboard Hot 100 on Kapp Records.

Another success for Oriole was Clinton Ford's 1962 version of the George Formby song, "Fanlight Fanny", which featured accompaniment by the "George Chisholm All Stars". With permission, new words were added, written by Ford. "Fanlight Fanny" was Ford's third UK chart hit and his most successful single, reaching 22 in the UK singles chart in March 1962 and spending ten weeks in the chart.

The label also had successes with tracks licensed from European labels, notably Domenico Modugno's original recording of "Volare" and recordings by the Swedish instrumental group the Spotnicks. In the 1960s, Oriole licensed several recordings produced by Joe Meek, with performances by the Dowlands, Alan Klein and Screaming Lord Sutch. It also distributed several American hits from Columbia Records in the US.

On the long playing(LP) front, Oriole had a big success in 1954 with the original cast recording of the hit West End musical, Salad Days, which broke all box office records.

=== Embassy Records ===
Oriole also produced cover versions of the hits of the day, which it released on its Embassy label, sold exclusively in Woolworths stores. The repertoire consisted of cut-price cover versions of current British pop hits, with the first being released in November 1954. One such recording was a version of "Blue Suede Shoes" by Don Arden (father of Sharon Osbourne), who did his best to impersonate Elvis Presley. Embassy later issued cover performances employing Reg Dwight, later known as Elton John.

=== Tamla Motown on Oriole American ===
During the tenure of A&R manager John Schroeder, Oriole was the first UK label (after the odd release on London and Fontana) to license recordings on a regular basis from the US Tamla and Motown catalogues, but none of the releases charted. It was not until a few years later, and on EMI's Stateside label, that the Detroit-based company would begin its run of hits in the UK. Nonetheless, several of the Oriole singles have since come to be highly regarded, including "Do You Love Me" by the Contours, "You've Really Got a Hold on Me" by the Miracles, and "Fingertips" by Little Stevie Wonder. Oriole released nineteen Motown releases on its black and white Oriole American label, while seven albums appeared on the normal black and yellow Oriole label. The company was known as Tamla Motown outside the US, and they were some of its rarest releases.

=== Takeover by US Columbia ===
The Oriole record company had two record pressing factories, one situated in Aston Clinton and the other in Colnbrook. The company lasted until 21 September 1964, when it was bought by CBS, parent of the American Columbia Records, which was looking to set up its own manufacturing facility in the UK. The result ended the distribution of the CBS label by Philips, and began the phasing out of the Oriole label, which was officially renamed CBS Records in 1965. At first, David Morris Levy stayed on as managing director, but severed all ties with CBS in 1967.

David Morris Levy's sons, John Jacob, a lawyer at Nicholas Morris in London, and Edward Frederick, principal of Chelsea Music Publishing in London, remained active in the music industry.

The Oriole catalogue is now handled by the successor to CBS, Sony Music, which was formed after Japanese conglomerate Sony bought CBS Records in 1988 and renamed it Columbia Records in 1991. Reissues of releases by Oriole are distributed by Columbia Records UK.

== See also ==
- Lists of record labels
