= Mighty Dictator =

Trinidadian calypso singer and musician (1920s – 2002)

Kenneth St. Bernard (c. 1920s – 19 December 2002), known as Dictator or Mighty Dictator, was a Trinidadian calypso singer and musician.

By the late 1940s, St. Bernard was a prominent composer and performer of calypso songs, including "The Female Cricketer" (1948), "The Tobago Girl and the Mirror", "Negroes Keep Together" (both 1949), and "My Trip to Hollywood" (1950). In 1950, the song "Last Train to San Fernando", which he performed and co-wrote, was played in the Trinidad and Tobago Carnival Road March. Later recorded by The Duke of Iron, it became a skiffle hit in Britain when recorded by Johnny Duncan. His later recordings included "Chinese Cricket Match" (1956). Dictator was one of six calypso performers presented to Princess Margaret in 1956.

He died in Trinidad on 19 December 2002.
