= Last Train to San Fernando =

Song by Johnny Duncan
- Released: 1957
- Genre: Skiffle
- Label: Columbia
- Songwriters: Sylvester DeVere; Randolph Padmore; Mighty Dictator

"Last Train to San Fernando" is a Trinidadian calypso song written by Sylvester DeVere, Randolph Padmore, and Mighty Dictator, the latter being a pseudonym for Kenny St. Bernard.

Johnny Duncan, a British-based American musician, recorded a skiffle version (accompanied by the Blue Grass Boys), which was a #2 hit on the UK Singles Chart in 1957. In the U.K., Duncan's recording was released by Columbia Records while in the U.S. it was released as a single by Capitol Records.

Among the other artists who recorded the song were The Duke of Iron in 1952 and Bobby Short in 1957.

== Content ==
In the song, the narrator sings about meeting a woman named Dorothy who is to be married the next day to a member of "high society". Dorothy invites the narrator to take her to dinner, but requires him to be discreet so as not to damage her reputation and cause her wedding to be called off, and wants to be sure to "get back in time" for the last train of the night to San Fernando. In the words of writer Colin Escott, writing for Peter Guralnick's blog, "Ostensibly, [the song] was about trying to get the last train from Port of Spain back to San Fernando, but after hearing the West Indian versions, I came to believe that a woman was offering herself for one last fling before getting married the following day."

Although the song is sometimes said to be about the termination of railway service to San Fernando, Trinidad Government Railway did not actually stop running passenger trains to the city until 1965, long after the song was written and became a hit; the "last train" referred to in the song is the last train of the night, not the last train permanently.

== Charts ==
Chart (1957)	Peak position
UK Singles (OCC)	2

== Reception ==
Among the fans of Duncan's recording were The Quarrymen, a skiffle band whose members included John Lennon, Paul McCartney, and George Harrison, all of whom went to see Duncan perform the song live in Liverpool.

British writer Nik Cohn described Duncan's recording of "Last Train to San Fernando" as his "nomination for the best British record of the fifties", although he also said, "This isn't such a cosmic claim as it sounds. Check the opposition and you'll see that I'm taking no great chances."

Duncan's version of "Last Train to San Fernando" was included on the soundtrack for the 2023 film Asteroid City by Wes Anderson.
