= The Midnight Sky (soundtrack) =

The Midnight Sky (Music from the Netflix Film)

Film score by Alexandre Desplat
- Released: December 11, 2020
- Recorded: July–October 2020
- Studios: Abbey Road Studios, London
- Genre: Film score
- Length: 86:48
- Label: ABKCO
- Producer: Alexandre Desplat

Alexandre Desplat chronology
Little Women (2019)	The Midnight Sky (2020)	The French Dispatch (2021)

The Midnight Sky (Music from the Netflix Film) is the soundtrack to the 2020 film The Midnight Sky directed by George Clooney. Featuring music written by Alexandre Desplat, the album consisted of 26 tracks from the score running for over 90 minutes. Much of the music was written during July and August, and was recorded at the Abbey Road Studios on September, with the London Symphony Orchestra performing the score. Desplat supervised the recording virtually due to the COVID-19 pandemic restrictions.

The score was released on December 11, 2020 by ABKCO Records. The music received generally positive reviews and won a Saturn Award for Best Music, and a Golden Globe nomination for Best Original Score amongst other accolades.

== Development ==
The film is Desplat's fourth collaboration with Clooney as a director, which includes The Ides of March (2011), The Monuments Men (2014) and Suburbicon (2017). In an interview to Jon Burlingame of Variety, Clooney said: "Music is a character in this film because a good portion of it is silent. My intent was for the film to be a meditation. Music had to be our language — not just highlighting moments of sadness or terror, but also to carry the emotion all the way through. Music was always going to be as big a character as any of the actors." Desplat described the film as an "onscreen ballet or concert" as in the film, "the characters don't talk much; the visuals are leading the story. Music conveys the emotions of all the characters: Augustine [Clooney], who is very ill; the little girl [Caoilinn Springall], who doesn't speak; the crew in the spaceship". The motive is to "to carry the emotion of the characters, and both the intimacy and the wide scope of the story" which was quite challenging. Desplat wanted to something "gentle and contemplative but also being a "tragedy about death" referring to the end of earth which was "more internal, about regret and suffering and the future of mankind, but seen through the eyes of real people".

Desplat developed two main themes, with a delicate piano sequence, that links the girl with Augustine, and another prominent theme representing "survival and hope". Initially, for the space sequences, Clooney did not plan for a specific theme music but backtracked the decision as it "seemed so bare". For the astronauts' first spacewalk, Clooney demanded "very quiet, very slow strings play" in a suspended and motionless way, as it "creates a kind of silence without being silent". He felt the biggest challenge was to balance the human aspects with the constant sense of danger, both in earth and space where "there is a warmth between the characters, solidarity and friendship and benevolence. At the same time, you feel that nothing is safe. That balance was tricky to find."

The score was written during July and August 2020, where Clooney and Desplat communicated through Zoom and Skype. Due to the COVID-19 pandemic, Desplat had to record the sessions separately, which twists for the musicians to the perception of the "overall orchestral sound, dynamics, intonation, phrasing music" making it frustrating to the director. However, to adapt with the restrictions of the quarantine, he layered strings, piano, brass and woodwinds with a 50-piece string section from the London Symphony Orchestra recorded the score at Abbey Road Studios, London in early-September. Since Desplat was in Paris, he could not supervise the recording in person, but organised the same through his Paris studio giving notes to conductor Gavin Greenaway and the musicians during the sessions. His wife Dominique Lemmmonier, did not conduct the orchestra as she was in Paris with Desplat, due to COVID-19 pandemic restrictions. Explaining the recording process, Desplat said "it is the most exciting moment for me when the music I have dreamed of for weeks finally, finally comes to life in the same room with the musicians as it unveils, finally flying in the air from the parts they are sight-reading". Desplat wrote 90 minutes of music for the film, which was more than the actual music he had written for previous films.

== Track listing ==
No.	Title	Length
1.	"The Midnight Sky"	3:31
2.	"Aether Spaceship"	3:33
3.	"Mission"	4:24
4.	"Sullivan's Nightmare"	2:09
5.	"Iris In The Stars"	4:32
6.	"Augustine's Redemption"	2:54
7.	"Evacuation"	2:48
8.	"Wolves Attack"	2:06
9.	"Families & Friends"	2:32
10.	"In The Milky Way"	2:55
11.	"A Child"	1:57
12.	"Peas Battle"	3:22
13.	"First Alert"	3:54
14.	"Dead Birds"	1:10
15.	"Crashed Plane"	5:22
16.	"The Ice Breaks"	3:09
17.	"Visual On Earth"	3:00
18.	"Survivors"	3:11
19.	"Is There Hope?"	7:43
20.	"Changing Route"	3:55
21.	"Asteroids Rain"	2:08
22.	"Blood Drops"	5:33
23.	"Mourning"	4:00
24.	"There Is Nowhere"	2:13
25.	"A Ride Home"	1:44
26.	"A New Life Ahead"	3:03
Total length:		86:48

== Reception ==
=== Critical response ===
Simran Hans of The Guardian complimented that Desplat's score "sets a tone of wonder, optimism, and cosmic significance" comparing his score for Terrence Malick's The Tree of Life (2011). David Rooney of The Hollywood Reporter wrote "if Alexandre Desplat's rich orchestral score often leans too hard on the heart-tugging sentiment, its surging power in dramatic moments is undeniable." Brian Tallerico of RogerEbert.com commented Desplat's score as "aggressive". Music critic Jonathan Broxton wrote "The Midnight Sky is not a happy film, and therefore it is not a happy score. There are times here where Alexandre Desplat is scoring from the bleakest possible place, combining orchestral and electronic textures in a way that is beautiful, but tinged with bitterness, regret, and no small part of desperation. There are moments of cold and stark alienation, fear-based action, and eventually tragedy. But there is just something about the contemplative nature of the score, and the way it seeks to overcome all the obstacles, that is enormously appealing."

Anton Smit of Soundtrack World wrote "While this album contains some parts that are not pleasant to listen to, there are also other parts that are very enjoyable, especially when the two themes really stand out." James Southall of Movie Wave wrote "Parts – large parts – of The Midnight Sky are prime Desplat, and therefore amongst the film music highlights of the year, especially the more ethereal sections, which are generally superb. Were the album trimmed down by half an hour I'd probably give it my highest recommendation, but parts of it are less interesting and so as a packaged listening experience it is more up-and-down than it needs to be."

Richard Lawson of Vanity Fair felt that Desplat's score sounds like a "children's fable" or even resembling Alan Silvestri's main theme from Contact (1997). Owen Gleiberman of Variety wrote "Alexandre Desplat's score blankets the action in a mournful grandeur." Don Kaye of Den of Geek commented the score as "lovely but occasionally overbearing", while Polygon's Robert Daniels also admitted the score to be overbearing.

=== Accolades ===
Award	Date of ceremony	Category	Recipient(s)	Result	Ref.
Hollywood Music in Media Awards	January 27, 2021	Best Original Score in a Feature Film	Alexandre Desplat	Nominated	
Satellite Awards	February 15, 2021	Best Original Score	Alexandre Desplat	Won	
Golden Globe Awards	February 28, 2021	Best Original Score	Alexandre Desplat	Nominated	
Hollywood Critics Association Awards	March 5, 2021	Best Score	Alexandre Desplat	Nominated	
Critics' Choice Movie Awards	March 7, 2021	Best Score	Alexandre Desplat	Nominated	
Motion Picture Sound Editors Awards	April 16, 2021	Outstanding Achievement in Sound Editing – Feature Underscore	Michael Alexander and Peter Clarke	Nominated	
