= Nancy Whiskey =

Scottish folk singer (1935–2003)

- Also known as: Nancy Wilson
- Born: Anne Alexandra Young Wilson; 4 March 1935; Glasgow, Scotland
- Died: 1 February 2003 (aged 67) Leicester, England
- Genres: Folk, skiffle
- Occupation: Singer
- Instrument: Vocals
- Years active: c.1954–1999
- Labels: Topic, Oriole

Nancy Whiskey (born Anne Alexandra Young Wilson; 4 March 1935 – 1 February 2003) was a Scottish folk singer, best known for the 1957 hit song "Freight Train".

== Life and career ==
Nancy Wilson was born in Dalmarnock, Glasgow, Scotland, and learned guitar as a child. While attending art school in Glasgow, she performed on the local folk club circuit where she met fellow singer and guitarist Jimmie Macgregor who introduced her to blues and hillbilly music. She took her stage name from a Scottish folk song, "The Calton Weaver", which has a chorus of: "Whisky, whisky, Nancy whisky, Whisky, whisky, Nancy-O".

She formed a relationship with jazz pianist Bob Kelly, and they moved to London in 1955. On MacGregor's recommendation, she was signed by Topic Records and, although reluctant to surrender her reputation as a solo performer, was persuaded to join the Chas McDevitt Skiffle Group to record Elizabeth Cotten's song "Freight Train". The group had already recorded the song, with McDevitt singing, but re-recorded it with Nancy Whiskey's vocals. The record made the top five in the UK Singles Chart in 1957, and she also toured the United States with McDevitt's group and appeared on the Ed Sullivan Show. "Freight Train" sold over one million copies, and was awarded a gold record award. A dispute over the rights to the song, which had been introduced to Britain by Peggy Seeger, was eventually settled out of court.

After a second, smaller hit, "Greenback Dollar", Whiskey left the group. She disliked the skiffle style which she was obliged to perform with McDevitt, and her outspoken comments, together with the fact that she was expecting a child with Bob Kelly, a married man, offended some fans. She resumed a solo career and — after his divorce — married Kelly, who became a member of her backing group, the Skifflers, who later renamed themselves as the Teetotallers. She also recorded several singles for Oriole Records in the late 1950s, and released an album, The Intoxicating Miss Whiskey.

She and Kelly moved to Melton Mowbray, Leicestershire, around 1958 after the birth of their daughter (named Yancey Anne in tribute to pianist Jimmy Yancey). Although by the 1970s she had largely retired from the mainstream music industry, she continued to perform occasionally in folk clubs, and at other events such as a 1997 gala concert at the Royal Albert Hall billed as "The Roots Of British Rock".

Bob Kelly died in 1999, and she died in 2003 in Leicester, aged 67.

The song "Freight Train", sung by Nancy Whiskey with the Chas McDevitt Skiffle Group, appears in full in the Bermondsey Town Hall concert sequence at the end of the 1957 film The Tommy Steele Story. Also, in 2023, "Freight Train", sung by Whiskey, was featured in Wes Anderson's film Asteroid City.

== Discography ==
- Nancy Whiskey Sings (1957, Topic 7T10)
- The Intoxicating Miss Whiskey
