= Folksongs and Instrumentals with Guitar =

Studio album by Elizabeth Cotten
- Released: 1958
- Recorded: 1957–1958
- Studio: Washington, D.C., US
- Genre: Folk; blues; country blues
- Length: 34:53
- Label: Folkways

Professional ratings
Review scores
Source	Rating
AllMusic	5/5 stars
The Penguin Guide to Blues Recordings	3/4 stars

Folksongs and Instrumentals with Guitar is a 1958 album by American blues and folk musician Elizabeth Cotten and was released on Folkways Records as FG 3526. In 1989 it was reissued by Smithsonian Folkways as SFW40009 featuring Mike Seeger's updated notes with comments on Cotten's life, musical style, and song lyrics. The album is also known as Freight Train and Other North Carolina Folk Songs and Tunes and was originally released as Elizabeth Cotten: Negro Folk Songs and Tunes. It is best known for containing the earliest recording of her classic "Freight Train." The album cover was designed by Ronald Clyne.

In 2008, the Library of Congress named the album to its National Recording Registry as "culturally, historically, or aesthetically significant".

== Track listing ==
Side One
No.	Title	Length
1.	"Wilson Rag"	1:40
2.	"Freight Train"	2:46
3.	"Going Down the Road Feeling Bad"	2:12
4.	"I Don't Love Nobody"	1:14
5.	"Ain't Got No Honey Baby Now"	0:57
6.	"Graduation March"	2:33
7.	"Honey Babe Your Papa Cares for You"	2:15
8.	"Vastopol"	2:11

Side Two
No.	Title	Length
9.	"Here Old Rattler Here / Sent for My Fiddle Sent For My Bow / George Buck"	3:48
10.	"Run......Run / Mama Your Son Done Gone"	2:19
11.	"Sweet Bye and Bye / What a Friend We Have in Jesus"	3:02
12.	"Oh Babe It Ain't No Lie"	4:43
13.	"Spanish Flang Dang"	2:51
14.	"When I Get Home"	2:23
Total length:		34:53
