= The Secret Life of Pets 2 (soundtrack) =

The Secret Life of Pets 2 (Original Motion Picture Soundtrack)

Soundtrack album by Alexandre Desplat
- Released: May 31, 2019
- Recorded: 2019
- Genres: Jazz; classical
- Length: 1:04:24
- Label: Back Lot Music
- Producer: Alexandre Desplat

Alexandre Desplat chronology
Kursk (2019)	The Secret Life of Pets 2 (Original Motion Picture Soundtrack) (2019)	Little Women (2019)

The Secret Life of Pets 2 (Original Motion Picture Soundtrack) is the soundtrack album to the 2019 film of the same name, which is the sequel to The Secret Life of Pets (2016). The film's music is composed by Alexandre Desplat and the score album, featuring 22 tracks of the score, alongside three incorporated songs were released by Back Lot Music on May 31, 2019, a week ahead of the film's release. Like the first film, the score for the sequel, uses jazz and orchestral music.

== Background ==
Alexandre Desplat was hired for the sequel in August 2018. Director Chris Renaud spoke about the film's music, saying "From a scoring point of view, it was a very interesting challenge compared to the first film. In the first film, we were really talking about a jazz-infused, big band, New York, Mancini themed score." The second film had several themes, including haunted house, circus scene, countryside and superhero themes, Renaud felt the score as the biggest challenging and went on to say that "There's a lot of different ideas that had to come together musically, but again, not leave the movie or the score feeling disjointed."

In addition to the score, the album features two cover songs from the 1970s, as well a hip hop song: Bill Withers' "Lovely Day", performed by LunchMoney Lewis featuring Aminé, Paul Simon's "Me and Julio Down by the Schoolyard" produced and performed by Jack Antonoff, and Desiigner's "Panda", performed by Kevin Hart. Critic Mark Kennedy opined that the song is a callback to the "original song's appearance in the first film".

Kaela Kimura supplies the theme song for the Japanese release, titled "BREAKER," which is centred around the theme of "breaking out of your shell to try new things."

== Reception ==
Filmtracks.com wrote "There is absolutely no narrative flow to any of these ideas when presented apart from the film. Not even the minor motifs for several of the specific characters, while mostly tied to instrumental flair, carries over clearly. The whole thing is overflowing with consistent antics but lacks one overarching personality with which to leave a lasting impression. Perhaps the caper tones will serve in that capacity for some listeners, but these passages occupy only a fraction of the score. In the end, The Secret Life of Pets 2 is a breezy and proficient effort from Desplat, but approach it with patience and lowered expectations." The Hollywood Reporter's Michael Rechtshaffen praised Desplat's "jazz-inflected orchestrations" that pays "homage to Scott Bradley’s Tom and Jerry scores from the ’40s and ’50s" and called it as "undeniably melodic". Jake Wilson of The Sydney Morning Herald wrote "The tone sought is one of faintly retro sophistication, signalled by the jazzy music of Alexandre Desplat and by a visual style which deploys the kind of “civilised” exaggeration found in New Yorker cartoons." Mark Kennedy, writing for The Philadelphia Tribune and Chicago Sun-Times called the soundtrack as "lively".

== Track listing ==
All music is composed by Alexandre Desplat, except where noted.

No.	Title	Music	Length
1.	"It's Gonna Be a Lovely Day (The Secret Life of Pets 2)"	LunchMoney Lewis featuring Aminé	3:51
2.	"Me and Julio Down by the Schoolyard"	Jack Antonoff	2:47
3.	"It's Snowtime, Baby!"		2:19
4.	"Max's Busy Bee"		3:38
5.	"Children's Heroes"		2:15
6.	"Road Trip"		1:05
7.	"Gidget's Dream"		2:29
8.	"Snowball's Workout"		1:50
9.	"Daisy's Story – Meet Sergei"		2:12
10.	"The Farm"		2:01
11.	"Fireflies"		0:49
12.	"Cat Lessons"		2:22
13.	"Keeping Liam Safe"		1:07
14.	"Max's Terrors"		2:23
15.	"Sergei's Circus"		4:06
16.	"Gidget's Mission"		2:22
17.	"Snowball's Swirl"		1:37
18.	"Sergei"		2:58
19.	"Herding"		7:05
20.	"Wolves & Daisy"		1:45
21.	"Max Finds His Howl"		0:51
22.	"Inner Rooster"		4:27
23.	"Goodbye Farm"		0:52
24.	"Train Chase"		7:21
25.	"Panda"	Kevin Hart	0:44

== Additional music ==
Film music not included in the album:

- "Empire State of Mind" – Jay-Z featuring Alicia Keys
- "I Was Made to Love Her" – Stevie Wonder
- "Superman Theme" – John Williams
- "Garota de Ipanema" – Antonio Carlos Jobim, Vinicius de Moraes
- "Foggy Mountain Breakdown" – The Billy Bob Banjo Band
- "White Rabbit" – Jefferson Airplane
- "Fantastic Voyage" – Coolio
- "La Marseillaise" – Claude Joseph Rouget de Lisle
- "La Grange" – ZZ Top
- "Ante Up (Robin Hoodz Theory)" – M.O.P.

== Personnel ==
Credits adapted from CD liner notes:

Orchestra

- Orchestra contractor – Peter Rotter
- Vocal contractor – Jasper Randall
- Concertmistress – Belinda Broughton

Vocalists

- Alto Vocals – Callista Hoffman-Campbell, Eleni Pantages, Jessica Rotter, Jessie Shulman, Karen Schwartz, Kimberly Switzer, Laura Smith Roethe, Lesley Leighton, Niké St. Clair, Sara Mann
- Bass Vocals – Ben Han-Wei Lin, Chung Uk Lee, Dylan Gentile, Eric Bradley, Jim Campbell, Mark Edward Smith, Michael Bannett, Scott Graff, Tim Campbell, William Kenneth Goldman
- Soprano Vocals – Andrea Zomorodian, Anna Schubert, Beth Peregrine, Claire Fedoruk, Elissa Johnston, Karen Hogle Brown, Kelci Hahn, Laura Dickinson, Lika Miyake, Suzanne Waters
- Tenor Vocals – Chris Mann, Gerald White, Jon Lee Keenan, JJ Lopez, Joshua D. McGowan, Matt Brown, Matthew Tresler, Michael Lichtenauer, Todd S. Honeycutt, Todd Strange

Instruments

- Bassoon – Kenneth Munday, William May, Rose Corrigan
- Cello – Armen Ksajikian, Cecilia Tsan, Dennis Karmazyn, Eric Byers, Evgeny Tonkha, Jacob Braun, Ross Gasworth, Timothy Landauer, Timothy Loo, Vanessa Freebairn-Smith, Andrew Shulman
- Clarinet – Dan Higgins, Ralph Williams, Stuart Clark
- Contrabass – Christian Kollgaard, David Stone, David Parmeter, Drew Dembowski, Edward Meares, Geoffrey Osika, Kenneth Wild, Nicolas Philippon, Oscar Hidalgo, Stephen Dress, Thomas Harte, Michael Valerio
- Drums – Peter Erskine
- Flute – Ben Smolen, Heather Clark, Jennifer Olson, Julie Burkert, Geri Rotella
- Guitar – George Doering, Andrew Synowiec
- Harp – Marcia Dickstein, Katie Kirkpatrick
- Horn – Amy Rhine, Benjamin Jaber, Daniel Kelley, Dylan Hart, Jaclyn Rainey, Katelyn Faraudo, Kaylet Torrez, Laura Brenes, Mike McCoy, Steven Becknell, Teag Reaves, David Everson
- Oboe – Chris Bleth, Lelie Resnick, Sarah Beck, Lara Wickes
- Percussion – Alex Necioscup-Acuna, Brian Kilgore, Donald Williams, Edward Atkatz, Kenneth McGrath, Luis Conte, Paulinho Da Costa, Steven Schaeffer, Wade Culbreath
- Piano – Christian Jacob, Tom Ranier, Gloria Cheng
- Saxophone – Brian Scanlon, Chad Smith, Dan Higgins, Greg Huckins, Jeff Driskill, Salvadore Lozano
- Trombone – Alexander Iles, Andrew Martin, William Reichenbach, Phillip Keen, Ryan Dragon
- Trumpet – Barry Perkins, Daniel Fornero, Daniel Rosenboom, Mike Rocha, Robert Schaer, Thomas Hooten, Wayne Bergeron, Jon Lewis
- Tuba – Doug Tornquist
- Viola – Alma Fernandez, Andrew Duckles, Carolyn Riley, Zach Dellinger, Jonathan Moerschel, Luke Maurer, Matthew Funes, Meredith Crawford, Michael Larco, Mike Whitson, Shawn Mann, Robert Brophy
- Violin – Alyssa Park, Amy Hershberger, Benjamin Jacobson, Bruce Dukov, Charlie Bisharat, Darius Campo, Dimitrie Leivici, Eun-Mee Ahn, Grace Oh, Helen Nightengale, Henry Gronnier, Irina Voloshina, Jacqueline Brand, Jessica Guideri, Kevin Connolly, Kevin Kumar, Lisa Liu, Luanne Homzy, Lucia Micarelli, Maya Magub, Natalie Leggett, Nathan Cole, Phillip Levy, Rafael Rishik, Roberto Cani, Sara Parkins, Sarah Thornblade, Shalini Vijayan, Songa Lee, Tamara Hatwan, Tereza Stanislav, Julie Gigante
