= Little Women (soundtrack) =

Little Women: Original Motion Picture Soundtrack

Film score by Alexandre Desplat
- Released: December 13, 2019
- Recorded: 2019
- Studios: Sony Scoring Stage (Hollywood, California)
- Genres: Film score; ambient; orchestral; atmospheric; light music; instrumental
- Length: 63:42
- Label: Sony Music
- Producer: Alexandre Desplat

Alexandre Desplat chronology
The Secret Life of Pets 2 (2019)	Little Women (2019)	The Midnight Sky (2020)

Little Women: Original Motion Picture Soundtrack is the score album composed and conducted by Alexandre Desplat for the 2019 American film Little Women at The DiMenna Center for Classical Music in New York City. A seventh film adaptation of the 1868 novel of the same name by Louisa May Alcott, the film is directed by Greta Gerwig, and stars an ensemble cast consisting of Saoirse Ronan, Emma Watson, Florence Pugh, Eliza Scanlen, Laura Dern, Timothée Chalamet, Meryl Streep, Tracy Letts, Bob Odenkirk, James Norton, Louis Garrel, and Chris Cooper. The original score album was released by Sony Music on December 13, 2019.

Desplat had restrained orchestration for the film with two pianos and limited musicians, except for one of the cues, which demanded a wide range of instruments. He called the score as a combination of Wolfgang Amadeus Mozart and David Bowie's works, as a wide range of emotions being pictured in the film and its characters. The score received positive critical response, praising the composition and thematic setting to the film's characters. It received several awards and nominations at various ceremonies.

== Background ==
French composer Alexandre Desplat composed the score. Gerwig had admired Desplat's score for the film Birth (2004) and aspired to work with him; she enlisted him for the "beautiful but not saccharine" and "exacting" qualities of his music for the film.

For one of the cues, Desplat employed a 40-piece orchestra that included a piano, string, harp, flute, clarinet, vibraphone and celesta. The first theme, he wrote for the film was for the scene where "Josephine March (Saoirse Ronan) exhilaratingly walking through New York City", which set the tone for the film in its entirety. He thought of using a string quartlet for the song, but later decided to use a string orchestra, to convey the emotions in whole. He further said in an interview that Gerwig specified that she would like the music to be "a mix of Mozart meeting Bowie".

"I think energy, pulse, melodies, joy and rhythm because Mozart has a lot of rhythm. And Bowie, of course, there's something pop about the art direction of this film. The way they dance — they don't dance like they would be in a period movie with every moment tailored like it's 1867. [Gerwig] took the challenge of making them dance differently and have fun and be excited like kids nowadays would dance if they were 15 or 13. There's a youth about Mozart, because we know Mozart was a child all his life, and for Bowie, there's something extravagant about him that we see in their characters — they want to be different, they all want to be artists."

— Desplat, in an interview with Billboard about "the Mozart and Bowie's combination" for Little Women's score.

Desplat worked on several cues for the film which Gerwig had liked. He further recalled, "When I saw the movie, the music felt almost wall to wall. It was like watching a ballet with beautiful people in beautiful places, discovering life, keeping their innocence and at the same time losing it." For a death of Elizabeth March, Desplat used a harp to produce the theme as it was "very resonant". In a scene, where March family's matriarch, Marmee (Laura Dern), moves to Washington, D.C., Desplat produced an upbeat score that grows more somber, reflecting the mood of the film. He stated "The emotions are all piled up. It's sadness, joy, desire of love, hope. It's always in layers and the music had to capture that."

The first theme from the score, which is the title of the film, was released on November 19, 2019. Two more themes "Plumfield" and "It's Romance" was later released on November 22 and December 2. A preview of the film's track list was released on December 6, and the score album was released on December 13 in digital and physical formats. A 2-disc vinyl edition of the score was released on February 28, 2020.

== Track listing ==
Track listing adapted from Tidal.

No.	Title	Length
1.	"Little Women"	3:12
2.	"Plumfield"	3:38
3.	"The Beach"	2:48
4.	"Christmas Morning"	2:53
5.	"Dance on the Porch"	1:07
6.	"Ice Skating"	2:13
7.	"The Book"	3:36
8.	"Father Comes Home"	3:18
9.	"Christmas Breakfast"	2:33
10.	"Amy"	1:25
11.	"Friedrich Dances with Jo"	1:34
12.	"Telegram"	1:49
13.	"Theatre in the Attic"	2:27
14.	"Laurie Kisses Amy"	1:23
15.	"Friedrich"	1:32
16.	"Laurie and Jo on the Hill"	1:01
17.	"Young Love"	1:34
18.	"Meg's Dress"	4:26
19.	"Carriage Ride"	1:48
20.	"Laurie"	0:55
21.	"The Letter"	1:45
22.	"Snow in the Garden"	2:39
23.	"Jo Writes"	3:49
24.	"Amy, Fred, Meg & John"	3:48
25.	"Dr March's Daughters"	4:46
26.	"It's Romance"	1:23
Total length:		63:42

== Critical reception ==
The score received critical acclaim. Critic Jim Paterson of Mfiles said "Desplat's score is wholesome and speaks from the heart with an innocent simplicity. Although the tone is fairly consistent throughout, achieved mostly by his orchestral palette, Desplat rarely repeats himself and instead provides a constant source of invention within that tonal range." Jonathan Broxton further claimed "Desplat's music is everything one would expect it to be; it overflows with gorgeous orchestrations, sublime instrumental combinations and harmonies, a dramatic sense of freedom and movement, effortless elegance, and lush emotional content. It works like gangbusters in the film, allowing what could otherwise have been a somewhat staid and stuffy adaptation of a 150-year-old novel to take flight as a passionate, exciting story of romance and female empowerment. The thematic content is perhaps a little on the subtle side, and may not immediately become apparent to those who need more overt and memorable melodic writing in order to connect with a score, but, this is a minor quibble which in no way detracts from the overall excellence of the piece."

Caroline Godard of Cherwell wrote "Any great film score must fulfill a paradox. It needs to be a standalone achievement, existing independently of the story it illustrates, while also blending seamlessly into the background of that story itself. Desplat's film score does exactly this. The score's staccato notes accentuate the plot, from Jo's bookish ambitions to Beth's frail health, and yet the music is also a character in itself: both descriptive and worth describing. This is what makes Desplat's Little Women a standout accomplishment, entirely deserving of its recent Academy Award nomination." Ellen Johnson of Paste called Desplat's compositions as "delightful as the film itself".

== Analysis ==
The Rabbit Room-based editor Drew Miller, analysed the music of the film which was not only "emotional" but how it "unfolds in the medium of time itself". He said "Formative moments from childhood, adolescence, and adulthood in all four sister's lives, before there was even a whisper of music, were ordered in such a way as to bring out the depth of emotion that lurked just under the surface. Rather than carry that emotional load all by itself, the film score was freed up to play within this form." Miller cited two scenes as an example and clarified the difference between the instrumentation and tonality on the score, and also with the composition, saying "In the first segment, the melody is played in the key of G major. For the second segment, the piano jumps up a fourth to the key of C major. The effect is one of holding one's breath. The piano's voicing changes from a warm, loose sound to a cold and taut one. And while the piano seems to suck in breath as a result of the key change, the bass conversely jumps down by a fifth to reach a very low C. If the piano weeps in the high register of a whimper, the bass sobs in the low register of a groan [...] This is where it gets mysterious. When art of any kind reaches this level of synchronicity, where all the parts work seamlessly together, it can become difficult to determine why it has the effect it does on us. And in some ways, the why isn't even the point—the very difficulty in answering the question can be a clue for us to settle in and feel it before trying to explain it."

Ellen Johnson further recalled that, "The music in this film needed to have a certain movement—Little Women's protagonist Jo is rarely still—and Desplat's arrangements are positively kinetic". She recalled the composition of the opening theme, claiming that "It's thoroughly bright, a perfect introduction to a movie that will explore both youth and young adulthood at great lengths". She concluded "Little Women is not a musical, but it is lyrical in tone. Much like in Gerwig's 2017 film Lady Bird, this movie has a very obvious rhythm to it, and so much of that movement is owed to Desplat's genius music." Caroline Godard stated "Desplat's work is well-paced, balanced, and metronomic. It is equally reliant upon the strings, keyboard, and wind instruments, and the songs drip into one another, causing the entire work to attain a sort of hypnotic sameness. Despite this, each song manages to illustrate an individual thought or emotion that corresponds to a given point in the film."

== Accolades ==
Among its numerous awards and wins, the score was nominated for Academy Award, Golden Globe Award and BAFTA Award for Best Original Score for Desplat. Both awards were, however, lost to Hildur Guðnadóttir for her compositions in Joker. At the International Film Music Critics Association, Desplat won the award for Best Original Score for a Drama film and received a nomination for Film Score of the Year. He further won few awards at the Chicago Film Critics Association and Boston Society of Film Critics.
