= Freight Train (folk song) =

Early 20th-century song by Elizabeth Cotten

Song by Elizabeth Cotten
- Written: between 1906 and 1912
- Composer: Elizabeth Cotten

"Freight Train" is an American folk song written by Elizabeth Cotten in the early 20th century, and popularized during the American folk revival and British skiffle period of the 1950s and 1960s. By Cotten's own account in the 1985 BBC series Down Home, she composed "Freight Train" as a teenager (sometime between 1906 and 1912), inspired by the sound of the trains rolling in on the tracks near her home in North Carolina.

Cotten was a one-time nanny for folk singer Peggy Seeger, who took this song with her to England, where it became popular in folk music circles. Pseudonymous British songwriters "Paul James" and "Fred Williams" from a British skiffle band subsequently misappropriated it as their own composition and registered a claim of copyright in the song, adding a murderer-on-the-run storyline. Under that credit, it was recorded by British skiffle singer Chas McDevitt, in December, 1956. Under advice from his manager (Bill Varley), McDevitt then brought in folk-singer Nancy Whiskey and re-recorded the song with her doing the vocal; the result was a chart hit. McDevitt's version influenced many young skiffle groups of the day, including The Quarrymen. Under the advocacy of the influential Seeger family, the copyright was eventually restored to Cotten. Nevertheless, it remains mis-credited in many sources.

The Elizabeth Cotten recording for the Folksongs and Instrumentals with Guitar album was made by Mike Seeger in late 1957, early 1958, at Cotten's home in Washington, D.C.

== Beatles cover versions ==
According to author Mark Lewisohn, in The Complete Beatles Chronicles (p. 362), the young Quarrymen-Beatles performed it live from 1957 till at least 1959, if not later, with John Lennon on lead vocal. No recorded version is known to survive. However, in January 1991, while doing recorded rehearsals in Sussex, England for the initial Unplugged TV show, Paul McCartney and his band performed various classic skiffle songs. The concluding number was "Freight Train", though it was abruptly stopped just a few seconds into the song. (This recording is available on an unauthorized release called Paul McCartney Limelight.) In 2009, Quarrymen member Rod Davis recorded the song and released it on his album Under The Influence.

== Notable cover versions ==
Many artists have since recorded their own version of the song. Among the most prominent are:

- Rusty Draper (charted to the US top ten, end of 1957; #9 in Canada)
- Ramblin' Jack Elliott on the album The Lost Topic Tapes: Cowes Harbour 1957.
- Chas McDevitt Skiffle Group featuring Nancy Whiskey (No. 5 on the UK Singles Chart in 1957). It was performed in the 1957 film The Tommy Steele Story or Rock Around The World and included on the soundtrack of the 2023 film Asteroid City by Wes Anderson.
- Jim and Jesse McReynolds on a 1971 single
- Esther and Abi Ofarim on the 1963 album Esther Ofarim and Abraham
- Esther Ofarim released a version titled "Le Train" on the 1965 album Esther Ofarim

== See also ==
- List of train songs
