= The French Dispatch (soundtrack) =

2021 soundtrack album by Alexandre Desplat

The music to the 2021 anthology comedy drama film The French Dispatch directed by Wes Anderson features of a score composed by Alexandre Desplat, and selections of French classical and pop hits curated by the music supervisor Randall Poster, who were Anderson's regular collaborators. The score was recorded during the COVID-19 pandemic, featured contributions from pianist Jean-Yves Thibaudet, collaborated with Desplat on wide range of instruments and orchestra recorded at Abbey Road Studios. The score album, The French Dispatch: Original Score released on May 21, 2021, five months ahead of the film's release, and the soundtrack, The French Dispatch: Original Soundtrack was released along with the film, on October 22, 2021, which preceded with the lead single "Obituary" from Desplat's score, released on September 14. Both albums were distributed by ABKCO Records. Desplat received a BAFTA Award for Best Original Music nomination and a Golden Globe Award for Best Original Score nomination.

== Development ==
Even before the production began, Anderson sent the film's script to Desplat and Poster to design the sonic palette. Desplat recalled it as:

"When I read the script I always try to find what is behind the virtuality of words, the virtuality of the camera moves, and production design and costumes. There's humor, a lot of humor, there's a great craft, but the stories are very deep. But this depth is always a bit blurred and out of focus. Because maybe he [Anderson] wants to protect his emotions. He doesn't show them too much. But all the subjects he shows in his films are very deep and moving. He shows it through poetry, a lot of poetry, and 'Dispatch' has a lot of that."

Desplat, while writing music, would play his sketches to Anderson where he would give the notes and thereby he would explore and elaborate those ideas, repeating the process back and forth until they found a direction that felt right for the film. Since the film was further set in France, he also had an advantage of being a hometown-based as well as his history related to scoring several French films. Desplat also admitted that "What is beautiful in this film is that it's a real homage to Wes from French culture. We know he's living part-time in Paris. But for true love of French culture: literature, music, cuisine — he likes French cuisine. The movie shows that too." He further drew inspiration from French composers Erik Satie and Thelonious Monk.

Desplat scored the opening sequence and two of the episodes in the film: "The Concrete Masterpiece" and "The Private Dining Room of the Police Commissioner". On scoring the film, he explained it as "a handful of people at a newspaper in the past, a little place, like a postcard from the 1960s" which demonstrated that the score should not be lush and huge, but instead sparse and clear. To achieve this, he collaborated with pianist Jean-Yves Thibaudet whom previously worked on Extremely Loud & Incredibly Close (2011) to perform solo piano for the film. They would later collaborate on unusual duets of the score, that had an offbeat collection of instruments such as harpischord, banjo, tuba, timpani, bassoon among varied instruments. Due to the COVID-19 pandemic, Desplat would record his parts with Thibaudet on Los Angeles, while the orchestra performed the score at Abbey Road Studios in London.

As for the songs featured in the film, Poster felt that they were focusing on French music, using Charles Aznavour ballad "J'en déduis que je t'aime" and remake of the French hit "Aline" (1965) performed by Jarvis Cocker (who was cast as Tip-Top), played in the episode "Revisions to a Manifesto". Poster and Anderson admired the original song over the years, and while recording the cover, he described it as a "fun" process. He felt the song was so "distinctive" where in other countries, the presence of this song was rare, while in France, "it was almost like a national anthem" due to Christophe's contribution.

Cocker felt it to "be kind of sincere love letter to French pop music and did not want it to be in any way kind of a pastiche-type thing. And that also meant that I had to work on my French pronunciation and stuff like that. So that to a French person listening to it, they wouldn't listen and think, 'Oh, that's disrespectful' or 'That just doesn't make sense'." Though he had a profound background in France, his spoken French was considered "pretty atrocious". Hence, he undertook vocal coaching from Stereolab frontman Lætitia Sadier to understand the pronunciation of the language; in addition to this, Sadier performed a duet on "Paroles, paroles" and translated Nino Ferrer's English song "Looking for You" into a French version titled "Amour, Je Te Cherche".

== Track listing ==
=== The French Dispatch: Original Score ===
The French Dispatch: Original Score

Soundtrack album by Alexandre Desplat
- Released: May 21, 2021
- Recorded: 2020–2021
- Studios: Abbey Road Studios, London
- Genre: Film score
- Length: 30:47
- Label: ABKCO
- Producers: Wes Anderson; Randall Poster

Alexandre Desplat chronology
The Midnight Sky (Music from the Netflix Film) (2020)	The French Dispatch: Original Score (2021)	The Outfit: Original Motion Picture Soundtrack (2022)

No.	Title	Length
1.	"Obituary"	3:30
2.	"Simone, Naked, Cell Block J. Hobby Room"	2:54
3.	"Moses Rosenthaler"	2:29
4.	"Mouthwash de Menthe"	1:56
5.	"Cadazio Uncles and Nephew Gallery"	1:56
6.	"The Berensen Lectures at the Clampette Collection"	1:51
7.	"Police Cooking"	1:49
8.	"The Private Dining Room of the Police Commissioner"	5:10
9.	"Kidnappers Lair"	2:01
10.	"A Multi-Pronged Battle Plan"	1:37
11.	"Blackbird Pie"	0:53
12.	"Commandos, Guerillas, Snipers, Climbers and the Jeroboam"	0:52
13.	"Animated Car Chase"	1:52
14.	"Lt. Nescaffier (Seeking Something Missing...)"	1:55

=== The French Dispatch: Original Soundtrack ===
The French Dispatch: Original Soundtrack

Soundtrack album by various artists
- Released: October 22, 2021
- Genre: Film soundtrack
- Length: 61:05
- Label: ABKCO
- Producers: Wes Anderson; Randall Poster

Singles from The French Dispatch: Original Soundtrack
- 1. "Obituary" Released: September 14, 2021

No.	Title	Artist(s)	Length
1.	"Obituary"	Alexandre Desplat	3:30
2.	"After You've Gone" (from Sadie McKee)	Gene Austin with Candy and Coco	1:07
3.	"Simone, Naked, Cell Block J. Hobby Room"	Desplat	2:54
4.	"Fiasco"	Gus Viseur	2:58
5.	"Moses Rosenthaler"	Desplat	2:29
6.	"I've Seen That Face Before (Libertango)"	Grace Jones	4:30
7.	"Mouthwash de Menthe"	Desplat	1:56
8.	"Sonata for Mandolin and Guitar A-Dur, K. 331 Andante Grazioso con Variation VI. Variation 5 – Adagio"	Boris Björn Bagger and Detlef Tewes	3:34
9.	"Cadazio Uncles and Nephew Gallery"	Desplat	1:56
10.	"Inseguimento al Taxi (The Chase)" (from Scent of Mystery)	Mario Nascimbene	2:40
11.	"The Berensen Lectures at the Clampette Collection"	Desplat	1:51
12.	"L'ultima volta" (from I malamondo)	Ennio Morricone	2:34
13.	"Tu m'as trop menti"	Chantal Goya	1:47
14.	"J'en déduis que je t'aime"	Charles Aznavour	3:05
15.	"Fugue No. 2 in C minor (The Well-Tempered Clavier, Book 2, BWV 871)"	The Swingle Singers	1:19
16.	"Adagio" (from Comptes à rebours)	Georges Delerue	3:13
17.	"Police Cooking"	Desplat	1:49
18.	"The Private Dining Room of the Police Commissioner"	Desplat	5:10
19.	"Kidnappers Lair"	Desplat	2:01
20.	"A Multi-Pronged Battle Plan"	Desplat	1:37
21.	"Blackbird Pie"	Desplat	0:53
22.	"Commandos, Guerillas, Snipers, Climbers and the Jeroboam"	Desplat	0:52
23.	"Animated Car Chase"	Desplat	1:52
24.	"Lt. Nescaffier (Seeking Something Missing...)"	Desplat	1:56
25.	"Aline"	Jarvis Cocker	3:32

== Reception ==
Music critic Jonathan Broxton described the score as "an overload of whimsy, a landslide of musical hipsterism that buries you in a pile of twee from which there is no escape". James Southall of Movie Wave wrote "the best way of experiencing the score is to do so in sequence, but the album scatters in an array of songs and orchestral pieces – it's all good stuff, but focusing on the Desplat is rewarding". Marcy Donelson of AllMusic complimented it as a "lean, jaunty chamber music score". A. O. Scott of The New York Times described the score as "playful and knowing". David Rooney of The Hollywood Reporter wrote that Desplat's "doodling piano themes help shape the jaunty tone". Ann Hornaday of The Washington Post complimented the score as "delicately thoughtful" which benefits the film. Joe Morgenstern of The Wall Street Journal described it as "funny".

== Accolades ==
Award	Date of ceremony	Category	Recipient(s)	Result	Ref.
British Academy Film Awards	March 13, 2022	Best Original Score	Alexandre Desplat	Nominated	
Chicago Film Critics Association	December 15, 2021	Best Original Score	Alexandre Desplat	Nominated	
Florida Film Critics Circle	December 22, 2021	Best Score	Alexandre Desplat	Nominated	
Golden Globe Awards	January 9, 2022	Best Original Score	Alexandre Desplat	Nominated	
Hollywood Critics Association	February 28, 2022	Best Score	Alexandre Desplat	Nominated	
Hollywood Music in Media Awards	November 17, 2021	Best Original Score in a Feature Film	Alexandre Desplat	Nominated	
Houston Film Critics Society	January 19, 2022	Best Original Score	Alexandre Desplat	Nominated	
International Film Music Critics Association Awards	February 17, 2022	Best Original Score for a Comedy Film	Alexandre Desplat	Nominated	
Online Film Critics Society	January 24, 2022	Best Original Score	Alexandre Desplat	Nominated	
San Francisco Bay Area Film Critics Circle	January 10, 2022	Best Original Score	Alexandre Desplat	Nominated	
Satellite Awards	April 2, 2022	Best Original Score	Alexandre Desplat	Nominated	
Seattle Film Critics Society	January 17, 2022	Best Original Score	Alexandre Desplat	Nominated	
Washington D.C. Area Film Critics Association	December 6, 2021	Best Score	Alexandre Desplat	Nominated	
