= Chas McDevitt =

Scottish musician (born 1934)

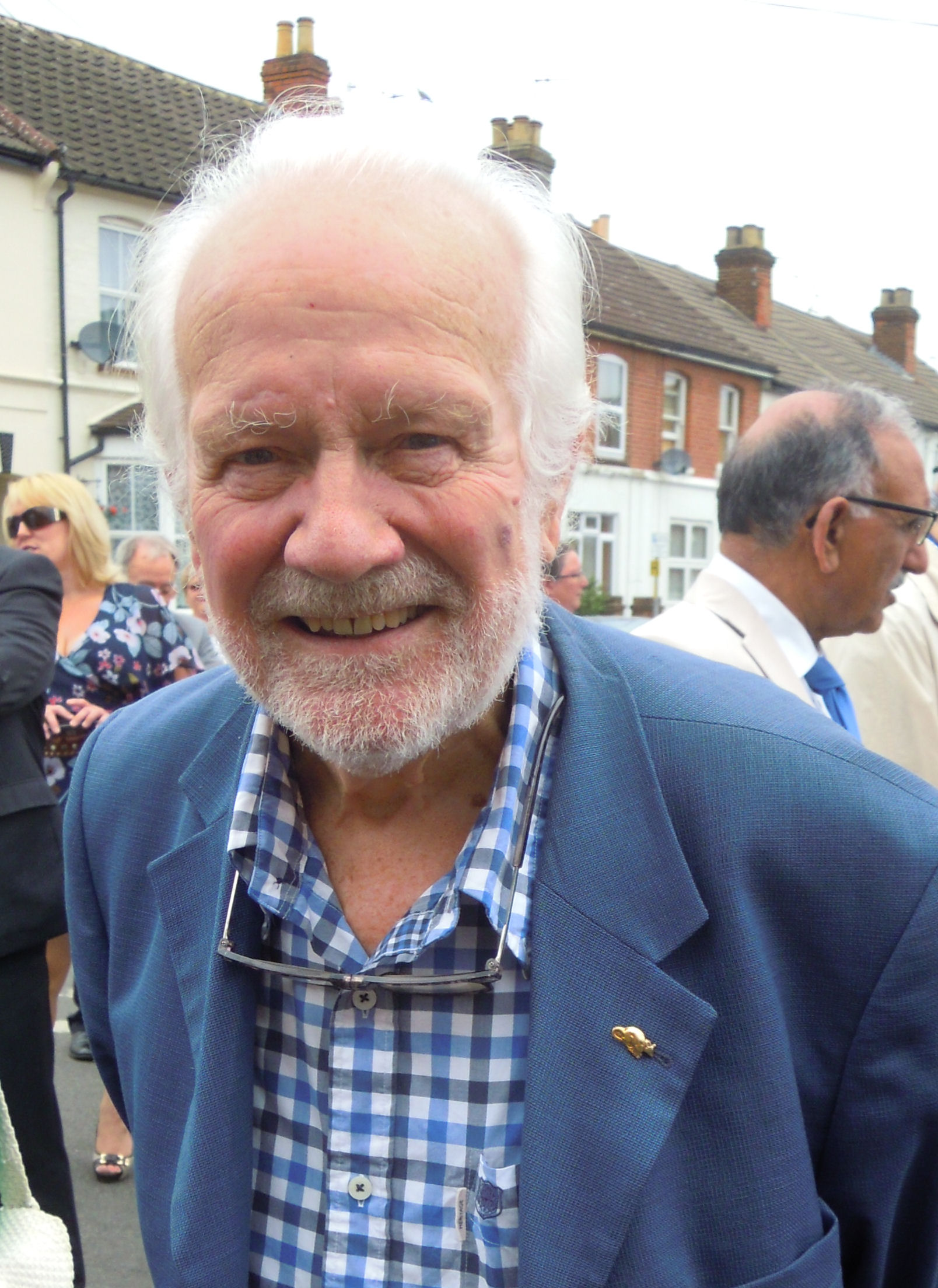
- Chas McDevitt in 2017

Background information
- Born: 4 December 1934 (age 91); Eaglesham, Glasgow, Scotland
- Genres: Skiffle, Dixiland Jazz
- Occupation: Musician
- Instruments: Banjo, Guitar, Whistling, Vocals
- Label: Oriole Records
- Member of: The Chas McDevitt Skiffle Group

Charles James McDevitt (born 4 December 1934) is a Scottish musician who was one of the leading lights of the skiffle genre which was highly influential and popular in the United Kingdom in the mid-to-late 1950s.

== Biography ==
=== Early life ===
McDevitt was born in Eaglesham, Glasgow, Scotland. His family moved to Camberley, Surrey, when he was a child. As a teenager he taught himself the banjo, and whistled in a lot of his starting music. He began corresponding with blues artists including Josh White. He also joined a local Dixieland jazz group.

=== Music career ===
McDevitt moved to London in 1955, and began playing with the Crane River Jazz Band. At the same time, he formed a small skiffle group, which busked and performed in coffee bars and jazz clubs in Soho. It won a talent contest, organised by Radio Luxembourg.

In late 1956, whilst recording the song "Freight Train" – written by folk blues singer Elizabeth Cotten – for Oriole Records, studio owner Bill Varley suggested they should add a female singer. As a result, folk singer Nancy Whiskey was invited to join the Chas McDevitt Skiffle Group, and they re-recorded the song with her vocals. The record became a hit in the UK in 1957 at the height of the skiffle boom, reaching Number 5 in the UK Singles Chart.

In the United States, the song was covered by Rusty Draper, who had the bigger hit. Nevertheless, McDevitt's group appeared on The Ed Sullivan Show, their record became a million seller, and their success led them to tour with acts such as Slim Whitman and Frankie Lymon & The Teenagers. They also replaced Jerry Lee Lewis on his ill-fated 1958 tour of the UK. The Chas McDevitt Skiffle Group was the only British skiffle group, other than Lonnie Donegan's, to achieve international success.

After Whiskey left in 1957, McDevitt had less commercial success, and his group disbanded around 1959. He then formed a duo with his wife Shirley Douglas, until their professional and personal relationship ended in the 1970s. Since then, McDevitt has continued to perform as the leader of a re-formed group, and also remains active in charitable work, including through his membership of the showbusiness charity the Grand Order of Water Rats.

Nancy Whiskey died in February 2003. In 2006, McDevitt appeared on the BBC television quiz show Never Mind the Buzzcocks.
