= Johnny Duncan (bluegrass musician) =

American musician (1932–2000)

- Born: John Franklin Duncan; September 7, 1932; Oliver Springs, Tennessee, United States
- Died: July 15, 2000 (aged 67) Taree, New South Wales, Australia
- Genres: Bluegrass, skiffle, country
- Occupations: Musician, singer
- Instruments: Vocals, guitar, mandolin
- Years active: c.1955–1970s
- Labels: Columbia, Pye

John Franklin Duncan (September 7, 1932 – July 15, 2000) was an American bluegrass and skiffle musician. He became popular in Britain in 1957 with "Last Train to San Fernando", which reached number two in the UK Singles Chart.

== Biography ==
Duncan was born in the Windrock coal-mining camp overlooking the town of Oliver Springs, Tennessee, United States. In his teens he moved to Texas where he learned guitar and mandolin, and played in a hillbilly trio. He served in the US Air Force, and in 1952 was garrisoned in Cambridgeshire, England, where he met and married a local girl, Betty, in 1953. When performing for American servicemen at Bushey, Hertfordshire, in 1956, he was seen by Dickie Bishop, banjoist in Chris Barber's Dixieland jazz band. Barber was looking for a new vocalist to replace Lonnie Donegan, who had started a solo career, and Duncan took over the role for several months before leaving Barber's band in early 1957.

Guided by record producer Denis Preston, Duncan then formed a new band, the Blue Grass Boys, with Donegan's former guitarist Denny Wright together with drummer Lennie Hastings and bassist Jack Fallon. They began appearing regularly on a new BBC radio show, Saturday Skiffle Club (later Saturday Club). Their first recording was a commercially unsuccessful cover version of Hank Williams' "Kaw-Liga". In 1957, their recording of a calypso called "Last Train to San Fernando" – originally co-written by Trinidadian musician Mighty Dictator (Kenneth St. Bernard) and recorded by The Duke of Iron, was personally disliked by Duncan. The track was arranged by Wright and Fallon, who gave the piece a strong "country" feel in the erroneous belief that San Fernando was in Texas or the Los Angeles, California suburb, rather than Trinidad, although Wright's guitar solo has a strong Trinidadian feel to it.

Duncan briefly became a star in Britain, touring with Wee Willie Harris, Cliff Richard, and American singer Marvin Rainwater, and appearing regularly on BBC radio and the TV show Six-Five Special, produced by Jack Good. Duncan had two other entries in the UK Singles Chart in 1957, with "Blue, Blue Heartaches" (No. 27) and "Footprints in the Snow" (No. 22).

Although Duncan continued to record for a period of time, the skiffle fad faded and so did his success. Duncan lived in the United States in the 1960s, before returning to England where he recorded two albums in the 1970s. Following his divorce he emigrated to Australia, briefly returned to the United Kingdom, and then back to Australia where he married for a second time. He retired from the music industry and suffered from ill health, but made some further recordings in the 1990s after a revival of interest in his 1950s recordings.

He died of cancer in Australia, in 2000.
