= Skiffle =

Genre of folk music

- Stylistic origins: Bluegrass; blues; country; folk; jazz
- Cultural origins: Southern United States
- Derivative forms: Beat music; British blues; British rock and roll; British rock; British folk revival

Regional scenes
- United Kingdom

Other topics
- Jug band

Skiffle is a genre of folk music with influences from American folk music, blues, country, bluegrass, and jazz, generally performed with a mixture of manufactured and homemade or improvised instruments.

Originating as a form in the United States in the first half of the 20th century, it became extremely popular in the United Kingdom in the 1950s, where it was played by such artists as Lonnie Donegan, the Vipers Skiffle Group, Ken Colyer, and Chas McDevitt.

Skiffle was a major part of the early careers of some musicians who later became prominent in other genres, including the Quarrymen (who were later renamed the Beatles), Tony Sheridan, and Rory Gallagher. The skiffle style has been seen as a critical stepping stone to the second British folk revival, the British blues boom, and the British Invasion of American popular music.

== Origins in the United States ==
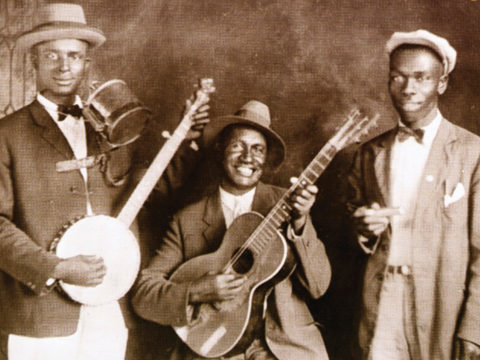
Gus Cannon's Jug Stompers, c. 1928

Skiffle is often said to have developed from New Orleans jazz, but this claim has been disputed. Improvised jug bands playing blues and jazz were common across the American South in the early decades of the 20th century. They used instruments such as the washboard, jugs, washtub bass, cigar-box fiddle, musical saw and comb-and-paper kazoos, as well as more conventional instruments, such as acoustic guitar and banjo.

The origin of the English word skiffle is unknown. However, in the dialect of the west of England to make a skiffle, meaning to make a mess of any business, is attested from 1873. In early 20th century America the term skiffle was one of many slang phrases for a rent party, a social event with a small charge designed to pay rent on a house. It was first recorded in Chicago in the 1920s and may have been brought there as part of the African-American migration to northern industrial cities.

The first use of the term on record was in 1925 in the name of Jimmy O'Bryant and his Chicago Skifflers. Most often it was used to describe country blues music records, which included the compositions "Hometown Skiffle" (1929) and "Skiffle Blues" (1946) by Dan Burley & his Skiffle Boys. It was used by Ma Rainey (1886–1939) to describe her repertoire to rural audiences. The term skiffle disappeared from American music in the 1940s.

== Revival in the United Kingdom ==
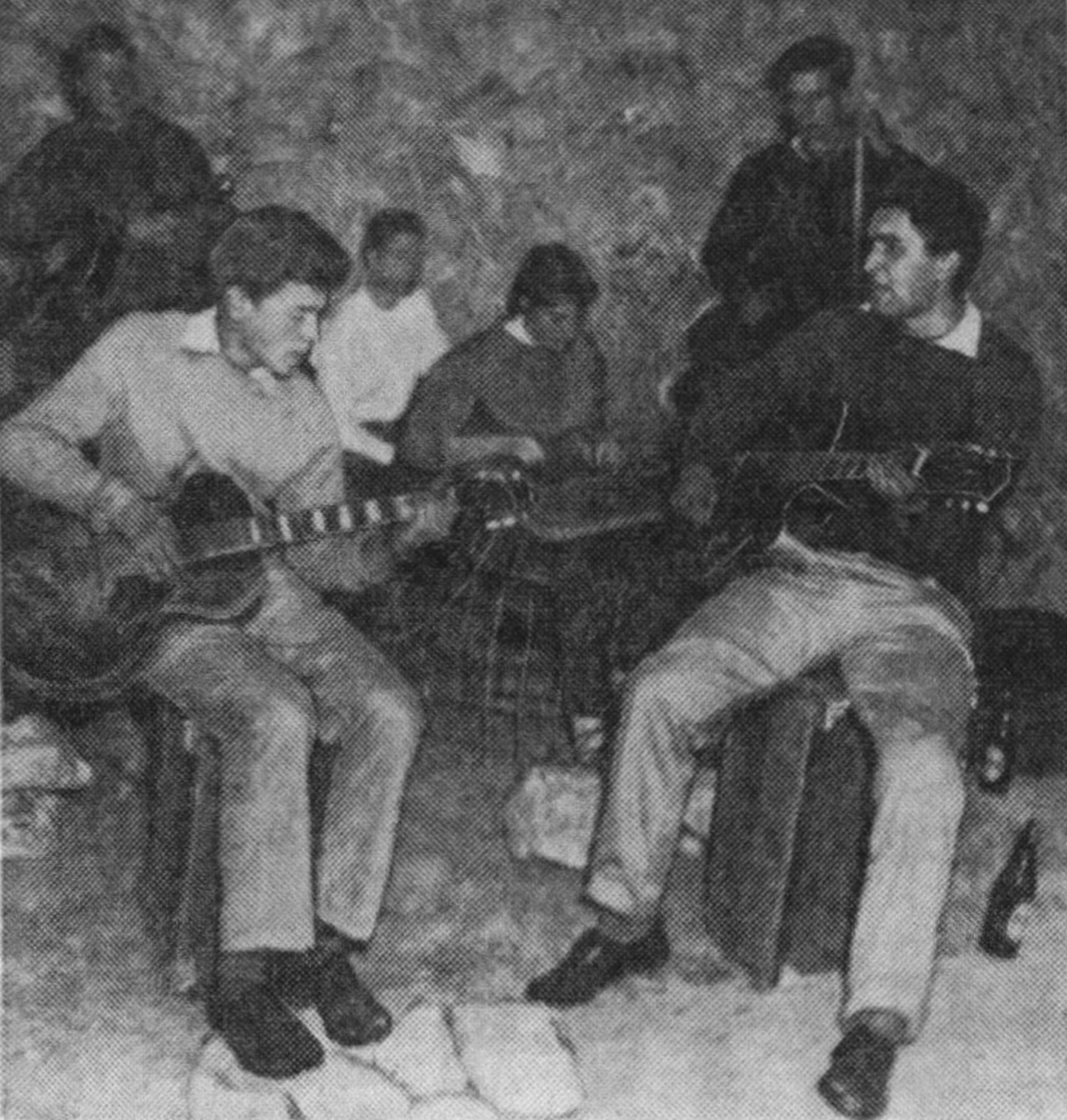
The Alcove Skiffle Group performing in Chislehurst Caves, 1957

Skiffle was a relatively obscure genre, and it might have been largely forgotten if not for its revival in the United Kingdom in the 1950s and the success of its main proponent, Lonnie Donegan. British skiffle grew out of the developing post-war British jazz scene, which saw a move away from swing music and towards trad jazz. Among these bands were Bill Bailey Skiffle Group and Ken Colyer's Jazzmen, a band formed by Chris Barber. Lonnie Donegan played banjo for the Jazzmen, and also performed skiffle music during intervals. He would sing and play guitar with accompaniment of two other members, usually on washboard and tea-chest bass. They played a variety of American folk and blues songs, particularly those derived from the recordings of Lead Belly, in a lively style that emulated American jug bands. These were listed on posters as "skiffle" breaks, a name suggested by Ken Colyer's brother Bill after recalling the Dan Burley Skiffle Group. Soon the breaks were as popular as traditional jazz. After disagreements in 1954, Colyer left to form a new outfit, and the band became Chris Barber's Jazz Band.

The first British recordings of skiffle were made by Colyer's new band for Decca in June 1954, but it was the label's release of two skiffle tracks by Barber's Jazz Band under the name of the "Lonnie Donegan Skiffle Group" that transformed the fortunes of skiffle in late 1955. Donegan's fast-tempo version of Lead Belly's "Rock Island Line" was a major hit in 1956, featuring a washboard (but not a tea-chest bass), with "John Henry" on the B-side. It spent eight months in the Top 20, peaking at No. 6 (and No. 8 in the U.S.). It was the first debut record to go gold in Britain, selling over a million copies worldwide.

The Acoustic Music organization makes this comment about Donegan's "Rock Island Line". "It flew up the English charts. Donegan had synthesized American Southern Blues with simple acoustic instruments: acoustic guitar, washtub bass and washboard rhythm. The new style was called 'Skiffle' .... and referred to music from people with little money for instruments. The new style captivated an entire generation of post-war youth in England." After splitting from Barber, Donegan went on to make a series of popular records as "Lonnie Donegan's Skiffle Group", with successes including "Cumberland Gap" (1957), "Does Your Chewing Gum Lose Its Flavour" (1958) and "My Old Man's a Dustman" (1960).

It was the success of Donegan's "Rock Island Line" and the lack of a need for expensive instruments or high levels of musicianship that set off the British skiffle craze. A few bands enjoyed chart success in the skiffle craze, including the Chas McDevitt Skiffle Group ("Freight Train"), Johnny Duncan and the Bluegrass Boys, and the Vipers, but the main impact of skiffle was as a grassroots amateur movement, particularly popular among working class men, who could cheaply buy, improvise, or build their own instruments and who have been seen as reacting against the drab austerity of post-war Britain. The craze probably reached its height with the broadcasting of the BBC TV programme Six-Five Special from 1957. It was the first British youth music programme, using a skiffle song as its title music and showcasing many skiffle acts. However, the British rock and roll scene was starting to take off, producing home-grown stars like Tommy Steele, Marty Wilde and Cliff Richard and the Shadows (themselves originally involved in skiffle). By February 1958, Pete Murray, host of Six-Five Special, noted a trend of groups wishing to "play down that word skiffle", considering it limiting. By the end of 1958, the boom was over as enthusiasts either abandoned music for more stable employment or moved into some of the forms of music that it had first suggested, including folk, blues and rock and roll. As a result, it has been seen as a critical stepping stone to the second folk revival, blues boom and the British Invasion of the US popular music scene. Donegan continued his career in skiffle until his death in 2002.

It has been estimated that in the late 1950s, there were 30,000–50,000 skiffle groups in Britain. Sales of guitars grew rapidly, and other musicians were able to perform on improvised bass and percussion in venues such as church halls and cafes and in the flourishing coffee bars of Soho, London, like the 2i's Coffee Bar, the Cat's Whisker and nightspots like Coconut Grove and Churchill's, without having to aspire to musical perfection or virtuosity. A large number of British musicians began their careers playing skiffle in this period, and some became leading figures in their fields. These included leading Northern Irish musician Van Morrison and British blues pioneer Alexis Korner, as well as Ronnie Wood, Alex Harvey and Mick Jagger; folk musicians Martin Carthy, John Renbourn and Ashley Hutchings; rock musicians Roger Daltrey, Jimmy Page, Ritchie Blackmore, Robin Trower and David Gilmour; and popular Beat-music successes Graham Nash and Allan Clarke of the Hollies. Most notably, the Beatles developed from John Lennon's 1957 skiffle group the Quarrymen; Paul McCartney was added after a few months and George Harrison joined in 1958. Similarly, the Bee Gees developed from Barry Gibb's skiffle group The Rattlesnakes.

In a 2010 radio interview, Tony Sheridan recalls his encounter with skiffle: "I always felt a bit out of place anyway. So when the puberty thing started, Lonnie Donegan came along, I think it was the end of '55, early '56. Rock Island Line. All I heard was the beginning [of the song]... It sort of turned a switch in me. I'm sure John Lennon on the other side of the country, in Liverpool, I'm sure he felt something very, very similar... the first time he heard Donegan. It was usually Donegan with us, you know, before Elvis."

During summer 1970, the skiffle-like song "In the Summertime" by British band Mungo Jerry reached the top of the charts in several countries around the world. In 2017, performer Billy Bragg's book Roots, Radicals and Rockers, a history of the skiffle movement, was published. Bragg has compared the development of skiffle in Britain in the 1950s to punk rock in the 1970s, noting that skiffle was a revolt by young people against the culture of their parents, and allowed them to create their own style of music without expensive equipment or great musical virtuosity.
