= 20th Century Masters – The Millennium Collection: The Best of The Reverend Horton Heat =

Greatest hits album by The Reverend Horton Heat
- Released: October 10, 2006
- Recorded: Last Beat Studios, Dallas, Texas
- Genre: Psychobilly
- Length: 46:49
- Label: Interscope
- Producer: Al Jourgensen, Thom Panunzio, Ed Stasium

The Reverend Horton Heat chronology
We Three Kings: christmas favorites (2005)	20th Century Masters – The Millennium Collection: The Best of The Reverend Horton Heat (2006)	Laughin' & Cryin' with the Reverend Horton Heat (2009)

20th Century Masters – The Millennium Collection: The Best of The Reverend Horton Heat is a retrospective compilation album by The Reverend Horton Heat. It was released by Interscope Records in January 2006. The album consists of remastered versions of tracks that appeared on the band's three Interscope albums, Liquor in the Front (1994), It's Martini Time (1996), and Space Heater (1998).

== Track listing ==
All tracks are written by Jim Heath, except where noted.

No.	Title	Writer(s)	Length
1.	"Big Red Rocket of Love"		3:04
2.	"It's Martini Time"		3:14
3.	"Jimbo Song"	Heath, Wallace	2:20
4.	"Slow"	Reverend Horton Heat	4:24
5.	"Pride of San Jacinto"	Wallace	3:13
6.	"Texas Rock-A-Billy Rebel"		2:46
7.	"Crooked Cigarette"		2:53
8.	"Now, Right Now"		2:38
9.	"Forbidden Jungle"		2:17
10.	"Lie Detector"		3:23
11.	"Baby I'm Drunk"		3:12
12.	"Generation Why"		2:45
13.	"The Prophet Stomp"		3:01
14.	"That's Showbiz"		4:32
15.	"Big Sky"		3:07

== Personnel ==
- Jim Heath (aka Rev. Horton Heat) – vocals, guitar
- Jimbo Wallace – upright bass
- Taz Bentley – drums
- Scott Churilla – percussion, drums
- Adam Abrams – production coordination
- Al Jourgensen – producer
- Gavin Lurssen – mastering
- Ryan Null – photo coordination
- Thom Panunzio – producer
- Lisa Peardon – photography
- Ken Settle – photography
- Dana Smart – compilation supervisor
- Ed Stasium – producer
- Dave Thompson – liner notes
