= Rev (The Reverend Horton Heat album) =

REV

Studio album by The Reverend Horton Heat
- Released: January 21, 2014
- Studio: Universal Rehearsal Studios and Modern Electric Sound, Dallas, Texas
- Genre: Rockabilly
- Length: 46:30
- Label: Victory
- Producer: Jim Heath

The Reverend Horton Heat chronology
Laughin' & Cryin' with the Reverend Horton Heat (2009)	REV (2014)	Whole New Life (2018)

Rev is The Reverend Horton Heat's eleventh studio album, released with Victory Records on January 21, 2014. Peaking at number 111 on the Billboard 200 in the US, it is their highest-charting record to date.

== Track listing ==
All songs by James C. Heath except "Chasing Rainbows" by James C. Heath and James F. Wallace.

1. "Victory Lap" – 3:23
2. "Smell of Gasoline" – 4:16
3. "Never Gonna Stop It" – 3:14
4. "Zombie Dumb" – 3:52
5. "Spooky Boots" – 4:41
6. "Schizoid" – 3:06
7. "Scenery Going By" – 4:37
8. "My Hat" – 2:14
9. "Let Me Teach You How To Eat" – 3:18
10. "Mad Mad Heart" – 3:10
11. "Longest Gonest Man" – 2:53
12. "Hardscrabble Women" – 3:39
13. "Chasing Rainbows" – 4:07

== Personnel ==
- Jim "Reverend Horton" Heath – lead vocal, guitar, baritone guitar, acoustic guitar, background vocals, recording engineer, record producer
- Jim "Jimbo" Wallace – upright bass, background vocals
- Scott Churilla – drums, percussion, background vocals
- Tim Alexander – accordion on "Schizoid"
- Hoss – background vocals on "Hardscrabble Woman"
