= Laughin' & Cryin' with the Reverend Horton Heat =

Studio album by The Reverend Horton Heat
- Released: September 1, 2009
- Studio: Audio Dallas, Dallas, Texas
- Genre: Rockabilly
- Length: 48:10
- Label: Yep Roc
- Producer: Reverend Horton Heat, Tim Alexander

The Reverend Horton Heat chronology
20th Century Masters - The Millennium Collection: The Best of The Reverend Horton Heat (2006)	Laughin' & Cryin' with the Reverend Horton Heat (2009)	REV (2014)

Professional ratings
Review scores
Source	Rating
AllMusic	3/5 stars
Classic Rock	7/10 stars

Laughin' & Cryin' with the Reverend Horton Heat is The Reverend Horton Heat's tenth studio album.

== Track listing ==
All songs written by Jim Heath except as noted.

1. "Drinkin' and Smokin' Cigarettes" – 4:04
2. "Ain't No Saguaro in Texas" – 3:41
3. "Death Metal Guys" (Heath, Simmons, Wallace) – 3:20
4. "River Ran Dry" – 2:40
5. "Please Don't Take the Baby to the Liquor Store" (Wallace, Heath) – 2:53
6. "Aw, the Humanity" – 4:40
7. "Rural Point of View" – 3:30
8. "Oh God! Doesn't Work in Vegas" – 4:28
9. "Spacewalk" – 2:45
10. "Beer Holder" – 3:48
11. "Crazy Ex-Boyfriend" – 3:19
12. "There's a Little Bit of Everything in Texas" (Ernest Tubb) – 2:24
13. "Just Let Me Hold My Paycheck" – 4:26
14. "Oh By Jingo!" (Lew Brown, Albert Von Tilzer) – 2:08

== Personnel ==
Band members

- Jim "Reverend Horton" Heath – lead vocal, guitar, pedal steel guitar
- Jimbo Wallace – upright bass
- Paul Simmons – drums, background vocals

Additional musicians

- Tim Alexander – piano, accordion, bajo sexto, producer

Production

- Paul Osborn – engineer
- Dave McNair – mastering
- Vince Ruarus – cover art illustration
- Michael Triplett – design
- Drew Reynolds – photography
