= Space Heater =

Studio album by Reverend Horton Heat
- Released: March 24, 1998
- Recorded: Dallas Sound Labs, Dallas, Texas
- Genre: Rockabilly
- Length: 45:13
- Label: Interscope
- Producer: Ed Stasium

Reverend Horton Heat chronology
| It's Martini Time (1996) | Space Heater (1998) | Holy Roller (1999) |

Singles from Space Heater
- 1. "Lie Detector" Released: 1998

Professional ratings
Review scores
| Source | Rating |
|---|---|
| Allmusic | 3/5 stars |
| CMJ | (favorable) |
| Melody Maker | 3/5 stars |

Space Heater is the fifth album by Reverend Horton Heat, released by Interscope Records in March 1998. It charted on the Billboard 200, reaching number 187. "Pride of San Jacinto" appears in the videogame Hot Wheels Turbo Racing.

== Album art ==
The front-cover album art is a parody of 1950s horror movie posters. It plays on a double entendre, turning 1950s-era space heaters into alien spacecraft invading from outer space, complete with search lights or tractor beams.

== Track listing ==
1. "Pride of San Jacinto" (Wallace) – 3:13
2. "Lie Detector" (Heath) – 3:24
3. "Hello Mrs. Darkness" (Heath) – 3:11
4. "Jimbo Song" (Heath/Wallace) – 2:21
5. "Revolution Under Foot" (Heath/Wallace/Churilla) – 4:29
6. "Starlight Lounge" (Heath) – 2:48
7. "Goin' Manic" (Heath/Churilla/Wallace) – 4:27
8. "Mi Amor" (Heath) – 3:05
9. "For Never More" (Heath/Wallace/Churilla) – 2:53
10. "The Prophet Stomp" (Heath) – 3:02
11. "Native Tongue of Love" (Heath) – 3:17
12. "Couch Surfin'" (Heath/Churilla) – 4:02
13. "Cinco de Mayo" (Heath/Churilla/Wallace/Stasium) – 2:11
14. "Texas Rock-A-Billy Rebel" (Heath) – 2:47
15. "Baby I'm Drunk" (Heath) – 3:11
16. "Space Heater" (Heath/Churilla/Wallace) – 9:47

== Personnel ==
Back cover

- Jim "Reverend Horton" Heath - guitars, vocals, harmonica (on "Pride of San Jacinto" and "Goin' Manic"), ukulele (on "The Prophet Stomp")
- Jimbo Wallace - upright bass, backing vocals
- Scott Churilla - drums, backing vocals (on "Jimbo Song" and "Couch Surfin')
- Tim Alexander - piano (on "Lie Detector"), accordion on ("Mi Amor")
- Ed Stasium - producer, recorder, mixer
- Phillip Green - assistant recorder
- Marvin Hlavenka - assistant recorder
- Junichi Murakawa - assistant mixer
- Greg Calbi - mastering
- Tom Whalley - A&R direction
- Scott Weiss - management
- Jeffrey Taylor Light - legal
- Unleashed - art direction + design
- Lisa Peardon - photography

== Charts ==
| Chart (1998) | Peak position |
|---|---|
| US Billboard 200 | 187 |
| US Heatseekers (Billboard) | 14 |
