= Big Little Baby =

Single by Reverend Horton Heat

from the album The Full-Custom Gospel Sounds of the Reverend Horton Heat
- B-side: "Bullet"
- Released: 1988
- Genre: Psychobilly
- Length: 2:32
- Label: Four Dots
- Songwriter: Jim Heath

Reverend Horton Heat singles chronology
"Big Little Baby" (1988)	"Psychobilly Freakout" (1990)

"Big Little Baby" is the first 7" single by The Reverend Horton Heat. It was released in 1988 on Four Dots Records. It is the only recording to feature the band's original lineup of Heath, Barton, and Baranowski.

== Track listing ==
1. "Big Little Baby"
2. "Bullet"

== Personnel ==
- Reverend Horton Heat (Jim Heath) - vocals, guitar
- "Swingin'" Jack Barton - upright bass
- Bobby Baranowski - drums
