= Jimbo Wallace =

American bassist and vocalist

Jimbo Wallace is an upright and electric bass player, vocalist, and songwriter in the psychobilly and rockabilly genres. He has played bass in the Reverend Horton Heat band since 1989.

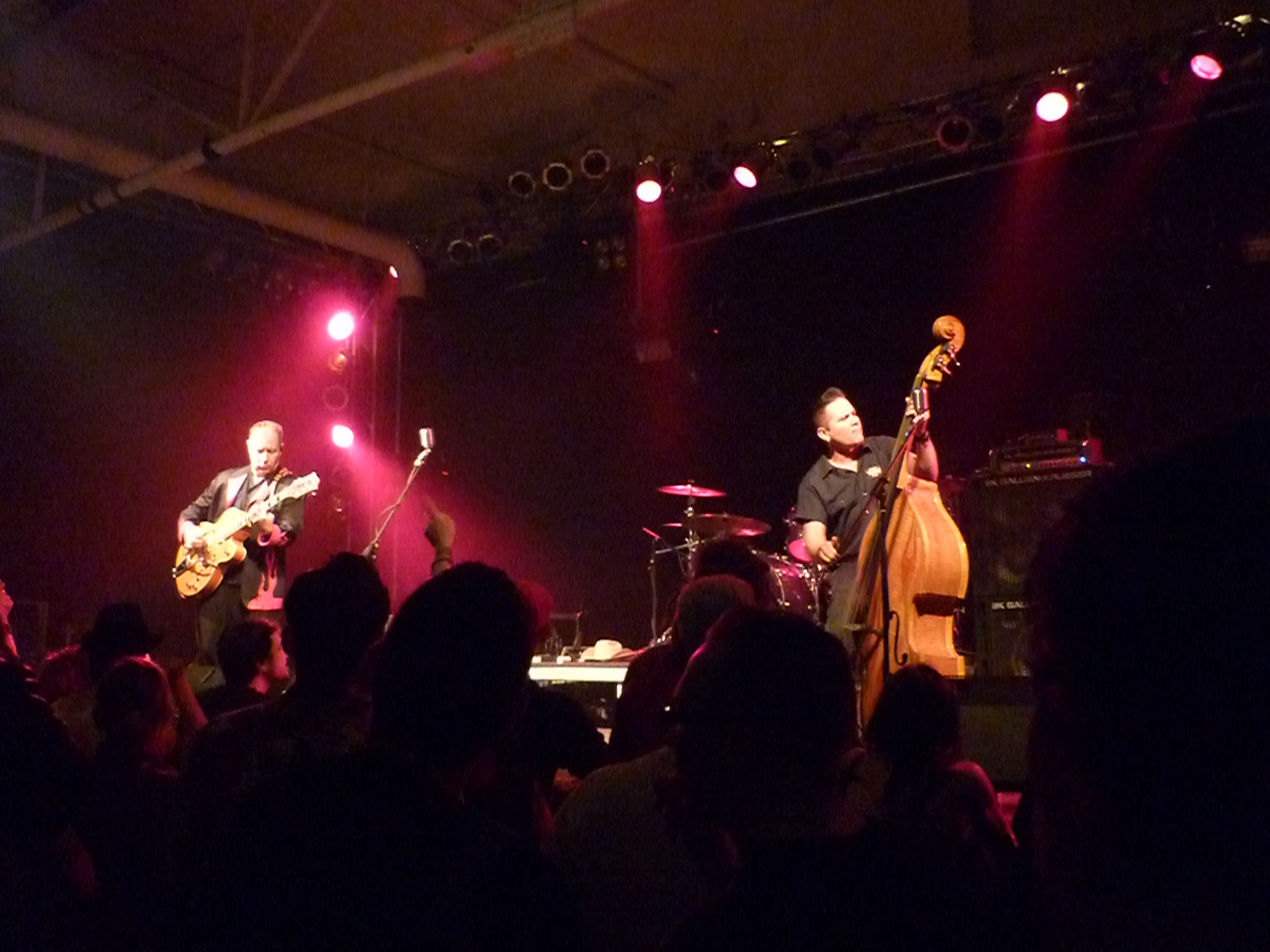
Wallace performing with RHH in 2010

He plays using the percussive rockabilly/psychobilly bass technique known as slap bass, in which the strings are pulled away from the fingerboard until they snap back, and the strings are rhythmically slapped against the fingerboard. The German rockabilly bassist Didi Beck cites Wallace as one of his influences.

Concert reviews take note of the stunts that Wallace does with the bass, such as throwing it into the air or playing it on its side while Heath stands on top of it and plays guitar. He has a signature tiger-striped upright bass manufactured by King Double Basses. He has been an endorser for Gallien-Krueger bass amplifiers. On stage, he uses a 4x10" cabinet and a 1x15" cabinet with a GK amp.

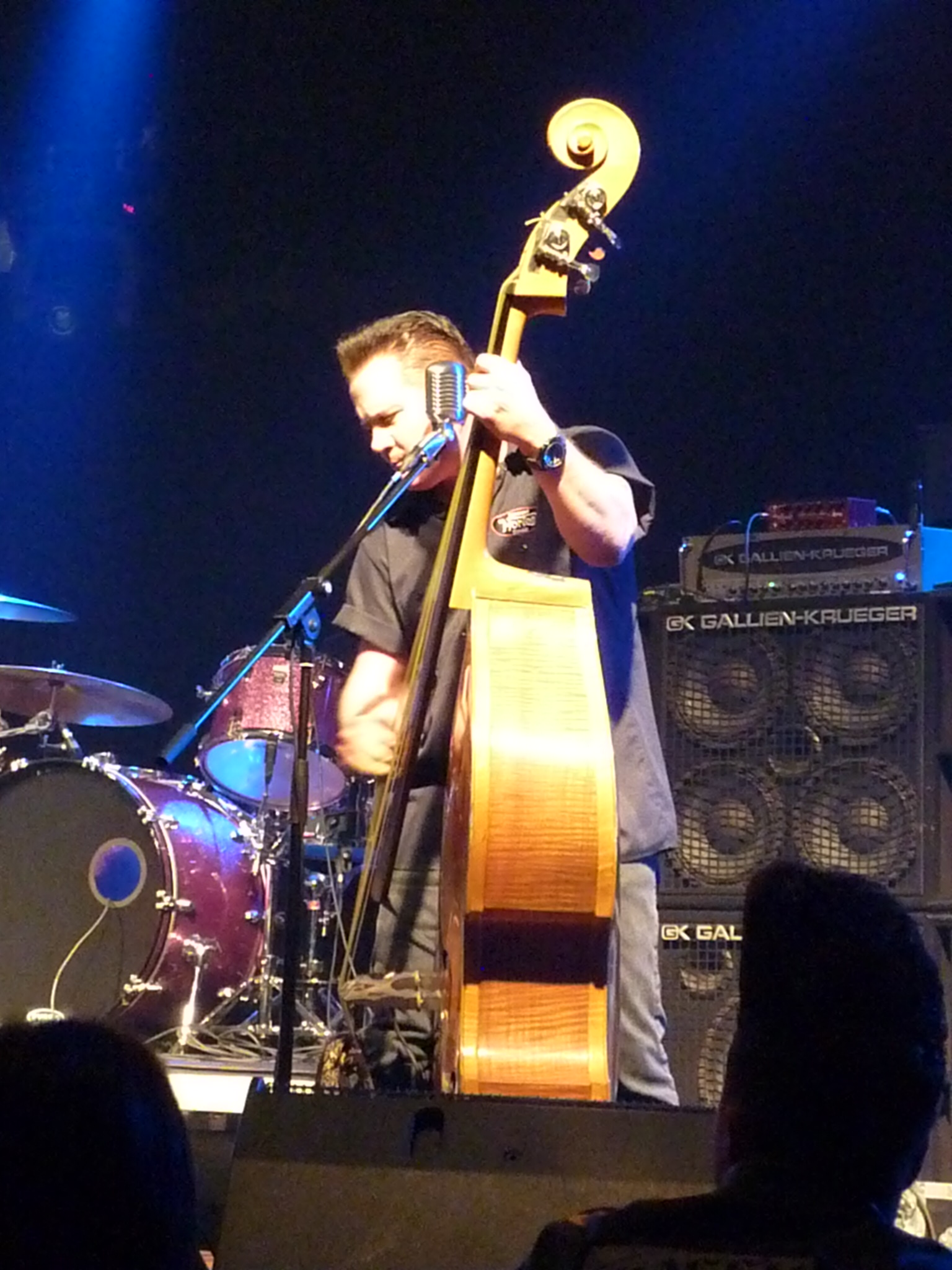
Wallace onstage with Reverend Horton Heat

== Discography ==
This discography is from AllMusic

- 2013; Discovery Vaults; The Reverend Horton Heat; Bass (Electric), Bass (Upright), Vocals (Background)
- 2013; White People & the Damage Done; Jello Biafra & the Guantanamo School of Medicine; upright Slap Bass
- 2012; 25 to Life; The Reverend Horton Heat; Composer
- 2009; Laughin' & Cryin' with the Reverend Horton Heat; The Reverend Horton Heat; Bass (Upright)
- 2008; Psychobilly Christmas; Bass (Upright)
- 2006; 20th Century Masters - The Millennium Collection: The Best of the Reverend Horton Heat; The Reverend Horton Heat; Composer, Guitar (Bass), Main Personnel, Vocals (Background)
- 2005; We Three Kings; The Reverend Horton Heat; Bass (Upright), Guitar, Main Personnel, Vocals (Background)
- 2004; Revival; The Reverend Horton Heat; Bass, Guitar (Bass), Member of Attributed Artist
- 2002; Lucky 7; The Reverend Horton Heat; Bass (Electric), Bass (Upright), Vocals (Background)
- 2000; Spend a Night in the Box; The Reverend Horton Heat; Bass, Vocals
- 1999; Holy Roller; The Reverend Horton Heat; Bass, Composer, Vocals
- 1999; IFC: In Your Ear, Vol. 1; Composer
- 1999; Mustache; Mustache; Bass
- 1999; Rebel Heart, Vol. 6; Gene Vincent; Bass
- 1998; Space Bunnies Must Die!; Composer
- 1998; Space Heater; The Reverend Horton Heat; Bass, Composer
- 1996; It's Martini Time; The Reverend Horton Heat; Composer
- 1996; Rebel Heart, Vol. 3; Gene Vincent; Bass
- 1994; Liquor in the Front; The Reverend Horton Heat; Composer
- 1993; The Full Custom Gospel Sounds; The Reverend Horton Heat; Bass, Bass (Upright), Vocals
- 1990; Smoke 'Em If You Got 'Em; The Reverend Horton Heat; Bass, Bass (Upright), Composer, Vocals
