= Lucky 7 (The Reverend Horton Heat album) =

Studio album by The Reverend Horton Heat
- Released: February 26, 2002
- Recorded: October – November 2001
- Studio: Castle Oaks Studios, Calabasas, California
- Genre: Psychobilly
- Length: 49:43
- Label: Artemis
- Producer: Ed Stasium

The Reverend Horton Heat chronology
Spend a Night in the Box (2000)	Lucky 7 (2002)	Revival (2004)

Professional ratings
Review scores
Source	Rating
AllMusic	3/5 stars
CMJ	favorable

Lucky 7 is the seventh studio album by the Reverend Horton Heat. It was released by Artemis Records in February 2002.

The song "Like a Rocket" (with altered lyrics) was chosen as the official Daytona 500 theme song for 2002.

== Track listing ==
All songs written by Jim Heath.

1. "Loco Gringos Like a Party" – 4:48
2. "Like a Rocket" – 2:43
3. "Reverend Horton Heat's Big Blue Car" – 3:36
4. "Galaxy 500" – 3:16
5. "What's Reminding Me of You" – 2:56
6. "The Tiny Voice of Reason" – 3:31
7. "Duel at the Two O'Clock Bell" – 5:52
8. "Go With Your Friends" – 3:30
9. "Ain't Gonna Happen" – 3:51
10. "Suicide Doors" – 2:56
11. "Remember Me" – 2:44
12. "Show Pony" – 1:44
13. "Sermon on the Jimbo" – 2:41
14. "You've Got a Friend in Jimbo" – 5:35

== Personnel ==
- Jim "Reverend Horton" Heath - vocals, guitar
- Jimbo Wallace - upright bass
- Scott Churilla - drums
- Ed Stasium - producer, recorder, mixer
- Jun - assistant engineer
- Hatch - assistant engineer
- Gene Grimaldi - mastering
- Kaylynn Campbell - CD package design and illustrations
- Johnny Ace - CD package design and illustrations
- Jeff Wood - CD package design and illustrations

== Charts ==
Chart (2002)	Peak position
US Top Independent Albums (Billboard)	15
US Heatseekers (Billboard)	32
