= Spend a Night in the Box =

Studio album by The Reverend Horton Heat
- Released: March 21, 2000
- Studio: Pedernales Studios, Spicewood, Texas
- Genre: Rockabilly
- Length: 49:45
- Label: Time Bomb
- Producer: Paul Leary

The Reverend Horton Heat chronology
Holy Roller (1999)	Spend a Night in the Box (2000)	Lucky 7 (2002)

Professional ratings
Review scores
Source	Rating
AllMusic	4/5 stars
Courier-News	2.5/4 stars
The Encyclopedia of Popular Music	3/5 stars
Ottawa Citizen	4/4 stars

Spend a Night in the Box is the sixth album by The Reverend Horton Heat. It was released by Time Bomb Recordings in 2000.

== Production ==
The album, produced by Paul Leary, was recorded at Pedernales Studios, in Texas. Jim "Reverend Horton" Heath played a 1954 Gibson ES-175 on the album.

== Critical reception ==
Exclaim! called the album "good, basic, well-produced country and swing-influenced rockabilly." The Austin Chronicle panned the "Gap-ready numbers like 'Sleeper Coach Driver' and 'Hand It to Me'," writing that "one Big Bad Voodoo Daddy is more than enough." Trouser Press wrote that "The Rev relocated his songwriting mojo for an album full of tasty rockabilly, swinging grooves and good old-fashioned stomp." CMJ New Music Report deemed it "a skillfully choreographed saloon rumble of an album."

== Track listing ==
All songs written by Jim Heath except as noted.

1. "Spend a Night in the Box" – 3:07
2. "Big D Boogie Woogie" – 2:55
3. "Sleeper Coach Driver" – 3:24
4. "The Girl in Blue" – 3:52
5. "Sue Jack Daniels" – 3:31
6. "Hand It to Me" – 3:23
7. "I'll Make Love" – 2:20
8. "It Hurts Your Daddy Bad" – 4:04
9. "The Bedroom Again" – 3:22
10. "King" – 2:41
11. "Whole Lotta Baby" – 3:42
12. "The Millionaire" (Heath/Churilla) – 3:56
13. "Unlucky in Love" – 4:33
14. "The Party in Your Head" – 3:55

== Personnel ==
- Jim "Reverend Horton" Heath - guitar & vocals
- Jimbo Wallace - upright bass
- Scott Churilla - drums
- Tim Alexander - piano (on "Sleeper Coach Driver"), piano and organ (on "Hand It to Me"), accordion and bajo quinto ("Unlucky in Love")
- Paul Leary - producer, mixer
- Stuart Sullivan - mixer, engineer
- Scott J. Weiss - management
- Jolie Clemens - artwork
- Jennifer Broussard - photography

== Charts ==
Chart (2000)	Peak position
US Heatseekers (Billboard)	23
