= Rock the Joint =

"Rock The Joint"

Single by Jimmy Preston & His Prestonians
- B-side: "Drinking Woman"
- Released: 1949
- Genre: Rhythm and blues; rock and roll; boogie woogie
- Length: 2:37
- Label: Gotham
- Songwriters: Harold Crafton, Wendell Keane, Harold Bagby

"Rock the Joint", also known as "We're Gonna Rock This Joint Tonight", is a 1949 boogie song recorded by various proto-rock and roll singers, notably Jimmy Preston and early rock and roll singers, most notably Bill Haley in 1952. Preston's version has been cited as a contender for being "the first rock and roll record", and Haley's is widely considered the first rockabilly record.

== Background ==
The song's authorship is credited to Harry Crafton, Wendell "Don" Keane, and Harry "Doc" Bagby, who were musicians contracted to the Gotham label in New York, owned by Ivin Ballen (although a live version recorded by Haley in 1969 for Buddah Records was credited to James Bracken). The song was influenced by earlier R&B recordings such as Wynonie Harris' 1948 R&B hit "Good Rockin' Tonight". Ballen passed the song to Jimmy Preston, who had recently had a hit with "Hucklebuck Daddy". The version by Jimmy Preston and His Prestonians was recorded in Philadelphia in May 1949 and was released on the Gotham label, reaching #6 on the national R&B chart later that year. Chris Powell and the Five Blue Flames would cover their version in that same year. Jimmy Cavallo released a version of the Jimmy Preston recording in 1955.

Two years later, Bill Haley and the Saddlemen had already achieved some success with their cover of Jackie Brenston's "Rocket 88", but were looking for another hit. They were persuaded by their producer, Essex Records owner Dave Miller, to cover "Rock The Joint" - a song which, like "Rocket 88", had already been successful with R&B audiences. Haley recorded the song in February or March 1952. The exact location is unknown but it is believed the song was recorded in the band's hometown of Chester, Pennsylvania ). Haley made up verses of his own to appeal to his country music audience, naming a succession of hillbilly dances (such as the Sugarfoot Rag and Virginia Reel) in place of Preston's hucklebuck and jitterbug, and also used different instrumentation on the track, and more back echo. In particular, Haley's version used a prominent percussive slapped bass played by Marshall Lytle in lieu of drums and electric guitar by Danny Cedrone, with a lick he duplicated two years later on "Rock Around The Clock". This version of "Rock the Joint" sold 75,000 copies.

A 2012 article stated that "The Comets’ beefed-up arrangement of "Rock This Joint" in 1952 was what convinced Haley to move away from his western swing sound towards rock ‘n’ roll".

Although Haley's version did not chart when released on Essex Records in 1952, it was enough of a hit in Chicago to win him a short residency in a jazz club there - although this was cut short after many of his black audiences walked out. Nevertheless, Haley's version of "Rock The Joint" - three years before "Rock Around The Clock" - was an important milestone in the development of rockabilly through the coming together of R&B and country styles.

The recording was remade in 1957 by Haley for Decca Records, by which time his band had been renamed Bill Haley & His Comets (it was released by Decca Records under the title "New Rock the Joint" as the original version was still in circulation). He later re-recorded the song for Sonet Records of Sweden in 1968 and numerous live versions were also recorded by him. One of these, recorded for Buddah Records in late 1969 for the live concert album Bill Haley's Scrapbook, carries both the alternate title "We're Gonna Rock This Joint Tonight" and an erroneous songwriting credit for James Bracken.

After Haley's death, members of the Comets who had served with Haley between 1951 and the early 1960s reunited and recorded several more versions of the song, such as for the 1994 Hydra Records album You're Never Too Old to Rock and again for the 1999 release on Rollin' Rock Records. Still Rockin' Around the Clock; the latter version acknowledges the song's influence on "Rock Around the Clock" by segueing into the final verse of the latter song. It was also covered and released by Reverend Horton Heat in 1996 on his album It's Martini Time.

== Cover versions ==
The 1952 Bill Haley version with a different arrangement and new lyrics was covered by Ralph Marterie and Lola Ameche on Mercury Records in 1952. The Wild Angels recorded the Bill Haley version in 1979. Billy Swan and Reverend Horton Heat have also performed and recorded the Bill Haley version in 1996.

== Sources ==
- Jim Dawson, Rock Around the Clock: The Record That Started the Rock Revolution! (Backbeat Books, 2005).
- John W. Haley and John von Hoelle, Sound and Glory (Dyne-American, 1990).
