= Doc Bagby =

Musician from USA

Harry "Doc" Bagby
- Born: Harry Camilus Bagby; August 1, 1917; Philadelphia, Pennsylvania, U.S.
- Died: September 3, 1970 (aged 53); Manhattan, New York City, U.S.
- Occupations: Musician; Producer; Band leader
- Spouse: Barbara Kemp (née Barbara Ward)

Harry "Doc" Bagby (né Harry Camilus Bagby) was an American studio musician who played piano and organ, and backed many artists in pop and jazz. He played a major part in the music scene from the late 1940s to the late 1960s. He was also a bandleader and solo artist in his own right. He released many singles throughout his career. He is also the co-composer of the hit song "Rock the Joint" which has been recorded by Jimmy Preston and Bill Haley.

== Background ==
During the 1930s while still a teenager he played at many house parties and became a requested musician. During the 1940s he started up his own orchestra which lasted until he was drafted into military service. Post 1945, he managed a record store and soon after was working for Gotham Records. The roles he had for the label were music adviser, talent scout and A&R man. As its music director he produced numerous records.

== Career ==
=== 1950s ===
Prior to coming on board as a staff member for Gotham Records, Bagby added his piano and organ to recording sessions for the label. One singer that Bagby and his group backed on a few recordings was Doris Browne. In 1953, Bagby and his group backed her on single "Oh Baby" bw Please Believe Me" which was released on Gotham G-290. He also backed her on her single, "Until The End Of Time" bw "Why Don't You Love Me Now, Now, Now?" Gotham G-296, and another recording "The Game Of Love" bw "My Cherie" which was released on Gotham G-7298 as a 45.

In 1957, he released the album, Honky Tonk in Silk on the Epic label. It was reported in Billboard that both the album and the single, "Dumplin's" b/w "Sylvia's Callin'" which was released on the Okeh label were standout sellers.

=== 1960s ===
In 1964, his single "Rubberneck" bw "Cornbread" was released on the Vim label, cat#519. He released many other singles on an assortment of labels.

== Producer ==
Among the recordings he produced were "I Got A Gal" bw "Bewitched" for The Mowhawks which was released on Val-Ue 211 in 1960, and Davenport Sisters with their single, "I Was Teasin'" bw "Our Summer Vacation Is Over", released on Vida DV 0108 in 1963.

== Family ==
He was married to Barbara Kemp (née; Barbara Ward; 1919–2009), who collaborated with him in songwriting.

== Death ==
Bagby died on September 3, 1970, following a short illness.
