= It's Martini Time =

Studio album by The Reverend Horton Heat
- Released: July 2, 1996
- Studio: Crystal Clear Studios, Dallas, Texas and The Village Recorder, Los Angeles, California
- Genre: Rockabilly; rock and roll; country
- Length: 45:13
- Label: Interscope
- Producer: Thom Panunzio

The Reverend Horton Heat chronology
Liquor in the Front (1994)	It's Martini Time (1996)	Space Heater (1998)

Professional ratings
Review scores
Source	Rating
AllMusic	link
Robert Christgau	(dud)
CMJ	(favorable)

It's Martini Time is the fourth album by The Reverend Horton Heat. It was released by Interscope Records in July 1996. It's Martini Time is the first Reverend Horton Heat album to feature Scott Churilla on drums, following Taz Bentley's departure from the band in 1994. It is also the first Reverend Horton Heat album to chart on the Billboard 200, reaching number 165 (the second highest position of a Reverend Horton Heat album on that chart).

"Rock the Joint" is the 1952 Bill Haley version with new lyrics and a different arrangement than the 1949 Jimmy Preston recording.

The song "Big Red Rocket of Love" appears in the film Modern Vampires and in the video game MotorStorm on PlayStation 3.

== Track listing ==
All songs written by Jim Heath except as noted.

1. "Big Red Rocket of Love" – 3:04
2. "Slow" – 4:23
3. "It's Martini Time" – 3:14
4. "Generation Why" – 2:46
5. "Slingshot" (Heath/Wallace/Churilla) – 3:07
6. "Time to Pray" – 2:40
7. "Crooked Cigarette" – 2:54
8. "Rock the Joint" (Crafton/Keene/Bagby) – 2:04
9. "Cowboy Love" – 2:41
10. "Now, Right Now" – 2:39
11. "Spell On Me" – 3:18
12. "Or Is It Just Me" – 5:30
13. "Forbidden Jungle" – 2:18
14. "That's Showbiz" – 4:35

back cover

== Personnel ==
- Jim "Reverend Horton" Heath - vocals, guitar
- Jimbo Wallace - upright bass, fiddle, vocals
- Scott Churilla - drums, vocals, percussion
- Tim Alexander - piano, organ, and accordion
- Dan Phillips - steel guitar
- Billy Pitman - guitar
- Jim Lehnert - tenor sax, baritone sax
- Gary Sweet - trumpet
- Erik Swanson - trombone
- Thom Panunzio - producer, engineer, mixing (on "Crooked Cigarette", "Rock The Joint", "Cowboy Love", "Or Is It Just Me", and "That's Showbiz")
- Keith Rust - assistant engineer, mixing (on "It's Martini Time", "Now, Right Now", "Spell On Me", and "Forbidden Jungle")
- Terry Slemmons - assistant engineer
- David Nottingham - assistant mixer
- Chris Shaw - mixing (on "Big Red Rocket of Love", "Slow", "Generation Why", "Slingshot", and "Time To Pray")
- Robert Vosgien - mastering
- Tony Ferguson - A&R
- Dennis Williams - crew
- David Adriance - crew
- Blair Campbell - crew
- Allan Nassau - crew
- Karma Cheema - crew
- Doc Williamson - crew
- Scott Weiss - management
- Unleashed - art direction
- Jennifer Broussard - photography
- Marina Chavez - photography
- Richard Lee Smith, Jr. - additional illustration

== Charts ==
Chart (1996)	Peak position
US Billboard 200	165
US Heatseekers (Billboard)	9
