= The Reverend Horton Heat =

American psychobilly trio

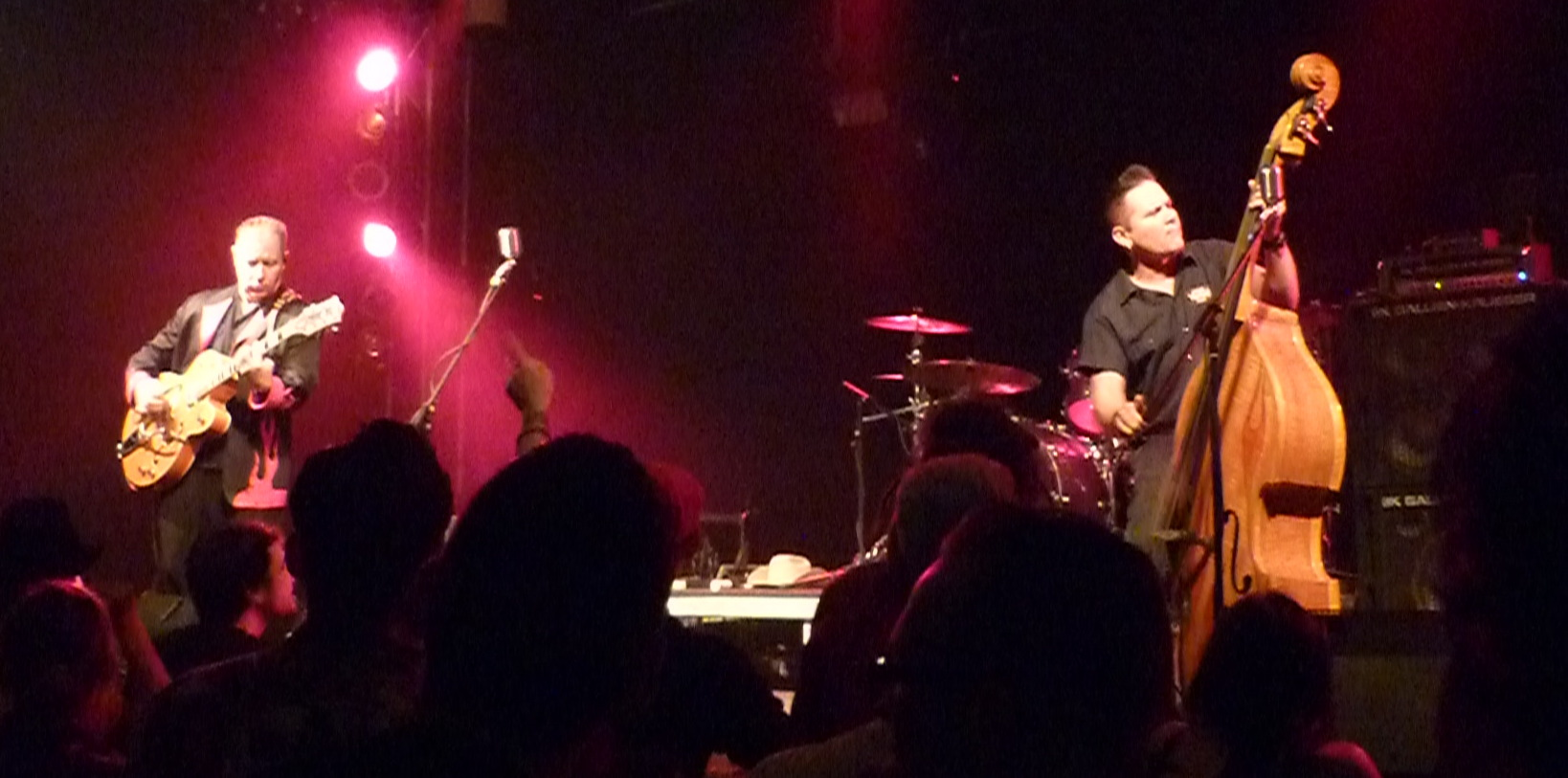
- The Reverend Horton Heat performing in 2010 at the Essigfabrik in Cologne, Germany

Background information
- Origin: Dallas, Texas U.S.
- Genres: Psychobilly; rockabilly
- Years active: 1985–present
- Labels: Fun-Guy; Sub Pop; Interscope; Time Bomb; Artemis; Yep Roc; Victory
- Members: Jim Heath; Jimbo Wallace; Jonathan Jeter
- Past members: Jack Barton; Bobby Baranowski; Kyle Thomas; Patrick "Taz" Bentley; Paul Simmons; Scott Churilla; Matt Jordan; Diego Randall; Arjuna "RJ" Contreras
- Website: reverendhortonheat.com

The Reverend Horton Heat is the stage name of American musician James C. Heath (born 1959) as well as the name of his psychobilly trio from Dallas. Heath is a singer, songwriter, and guitarist. A reviewer for the magazine Prick called Heath the "godfather of modern rockabilly and psychobilly".

The group formed in 1986, playing its first gigs in Dallas' Deep Ellum neighborhood. The core members are Jim "Reverend Horton" Heath on guitars and lead vocals, and Jimbo Wallace on the upright bass. The band signed to Victory Records in 2012, and released its 12th studio album, Whole New Life, on November 30, 2018.

The band plays rock and roll with influences from 1950s country music, surf music, punk, big band, swing, and rockabilly standards.

== Early career ==
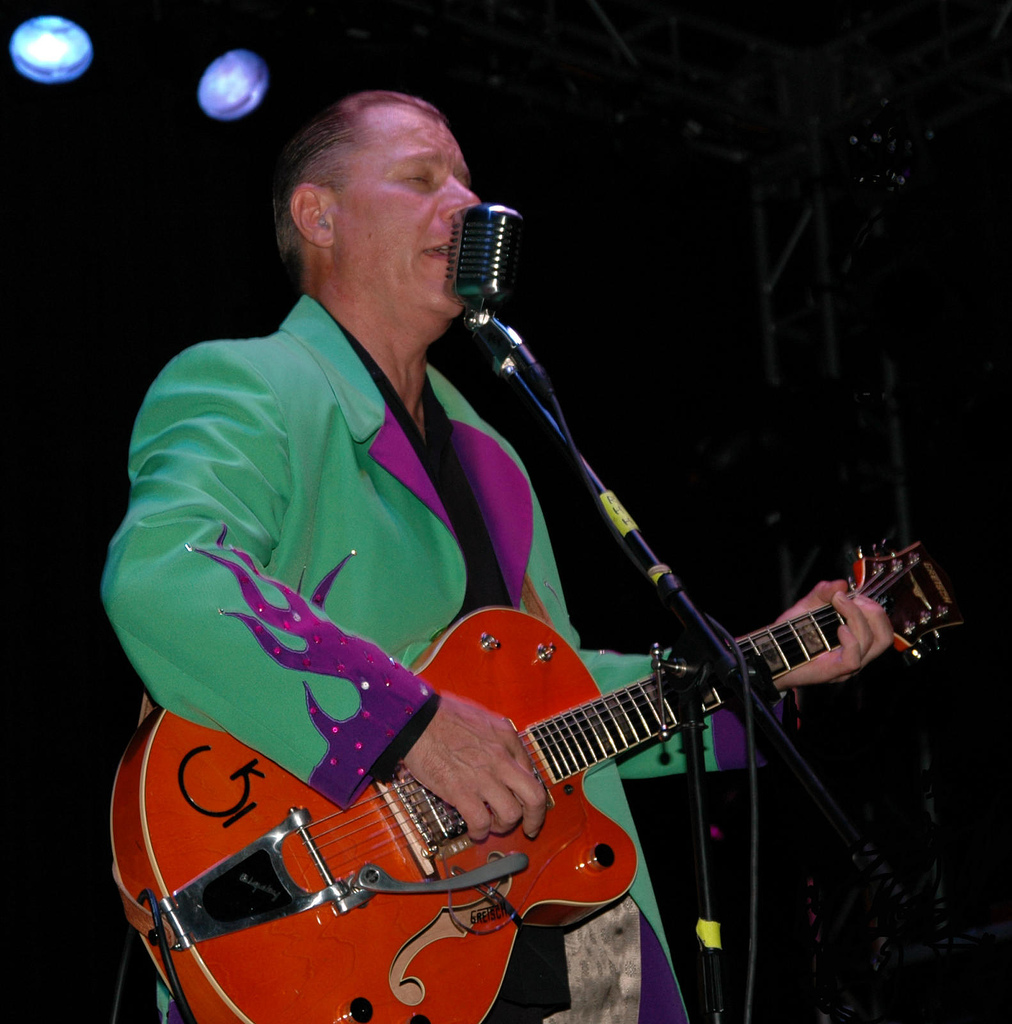
Heath performing at the Granada Theater in Dallas, September 2006

Heath was born in Corpus Christi, Texas, where he grew up with an appreciation of rock, electric blues and rockabilly. He was influenced by country music artists including Junior Brown, Willie Nelson, and Merle Travis. He began his career played in local bands until 1985 when he established the Reverend Horton Heat, based on a moniker bestowed by the owner of the Deep Ellum nightclub where he played.

Hiring bassist Jimbo Wallace and drummer Taz Bentley in 1989, the Reverend Horton Heat were signed by Sub Pop and recorded their debut album, Smoke 'Em If You Got 'Em (1990), at Reciprocal Recording in Seattle and Crystal Clear in Dallas. For their next album, The Full-Custom Gospel Sounds of the Reverend Horton Heat (1993), the band recorded with Gibby Haynes of the Butthole Surfers producing at Ardent Studios in Memphis, Tennessee.

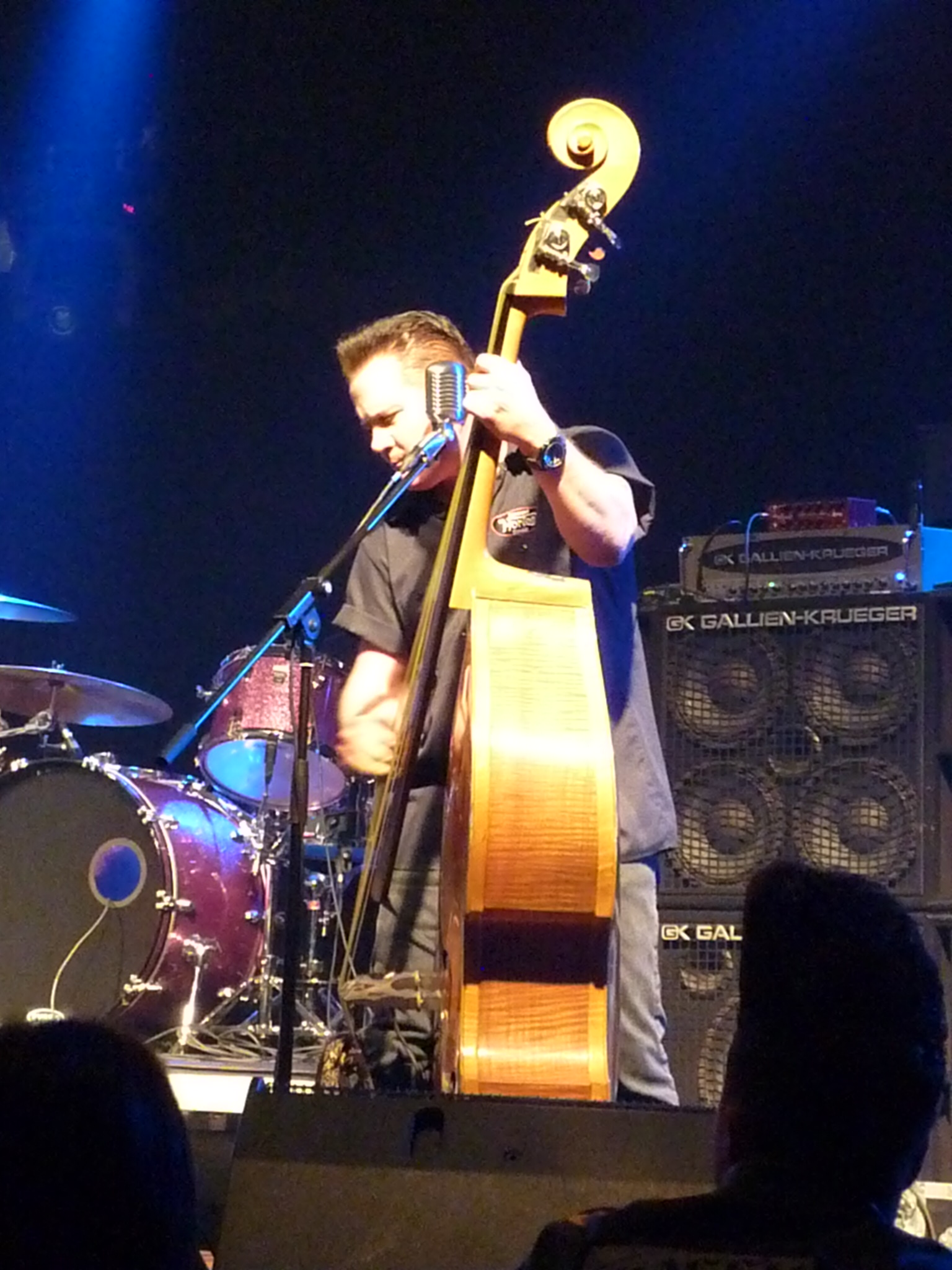
Jimbo Wallace uses a slap bass technique, performing at the Essigfabrik in Cologne, March 2010

After the success of their first two albums, the Reverend Horton Heat signed a deal with Interscope Records to co-release the band's third album, Liquor in the Front (1994), with Sub Pop. Al Jourgensen of Ministry produced the album.

== Chart success ==
Scott Churilla replaced Bentley as drummer in the mid-1990s, and the band released It's Martini Time in 1996. The album brought the band its first Billboard chart success, reaching number 165 on the Billboard 200. The band covered the boogie standard "Rock the Joint", and the song "It's Martini Time" was a minor hit. Later that year, Heath brought his street preacher style to the television series Homicide: Life on the Street on NBC, and he appeared on The Drew Carey Show on ABC in 1997. The band performed on the R.O.A.R. Tour in 1997. The Reverend Horton Heat would release their final Interscope album, Space Heater (1998)

Their sixth album, Spend a Night in the Box (2000), was released through Time Bomb Recordings, with Paul Leary producing. The style was a return to straight-ahead rockabilly songs similar to their first two albums. The album rose through CMJ's charts to peak at number 2 in May. The song "Like a Rocket" was the theme for the 2002 Daytona 500 autosports race. The band featured the song on their seventh album, Lucky 7.

Victory Records signed Reverend Horton Heat in 2012, and Scott Churilla returned to the band as drummer, playing for the next five years. An album titled Rev was released on January 21, 2014. A YouTube video for a single on the album, "Let Me Teach You How to Eat," preceded the album on November 12, 2013. Rev rose to number 111 on the Billboard 200, becoming the band's highest-charting album. The band toured as the opening act for Motörhead, and recorded rock and roll songs with Motörhead's Lemmy Kilmister, though the tapes are unreleased. Reverend Horton Heat also backed a number of other artists including Unknown Hinson, Jello Biafra, and Deke Dickerson. In 2017, drummer Churilla was replaced by Arjuna "R.J." Contreras, formerly of the band Eleven Hundred Springs. Matt Jordan of West Virginia joined the band playing piano and organ as well as supporting vocals. They released the album Whole New Life in 2018.

In 2021, Heath and Wallace teamed with drummer Slim Jim Phantom from the Stray Cats to form a side project: The Jimbos. The trio was set to release a live album called Live In Houston on December 22, 2023.

== Commercial appearances ==
"Psychobilly Freakout", and later "Wiggle Stick", were both featured in video segments on the show Beavis and Butt-Head. The song "I Can't Surf" was part of the soundtrack of the video game Tony Hawk's Pro Skater 3, published in 2001. “In Your Wildest Dreams” was used in the NBC drama Homicide: Life on the Street, episode “Full Moon” (season 4, episode 17, aired April 5, 1996), in which Reverend Horton Heat appears. "Psychobilly Freakout" was used on a commercial for Buell American Motorcycles and a slightly altered version was featured in the game Guitar Hero II and later on Guitar Hero Smash Hits. Their song "Baddest of the Bad" is featured on the soundtrack to Tony Hawk's Proving Ground. The 1997 video game Redneck Rampage also includes two of their songs, "Wiggle Stick" and "Nurture My Pig!". The song "Big Red Rocket of Love" is featured in the video games The Sims 3, MotorStorm and Need for Speed: The Run, and a slightly altered version of the song was featured in a 1999 television commercial for the Mazda Miata. The song "Pride of San Jacinto" is featured on the video game Hot Wheels Turbo Racing. The song "Let Me Teach You How to Eat" was featured in a 2017 Subway commercial. The song "Mad, Mad Heart" is featured in the video game Far Cry 5. The song "Scenery Going By" is featured in the Route 66 add-on of the game Trials Rising. The band appeared in the film "Love and a .45" performing the song "Loaded Gun". In 2025, at the request of actor Billy Bob Thornton, the band wrote the song "I Found Blue" for the Paramount+ television series, Landman. The song appears in the series and also on the soundtrack for the show.

== Equipment ==
Heath has a signature guitar from Gretsch, the 6120RHH. One of his favorite vintage guitars is a 1954 Gibson ES-175, which he rarely plays on the road since its wiring buzzes in certain venues. His favorite amplifier was the Fender Super Reverb but is now the Gretsch Executive.

== Band members ==
=== Current members ===
- Jim Heath – guitars, vocals (1985–present)
- Jimbo Wallace – upright bass (1989–present)
- Jonathan Jeter – drums (2020–present)

=== Former members ===
- "Swingin'" Jack Barton – upright bass (1985–1989)
- Bobby Baranowski – drums (1985–1989)
- Kyle Thomas – drums (1989)
- Patrick "Taz" Bentley – drums (1989–1994)
- Tim Alexander – piano, keyboards (1996– Jun. 2017)
- Paul Simmons – drums (2006–2012)
- Scott Churilla – drums (1995–2006, 2012–2017)
- Matt Jordan – piano (Sep. 2017– Feb. 2019)
- Arjuna “RJ” Contreras – drums (2017-2020)

== Discography ==
=== Studio albums ===
Year	Album details	Peak chart positions		
Year	Album details	US	US Heat	US Indie
1990	Smoke 'Em If You Got 'Em: Release date: November 1, 1990; Label: Sub Pop	—	—	—
1993	The Full-Custom Gospel Sounds of the Reverend Horton Heat: Release date: April 20, 1993; Label: Sub Pop	—	—	—
1994	Liquor in the Front: Release date: July 5, 1994; Label: Sub Pop/Interscope Records	—	18	—
1996	It's Martini Time: Release date: July 2, 1996; Label: Interscope Records	165	9	—
1998	Space Heater: Release date: March 24, 1998; Label: Interscope Records	187	14	—
2000	Spend a Night in the Box: Release date: March 21, 2000; Label: Time Bomb Recordings	—	23	—
2002	Lucky 7: Release date: February 26, 2002; Label: Artemis Records	—	—	15
2004	Revival: Release date: June 29, 2004; Label: Yep Roc Records	—	34	24
2005	We Three Kings: Release date: October 4, 2005; Label: Yep Roc Records	—	—	—
2009	Laughin' & Cryin' with the Reverend Horton Heat: Release date: September 1, 2009; Label: Yep Roc Records	—	14	44
2014	Rev: Release date: January 21, 2014; Label: Victory Records	111	2	26
2018	Whole New Life: Release date: November 30, 2018; Label: Victory Records	—	4	19
2023	Roots of the Rev (Volume One): Release date: March 1, 2023; Label: Fun-Guy Records	—	—	—
"—" denotes releases that did not chart

=== Collections ===
- Holy Roller: 24 Hits (Sub Pop, 1999)
- 20th Century Masters – The Millennium Collection: The Best of The Reverend Horton Heat (Interscope, 2006)
- 25 To Life [live] (Yep Roc, 2012)
- Live in Houston [Live] (Cleopatra Records, Inc., 2024)

=== Singles ===
- "Big Little Baby" (1988)
- "Psychobilly Freakout" (1990)
- "400 Bucks / Caliénte" (split with The Supersuckers) (1994)
- "One Time for Me" (1994) No. 40 Alternative songs
- "Lie Detector" (1998)
- "King" (1999)
- "It Was a Very Good Year" (2000)
- "Let Me Teach You How to Eat" (2013)
- "It's a Rave Up!/Beer, Write This Song" (2015)
- "Hardscrabble Woman/Lying to Myself" (2016)

=== DVDs ===
- Live and In Color (2003)
- Reverend Horton Heat: Revival (2004)

=== Soundtracks ===
Film

- Love and a .45 – "The Devil's Chasing Me" (1994)
- Ace Ventura: When Nature Calls – "Watusi Rodeo" (1995)
- Bio-Dome – "Psychobilly Freakout" (1996)
- Free Willy 3: The Rescue – "Big Sky" (1997)
- Major League: Back to the Minors – "Baby I'm Drunk" (1998)
- The Flintstones in Viva Rock Vegas – "Rock the Joint" (2000)
- Auto Focus – "Real Gone Lover" (2002)

Television

- Homicide: Life on the Street (episode #4.17 "Full Moon") – "In Your Wildest Dreams" (1996)
- Cleveland Rocks! Music from The Drew Carey Show – "Now, Right Now" (1998)
- Dexter: New Blood (episode #8 "Unfair Game") – "Baddest of the Bad" (2021)
- Landman – "I Found Blue" (2025)

Video games

- Redneck Rampage – "Nurture My Pig" and "Wiggle Stick" (1997)
- Space Bunnies Must Die! – "In Your Wildest Dreams" (1998)
- Hot Wheels Turbo Racing – "Pride of San Jacinto" (1999)
- Tony Hawk's Pro Skater 3 – "I Can't Surf" (2001)
- Guitar Hero II – "Psychobilly Freakout" (2006)
- MotorStorm – "Big Red Rocket of Love" (2007)
- Tony Hawk's Proving Ground – "Baddest of the Bad" (2007)
- The Sims 3 Fast Lane Stuff – "Big Red Rocket of Love" (2010)
- Need for Speed: The Run – "Big Red Rocket of Love" (2011)
- Steep – "Chasing Rainbows" (2016)

=== Film appearances ===
- Love and a .45 (1994) "Loaded Gun" was performed by the Reverend Horton Heat in the film, but does not appear on the soundtrack album.

=== Collaborations ===
- RevOrganDrum (Yep Roc, 2007)

== See also ==
- List of psychobilly bands
