= Revival (Reverend Horton Heat album) =

Studio album by The Reverend Horton Heat
- Released: June 29, 2004
- Studio: Last Beat Studios, Dallas, Texas
- Genre: Rock
- Length: 46:00
- Label: Yep Roc
- Producer: Reverend Horton Heat, Ed Stasium, Dave Allen

The Reverend Horton Heat chronology
| Lucky 7 (2002) | Revival (2004) | We Three Kings: Christmas Favorites (2005) |

Professional ratings
Review scores
| Source | Rating |
|---|---|
| AllMusic | 3.5/5 stars |

Revival is The Reverend Horton Heat's eighth studio album.

== Track listing ==
All tracks are written by Jim Heath.

| No. | Title | Length |
|---|---|---|
| 1. | "The Happy Camper" | 2:34 |
| 2. | "Revival" | 4:14 |
| 3. | "Callin’ In Twisted" | 2:33 |
| 4. | "If It Ain’t Got Rhythm" | 2:40 |
| 5. | "New York City Girls" | 2:53 |
| 6. | "Indigo Friends" | 3:55 |
| 7. | "Someone In Heaven" | 3:36 |
| 8. | "Octopus Mode" | 2:52 |
| 9. | "Party Mad" | 2:41 |
| 10. | "Honky Tonk Girl" | 3:10 |
| 11. | "Lonesome Man" | 3:27 |
| 12. | "I’m Your Pet Rock" | 4:08 |
| 13. | "Rumble Strip" | 2:39 |
| 14. | "We Belong Forever" | 3:15 |
| 15. | "Goin’ Back Home" | 1:23 |

== Personnel ==
- Jim "Reverend Horton" Heath - vocals, guitar
- Jimbo Wallace - upright bass
- Scott Churilla - drums
- Tim Alexander - piano on "Party Mad"
- Ed Stasium - producer, mixer
- Dave Allen - producer, engineer
- Paul Williams - engineer
- Nick Wagner - artwork
- Tom Blackmar - artwork
- Mary Gunn - graphic design
- Keith Martin - photography
- Bobby Dunavin - guitar tech
