= Holy Roller (album) =

1999 compilation album by the Reverend Horton Heat

Compilation album by The Reverend Horton Heat
- Released: April 20, 1999
- Studio: Dallas Sound Labs, Dallas, Texas
- Genre: Psychobilly
- Length: 70:58
- Label: Sub Pop
- Producer: Gibby Haynes, Al Jourgensen, Thom Panunzio, Ed Stasium, Jim Heath

The Reverend Horton Heat chronology
Space Heater (1998)	Holy Roller (1999)	Spend a Night in the Box (2000)

Professional ratings
Review scores
Source	Rating
AllMusic	link

Holy Roller is a retrospective compilation by The Reverend Horton Heat that was released by Sub Pop in April 1999, shortly after the band left Interscope Records amidst the label mergers of the late 1990s.

== Track listing ==
All songs written by Jim Heath except as noted.

1. "Big Sky" – 3:07
2. "Baddest of the Bad" – 2:27
3. "Wiggle Stick" – 3:00
4. "Big Red Rocket of Love" – 3:04
5. "Bales of Cocaine" – 2:11
6. "Bath-Water Blues" – 2:06
7. "Lie Detector" – 3:25
8. "400 Bucks" – 3:09
9. "Marijuana" (Heath/Wallace) – 4:49
10. "It's Martini Time" – 3:15
11. "Baby I'm Drunk" – 3:11
12. "Where in the Hell Did You Go With My Toothbrush?" – 3:35
13. "Bad Reputation" (Heath/Wallace) – 2:24
14. "One Time for Me" – 3:29
15. "Now, Right Now" – 2:39
16. "Slow" – 4:23
17. "Love Whip" – 3:43
18. "Jimbo Song" (Heath/Wallace) – 2:21
19. "Big Little Baby" – 2:31
20. "Cowboy Love" – 2:41
21. "In Your Wildest Dreams" (Heath/Wallace) – 2:59
22. "Eat Steak" – 2:33
23. "Folsom Prison Blues" (Cash) – 2:42
24. "The Entertainer" (Joplin) – 1:14

Tracks 6 and 23 were previously unreleased.

== Personnel ==
- Jim "Reverend Horton" Heath - guitars, vocals, drums (on 24), producer, recording, and mixing (on 6 and 23)
- Jimbo Wallace - upright bass, vocals
- Scott Churilla - drums (on 4, 6, 7, 10, 11, 15, 16, 18, 20 and 23), vocals, percussion
- Patrick "Taz" Bentley - drums (on 1–3, 5, 8, 9, 12–14, 17, 19, 21 and 22), piano (on 24)
- Keith Rust - recording (on 9, 13, 17, and 22), mixing (on 9, 10, 13, 15, 17, and 22), engineering (on 9, 13, 17, and 22), assistant engineer (on 1, 2, 4, 10, 14–16, 20, 21, and 24)
- Gibby Haynes - producer (on 3, 5, 8, and 19)
- Erik Flettrich - engineer (on 3, 5, 8, and 19)
- Al Jourgensen - producer (on 1, 2, 14, 21 and 24), mixing (on 24)
- Steve Spapperi - engineer (on 1, 2, 14, 21, and 24)
- Siavoch Ahmadaodeh - assistant engineer (on 1, 2, 14, 21 and 24)
- Thom Panunzio - mixing (on 1, 2, 14, 20 and 21), producer and engineer (on 4, 10, 15, 16 and 20)
- Terry Slemmons - assistant engineer (on 4, 10, 15, 16 and 20)
- Chris Shaw - mixing (on 4 and 16)
- David Nottingham - assistant mixer (on 20)
- Ed Stasium - producer, recorder, mixer (on 7, 11, 18)
- Phillip Green - assistant recorder (on 7, 11, 18)
- Marvin Hlavenka - assistant recorder (on 7, 11, 18)
- Junichi Murakawa - assistant mixer (on 7, 11, 18)
- Scott Weiss - management
