= We Three Kings (The Reverend Horton Heat album) =

We Three Kings: Christmas Favorites

Studio album by The Reverend Horton Heat
- Released: October 4, 2005
- Studio: Last Beat Studios, Dallas, Texas
- Genre: Rock; Christmas
- Length: 39:42
- Label: Yep Roc
- Producer: Paul Williams (recording and mixing), Dave Harris (mastering)

The Reverend Horton Heat chronology
Revival (2004)	We Three Kings: Christmas Favorites (2005)	20th Century Masters - The Millennium Collection: The Best of The Reverend Horton Heat (2006)

Professional ratings
Review scores
Source	Rating
AllMusic	3/5 stars

We Three Kings: Christmas Favorites is a Christmas album by The Reverend Horton Heat. It was released by Yep Roc Records in October 2005. The album features renditions of twelve popular Christmas songs. It also features one original track.

A limited edition Christmas ornament was included with copies of the album that were pre-ordered through the band's record label.

== Track listing ==
1. "Frosty the Snowman" (Nelson, Rollins) – 3:03
2. "Santa Bring My Baby Back (To Me)" (Demetrius, Schroeder) – 2:00
3. "Jingle Bells" (Pierpont) – 2:19
4. "Santa Claus Is Coming to Town" (Coots, Gillespie) – 3:01
5. "Silver Bells" (Evans, Livingston) – 3:47
6. "We Three Kings" (John Henry Hopkins) – 3:53
7. "Santa Looked a Lot Like Daddy" (Owens, Rich) – 2:15
8. "Rudolph the Red Nosed Reindeer" (Marks) – 3:08
9. "Santa on the Roof" (Heath) – 2:47
10. "What Child Is This" (Traditional) – 4:11
11. "Pretty Paper" (Nelson) – 3:06
12. "Winter Wonderland" (Bernard, Smith) – 3:23
13. "Run Rudolph Run" (Broadie, Marks) – 2:49

== Personnel ==
- Jim Heath (aka Rev. Horton Heat) - vocals, guitar
- Jimbo Wallace - upright bass
- Scott Churilla - drums
- Tim Alexander - arrangement (tracks 1, 3, 4, 5, 6, 8, 10, and 12)
- Paul Williams - recording and mixing
- Dave Harris - mastering
- Mary Gunn - art direction and graphic design
