= Liquor in the Front =

Studio album by The Reverend Horton Heat
- Released: July 5, 1994
- Studio: Crystal Clear Studios, Dallas, Texas
- Genre: Rockabilly, psychobilly
- Length: 35:42
- Label: Sub Pop / Interscope
- Producer: Al Jourgensen

The Reverend Horton Heat chronology
The Full-Custom Gospel Sounds of the Reverend Horton Heat (1993)	Liquor in the Front (1994)	It's Martini Time (1996)

Professional ratings
Review scores
Source	Rating
AllMusic	3/5 stars
CMJ	favorable
Kerrang!	4/5 stars
The Village Voice	B−

Liquor in the Front is the third album by Reverend Horton Heat. It was jointly released by Sub Pop and Interscope Records in July 1994. Al Jourgensen of Ministry fame produced the album. The album continues the band's guitar-heavy rockabilly style flavored with punk rock, surf rock and country elements. The back cover album art displays the subtitle "Poker in the Rear".

The song "In Your Wildest Dreams" (along with "The Reverend" himself) was featured in the TV shows Homicide: Life on the Street and Midnight, Texas. "I Can't Surf" appeared in Tony Hawk's Pro Skater 3. "Baddest of the Bad" was in Tony Hawk's Proving Ground and Dexter: New Blood. The film Free Willy 3: The Rescue featured "Big Sky".

== Track listing ==
All songs were written by Jim Heath except as noted.

1. "Big Sky" – 3:07
2. "Baddest of the Bad" – 2:27
3. "One Time for Me" – 3:30
4. "Five-O Ford" – 2:29
5. "In Your Wildest Dreams" (Heath/Wallace) – 2:58
6. "Yeah, Right" – 2:44
7. "Crusin' for a Bruisin'" – 3:20
8. "I Could Get Used to It" – 1:58
9. "Liquor, Beer & Wine" (Heath/Livingston) – 3:25
10. "I Can't Surf" (Heath/Wallace/Bentley) – 2:41
11. "Jezebel" (Shanklin) – 3:11
12. "Rockin' Dog" – 2:38
13. "The Entertainer" (Joplin) – 1:14

== Personnel ==
- Jim "Reverend Horton" Heath – vocals, guitar
- Jimbo Wallace – upright bass
- Taz Bentley – drums
- Tim Alexander – keyboards, accordion
- Al Jourgensen – producer, pedal steel guitar, piano, vocals
- Siavoch Ahmadzadeh – assistant engineer
- Keith Rust – assistant engineer
- Jeff Lane – assistant mix engineer
- Barry Goldberg – assistant mix engineer
- Eddy Schreyer – mastering
- Kim Holt – art direction + design
- Michael Lavine – band photos
- Mosquito – cartoon illustrations

== Chart positions ==
=== Album ===
Year	Album	Chart	Position
1994	Liquor in the Front	Heatseekers	18

=== Singles ===
Year	Single	Chart	Position
1994	"One Time For Me"	Modern Rock Tracks	40
