= Lola Dee =

American singer (1928–2023)

Lorraine DeAngelis (July 9, 1928 – December 7, 2023), known professionally as Lola Dee, also known as Lola Ameche, was an American singer who recorded for the Mercury and Columbia labels in the 1950s and 1960s. At the age of 14, she was heard in an amateur contest and asked to audition for a network teen-aged show called Junior Junction. Aged 16, Dee was signed to a recording contract. She recorded over 60 sides, including the best seller "Only You (And You Alone)" (1955). Her popularity as a recording artist gave her the opportunity to tour with such stars as Bob Hope, Johnnie Ray, and Jimmy Durante in the 1950s and 1960s.

== Early life ==
Born in Chicago, Illinois, on July 9, 1928, Lola Dee grew up in Chicago's West Side communities. Her father Peter was a drummer, and she started singing before the age of 2, delighting her family. Her first public engagements were amateur shows, starting at the age of 9, with the support of her mother, Ida (née Amici). Lola had a brother, Carl, and a sister, Stella. Aged 14, Lola was heard on an amateur programme, and was asked to audition for the American Broadcasting Company's Junior Junction, a national show for teenagers based in Chicago with Dick York as Master of Ceremonies. Dee appeared on Chicago's WLS Barn Dance, and was referred to as "The Little Princess". That appearance led to three years as staff singer for ABC; during this time, she signed to a recording contract with Mercury.

== Recording career ==
On signing with Mercury Records, Dee changed her stage name to Lola Ameche, after her mother's maiden name, then to Lola Dee on the same label. She also worked under contract to Columbia Records and London Records as Lola Ameche, recording over 60 sides in total. Her version of "Only You (And You Alone)" reportedly sold half a million copies, despite not charting. Dee's Billboard hits were "Pretty Eyed Baby" (as vocalist with Al Trace's Orchestra, a No. 26 hit in 1951), "Hitsity Hotsity" (her highest-charting single, reaching No. 24 in 1951), "Padre" (reaching No. 25 in 1954) and "Paper Roses" (a No. 72 hit in 1955).

Dee also recorded the title song from the film Fire Down Below, and "Dahil Sa Iyo" with the Manila Symphony Orchestra. During her career, Dee performed worldwide and became a member of several tours which included such stars as Bob Hope, Johnnie Ray and Jimmy Durante. She toured clubs and theatres in Australia, the Far East, Mexico, the Philippines, the Caribbean, Japan, South America, Cuba and Canada. A two-CD, 58-track compilation of her recordings was released in June 2015 by Jasmine Records.

== Later career ==
Starting in 1965, and going into the 1980s, Dee performed at more intimate venues in nightclubs. She also continued to be a featured singer with WGN radio and television in Chicago. Her national career continued until 1978, and included annual appearances at the Illinois State Fair doing live broadcasts for WGN with Orion Samuelson from 1971 to 1978. Dee appeared as Klondike Kate, the first lady of Edmonton, Alberta, Canada, and performed on the Royal Caribbean International cruise line for three years. Dee limited her travel to care for her mother, who developed Alzheimer's disease. Dee's last two public performances were singing the national anthem on television for the Chicago Cubs and Chicago White Sox in 1978.

== Charity work ==
As a regional celebrity, Dee was Honorary Chairwoman of the Illinois chapter of the Amyotrophic Lateral Sclerosis (ALS) Foundation in 1978 and 1979, which brought in thousands of dollars for research into Lou Gehrig's Disease. Due to her mother's struggle with Alzheimer's disease, Dee has also worked in fundraising for that cause.

== Later life ==
In 1988, Dee became an Executive Concierge in Oak Brook, Illinois, to be near her mother. She was the top vote winner among Hilton Hotels & Resorts Honors-program guests in 2007, scoring nationally for satisfaction. The magazine Concierge Preferred appointed her to the advisory council from 2005 to 2013. She was a 2013 Inductee to the Chicago Concierge Hall of Fame.

== Personal life and death ==
Dee was married to Rudolph R. Valentino, not to be confused with the film star of the same name. She and Valentino had a son, Barry.

Lola Dee died in Hinsdale, Illinois on December 7, 2023, at the age of 95.

== Selected discography ==
Wing Label/Mercury Records (78 rpm)
1950 to 1953 as Lola Ameche

- "Don't Let the Stars Get in Your Eyes"
- "Hitsity, Hotsity" (with Al Trace & His Orchestra)
- "Josephine"
- "Rock the Joint"
- "Big Blue Eyes"
- "Piana Anina"
- "Ragtime Melody"
- "Copycat"
- "Walk Right In"

1953 to 1955 as Lola Dee

- "Takin' the Trains Out"
- "You're the One"
- "Padre"
- "Altar of Love"

Wing Label/Mercury Records (78 and 45 rpm) as Lola Dee
W 90004 "I Love You Stop" c/w "Cha Cha Cha" (1954)
W 90015 "Paper Roses" c/w "Only You (And You Alone)" (1955)
W 90035 "In the Year of Our Love" c/w "Hey Ba Ba Re Bop" (1955)
W 90052 "I'll Be Forever Loving You" c/w "Ma Petite" (1956)

Pretty Eyed Baby - The Complete Singles (Jasmine Records) (2015)
