= Slapping (music) =

Musical technique

Audio example of slap bass with drums

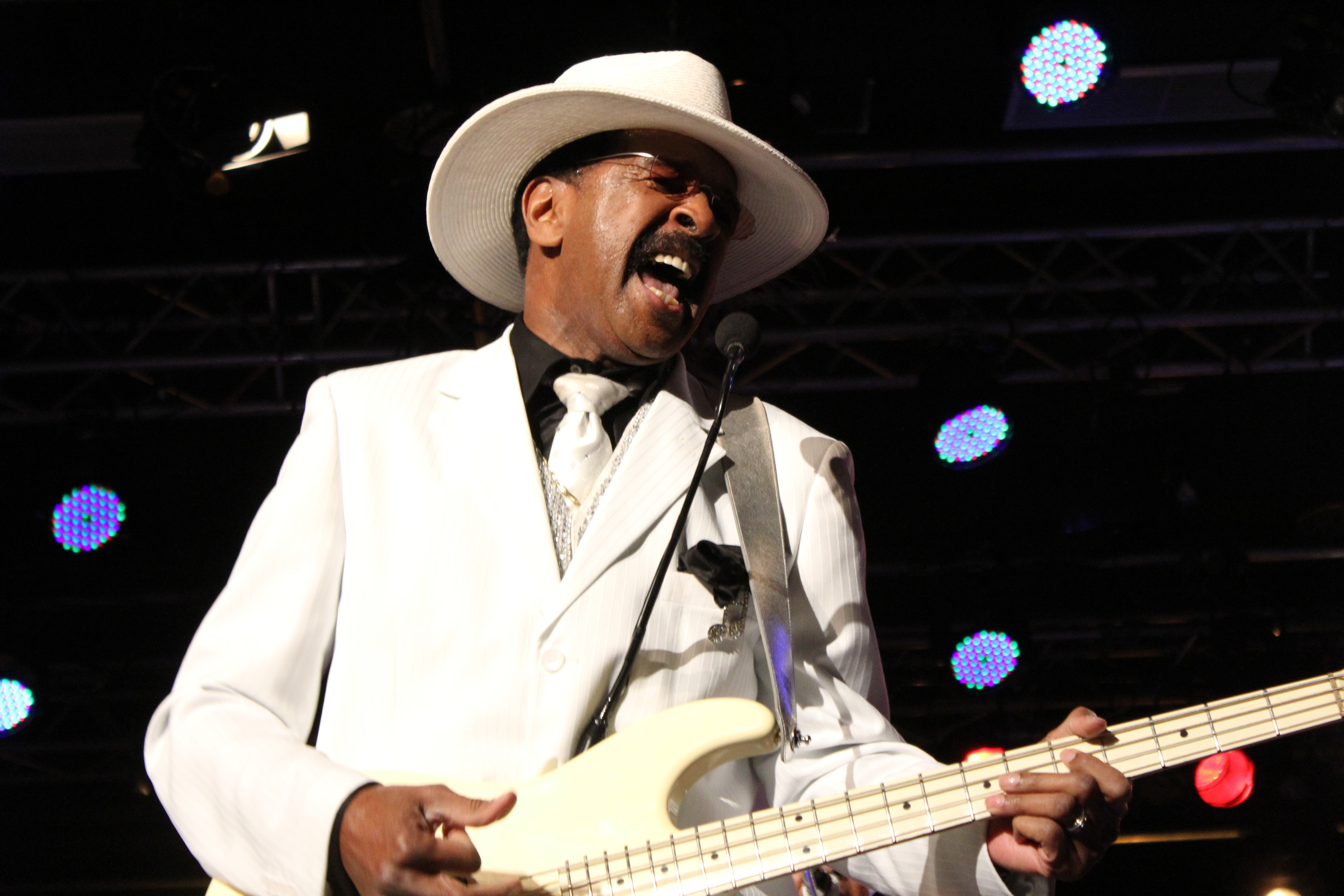
Bassist Larry Graham, widely regarded as the progenitor of modern slap bass

Demonstration of the slap technique on a 6-string bass

Slapping and popping are ways to produce percussive sounds on a stringed instrument. They are primarily used on the double bass or bass guitar. Slapping on bass guitar involves using the edge of one's knuckle, where it is particularly bony, to quickly strike the string against the fretboard. On bass guitars, this is commonly done with the thumb, while on double bass, the edge of the hand or index finger may be used. Popping refers to pulling the string away from the fretboard and quickly releasing it so it snaps back against the fretboard. On bass guitar, the two techniques are commonly used together in alternation, though either may be used separately.

== History ==
On the double bass, the technique was developed by jazz bands in New Orleans in the early 1900s, and later spread to other genres, including western swing, rockabilly, and other offshoots of those styles. On the bass guitar, the technique is widely credited to Larry Graham, an electric bassist playing with Sly and the Family Stone in the late 1960s. The technique quickly spread to the funk and disco genres.

Slapping is a technique also adopted by acoustic and electric fingerstyle guitarists. John Lennon is seen slapping his guitar in the first two measures of the song "Get Back" in Peter Jackson's documentary "The Beatles: Get Back".

== Double bass ==
On double bass it refers to the technique that is a more vigorous version of pizzicato, where the string is plucked so hard that when released it bounces off the finger board, making a distinctive sound. A percussive sound can also be made by smacking the strings with some or all of the fingers on the right hand in between the notes of a bassline, usually in time with the snare drum.

The earliest players of this technique in American music include Bill Johnson (1872–1972), Theodore "Steve" Brown (1890–1965), Wellman Braud (1891–1966), Pops Foster (1892–1969), and Chester Zardis (1900–1990).

Slap bass was used by Western Swing and Hillbilly Boogie musicians. It became an important component of an early form of rock and roll that combined blues and what was then called hillbilly music—a musical style now referred to as rockabilly. Bill Black, who played with Elvis Presley and Scotty Moore, was a well-known slap bass player. The technique inspired the George and Ira Gershwin song "Slap That Bass".

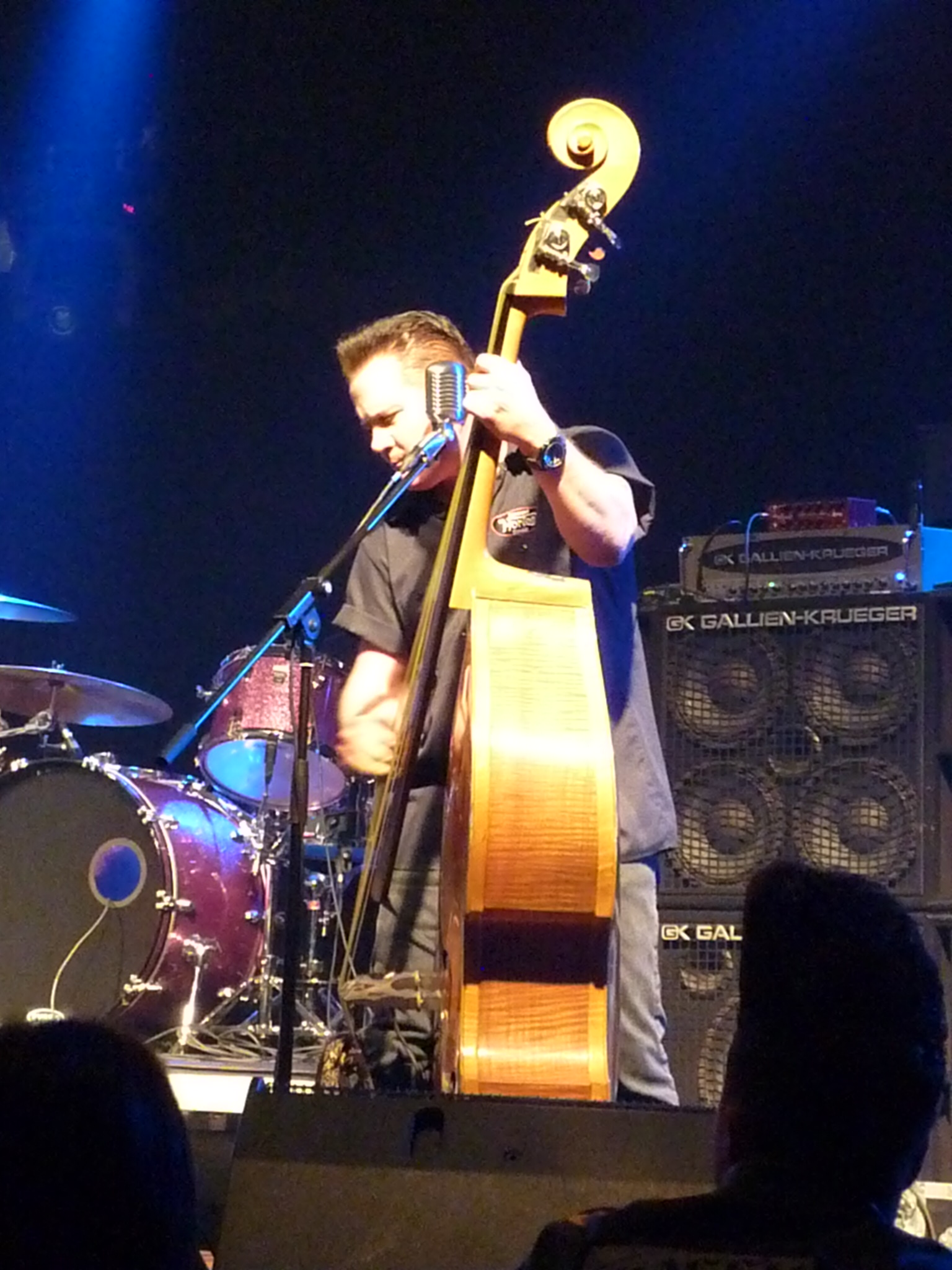
Jimbo Wallace from the Reverend Horton Heat is a slap bass performer

Slap bass continues to be used in the 21st century, as it is widely used by modern rockabilly and psychobilly band bassists, including Kim Nekroman (Nekromantix), Geoff Kresge (Tiger Army), Scott Owen (The Living End) and Jimbo Wallace (The Reverend Horton Heat). Kresge's rapid slapping ability is all the more remarkable given that for much of his career he was an electric bassist. The top rockabilly and psychobilly bassists have developed the ability to perform rapid triplet slaps at the same time as they play a walking bassline.

== Bass guitar ==
On bass guitar, slapping usually refers to a percussive playing technique most commonly used in funk, disco, soul, R&B, jazz, country music, rock, and many other genres. The style sounds much more percussive than regular plucking of notes with the soft part of the plucking hands fingers, and is also usually louder (although on an electric instrument, the volume can be adjusted with the volume knob or through compression), brighter, and more distinct than the sound of a bass guitar played with the usual plucking or pick techniques.

The slap sound comes from the combination of two elements: slapping, which involves striking the string with the side of the bony joint in the middle of the thumb, a harder surface than the pads of the fingers (used in plucked fingering); and intentionally allowing the vibrating string to come into contact with the metal frets, producing a "toney" or buzzing sound that is normally avoided in plucked/fingered bass.

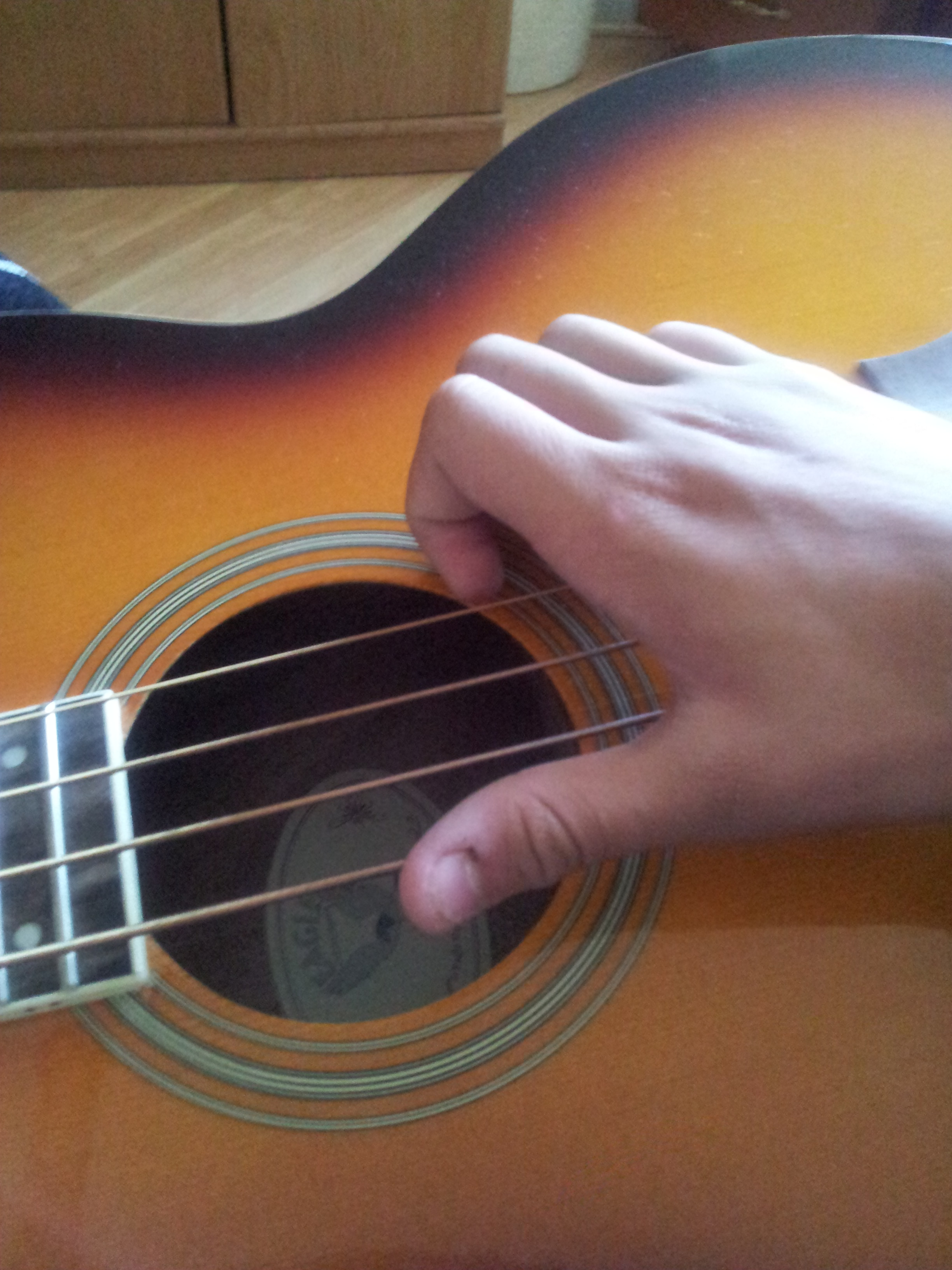
The typical position of the slapping hand

In the slap technique, the bassist replaces the usual plucking motion of the index and middle fingers with "slaps" and "pops". In the slap, the bassist uses the thumb to strike the strings (usually the lower E and A strings) near the base of the bass's neck. In the pop, the bassist will use the index or middle finger of the plucking hand to snap the strings (usually the higher D and G strings) away from the body of the bass, causing them to bounce off the fretboard; this produces a prominent buzzing tone with a sharp attack and more high-frequency vibrations than present in plucked bass.

The bassist can play many notes quickly by rotating the forearm, alternately slapping and popping: during the pop, the hand moves away from the fretboard, "winding up" or getting in position for the next slap. The slap and pop techniques are commonly used with pull-offs and hammer-ons with the fretting (usually left) hand, to further increase the rate at which notes may be played. Ghost notes, or notes played with the string damped, are also commonly played in slap bass to increase the percussive feel of the technique.

The invention of slap on electric bass is generally credited to funk bassist Larry Graham. Graham has stated in several interviews that he was trying to emulate the sound of a drum set before his band had found its drummer. Graham himself refers to the technique as "thumpin' and pluckin'".

== Variants ==
There are numerous variants of the slapping technique. Some bassists use other fingers of the strumming hand to achieve this sound, such as bassist Abraham Laboriel, Sr., who uses his thumb to pop the strings, and his other four fingers to slap the strings. Bassist Victor Wooten uses a double thump technique which is like a slap, but uses both sides of the thumb for all the strings, fast enough to produce the equivalent of a drumroll on the bass guitar.

Funk fingers invented by progressive rock bass player Tony Levin create a similar sound by using a hard surface to strike the strings and intentionally cause string contact with the fretboard. Spank bass developed from the slap and pop style and treats the electric bass as a percussion instrument, striking the strings above the pickups with an open palmed hand.

The slap technique bears some resemblance to tambour, a percussive technique used in flamenco and classical guitar, although the tonal quality produced in this technique is quite different from that of a slapped electric bass. Japanese musician Miyavi is well known for creating a unique slapping style of playing electric guitars. Tosin Abasi, guitarist for progressive metal band Animals as Leaders, is also known for a slapping and popping technique on electric guitar, which he uses for both melodic and percussive effect.
