= Hot Wheels Turbo Racing =

1999 video game

- European Nintendo 64 cover art featuring Twin Mill and Cat-A-Pult
- Developer: Stormfront Studios
- Publisher: Electronic Arts
- Series: Hot Wheels
- Platforms: Nintendo 64, PlayStation
- Release: PlayStation: NA: August 31, 1999; UK: October 22, 1999; Nintendo 64: NA: September 14, 1999; UK: November 5, 1999
- Genre: Racing
- Modes: Single-player, multiplayer

Hot Wheels Turbo Racing is a racing video game released for the Nintendo 64 and PlayStation in 1999. It features 40 cars based on the Hot Wheels series of toys. It also features Kyle Petty's 1999 NASCAR stock car, as it was sponsored by Hot Wheels. The game features music from artists like Primus, Metallica, The Reverend Horton Heat and Mix Master Mike.

== Gameplay ==
Gameplay on the Nintendo 64

The focus of the game is racing one of a selection of vehicles through various themed race tracks. Secret tracks can be unlocked by winning races and new cars can be used by finding 'Mystery Car' bonuses hidden in each track. Six vehicles participate in each race. The game features a total of 40 playable vehicles. Stunts can be executed by holding the directional pad or analog stick in certain directions while in mid-air to add to the turbo meter for increased speed.

As seen in the hint screens, using the controller to perform various stunts from jumping-off points gains 'Turbos' which allow short bursts of speed. The car in use will take damage based on running into obstacles or other cars. Power-up icons found around the track give various performance enhancements.

== Reception ==
Reception

Aggregate score
Aggregator	Score	
Aggregator	N64	PS
GameRankings	71%	73%

Review scores
Publication	Score	
Publication	N64	PS
AllGame	3/5	4/5
CNET Gamecenter	N/A	8/10
Electronic Gaming Monthly	7.375/10 (Note: Four critics of Electronic Gaming Monthly gave the Nintendo 64 version each a score of 7.5/10, 8.5/10, 6.5/10, and 7/10.)	7.5/10
Game Informer	7/10	6.25/10
GameFan	70%	(G.N.) 85% 75% (Note: In GameFan's viewpoint of the PlayStation version, three critics gave it each a score of 67, 88, and 70.)
GameRevolution	N/A	B
GameSpot	7.9/10	8/10
Hyper	71%	N/A
IGN	7.7/10	6.8/10
N64 Magazine	61%	N/A
Next Generation	3/5	N/A
Nintendo Power	7.3/10	N/A
Official U.S. PlayStation Magazine	N/A	2.5/5

Hot Wheels Turbo Racing received above-average reviews on both platforms according to video game review aggregator GameRankings.

Doug Trueman of NextGen said that the Nintendo 64 version was "all in all, a fun title and a great party game, but perhaps a bit childish for hardcore racing fans."

Scott McCall of AllGame called the Nintendo 64 version "somewhat fun and original to play", but criticized its "average" sound effects and "very limited and repetitive" songs, which he felt were of poor quality. McCall called the game "a little disappointing in the graphics department", writing that it "seems like a CD-ROM game that was ported to the cartridge format quickly and cheaply. It's noticeable because of the limited, muffled sound, the lackluster graphics, and the lack of a four-player mode." Joe Ottoson of AllGame wrote a positive review of the PlayStation version and praised its soundtrack, although he noted that the sound effects "aren't quite as high budget, but the screeching tires and colliding cars provide a convincing supplement to the action." Ottoson wrote that the game's vehicles "resemble their real-life counterparts and the game speeds along without any slowdown", while also stating that its race tracks "seem to stick with the toy stunt track origins of the subject matter by using an array of vibrant colors on the backgrounds. They often reminded me of something that had escaped from a Tim Burton movie with the prodigious usage of stripes and cheerful colors."

Levi Buchanan of GameFan praised the Nintendo 64 version for its "Good bands", but criticized the game itself as "Mediocre": "The game must have so few merits, that they need a professional soundtrack to add a bullet point to the list of features on the back of the box. [...] Nothing in Hot Wheels raises it above the level of average." Buchanan felt that the Hot Wheels license was the only difference separating the game from other racing games. Jeff Gerstmann of GameSpot praised both versions for their graphics and wrote that the game "captures the look and feel of those popular little cars and manages to deliver a surprisingly excellent gaming experience along the way. At first glance, it's easy to dismiss Hot Wheels Turbo Racing as just another racing game. [...] But the cars and tracks are what make it so different. [...] It's a shame that many will underestimate Hot Wheels Turbo Racing just because it's got the toy-car license attached to it. The driving is great, and the stunt aspect of the game gives it a skateboard-like feel. It's definitely poised to become a sleeper hit."

Uncle Dust of GamePro praised the Nintendo 64 version for its soundtrack in one review and wrote, "The graphics look much cleaner on the N64 than the PlayStation, with the accurately modeled cars looking less blocky. [...] While the N64 version looks better than the Playstation version, the controls are not as tight. The Playstation's dual analog sticks are more responsive than the cluttered default button arrangement on N64, which also offers a less precise analog stick for steering. But quibbling aside, the N64 offers solid controls for the cars." He wrote that one of the top attributes of the game "is how it perfectly integrates performing tricks with successful racing." (Note: GamePro gave the Nintendo 64 version three 4/5 scores for graphics, sound, and control, and 4.5/5 for fun factor in one review.) Boba Fatt said in another review, "If you've ever tossed a Hot Wheel car through the air and wondered what it'd be like to be inside during the ensuing crash, check out Hot Wheels Turbo Racing for the answer. One more eternal question has been answered by modern technology." (Note: GamePro gave the Nintendo 64 version three 4/5 scores for graphics, sound, and fun factor, and 3.5/5 for control in another review.)

Reviewing the PlayStation version in one review, Uncle Dust considered one of the game's best aspects to be its use of the console's DualShock controller, and wrote, "There are some mud spots that the game gets mired in. Although the 3D models of the cars are right on the money, they are somewhat blocky and the rolling, flipping, and twisting metal does tend to go on for longer than it should. Collisions with opposing racers have a sometimes unpredictable outcome, making the action very frustrating when trying to win the Hot Wheels Cup. Worst of all, though, is that there's no damage meter to clue you in when you're about to blow up. Nitpicking aside, Hot Wheels Turbo Racing does pulse-pounding fun like few other titles. EA makes perfect use of the Hot Wheels name, including the classic loops and car colliding track designs, to insure lots of repeat play-ability in this fun and fresh racer." (Note: GamePro gave the PlayStation version two 4/5 scores for graphics and sound, and two 4.5/5 scores for control and fun factor in one review.) In another review, Boba Fatt said that the same console version was "far from perfect, but it's one of the more exciting arcade-style racers on the market. If you've got greed for speed, check this title out!" (Note: GamePro gave the PlayStation version 3.5/5 for graphics, two 4/5 scores for sound and fun factor, and 3/5 for control in another review.)

GameRevolution, which felt that the game was best suited for young children, praised the PlayStation version for its soundtrack but called the graphics a "mixed bag": "The cars and tracks look pretty good and the frame rate is pretty fast, but the look of the tracks doesn't seem quite right. In my imagination, Hot Wheels would be raced on toy tracks through the back yard, on table tops, or in toy rooms. Instead, the tracks are a mix of real-life terrain, industrial areas and other random places. If the designers had truly wanted to capture the feel of racing little toy cars, they should've taken this into consideration and let you burn rubber in the kitchen. What we're left with is a game that tries to put toy cars into a quasi-real environment. There are plenty of jumps and loops, but their toy-like qualities clash with the natural environments. On the plus side, the cars look true to life and really bring back some memories."

Matt Casamassina of IGN praised the graphics of the Nintendo 64 version, writing that Stormfront Studios had "successfully translated the look of Hot Wheels plastic tracks into the world of polygons. Hot Wheels Turbo Racing features roads that glow bright red, stripe yellow and orange, green, blue -- everything but black, really. While these tracks are most definitely reminiscent of the toy courses they were inspired by, as a game we must admit that they still come off looking overly tacky and far too bright in appearance. [...] Because background graphics are of a much more realistic tone, the end effect is certainly unique, if not confusing. We end up with rainbow roads stretching through realistic environments. A bit odd to be sure, but it works. Vehicles, meanwhile, which are comprised of the classic Hot Wheels collection, come to life with solid polygon models and detailed textures. The colorful environments themselves, it must be said, are not overly detailed." Casamassina noted that the game had a "very polygon look", giving background objects and roads a "blocky appearance". Casamassina felt that the game looked outdated in comparison to other racing games of that time, and wrote that he preferred "the wide-open, go-anywhere racing environments and heavy car physics of the Rush series to Hot Wheels' seemingly weightless cars and sometimes confined 3D tracks. With that said, the title comes recommended as a good racer that's going to appeal to stunt-lovers and not simulation junkies."

Max Everingham of IGN praised the PlayStation version for its soundtrack and noted gameplay similarities to the San Francisco Rush games, which also incorporated high jumps and mid-air stunts; Everingham said that Hot Wheels Turbo Racing's version of this concept was "fun, but it's also really easy. The learning curve is short and the long-term play life is moderate. Taking cues from Beetle Adventure Racing, Hot Wheels is also packed with alternate courses and secrets. Here, it's still intriguing finding them all, but it doesn't feel as original or as compelling". Everingham called the graphics "a little too bright and in your face," and concluded, "If you wished SF Rush had more control and less randomness, then you'll love this. Hot Wheels does a little of everything pretty well, but doesn't execute everything well enough to remain a standout game for more than a month."
