= Jimmy Preston =

American musician and minister

James Alfred Smith Preston (August 18, 1913 – December 17, 1984) was an American R&B bandleader, alto saxophonist, drummer and singer who made an important contribution to early rock and roll.

== Career ==
Preston was born in Chester, Pennsylvania, and formed his own group in 1945. His first R&B top ten hit was with "Hucklebuck Daddy" in 1949, recorded for Philadelphia's Gotham Records. His main claim to fame was to record, as Jimmy Preston and His Prestonians, the original version of "Rock the Joint" for Gotham in 1949. The sax breaks on "Rock the Joint" were the work of tenor player Danny Turner (1920–1995). "Rock the Joint" was re-recorded by Jimmy Cavallo in 1951, and Bill Haley and the Saddlemen in 1952.

In 1950, tenor saxophone player Benny Golson and pianist Billy Gaines were added to his new line-up and recorded songs like "Hay Ride" and "Early Morning Blues". Preston moved to Derby Records and had a final R&B hit with a cover of Louis Prima’s "Oh Babe".

Preston gave up playing music in 1952, but as Reverend Dr. James S. Preston, he founded the Victory Baptist Church in 1962. He died in Philadelphia in 1984, aged 71.

== Discography ==
Jimmy Preston & His Prestonians on Gotham Records...

- 166 Let Me Call You Sweetheart // Messin' With Preston (11/1948)
- 170 Numbers Blues // Chop Suey, Louie (1/1949)
- 175 Hucklebuck Daddy // Sugar Baby (3/1949)
- 180 Hold Me, Baby // Home Cookin' (5/1949)
- 188 Rock The Joint // Drinking Woman (8/1949)
- 204 The Bells of St. Mary's // Foolish Me (11/1949)
- 206 Going Away // Credit Blues (12/1949)
- 216 They Call Me The Champ // Swingin' In The Groove (1950)
- 228 Hay Ride // Early Morning Blues (1950)
- 240 Estellina Bim Bam // Do The Bump (1950)
- 246 Let's Hang Out Tonight // Potato Salad (1950)

Jimmy Preston With The Jimmy Preston Orchestra on Derby Records...

- 748 Oh Babe! // Stop That Baby (10/1950) both sides with Burnetta Evans-vocal
- 751 Rock With It Baby // My Baby Done Left Me (1950)
- 755 Roll, Roll, Roll // Front Door Blues (1951)
