= The Full-Custom Gospel Sounds of the Reverend Horton Heat =

Studio album by The Reverend Horton Heat
- Released: April 20, 1993
- Studio: Ardent Studios, Memphis, Tennessee
- Genre: Psychobilly
- Length: 39:49
- Label: Sub Pop
- Producer: Gibby Haynes

The Reverend Horton Heat chronology
| Smoke 'Em If You Got 'Em (1990) | The Full-Custom Gospel Sounds of the Reverend Horton Heat (1993) | Liquor in the Front (1994) |

Back cover

Professional ratings
Review scores
| Source | Rating |
|---|---|
| AllMusic | 4/5 stars |
| CMJ | (favorable) |

The Full-Custom Gospel Sounds of the Reverend Horton Heat is the second album by The Reverend Horton Heat. It was released in April 1993 on Sub Pop.

The video for "Wiggle Stick" was featured on an episode of Beavis and Butt-head.

"Nurture My Pig" and "Wiggle Stick" were included in the Redneck Rampage video game soundtrack. Some bars in the game also have a loop of "Beer:30" playing in the background.

The song "Loaded Gun" was performed by the group in a strip club scene in the film Love and a .45 but was not included on the film's soundtrack.

"Nurture My Pig" was covered live by X-Cops, a Gwar side-project.

== Track listing ==
All songs by Jim Heath, except "Nurture My Pig" by Loco Gringos.

1. "Wiggle Stick" – 3:00
2. "400 Bucks" – 3:09
3. "The Devil's Chasing Me" – 5:21
4. "Livin' on the Edge (Of Houston)" – 2:52
5. "You Can't Get Away from Me" – 2:26
6. "Beer:30" – 3:00
7. "Big Little Baby" – 2:31
8. "Lonesome Train Whistle" – 3:22
9. "Bales of Cocaine" – 2:11
10. "Loaded Gun" – 4:18
11. "Nurture My Pig" – 4:00
12. "Gin and Tonic Blues" – 3:39

== Personnel ==
- Jim "Reverend Horton" Heath - vocals, guitar
- Jimbo Wallace - upright bass
- Taz Bentley - drums
- Gibby Haynes - producer
- Erik Flettrich - engineer
- Art Chantry - design
- James Bland - photos
