= Smoke 'Em If You Got 'Em (The Reverend Horton Heat album) =

Studio album by the Reverend Horton Heat
- Released: 1990
- Genre: Psychobilly
- Length: 39:55
- Label: Sub Pop

The Reverend Horton Heat chronology
Smoke 'Em If You Got 'Em (1990)	The Full-Custom Gospel Sounds of the Reverend Horton Heat (1993)

Smoke 'Em If You Got 'Em is the first album by the American band the Reverend Horton Heat. It was released in 1990 on the label Sub Pop.

== Critical reception ==
Professional ratings
Review scores
Source	Rating
AllMusic	4/5 stars
The Encyclopedia of Popular Music	3/5 stars
MusicHound Rock: The Essential Album Guide	3/5 stars
(The New) Rolling Stone Album Guide	2.5/5 stars

Trouser Press called the album "fresh but mild," writing that the band "never really cut loose." MusicHound Rock: The Essential Album Guide wrote that the album "shows RHH before it grew out of its kitchy [sic] phase." (The New) Rolling Stone Album Guide called it "entirely derivative ... but it's also got plenty of verve and a touch of wit."

== Track listing ==
All songs by Jim Heath, except as indicated.

1. "Bullet" – 3:06
2. "I'm Mad" – 3:16
3. "Bad Reputation" (Heath/Bentley) – 2:25
4. "It's a Dark Day" – 5:04
5. "Big Dwarf Rodeo" – 3:02
6. "Psychobilly Freakout" – 2:39
7. "Put It to Me Straight" – 2:34
8. "Marijuana" (Heath/Wallace) – 4:49
9. "Baby, You Know Who" – 2:39
10. "Eat Steak" – 2:33
11. "'D' for Dangerous" – 4:05
12. "Love Whip" – 3:43

== Personnel ==
- Jim "Reverend Horton" Heath – vocals, guitar
- Jimbo Wallace – upright bass
- Patrick "Taz" Bentley – drums
- Tim Alexander (of Asleep at the Wheel) – piano (on "Love Whip")
- Hook Herrerra (Hook and the Hitch-Hikers) – harmonica (on "Love Whip")
- The Psychic Plowboy Horn Section (a.k.a., The Hooterville Horns) – horns (on "Love Whip")
