= Rockabilly =

Early style of rock and roll music

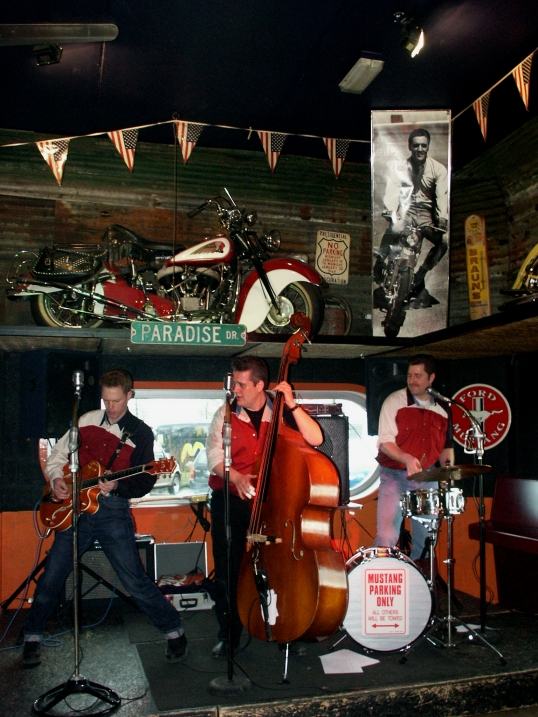
- Classic instruments associated with rockabilly are a hollow-body electric guitar, an upright bass, and a pared-down drum kit.
- Stylistic origins: Country; bluegrass; western swing; rhythm and blues
- Cultural origins: Early to mid-1950s, Southern United States
- Derivative forms: Garage rock

Fusion genres
- Psychobilly; gothabilly

Other topics
- Country rock

Rockabilly is one of the earliest styles of rock and roll music. It dates back to the early 1950s in the United States, especially the South. As a genre, it blends the sound of Western musical styles such as country with that of rhythm and blues, leading to what is considered "classic" rock and roll. Some have also described it as a blend of bluegrass with rock and roll. The term "rockabilly" itself is a portmanteau of "rock" (from "rock 'n' roll") and "hillbilly", the latter a reference to the country music (often called "hillbilly music" in the 1940s and 1950s) that contributed strongly to the style. Other important influences on rockabilly include Western swing, boogie-woogie, jump blues, and electric blues.

Defining features of the rockabilly sound included strong rhythms, boogie woogie piano riffs, vocal twangs, doo-wop a capella singing, and common use of the tape echo; and eventually came to incorporate different instruments and vocal harmonies. Initially popularized by artists such as Carl Perkins, Elvis Presley, Johnny Burnette, Jerry Lee Lewis and others, the rockabilly style waned in the late 1950s; nonetheless, during the late 1970s and early 1980s, rockabilly enjoyed a revival. An interest in the genre endures even in the 21st century, often within musical subcultures. Rockabilly has spawned a variety of sub-styles and has influenced the development of other genres such as punk rock.

== History ==
There was a close relationship between blues and country music from the very earliest country recordings in the 1920s. The first nationwide country hit was "Wreck of the Old 97", backed with "The Prisoner's Song", which also became quite popular. Jimmie Rodgers, the "first true country star", was known as the "Blue Yodeler", and most of his songs used blues-based chord progressions, although with very different instrumentation and sound from the recordings of his black contemporaries like Blind Lemon Jefferson and Bessie Smith.

During the 1930s and 1940s, two new sounds emerged. Bob Wills and his Texas Playboys were the leading proponents of Western Swing, which combined country singing and steel guitar with big band jazz influences and horn sections; Wills's music found massive popularity. Recordings of Wills's from the mid 1940s to the early 1950s include "two beat jazz" rhythms, "jazz choruses", and guitar work that preceded early rockabilly recordings. Wills is quoted as saying "Rock and Roll? Why, man, that's the same kind of music we've been playin' since 1928!... But it's just basic rhythm and has gone by a lot of different names in my time. It's the same, whether you just follow a drum beat like in Africa or surround it with a lot of instruments. The rhythm's what's important."

After blues artists like Albert Ammons, Meade Lux Lewis and Pete Johnson launched a nationwide boogie craze starting in 1938, country artists like Moon Mullican, the Delmore Brothers, Tennessee Ernie Ford, Speedy West, Jimmy Bryant, and the Maddox Brothers and Rose began recording what was then known as "hillbilly boogie", which consisted of "hillbilly" vocals and instrumentation with a boogie bass line.

After World War II, The Maddox Brothers and Rose were at "the leading edge of rockabilly with the slapped bass that Fred Maddox had developed". They had shifted into higher gear leaning toward a whimsical honky-tonk feel, with a heavy, manic bottom end and high volume. The Maddoxes were known for their lively, antic-filled shows, which were an influential novelty for white listeners and musicians alike.

Along with country, swing and boogie influences, jump blues artists such as Wynonie Harris and Roy Brown, and electric blues acts such as Howlin' Wolf, Junior Parker, and Arthur Crudup, influenced the development of rockabilly. The Memphis blues musician Junior Parker and his electric blues band, Little Junior's Blue Flames, featuring Pat Hare on the guitar, were a major influence on the rockabilly style, particularly with their songs "Love My Baby" and "Mystery Train" in 1953.

Zeb Turner's February 1953 recording of "Jersey Rock" with its mix of musical styles, lyrics about music and dancing, and guitar solo, is another example of the mixing of musical genres in the first half of the 1950s.

Bill Monroe is known as the Father of Bluegrass, a specific style of country music. Many of his songs were in blues form, while others took the form of folk ballads, parlor songs, or waltzes. Bluegrass was a staple of country music in the early 1950s and is often mentioned as an influence in the development of rockabilly, in part owing to its favoring of fast tempos.

The Honky Tonk sound, which "tended to focus on working-class life, with frequently tragic themes of lost love, adultery, loneliness, alcoholism, and self-pity", also included songs of energetic, uptempo hillbilly boogie. Some of the better known musicians who recorded and performed these songs are: the Delmore Brothers, the Maddox Brothers and Rose, Merle Travis, Hank Williams, Hank Snow, and Tennessee Ernie Ford.

=== Tennessee ===
White sharecroppers' sons Carl Perkins and his brothers Jay and Clayton, along with drummer W. S. Holland, had established themselves as one of the hottest bands on the honky-tonk circuit around Jackson, Tennessee. Most of the songs they played were country standards with a faster rhythm. It was here that Carl started composing his first songs. While playing, he would watch the dance floor to see what the audience preferred and adjust his compositions to suit, writing them down only when he was sure they were finished. Carl sent numerous demos to New York record companies with no success; the producers believed the Perkins' style of rhythmically-driven country was not commercially viable. That would change in 1955 after recording the song "Blue Suede Shoes" (recorded December 19, 1955) on Sam Phillips' Memphis-based Sun Records. Later made more famous by Elvis Presley, Perkins' original version was an early rock 'n' roll standard.

In the early 1950s, there was heavy competition among Memphis area bands playing an audience-savvy mix of covers, original songs, and hillbilly flavored blues. One source mentions both local disc jockey Dewey Phillips and producer Sam Phillips as being influential. An early radio show on KWEM in West Memphis, Arkansas quickly became a mix of blues, country and early rockabilly. The Saturday Night Jamboree was a Memphis stage show held every Saturday night at the Goodwyn Institute Auditorium in downtown Memphis, Tennessee from 1953–1954. The Jamboree shows were sometimes broadcast live on KWEM. A number of future notables performed there, including Elvis Presley. The performers often experimented with new sounds in their dressing rooms, incorporating the best ones into their shows.

In 1951 and 1952, brothers Johnny and Dorsey Burnette, as well as Paul Burlison, played a blend of blues, country, and rockabilly at live shows in and around the Memphis area. in 1953, they played with Doc McQueen's swing band at the Hideaway Club for a time. While there, they wrote a song called "Rock Billy Boogie", named after the Burnette brothers' sons Rocky and Billy (Rocky Burnette later became a rock and roll star in his own right; Billy Burnette also had a music career and was in Fleetwood Mac in the late 80s to mid 90s), although they did not record the song until 1957. The Burnettes disliked the popular music McQueen played, so they began playing smaller shows on their own, focusing on their budding rockabilly sound. The trio released "Train Kept A-Rollin'" in 1956, listed by Rolling Stone magazine as one of the top 500 rock songs of all time. Many consider this 1956 recording to be the first intentional use of a distortion effect on a rock song, which was played by lead guitarist Paul Burlison.

=== Elvis Presley ===
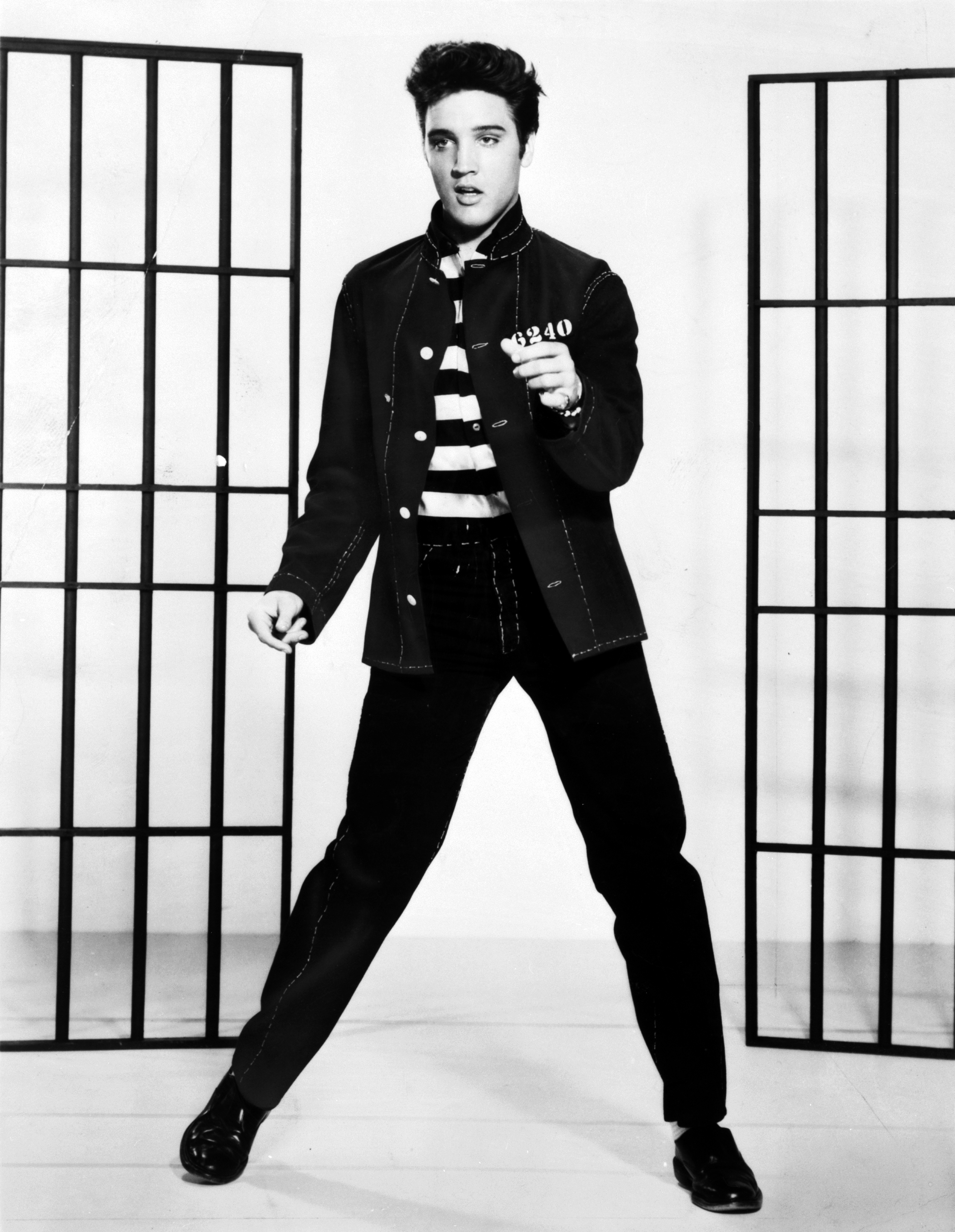
Elvis Presley in a promotional shot for Jailhouse Rock in 1957

Elvis Presley - "That's All Right" (1954)
Elvis Presley's "That's All Right" (1954), an early rockabilly song. It was a cover of Arthur Crudup's 1946 blues song of the same name.

Elvis Presley's first recordings took place at Sun Records, a small independent label run by record producer Sam Phillips in Memphis, Tennessee. For several years, Phillips had been recording and releasing performances by blues and country musicians in the area. He also ran a service allowing anyone to come in off the street and for a modest fee, record themselves on a two-song vanity record. One young man who came to record himself as a surprise for his mother, he claimed, was Elvis Presley.

Presley made enough of an impression that Phillips deputized guitarist Scotty Moore, who then enlisted bassist Bill Black, both from the Starlight Wranglers, a local Western swing band, to work with the young man. The trio rehearsed dozens of songs, from traditional country to gospel. During a break on July 5, 1954, Elvis started playing "That's All Right Mama", a 1946 blues song by Arthur Crudup, and Moore and Black joined in. After several takes, Phillips had a satisfactory recording. "That's All Right" was released on July 19, 1954.

Presley's version of "That's All Right Mama" melded country, a genre associated with European-American culture, and rhythm & blues, a genre associated with African-American culture. The resulting track was denied airplay on both country radio stations and R&B stations for being "too black" and "too white", respectively. Country deejays told Phillips they would be "run out of town" for playing it. When the song was finally played by one rogue deejay, Dewey Phillips, Presley's recording created so much excitement it was described as having waged war on segregated radio stations.

All of Presley's early singles featured a blues song on one side and a country song on the other, both sung in the same genre-blending style. Presley's Sun recordings feature his vocals and rhythm guitar, Bill Black's percussive slapped bass, and Scotty Moore on an amplified guitar. Slap bass had been a staple of both Western swing and hillbilly boogie since the 1940s. Scotty Moore described his playing style as an amalgamation of techniques he had picked up from other guitarists over the years. Presley's unique musical style rocketed him into the spotlight, and drew masses of followers.

Nobody was sure what to call Presley's music, so Elvis was described as "The Hillbilly Cat" and "King of Western Bop". Over the next year, Elvis would record four more singles for Sun. Rockabilly recorded by artists prior to Presley can be described as being in the long-standing country style of Rockabilly. Presley's recordings are described by some as quintessential rockabilly for their true union of country and R&B, which can be described as the true realization of the Rockabilly genre. In addition to the fusion of distinct genres, Presley's recordings contain some traditional as well as new traits: "nervously up tempo" (as Peter Guralnick describes it), with slap bass, fancy guitar picking, much echo, shouts of encouragement, and vocals full of histrionics such as hiccups, stutters, and swoops from falsetto to bass and back again.

In 1955, Elvis asked D.J. Fontana, the drummer for the Louisiana Hayride, to join him for future dates. By that time, many rockabilly bands were incorporating drums, which distinguished the sound from country music, where they were then uncommon. In the 1956 sessions shortly after Presley's move from Sun Records to RCA Victor, Presley was backed by a band that included Moore, Black, Fontana, and pianist Floyd Cramer. In 1956, Elvis also acquired vocal backup via the Jordanaires.

=== North of the Mason-Dixon Line ===
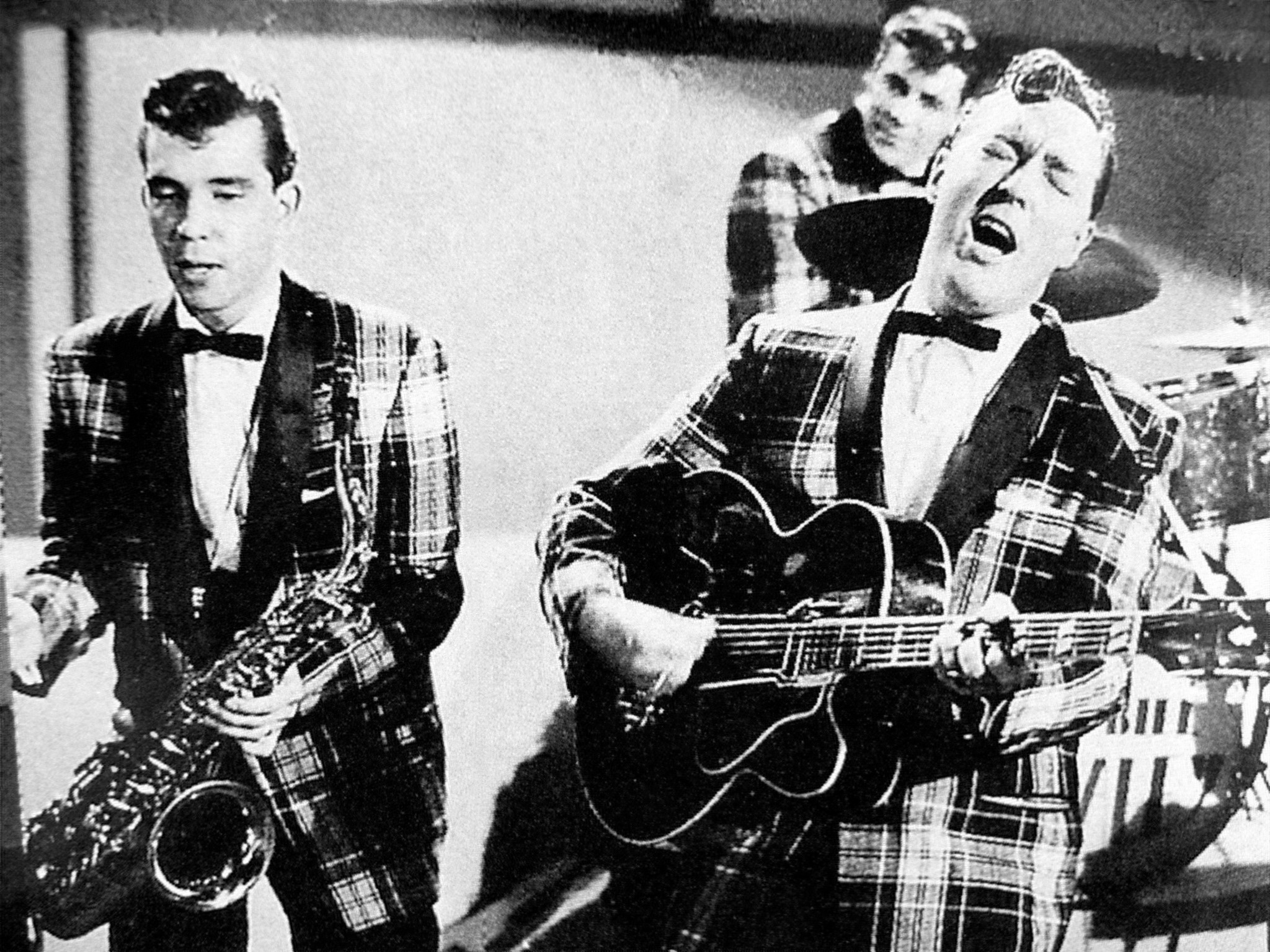
Bill Haley and His Comets during a TV appearance

Bill Haley and His Comets - "Rock Around the Clock" (1954)
Bill Haley and His Comets' "Rock Around the Clock" (1954) is credited with popularizing rockabilly music.

In 1951 a Western swing bandleader named Bill Haley recorded a version of "Rocket 88" with his group, the Saddlemen. It is considered one of the earliest recognized rockabilly recordings. It was followed by versions of "Rock the Joint" in 1952, and original works such as "Real Rock Drive" and "Crazy Man, Crazy", the latter of which reached number 12 on the American Billboard chart in 1953. On April 12, 1954, Haley, performing with his band as Bill Haley and His Comets, recorded "Rock Around the Clock" for Decca Records of New York City. When first released in May 1954, "Rock Around the Clock" made the charts for one week at number 23, and sold 75,000 copies. In 1955, it was featured in the film Blackboard Jungle, resulting in a resurgence of sales. The song hit No. 1, held that position for eight weeks, and was the number two song on the Billboard Hot 100 chart for 1955. The recording was, until the late 1990s, recognized by Guinness World Records as having the highest sales claim for a pop vinyl recording, with an "unaudited" claim of 25 million copies sold.

Maine native and Connecticut resident Bill Flagg began using the term rockabilly for his combination of rock 'n' roll and hillbilly music as early as 1953. He cut several songs for Tetra Records in 1956 and 1957. "Go Cat Go" went into the National Billboard charts in 1956, and his "Guitar Rock" is cited as classic rockabilly.

In 1953, 13-year-old Janis Martin was performing at the Old Dominion Barn Dance on WRVA out of Richmond, Virginia. Martin performed a mix of country songs for the show peppered with rhythm and blues hits in a style that has been described as "proto-rockabilly". She later stated, "the audience didn't know what to make of it. They didn't hardly allow electric instruments, and I was doing some songs by black artists."

=== Cash, Perkins and Presley ===
In 1954, both Johnny Cash and Carl Perkins auditioned for Sam Phillips. Cash hoped to record gospel music, but Phillips was not interested. In October 1954, Carl Perkins recorded his original song "Movie Magg", which was released in March 1955 on Phillips's all-country label Flip. Cash returned to Sun in 1955 with his song "Hey, Porter", and his group the Tennessee Two, consisting of Marshall Grant on bass, and Luther Perkins (no relation to Carl Perkins) on lead guitar. This song and another Cash original, "Cry! Cry! Cry!" were released in July. "Cry! Cry! Cry!" managed to crack Billboard's Top 20, peaking at No. 14.

Presley's second and third singles were not as successful as his first. His fourth release, "Baby, Let's Play House", was released in May 1955, and peaked at number five on the national Billboard Country Chart. In August, Sun released Elvis's versions of "I Forgot to Remember to Forget" and "Mystery Train". "Remember to Forget" spent a total of 39 weeks on the Billboard Country Chart, five at the number one spot. "Mystery Train", peaked at number 11.

Through most of 1955, Cash, Perkins, Presley, and other Louisiana Hayride performers toured through Texas, Arkansas, Oklahoma, Louisiana and Mississippi. Sun released two more Perkins songs in October: "Gone, Gone, Gone" and "Let the Jukebox Keep on Playing". Perkins and Presley in particular competed as the premier rockabilly artists.

=== Rockabilly goes national: 1956 ===
In March 1956, Columbia released "Honky Tonk Man" by Johnny Horton, King put out "Seven Nights to Rock" by Moon Mullican, Mercury issued "Rockin' Daddy" by Eddie Bond, and Starday released Bill Mack's "Fat Woman". Two young men from Texas made their record debuts in April 1956: Buddy Holly on the Decca label, and, as a member of the Teen Kings, Roy Orbison with "Ooby Dooby" on the New Mexico/Texas based Je-wel label. Holly's big hits would not be released until 1957. Janis Martin was only fifteen years old when RCA issued a record with "Will You, Willyum" and the Martin-composed "Drugstore Rock 'n' Roll", which sold over 750,000 copies. King records issued a new disk by forty-seven-year-old Moon Mullican: "Seven Nights to Rock" and "Rock 'N' Roll Mr. Bullfrog". Twenty more sides were issued by various labels including 4 Star, Blue Hen, Dot, Cold Bond, Mercury, Reject, Republic, Rodeo, and Starday.

In April and May 1956, the Rock and Roll Trio played on Ted Mack's TV talent show in New York City. They won all three times and guaranteed them a finalist position in the September supershow. Gene Vincent and His Blue Caps' recording of "Be-Bop-A-Lula" was released on June 2, 1956, backed by "Woman Love". Within twenty-one days it sold over two hundred thousand records, stayed at the top of national pop and country charts for twenty weeks, and sold more than a million copies. These same musicians would have two more releases in 1956, followed by another in January 1957. "Queen of Rockabilly" Wanda Jackson's first record came out in July, "I Gotta Know" on the Capitol label; followed by "Hot Dog That Made Him Mad" in November. Capitol would release nine more records by Jackson, some with songs she had written herself, before the 1950s were over. The first record by Jerry Lee Lewis, who would later be known as a pioneer of rockabilly and rock and roll, came out on December 22, 1956, and featured his version of "Crazy Arms" and "End of the Road". Lewis would have big hits in 1957 with his version of "Whole Lotta Shakin' Goin' On", issued in May, and "Great Balls Of Fire" on Sun.

=== Late 1950s and decline ===
There were thousands of musicians who recorded songs in the rockabilly style, and many record companies released rockabilly records. Some enjoyed major chart success and were important influences on future rock musicians.

Sun also hosted performers, such as Billy Lee Riley, Sonny Burgess, Charlie Feathers, and Warren Smith. There were also several female performers like Wanda Jackson who recorded rockabilly music long after the other ladies, Janis Martin, the female Elvis Jo Ann Campbell, and Alis Lesley, who also sang in the rockabilly style. Mel "Slim" Kimbrough, recorded "I Get Lonesome Too" and "Ha, Ha, Hey, Hey" for Glenn Records along with "Love in West Virginia" and "Country Rock Sound" for Checkmate, a division of Caprice Records.

Gene Summers, a Dallas native and Rockabilly Hall of Fame inductee, released his classic Jan/Jane 45s in 1958–59. He continued to record rockabilly music well into 1964 with the release of "Alabama Shake". In 2005, Summers's most popular recording, School of Rock 'n Roll, was selected by Bob Solly and Record Collector Magazine as one of the "100 Greatest Rock 'n' Roll Records".

Tommy "Sleepy LaBeef" LaBeff recorded rockabilly tunes on a number of labels from 1957 through 1963. Rockabilly pioneers the Maddox Brothers and Rose continued to record for decades. However, none of these artists had any major hits and their influence would not be felt until decades later.

In the summer of 1958 Eddie Cochran had a chart-topping hit with "Summertime Blues". Cochran's brief career included only a few more hits, such as "Sitting in the Balcony" released in early 1957, "C'mon Everybody" released in October 1958, and "Somethin' Else" released in July 1959. Then in April 1960, while touring with Gene Vincent in the UK, their taxi crashed into a concrete lamp post, killing Eddie at the young age of 21. The grim coincidence in this all was that his posthumous UK number-one hit was called "Three Steps to Heaven".

Rockabilly music enjoyed great popularity in the United States during 1956 and 1957, but radio play declined after 1960. Factors contributing to this decline are usually cited as the 1959 death of Buddy Holly in an airplane crash (along with Ritchie Valens and the Big Bopper), the induction of Elvis Presley into the army in 1958, and a general change in American musical tastes. The style remained popular longer in England, where it attracted a fanatical following right up through the mid-1960s.

Rockabilly music cultivated an attitude that assured its enduring appeal to teenagers. This was a combination of rebellion, sexuality, and freedom—a sneering expression of disdain for the workaday world of parents and authority figures. It was the first rock 'n' roll style to be performed primarily by white musicians, thus setting off a cultural revolution that is still reverberating today. "Rockabilly" deviance from social norms, however, was more symbolic than real; and eventual public professions of faith by aging rockabillies were not uncommon.

=== Influence on the Beatles and the British Invasion ===
The first wave of rockabilly fans in the United Kingdom were called Teddy Boys because they wore long, Edwardian-style frock coats, along with tight black drainpipe trousers and brothel creeper shoes. Another group in the 1950s that were followers of rockabilly were the Ton-Up boys, who rode British motorcycles and would later be known as rockers in the early 1960s. The rockers had adopted the classic greaser look of T-shirts, jeans, and leather jackets to go with their heavily slicked pompadour haircuts. The rockers loved 1950s rock and roll artists such as Gene Vincent, and some British rockabilly fans formed bands and played their own version of the music.

The most notable of these bands was The Beatles. When John Lennon first met Paul McCartney, he was impressed that McCartney knew all the chords and the words to Eddie Cochran's "Twenty Flight Rock". As the band became more professional and began playing in Hamburg, they took on the "Beatle" name (inspired by Buddy Holly's band The Crickets) and they adopted the black leather look of Gene Vincent. Musically, they combined Holly's melodic songwriting sensibility with the rough rock and roll sound of Vincent and Carl Perkins. When The Beatles became worldwide stars, they released versions of three different Carl Perkins songs, more than any other songwriter outside the band, except Larry Williams, who also added three songs to their discography. (Curiously, none of these three were sung by the Beatles' regular lead vocalists—"Honey Don't" (sung by Ringo) and "Everybody's Trying to be my Baby" (sung by George) from Beatles for Sale (1964) and "Matchbox" (sung by Ringo) on the Long Tall Sally EP (1964)).

Long after the band broke up, the members continued to show their interest in rockabilly. In 1975, Lennon recorded an album called Rock 'n' Roll, featuring versions of rockabilly hits and a cover photo showing him in full Gene Vincent leather. About the same time, Ringo Starr had a hit with a version of Johnny Burnette's "You're Sixteen". In the 1980s, McCartney recorded a duet with Carl Perkins, and George Harrison collaborated with Roy Orbison in the Traveling Wilburys. In 1999, McCartney released Run Devil Run, his own record of rockabilly covers.

The Beatles were not the only British Invasion artists influenced by rockabilly. The Rolling Stones recorded Buddy Holly's "Not Fade Away" on an early single and later a rockabilly-style song, "Rip This Joint", on Exile on Main St. The Who, despite being mod favorites, covered Eddie Cochran's "Summertime Blues" and Johnny Kidd and The Pirates' Shakin' All Over on their Live at Leeds album. Even heavy guitar heroes such as Jeff Beck and Jimmy Page were influenced by rockabilly musicians. Beck recorded his own tribute album to Gene Vincent's guitarist Cliff Gallup—Crazy Legs—and Page's band, Led Zeppelin, offered to work as Elvis Presley's backing band in the 1970s. However, Presley never took them up on that offer. Years later, Led Zeppelin's Page and Robert Plant recorded a tribute to the music of the 1950s called The Honeydrippers: Volume One.

=== Rockabilly revival: 1970–1990 ===
The 1968 Elvis "comeback" and acts such as Sha Na Na, Creedence Clearwater Revival, Don McLean, Linda Ronstadt and the Everly Brothers, the film American Graffiti, the television show Happy Days and the Teddy Boy revival created curiosity about the real music of the 1950s, particularly in England, where a rockabilly revival scene began to develop from the 1970s in record collecting and clubs. The most successful early product of the scene was Dave Edmunds, who joined up with songwriter Nick Lowe to form a band called Rockpile in 1975. They had a string of minor rockabilly-style hits like "I Knew the Bride (When She Used to Rock 'n' Roll)". The group became a popular touring act in the UK and the US, leading to respectable album sales. Edmunds also nurtured and produced many younger artists who shared his love of rockabilly, most notably the Stray Cats. Rip Carson, a member of the band, mentioned his distaste for the tendency to blindly classify any modern rock band using a double bass as "rockabilly," which is evident when "listening to Gene Maltais's New England accent or Freddy Cannon's Boston accent, suggesting a lack of hillbilly influence and the need for a new term like "hardcore rock and roll or "frantic, primitive, raw, wild" rock and roll.

Robert Gordon emerged from late 1970s CBGB punk act Tuff Darts to reinvent himself as a rockabilly revival solo artist. He recorded first with 1950s guitar legend Link Wray and later with UK studio guitar veteran Chris Spedding and found borderline mainstream success. Also festering at CBGB's punk environs were The Cramps, who combined primitive and wild rockabilly sounds with lyrics inspired by old drive-in horror movies in songs like "Human Fly" and "I Was a Teenage Werewolf". Lead singer Lux Interior's energetic and unpredictable live shows attracted a fervent cult audience. Their "psychobilly" music influenced The Meteors and Reverend Horton Heat. In the early '80s, the Latin genre was born in Colombia by Marco T (Marco Tulio Sanchez), with The Gatos Montañeros. The Polecats, from North London, were originally called The Cult Heroes; they could not get any gigs at rockabilly clubs with a name that sounded "punk", so the original drummer Chris Hawkes came up with the name "Polecats". Tim Polecat and Boz Boorer started playing together in 1976, then hooked up with Phil Bloomberg and Chris Hawkes at the end of 1977. The Polecats played rockabilly with a punk sense of anarchy and helped revive the genre for a new generation in the early 1980s.

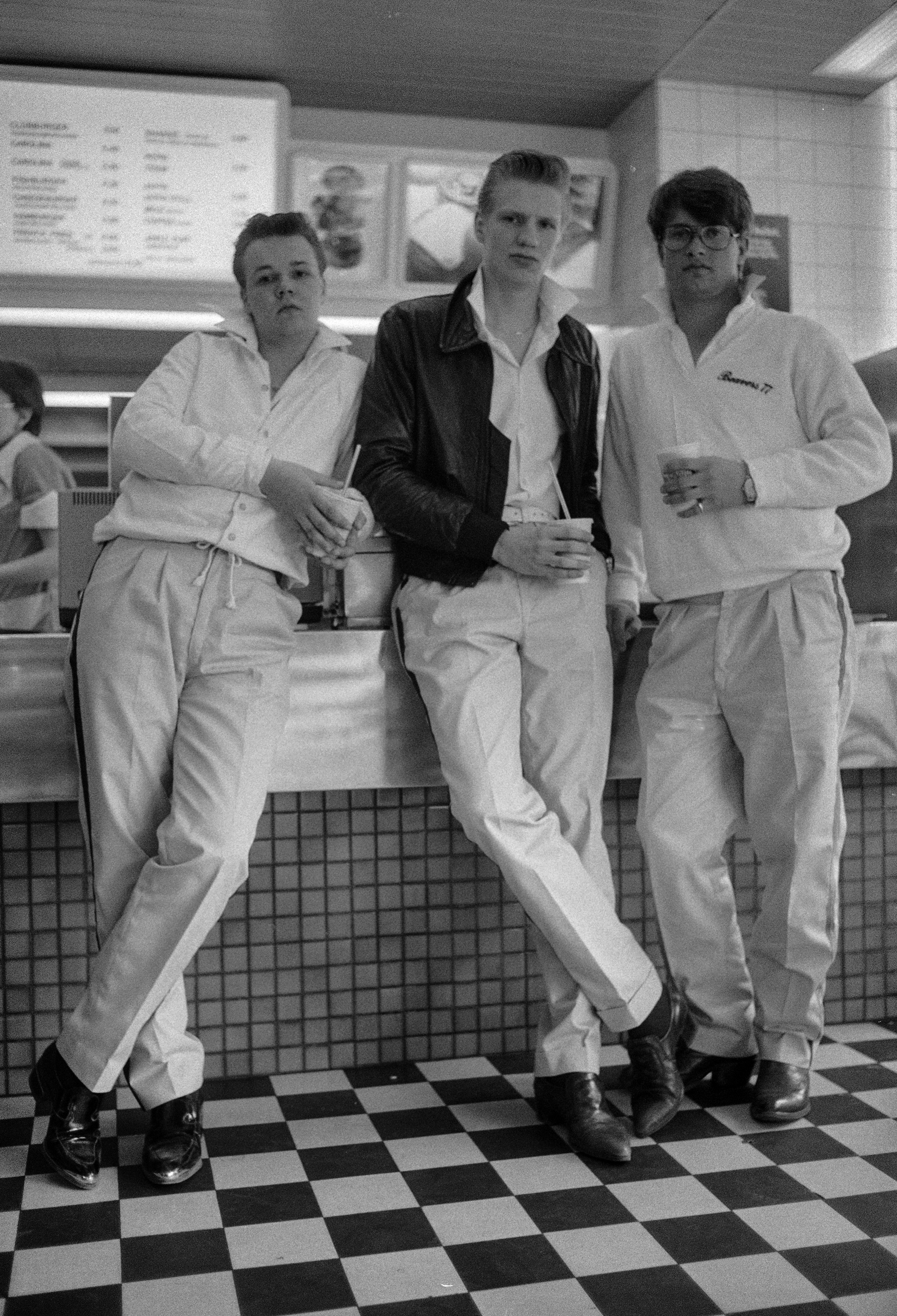
Teddy & The Tigers, a Finnish rockabilly band from Kerava, pictured in Helsinki, 1978

The Blasters, who emerged from the Los Angeles punk scene, included rockabilly among their roots rock influences. The song "Marie Marie", first appearing on their 1980 debut album American Music, would later become a breakthrough hit for Shakin' Stevens.

Also in 1980, Queen scored a number-one hit on the Billboard Hot 100 with the rockabilly-inspired single "Crazy Little Thing Called Love".

The Stray Cats were the most commercially successful of the new rockabilly artists. The band formed on Long Island in 1979 when Brian Setzer teamed up with two school chums calling themselves Lee Rocker and Slim Jim Phantom. Attracting little attention in New York, they flew to London in 1980, where they had heard that there was an active rockabilly scene. Early shows were attended by the Rolling Stones and Dave Edmunds, who quickly ushered the boys into a recording studio. The Stray Cats had three UK Top Ten singles to their credit and two bestselling albums. They returned to the US, performing on the TV show Fridays with a message flashing across the screen that they had no record deal in the States.

Soon EMI picked them up, their first videos appeared on MTV, and they stormed up the charts stateside. Their third LP, Rant 'N' Rave with the Stray Cats, topped charts across the US and Europe as they sold-out shows everywhere during 1983. However, personal conflicts led the band to break up at the height of their popularity. Brian Setzer went on to solo success working in both rockabilly and swing styles, while Rocker and Phantom continued to record in bands both together and singly. The group has reconvened several times to make new records or tours and continue to attract large audiences live, although record sales have never again approached their early '80s success.

The Jime entered the rockabilly scene in 1983, when Vince Gordon formed his band. The Jime was a Danish band. The Jime was the band of Vince Gordon, rockabilly guitarist. Not only was he the nerve of the band, Vince Gordon was the band. He composed nearly all its songs and hits. Vince Gordon also left his mark on the rockabilly scene in many ways. Expert Fred Sokolow talks about the Vince Gordon style in Rockabilly due to his composing. Vince Gordon had many different musicians in his band. The lifetime of the Jime ended with the death of Vince Gordon in 2016.

Shakin' Stevens was a Welsh singer who gained fame in the UK portraying Elvis in a stage play. In 1980, he took a cover of The Blasters' "Marie Marie" into the UK Top 20. His hopped-up versions of songs like "This Ole House" and "Green Door" were giant sellers across Europe. Shakin' Stevens was the biggest selling singles artist of the 1980s in the UK (with four number ones in the singles chart) and number two across Europe, outstripping Michael Jackson, Prince, and Bruce Springsteen. Unlike The Stray Cats, who became successful due in part to MTV, Shakin' Stevens' success was initially due to him appearing on various children's television shows in Britain. Despite his popularity in Europe, he never became a big success in the US. In 2005, his greatest hits album The Collection reached number four in the British albums chart, and was released as a tie-in to his appearance on ITV entertainment show Hit Me, Baby, One More Time, going on to become the winner of the series. Other notable British rockabilly bands of the 1980s included The Jets, Crazy Cavan, Matchbox, and the Rockats.

Jason & the Scorchers combined heavy metal, Chuck Berry and Hank Williams to create a punk-influenced style of rockabilly, often labeled as alt-country or cowpunk. They achieved critical acclaim and a following in America but never managed a major hit.

The revival was related to the "roots rock" movement, which continued through the 1980s, led by artists like James Intveld, who later toured as lead guitar for The Blasters, High Noon, the Beat Farmers, The Paladins, Forbidden Pigs, Del-Lords, Long Ryders, The Last Wild Sons, The Fabulous Thunderbirds, Los Lobos, The Fleshtones, Del Fuegos, Reverend Horton Heat and Barrence Whitfield and the Savages. These bands, like the Blasters, were inspired by a full range of historic American styles: blues, country, rockabilly, R&B and New Orleans jazz. They held a strong appeal for listeners who were tired of the commercially oriented MTV-style synthpop and glam metal bands that dominated radio play during this time period, but none of these musicians became major stars.

In 1983, Neil Young recorded a rockabilly album titled Everybody's Rockin'. The album was not a commercial success and Young was involved in a widely publicized legal fight with Geffen Records who sued him for making a record that did not sound "like a Neil Young record". Young made no further albums in the rockabilly style. During the 1980s, a number of country music stars scored hits recording in a rockabilly style. Marty Stuart's "Hillbilly Rock" and Hank Williams, Jr.'s "All My Rowdy Friends Are Coming Over Tonight" were the most noteworthy examples of this trend, but they and other artists like Steve Earle and the Kentucky Headhunters charted many records with this approach.

The rockabilly revival of 1970 to 1990 also saw the genre intersect with outsider music, from artists such as Hasil Adkins, The Legendary Stardust Cowboy, and Ralph Gean.

=== Neo-rockabilly (1990–present) ===
Rockabilly dancers in Japan, 2016

While not true rockabilly, many contemporary indie pop, blues rock, and country rock groups from the US, like Kings of Leon, The Black Keys, Blackfoot, and the White Stripes, were heavily influenced by rockabilly.

The Smiths incorporated rockabilly influences in songs such as "Nowhere Fast", "Shakespeare's Sister" and "Vicar in a Tutu". The style also influenced their look towards the end of their five-year existence in the 1980s. Morrissey also adopted a rockabilly style during the early 1990s, being largely influenced by his guitarists Boz Boorer and Alain Whyte and working with former Fairground Attraction bass-guitarist and songwriter Mark E. Nevin. His rockabilly style was emphasised in the singles "Pregnant for the Last Time" and "Sing Your Life", as well as his second solo album and tour Kill Uncle.

The aforementioned Reverend Horton Heat have been stalwarts of the neo-rockabilly scene since their formation in Dallas, Texas in 1985. Early releases such as Smoke 'Em If You Got 'Em (1990) and Full-Custom Gospel Sounds (1993) were a more accessible take on psychobilly, while It's Martini Time (1996) incorporated notable influences from the incipient retro swing revival. More recently, beginning with Spend a Night in the Box (2000), they have settled into a groove of more-or-less straight-ahead rockabilly.

Irish rockabilly artist Imelda May has been partly responsible for a resurgence of European interest in the genre, scoring three successive number one albums in Ireland, with two of those also reaching the top ten in the UK charts.

UK artist Jimmy Ray incorporated themes and aesthetics of rockabilly music into his image as well as his 1998 hit, Are You Jimmy Ray?, which Ray described as "popabilly hip-hop".

Singer-songwriter and actor Drake Bell recorded an album of rockabilly covers, Ready Steady Go!, in 2014. The album was produced by Brian Setzer, frontman of the rockabilly revival band The Stray Cats. The album sold over 2,000 copies in its first week of release, peaking at #182 on the Billboard 200, and received positive reviews from critics.

Neo-rockabilly UK band Restless, have played neo-rockabilly since the early 1980s. The style was to mix any popular music to a rockabilly set up, drums, slap bass and guitar. This was followed by many other artists at the time in London. Today, bands like Lower The Tone are more aligned to neo-rockabilly that suits popular music venues instead of the dedicated rockabilly clubs that expect only original rockabilly.

== Use of the term "rockabilly" ==
Early rockabilly singer Barbara Pittman told Experience Music Project that "Rockabilly was actually an insult to the southern rockers at that time. Over the years it has picked up a little dignity. It was their way of calling us 'hillbillies'."

One of the first written uses of the term rockabilly was in a press release describing Gene Vincent's "Be-Bop-A-Lula". Three weeks later, it was also used in a June 23, 1956, Billboard review of Ruckus Tyler's "Rock Town Rock".

The first record to contain the word rockabilly in a song title was "Rock a Billy Gal", issued in November 1956. The Burnette brothers had been playing a song called "Rock Billy Boogie" since 1953, but did not record or release it until 1956 and 1957, respectively.

The term is used in Japan as a way to name a subculture group associated with rebellious youth, and more loosely, with some yankī (ヤンキー) gangs. Rockabilly enthusiasts adopted slicked-back hair, leather jackets and retro American fashion, creating a subculture rooted in music, dance and nostalgia. As with yankī groups, they tend to stand out, embrace excess and reject conformity, though Rockabilly are less confrontational than them.

== Characteristic sound and techniques ==
Some effects and techniques strongly associated with rockabilly as a style include slapback, slapback echo, flutter echo, tape delay echo, echo, and reverb.

The distinctive reverberation on the early hit records such as "Rock Around The Clock" by Bill Haley & His Comets was created by recording the band under the domed ceiling of Decca's studio in New York, located in an echoing former ballroom called The Pythian Temple. This same studio would also be used to record other rockabilly musicians such as Buddy Holly and The Rock and Roll Trio. Memphis Recording Services Studio, where Sam Phillips recorded, had a sloped ceiling covered with corrugated tiles. This created some of the desired resonance, but Phillips used technical methods to create additional echo: the original signal from one tape machine was fed through a second machine with a split-second delay. The echo effect was noticeable on Wilf Carter records from the 1930s and in Eddy Arnold's "Cattle Call" (1945). When Elvis Presley left Phillips' Sun Records and recorded "Heartbreak Hotel" for RCA, the RCA producers placed microphones at the end of a hallway to achieve a similar effect. The echoing sound created the impression of a live show.

In comparison to country songs, rockabilly songs generally have simplified form, lyrics, chord progressions and arrangements, faster tempos, and amplified percussion. There is greater variability in lyrics and melodies, and the singing style is more flamboyant. Compared to rhythm and blues, fewer instruments are used, but percussion is amplified to fill in the sound. The singing style is less smooth and mannered.

== Rockabilly Hall of Fame ==
The original Rockabilly Hall of Fame was established by Bob Timmers on March 21, 1997, to present early rock and roll history and information relative to the original artists and personalities involved in this pioneering American music genre. It was headquartered in Nashville.

In 2000, an International Rock-A-Billy Hall of Fame and Museum was established in Jackson, Tennessee. In recent years, the works of both Halls of Fame have been absorbed by Jeffrey L. Cole, son of Bluegrass Pioneer and Rockabilly artist, Lee Cole. Cole's mission to carry forward the legacy of this Rock and Roll roots genre, with the newly established, Rockabilly Hall of Fame Museum. The Museum exists only on-line now, but with the goal of creating a physical space.

== See also ==
- List of rockabilly musicians
- Bluegrass music
- Boogie rock
- Folk music
- Folk rock
- Gothabilly
- Psychobilly
