= Rock with Bill Haley and the Comets =

Compilation album by Bill Haley & His Comets
- Released: 1955
- Recorded: Coastal Studios, New York City, 1952-53
- Genre: Rock and roll
- Label: Essex Records; reissued on many other labels
- Producer: Dave Miller

Bill Haley & His Comets chronology
Rock with Bill Haley and the Comets (1955)	Shake, Rattle and Roll (1956)

Rock with Bill Haley and the Comets is an early rock and roll music compilation album issued by Essex Records (ESLP 202) in December 1955, and featuring music by the titular group, Bill Haley & His Comets. The album features recordings made by Haley in 1952 and 1953, including his hits, "Rock the Joint", "Crazy Man Crazy" (Billboard, #12, Cashbox, #11), "Fractured" (Billboard, #24), and "Live It Up" (Billboard, #25).

== Content ==
All the songs on Rock with Bill Haley and the Comets were previously released as singles under the Essex banner, including several that were originally released when the band used the name Bill Haley and the Saddlemen. The album does not include any of the tracks Haley and the Comets recorded in 1954 before moving to Decca, nor are any of the tracks from 1951 to 1952 included that Haley recorded for Essex's sister label, Holiday Records (although later releases of Haley's Essex label work would include these tracks).

Essex leased this album out to numerous other labels that subsequently issued it under their own brand. This includes Somerset Records, Paragon Records, Reo Records, Transworld, and Quality Records. The album was released in the UK in 1962 by Pye Golden Guinea Records under the title Rock the Joint.

== Track listing ==
1. "Rock the Joint" (Harry Crafton, Wendell Keane, Harry Bagby)
2. "Rockin' Chair on the Moon" (Bill Haley, Harry Broomall)
3. "Farewell, So Long, Goodbye" (Bill Haley)
4. "Real Rock Drive" (Bill Haley)
5. "Fractured" (Bill Haley, Marshall Lytle)
6. "Stop Beatin' Round the Mulberry Bush" (Bickley Reichner, Clay Boland)
7. "Crazy Man Crazy" (Bill Haley)
8. "Pat-a-Cake" (Billy Williamson, Bill Haley)
9. "Live It Up!" (Bill Haley)
10. "What'cha Gonna Do" (Bill Haley)
11. "I'll Be True" (William McLemore)
12. "Dance with a Dolly" (Terry Shand, Jimmy Eaton, Mickey Leader)

== Personnel ==
The Comets

- Bill Haley – rhythm guitar, vocals
- Billy Williamson – steel guitar
- Johnny Grande – piano; organ on 11
- Marshall Lytle – double bass
- Dick Richards – backing vocals on 9, 11

Additional musicians

- Danny Cedrone – lead guitar on 1, 2, 4, 6, 12
- Art Ryerson – lead guitar on 3, 5, 7, 8, 9, 10, 11
- Billy Gussak – drums on 3, 4, 5, 6, 7, 8, 9, 10, 11
- Tony Lance – baritone saxophone on 3, 9, 11
- Dave Miller – clapboard on 11, backing vocals on 7

Note: no drums were used on tracks 1, 2, 12. According to the Haley biography Sound and Glory by John W. Haley and John von Hoelle (Dyne-American, 1990), numerous other individuals participated on backing vocals on 7, including record executive Jerry Blaine.
