= Dick Richards (drummer) =

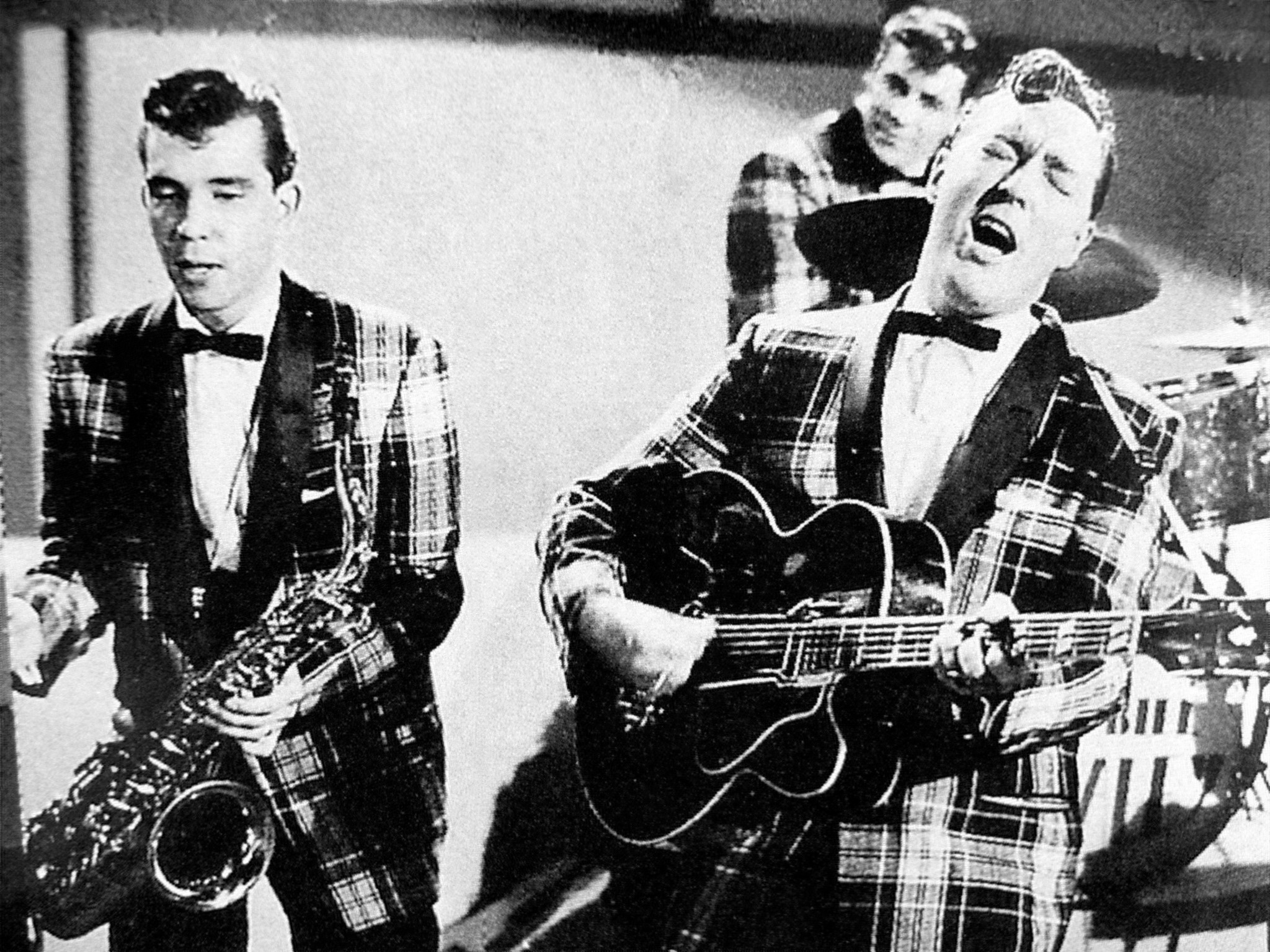
- Richards in 1954, seated behind Bill Haley

Background information
- Also known as: Dick Richards
- Born: Richard Marley Boccelli; February 12, 1924; Yeadon, Pennsylvania, US
- Died: July 12, 2019 (aged 95) Ocean City, New Jersey, US
- Genres: Rock and roll
- Occupations: Musician, actor
- Instrument: Drums
- Years active: 1954–2019
- Formerly of: Bill Haley & His Comets, The Jodimars

Richard Marley Boccelli (February 12, 1924 — July 12, 2019), also known as Dick Richards, was an American drummer and actor, best known for being in Bill Haley & His Comets, a group he was inducted into the Rock and Roll Hall of Fame as a member of in 2012.

== Early life and education ==
Dick Richards was born Richard Marley Boccelli in Yeadon, Pennsylvania. His father, Luigi Boccelli, was blind and worked as a tenor singer. He attended Upper Darby High School until 1949. Richards then attended Fairleigh Dickinson College, and finally West Chester University, where he majored in physical education, played for the American football team, and earned a teaching degree. As a teenager, he dated Grace Kelly.

== Career ==
In April 1954, Richards joined Bill Haley & His Comets as their drummer. A month later, they recorded their biggest song "Rock Around the Clock", however session player Billy Gussak played drums on the record instead of Richards. Richards left the Comets a year later, with Marshall Lytle and Joey Ambrose in September 1955, after they were refused a $50 raise from their manager; they formed the Jodimars, who toured until 1958.

In the 1960s, Richards took up acting. He performed on film, television, and theatre. He appeared on Broadway in the 1970s. Richards played a minor character in crime drama / soap opera show The Edge of Night, playing Charlie in 34 episodes of the show from 1980 to 1981, and played Henrick Schilinger in two episodes of the prison show Oz in 1998 and 1999.

Richards reunited with most of the Comet members in 1987, a few years after Bill Haley's death, and toured as "Bill Haley's Original Comets". Richards played drums in the Ready Rockers until his death.

== Awards ==
Richards was inducted into Upper Darby's Alumni Hall of Fame in 1999, the Pennsylvania Sports Hall of Fame in 2001, and in 2012 was awarded the key to the city of Ocean City.

In 1987, Bill Haley was posthumously inducted into the Rock and Roll Hall of Fame; at the time, backing bands were not included, meaning the Comets was not also inducted with Haley. This was changed in 2012, when it was announced that The Comets, along with many other backing bands from the 1950s such as the Blue Caps, the Crickets, the Famous Flames, the Midnighters, and the Miracles, were to be inducted into the Hall of Fame; Richards was inducted as a member of the Comets and attended the ceremony, hosted by Smokey Robinson.

== Personal life ==
Richards married his first wife, Elizabeth Kurtz (1930—1986) in 1950, and they remain married until her death in 1986. They had three children, one of whom died from cancer in 2011. They also have six grandchildren and a great-grandchild. Richards married his second wife, Shirley Kubaska, in 1986 and they were married until Dick's death.

After the Jodimars ended in 1958, he taught physical science at Springfield High School in Delaware and coached football from 1960 to 1963.

Boccelli died on July 12, 2019 in Ocean City, New Jersey, aged 95. He and his family had lived in Ocean City since 1963.
