= Real Rock Drive =

Single by Bill Haley and His Comets as Bill Haley with Haley's Comets
- Released: 1952
- Recorded: 1952
- Genre: Rock and roll
- Length: 2:24
- Label: Essex Records
- Songwriter: Bill Haley
- Producer: Dave Miller

Bill Haley and His Comets as Bill Haley with Haley's Comets singles chronology
"Rocking Chair on the Moon" (1952)	"Real Rock Drive" (1952)	"Crazy Man, Crazy" (1953)

"Real Rock Drive" was the title of an early rock and roll song written by, and first recorded by Bill Haley & His Comets under the name Bill Haley with Haley's Comets in 1952. The song was released as an Essex Records 78 single.

== History ==
The music and the lyrics were written by Bill Haley.

The song was recorded in Chester, Pennsylvania, and was released by Essex Records as a B-side of a single in November, 1952. Personnel on the recording included Haley's core Comets members Marshall Lytle (bass), Billy Williamson (steel guitar), and Johnny Grande (piano), plus session musicians Danny Cedrone (lead guitar) and Billy Gussak (drums).

The recording was released on Essex Records as Essex 310 backed with "Stop Beatin' Round the Mulberry Bush". The recording was also released on Trans-Word Records as 718 backed with "Yes, Indeed". The single did not chart.

The recording was also released on London Records as a 78 single in Germany as L20069 in 1957.

The song was based on "Tennessee Jive" by Tani Allen and His Tennessee Pals with vocals by Buck Turner, released in 1950 on Bullet Records in Nashville, Tennessee. A plagiarism suit was brought by the publisher of the song, Volunteer Music. The song was written by Buck Turner. This resulted in no songwriter or publisher being credited on the Essex record label.

== Cover versions ==
The California-based band The Blasters have recorded the song on the 1980 American Music album. Phil Haley and his Comments, The Starliters, The Rhythm Hogs, Little Caesar, and Rusti Steel and The Star Tones have also recorded or performed the song.

== Sources ==
- Jim Dawson, Rock Around the Clock: The Record That Started the Rock Revolution! (Backbeat Books, 2005), pp. 50–55.
- John W. Haley and John von Hoelle, Sound and Glory (Dyne-American, 1990).
- John Swenson, Bill Haley: The Daddy of Rock and Roll (Stein & Day, 1985).
