= Fractured (Bill Haley song) =

Single by Bill Haley with Haley's Comets
- Released: 1953
- Recorded: 1953
- Genre: Rock and roll
- Length: 2:12
- Label: Essex Records
- Songwriters: Bill Haley, Marshall Lytle
- Producer: Dave Miller

Bill Haley with Haley's Comets singles chronology
"Crazy Man, Crazy" (1953)	"Fractured" (1953)	"Live It Up" (1953)

"Fractured" is an early rock and roll song written by Bill Haley and Marshall Lytle and first recorded by Bill Haley & His Comets, then going by the name Bill Haley with Haley's Comets, in 1953. The song was released as an Essex Records 78 single in 1953, peaking at #24 on the Billboard singles chart.

== History ==
The music and the lyrics were written by Bill Haley and Marshall Lytle.

The song was recorded at Redo Art Studios, Philadelphia, Pennsylvania and was released by Essex Records as a B side single in July, 1953. The personnel on the recording included Haley's core Comets members Marshall Lytle (bass), Billy Williamson (steel guitar), and Johnny Grande (piano), plus session musicians Art Ryerson (lead guitar) and Billy Gussak (drums).

The recording was released on Essex Records as Essex 327B backed with "Pat-a-Cake".

The term "fractured" was a popular slang expression of that time, which like the earlier "crazy, man, crazy", was chosen as the title of the song to appeal to teenage record buyers.

== Charts ==
"Fractured" was a Top 40 hit on the Billboard pop singles chart, reaching #24 in August, 1953.

== Sources ==
- Jim Dawson, Rock Around the Clock: The Record That Started the Rock Revolution! (Backbeat Books, 2005), pp. 50–55.
- John W. Haley and John von Hoelle, Sound and Glory (Dyne-American, 1990).
- John Swenson, Bill Haley: The Daddy of Rock and Roll (Stein & Day, 1985).
