= Live It Up (Bill Haley song) =

Single by Bill Haley and His Comets as Bill Haley with Haley's Comets
- Released: 1953
- Recorded: 1953
- Genre: Rock and roll
- Length: 2:54
- Label: Essex Records
- Songwriter(s): Bill Haley
- Producer(s): Dave Miller

Bill Haley and His Comets as Bill Haley with Haley's Comets singles chronology
"Fractured" (1953)	"Live It Up" (1953)	"I'll Be True" (1953)

"Live It Up" was the title of an early rock and roll song written by Bill Haley and first recorded by Bill Haley & His Comets under the name Bill Haley with Haley's Comets in 1953. The song was released as an Essex Records 78 single in 1953, peaking at #25 on the Billboard singles chart

== History ==
The music and the lyrics were written by Bill Haley.

The song was recorded at Redo Art Studios, Philadelphia, Pennsylvania and was released by Essex Records as an A side single in October, 1953. The personnel on the recording included Haley's core Comets members Marshall Lytle (bass), Billy Williamson (steel guitar), Johnny Grande (piano), and Joey D'Ambrosio (tenor or baritone saxophone), plus session musicians Art Ryerson (lead guitar) and Billy Gussak (drums).

This was Joey D'Ambrosio's first recording with Bill Haley, introducing the saxophone, which would become an essential component of the Bill Haley and Comets sound, moving away from the country and western steel guitar. This single was significant because it inaugurated a new sax inflected sound for the band, creating their signature musical motif.

The recording was released on Essex Records as Essex 332A backed with "Farewell, So Long, Goodbye", a song which also featured the saxophone.

Johnny Kay's Rockets released a recording of the song on the 2009 CD Johnny Kay: Tale of a Comet on Hydra.

== Charts ==
"Live It Up" was a Top 40 hit on the Billboard pop singles chart, reaching #25 in October, 1953 in a one-week chart run.

== Sources ==
- Jim Dawson, Rock Around the Clock: The Record That Started the Rock Revolution! (Backbeat Books, 2005), pp. 50–55.
- John W. Haley and John von Hoelle, Sound and Glory (Dyne-American, 1990).
- John Swenson, Bill Haley: The Daddy of Rock and Roll (Stein & Day, 1985).
