= The Soul of Spain =

Studio album by 101 Strings
- Released: 1958
- Genre: Easy listening
- Label: Stereo Fidelity, Somerset

The Soul of Spain is an album by 101 Strings. It was released in 1958 on the Stereo Fidelity and Somerset Records labels (catalog no. SF-6600).

The album debuted on Billboard magazine's popular album chart on May 25, 1959, peaked at No. 9, and remained on that chart for 32 weeks. In February 1960, Billboard established a special chart for discount albums, the Best Selling Low Price LPs chart. The Soul of Spain held the No. 1 spot for 46 of the 47 weeks that Billboard published the special chart.

The success of The Soul of Spain led to a follow-up album, The Soul of Spain Volume II (catalog no. P-9900), which debuted on the Billboard popular albums chart on January 9, 1961, peaked at No. 21, and remained on the chart for four weeks. The 101 String continued the "Soul" series with additional albums, including "Soul of Mexico" (1962), "Soul of Erin" (1965), "Soul of Israel" (1967), and "Soul of South America".

== Track listing (Volume I) ==
Side A

1. "Malaguena"
2. "Domingo En Seville (Sunday in Seville)
3. "Espana"

Side B

1. "Macarenas (Patron Saint of the Matadors)"
2. "La Violetera"
3. "Espana Cani"

== Track listing (Volume II) ==
Side A

1. "The Breeze and I"
2. "Matador"
3. "Le Cid"
4. "Valencia"

Side B

1. "Granada"
2. "El Relicario"
3. "Cantina Toreros"
