= Crazy Man, Crazy =

Single by Bill Haley and His Comets
- B-side: "Whatcha Gonna Do"
- Released: April 25, 1953
- Recorded: April 1953
- Genre: Rock and roll
- Length: 2:07
- Label: Essex Records, Essex 321
- Songwriters: Bill Haley; Marshall Lytle (uncredited)
- Producer: Dave Miller

Bill Haley and His Comets singles chronology
"Real Rock Drive" (1952)	"Crazy Man, Crazy" (1953)	"Fractured" (1953)

"Crazy Man, Crazy" was the title of an early rock and roll song written by, and first recorded by Bill Haley & His Comets in April 1953. It is notable as the first recognized rock and roll recording to appear on the national American musical charts, peaking at #15 on the Billboard singles chart for the week ending May 23, 1953, and #11 for two weeks on the Cash Box chart beginning for the week of June 13.

Some sources indicate that the recording—a blend of R&B, western and pop music—is a contender for the title of the first rock and roll record. Others state that it was merely "the first rock and roll song to be a hit on the pop charts". It was also said to be the first rock and roll recording to be played on national television in the United States (in an episode of Omnibus in 1953). The Rock and Roll Hall of Fame considers the song "an original amalgam of country and R&B that arguably became the first rock and roll record to register on Billboard's pop chart".

The appearance of a comma (or two) in the title varies from source to source. A single comma, after the word "man", is present on the title of the original single release, which is credited to "Bill Haley with Haley's Comets," an early variant of the band's name. Subsequent releases are sometimes rendered as "Crazy, Man, Crazy" with a vocative comma—which is the grammatically correct title, given the original context of the phrase from which the song originates—and sometimes there are no commas included in the song's title at all.

== History ==
The song was written by Bill Haley. Haley said in a 1967 interview with Vancouver, British Columbia DJ Red Robinson that he got the idea for the song from hearing popular catchphrases used by teenagers at school dances where he and his band performed. One of these phrases was "Crazy Man Crazy" while another was "Go, go, go, everybody!" (the latter also featured in a song called "Go Go Go" by the Treniers which music historian Jim Dawson suggests may have been an influence). Haley (and Marshall Lytle) incorporated both phrases into the song. He is said to have written it sitting at the kitchen table while his wife prepared lunch.

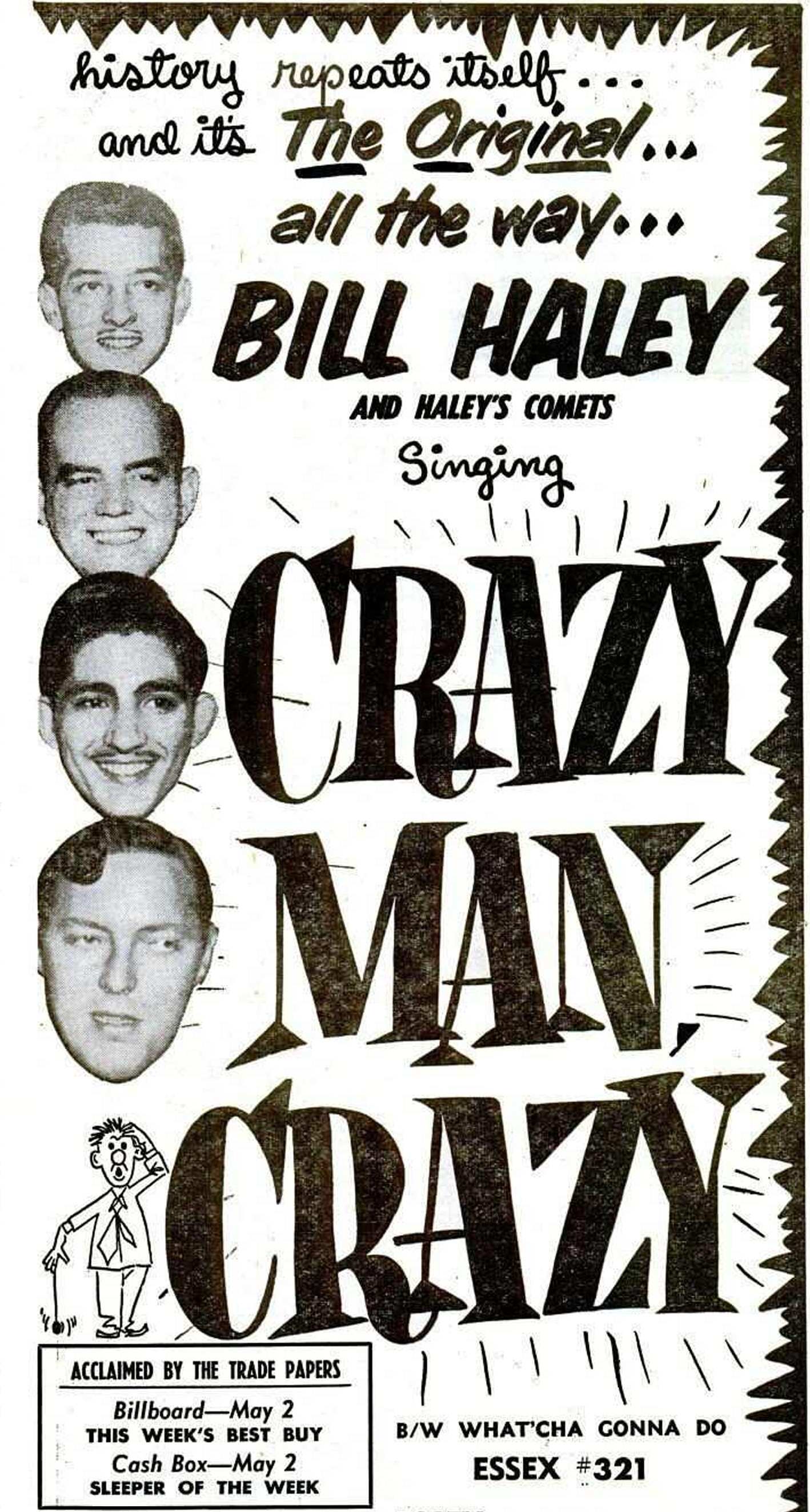
Billboard advertisement, May 9, 1953

The song was recorded at Coastal Studios in New York City and was released soon after by Essex Records. Personnel on the recording included Haley's core Comets members (Lytle, Billy Williamson [steel guitar], and Johnny Grande [piano]), plus session musicians Art Ryerson (lead guitar) and Billy Gussak (drums). Also participating on backing vocals were Dave Miller (owner of Essex Records and Haley's producer) and Jerry Blaine, co-founder of Jubilee Records, who happened to be visiting the studio. (Miller and Blaine were recruited because of the need to create a rowdy party-like sound during the song's chorus and conclusion.) On May 23, 1953, the song entered the American Billboard chart and reached No. 12, becoming the first song generally recognised as rock and roll to be a pop hit. The record was the Top Debut on the Cashbox chart for the week of May 23, 1953, debuting at no. 19. This was also Haley's first national success and his first major success with an original song (prior to this he had had regional success with cover versions of "Rocket 88" and "Rock the Joint").

The recording was also a crossover hit, reaching no. 10 on the Billboard Territorial Best Sellers Chart for R&B records in Chicago. A cover version released on Modern by R&B guitarist Lucky Enois with his Quintet was also reviewed in the Rhythm & Blues Record Reviews section in the same issue as "full of infectious excitement" and a "loot catcher".

Essex Records ran a full-page ad in the April 25, 1953 Billboard magazine stating that the single had sold "over 100,000 in 15 days". A photo of Bill Haley, Marshall Lytle, Billy Williamson, and Johnny Grande accompanied the ad.

The recording was released on Essex Records as Essex 321, E-321-A, backed with "Whatcha Gonna Do" by Bill Haley with Haley's Comets and was published by Eastwick Music, BMI. The record was manufactured by the Palda Record Company of Philadelphia, Pennsylvania in 78 and 45 formats with an orange label. The recording was also released in the UK in August 1953, as London L 1190 as a 78 with "Whatcha Gonna Do" as the B-side.

1953 sheet music cover, Eastwick Music Co., Philadelphia, PA.

In the summer of 1953, "Crazy Man, Crazy" became the first rock and roll song to be heard on national television in the United States when it was used on the soundtrack of Glory in the Flower, an installment of the CBS anthology series, Omnibus. This live production featured James Dean and was a predecessor to his later Rebel Without a Cause. The Paley Center for Media maintains a copy of this production in its archives.

Bill Haley and the Comets performed the song in the 1954 Universal International movie short Roundup of Rhythm, which was the motion picture debut of the band in a musical short directed by Will Cowan that featured a D.J. and his female guest introducing the Comets. This film is regarded as the first rock and roll movie feature predating The Blackboard Jungle (1955) and Rock Around the Clock (1956). The band also performed the song in the 1961 Mexican film Besito a Papa (1961) directed by José Díaz Morales made by Cinematográfica Filmex S.A. and released on September 14, 1961. The film starred Mexican actress Lola Beltran.

Haley would later claim (for example in a 1972 interview with CFQC Radio in Saskatoon, Canada) that "Crazy Man, Crazy" sold a million copies, however no evidence to support this claim has been located. Haley and the Comets would record new versions of the song (without notable commercial success) in 1960 (Warner Bros. Records) and 1972 (Sonet Records), plus a live performance in 1969 (Buddah/Kama Sutra Records). A 45 single was released on Radio Active Gold distributed by Buddah Records produced by Richard Nader. After Haley's death, surviving members of The Comets (which included Marshall Lytle) recorded new versions of the song in 1997 (Rockstar Records), 2000 (Rollin Rock Records) and 2002 (Bradley House Records).

August, 1953 78 single release in the UK on London Records as L.1190.

The Original Comets featuring Dick Richards on drums and Joey Ambrose on lead vocals performed the song live on July 5, 2014, at the Wildest Cats concert in the UK with Jacko Buddin on lead guitar.

== Cover versions ==
Ralph Marterie and his Orchestra also had a major hit with their version in 1953 as Mercury 70153, which Cashbox paired with the Bill Haley recording on July 4, 1953, peaking at #11. Marterie reached no. 13 on the Billboard Jockey chart with his version for the week ending June 20, 1953. It is sometimes claimed that sax player Rudy Pompilli, later to join the Comets, was on this record, but there is no evidence of this. Ralph Marterie's recording was #93 on the Billboard Top 100 Records of 1953. The Ralph Marterie version on Mercury, Mercury 70153, with vocals by Larry Regan and the Smarty-Airs, backed with "Go Away", was also released on Oriole, CB. 1199, in the UK and Deutsche Austroton, M 70153.

A May 23, 1953 Billboard magazine article noted that Lucky Anois had recorded a version of "Crazy Man, Crazy" on the Modern Records label.

Rockabilly singer Robert Gordon recorded a version in the 1970s which was on the Bad Boy (1980) and Robert Gordon is Red Hot (1989) albums.

In Britain, a contemporary cover was issued by former band singer Lita Roza with Ted Heath (bandleader) and His Music on Decca, Decca F10144, in July, 1953, backed with "Oo! What you Do to Me".

A German-language version was recorded in 1954 by Renee Franke with the Max Greger Band on Polydor, Polydor 23078. Max Greger was a German jazz saxophonist and bandleader who has performed with Louis Armstrong.

Bernie Saber and his Orchestra recorded a version on Tunepac Records, as Tunepac 5002, with Ray Brankey on vocals in 1954. Bernie Saber co-wrote, with Robert Noel, "Good Things from the Garden", which was the Jolly Green Giant jingle: "From the valley of the jolly--ho, ho, ho!!--green giant!"

Billy Jack Wills, the brother of Bob Wills, recorded the song in 1953, a recording which was re-released in 1999 on the Crazy, Man, Crazy album collection.

The R&B group the Lucky Enois Quintet released the song in 1953 on Modern.

Erwin Lehn and Suedfunk-Tanzorchester released a version in 1955 on Deutsche Columbia as EP 21-7518 entitled "Nur Für Tänzer".

American-born Swedish musician Ernie Englund and his Crazy Men recorded the song in 1953 and released it as a 78 single on Karusell K45 b/w "Minka" in Sweden, which is regarded as the first rock and roll record released in Sweden.

In 1991, Chimbo's Revival released the song as a 45 picture sleeve single on High Mountain Records.

Bill Haley's Comets and The Original Band, Bill Haley's Original Comets, have also recorded the song. Marshall Lytle has performed the song in concert with Bill Haley, Jr. and the Comets with Bill Turner and The Blue Smoke Band. Bill Haley, Jr. has recorded and also performed the song live in concert. Johnny Kay's Rockets released a recording of the song on the 2009 CD album on Hydra: Johnny Kay: Tale of a Comet.

Phil Haley and the Comments have recorded the song and performed it live in concert in 2008, with the performances available on YouTube.

A player piano version was recorded by J. Lawrence Cook which was originally issued as QRS 8980 and reissued as part of a 3-song medley entitled "Bill Haley Hits No. 1" on QRS XP-440.

R&B saxophonist Big Jay McNeely released an answer record ("Nervous Man Nervous") on Federal Records as 12141 as a 78 rpm 10-inch shellac and a 7-inch 45 rpm single in August, 1953 featuring the chorus from "Crazy Man, Crazy" and the "go, go, go, go, go, go" refrain.

A 1953 advertisement for an appearance by Bill Haley and the Comets at the Hofbrau Hotel in Wildwood, New Jersey noted that the Hamilton Trio danced to "Crazy Man Crazy" on the Your Show of Shows TV program and that Danny Kaye, Ralph Marterie, The Ravens, and the Mellowaires had "jumped" on the song.

The Danish band The Hellions released an A side 45 single version in 1965 on Odeon/EMI.

Finnish singer Esa Pakarinen released the song as a 45 single in 1976 as "Hullu Mies Hullu" on Polydor.

The Stargazers recorded the song in 1991 on the Back in Orbit album.

Tim Timebomb released an instrumental version on the Pirates Press label in 2012. He also released a version with vocals on Hellcat.

Hank Biggs and The Hardtops released a version on the 2013 album Lucky Streak.

Eddie Rivers of Asleep at the Wheel recorded a version in 2013 on the Plain Talkin' Man album.

The Lake Travis Fiddlers featuring Ray Benson recorded a version on the 2016 I Hear You Talkin' album.

== Sources ==
- Jim Dawson, Rock Around the Clock: The Record That Started the Rock Revolution! (Backbeat Books, 2005), pp. 50–55.
- John W. Haley and John von Hoelle, Sound and Glory (Dyne-American, 1990).
- John Swenson, Bill Haley: The Daddy of Rock and Roll (Stein & Day, 1985).
- Rockabilly Hall of Fame website with information on the history of "Crazy Man, Crazy."
- Billboard, June 27, 1953, page 30, Most Played in Juke Boxes Chart.
