= 101 Strings =

- Promotional copy of first 101 Strings album, 1957

Background information
- Genre: Easy listening
- Years active: 1957–1981
- Labels: Essex Records, Somerset, Alshire

101 Strings Orchestra was the brand for a highly successful easy listening symphonic music organization, with a discography exceeding 150 albums over 24 years, beginning in 1957. 101 Strings had a trademark sound, focusing on melody with a laid-back ambiance most often featuring strings. Its LPs were individualized by the slogan "The Sound of Magnificence", a puffy cloud logo and a sepia-toned photo of the orchestra. The 101 Strings orchestra included 124 string instruments and was initially conducted by Wilhelm Stephan. The orchestra's famous official photograph was taken in the Musikhalle Hamburg.

== History ==
=== Miller and rock and roll ===
Record label mogul David L. Miller came to prominence by releasing the first Bill Haley & His Comets’ records in 1952–1953 on his own Essex label (followed by Trans-World, then Somerset Records). In this capacity, Miller played a role in the creation of rock and roll.

=== Miller and 101 Strings ===
Following the rise of easy listening (practitioners of which included Mantovani and Jackie Gleason Presents), Miller subcontracted the Orchester des Nordwestdeutschen Rundfunks Hamburg (the Northwest German Radio Orchestra of Hamburg) conducted by Wilhelm Stephan to play in-house arrangements of popular standards. The first three 101 Strings albums were released in November 1957, and twelve more titles were released in 1958 (many of which featured recycled material from earlier albums attributed to the New World Orchestra, Rio Carnival Orchestra, and other light music orchestras). These records were pressed by Miller's own plants and released through his own distribution channels (such as grocery stores).

His core staff arrangers were Monty Kelly, Joseph Francis Kuhn, and Robert Lowden. All three proved adept at writing original compositions that were stylistically consistent both with contemporary hit songs and each other. Miller placed these on 101 Strings albums to provide additional publishing revenues.

Kelly's earliest successes were Latin and Spanish travelogues (such as the "Soul of Spain" series), although he became 101 Strings' "Now Sound" specialist following the British Invasion. Kuhn concentrated on radio-friendly numbers in the "Pops"'s orchestral manner ("Blues Pizzicato", etc.) which provided Somerset its initial catalog of originals. Lowden composed lounge ballads (such as "Blue Twilight"). The orchestra's body of early 1960s work, including recordings under the names of the Cinema Sound Stage Orchestra and the Zero Zero Seven Band, was recycled via re-release throughout the next twenty years.

=== Sherman and 101 Strings ===
In 1964, Miller sold the franchise to Al Sherman, a successful record label distributor, who renamed the label Alshire (based in Los Angeles) and moved recording to London. Sherman retained Miller as a partner to oversee production and A&R. The Alshire era is characterized by large-scale expansion of product, attempts to branch out to younger markets and beginning in 1969, eventual stagnation (although late efforts by Les Baxter and Nelson Riddle were released under the 101 Strings name in 1970's). Output decreased from 1974 on. A tribute to John Lennon (composed of earlier Beatles tribute material – 101 Strings play Hits written by The Beatles) in January 1981 marked the final 101 Strings effort.

Many 101 Strings albums are simply orchestrated versions of pop hits and show tunes, although the early Somerset material contains many examples of the exotica and lounge genres. East of Suez (1959), In a Hawaiian Paradise (1960), and Songs of the Seasons in Japan (1964) are three such albums. 101 Strings Play the Blues (1958) and Back Beat Symphony were early experiments in symphonic-pop hybridization, while Fly Me to the Moon (1961) contains five noir-ish originals. Alshire releases include ‘Now Sound’ albums such as The Sounds and Songs of the Jet Set (1965), Sounds of Today (1967), and Astro-Sounds from Beyond the Year 2000 (1969), the last of which has been frequently sampled by electronic music artists of the 1990s and 2000s decades.

=== Current ownership ===
The current owner is Countdown Media, a subsidiary of BMG Rights Management.

=== Sales ===
In the 24 years of its existence, 101 Strings sold more than 50,000,000 records worldwide.

== Chart hits ==
The orchestra had five hit albums in the UK, including one number one.

- Gypsy Campfires (1958) #9
- The Soul of Spain (1958) #17
- Ferde Grofe's Grand Canyon Suite (1958) #10
- Down Drury Lane to Memory Lane (1960) #1
- Morning Noon and Night (1983) #32

== Discography ==
Original releases during the group's existence from 1957 to 1981. Subsequent releases under the 101 Strings name consist of rereleases, compilations, and material licensed from other performers and are not included.

- 101 Strings in a Symphony for Lovers (1957)
- 101 Strings Play the World's Great Standards (1957)
- A Night in the Tropics (1957)
- 101 Strings Play the Blues (1958)
- Gypsy Campfires (1958)
- The Emotion of 101 Strings at Gypsy Campfires (1958)
- Award Winning Scores from the Silver Screen (1958)
- Ferde Grofe's Grand Canyon Suite (1958)
- The Glory of Christmas (1958)
- 101 Strings Play the Sugar & Spice of Rudolph Friml (1958)
- 101 Strings Play Hit American Waltzes (1958)
- 101 Strings Play Hits from Pal Joey (1958) (back cover adds and The Red Mill)
- A Night in Vienna (1958)
- A Night Serenade in the Quiet Hours (1958)
- Opera Without Words (1958)
- A Bridal Bouquet The World's Most Beautiful Wedding Songs (1958)
- Concerto Under the Stars (1958) (rereleased as Concertos for Lovers)
- Soul of Music U.S.A. (1958)
- The Soul of Spain (1958)
- The Soul of Spain, Volume 2 (1958)
- Russian Fireworks (1959)
- East of Suez (1959)
- Porgy and Bess (1959)
- The Rivieras : 101 Strings on a Mediterranean Cruise (1959)
- 101 Years of Familiar Songs America Loves (1960)
- 25 Years of Show Hits (1960)
- 101 Strings in a Hawaiian Paradise (1960)
- Down Drury Lane to Memory Lane (1960)
- I Love Paris (1960)
- Rhapsody (1960)
- Soul of the Blues (1960)
- Richard Rodgers Lorenz Hart (1960) (disc label reads "Roger - Hart) (rereleased in 1972 as "Rogers and Hart", orchestra not credited; rereleased in 1973 minus "I Could Write a Book" as "Million Seller Broadway Hits")
- Back Beat Symphony (1961)
- Exodus and Other Great Movie Themes (1961)
- Fly Me to the Moon (1961) (cover reads Songs When We're Alone... Fly Me to the Moon)
- Smash Hits from The Music Man (1961)
- The Stephen Foster Songbook (1961)
- A World of Romance (1961) (reel-to-reel tape with selections from six previous albums)
- Italian Hits (1961)
- Camelot (1962)
- Inspiration and Meditation (1962) (disc label reads "Songs of Inspiration and Meditation")
- The Soul of Mexico (1962)
- With Love from London (1962)
- Million Seller Hit Songs of the 60's (1963)
- 101 Key Mortier Dance Organ, St. Albans Organ Museum (1964)
- Invitation to Dreams (1964)
- I Left My Heart in 101 Strings (1964) (Japanese release)
- I Left My Heart in San Francisco (1964)
- The Magic of Strings After Dark (1964) (disc label reads Strings After Dark)
- Million Seller Hit Songs of the 30's (1964)
- Million-Seller Hit Songs of the 40's (1964)
- Million-Seller Hit Songs of the 50's (1964?) (rereleased minus 2 tracks in 1976 as 50's Style)
- Songs of the Seasons in Japan (1964)
- Victor Young Leroy Anderson (1964)
- The Sounds and Songs of the Jet Set (1965)
- Paul Griffin Swings with 101 Strings (1965)
- My Fair Lady (1965)
- Fire and Romance of South America (1965)
- Cole Porter (1965)
- Concertos U.S.A. (1966)
- The Wonderful World of Walt Disney (1966)
- 101 Strings Plus Guitars Galore (1966)
- The Best Loved Songs of Irving Berlin (1966)
- Fiesta Español (1966)
- John Philip Sousa George M. Cohan (1966)
- Million Seller Hits of 1966 (1966)
- Richard Rodgers Oscar Hammerstein (1966)
- Sigmund Romberg Rudolf Friml (1966)
- The Soul of Erin (1966)
- Victor Herbert (1966)
- The Tijuana Sound (1967)
- Million Seller Hits from the Golden Age of the Bands (1967)
- 101 Strings Play Million Seller Hits – Volume 1 (1967)
- 101 Strings Play Million Seller Hits – Volume 2 (1967)
- 101 Strings Play Million Seller Hits – Volume 3 (1967)
- 101 Strings Plays Hit Songs for Girls (1967)
- Songs from George M. Cohan That Is (1967) (back cover reads 101 Strings Play Hit Songs from George M. and New York - The Good Old Days)
- Songs of Faith (1967)
- Songs of Love (1967)
- The Soul of Israel (1967)
- Million Seller Hits from Mexico (1967)
- The Romance of Magic Island (1967)
- Swingin' Things from 101 Strings (1967) (originally released in 1961 as The Soul of Harlem credited to Orchestra del Oro)
- S.R.O. Broadway Hits (Standing Room Only) (1967)
- Sounds of Today (1967)
- Spanish Eyes and Other Romantic Songs (1967)
- El Alma de Rusia (1967)
- Best Known Themes from the World's Great Composers (1967)
- Best Known Themes from the World's Great Composers (1967) (2-LP version; 2nd LP released in 1968 as Million Seller Themes from the Heart of Tchaikovsky)
- Love is Blue (L'Amour Est Bleu) (1967)
- Family Pop Concert (1967)
- After a Hard Day – Music to Relax By (1967) (back of cover reads Music to Relax By After a Hard Day; disc label reads 101 Strings Play Music to Relax By)
- 101 Strings with Twin Pianos – Million Seller Hits (1968)
- Round the World in Stereo with 101 Strings (1968)
- 101 Strings Play Hits Written by The Beatles (1968)
- 101 Strings Play Love Is Blue (1968)
- 101 Strings Featuring Hits Made Famous by The Supremes (1968)
- Million Seller Hits of Today (1968)
- Astro-Sounds from Beyond the Year 2000 (1968)
- Concert in Vienna (1968)
- Million Seller Themes from the Heart of Tchaikovsky (1968) (also released as 2nd LP in 2-LP version of Best Known Themes from the World's Great Composers)
- Fuego y Romance de Ernesto Lecuona (1968)
- Here Come the Birds (1968)
- Valley of the Dolls and Other Academy Award Hits! (1968)
- Come Sail with Me (1969)
- Gold Award Hits (1969)
- Lullabies for Baby (1969)
- Million Seller Hits of 1969 (1969)
- 101 Strings Play Romantic Songs of the Sea (1969)
- 101 Strings Plus Guitars Galore, Volume 2 (1969)
- 101 Strings Plus One (1969)
- 101 Strings Plus Trumpet (1969)
- 101 Strings Plus Accordion (1969)
- 101 Strings Play Songs for Lovers on a Summer Night (1969)
- 101 Strings Play the World's Most Famous Continental Tangos (1969)
- 101 Strings Plays Hits of Today (1969)
- 101 Strings Play Hit Songs from Finian's Rainbow Funny Girl Chitty Chitty Bang Bang (1969)
- 101 Strings Play Hits Made Famous by Nat King Cole (1969)
- 101 Strings Play Million Seller Hits of Today (1969)
- 101 Strings Play Music from Oliver! and Other Original English Melodies (1969)
- 101 Strings Play Music from the Paramount Picture Paint Your Wagon (1969)
- 101 Strings Play Million Seller Hits of Today Written by Simon and Garfunkel (1969)
- The Sounds of Love (1969)
- 101 Strings Play Songs of England (1970)
- 101 Strings Plays Songs of England (1970)
- Around the World with 101 Strings/De Luxe (1970)
- The "Exotic" Sounds of Love (1970)
- Greatest Hits of Ray Charles (1970)
- Million Seller Hits Arranged and Conducted by Les Baxter (1970)
- Nelson Riddle Arranges and Conducts 101 Strings (1970)
- Original Johann Strauss Waltzes (1970) (originally released in 1958 credited to The Danube Strings)
- 'POP' Classics (1970)
- The Romance of Hawaii (1970)
- The Power and the Glory (with The Tabernacle Choir) (1970)
- Que Mango! (with Les Baxter) (1970)
- Temas Célebres del Cine (1970)
- African Safari - The Activity and Excitement of an Actual Big Game Hunt! (1971)
- Discos de Oro (1971)
- Hit Songs from Hit Movies (1971)
- Million Seller Hits (1971) (title on disc label reads More Million Seller Hits)
- The Soul of Spain, Volume 3 (1971)
- Spectacular Brass!!! Fantastic Reeds!!! and the Magnificent 101 Strings : Nelson Riddle with Americas Top Soloists (1971)
- Theme from Love Story and Other Songs of Love (1971)
- A Waltz to Remember (1971)
- 101 Strings Orchestra Plays Songs Written by Carole King (1972) (disc label reads A Portrait of Carole)
- 101 Strings Play Million Seller Hits – Volume 4 (1972)
- 101 Strings Plus Dynamic Percussion - An Experience in Sound (1972) (originally released in 1960 as Motion in Percussion and Orchestra credited to the Hollywood Pops Orchestra)
- 101 Strings Plus Guitars (1972)
- 101 Strings Plus the Sensuous Sounds of the Trumpet (1972) (originally released in 1958 as I'm in the Mood credited to Billy Butterfield and His Orchestra)
- 101 Strings under the Direction of Monty Kelly (1972) (album cover lists entire contents after 101 Strings Play)
- 101 Strings with Romantic Piano at Cocktail Time - featuring Pietro Dero (1972)
- Award Hits from Broadway and Hollywood (1972)
- Country Music Hall of Fame (1972)
- Down Memory Lane - For the Young at Heart (1972)
- Fiddler on the Roof (1972)
- George Gershwin (1972)
- Gigi and Other Romantic Selections (1972)
- Gone but Not Forgotten (1972)
- Hank Williams & Other Country Greats (1972) (back cover reads Songs of Hank Williams and Other Country Greats)
- Hit Songs Written by Bacharach and Webb (1972)
- Hits from the Rock Opera Jesus Christ Super Star and Other Original Songs (1972)
- Hoagy Carmichael Duke Ellington (1972)
- Instrumental Music from the Ross Hunter Production Lost Horizon and Other Selections (1972)
- Japanese Folk Songs - 101 Strings Featuring the Shakuhachi (Bamboo Flute) with Katsuya Yokoyama (1972)
- The Magnificent Waltz (1972)
- Man of La Mancha and Other Hits (1972)
- Million Seller Country Hits (1972)
- Million Seller Hits from Paint Your Wagon My Fair Lady Camelot Gigi (1972)
- Million Seller Hits from Porgy and Bess An American in Paris Rhapsody in Blue Swanee (1972)
- Million Seller Latin Dance Hits (1972)
- Million Sellers from the Movies (1972)
- More Million Seller Hits of Today (1972)
- Movie Hits and Other Romantic Songs (1972)
- Movie Themes (1972)
- Music from Doctor Zhivago with Other Favorite Russian Melodies (1972) (originally released in 1966 as Sound Track Music from Doctor Zhivago credited to the Cinema Sound Stage Orchestra)
- Music from Fiddler on the Roof and Other Songs (1972)
- Polkas (1972) (disc label reads 101 Strings Play Polkas)
- Romantic Hits from the Operettas and Musical Comedies (1972)
- Soul of Greece (1972)]
- The Soul of Israel, Volume 2 (1972)
- The Soul of Poland (1972)
- The Soul of Scotland (1972)
- The Sound of Henry Mancini (1972)
- Theme from Shaft (1972)
- Today's Hits (1972)
- Trumpet A Go-Go Vol 2 (1972)
- Wagons West (1972)
- Western Themes (1972) (disc label reads Western Themes Vol. I)
- Western Themes Volume II (1972)
- Who Can Forget? (1972)
- 101 Strings Orchestra Plays Movie Themes and Other Songs (1973)
- 101 Strings Play One Tin Soldier and Other Hits (1973) (title from back cover; front cover lists entire contents)
- Best Loved Waltzes - Johann Strauss, Jr. (1973)
- Big Band Hits Vol. 1 (1973)
- Day by Day (1973)
- The Golden Age of the Romantics (1973)
- Golden Oldies of the 101 Strings (1973)
- Golden Oldies Vol. 2 (1973)
- Golden Oldies Vol. 3 (1973)
- Greatest Hits of the 101 Strings (1973)
- Last Tango in Paris and Other Songs of Love (1973)
- Piano Concertos and Rhapsodies with the 101 Strings (1973)
- A Portrait of 'The Lady' (1973)
- Spain (1973)
- Tom Sawyer (1973)
- Tour to the Sun (1973)
- The Fire and Romance of the Gypsies (1973)
- 101 Strings Play a Program of Duke Ellington Compositions and Other Selection - In Tribute (1974)
- 101 Strings Play More Million Sellers and Original Scores (1974)
- 101 Strings Play Some Hits Made Famous by Gladys Knight and Stevie Wonder (1974)
- Appointment in London (1974)
- Around the World with the 101 Strings (1974)
- Big Band Hits Vol. 2 (1974)
- Entertainment - Music from the Movies (1974)
- Hit Sounds - New and Old (1974)
- International Tangos (1974)
- Million Dollar Movie Hits and Other Original Selections (1974)
- Million Seller Movie Themes and Other Selections (1974)
- San Francisco – City of Romance (1974)
- WXTZ - A Profile of Sound (1974) (promotional album for an Indianapolis, Indiana radio station)
- America in Song (1975) (title from disc label; front cover reads 101 Strings and Others Play America in Song)
- Bicentennial Celebration: American Country Favorites (1975)
- Bicentennial Celebration: American Holidays, The Blues of America (1975)
- Bicentennial Celebration: American Marches, American Theatre (1975)
- Bicentennial Celebration: American Waltzes, Gay Nineties Waltzes (1975)
- Big Hits from Silver Screen (1975)
- Hit Songs from Spain (1975)
- Movie Themes - Arrangements by Les Baxter (1975)
- Rhapsody in Blue (1975) (credited to 101 Violins)
- T.V. Themes (1975)
- The Wonderful World of Screen Music Vol. 1 (1975) (front cover reads Screen Music with 101 Strings Vol. 1)
- The Wonderful World of Screen Music Vol. 2 (1975) (front cover reads Screen Music with 101 Strings Vol. 2)
- 20's Style (1976)
- All You Need Is Love (1976)
- Je T'aime (1976)
- Love Theme (1976)
- The Sound of Silence (1976)
- 101 Strings Orchestra Plus The Alshire Singers Play & Sing the Songs of The Beach Boys (1976)
- 101 Strings Orchestra and Chorus Play and Sing Hits of Today and Other Hit Instrumentals (1976)
- 101 Strings Orchestra Featuring The Alshire Singers Play & Sing the Songs of The Carpenters (1976)
- 101 Strings Orchestra Play & Sing the Songs Made Famous by... Elton John (1976)
- 101 Strings Orchestra Play & Sing the Songs Made Famous by... John Denver (1976)
- 101 Strings Orchestra Play & Sing the Songs Made Famous by... Olivia Newton John (1976)
- 101 Strings Orchestra Play Big Hits of Today (1976)
- 101 Strings Orchestra Play Burt Bacharach and Other Original Songs (1976)
- 101 Strings Orchestra Play Jim Webb and Other Original Songs (1976)
- Melodies of Love (1976)
- Moon River (1976)
- 101 Strings in the 50's Style Volume 2 (1977) (disc label reads Hits of the 50's - Vol II)
- 101 Strings in the 60's Style Volume 2 (1977)
- 101 Strings Play More Hits of Today and Other Original Hits (1977)
- 70's Style (1977) (back cover reads 101 Strings Orchestra Play in the 70's Style)
- Charles Baudelaire (1977)
- More Movie Themes and Other Original Themes (1977)
- The Romantic Years (1977)
- 101 Strings Play a Tribute to Bing Crosby (1978)
- Award Winning Scores from the Silver Screen (1978) (different track list from 1958 album)
- Music from the Movies (1978)
- 101 Strings and The Alshire Singers Do the Dolly Parton Songbook (1979)
- 101 Strings Goes Disco (1979)
- All about Love (1979)
- It's Love... That's All (1979)
- Piano Mixtures (1979)
- Violinos e Muito Amor (1979)
- Themes from Superman and Other Great Themes from Space (1979)
- A Tribute to John Lennon (1979)
- A Tribute to John Wayne (1980)
- The Many Moods of 101 Strings (this Bonus LP was "not for sale"; back cover reads "Library Selector - A program assembled to help you select a collection of magnificent '101 Strings' albums"; title also used for 3-LP compilation box set)
- Ravel: Bolero

== Films ==
The music of the 101 Strings Orchestra was prominently featured throughout the film Easy Listening (2002).
