= Peter Davenport (disambiguation) =

Peter Davenport may refer to:

- Peter Davenport (born 1961), footballer and sports manager
- Peter Davenport, musician and founder of British rock and roll band The Stargazers (1980s group)
- Peter Davenport, ufologist and director (since 1994) of the National UFO Reporting Center
