= Damont Records =

Defunct English budget record label

- Founded: July, 1972
- Status: Defunct
- Genre: Various

Damont Records was the parent company of budget record label Stereo Gold Award that was owned by Leo Muller aka Dave Miller.

== Background ==
In the U.K., Damont was located at Blyth Road, Hayes, Middlesex. In addition to Stereo Gold Award, it also owned children's record label Happy House. It was launched in July 1972 by Dave Miller and his U.K. partner Monty Presky. Presky was formerly a director with PYE. Together they took control of the Stereo Gold Award label which was selling its product at 63p. They then relaunched it again, selling the product at 49p. They had three new releases that month which included Soul Hits, Hammond Dancer Party, and a cover version album of singles hits called 12 Tops.

=== Happy House ===
This was a label headed by Miller and Presky that concentrated on releases for children. By June 1973, they had had an available catalogue of six albums with another six scheduled for release in autumn.

=== Stereo Gold Award ===
By July 1974, they had reached the five million mark with the Stereo Gold Award albums that they had produced and which were sold by Woolworths. To mark the occasion, and in recognition of this achievement, Monty Presky presented Woolworths buyer Bob Egerton with a gold disk.
