= Stereo Gold Award =

Defunct British budget record label

- Parent company: Damont Records
- Founded: 1972
- Status: Defunct
- Genre: Various
- Country of origin: U.K.

Stereo Gold Award was a budget label record label owned by producer Dave Miller. It released many budget and exploito type recordings during the 1970s. It was one of the last of Muller's major business ventures.

== Background ==
The label was a U.K. based label, and owned by Miller who also owned Distribution Direct. The parent company was Damont Records. The records were distributed in the U.K. by Record Merchandisers. It was announced in the August 8, 1970 edition of Billboard that the label was to be launched in mid September of that year by the U.K. Rack Consortium. The records were to be priced at $1.50 each and were to be manufactured by PYE which was a partner in the consortium. Most of the material would be sourced from the U.S. based Damill catalogue. In the U.K, Damill recordings were currently being released by PYE's subsidiary Marble Arch.

=== Relationship with Woolworths ===
By July 1974, five million Damont produced Stereo Gold Award albums had been sold via Woolworths since they had started selling them. In recognition of the level reached, Damont MD Monty Presky presented Woolworths buyer Bob Egerton with a gold disk. In 1979, retail chain F.W. Woolworth replaced Stereo Gold Award records that it was selling exclusively with their own brand / record label, Chevron. They had already been selling Chevron cassettes since 1977, so the arrival of the records would complement the cassettes. In a Billboard article dated February 17, 1979, Damont's MD Monty Presky was quoted as saying Woolworths would concentrate on a higher priced repertoire in the future and building its custom pressing business. He also said that it was a disappointment for them.
