= Joey Welz =

American rock pianist (born 1940)

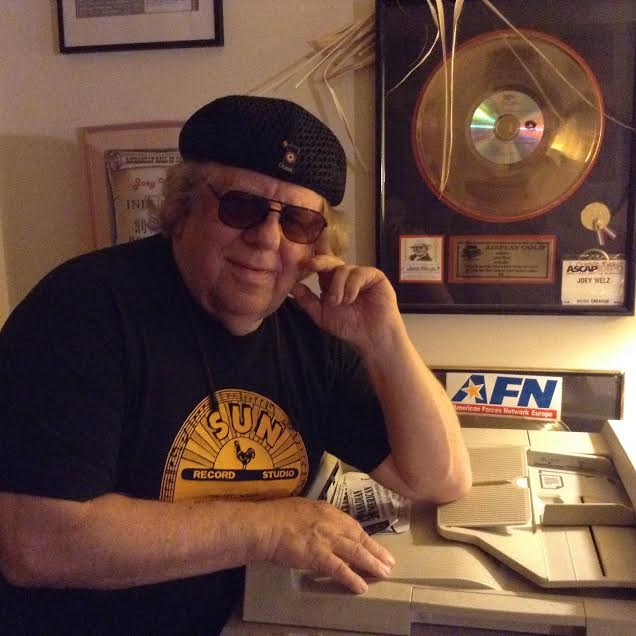

Background information
- Born: Joseph W. Welzant; March 17, 1940 (age 86); Baltimore, Maryland U.S.
- Origin: Baltimore, Maryland U.S.
- Genres: Rockabilly
- Occupation: Musician
- Instrument: Piano
- Years active: 1950s–present
- Formerly of: Bill Haley & His Comets
- Website: JoeyWelz.com

Joseph W. Welz (born Welzant, March 17, 1940) is an American musician best known for his tenure as pianist with Bill Haley & His Comets.

== Early life and education ==
Welz was born in Baltimore to Melba Welzant, a teacher and concert pianist, and Joseph Welzant, a Baltimore city police officer.

== Career ==
Welz started his music career with his group the Jay Rockers in the 1950s. Welz was amongst the first group of rock and roll pianists to start using the boogie-woogie style with his left hand. He attributes this to the lack of a bassist in his band, forcing him to play basslines using his left hand. In interviews he has stated that it also came in handy when he joined the Comets because the notes coming from the upright bass were often inaudible due to the limits of amplification at that time.

He attracted the attention of Bill Haley when The Jay Rockers opened for the Comets. While serving as a recording engineer for the Armed Forces Network in Berlin, Welz recorded and co-produced a live session for Bill Haley & His Comets for AFN Frankfurt. This was the first occasion that Welz played on a Bill Haley & His Comets record, providing backing vocals on "Shake, Rattle and Roll" and playing on "Honky Tonk". This session was released years later on Hydra Records. Upon exiting the military in 1963, Welz joined the Comets as pianist following the departure of Johnny Grande. It was also during this time that Welz signed a record deal with Canadian-American Records and released the single "Hey Little Moonbeam" which he co-wrote with Steve Lawrence. He would continue to play with The Comets until 1966.

In 1969, Welz recorded an album entitled "Listen To The Voices" with Link Wray which was released on Music City Records. Welz also recorded an album called "Revival Fires" with Roy Buchanan in the late 1960s. After Haley's death in 1981 Welz organized a Comets reunion which was performed on The Tomorrow Show with Tom Snyder on NBC. This was followed by a tour of America and a single penned by Welz, Al Rappa and Franny Beecher entitled "Bring Back the Music" in 1982.

Welz spent a majority of the 1980s in the studio with the Great Train Robbery, recording heavier rock and roll, including "In My Car", "Rockin' In America", and a heavy metal version of "Rock Around The Clock" which Welz co-wrote with the original writer James E. Myers.

He is the owner and CEO of Canadian-American Records and Caprice International Records. In the 1990s Welz began writing and recording country music in Nashville with the Nashville Now Band and placed several singles on the Cashbox chart including a country version of "Rock Around the Clock", "One Way Ticket", "Rockabilly", "Back to a Better Time" and the "Nashville Now Boogie".

In 1992, Welz signed with Caprice International/BMG.

Since the early 2000s Welz has annually toured in France with the Captain Joe Combo.

Welz continues to write and produce new albums up to the present day.

== Personal life ==
Welz currently resides in Lititz, Pennsylvania, where he has converted his home into a museum known as The Rock Around The Clock Hall of Fame. Welz was arrested on March 26, 2025 for shoplifting at Bomberger's Store in Warwick Township Pennsylvania.

== Honors ==
- 1992: Rockabilly Hall of Fame (the Netherlands)
- 2005: International Rockabilly Hall of Fame (Jackson, Tennessee)
- 2008: Memphis Heritage Music Hall of Fame (Memphis, Tennessee)

== Selected discography ==
=== Albums ===
- 1967: Vintage Ballads to Remember Her By (Palmer Records)
- 1972: The Ivory Decade of Joey Welz (Canadian American)
- 1974: Listen to the Voices That Want to Be Free (Music City Records)
- 1989: My Kind of Country Is Rock 'N' Roll (Caprice International Records)
- 1990: Awake (Caprice International Records)
- 1991: Revival Fires — Joey Welz and Roy Buchanan (Palmer Records)
- 2013: Link Wray Featuring Joey Welz - Rumble & Roll (Music Avenue)
- 2016: 21st Century Song Man (Canadian American/ Sony Music)
- 2017: Rock Around the Clock — Joey Welz The Comet MC (Canadian American / Sony Records)
- 2018: Livin' in a Hip Hop World (Canadian American / Sony Music)

=== Singles ===
- 1959: "Boppin' the Stroll" (Bat Records)
- 1963: "The Whistling Piano Man / The Mystery of Love" (Bat Records)
- 1965: "I'm a Lonely Guy / Hey Rattlesnake" (Leedle)
- 1968: "Ponchinello (You Silly Little Clown) / A Soldier's Star" (Canadian-American Records)
- 1983: "In My Car" (Fraternity Records)
- 1986: "Rock Around the Clock" (Caprice International Records)
- 1986: "The Return of Haley's Comet" (Caprice International Records)
- 1987: "Rockin' in America / Dancin' in the U.S.A." (American Radio Records)
- 1987: "I Love the Radio" (American Radio Records)
- 1987: "In My Car" (Caprice International Records)
- 1992: "Spanish Rose From Mexico" (Caprice International Records)
