= Johnny Kay =

Lead guitarist for Bill Haley & His Comets from 1961 to 1967

- Birth name: John Kaciuban
- Born: June 23, 1940; Chester, Pennsylvania, United States
- Died: July 9, 2022 (aged 82); Wilmington, Delaware, United States
- Instrument: Guitar
- Formerly of: Bill Haley & His Comets (1960-1968)

Johnny Kay (born John Kaciuban Jr.; June 23, 1940 – July 9, 2022) was an American guitarist and guitar teacher, best known as one of the guitarists for the early rock 'n' roll group Bill Haley & His Comets from 1960 to 1968. The founder of K-Video Productions, he was also the creator of the first guitar instruction video, "The Roots of Rock n Roll Video Guitar Course."

== Formative years and family ==
Born as John Kaciuban in Chester, Pennsylvania on June 23, 1940, Kay was a son of the late John and Helen (Lukowicz) Kaciuban, Sr. A 1958 graduate of Chester High School, he then attended Temple University in Philadelphia for two years. On June 8, 1966, he wed Ann Marie McSherry, a daughter of John McSherry of Toronto, Canada, at the Chapel of the Little White Flowers in Las Vegas, Nevada. A second, formal wedding ceremony was held at St. Mary's Ukrainian Orthodox Church in Chester on November 6 of that same year.

== Career ==
Bill Haley first heard Kay and his band at a gig at an Italian social club in West Chester, Pennsylvania. After a brief audition in 1960, during which band members heard him play the guitar solo to the song "Rock Around the Clock," Kay was asked by Bill Haley to join his band, the Comets, when he was only nineteen years old. He was hired to replace Haley's previous guitarist, Franny Beecher, who had quit the band in order to launch his own record label with sax player, Rudy Pompilli. When Beecher later returned to the Comets, Haley kept Kay in the band.

In 1966, as Haley's brand of rock and roll declined in popularity, Kay left the band. He found work as a guitar teacher and also performed at local clubs as a guitar for hire, including at Hurley's in Aston Township, Pennsylvania, which frequently booked established country music artists. Kay subsequently performed with Little Jimmy Dickens and Crystal Gayle, who offered him a job with her band, which Kay declined due to her band's frequent travel. During the early 1970s, Kay returned to the Comets for a world tour, which promised a number of concerts in Japan. As part of this tour, Kay appeared with Haley and his band at The London Rock and Roll Show at Wembley Stadium in London, England on August 5, 1972. Reportedly trying to strengthen his "weak eye" at the time by covering his good eye, Kay was captured on a film of that concert in which he can be seen playing while wearing an eye patch. His appearance with the band was aborted, however, when Haley cancelled much of the tour's remaining schedule.

The founder and operator of K-Video Productions, he created and distributed "The Roots of Rock n Roll Video Guitar Course," the first guitar instruction video.

== Death and interment ==
Kay died at the age of eighty-two in Wilmington, Delaware on July 9, 2022.

== Releases ==
In 2009, the German Hydra Records label released the album Bill Haley & Friends, Vol.4 - Johnny Kay - Tale Of A Comet as 27139.

== Sources ==
- Jim Dawson, Rock Around the Clock: The Record That Started the Rock Revolution! (San Francisco: Backbeat Books, 2005).
- John W. Haley and John von Hoelle, Sound and Glory (Wilmington, Delaware: Dyne-American, 1990).
- John Swenson, Bill Haley (London: W.H. Allen, 1982).
