= Art Ryerson =

American jazz guitarist

- Born: May 22, 1913; Columbus, Ohio, U.S.
- Died: October 27, 2004; Brookfield, Connecticut
- Genres: Jazz
- Occupation: Musician
- Instrument: Guitar
- Years active: 1930s–1970s

Arthur Ryerson (May 22, 1913 – October 27, 2004) was a jazz guitarist who emerged in the 1930s, playing acoustic and electric guitar, as well as the banjo. He played with jazz orchestras and bands in the 1930s and the 1940s. In the early 1950s, he played on several early rock and roll recordings of Bill Haley. His daughter is flautist Ali Ryerson.

== Career ==
=== Early years ===
Gibson ad featuring Art Ryerson

Art Ryerson began playing the banjo in Columbus, Ohio before switching to guitar. In the early 1930s he joined the Rhythm Jesters at radio station WLW in Cincinnati. He moved to New York City and worked in jazz clubs, including Nick's Tavern in Greenwich Village. He played banjo, mandolin, ukulele, and seven-string guitar.

In 1939, he joined the Paul Whiteman Orchestra and wrote arrangements for Whiteman's small groups Swinging Strings, Bouncing Brass, and Sax Soctette. He often employed three or four guitarists at once for these groups. In 1941, he joined the Raymond Scott Orchestra and moved from acoustic guitar to electric. During World War II, he led a band for the U.S. Army which performed for troops in England, Belgium, and France.

=== Studio guitarist ===
After leaving the Army, he returned to New York City and spent most of his career as a studio musician. Much of the work was for radio and television, including the first version of The Tonight Show with Jerry Lester, and the programs of Jack Benny, Ed Sullivan, Steve Allen, and Johnny Carson. In the studio, he recorded with Tony Bennett, Frank Sinatra, Ella Fitzgerald, Louis Armstrong, Mildred Bailey, Ruby Braff, Erroll Garner, Lionel Hampton, Bobby Hackett, Ellis Larkins, Red Norvo, Anita O'Day, Hot Lips Page, Artie Shaw, Mel Tormé, Sarah Vaughan, Charlie Parker, Fats Waller, and Elvis Presley.

He played guitar on Tony Bennett's classic releases "Blue Velvet", "Rags to Riches", and "Sing You Sinners". "Rags to Riches" was number one for six weeks on the Billboard pop singles chart in 1953, from November 21 to December 26.

He played guitar on Eartha Kitt's first five albums as a member of the Henri René orchestra; RCA Victor Presents Eartha Kitt (1953), That Bad Eartha (EP) (1954), Down To Eartha (1955), That Bad Eartha (LP) (1956), and Thursday's Child (1957), all with RCA Victor.

=== Recording with Bill Haley ===
Ryerson played lead guitar on Bill Haley classics such as "Crazy Man, Crazy", "What'cha Gonna Do?", "Fractured", "Pat-a-Cake", "Live It Up (Bill Haley song)", "Farewell, So Long, Goodbye", "Ten Little Indians", "I'll Be True", "Straight Jacket", "Yes Indeed", and "Chattanooga Choo Choo", released on Essex Records. "Crazy Man, Crazy", recorded in April, 1953 in Philadelphia, Pennsylvania backed with "What'cha Gonna Do?", reaching No. 12 on the national Billboard Juke Box pop singles chart for the week ending June 20 and No. 11 on the Cash Box chart on June 13. "Fractured" and "Live It Up" also made the Billboard Top 40, reaching No. 24 and No. 25 respectively in 1953.

== Discography ==
=== As sideman ===
- 1950 Sarah Vaughan in Hi-Fi, Sarah Vaughan
- 1953 Big Band, Charlie Parker
- 1953 That Bad Eartha, Eartha Kitt
- 1955 Adoration of the Melody, Ruby Braff
- 1956 Manhattan at Midnight, Ellis Larkins
- 1959 Satchmo in Style, Louis Armstrong
- 1962 Spanish Guitar, Tony Mottola
- 1969 Moog: The Electric Eclectics of Dick Hyman, Dick Hyman
- 1971 That's My Kick, Erroll Garner
- 1973 What a Wonderful World, Bobby Hackett
- 1992 On the Trail Again, Frankie Laine
- 1993 The Columbia Years (1943–1952), Frank Sinatra

== Sources ==
- Swenson, John. Bill Haley: The Daddy of Rock and Roll. New York: Stein and Day, 1983.
- Bronson, Fred. The Billboard Book of Number 1 Hits. New York: Billboard Books, 2003.
- Billboard, June 27, 1953.
