= Down Drury Lane to Memory Lane =

Album by 101 Strings

Studio album by 101 Strings
- Released: 1960
- Genre: MOR
- Label: Pye Golden Guinea

101 Strings chronology
Grand Canyon Suite	Down Drury Lane to Memory Lane	Morning Noon and Night

Down Drury Lane to Memory Lane was the fourth hit album, and first UK number one, for German orchestra 101 Strings. The album was the twentieth record to make number one in the UK and the first double number one album. It spent five weeks at the top.

The album consists of orchestral cover versions of both older and contemporary hits.

== Track listing ==
Side one
No.	Title	Length
1.	"Drury Lane to Broadway"
2.	"Rose Marie"
3.	"One Alone"
4.	"Make Believe"
5.	"One Kiss"

Side two
No.	Title	Length
1.	"You Are My Heart’s Delight"
2.	"Don’t Say Goodbye"
3.	"A Girl Like Nina"
4.	"I Won't Dance"
5.	"Glamorous Night"

Side three
No.	Title	Length
1.	"Between the Acts"
2.	"Music in May"
3.	"Rose of England"
4.	"My Love is Like the River"
5.	"People Will Say We're in Love"

Side four
No.	Title	Length
1.	"Some Enchanted Evening"
2.	"Getting to Know You"
3.	"Fanny"
4.	"I Could Have Danced All Night"

== Chart positions ==
Chart	Year	Peak position
UK Albums Chart	1960	1

== Writing credits ==
The following personnel all have writing credits on this album.

- Rudolf Friml
- Sigmund Romberg
- Jerome Kern
- Franz Lehár
- Ivor Novello
- Robert Stolz
- Paul Abraham
- Oscar Hammerstein II
- Kenneth Leslie-Smith
- Rodgers and Hammerstein
- Harold Rome
- Frederick Loewe
- Alan Jay Lerner
