= Gina Haley =

American singer-songwriter (born 1975)

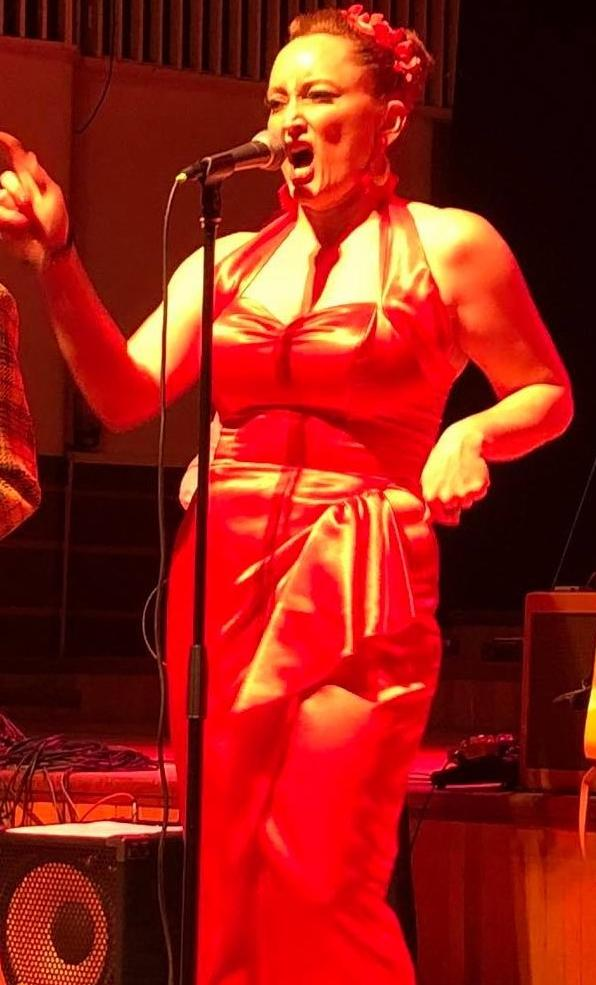
- Haley performing in 2020

Background information
- Also known as: Gina Haley
- Born: Linda Georgina Haley; April 23, 1975 (age 51); Mexico
- Genres: Alternative country, rockabilly
- Occupations: Singer-songwriter, performer
- Instruments: Guitar, piano
- Years active: 1990s–present

Linda Georgina (Gina) Haley (born April 23, 1975) is an American singer-songwriter.

Haley is the youngest child of rock and roll pioneer Bill Haley from his marriage to his last wife, Martha. She was born in Veracruz and grew up in Harlingen, Texas, and was only five years old when her father died in 1981. At 18 years old, she left home and set out to find her musical identity, which landed her in Houston.

Haley's earliest musical inspiration was her father, who encouraged her natural singing talent from the age of four by recording her on a tape recorder and playfully introducing her as a radio musical act. Following his death, she began extensively researching his professional life, which deeply influenced her artistic direction and broadened her understanding of the origins of American popular music. This exploration into the roots of early rock and roll ultimately led her to develop a deep affinity for early rhythm and blues.

In 1995 Haley moved to Los Angeles so she could pursue a professional career as a singer and songwriter.

She caught the eye of producer Michael Sembello, and worked with him writing, recording, and arranging tracks which appeared in television and movies. Haley also worked with songwriter Richard Rudolph, and published songs through Music Sales Group. Her first self-titled album, Heat Wave, was released in Japan in 1999.

During these years in Los Angeles, she sang with the world music group called The Bridge, whose members included Edu Falcao, Daniel Jobim, Paulinho Da Costa, Vincent Colaiuta, and Michael Sembello.

Haley later formed her own group, the Gina Haley Band, and continues to work in the musical field in her home state of Texas.

On July 6, 2005, she performed with her father's old band, The Comets at the Viper Room in West Hollywood as part of 50th-anniversary celebrations of her father's famous song "Rock Around the Clock" reaching the number-one position on American sales charts, as well as what would have been Bill Haley's 80th birthday.

In June 2008, the Gina Haley Band performed at the Bill Haley induction to the South Texas Music Walk of Fame in Corpus Christi, Texas. Other inductees included Chelo Silva, Pat Grogan, Joe Gallardo, Max Stalling, and The Reverend Horton Heat.

During a visit to Hamburg's Reeperbahn district in April of 2011, Haley visited the memorial plaque for the Star-Club, where her father performed in 1962. While traveling internationally to keep his musical legacy alive, she noted the difference in how his memory was preserved, stating, "In the US, my father is almost forgotten. And here, he is still a legend. That makes me so happy."
