= Bill Haley's New Comets =

- Origin: Philadelphia, Pennsylvania, United States
- Genres: Rock and roll; rockabilly
- Years active: 1987–present as The Comets, Bill Haley's Comets, etc.
- Labels: Sony, Warner Bros, CultSound
- Members: Joe Bill Clifton; Bill Turner (temp.); Pete Davenport; Noby Solback; Matt Whitley; John Duckstone; Mani Lytle; Hugh Bam Bam Cellarhope; Special Guest; Gina Haley

Bill Haley's New Comets is a rock and roll band founded in 1987 by singer Joe "Bill" Clifton. As only legal successors of the original performers this band keeps Bill Haley's music alive in its original 1950s style with original instrumentation, stage outfits and stage acrobatics.

In 2004, the group was awarded 'Artists of the Year' by the German Artists Magazine appreciating their artistic merits for classic rock and roll.

In 2007, original Comet, Pete Davenport, joined the band with his steel guitar. In 2011, original Haley guitarist Bill Turner, will join the band for their international tours.

In 2011, Bill Haley's daughter, Gina Haley, will start working with the New Comets on the remembrance of her father's work, touring with them for the first time internationally.

The band's most important event remains November 5, 1989, when the original 1954 Comets went back on stage in Bristol, England, inviting the New Comets to perform together. Impressed by the high musical standard and the authentic presentation of their 'fostersons' (Marshall Lytle: "I saw Bill and myself on stage 40 years ago!"), the American musicians officially gave symbolic validation to use their name and deemed them worthy successors of their work. This honor had never before been granted to any other succession-band by their originals.

== Discography ==
- 1991: Rock On Haley (CD Sony Records)
- 2000: Live On Stage (CD Warner Bros. Records)

== Filmography ==
- 2004: 50 Years Rock Around The Clock (DVD CultSound)
