= The Jodimars =

American rock and roll band

- Origin: Chester, Pennsylvania
- Genres: Rock and roll
- Years active: 1955–1958, 1987–1989
- Labels: Capitol, President, Milestone
- Past members: Marshall Lytle, Joey Ambrose, Dick Richards, Chuck Hess, Max Daffner, Jim Buffington, Bob Simpson.

The Jodimars was an American rock 'n' roll band that was formed in the summer of 1955 and remained active until 1958. The band was created by former members of Bill Haley & His Comets who had quit that group in a salary dispute. The name of the group was derived from the first letters of the first names of the founding members: Joey Ambrose (real name Joey d'Ambrosio) (saxophone), Dick Boccelli (under the name "Dick Richards") (vocals and drums), and Marshall Lytle (string bass). Other members included Chuck Hess (guitar), Jim Buffington (drums), Bob Simpson (Piano), and Max Daffner (drums).

== Career ==
During the summer of 1955, Lytle, Ambrose and Richards, who were paid on a set salary (as opposed to the other two Comets, pianist Johnny Grande and steel guitar player Billy Williamson, who were considered partners with Haley), requested a pay raise. According to the books Bill Haley by John Swenson and Sound and Glory by John W. Haley and John von Hoelle, their request was denied by either Haley's management or by Haley himself (accounts vary). During that summer, unknown to Haley, the trio recruited a couple of other musicians, and recorded a few demo tapes - including a version of a Haley composition, "Rock-a-Beatin' Boogie". This won the group a recording contract with Capitol Records and the group subsequently resigned from the Comets, although according to Swenson they agreed to help train the replacement musicians.

The group's first recordings on Capitol came out in late 1955, and the band scored a few minor hits such as "Well Now, Dig This" and "Let's All Rock Together". In 1956, the Jodimars became one of the first rock and roll acts to take up residence in Las Vegas showrooms. Soon after, they left Capitol and recorded for smaller labels with no success. By 1958, the band had virtually broken up, though Lytle attempted to revive the group with a series of demo recordings later that year, though he was the only member of the core band to actually take part in the recordings (members of Ricky Nelson's band worked on the recording session instead) and they sat unreleased until 1994.

By the 1960s, the Jodimars were only a memory, with Lytle going into real estate, Ambrose becoming a casino pit boss in Las Vegas, and Boccelli/Richards becoming a stage and movie actor. In 1987, the band reunited for a series of concerts in conjunction with a simultaneous reunion of the original members of Bill Haley's Comets. In 1989, Johnny Hale brought the original Comets to the UK as part of his Brean Sands Rock 'n' Roll Weekender. The Jodimars (Joey, Dick and Marshall) were backed by three members of the UK group The Stargazers (Pete Davenport on lead guitar, Chris Gardner on piano, and Ricky Lee Brawn on drums) in a set which included their album in its entirety (12 songs) plus a few other later Jodimars' numbers, and was followed by a set as 'The Original Comets'. This remains the only billed appearance by the Jodimars since the 1960s.

Lytle, Ambrose and Richards went on to tour the world as the Comets alongside pianist Johnny Grande and guitarist Franny Beecher, but included Jodimars songs in each show (most notably "Eat Your Heart Out, Annie" and "Well Now Dig This"). Lytle left the Comets in 2009, following the death of Grande in 2006 and Beecher's retirement from touring also in 2006 (Beecher died in February 2014), and continued to perform as a solo act until his death in May 2013, though he, Ambrose and Richards reunited in 2012 to accept the Comets' induction into the Rock and Roll Hall of Fame. Marshall Lytle died on May 25, 2013 at the age of 89, but Ambrose and Richards continued to tour as the Comets. Richards died on July 12, 2019, at the age of 95. Joey Ambrose subsequently retired from touring and died in 2021.

In 1963, the Beatles recorded a version of the Jodimars' "Clarabella" for the Pop Go the Beatles program for BBC Radio, which appeared on the Apple/Parlophone/Capitol album Live at the BBC in 1994, while the song "Well Now, Dig This" inspired the name of the British music magazine, Now Dig This.

== Discography ==
- "Well Now, Dig This" / "Let's All Rock Together", Capitol F3285, November 1955
- "Dance the Bop" (also issued as "Dancin' the Bop") / "Boom, Boom My Bayou Baby", F3360, February 1956
- "Lot'sa Love" / "Rattle My Bones", F3436, May 1956
- "Eat Your Heart Out, Annie" / "Rattle Shakin' Daddy", F3512, August 1956
- "Midnight" / "Clarabella", F3588, November 1956
- "Cloud 99" / "Later", F3633, January 1957
- "Shoo-Sue (Get Away From Me)" / "Story Telling Baby", President 1017, February 1958
- "One Grain of Sand" / "Time (Is Endless), Milestone 2004, November 1960 (credited to "Marshall and Wes and The Jodimars" [Wes being Wes Buchanan])

Additional recordings exist from a demo session in 1955 ("Flip, Flop and Fly", "Rock-A-Beatin' Boogie" (written by Bill Haley) and "The Big Beat"). All but the latter were released in 1994; "The Big Beat" remains unreleased. In 1958, Lytle recorded "Hip Shakin' Baby", "Be My Love Tonight", "Honey Baby", and "Bring Along Your Lovin'" with Ricky Nelson's band as The Jodimars (Ambrose and Richards reportedly being unavailable) but these recordings also were not released until 1994. A Jodimars cover version of "Dim, Dim the Lights" (which was also a hit for Haley and the Comets) is also known to exist but has never been released.

Two compilation albums of Jodimars recordings exist: Well Now Dig This, first released in 1970 then reissued in 1979, and finally in 1989 as a CD release by the Bulldog Records label (France), and Let's All Rock Together on the Rockstar Records label (UK) in 1994, which included the first release of the 1955 and 1958 demo recordings.

== See also ==
- Bill Haley & His Comets

== Sources ==
=== Books ===
- John W. Haley and John von Hoëlle, Sound and Glory (Wilmington, DE: Dyne-American, 1990)
- John Swenson, Bill Haley (London: W.H. Allen, 1982), ISBN 9780491029476
