= Joey Ambrose =

American saxophonist (1934–2021)

- Birth name: Joseph Frank D'Ambrosio
- Born: March 23, 1934; Philadelphia, Pennsylvania, U.S.
- Died: August 9, 2021 (aged 87); Henderson, Nevada, U.S.
- Genres: rock and roll
- Instrument: Saxophone
- Labels: Decca
- Formerly of: Bill Haley & His Comets

Joseph Frank D'Ambrosio (March 23, 1934 – August 9, 2021), also known by his stage name Joey Ambrose, was an American saxophonist who was best known for being a member of the rock and roll band Bill Haley & His Comets. He played tenor saxophone on two of their biggest hits, "Rock Around the Clock" and "Shake, Rattle and Roll". He was inducted into the Rock and Roll Hall of Fame in 2012.

== Life and career ==
D'Ambrosio was born in Philadelphia, Pennsylvania, in March 1934.

Ambrose was initially a member of Bill Haley & His Comets between 1954 and 1955, playing on some of their biggest releases, including "Rock Around the Clock" and "Shake, Rattle and Roll". From 1955 to 1959, he was a member of The Jodimars with former Comets members Dick Richards and Marshall Lytle. After their breakup, Ambrose worked at Caesars Palace in Las Vegas, where he would remain for 27 years.

In 1987, Ambrose re-grouped with former bandmates Johnny Grande, Franny Beecher, Dick Richards and Marshall Lytle to form Bill Haley's Original Comets.

In 2012, Ambrose along with most of the other 1950–1960 members of the Comets were inducted into the Rock and Roll Hall of Fame.

Ambrose died on August 9, 2021, at the age of 87. At the time of his death, he was considered to be the last surviving original member of the group.

== Sources ==
- Jim Dawson, Rock Around the Clock: The Record That Started the Rock Revolution! (San Francisco: Backbeat Books, 2005).
- John W. Haley and John von Hoelle, Sound and Glory (Wilmington, Delaware: Dyne-American, 1990).
- John Swenson, Bill Haley (London: W.H. Allen, 1982).
