= The Stargazers (band) =

British rock and roll band

The Stargazers are a British rock and roll band.

== History ==
The band was formed in 1981, some time after the earlier band of the same name had folded. Work on the new band by founder members Ricky Lee Brawn and Peter Davenport began in August 1980 and following a series of auditions Anders Janes, John Wallace and Danny Brittain were added to the line-up. After a succession of concerts and gigs during 1981, Muff Winwood secured The Stargazers a recording contract on the CBS Epic Records (now Sony) records. A total of four 7" records and one 12" album were released, with Groove Baby Groove (Davenport) reaching a chart high of 56, and a cover version of the old Louis Prima song "Hey Marie" just breaking into the top 100. The group became known in the UK for their performances of 1950s style rock and roll. Offering a mixture of original songs, arranged standards and cover versions of 1950s hits, particularly those of Bill Haley & His Comets, after whom the group loosely patterned its appearance and performance style. The 1970s rock and roll scene was dominated by a crowd typically attired in Teddy Boy style, who were in general devotees of the aggressive, hard edged electric rockabilly of Crazy Cavan. The Stargazers aimed for what they regarded as a more accurate and authentic mid 1950s sound and look.

The original line-up ended in 1983. Several attempts at reformation were made during the mid eighties. In 1988–1994, the line-up comprised Davenport on guitar, Brawn on drums, Chris Gardner on piano, Brittain on lead vocals, Wallace on sax and Tim "Trundle" Purkess (previously with the Kentish band Red Hot) on bass. They often headlined major rock'n'roll shows. Further releases on the Ace, Vinyl Japan and Blue Light labels were also well received.

Stargazers' guitarist Davenport toured Great Britain in the early 1990s as a guest member of the Original Comets (he played steel guitar on the live album We're Gonna Party on Hydra Records). Around this time, Comets bass player Marshall Lytle (who had earlier guested on the Stargazers album The Speaking Clock says Rock!) along with partner and drummer Brawn recorded a solo album for the Vinyl Japan label backed by fellow Stargazers member Wallace entitled Air Mail Special (the group took the name "Marshall and the Shooting Stars" for the album). Also during the early '90s, Purkess, Brittain, Wallace and Davenport formed a Stargazers spin-off quartet called The Four Chaps. This act had a humorous, tongue-in-cheek aspect to it and the band would send up old (mostly between the wars) jazz numbers whilst poking fun at themselves, and their audiences. Brawn went on to produce the reunited Comets' 1997 album The House is Rockin for Rockstar Records. Several tracks on this release also features guest appearances from Purkess, as well as Brawn's wife, singer Helen Shadow. Brawn can also be heard playing drums on certain songs.

Other musicians who have at times worked with the band include Alex Bland (sax), Aaron Liddard (sax), Simon Gilby (sax), Big Al Mumbray (sax), Clive Osborne (sax), Jim Russell (drums), Terry Doe (drums), Shaun O'Keefe (drums), John Dillon (drums), Gary Richardson (drums), Bobby Trimble (drums), Marc Breman (guitar), Jim Knowler (guitar), James Compton (piano) and Henri Herbert (piano).

== Recent times ==
Brawn left the band in 1993 and formed a series of groups including The Big 6 (which again was to feature Janes, and later Purkess, on bass) his "Astrobilly" band, the Space Cadets, and more recently The Shooting Stars. Original bassist Janes went on to join singer/saxophonist Ray Gelato in the Chevalier Brothers and then The Ray Gelato Giants, both swing bands, using the stage name of 'Clark Kent'. He was also involved with the aforementioned Space Cadets. Finally leaving Ray Gelato in 2004, he now manages and plays in the Jazz Dynamos. Wallace resigned in October 2007, to concentrate on his other projects (The Hep Chaps and Heavyshift) and freelance session work.

An offshoot of The Stargazers performing under the name of "The Rock'n'Roll Society" and featuring Brittain, Purkess, Davenport, Jimmy "DaHoof" Russell, Liddard and Herbert was planned for launch in 2008.

In addition to The Stargazers and The Rock'n'Roll Society, Davenport works with the Bill Haley Orchestra in Rock Around The Clock — The Bill Haley Story, a tribute revue based in Germany. Brittain runs his own music agency (DBBM) and gigs with his London band, The Wild Uncles. Purkess has a joinery firm (producing exhibition plinths and counters) and still does some session work for other outfits.

In September 2011, a collectors edition CD of all the material recorded for Epic Records during the 1981-83 period, was released on Rhythm Rock-It Records, entitled Epic Rock'n'Roll.

After a few line up changes (which included having Henri Herbert on piano for many gigs - playing mostly with the band's alter ego's 'The Rock 'n' Roll Society') the band settled down to a steady gigging six piece who were ready to start recording again in around 2013. This line up consisted of Danny Brittain - original vocalist, Pete Davenport - original guitarist, Tim "Trundle" Purkess - long standing upright bass man, Jim Russell - drums since 2005, Aaron Liddard - saxophonist of almost 10 years standing and Jamie Rowan - the pianist since 2012. The first recorded offering was a 7" vinyl single, "Boo Hoo Hoo" c/w "Half a Heart" (both original numbers penned by Davenport and Brittain respectively). It was produced on the band's own label Ruby-Tone Records (named after Purkess' Dutch barge 'Ruby' - as it was Purkess who initiated the recordings and founded the label). Next up on Ruby-Tone was another single - "Play My Game" - a collaborative composition based on an Aaron Liddard top line - c/w "Free Tonight" - a strolling ballad from their pianist Rowan.
