= Billy Gussak =

American drummer

William Gussak (1920–1994) was an American jazz and recording session drummer, best known for being the drummer on the classic 12 April 1954 recording of "Rock Around the Clock" by Bill Haley and His Comets. Some sources incorrectly spell his name as Guesak.

== Career ==
Gussak was a well-respected session drummer, who had been used by Haley on some of his 1953 recordings, including "Real Rock Drive" and "Crazy Man, Crazy" in preference to the Comets' usual live drummer Dick Boccelli (also known as Dick Richards). According to one source , it was record producer Milt Gabler who insisted on using Gussak. "Gabler, who wanted to stress the big beat sound that he could get from [recording studio] Pythian Temple's acoustics, brought in his own session drummer ... Beginning with his three rim shots at the start of the record, Gussak would drop echoed snare bombs throughout, giving a dynamic to "Rock Around The Clock" that Haley's material had never had before."

Gussak continued as a studio drummer after "Rock Around The Clock" became successful, recording occasionally with Haley through 1954/55 and then recording with The Jodimars, the members of the Comets who had split away from Haley. Gussak later moved to California, where he recorded with Perry Como among others, before retiring due to arthritis. In the early 1960s he collaborated on some songs with eccentric musician Stephen "Brute Force" Friedland, at the time the boyfriend of his daughter.

Gussak is also credited with a number of patents in relation to drum design. He died in 1994.

== Sources ==
- Jim Dawson, Rock Around the Clock: The Record That Started the Rock Revolution! (San Francisco: Backbeat Books, 2005)
- John W. Haley and John von Hoelle, Sound and Glory (Wilmington, Delaware: Dyne-American, 1990)
- John Swenson, Bill Haley (London: W.H. Allen, 1982)
- Discography information from Bill Haley Central and Bill Haley & His Comets, etc.: A Discography, an unpublished reference work by Herbert Kamitz
- What Was the First Rock 'n' Roll Record? ISBN 0-571-12939-0 (paper)
- Charlie Gillette and SImon Frith, eds., Rock File 4 (Panther Books, 1976) ISBN 0-586-04370-5
