= Marshall Lytle =

American double-bassist

- Marshall Lytle in 1997

Background information
- Born: Marshall Edward Lytle; September 1, 1933; Old Fort, North Carolina, U.S.
- Died: May 25, 2013 (aged 79) New Port Richey, Florida, U.S.
- Genres: Rock and roll, country, rockabilly
- Occupations: Bassist, songwriter, musician
- Instrument: Double bass
- Years active: 1951–2013
- Labels: Essex Records, Decca Records, Capitol Records, Rollin' Rock Records, Rockstar Records, Hydra Records, Dnd Records, Bucket List Studios Of Tampa Bay

Marshall Edward Lytle (September 1, 1933 – May 25, 2013) was an American rock and roll bassist, best known for his work with the groups Bill Haley & His Comets and The Jodimars in the 1950s. He played upright slap bass on the iconic 1950s rock and roll records "Crazy Man, Crazy", "Shake, Rattle and Roll", and "Rock Around the Clock".

== Career ==
Born in Old Fort, North Carolina, Lytle was a guitar player before joining Bill Haley's country music group, The Saddlemen, in 1951. But Lytle was hired to play double bass for the group, replacing departing musician Al Rex, so Haley taught Lytle the basics of slap bass playing. Lytle, who was only a teenager at the time, grew a moustache in order to look a little older, and became a full-time member of The Saddlemen and, in September 1952, he was with the group when they changed their name to Bill Haley & His Comets. Soon after, Lytle co-wrote with Haley the band's first national hit, "Crazy Man, Crazy" although he did not receive co-authorship credit for it (until 2002).

Lytle played on all of Haley's recordings between mid-1951 and the summer of 1955, including the epochal "Rock Around the Clock" in 1954 (fellow Jodimars saxophonist Joey Ambrose and drummer Dick Richards also appeared on the original of the classic track). He was paid $41.25 for the three-hour Decca recording session which also included the original A side, "Thirteen Women (And Only One Man in Town)". He played a late 1940s model Epiphone B5 upright double bass, purchased in October 1951, for about $275. He used gut strings for the G and D strings while the A and E strings were wound. Lytle's style of playing, which involved slapping the strings to make a percussive sound, is considered one of the signature sounds of early rock and roll and rockabilly. The athletic Lytle also developed a stage routine, along with Ambrose, that involved doing acrobatic stunts with the bass fiddle, including throwing it in the air and riding it like a horse. This became a signature performance for The Comets that later musicians working for Haley were instructed to emulate.

He was part of the band when they appeared on the NBC Texaco Star Theatre show hosted by Milton Berle and the Ed Sullivan Show on CBS in 1955. He also appeared in the 1954 Universal International Pictures movie short Round Up of Rhythm.

In September 1955, Lytle, along with drummer Dick Richards and Ambrose, quit The Comets in a salary dispute and formed their own musical group, The Jodimars. Before leaving, Lytle and his colleagues offered to train their replacements in the art of rock and roll playing, Comets style. Lytle was succeeded by Al Rex—ironically, the same musician he had originally been hired to replace.

The Jodimars became one of the first rock and roll groups to take up residence in Las Vegas showrooms, but only managed to score minor hits for Capitol Records and, later, smaller labels. By 1958 they had broken up, though Lytle attempted to continue the group on his own. Lytle continued to work in music off-and-on into the 1960s, but also got involved in other interests, changing his name to Tommy Page and getting into real estate and later opening an interior design business.

== Reunion ==
In October 1987, six years after the death of Bill Haley, Lytle was invited to take part in a reunion of the original 1954–55 Comets that was held in Philadelphia as part of a tribute concert in honor of Dick Clark. Despite the musicians not having seen each other in decades, The Comets quickly found that they possessed a musical affinity. Lytle sang the lyrics of "Rock Around the Clock" out-of-order at the first performance though.

Their performance was the hit of the show, and over the next couple of years The Comets began touring again, primarily in Europe. The band had recorded several albums for the German label Hydra Records, the UK-based Rockstar Records, and the US label Rollin' Rock Records. Lytle also recorded a solo album in 1993 entitled Air Mail Special backed by members of The Stargazers, a UK rockabilly group; the album was credited to "Marshall and the Shooting Stars".

Lytle continued to write music, and in the late 1990s he and his friend Warren Farren wrote a topical song called "Viagra Rock" that The Comets recorded; the song was popular on radio stations in Florida.

On July 5, 2005, The Comets played a high-profile concert for NASA employees at the Jet Propulsion Laboratory in Pasadena, California to celebrate the success of the Deep Impact space mission. The next day, the band played to a standing-room-only audience at the Viper Room in West Hollywood; the show ended with Lytle duetting with Bill Haley's youngest daughter, Gina Haley on "Rock the Joint" and a reprise of "Rock Around the Clock".

In 2006 the Original Comets took up a long-term residence at the Dick Clark American Bandstand Theater in Branson, Missouri, performing more than 150 shows at the venue, with more in 2007. The group also toured Europe in early 2007. Following the death of Johnny Grande and the retirement from touring of Franny Beecher, both in 2006, Lytle was one of three remaining original band members still with the group.

== Retirement ==
In December 2009, Lytle retired from performing and touring with the Comets. He stated that 20 years was a long enough reunion for him and that he wished to attempt other ventures, including concentrating on a solo project.

In 2009 Lytle also released his memoir, entitled Still Rockin' Around The Clock. At that time, he underwent surgery to remove part of his leg. Despite that setback, Lytle continued to perform, albeit with other musicians and without the other Comets.

In 2012, Lytle was inducted as a member of the Comets into the Rock and Roll Hall of Fame. Bill Haley had previously been inducted in 1987, but at the time the Hall did not include backing groups in its inductions; this was rectified in later years, resulting in the Comets and several other backing groups being inducted on their own in 2012.

On May 25, 2013, Lytle died of lung cancer at his home in New Port Richey, Florida, at the age of 79.

== Compositions ==
Lytle co-wrote the 1953 rock and roll classic "Crazy Man, Crazy" with Bill Haley although he was uncredited. He also co-wrote the follow-up Top 40 hit song "Fractured", which peaked at no. 24 in August 1953 on Billboard. He co-wrote The Jodimars' songs "Rattle Shakin' Daddy", "Eat Your Heart Out Annie" and "Let's All Rock Together" with Frank Pingatore, and "Viagra Rock" with Warren Farren. He also wrote the song "I'm Lonesome" for Lou Graham which was released as a Gotham single in 1952. He also wrote "Please Make Up Your Fickle Mind" and "My Heart Tells Me" for Graham.

Top 40 hit "Fractured" by Bill Haley With Haley's Comets released as an Essex Records 78, 327-B, in 1953.

== Sources ==
- Marshall Lytle, Still Rockin' Around The Clock: My Life in Rock n' Roll's First Super Group, Bill Haley and The Comets (CreateSpace, 2009)
- Jim Dawson, Rock Around the Clock: The Record That Started the Rock Revolution! (San Francisco: Backbeat Books, 2005)
- John W. Haley and John von Hoelle, Sound and Glory (Wilmington, DE: Dyne-American, 1990)
- John Swenson, Bill Haley (London: W.H. Allen, 1982)
- Otto Fuchs, Bill Haley: The Father of Rock 'n' Roll (Gelnhausen, Germany: Wagner, 2011)
