= Essex Records =

American record label

- Founded: 1951
- Founder: David Miller
- Status: Defunct
- Genre: Jazz, gospel, country, R&B, rock
- Country of origin: U.S.
- Location: Philadelphia, Pennsylvania

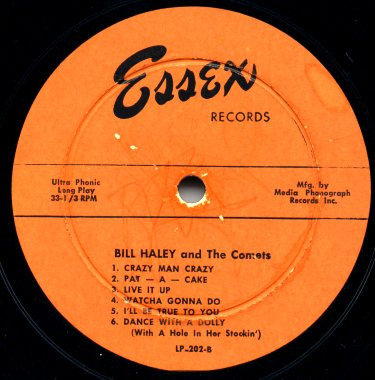
Bill Haley & His Comets

Essex Records was founded in Philadelphia, Pennsylvania, in 1951 by David Miller primarily to record contemporary country and western, rhythm and blues as well as jazz and gospel. Jack Howard was the promotion manager. The label had little popular success, but is known for releasing early Bill Haley & His Comets recordings such as "Rock the Joint" (1952) and "Crazy Man Crazy", the latter of which was the first rock and roll recording to make the American record charts when it was released in 1953. The label also scored success in 1954 with Eddie Calvert's recording of "O mein Papa".

The label also released the first 12-inch album of rock and roll music with its 1954 Haley compilation Rock with Bill Haley and the Comets. Haley's first big hit, "Crazy Man, Crazy" was followed by two other chart hits, "Fractured", and "Live It Up". In 1954, Haley left Essex for Decca Records. The primary female vocalist on the label was Bunny Paul, who scored hits in 1954 with "Such a Night" and "Honey Love". The colour of the Essex label was primarily orange with the print in black, but several singles were released on a blue label.

== See also ==
- List of record labels
