= Dave Miller (producer) =

American record producer and executive (1925–1985)

- Also known as: Leo Muller
- Born: David Leonard Miller; July 4, 1925; Philadelphia, Pennsylvania, U.S.
- Died: May 24, 1985 (aged 59) London, England
- Occupations: Record producer, record label owner
- Label: Stereo Gold Award

David Leonard Miller (July 4, 1925 – May 24, 1985) was an American record producer and the founder of many budget album record companies.

== Life and career ==
Miller was born in Philadelphia, Pennsylvania, to Albert and Olive Miller. Following World War II service in the United States Navy along with his brother-in-law Ralph Joseph, they started recording weddings direct to disc. After briefly working at the RCA Victor record pressing plant in Camden, New Jersey, where he learned more about recording and manufacturing records, he and his brother Paul formed their first record company with their own savings and those of their father Albert, naming their company Palda Records (a portmanteau of Paul, Albert, and David) in Philadelphia, eventually buying out their father's share.

=== Essex Records ===
Miller became the founder of Essex Records in Philadelphia, in 1951. The label had local popular success, being known mostly for its release of the early records by Bill Haley & His Comets. Miller originally changed the name of the group from the "Four Aces of Western Swing" to "Bill Haley and the Saddlemen" then repeated a suggestion that the group change their name to the Comets after Halley's Comet.

After Haley and the Comets signed to Decca Records, Haley sued Miller for selling the group's earlier records on his Essex label without paying royalties. As a result, Miller went bankrupt.

=== Somerset Records ===
Under his Miller International Company formed in 1957, with his Essex Records office manager George Phillips, he founded Somerset Records and Somerset Stereo Fidelity Records budget albums. His greatest claim to fame was selling large amounts of cheaply priced albums, with Somerset claiming to have manufactured the first stereo budget albums.

The name of Somerset high fidelity albums was suggested by Miller International's West Coast distributor, Jimmy Warren, with the name of Stereo Fidelity (stereo albums) thought of by Wally Hill to capitalize on the public's interest in both high fidelity and stereophonic sound.

The economy came from Miller starting his own record factory in Swarthmore, Pennsylvania, using public domain music and non union musicians from outside the United States to record cover versions of hit songs of the time. Many original tunes were written by Monty Kelly, Robert Lowden, and Joseph Kuhn with the music published by Miller's own music publisher, Chesdel Music created in 1962.

Miller had his own distribution channels of his records in supermarkets and drugstores with the cheap albums being sold in metal racks similar to those holding paperback books or cardboard record holders called "dumps" that could be placed anywhere. Miller's record albums were sold wholesale for 93 cents to salesmen who sold them to merchants who sold them to the public for $1.98. Somerset Records used artist Anthony "Chic" Laganella to create attractive eye catching album covers.

Miller used the name 101 Strings for several German orchestras, their first album appearing in September 1957. In 1958 Somerset released 24 101 Strings titles.

Miller International's philosophy after their experience with Essex Records was that recording "hits" was too unstable, and recording for teenagers and "sophisticates" was unprofitable as the two types bought "fads". Miller said that he did not want to record anything that would not sell ten years in the future.

In 1959 Miller signed the London Philharmonic Orchestra to his label and had his Somerset albums distributed in the United Kingdom by Pye Records. Disques Vogue of France followed soon afterwards.

Miller sold Somerset to Al Sherman in 1963 but remained credited as a producer on the albums when Sherman changed the name to Alshire Records, although the name Somerset was still used for some albums.

Miller formed Europa Records in Germany to duplicate the American sales success of Somerset in Europe. Many of the Somerset/Alshire recordings were issued in Europe on the Europa label. He continued to occasionally produce material and in the mid 1970s formed a brief partnership with Marty Wilson to release three albums of heavily orchestrated material for the New York disco scene, also releasing the recordings in European markets.

=== Stereo Gold Award ===
Budget label Stereo Gold Award was one of the last of Miller's major business ventures. It was a U.K. based label. The records were distributed in the U.K. by Record Merchandisers. On this label he often used the pseudonym Leo Muller. Some of the albums he produced and was credited composer for include Tamla Hits by Dianne And The New Worlds and Tribute To Jimi Hendrix by The Purple Fox.

== Death ==
Miller died in London, England, in 1985 at the age of 59.

== See also ==
- List of record labels
