= Bill Haley & His Comets discography =

Bill Haley & His Comets recorded many singles and albums. The following list references only their original release and generally does not include compilation albums (with a few exceptions) or single reissues. This list does not include releases on which the Comets worked as session musicians, and primarily focuses on releases during Haley's lifetime.

== Studio albums ==
- 1956 – Rock 'n' Roll Stage Show (Decca 8345)
- 1957 – Rockin' the Oldies (Decca 8569)
- 1958 – Rockin' Around the World (Decca 8692)
- 1959 – Bill Haley's Chicks (Decca 8821)
- 1959 – Strictly Instrumental (Decca 8964)
- 1960 – Bill Haley and His Comets (Warner Bros. 1378)
- 1960 – Haley's Juke Box (Warner Bros. 1391)
- 1961 – Twist (Dimsa 8255); Latin America release only
- 1961 – Bikini Twist (Dimsa 8259); Latin America release only
- 1962 – Twist Vol. 2 (Dimsa 8275); Latin America release only
- 1962 – Twist en Mexico (Dimsa 8290); Latin America release only
- 1963 – Madison (Orfeon 12339); Latin America release only
- 1963 – Carnaval de Ritmos Modernos (Orfeon 12340); Latin America release only
- 1964 – Rock-a-Round the Clock King (Guest Star 1454)
- 1964 – Surf Surf Surf (Orfeon 12354); Latin America release only
- 1966 – Whisky a Go-Go (Orfeon 12478) – studio album with simulated "live" audience overdubbed; re-recordings and new tracks; Latin America release only
- 1966 – Bill Haley a Go-Go (Dimsa 8381) – re-recordings; Latin America release only
- 1968 – Biggest Hits (re-recordings plus new tracks) (Sonet 9945); issued in England as Rock Around the Clock (Hallmark SHM 668) and in North America as Rockin' (Pickwick SPC 3256)
- 1971 – Rock Around the Country (Sonet 623); issued in North America by GNP-Crescendo (LP 2097) and as Travelin' Band on Janus (JLS 3035)
- 1973 – Just Rock 'n' Roll Music (Sonet 645); issued in North America by GNP-Crescendo (LP 2077) as Rock 'n' Roll
- 1976 – R-O-C-K (re-recordings) (Sonet 710); issued in North America by Sun International Records (Sun 143) in 1979
- 1978 – Golden Country Origins (previously unissued pre-Comets recordings from c.1948–1951) (Grassroots Records); Australia release only
- 1979 – Everyone Can Rock and Roll (Sonet 808); European release only

== Live albums ==
- 1962 – Twistin' Knights at the Roundtable (Roulette SR-25174) – recorded in New York City, March 1962
- 1968 – On Stage Vol. 1: Rock Around the Clock (Sonet SLP-63) – recorded in Stockholm, Sweden, June 1968
- 1968 – On Stage Vol. 2: Rock the Joint (Sonet SLP-69) – recorded in Stockholm, Sweden, June 1968
  - The above two albums have been reissued in many forms, including by Janus Records in North America as the two-album set, Razzle-Dazzle (Janus JX2S-7003), and numerous releases on the Pickwick and Hallmark labels in North America and UK.
- 1970 – Bill Haley's Scrapbook (Kama Sutra/Buddah KSBS-2014) – recorded in New York City, December 1969
- 1974 – Live in London '74 (Antic 51501) - recorded March 1974

In addition, two previously unissued live recordings were included on the 1973 soundtrack album for the concert film Let the Good Times Roll (Bell 9002), recorded in Detroit, Michigan.

Above list does not include live recordings issued after Haley's death.

== Notable compilations ==
- 1954 – Rock with Bill Haley and the Comets (Essex ESLP 202) – compilation of singles recorded 1952–1953
- 1955 – Shake, Rattle and Roll (Decca DL5560) – singles recorded 1954–1955
- 1955 – Rock Around the Clock (Decca DL8225) – singles recorded 1954–1955; an extended version of the above album
- 1958 – Rockin' the Joint (compilation of singles recorded 1955–1958 with several unreleased tracks) (Decca DL8775)
- 1963 – Bill Haley & His Comets (compilation of tracks recorded 1956–1959 with several unreleased tracks) (Vocalion 3696)
- 1968 – Bill Haley's Greatest Hits! (Decca DL5027; later reissued on MCA Records MAP1015)
- 1972 – Golden Hits (Decca DXSE7-211; later reissued on MCA LPS1035)
- 1975 – Golden Favorites (compilation of Decca recordings with unreleased tracks from 1958–1959) (MCA Coral 7845P)
- 1985 – From the Original Master Tapes (first official CD issue of Decca recordings) (MCA Records MCAD-5539)
- 1994 – Rock The Joint! (The Original Essex Recordings 1951–1954) (includes tracks recorded in 1951-52 for Holiday Records) (School Kids' Records SKR-1529)

== Other ==
- 1976 – Rudy's Rock: The Sax That Changed the World (billed as Rudy Pompilli and the Comets; recorded without Haley) (Sonet 696); European release only

== Singles ==
=== As Bill Haley and the 4 Aces of Western Swing ===
1948

- "Too Many Parties and Too Many Pals"/"Four Leaf Clover Blues" (Cowboy CR1201) August 1948

1949

- "Tennessee Border"/"Candy Kisses" (Cowboy CR1202) March 1949

=== As Bill Haley & the Saddlemen (and variations of the name) ===
Note: Haley recorded several singles with other groups prior to the Saddlemen that are not listed here.

1950

- "Deal Me a Hand" / "Ten Gallon Stetson" (Keystone 5101)
- "Susan Van Dusan" / "I'm Not to Blame" (Keystone 5102)
- "Why Do I Cry Over You?" / "I'm Gonna Dry Ev'ry Tear with a Kiss" (Atlantic 727)
- "My Sweet Little Girl from Nevada" / "My Palomino and I" (Cowboy 1701) – released as Reno Browne and Her Buckaroos

1951

- "Rocket 88" / "Tearstains on My Heart" (Holiday 105)
- "Green Tree Boogie" / "Down Deep in My Heart" (Holiday 108)
- "I'm Crying" / "Pretty Baby" (Holiday 110) – both with Loretta Glendenning
- "A Year Ago This Christmas" / "I Don't Want to Be Alone for Christmas" (Holiday 111)

1952

- "Juke Box Cannon Ball" / "Sundown Boogie" (Holiday 113)
- "Icy Heart" / "Rock the Joint" (Essex 303)
- "Dance with a Dolly" (With a Hole in Her Stockin')" / "Rocking Chair on the Moon" (Essex 305)

=== As Bill Haley & His Comets (and name variations thereof) ===
Year	Titles (A-side, B-side) Both sides from same album except where indicated	Chart positions			
Year	Titles (A-side, B-side) Both sides from same album except where indicated	US	US R&B	AUS	UK
1952	"Stop Beatin' Round The Mulberry Bush" b/w "Real Rock Drive"	—	—	—	—
1953	"Crazy Man, Crazy" b/w "What'cha Gonna Do"	12	—	—	—
1953	"Pat-A-Cake" b/w "Fractured" [B-side charted]	24	—	—	—
1953	"Live It Up!" b/w "Farewell, So Long, Goodbye"	25	—	—	—
1953	"I'll Be True" b/w "Ten Little Indians"	—	—	—	—
1954	"Chattanooga Choo Choo" b/w "Straight Jacket"	—	—	—	—
1954	"Yes Indeed!" b/w "Real Rock Drive"	—	—	—	—
1954	"Rock Around the Clock" b/w "Thirteen Women"	1	3	1	1
1954	"Shake, Rattle and Roll" b/w "A.B.C. Boogie"	7	—	—	4
1954	"Dim, Dim the Lights (I Want Some Atmosphere)" b/w "Happy Baby"	11	10	—	—
1955	"Birth of the Boogie"/ "Mambo Rock"	26; 18	—	14	— 14
1955	"Razzle Dazzle" b/w "Two Hound Dogs"	15	—	18	13
1955	"Burn That Candle"/ "Rock-A-Beatin' Boogie"	9; 41	9 —	—	— 4
1956	"See You Later, Alligator" b/w "The Paper Boy (On Main Street, U.S.A.)"	6	7	37	7
1956	"R-O-C-K"/ "The Saints Rock 'N' Roll"	16; 18	15 —	36	— 5
1956	"Hot Dog Buddy Buddy"/ "Rockin' Through the Rye"	60; 78	—	25	— 3
1956	"Rip It Up"/ "Teenager's Mother"	30; 68	—	20	4 —
1956	"Rudy's Rock" b/w "Blue Comet Blues"	34	—	—	26
1956	"Don't Knock the Rock"/ "Choo Choo Ch'Boogie"	—	—	—	—
1957	"Don't Knock the Rock" b/w "Calling All Comets"	—	—	—	7
1957	"Forty Cups of Coffee"/ "Hook, Line and Sinker"	70	—	—	—
1957	"(You Hit the Wrong Note) Billy Goat" b/w "Rockin' Rollin' Rover"	60	—	30	—
1957	"The Dipsy Doodle" b/w "Miss You"	—	—	—	—
1957	"Rock the Joint" (re-recording of their 1952 track) b/w "How Many"	—	—	—	—
1957	"Rock The Joint" (UK-only reissue of original 1952 track) b/w "Yes Indeed!"	—	—	—	20
1958	"Skinny Minnie" b/w "Sway with Me"	22	—	—	—
1958	"Lean Jean" b/w "Don't Nobody Move"	67	—	86	—
1958	"Whoa Mabel!" b/w "Chiquita Linda"	—	—	86	—
1958	"Corrine, Corrina" b/w "B.B. Betty"	—	—	—	—
1959	"I Got A Woman" b/w "Charmaine"	—	—	—	—
1959	"A Fool Such As I" b/w "Where'd You Go Last Night"	—	—	—	—
1959	"Caldonia" b/w "Shaky"	—	—	—	—
1959	"Joey's Song" b/w "Ooh Looka There, Ain't She Pretty"	46	—	1	—
1959	"Skokiaan (South African Song)" b/w "Puerto Rican Peddler"	70	—	—	—
1960	"Tamiami" b/w "Candy Kisses"	—	—	—	—
1960	"Chick Safari" b/w "Hawk"	—	—	—	—
1960	"Music! Music! Music!" b/w "Strictly Instrumental"	—	—	—	—
1960	"So Right Tonight" b/w "Let the Good Times Roll, Creole"	—	—	—	—
1961	"Flip, Flop and Fly" b/w "Honky Tonk"	—	—	—	—
1961	"The Spanish Twist" b/w "My Kind of Woman"	—	—	—	—
1961	"Riviera" b/w "War Paint"	—	—	—	—
1963	"Dance Around the Clock" b/w "What Can I Say After I Say I'm Sorry?"	—	—	—	—
1963	"Tandy" b/w "You Call Everybody Darlin'"	—	—	—	—
1963	"Tenor Man" b/w "Up Goes My Love"	—	—	—	—
1964	"The Green Door" b/w "Yeah! She's Evil"	—	—	—	—
1964	"Lean Jean" b/w "Skinny Minnie"	—	—	—	—
1965	"Burn That Candle" b/w "Stop, Look and Listen"	—	—	—	—
1965	"Tongue Tied Tony" b/w "Haley A Go Go"	—	—	—	—
1968	"Rock Around the Clock" (re-release) b/w "Shake, Rattle and Roll"	—	—	4	20
1969	"That's How I Got To Memphis" b/w "Ain't Love Funny, Ha Ha Ha"	—	—	—	—
1971	"A Little Piece At A Time" b/w "Travelin' Band"	—	—	—	—
1974	"Rock Around the Clock" (re-release) b/w "Shake, Rattle and Roll"	39	—	—	12
1974	"See You Later, Alligator" (re-release) b/w "Rudy's Rock"	—	—	—	52
1978	"Yodel Your Blues Away" b/w "Within This Broken Heart of Mine"	—	—	—	—
1981	"Haley's Golden Medley" b/w "A.B.C. Boogie"	—	—	—	50

=== Billboard Year-End performances ===
Year	Song	Year-End Position
1954	"Shake, Rattle and Roll"	26
1955	"Rock Around the Clock"	2
1956	"See You Later, Alligator"	33

== Other ==
As The Down Homers:

- 1946
- Out Where The West Winds Blow/Who's Gonna Kiss You When I'm Gone (Vogue R736)
- 1947
- Baby I Found Out All About You/Boogie Woogie Yodel (Vogue R786)

As Johnny Clifton and His String Band:

- 1950
- Stand Up and Be Counted/Loveless Blues (Center C102)

As The Kingsmen:

- 1958
- Weekend/Better Believe It (East West EW 115)
- The Cat Walk/ Conga Rock (East West EW 120)

"—" denotes a release that did not chart.

== Unreleased recordings ==
As with Elvis Presley and other contemporaries of the 1950s, a large stock of previously unreleased recordings by Bill Haley exist and have been released periodically in the years following his death. Many of these are early country and western tracks recorded as demos or, for some reason, unreleased. However, occasionally tracks from the 1950s and 1960s have emerged, as have live recordings. Since the early 1990s several European labels have released a number of previously unreleased recordings, including Hydra Records, Rollercoaster Records, Rockstar Records, Buddah Records, and Bear Family Records.

Notable discoveries that have been commercially released have included:

- Several 1946 radio recordings Haley made with the Down Homers (Rock n' Roll Arrives box set, Bear Family Records, 2006);
- A large cache of country-western recordings made by Haley in the 1946–51 era, before the formation of the Comets (also released on Rock 'n' Roll Arrives);
- An April 1955 concert in Cleveland, Ohio including the earliest known live recordings of "Rock Around the Clock" (Rock 'n' Roll Show, Hydra Records, 1995);
- A concert recording (Paris) from the European tour of 1958 (Vive La Rock 'n' Roll, Big Beat Records, 2002);
- A 1957 radio recording from Haley's tour of Australia;
- Soundtrack recordings from the 1958 film Here I Am, Here I Stay and the 1954 short film Round Up of Rhythm (On Screen, Hydra Records, 1998);
- Previously unreleased live recordings from the 1969 Bill Haley's Scrapbook sessions at the Bitter End (CD release of Bill Haley's Scrapbook (Kama Sutra/Buddah, 1993) and The Warner Brothers Years and More box set (Bear Family, 1999);
- Two Christmas recordings and a version of "Flip Flop and Fly" from the 1968 United Artists sessions;
- In-studio discussion recordings and alternate takes from the 1979 Everyone Can Rock and Roll sessions (The Journey to Fame, Denton Media, 2004);
- Assorted demos and alternate takes from the Decca and Warner Bros. era from the period 1958–1961, as well as additional alternate takes and unreleased tracks from the various labels Haley recorded with in the mid-1960s (The Decca Years and More box set (Bear Family, 1991) and The Warner Brothers Years and More box set (Bear Family, 1999); and
- Two 1962 broadcasts for Armed Forces Radio (On the Air, Hydra Records, 2001).
- Several live recordings from the 1958 European Tour (book "Rock ´n´ Roll Conquers Europe - Rockin´ Around Europe 1958" including a CD, Hydra Records 2024)

== Later Comets recordings ==
Several of the post-Haley contingents of Comets had their own single and album releases:

- The 1981–82 Comets reunion group recorded on single in 1982, Bring Back the Music/The Hawk Talks (Music City Records). Musicians involved in this recording included former Comets Franny Beecher, Al Rappa and Joey Welz. Welz later released a single overdubbing two Haley demo recordings using a group of session musicians who were dubbed The Comets for the occasion.
- The Joey Rand version of Bill Haley's Comets recorded an album in the 1980s (We're Back on the Moon Tracks label).
- The John Lane version of Bill Haley's Comets recorded a live album in the early 2000s, along with a Christmas single.
- Al Rappa's version of Bill Haley's Comets have recorded tracks with Joey Welz, including the 2011 album Rock and Roll Survivors released on the Canadian-American label.
- The 1954–55 Comets (a.k.a. The Original Comets) have been the most prolific, recording a number of albums since 1993:
  - We're Gonna Party (Hydra Records, 1993; live album)
  - You're Never Too Old to Rock (Hydra, 1994)
  - The House is Rockin' (Rollercoaster Records, 1998)
  - Still Rockin' Around the Clock (Rollin' Rock Records, 1999)
  - Aged to Perfection (Rollin' Rock, 2001)
  - Bill Haley's Original Comets (CD-DVD dual-disc release; Bradley House Records, 2003; live recordings)
  - The fathers of Rock ´n´Roll - Live In Concert (DVD, Hydra Records, 2004)

The group has also appeared as guest stars on a number of other recordings by Andy Lee Lang, Schurli Weiss and others.

== Chart positions (US and UK) ==
1953

- Billboard or Cash Box charts:
- "Crazy Man, Crazy" – # 11, Cashbox; # 12, Billboard, June 27, 1953
- "Fractured" – No. 24, Billboard, August 1953
- "Live It Up" – No. 25, Billboard, October 1953

1954

- "Rock Around the Clock" – US # 23 on May 29, 1954, Billboard [for only one week]; # 36, July 3, 1954, Cash Box; UK # 17, 12/1954
- "Shake, Rattle and Roll" – US # 7, Billboard [08/54]; # 6, Cash Box, 11/13/1954; # 4 UK, 12/1954

1955

- "Dim, Dim the Lights (I Want Some Atmosphere)" – # 11, Billboard; # 10 R&B chart 01/1955
- "Birth of the Boogie" – No. 17, Billboard; # 18, Cashbox, 04/1955
- "Mambo Rock" – (flipside of "Birth Of The Boogie") # 17, Billboard, US; # 14, UK, 04/1955
- "Rock Around the Clock" (1955 re-release) – US R&B No. 3 then # 1 (8 weeks), Billboard, US; # 1 (7 weeks), Cashbox, 06/1955; # 1, UK, 10/1955; UK re-charts # 5, 09/1956; # 24, 12/1956; No. 25, 01/1957; No. 20, 04/1968; No. 34, 05/1968; No. 12 UK then No. 39 US, 04/1974
- "Two Hound Dogs" – # 15, Billboard; # 31, Cashbox, 09/1955
- "Razzle-Dazzle" – (A-side of "Two Hound Dogs") # 15, 09/1955; # 13 UK, 09/1955
- "Burn That Candle" – #9, Billboard, # 13, Cashbox, 11/1955
- "Rock-A-Beatin' Boogie" – (A-side of "Burn That Candle") No. 23, Billboard; No. # 4 RU, 01/1956; # 24 Cashbox, Week ending November 19, 1955

1956

- "See You Later, Alligator" – # 6, 02/1956; # 7 UK, 03/1956; # 12 UK, 09/1956 (new entry)
- "The Saints Rock 'n' Roll" – # 18, 04/1956; # 5 UK, 05/1956
- "R-O-C-K" – (A-side of "The Saints Rock 'n' Roll") # 29, Billboard; # 21, Cashbox, 04/1956
- "Hot Dog Buddy Buddy" – # 36, Cashbox; # 60, Billboard, 06/1956
- "Rockin' Through The Rye" – (flipside of "Hot Dog Buddy Buddy") No. 39, Cashbox; No. 78, Billboard; # 3, UK, 08/1956; # 19 (UK), 01/1957
- "Rip It Up" – # 25, 08/1956; # 4 UK, 11/1956
- "Teenager's Mother (Are You Right?)" – (flipside of "Rip It Up") – No. 45, Cashbox; # 68, Billboard, 08/1956
- "Rudy's Rock" – # 34, Billboard, US; # 38, Cashbox; # 30 (UK), 11/1956; re-charts # 26 (UK), 12/1956
- "Don't Knock The Rock" – # 45, 12/1956; # 5, NME, # 7, RR, UK, 02/1957

1957

- "Rock The Joint" (original 1952 recording) – # 20 UK, 02/1957
- "Forty Cups of Coffee"/"Hook, Line and Sinker" – # 70, Billboard; "Forty Cups of Coffee", No. 46, Cashbox, 04/1957
- "(You Hit the Wrong Note) Billy Goat" – # 60, Billboard; # 54, Cashbox, 06/1957

1958

- "Skinny Minnie" – # 22, Billboard; # 25, Cashbox, 05/1958
- "Lean Jean" – # 67, Billboard; # 52 Cashbox, 08/1958
- "Week End" – (recorded under the name 'The Kingsmen') # 35, Billboard, 11/1958

1959–1960

- "Joey's Song" – # 46, Billboard; # 35, Cashbox, US; # 1 (8 weeks), Kent Music Report, Australia; # 26, Canada, 11/1959
- "Skokiaan (South African Song)" – # 70, 1960
- "Tamiami" – # 79, Cashbox, 03/1960

1974 plus...

- "Rock Around the Clock" – # 39, Billboard; # 36, Cashbox; UK, # 12, 04/1974
- "Haley's Golden Medley" – (posthumous edit of "Rock Around the Clock", "Rock-A-Beatin' Boogie", "Shake, Rattle and Roll", "Choo Choo Ch'Boogie", and "See You Later, Alligator" with "A.B.C. Boogie" as the B-side) # 50, UK, 04/1981
- "Swing The Mood" – (featured samples of the original Decca recordings of "Rock Around the Clock", "Rock-A-Beatin' Boogie", and "Shake, Rattle and Roll" in a mix by 'Jive Bunny and the Mastermixers') No. 1, (5 weeks), UK; No. 11, Billboard, No. 7, Billboard Hot Dance Music/Maxi-Singles Sales, US, 07/1989

== American chart toppers (Top 100) ==
- Launched on January 1, 1955 (coast to coast, under control).
- Rock Around The Clock: enters the "A.C.T." on 21/05/1955 topping on 9/07/1955 for 8 weeks.

== British chart toppers (Top 20) ==
- Also launched on January 1, 1955.
- Rock Around The Clock: enters the B.C.T. on 7/01/1955 reaching No. 17 two weeks later, re-enters on 14/10/1955 topping on 25/11/1955 for 11 weeks then re-enters once again on 21/09/1956 peaking at No. 5 a few weeks later.***Also B.C.T.'s No. 25 in January 1957 dropping out for a week before making its fifth and final re-entry on Columbia/Brunswick at No. 22.

== Mexico, India, and Australia ==
In addition, Bill Haley and the Comets also scored chart hits in Latin America, Mexico, and India during the period 1961–1966 with recordings such as "Twist Español", "Florida Twist", "Spanish Twist", "Caravan Twist", and "Land of a Thousand Dances". Reportedly, "Chick Safari", a 1960 recording, reached the No. 1 position on the Indian musical charts. Both the single "Florida Twist" and the Twist LP Record went to No. 1 in Mexico.

Based on the Billboard Hits of the World chart, Bill Haley and the Comets had the following chart hits in Mexico and India in 1962:

- "Florida Twist", No. 3, Mexico, Billboard Hits of the World, April 21, 1962
- "Caravan Twist", No. 5, Mexico, Billboard Hits of the World, April 28, 1962
- "Spanish Twist", No. 3, India, Billboard Hits of the World, June 30, 1962

In 1964, "Rock Around the Clock" on the Festival label reached no. 8 on the Australian chart:

- "Rock Around the Clock", no. 8, Australia, Billboard Hits of the World, June 13, 1964
