= Shake, Rattle and Roll (album) =

Compilation album by Bill Haley & His Comets
- Released: 1955
- Recorded: Pythian Temple, New York City, 1954-55
- Genre: Rock and roll
- Label: Decca Records
- Producer: Milt Gabler

Bill Haley & His Comets chronology
Rock with Bill Haley and the Comets (1954)	Shake, Rattle and Roll (1955)	Rock Around the Clock (1955)

Shake, Rattle and Roll is an early rock and roll compilation album issued by Decca Records (DL 5560) in 1955, and featuring music by Bill Haley & His Comets. The album, which was issued in a 10-inch format, consisted of recordings previously issued on singles in 1954 and 1955, including the title track, and "Rock Around the Clock", although at the time of this album's release in early 1955, "Rock Around the Clock" had not yet become a major hit. This was Haley's second album, and was one of the first album-length releases of the rock and roll era, predating the release of Elvis Presley's first album by a year.

All the tracks on the album were produced by noted Decca producer Milt Gabler. Later in 1955, Decca reissued the contents of this album in an expanded release, Rock Around the Clock.

The cover art for this album, depicting a cartoon image of Haley and the Comets riding a hot rod, would later be reused by Bear Family Records for their 2006 Haley box set release Rock 'n' Roll Arrives.

== Track listing ==
1. "Shake, Rattle and Roll" (Charles Calhoun)
2. "A.B.C. Boogie" (Al Russel, Max Spickol)
3. "Dim, Dim the Lights" (Beverly Ross, Julius Dixon)
4. "Happy Baby" (Frank Pingatore)
5. "Rock Around the Clock" (Jimmy DeKnight, Max C. Freedman)
6. "Thirteen Women" (Dickie Thompson)
7. "Mambo Rock" (Bix Reichner, Mildred Phillips, Jimmy Ayre)
8. "Birth of the Boogie" (Bill Haley, Billy Williamson, Johnny Grande)

== Personnel ==
- Bill Haley – rhythm guitar, vocals
- Danny Cedrone – lead guitar on 1, 2, 5, 6
- Franny Beecher – lead guitar on 3, 4, 7, 8
- Billy Williamson – steel guitar
- Johnny Grande – piano
- Marshall Lytle – double bass
- Billy Gussak – drums on 1, 2, 3, 4, 5, 6
- Cliff Leeman – drums on 7, 8
- Joey d'Ambrosio – tenor saxophone
- Dick Richards – triangle on 2, tom toms on 8; backing vocals on 1

Although a number of online sources list Panama Francis playing drums on 1 and 2, a letter written by session producer Milt Gabler in the 1990s indicated that Francis was not involved in the recording session.
