= Rock Around the Clock (album) =

1955 compilation album by Bill Haley and His Comets

Compilation album by Bill Haley and His Comets
- Released: December 19, 1955
- Recorded: April 12, 1954–September 23, 1955, Pythian Temple studios, 135 West 70th Street, New York City
- Genre: Rock and roll, rockabilly
- Length: 30:53
- Label: Decca
- Producer: Milt Gabler, Bill Haley

Bill Haley and His Comets chronology
Shake, Rattle and Roll (1955)	Rock Around the Clock (1955)	Rock 'n' Roll Stage Show (1956)

Professional ratings
Review scores
Source	Rating
Allmusic	4/5 stars

Rock Around the Clock is the third album of rock and roll music by Bill Haley and His Comets. Released by Decca Records in December 1955, it was, like the two albums that preceded it, a compilation album of previously issued singles. Eight of the album's 12 songs had been released by Decca earlier in 1955 as the album Shake, Rattle and Roll, but, unlike the previous album, which was in the 10-inch format, Rock Around the Clock was a 12-inch release, so it had space for four additional tracks from 1955. The album was the first by Haley to make the Billboard charts, and was also one of the first album releases in the rock and roll genre to do so.

Some non-American releases of the album, such as that on the Australian label Festival Records (FR12-1102), promoted the album as being the soundtrack for the 1956 film Rock Around the Clock, owing to six of its tracks being included in the film.

All of the album's tracks were recorded in the Decca Records studio located in the Pythian Temple in New York City.

== Track listing ==
Side one
No.	Title	Writer(s)	Length
1.	"Rock Around the Clock"	James E. Myers, Max C. Freedman	2:08
2.	"Shake, Rattle and Roll"	Charles Calhoun	2:31
3.	"A.B.C. Boogie"	Al Russell, Max Spickol	2:29
4.	"Thirteen Women (And Only One Man in Town)"	Dickie Thompson	2:53
5.	"Razzle-Dazzle"	Calhoun	2:43
6.	"Two Hound Dogs"	Bill Haley, Frank Pingatore	2:59
Total length:			15:43

Side two
No.	Title	Writer(s)	Length
1.	"Dim, Dim the Lights (I Want Some Atmosphere)"	Beverly Ross, Julius Dixon	2:31
2.	"Happy Baby"	Pingatore	2:36
3.	"Birth Of The Boogie"	Haley, Billy Williamson, Johnny Grande	2:15
4.	"Mambo Rock"	Bix Reichner, Mildred Phillips, Jimmy Ayre	2:38
5.	"Burn That Candle"	Winfield Scott	2:46
6.	"Rock-A-Beatin' Boogie"	Haley	2:21
Total length:			15:07 30:53

== Personnel ==
- Bill Haley – rhythm guitar, vocals
- Danny Cedrone – lead guitar on 1–4
- Franny Beecher – lead guitar on 5–12
- Billy Williamson – steel guitar
- Johnny Grande – piano
- Marshall Lytle – double bass on 1–10
- Billy Gussak – drums on 1–8
- Joey Ambrose – tenor saxophone on 1–10

=== Additional personnel ===
- Al Rex – double bass on 11, 12
- Cliff Leeman – drums on 9–12
- Rudy Pompilli – tenor saxophone on 11, 12
- Dick Richards – triangle on 3; tom toms on 9; backing vocals on 2, 5, 6

== Charts ==
Album

Year	Chart	Position
1956	Billboard Pop Albums	12

Single

Year	Single	Chart	Position
1955	"(We're Gonna) Rock Around the Clock"	Billboard Black Singles	3
1955	"(We're Gonna) Rock Around the Clock"	Billboard Pop Singles	1
1974	"(We're Gonna) Rock Around the Clock"	Billboard Pop Singles	39

== Re-issue ==
In 2009, the album was re-issued on 180 Gram vinyl, manufactured in Europe, by Doxy Music (catalogue #DOY613).
