= Bill Haley and His Comets (1960 album) =

Studio album by Bill Haley & His Comets
- Released: April 1960
- Recorded: January 1960; New York
- Genre: Rock and roll
- Label: Warner Bros.
- Producer: George Avakian

Bill Haley & His Comets chronology
| Strictly Instrumental (1959) | Bill Haley and His Comets (1960) | Haley's Juke Box (1960) |

Bill Haley and His Comets is the tenth album of rock and roll recordings by Bill Haley & His Comets. Released in April 1960, it was the band's first album release for Warner Bros. Records, following their departure from Decca Records at the end of 1959. The recordings were produced by George Avakian, who succeeded Haley's Decca producer, Milt Gabler.

One of two albums released during a four-month period (the other being Haley's Juke Box), this first album consisted of cover versions of popular rock and roll hits of the 1950s, including re-recordings of Haley's own hits "Rock Around the Clock", "Crazy Man Crazy" and "Shake, Rattle and Roll". The latter song underwent a substantial rearrangement in order to modernize its sound, while the arrangements for the former two were left virtually unchanged from their originals, the major difference being the new versions were recorded in stereo. The album produced no chart hits.

In 1963, Decca Records released an album under its Vocalion Records subsidiary called Bill Haley and the Comets; this was a different selection of recordings.

== Track listing ==
=== Side 1 ===
1. "Crazy Man Crazy" (Bill Haley)
2. "Kansas City" (Jerry Leiber, Mike Stoller)
3. "Love Letters in the Sand" (J. Fred Coots, Nick Kenny, Charles Kenny)
4. "Shake, Rattle and Roll" (Charles Calhoun)
5. "I'm in Love Again" (Dave Bartholomew, Fats Domino)
6. "Stagger Lee" (Traditional; arranged by Lloyd Price)

=== Side 2 ===
1. "Rock Around the Clock" (Jimmy DeKnight, Max Freedman)
2. "I Almost Lost My Mind" (Ivory Joe Hunter)
3. "Blue Suede Shoes" (Carl Perkins)
4. "My Special Angel" (Jimmy Duncan)
5. "Blueberry Hill" (Vincent Rose, Larry Stock, Al Lewis)
6. "Whole Lotta Shakin' Goin On" (Dave "Curlee" Williams)

== Personnel ==
- Bill Haley – rhythm guitar
- Franny Beecher – lead guitar
- Billy Williamson – steel guitar
- Johnny Grande – piano
- Ralph Jones – drums
- Rudy Pompilli – tenor saxophone
- Al Rappa – bass guitar

== Reissues ==
Tracks from this album later appeared on a number of compilation releases, including the 1970 Warner Bros. release Rock 'n' Roll Revival. In 1999, it was incorporated into the Bear Family Records CD box set, The Warner Brothers Years and More.
