= Deal Me a Hand =

Single by Bill Haley and the Saddle Men
- B-side: "Ten Gallon Stetson"
- Released: 1950
- Recorded: 1950
- Studio: WPWA Studio, Chester, Pennsylvania
- Genre: Country
- Length: 3:01
- Label: Keystone
- Songwriter: Artie Clark

Bill Haley and the Saddle Men singles chronology
"Deal Me a Hand" (1950)	"Susan Van Dusan" (1950)

"Deal Me a Hand" is the first single recorded and released by Bill Haley and the Saddle Men, who would later achieve fame under the name Bill Haley & His Comets. The song was composed by Artie Clark and featured "Ten Gallon Stetson" as the B-side. The single did not chart, but it led to more successful endeavors by the group on the Essex label. The song was never reissued until it appeared on the Bear Family Records compilation The Real Birth Of Rock 'n' Roll in 2006.

== Background ==
"Deal Me a Hand" marked the first single released since the partnership was forged between the founding members of the Saddlemen – Bill Haley, Billy Williamson, and Johnny Grande. This group follows Haley's previous endeavor, "Bill Haley and the 4 Aces of Western Swing". Rounding out the recording session was Joe Piccirilli on bass, who would assist the band as a session player. When offered a full-time position in the band, Piccirilli declined, but recommended his brother Al Rex for the position. Rex would go on to be mainstay in the Saddlemen and the Comets.

The Saddlemen were originally signed to Ed Wilson's Keystone Records, a small Philadelphia independent publisher. Haley would go on to release one more record on the label, "Susan Van Dusan" b/w "I'm Not to Blame".

The single's B-side, "Ten Gallon Stetson" marked the first collaboration between Haley and songwriter James E. Myers (credited as Jimmy DeKnight). Haley would go on to record many more Myers compositions, the most successful being "Rock Around the Clock".

== Personnel ==
- Bill Haley – vocals, rhythm guitar
- Billy Williamson – steel guitar
- Johnny Grande – accordion
- Joe Piccirilli – bass
