= Two Hound Dogs =

- "Two Hound Dogs" 45" single

Single by Bill Haley & His Comets

from the album Rock Around the Clock (original version)
- A-side: "Razzle Dazzle"
- Released: June 25, 1955
- Recorded: 1955
- Studio: Pythian Temple, New York City
- Genre: Rock and roll
- Label: Decca
- Songwriters: Bill Haley; Frank Pingatore
- Producer: Milt Gabler

Bill Haley & His Comets singles chronology
"Birth Of The Boogie"/"Mambo Rock" (1955)	"Two Hound Dogs" (1955)	"Burn That Candle"/"Rock-A-Beatin' Boogie" (1955)

"Two Hound Dogs" is a 1955 rock and roll song composed by Bill Haley and Frank Pingatore. The song was released as a Decca single by Bill Haley and His Comets. The Decca single peaked at No. 31 on the Cash Box singles chart.

== Background ==
"Two Hound Dogs" was recorded in 1955 and released as a Decca Records single on June 25, 1955, backed with "Razzle Dazzle", as Decca 29552. "Razzle Dazzle" became the hit reaching No. 15 on the Billboard chart. "Two Hound Dogs" reached No. 31 on the Cash Box chart on the week ending on July 16, 1955, in a three-week chart run. The recording was produced by Milt Gabler at the Pythian Temple studios in New York City and appeared on the 1955 Decca Records album Rock Around the Clock.

The single was also released in the UK on Brunswick Records and in Belgium on Omega.

The song also appeared on the Decca 7-inch EP collection Rock 'N Roll by Bill Haley and His Comets released as ED 2322 in December, 1955.

The single was the Cash Box Disk of the Week: "Two Hound Dogs" backed with "Razzle Dazzle" in the Cash Box issue of July 2, 1955. It was described as a "wild handclapper that starts rocking from the very first note. It was "a sensational two-sider" on which the "boys really kill themselves here and send up a side that just can't miss." The conclusion was that "Haley has another twin-deck money maker that's gonna keep the boxes rockin' all around the clock." It was "a follow-up to their current sensation 'Rock Around the Clock'."

The release of the recording was advertised in Billboard in the June 11, 1955, issue on page 44: "Here they come! Two hound dogs! Their names???? Ask Bill Haley." The names of the two hound dogs were "Rhythm" and "Blues".

== Other album appearances ==
"Two Hound Dogs" also appeared on the 1972 Bill Haley & His Comets album Golden Hits on MCA, the 1976 album R-O-C-K on Universal International, the 1985 album collection From the Original Master Tapes on MCA/Geffen, the 1991 box set The Decca Years & More on Bear Family Records, and the 1999 Universal album The Very Best of Bill Haley.

== Other recordings ==
The Atomics released the song on the album Rock and Roll in Hi-FI on Musidisc. The group The Wellingtons performed "Two Hound Dogs" as part of a multi-artist medley during an episode of the U.S. music TV series Shindig! in 1965. Johnny Dyer recorded the song on his album Jukin' in 1995 on the Blind Pig Records label. Fred Gerard released a version on an EP on President in 1958. Bogusław Wyrobek released the song in July, 1960 on an EP in Poland on the Pronit label.

Van Morrison recorded the song in 2023 on his album Accentuate the Positive which featured his favorite rock and roll songs.

== Personnel ==
- Bill Haley – vocals, rhythm guitar
- Franny Beecher – lead guitar
- Billy Williamson – steel guitar
- Johnny Grande – piano
- Marshall Lytle – bass
- Joey Ambrose - tenor saxophone
- Billy Gussak – drums

== Sources ==
- Jim Dawson, Rock Around the Clock: The Record That Started the Rock Revolution! (San Francisco: Backbeat Books, 2005)
- John W. Haley and John von Hoelle, Sound and Glory (Wilmington, DE: Dyne-American, 1990)
- John Swenson, Bill Haley (London: W.H. Allen, 1982)
