= Haley's Juke Box =

Haley's Juke Box: Songs of the Bill Haley Generation

Studio album by Bill Haley & His Comets
- Released: August 1960
- Recorded: January–February 1960; New York
- Genre: Rock and roll, country
- Label: Warner Bros.
- Producer: George Avakian

Bill Haley & His Comets chronology
Bill Haley and His Comets (1960)	Haley's Juke Box: Songs of the Bill Haley Generation (1960)	Twist (1961)

Haley's Juke Box: Songs of the Bill Haley Generation (often listed in reference books as Bill Haley's Jukebox), was the eleventh studio album by Bill Haley & His Comets. Released by Warner Bros. Records in the summer of 1960, the album was produced by George Avakian.

== Style ==
With this record, Haley attempted to return to his roots as a country music singer, by recording an album of classic country and western songs, one of which, "Candy Kisses", was previously recorded in 1948 for his first single with the Four Aces of Western Swing. The album was also marketed as a rock and roll album, due to the band's reputation. "Candy Kisses" was released as a single (backed by the non-album instrumental, "Tamiami"), but it did not chart. "Tamiami", however, reached number 79 on the Cashbox pop chart.

== Effects on Haley's career ==
According to Haley's biographer, John Swenson, Haley's career was at a low ebb at the time this album was released, and according to Swenson Haley himself ended up promoting the album on radio stations in the Chester, Pennsylvania area; after some last singles in 1961, Haley's two-year contract with Warner Bros. collapsed. Afterwards, Haley began recording for a series of smaller labels in the United States, although he found some success recording for Orfeon Records in Mexico beginning in 1961. His next American album of new recordings, Twisting Knights at the Roundtable on Roulette Records, would not appear until 1962.

Although Haley would continue to record country-western style tracks on occasion during the 1960s, most notably during his tenure with the Mexican label, Orfeon Records, Haley wouldn't record another full country album until the 1971 release, Rock Around the Country for Sonet Records. That later album would include new versions of two tracks featured on Haley's Juke Box: "No Letter Today" and "There's a New Moon Over My Shoulder". According to the recording session files compiled by music historian Chris Gardner, rehearsal recordings of most of the songs on this album exist, but have as yet not been released commercially.

== Track listing ==
1. "Singing the Blues" (Melvin Endsley)
2. "Candy Kisses"
3. "No Letter Today"
4. "This is the Thanks I Get"
5. "Bouquet of Roses"
6. "There's a New Moon Over My Shoulder"
7. "Cold, Cold Heart" (Hank Williams)
8. "The Wild Side of Life"
9. "Anytime" (Herbert Lawson)
10. "Afraid"
11. "I Don't Hurt Anymore"
12. "Detour" (Paul Westmoreland)

== Personnel ==
- Bill Haley – vocal, rhythm guitar
- Franny Beecher – lead guitar
- Billy Williamson – steel guitar
- Johnny Grande – piano
- Ralph Jones – drums
- Rudy Pompilli – tenor saxophone
- Al Rappa – bass guitar

== Reissues ==
Several different LP versions of Haley's Juke Box were released, and the album was also issued to CD. In 1999 its contents were also incorporated into the Bear Family Records box set, The Warner Brothers Years and More.
