= Rock-A-Beatin' Boogie =

Single by Bill Haley & His Comets

from the album Rock Around the Clock
- B-side: "Burn That Candle"
- Released: October 1955
- Recorded: September 22, 1955
- Studio: Pythian Temple studios, 135 West 70th Street, New York City
- Genre: Rock 'n' roll; rockabilly
- Length: 2:17
- Label: Decca
- Songwriter: Bill Haley
- Producer: Milt Gabler

Bill Haley & His Comets singles chronology
| "Razzle-Dazzle/Two Hound Dogs" (1955) | "Rock-A-Beatin' Boogie" (1955) | "See You Later, Alligator" (1956) |

"Rock-A-Beatin' Boogie" is a 1952 song composed by Bill Haley and first recorded by the Esquire Boys in 1952. Bill Haley and the Comets recorded the song in 1955 for Decca. The song was featured in the 1956 movie Rock Around the Clock.

The Bill Haley single peaked at #41 on the Billboard chart in 1955 and #4 in the UK on the Record Retailers chart. The 1954 recording by The Esquire Boys peaked at #42 on the Cash Box singles chart that year.

== Background ==
1955 sheet music cover, Myers Music.

Danny Cedrone recorded the first version of the song with his group the Esquire Boys and "nitery singer" Kay Karol. It was released as a 78 single on Rainbow 200, backed with "If It's Love You Want To Borrow" in December, 1952. A second recording of "Rock-A-Beatin' Boogie", released on Guyden 705-A, was recorded without piano accompaniment or Kay Karol. It reached no. 42 on the Cash Box pop singles chart on October 30, 1954.

"Rock-A-Beatin' Boogie" was also recorded by Bill Haley and the Comets on September 22, 1955 and was released in October 1955 as a single in the U.S. on Decca 29713, backed with "Burn That Candle", as Brunswick 5509 in the UK, as Festival SP45-807 in Australia, and as Decca 333510A in Argentina as "Boogie En Rock". "Rock-A-Beatin' Boogie" reached #41 on Billboard, #24 on Cash Box, and #4 on the UK charts in January, 1956.

The song was featured on the 1970 live album Bill Haley's Scrapbook: Live at the Bitter End on Kama Sutra Records as KSBS 2014 which was recorded on December 16, 1969.

The single appeared on the 1955 Decca album, Rock Around the Clock. The recording was featured on the 1989 song medley "Swing the Mood" by Jive Bunny and the Mastermixers, which was no. 1 for five weeks on the UK charts, becoming the second best-selling single of 1989 in the UK, and also went no. 1 in these countries in 1989: Norway, Ireland, Germany, France, Austria, Australia, and Holland. The single reached no. 11 in the US on the Billboard Hot 100 chart and no. 7 on the Billboard Hot Dance chart.

== Other recordings ==
The song was also recorded by the Treniers in March, 1954, and released as a single as Okeh 7023, Buddy Morrow on Mercury, Johnny Curtis with the Toppers on Tops, Gabe Drake and his Rockets with the Orchestra under Maury Laws on Prom 1135, Willie Restum and His Music on Capitol, Georges Richard on the French 1957 LP Paris Microsill Gem 81, Teddy Raye on a 1961 EP, Fontana 460 788, the Deep River Boys on HMV in 1956, Charlie Gracie on the Just Hangin' Around album, the Ivor and Basil Kirchin Band in the UK (Parlophone R 4140), Artie Malvin and the Rhythm Rockets on Waldorf Music Hall Records MH 33 149 in 1955 on the Rock and Roll album, Artie Malvin with the Deerhill Dudes on the Waldorf 33 BU 2 Rock 'N Roll Jamboree album in 1958, the Cuban group Los Llopis, Truck Stop in 1973, Bogusław Wyrobek, Orchester Klaus Kovarik as an Austrian 45 Donauland single as part of a medley "Rock 'n' Roll-Party", Omar Lamparter, the Dutch band The Tykes, Boris & The Telstars, The Alleycats, the Japanese band Levi Dexter and Magic on 1993 Meldac album, The Original Band, Bill Haley's Original Comets, in 1994, original Comet bassist Marshall Lytle live in concert, Phil Haley and His Comments, Jean Rich, Mary Dunne, and Sharron Skelton on the UK TV show Oh Boy in 1980, The Danish Sharks, the German band Hugo Strasser Und Sein Tanzorchester on the 1979 LP Die Tanzplatte Des Jahres '80, Major Schiffer & Majories, Czech band Olympic on their 1982 Supraphon album Rock and Roll, Rock-Rolf & Hans Satelliter in Sweden, Australian band Trevor Gleeson & Chiodo on an EP, The Jodimars in 1955 for Capitol which was unissued, Boston Rockabilly on the 2005 album It's About Time on REG, J. Lawrence Cook on player piano originally issued as QRS 9224 and reissued as part of a three-song medley entitled "Bill Haley Hits No. 1" on QRS XP-440, and Showaddywaddy in 1991.

The Brian Setzer Orchestra recorded the song in 2000 as a bonus track on the album Vavoom! released in Japan.

Freddie Bell and the Bellboys performed the song on the September 18, 1955 episode of the Dean Martin and Jerry Lewis Colgate Comedy Hour show on NBC.

Mr. Roll and His Rocks recorded the song in 1957 which was released in Brazil.

Milly Scott With Rocky Roll & His Rock 'n' Rollers released it as an A side single on RCA Records in Belgium in 1957.

Artti Records in Los Angeles released an instrumental version of the song for dancing.

Johnny Kay's Rockets released a recording of the song on the 2009 CD Johnny Kay: Tale of a Comet on Hydra.

Bill Haley and the Comets performed the song in Lima, Peru, in 1961 with Al Dean on saxophone, in a radio broadcast version.

== Sources ==
- Dawson, Jim. Rock Around the Clock: The Record That Started the Rock Revolution. Backbeat Books, 2005.
- Haley, John W., and John von Hoelle. Sound and Glory. Dyne-American, 1990.
- Swenson, John. Bill Haley. Star Books, 1982.
