= Shake, Rattle and Roll (disambiguation) =

"Shake, Rattle and Roll" is a 1954 R&B and rock and roll song.

Shake, Rattle and Roll may also refer to:

- Shake, Rattle and Roll (album), a 1955 rock and roll album by Bill Haley & His Comets
- Shake, Rattle, and Roll (TV series), a 1977 Hanna-Barbera television cartoon series
- Shake, Rattle and Roll: An American Love Story, an American television miniseries produced in 1999
- Shake, Rattle & Roll (film series), a horror anthology film series produced in the Philippines since 1984
- Shake Rattle and Roll, a professional wrestling move used by Wayne Farris, "The Honky Tonk Man", such as at 1987's Survivor Series

== See also ==
- Shake, Rattle & Rock! (1956 film), a 1956 musical film
- Shake, Rattle and Rock! (1994 film), a 1994 made-for-TV film, starring Renée Zellweger
- Snake Rattle 'n' Roll, a 1990 video game
