= R-O-C-K =

Single by Bill Haley and His Comets

from the album From the Original Master Tapes
- A-side: "The Saints Rock 'N Roll"
- Released: March 1956
- Recorded: September 1955
- Genre: Rock and roll
- Length: 2:19
- Label: Decca Records
- Songwriter(s): Bill Haley, Arrett "Rusty" Keefer, Ruth Keefer
- Producer(s): Milt Gabler

"R-O-C-K" is a 1956 rock and roll song recorded and co-written by Bill Haley and released as a Decca single. The song appeared in the 1956 Columbia Pictures movie Rock Around the Clock. The single peaked at #16 on Billboard.

== Background ==
"R-O-C-K" was written by Bill Haley, Arrett "Rusty" Keefer, and Ruth Keefer and published by Valley Brook Publications, Inc., Chester, Pennsylvania and by Cinephonic Music in the UK.

The song was recorded on September 22, 1955, at the Pythian Temple studios in New York City. The song was released as a Decca 45 single, 9-29870, backed with "The Saints Rock 'n Roll" on March 26, 1956, in the U.S. The single reached #16 on the Billboard pop singles chart, #15 on the Billboard R&B chart, and #21 on Cash Box.

The song was also recorded on January 5–13, 1956, for the Columbia Pictures film, Rock Around the Clock.

The song was also released as a single in Australia on Festival Records as FS-919, in Belgium, on Omega as 61.055, in Germany, on Brunswick as 12 065, in Canada, Norway, Ireland, and in Italy on Fonit as 2092.

The Comets performed "R-O-C-K" in the 1956 film Rock Around the Clock.

The recording was also released as a 45 single in the UK on Brunswick Records as 45-05565.

The song appeared on the 1972 Decca and MCA career retrospective album Golden Hits and on the 1985 MCA Records compilation album From the Original Master Tapes.

An eponymous LP album was released by the Swedish Sonet Records label in 1976 and on Sun Records in 1979.

The Original Comets, credited as The Original Band, featuring Marshall Lytle, Joey Ambrose, Dick Richards, Johnny Grande, and Franny Beecher, recorded the song in 1999 for Rollin' Rock Records and released it on the Still Rockin' Around the Clock CD album.

The theme of the song is the emergence of rock and roll as a new musical genre with Bill Haley and the Comets at the forefront of establishing the new musical idiom. A line from the song noted that Johann Strauss had "discovered waltzes", W.C. Handy had "found the blues", while Bill Haley "came along with a rockin' song, 'Crazy Man, Crazy', crazy news!" The song was released after the phenomenal and revolutionary success of "Rock Around the Clock" and celebrated rock and roll, which musically would define the era.

== Personnel (original 1955 studio recording) ==
- Bill Haley – vocals, rhythm guitar
- Rudy Pompilli - tenor saxophone
- Franny Beecher – lead guitar
- Billy Williamson – steel guitar
- Johnny Grande – piano
- Al Rex – double bass
- Cliff Leeman – drums

== Other versions ==
The song was recorded on December 7, 1956, by Mr. Roll and His Rocks, the first rock and roll band of Argentina. The recording session was directed by Lalo Schifrin and the band leader was the singer/trombonist Eddie Pequenino. This version was released as a B side in January, 1957. The record was edited in Argentina, Uruguay and Brazil. Finnish singer Esa Pakarinen recorded a version of the song in Finnish which appeared on the 1976 album Pakarock 2. Melvis and His Gentlemen recorded the song in 1989, Johnny Earle in 1998, Rockin Pete Anderson in 2008, and Rockin' the Joint in 2009.

== Sources ==
- Dawson, Jim. Rock Around the Clock: The Record that Started the Rock Revolution (Backbeat Books, 2005. ISBN 0-87930-829-X
- John W. Haley and John von Hoëlle, Sound and Glory (Wilmington, DE: Dyne-American, 1990)
- John Swenson, Bill Haley (London: W.H. Allen, 1982) ISBN 978-0491029476
