= Tamiami =

Tamiami may refer to:

- Tamiami, Florida, a town in Florida, U.S.
- Tamiami Trail, a highway in Florida
- Tamiami Formation, a lagerstätte in southern Florida
- Tamiami Subsea, of the ancient Okeechobean Sea
- "Tamiami", a 1960 instrumental by Bill Haley & His Comets, a non-album track from Haley's Juke Box
