= See You Later, Alligator =

Single by Bill Haley & His Comets
- B-side: "The Paper Boy (On Main Street, U.S.A.)"
- Released: January 1956
- Recorded: December 12, 1955
- Genre: Rock and roll
- Length: 2:45
- Label: Decca Records
- Songwriter: Robert Guidry
- Producer: Milt Gabler

"See You Later, Alligator" is a 1950s rock and roll song written and first recorded by American singer-songwriter Bobby Charles (credited as Robert Guidry). The song was a top ten hit for Bill Haley and His Comets in 1956 in the United States, reaching no. 6 on Billboard and CashBox. In the UK, the single peaked at no. 7.

== History ==
Originally titled "Later, Alligator", the song, based on a 12-bar blues chord structure (141541), was written by Louisiana songwriter Robert Charles Guidry and first recorded by him under his professional name "Bobby Charles" in 1955. Many don’t realize both the alligator and the crocodile were speaking in first person. His recording was released on Chess Records under the title "Later, Alligator" as 1609 in November 1955 backed with "On Bended Knee". Guidry, a Cajun musician, adopted a New Orleans–influenced blues style for the recording. The melody of the song was borrowed from bluesman Guitar Slim's "Later for You, Baby" which was recorded in 1954. Guidry also wrote "Walking to New Orleans", which was recorded by Fats Domino.

The song was also recorded by Roy Hall, who had written and recorded "Whole Lotta Shakin' Goin' On" ten weeks before, on December 1, 1955, at a Nashville session.

== Bill Haley recording ==
The most famous recording of the song, however, was created on December 12, 1955, by Bill Haley & His Comets at a recording session for Decca Records. Unlike most of Haley's recordings for Decca, which were created at the Pythian Temple studio in New York City, (Note: According to John Swenson's book Bill Haley and the biography Sound and Glory by John W. Haley and John von Hoelle, Haley's December 1955 recording session of "See You Later Alligator" coincided with a major change in his recording practices. Up until this point, it had been policy for Haley to use a session musician to play drums on recording sessions (usually Billy Gussak but also Cliff Leeman and David "Panama" Francis, although this last musician is disputed); this despite his hiring of talented and popular drummers to perform on stage with the Comets. In the fall of 1955, Haley hired Ralph Jones as his stage drummer but continued to use session musicians on record; according to Swenson and Haley/von Hoelle, Jones successfully lobbied to be also allowed to record with the group on "See You Later Alligator" and the practice of using session drummers was dropped thereafter (though Haley would return to it in the 1970s).) "Alligator" and its flip-side, "The Paper Boy (On Main Street U.S.A.)", were recorded at the Decca Building in New York. The song was featured in Rock Around the Clock, a musical film Haley and the Comets began shooting in January 1956. Regarding the claim that Decca records released this disk on February 1, 1956, in both 45 and 78 formats, Billboard had already listed the song as debuting on January 14, 1956, on the Best Sellers in Stores chart at no. 25 and on the Top 100 at no. 56. The Decca single peaked at no. 6 on the Billboard and CashBox pop singles chart in 1956.

Haley's arrangement of the song is faster-paced than Guidry's original, and in particular the addition of a two-four beat changed the song from a rhythm and blues "shuffle" to rock and roll. The song also has a more light-hearted beat than the original, starting out with a high-pitched, childlike voice (belonging to Haley's lead guitarist, Franny Beecher) reciting the title of the song. The ending of the song was virtually identical to the conclusion of Haley's earlier hit, "Shake, Rattle and Roll".

Bill Haley's recording of "See You Later, Alligator" popularized a catchphrase already in use at the time, and Princess Margaret of the United Kingdom was quoted as saying it. It would become Haley's third and final million-selling single, although it did not hit the top of the American charts.

Haley and the Comets re-recorded the song several more times: in 1964 for Guest Star Records, a drastically rearranged version for Mexico's Orfeon Records in 1966, and once more in 1968 for Sweden's Sonet Records. It was also a staple of the band's live act. Several post-Haley incarnations of The Comets have also recorded versions of the song. Guidry, under his Bobby Charles pseudonym, re-recorded the song in the 1990s.

1956 sheet music cover for the Bill Haley and the Comets recording on Decca, Arc Music, New York

=== Charts ===
| Chart (1956) | Peak position |
|---|---|
| Netherlands Singles Chart | 7 |
| Chart (1956) | Peak position |
| U.S. Billboard Singles Chart | 6 |
| Chart (1956) | Peak position |
| UK Singles Chart | 7 |
| Chart (1956) | Peak position |
| U.S. CashBox Singles Chart | 6 |

=== Sales ===
| Region | Certification | Certified units/sales |
|---|---|---|
| Cuba | — | 12,000 |

== Other versions ==
- The song was performed on the 1956 album Rock 'n Roll Dance Party Vol.1 by Alan Freed and His Rock 'n' Roll Band featuring The Modernaires on vocals on Coral Records. The Modernaires had been Glenn Miller's vocal ensemble in his orchestra.
- In Spain, the song was covered by a popular group called Parchís, under the title "Hasta luego cocodrilo". In Germany, new German-language lyrics were written for the song, which was retitled "Mr. Patton aus Manhattan"; this version of the song was the subject of European hit recordings by Renee Franke and Werner Hass.
- On Broadway, "See You Later Alligator" was sung by Robert Britton Lyons, portraying Carl Perkins, in the musical Million Dollar Quartet, which opened in New York in April 2010. Lyons also covered the song in the Million Dollar Quartet original Broadway cast recording.
- Dr. Feelgood also recorded a version based on this original in 1986 which reached no. 93 on the singles chart in the UK.
- The song was also recorded by Roy Hall and Otto Bash in 1956.
- Wayne Gibson with the Dynamic Sounds featuring Jimmy Page on lead guitar released the song as a single in August 1964.
- Freddie and the Dreamers also recorded the song for their album of the same name in 1964.
- Sha Na Na recorded the song for their syndicated TV show in 1978.
- Mud, The Shakers, Orion, Millie Small, James Last, Col Joye & The Joy Boys, Rood Adeo & Nighthawks at the Diner, Rock House, Horst Jankowski, Lawrence Welk, and Johnny Earle have also recorded the song.
- In 1967, Bob Dylan and The Band recorded a parody of the song entitled "See You Later, Allen Ginsberg," which was released on The Bootleg Series Vol. 11: The Basement Tapes Complete in November 2014.
- The title "See You Later Alligator" is not exclusive to this composition, and numerous other unrelated songs by this name have been recorded, including songs for children and a 2008 recording by Lana Del Rey.
- Ringo Starr released a recording of the song in 2021 on the charity album Songs in Quarantine, Volume 2.
