= Cowboy Records =

American record label

Cowboy Records was a record label in Philadelphia, Pennsylvania. It was founded by Buddy DeSylva and Johnny Mercer in 1942. It was later owned by Jimmy DeKnight and Jack Howard. Artists who recorded for the label included Bill Haley, who made his first commercial single release with the label as Bill Haley and the Four Aces of Western Swing.

== See also ==
- List of record labels
