= Birth of the Boogie =

1955 Decca 45, 29418.

"Birth of the Boogie" is a 1955 song composed by Bill Haley with Billy Williamson and Johnny Grande. The song was released as a Decca single by Bill Haley and His Comets, peaking at #17 on the Billboard singles chart.

== Background ==
"Birth of the Boogie" was recorded on January 5, 1955 and released as a Decca single 29418, backed with "Mambo Rock". The single reached #17 on the Billboard chart and #18 on the Cash Box chart in April, 1955. The recording was produced by Milt Gabler at the Pythian Temple studios in New York City and appeared on the 1955 Decca albums Shake, Rattle and Roll and Rock Around the Clock.

The 1955 recording was included on the 1972 MCA career retrospective compilation album Golden Hits and the 1985 From the Original Master Tapes CD album.

The track appeared in the 1992 Russian film Novyy Odeon.

== Other versions ==
Bill Turner & Blue Smoke performed the song live on The Frankie Waters Show in New York in 1997. The song has been performed in concert by Bill Haley's Original Comets featuring Marshall Lytle, Joey Ambrose, Dick Richards, Franny Beecher, and Johnny Grande, since 1989. Marshall Lytle, Joey Ambrose, and Dick Richards performed the song live in Berlin, Germany in 2007. The Peruvian band Eulogio Molina y sus Rock and Rollers recorded the song in 1958. The Blue Cats recorded the song on their 1982 Rockhouse album The Fight Back. The Twisters featured the song on their 1999 Full Swing album Fulla Hot Air. The German band The Bel Airs recorded the song in 2000. Italian singer and actor Adriano Celentano recorded the song in an Italian-language version entitled "L'ora del rock" in 1969 with Italian lyrics by Luciano Beretta and Miki Del Prete which appeared on the 1981 Clan Celentano S.r.l. album Deus. The song has also been performed in concert by Bill Haley's Comets, Rockin' The Joint, Rockhouse, Franny and the Fireballs in Hamburg, Germany in 2010, Johnny & Fifty's in 2010 in Sapporo, Japan, and Red Hot Max and the Cats.

"Birth of the Boogie" sheet music, Seabreeze Music, Inc., Chester, PA.

== Personnel ==
- Bill Haley – vocals, rhythm guitar
- Franny Beecher – lead guitar
- Billy Williamson – steel guitar
- Johnny Grande – piano
- Marshall Lytle – bass
- Joey Ambrose - tenor saxophone
- Billy Gussak – drums
- Dick Richards - tom toms

== Sources ==
- Jim Dawson, Rock Around the Clock: The Record That Started the Rock Revolution! (San Francisco: Backbeat Books, 2005)
- John W. Haley and John von Hoelle, Sound and Glory (Wilmington, DE: Dyne-American, 1990)
- John Swenson, Bill Haley (London: W.H. Allen, 1982)
