= Danny Cedrone =

American guitarist and bandleader (1920–1954)

- Born: Donato Joseph Cedrone; June 20, 1920; Jamesville, New York, United States
- Died: June 17, 1954 (aged 33) Philadelphia, Pennsylvania, U.S.
- Genres: Rock and roll
- Occupations: Guitarist, bandleader
- Instrument: Guitar
- Years active: 1940s–1954
- Formerly of: Bill Haley & His Comets, The Esquire Boys

Donato Joseph "Danny" Cedrone (June 20, 1920 – June 17, 1954) was an American guitarist and bandleader, best known for his work with Bill Haley & His Comets on their epochal "Rock Around the Clock" in 1954.

== Career ==
1952 recording of "Rock-A-Beatin' Boogie" released as a Rainbow Records 78, 200.

Cedrone was born in Jamesville, New York. He had four brothers: Tony, Joseph, Luciano, and Clementino; and four sisters: Laura, Alba, Mary, and Anita. Cedrone's musical career began in the 1940s, but he came into his own in the early 1950s, first as a session guitarist hired by what was then a country and western musical group based in Chester, Pennsylvania, called Bill Haley and His Saddlemen. In 1951, Cedrone played lead on their recording of "Rocket 88", which is considered one of the first acknowledged rock and roll recordings.

At around that time, Cedrone formed his own group, The Esquire Boys, and this is believed to be one of the reasons he never joined Haley's group as a full-time member. In 1952, Cedrone played lead guitar on Haley's version of "Rock the Joint", and his swift guitar solo, which combined a jazz-influenced first half followed by a lightning-fast down-scale run, was a highlight of the recording. (Haley's piano player, Johnny Grande, later described this solo as a "trademark" that Cedrone often used.)

Cedrone's involvement with the Esquire Boys kept him off of Haley's recording schedule for most of 1952 and 1953 (noted jazz guitarist Art Ryerson replaced him). During this time, Cedrone made a number of recordings with the Esquires, most notably two versions of the Bill Haley composition "Rock-A-Beatin' Boogie", several years before Haley would record it himself. The first version was released in December 1952 on Rainbow Records as 200. The Esquire Boys recorded a second version of "Rock-A-Beatin' Boogie" in 1954 released as Guyden 705-A, which reached no. 42 on the Cashbox pop singles chart on October 30, 1954.

"Rock-A-Beatin' Boogie" would also be recorded by Bill Haley and the Comets in 1955 on Decca, Buddy Morrow on Mercury, Johnny Curtis with the Toppers on Tops, Gabe Drake and his Rockets with the Orchestra under Maury Laws on Prom 1135, Willie Restum and His Music on Capitol, the Deep River Boys on HMV in 1956, Ivor and the Basil Kirchin Band in the UK, Artie Malvin and the Rhythm Rockets on Waldorf Music Hall Records MH 33 149 in 1955 on the Rock and Roll album, Artie Malvin with the Deerhill Dudes on the Waldorf 33 BU 2 Rock 'N Roll Jamboree album in 1958, The Treniers on Okeh 7023, Truck Stop in 1973, Omar Lamparter, The Original Band, The Danish Sharks, The Jodimars in 1955 for Capitol which was unissued, and the Brian Setzer Orchestra in 2000.

Cedrone returned to work with Haley's group in 1954, by which time it had been renamed The Comets. He played a key role in the band's first recording session for Decca Records on April 12, 1954, when they recorded "Rock Around the Clock" in New York City.

According to the book Rock Around the Clock by Jim Dawson, Cedrone had been unable to attend the session rehearsal and was uncertain what to play for the first instrumental break in the song. One of the Comets (accounts differ as to exactly who) suggested Cedrone repeat the solo he had played on "Rock the Joint", although Danny's wife Millie and daughter Marie recall an informal rehearsal at their home in South Philadelphia after dinner where the two men ran through a few solos, and the "Rock the Joint" break was one of them.

Cedrone was paid only $21 for his work on the session ($260.68 in 2026), as at that time Haley chose not to hire a full-time guitarist for his group. Cedrone also played on the June 7, 1954, recording session for Haley's version of "Shake, Rattle and Roll" although he was not allotted the chance for another notable guitar solo.

On June 17, ten days after this session and three days before his 34th birthday, Cedrone died of a broken neck after falling down a staircase (some sources say he died of a heart attack). His place as session musician in the Comets was taken by Franny Beecher, who would later graduate to full Comets member.

Eight months after Cedrone's death, "Rock Around the Clock" was included on the opening credits of the film Blackboard Jungle and became the first rock and roll recording to hit the top of the American charts. Subsequently the song was performed on TV many times by Haley and the Comets; on several occasions (depending upon the demands of the program) the band would lip-synch to the 1954 recording. As a result, footage exists of both Bill Haley (on The Milton Berle Show) and Franny Beecher (American Bandstand and the 1956 film, Rock Around the Clock) miming to Cedrone's original solo. Beecher, himself an acclaimed and respected guitarist, did not begin to actually emulate Cedrone's solo until as late as the 1980s. Up until that point, Beecher replaced the down-scale run that Cedrone used to conclude his "Clock" guitar solo with a series of fast arpeggios.

== Personal life and legacy ==
Cedrone had four daughters with wife Millie. His family had attempted to get Cedrone named to the Rock and Roll Hall of Fame where his guitar has been on display in the Hall since 1998 (this is due to the Hall changing its rules a few years back to allow noted session musicians and backing groups to be admitted separately; previously only Bill Haley (not The Comets or individual members thereof) was a member of the Hall. Cedrone was finally inducted into the Rock and Roll Hall of Fame as a member of the Comets in 2012, by a special committee aiming to correct the mistake of not inducting the band with Bill Haley in 1987. Numerous guitar players over the years, including Jimi Hendrix, Pete Townshend, Big Jim Sullivan, Chris Spedding, Brian Setzer, Danny Gatton, Reverend Horton Heat and the group Ten Years After have gone on record as naming Cedrone's solo on "Rock Around the Clock" as an influence on their own work.

== Recordings with Haley ==
Although well-identified with Bill Haley & His Comets, Cedrone only appears on a handful of the group's recordings. This is a list of the known Haley recordings on which Cedrone is either believed to have performed or has been confirmed, including recordings when the band was known as the Saddlemen. Due to a lack of documentation, Cedrone's involvement in recordings from 1951–52 is not confirmed but is supported by anecdotal evidence from surviving musicians, as well as by books such as the Haley biographies Sound and Glory by John Haley and John von Hoelle and Bill Haley by John Swenson. (Additional source: Chris Gardner's Bill Haley Database at Bill Haley Central.com)

- "Rocket 88" (June 14, 1951)
- "Tearstains On My Heart" (B-side of above; same recording date)
- "I'm Crying" (August 1951)
- "Pretty Baby" (B-side of above; same recording date)
- "Tag Along" (unreleased recording, August 1951)
- "A Year Ago This Christmas" (October 1951)
- "I Don't Want to Be Alone This Christmas" (B-side of above)
- "Sundown Boogie" (January 1952) – note: the A-side of this recording, "Jukebox Cannonball", does not feature a lead guitar.
- "Rock the Joint" (April 1952) – note: this is the earliest recording on which Cedrone's involvement is definitely confirmed. According to Cedrone's children, he did not perform on the song's B-side, "Icy Heart".
- "Dance With a Dolly" (1952)
- "Rockin' Chair On the Moon" (1952)
- "Stop Beatin' Around the Mulberry Bush" (1952)
- "Real Rock Drive" (1952)
- "Rock Around the Clock" (April 12, 1954)
- "Thirteen Women" (B-side of above)
- "Shake, Rattle and Roll" (June 7, 1954)
- "ABC Boogie" (B-side of above)

Some sources such as Swenson's biography of Haley erroneously indicate that Cedrone performed on "Crazy Man Crazy" and other recordings in 1953, however during these sessions the lead guitar player (per Gardner) was Art Ryerson. According to Gardner's database, a second unreleased recording from the August 1951 recording session may exist, but to date it has yet to be located and identified.

No film footage or live performance recordings of Cedrone performing with the Comets is known to exist, and it is believed that he never performed with the band on stage.

The Esquire Boys featuring Danny Cedrone, second from right, early 1950s.

== Esquire Boys discography ==
1954 recording of "Rock-A-Beatin' Boogie" released as a Guyden 45, 705A.

- "Darling Come Back To Me"/"Forgetting You" with Kay Karol, Top Tune 447, 1951 (reissued as Rainbow 178 in 1952).
- "We Drifted Apart"/"Caravan", Rainbow 188, 1952
- "Rock-A-Beatin' Boogie"[Version #1]/"If It's Love You Want To Borrow" with Kay Karol, Rainbow 200, 1952.
- "Guitar Boogie Shuffle"/"Taboo", Nickelodeon 102, 1953
- "Rock-A-Beatin' Boogie"[Version #2]/"St. Louis Blues", Guyden 705, 1954, #42, Cashbox, October 30, 1954

Note: Guyden 705 was also released as a 45 single in Belgium on the Ronnex Records label as 1703.

The band was still active after Cedrone's death, but disbanded in the late 1950s.

== See also ==
- Bill Haley and his Comets
- Rock Around the Clock

== Sources ==
- Dawson: Rock Around the Clock: The Record That Started the Rock Revolution (Backbeat Books, 2005)
- John W. Haley and John von Hoelle: Sound and Glory (Dyne-American, 1990)
- John Swenson: Bill Haley (Star Books, 1982)
