= Holiday Records =

American rock and roll record label (early 1950s)

Holiday Records was an American record label based out of Philadelphia, Pennsylvania which was active in the early 1950s. Owned by Dave Miller, who also owned Essex Records, it is best known for releasing some of the earliest recordings widely identified as rock and roll, most notably "Rocket 88" by Bill Haley and His Saddlemen (later known as The Comets) in 1951.

== History ==
Dave Miller owned a radio station based in Chester, Pennsylvania in the late 1940s and early 1950s. He also owned the record labels, Holiday and Essex Records. In 1947, he hired a young musician named Bill Haley to work at his radio station. Haley had a band called the Four Aces of Western Swing which disbanded in 1949-1950 to form the Saddlemen. The group acted as the radio station house band, playing country music live on air.

According to Miller, in a 1980 interview with Stuart Colman for BBC Radio, he took a business trip to the Southern United States in 1951, and obtained a copy of Rocket 88, a rhythm and blues record written by Ike Turner for his Kings of Rhythm and sung by the sax player of the band, Jackie Brenston. The track was recorded at Sam Phillips' Recording Service in Memphis and released on Chess Records of Chicago. Miller hit on the idea of a white singer recording a cover version of a black R&B song so that it could be sold in then-segregated record stores.

Taking the record back to Philadelphia, he got Haley and the Saddlemen to record the song and released it on his Holiday label, with the more traditional country song "Tearstains on My Heart" as the flipside. Haley also recorded other music that was released by Holiday.

This recording is often identified as the first rock and roll song, although many musical historians say it was the Turner-Brentson original that deserved the appellation. Haley and Miller were encouraged by the success of "Rocket 88" and further experiments were recorded, such as "Green Tree Boogie" and "Sundown Boogie", after which Haley moved to Miller's larger Essex label and continued to have more success with early rock and roll, including his 1952 hit "Rock the Joint" and 1953's "Crazy Man, Crazy", an original song that became the first rock song to make the national American sales charts.

Miller disbanded Holiday Records not long after Haley was moved to Essex and the tracks Haley recorded for Holiday were rolled into the Essex catalog. Later, in the early 60's, Haley recorded for Sam Phillips on Holiday Inn Records formed by D. Wayne Foster and Kemmons Wilson.

== See also ==
- List of record labels
