= Orfeon Records =

Orfeon Records was a Turkish producer of phonographs and gramophone records. The first record company in Turkey, it was founded by the Blumenthal Family in 1912. The company was based in Istanbul and was actively producing records until 1924 when it was purchased by Columbia Records. Columbia continued to operate the Orfeon factory in Constantinople until they closed it in the 1970s.
