= Rock Around the Clock (film) =

1956 musical film directed by Fred F. Sears

- Theatrical film poster
- Directed by: Fred F. Sears
- Written by: Robert E. Kent; James B. Gordon
- Produced by: Sam Katzman
- Starring: Bill Haley and His Comets; Alan Freed; The Platters; Freddie Bell and the Bellboys
- Cinematography: Benjamin H. Kline
- Edited by: Saul A. Goodkind; Jack Ogilvie
- Production company: Clover Productions
- Distributed by: Columbia Pictures
- Release date: March 21, 1956
- Running time: 77 minutes
- Country: United States
- Language: English
- Budget: under $500,000 or $300,000
- Box office: $1.1 million (US) or $4 million (world gross)

Rock Around the Clock is a 1956 musical film featuring Bill Haley and His Comets along with Alan Freed, the Platters, Tony Martinez and His Band and Freddie Bell and His Bellboys. It was produced by B-movie king Sam Katzman (who would produce several Elvis Presley films in the 1960s) and directed by Fred F. Sears. It is considered the first major rock and roll musical film.

The film was shot over a short period of time in January 1956 and released in March 1956 to capitalize on Haley's success and the popularity of his multimillion-selling recording "Rock Around the Clock", which had played over the opening credits of the 1955 drama Blackboard Jungle. The same recording was used for the opening of Rock Around the Clock, marking a rare occasion in which the same song opens films released in a short interval. (The recording would be used again to open the 1973 film American Graffiti, set in the same time period.)

== Plot ==
Rock Around the Clock tells a highly fictionalized rendition of how rock and roll was discovered. As band manager Steve Hollis observes that big band dance music is failing to draw audiences any longer, he comes across a new sound that piques his interest. While traveling through a small farming town, he attends the local teenage dance and is introduced to rock and roll music and dancing, in the person of local band Bill Haley & His Comets and their associated dancers. Convinced that rock and roll will be the next big thing, Hollis strikes a deal to manage the group and also strikes up a romance with dancer Lisa Johns.

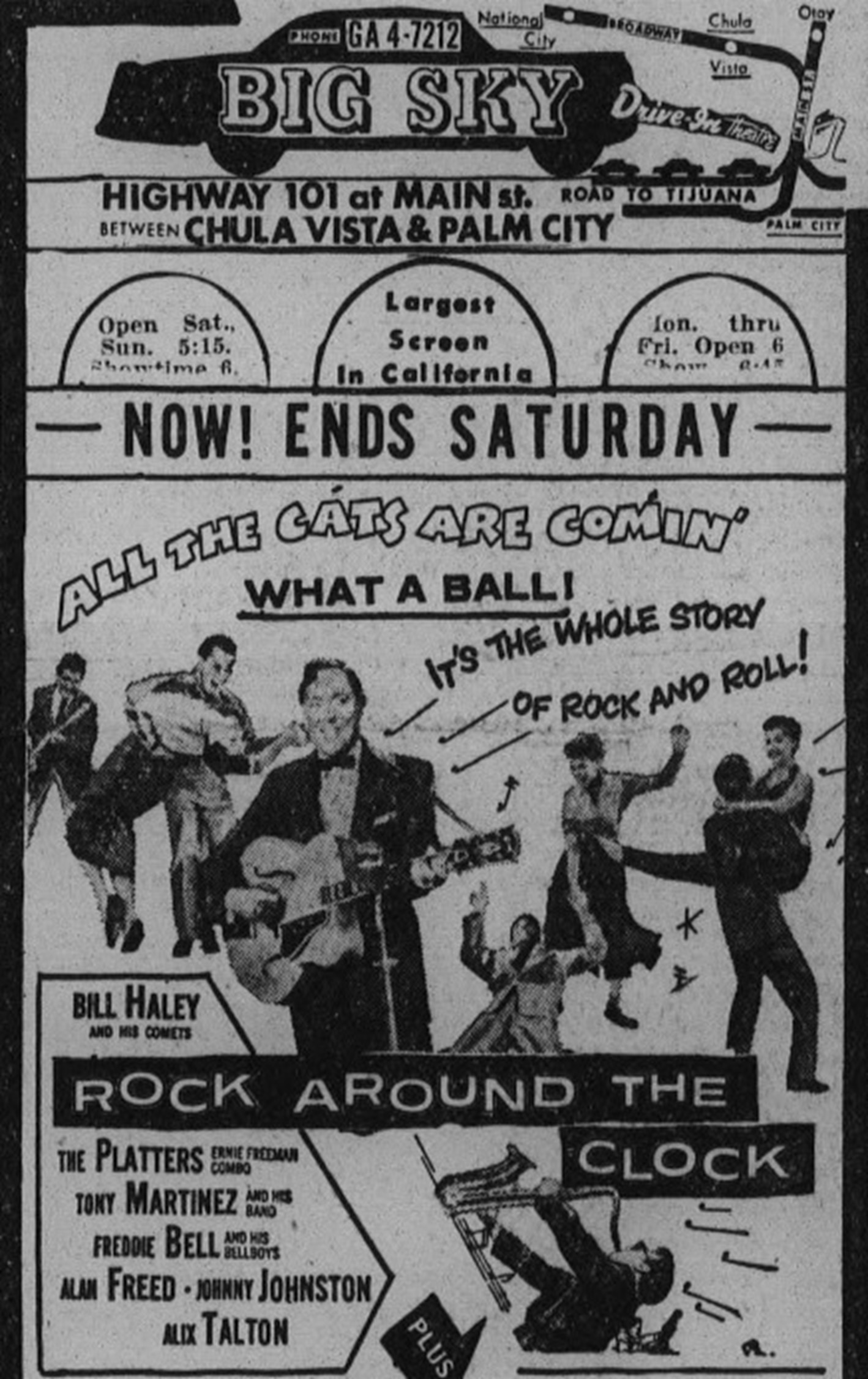
Drive-in advertisement from 1956

Hollis then turns to agent Corinne Talbot, who handles bookings for nearly all of the venues in which Hollis needs the band to play to gain them exposure. Talbot's primary interest in Hollis, however, is to have him marry her as she has been wooing him for some time, and she's determined to prevent him from succeeding without his working directly for her agency, and Lisa in any event. First, she books the band into a traditionally conservative venue, expecting them to reject the band's brash new sound. But instead, the teens and adults there are excited by the music and embrace it enthusiastically. Next, Talbot simply blacklists Hollis and his acts from the venues she controls. But Hollis maneuvers around her by calling in a favor owed to him by disc jockey Alan Freed. The resulting booking in Freed's venue grants the Comets the exposure they need in spite of Talbot's efforts.

Talbot's final play is to agree to sign the group to a three-year contract that will secure their future, but only on the condition that Johns agree not to marry during the term of that contract. Johns agrees to those terms and Talbot launches their career with a national tour, confident that the contract's marriage prohibition will drive a wedge between Hollis and Johns. Once the contract is signed and the tour begins - climaxing in the Comets and other groups appearing on a coast-to-coast television broadcast - Hollis reveals that he and Johns married quickly during the time it took to draw up the contract. Talbot good-naturedly accepts defeat as they watch the TV broadcast end with Lisa and her dancing partner, her brother Jimmy, dancing as the Comets sing "Rock Around the Clock".

== Cast ==
- Alan Freed as Himself
- Johnny Johnston as Steve Hollis
- Alix Talton as Corinne Talbot
- Lisa Gaye as Lisa Johns
- John Archer as Mike Dodd
- Henry Slate as Corny LaSalle

Featuring the musical talents of:

- Bill Haley and His Comets
- The Platters
- Ernie Freeman Combo
- Tony Martinez and His Mambo
- Freddie Bell and His Bellboys

== Songs performed in the film ==
1. "Rock Around the Clock" - Bill Haley and His Comets
2. "See You Later Alligator" - Haley
3. "Rock-A-Beatin' Boogie" - Haley
4. "A.B.C. Boogie" - Haley - first verse only, off-screen
5. "Cuero (Skins)" - Tony Martinez and his Mambo Combo
6. "Mambo Capri" - Martinez
7. "Solo Y Triste (Sad And Lonely)" - Martinez
8. "Razzle-Dazzle" - Haley
9. "Teach You to Rock" - Freddie Bell and the Bellboys
10. "Bacalao Con Papa (Codfish And Potatoes)" - Martinez
11. "Only You (And You Alone)" - The Platters
12. "R-O-C-K" - Haley
13. "Happy Baby" - Haley - first verse and chorus only
14. "Mambo Rock" - Haley - chorus only
15. "Giddy Up a Ding Dong" - Bell
16. "The Great Pretender" - Platters
17. "Rudy's Rock" - Haley

No soundtrack album was released for the film in North America, though some foreign compilation albums were released as a tie-in (such as a reissue of the 1955 album Rock Around the Clock - which included six of the Haley recordings featured in the film - on Festival Records FR12-1102 in Australia, which featured a promotional image from the film on its sleeve). The performance of "Rudy's Rock" is the only Haley song performed live on camera; while an off-air recording from the film would be released in Germany in the 1990s (as part of the Hydra Records Haley compilation album On Screen), a proper studio-quality recording from the set has yet to be released. The band also performs live on camera during a brief rehearsal prior to lip-synching to the Decca recording of "R-O-C-K."

"Rock Around the Clock" is heard three times in the film: once over the opening credits, again in a brief rendition of the opening verse during a montage and again at the end, when only the last verse is heard. "See You Later Alligator" was a new recording that was taped at Decca's Hollywood studio in December 1955 several weeks before filming began.

A few months prior to shooting the film, the Comets had undergone a major change in personnel, with several members leaving the group. As a result, most of the songs lip-synched in the film were recorded by a lineup of musicians different from those shown performing. The only songs on which all musicians shown on screen were also involved in the recording session are "See You Later Alligator," the rehearsal prior to "R-O-C-K" and the live-to-camera rendition of "Rudy's Rock." During the performances of "Rock Around the Clock," Franny Beecher is shown playing the guitar for Danny Cedrone, who had originally been on the recording session, and who had died 18 months earlier. Cedrone's guitar work can also be heard on "ABC Boogie," and its opening bars are performed off-camera.

The two numbers performed by Freddie Bell and the Bellboys are also unique to the film and do not correspond to their studio recordings, with "Giddy Up a Ding Dong" being a noticeably different arrangement from Bell's studio version.

== Impact ==
=== Integration ===
Reflecting Alan Freed's real-life concerts and radio broadcasts, film advanced the cause of integration by showing white musicians performing in the same venues as black and Hispanic performers. At the end of the film, the all-black Platters vocal group briefly shares the stage with the all-white Comets and Bellboys groups. Tony Martinez, an actor-musician born in Puerto Rico, also performs several numbers with his band.

=== Rock-and-roll musicals ===
Rock Around the Clock was a major box-office success, and soon many more rock-and-roll musical films (notably the big-budget "A" picture The Girl Can't Help It) would be produced. Within a year, Elvis Presley (whose first film, 1956's Love Me Tender, was a Western, not a rock-and-roll film) would soon appear in the most popular films of the genre, including Jailhouse Rock and King Creole. Other major films released around this time include Rock, Rock, Rock and The Big Beat.

=== Sequel ===
Later in 1956, Bill Haley and His Comets headlined a loose sequel, Don't Knock the Rock, also directed by Sears and produced by Katzman, and again featuring Alan Freed as himself. Rushed into production to capitalize on the success of Rock Around the Clock, the sequel failed to duplicate the earlier film's success, though it helped popularize one of its performers, Little Richard.

=== Twist Around the Clock ===
In 1961, Katzman produced the similarly titled Twist Around the Clock starring Chubby Checker, which copied the basic plot of Rock Around the Clock, and as such is often referred to as a remake of the Haley film, just five years after the original. As with Rock Around the Clock, it was also followed up with a sequel, Don't Knock the Twist.

=== Riots in Europe ===
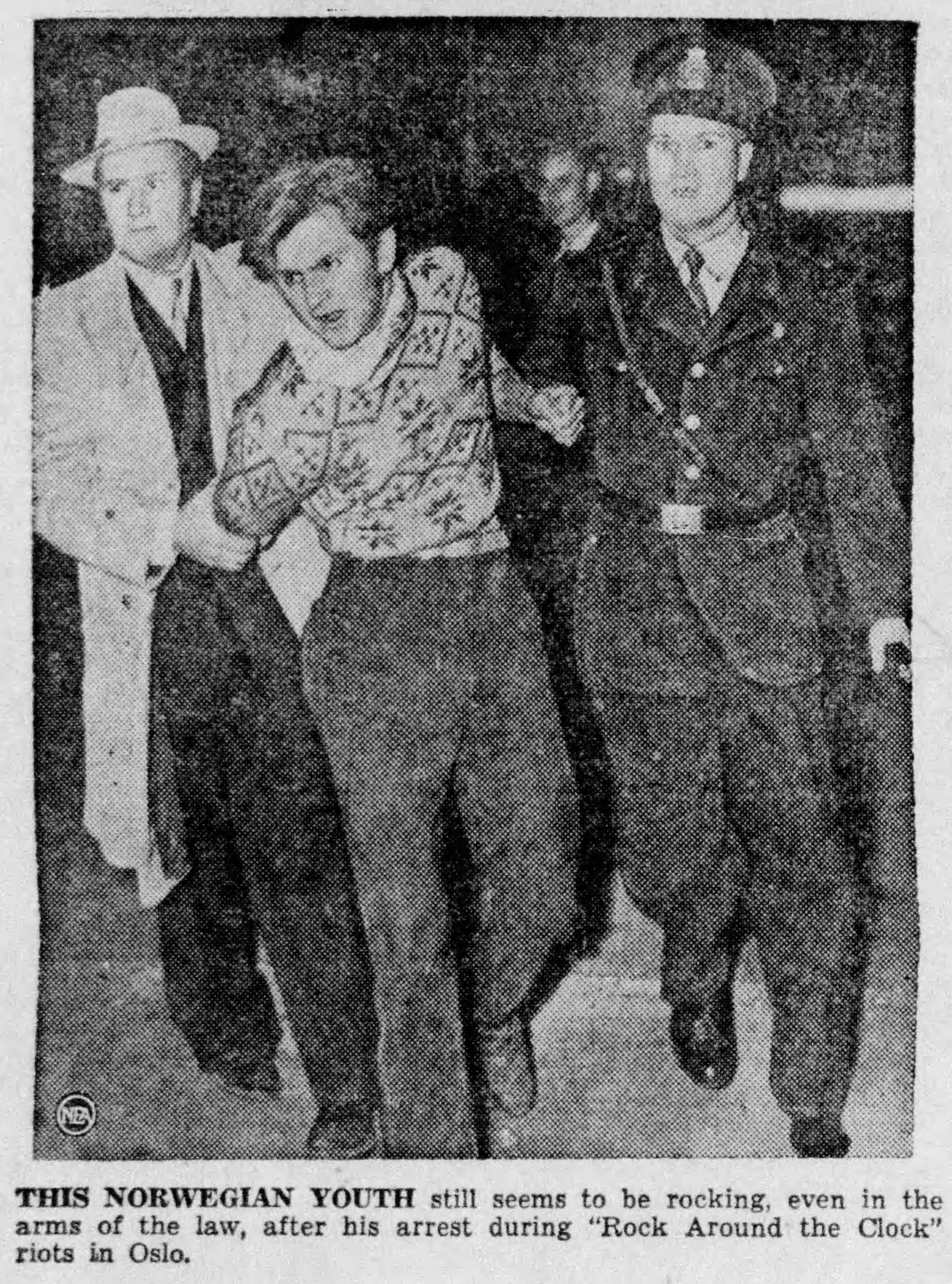
Newspaper clipping from October 1956

Following showings of the film in cinemas in Germany, there would occasionally be riots involving teenagers. This sometimes included the smashing up of the cinema where the movie was shown and clashes with the police. This was attributed to the harsh and strict environment in Germany in combination with an identification of young Germans with the anti-establishment theme of the movie. Riots were also reported in Austria, Denmark, the Republic of Ireland and the United Kingdom, with screenings sparking outbreaks of violence and public disorder in Dublin cinemas. Teddy Boys reportedly ripped up seats with "flick knives", hurled bottles from balconies, and fought fist and chain battles, prompting repeated police intervention and condemnation from Dáil Éireann.

== Home media ==
On January 23, 2007, Sony Pictures released the first Region 1 DVD edition of the film alongside Don't Knock the Rock. However, The film was not released in its original aspect ratio, and was instead cropped for widescreen.

== See also ==
- List of American films of 1956
- Don't Knock the Rock 1956 film
- Twist Around the Clock 1961 film
- Don't Knock the Twist 1962 film
