= Johnny Grande =

Rock and roll musician (1930–2006)

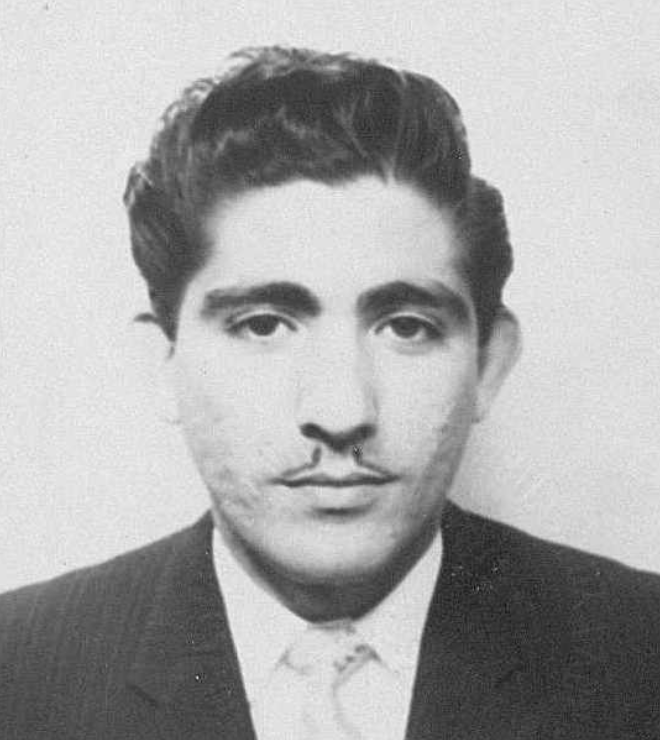
- Grande in 1958

Background information
- Born: John Andrew Grande; January 14, 1930; South Philadelphia, Pennsylvania, U.S.
- Origin: Philadelphia, Pennsylvania, U.S.
- Died: June 3, 2006 (aged 76) Clarksville, Tennessee, U.S.
- Genres: Rock and roll, country, rockabilly
- Occupations: Songwriter, musician
- Instruments: Piano, accordion
- Years active: 1949–2006
- Labels: Decca, London, Brunswick (UK), Cowboy, Atlantic, Keystone, Holiday, Essex, Warner Bros. Records, Orfeón, Dimsa, Guest Star, Logo, Gone, Roulette, Antic, London (UK)

John Andrew Grande (January 14, 1930 – June 3, 2006) was a member of Bill Haley's backing band, The Comets.

== Life and career ==
Born in South Philadelphia, Grande played piano and accordion with Bill Haley and the Saddlemen, later known as Bill Haley & His Comets, from 1949 to 1962-63. One of his jobs was to keep track of musical arrangements for the group as he was one of the few members who could read sheet music.

Grande and steel guitarist Billy Williamson were both members of the country band, Southern Swingsters before convincing Bill Haley to start a new group, the Saddlemen in 1949.

Grande was one of the original business partners who formed the Saddlemen (the other partners being Bill Haley himself (d. 1981) and steel guitarist Billy Williamson (d. 1995)). During the Labor Day weekend of 1952, the Saddlemen, realizing that their musical style was moving away from country and western decided to change their name to The Comets.

Although primarily a piano player, Grande performed on accordion during most live shows as it was easier to transport than a piano, plus the hand-held instrument allowed him to participate more directly in the band's acrobatic instrumentals, such as "Rudy's Rock".

Grande was one of the musicians involved in the classic 1954 recording of "Rock Around the Clock". He also appeared with the band in most of their motion picture appearances, including Rock Around the Clock and Don't Knock the Rock. He left the group in either late 1962 or early 1963 (accounts differ), following a tour of Germany.

In 1987, he reunited with several other members of the 1954-55 Comets and he continued to tour the world, perform and record with the group for the next twenty years.

== Death ==
In the spring of 2006 the onset of ill health forced Grande to temporarily take a hiatus from the Comets, who at the time were engaged in a long-term gig at Dick Clark's American Bandstand Theater in Branson, Missouri. He died in his sleep in Clarksville, Tennessee of cancer-related causes a few weeks later, on June 3, 2006.

== Legacy ==
In 2012, he was inducted into the Rock and Roll Hall of Fame as a member of the Comets by a special committee aimed at correcting the mistake of not inducting the group with Bill Haley in 1987.

== Compositions ==
His compositions included "Birth Of The Boogie", "A Rockin' Little Tune", "Goofin' Around" with Franny Beecher, "Lean Jean", "Better Believe It", "China Twist", "Happy Twist", "Twist del Dia", "Tampico Twist", and "Two Shadows".
