= Pythian Temple (New York City) =

Knights of Pythias building in Manhattan, New York, U.S.

Coordinates: 40.776837°N 73.981054°W

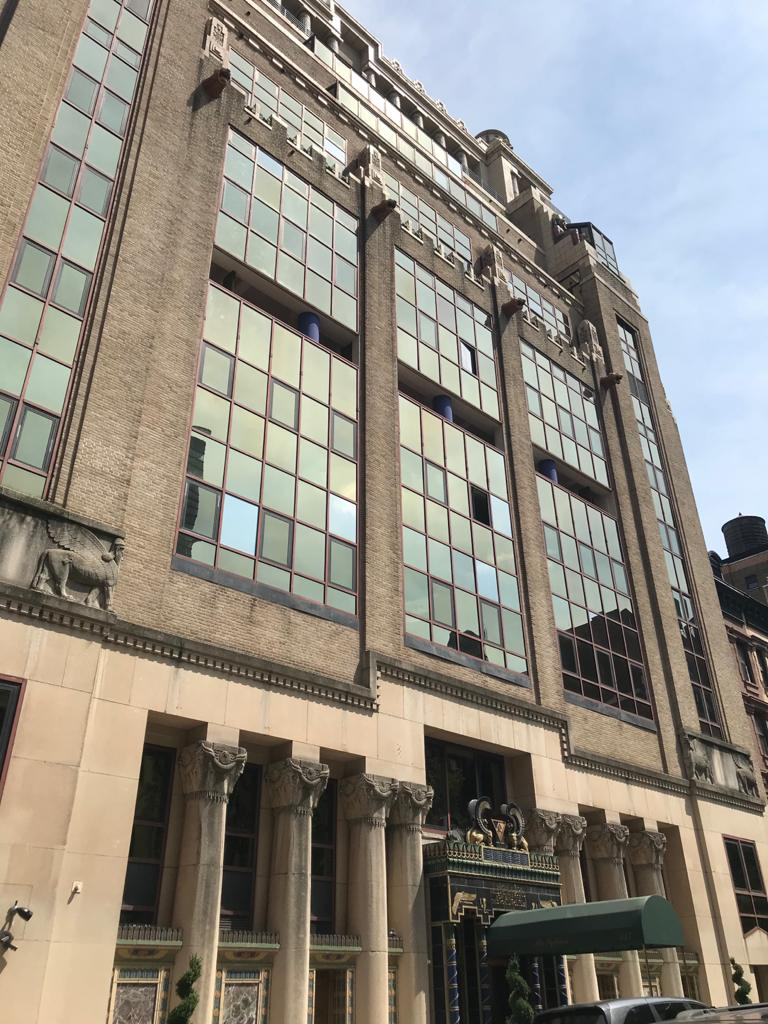
- Pythian Temple in 2020
- Interactive map of the Pythian Temple area

General information
- Architectural style: Egyptian Revival and Art Deco
- Location: 135 West 70th Street, Upper West Side, Manhattan, New York City, United States
- Year built: 1927
- Client: Knights of Pythias

Design and construction
- Architect: Thomas W. Lamb

The Pythian Temple is a historic Knights of Pythias building at 135 West 70th Street between Columbus Avenue and Broadway in the Lincoln Square neighborhood of Manhattan, New York City. It was built in 1927 to serve as a meeting place for the 120 Pythian lodges of New York City, and later for many years housed a recording studio. Today it is an 88-unit luxury condominium building known as The Pythian.

== Architecture ==
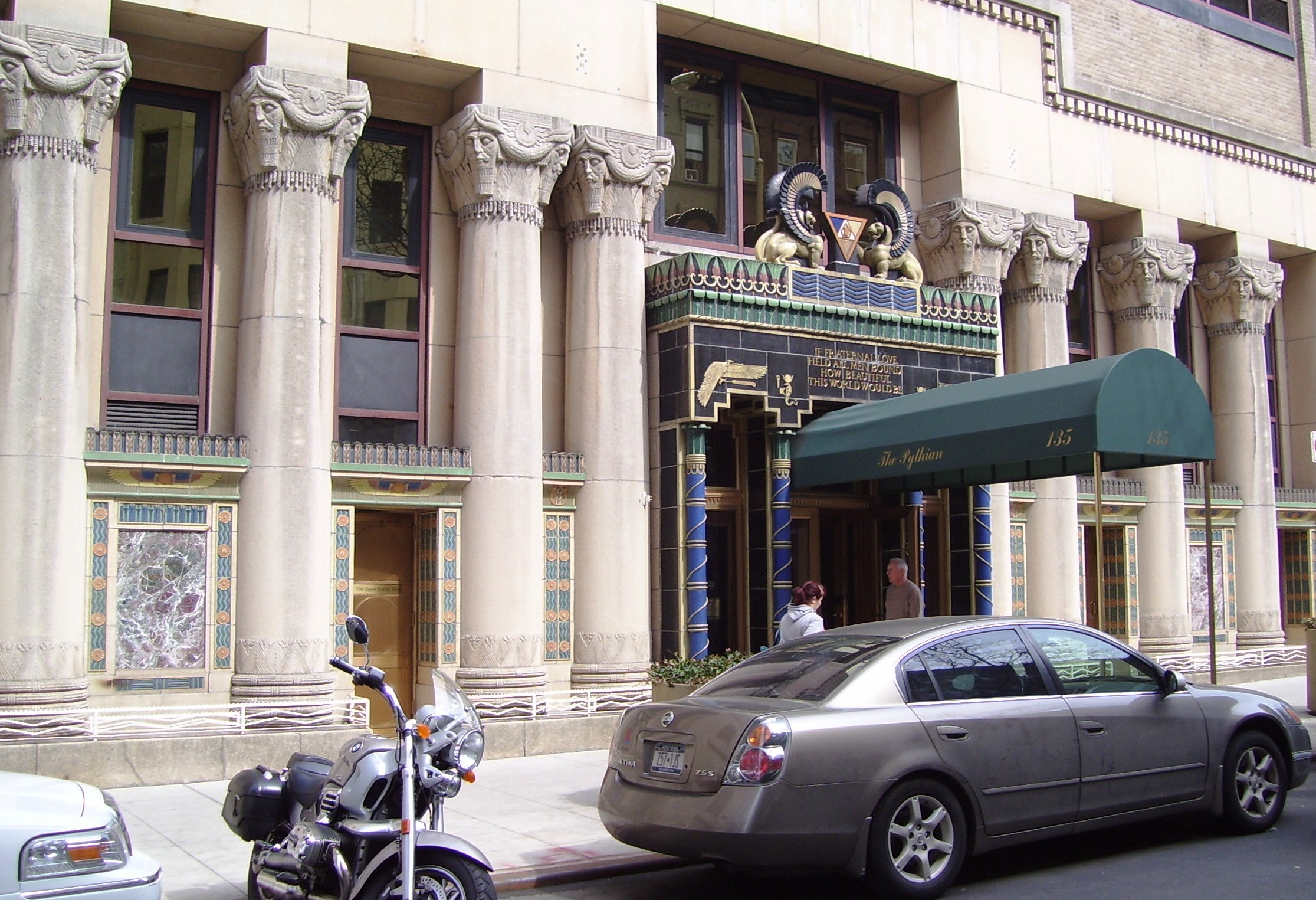
Street-level facade around the entrance

The building is a flamboyant Egyptian Revival Temple in Art Deco style. It was designed by Thomas W. Lamb, an architect noted for designing theaters. He created "a midblock facade of movie-set Egyptian forms, seated Pharaonic figures, polychrome columns and a setback arrangement...Inside, there were 13 lodge rooms and an auditorium decorated in a striking Egyptian manner." The theater had Broadway-quality staging facilities for the fraternal association's professionally produced pageants. The building also had a gym and a bowling alley.

In 2009, the architectural historian Christopher Gray wrote in The New York Times:

The Pythian Temple's ground-floor colonnade, with Assyrian-type heads, is centered on a brilliantly glazed blue terra-cotta entry pavilion. The windowless middle section steps back at about 100 feet up, with four seated Pharaonic figures similar to those of Ramses II at Abu Simbel. Two more setbacks rise to a highly colored Egyptian-style colonnade, and to giant urns carried by teams of yellow, red and green oxen. In a rendering, the urns are lighted with fires. Published photographs of the lobby show a double-height space in what appears to be polished black marble, with Egyptian decor, like a winged orb, or perhaps Isis, over the doorway.

== History ==
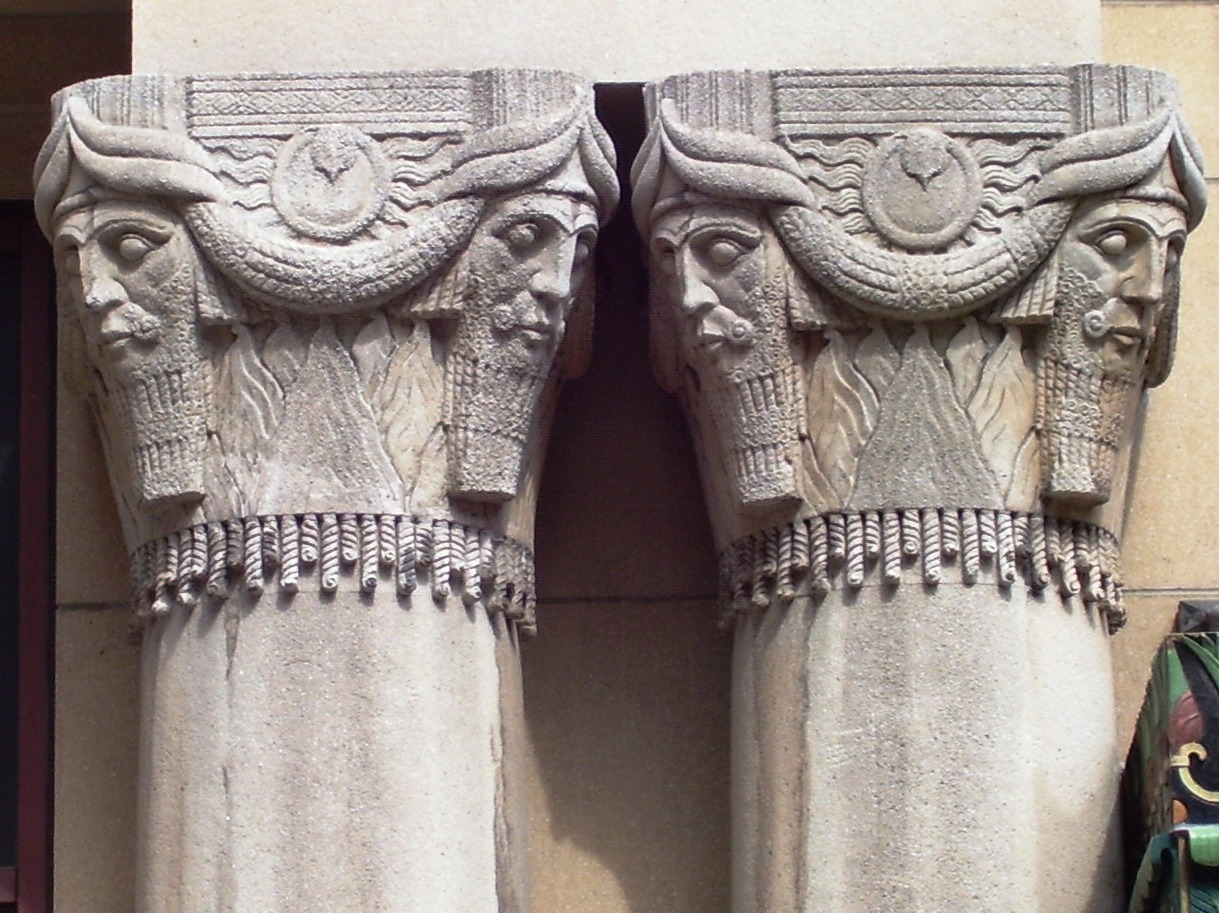
Column capitals

As their organization's popularity declined in the early 1940s, the Pythians leased space in the building to Decca Records, which transformed a large third-floor auditorium with balconies and wooden floors into a music recording studio. On April 12, 1954, Bill Haley and His Comets recorded their single "Rock Around the Clock" at the Pythian Temple studios; they subsequently recorded all but two of their Decca recordings between 1954 and 1964 there.

On October 21, 1958, Buddy Holly's final studio sessions were recorded at the Pythian. Known by Holly fans as "The String Sessions", Holly recorded four songs in an innovative collaboration with the Dick Jacobs Orchestra. These songs were: "True Love Ways" (written by Buddy Holly), "Moondreams" (written by Norman Petty), "Raining In My Heart" (written by Felice and Boudleaux Bryant) and "It Doesn't Matter Anymore" (written by Paul Anka). Other artists who recorded there included Sammy Davis Jr. and Billie Holiday. Henny Youngman, born 18 years before the Pythian was built, told an interviewer that he "took violin lessons" there as a young man.

Days after the Soviet suppression of the Hungarian Revolution of 1956, actor and Communist Party activist Paul Robeson spoke at the Temple. Angry demonstrators threw eggs and fruit at Robeson, audience members, and a number of Pythians did not attend the speech as they left the building.

In May 1958, the building was purchased by the New York Institute of Technology as that college's main campus. At the time, the building still contained the Pythians' memorabilia. Decca's recording studio ultimately remained in use for more than 15 years into the 1960s.

In 1986 the building was converted to residential use by architect David Gura, who won a Residential Design Award for the work from the New York Chapter of the American Institute of Architects. The facade underwent a restoration in 2008–9.

== Notable residents ==
The parents of singer Lady Gaga moved into the building in 1993.

Robert Altman lived in the building from the 1990s until his death in 2006.
