= Shake, Rattle and Roll =

Song first recorded by Big Joe Turner in 1954

Single by Big Joe Turner
- B-side: "You Know I Love You"
- Released: April 1954
- Recorded: New York City, February 15, 1954
- Genre: Rock and roll; rhythm and blues
- Length: 2:57
- Label: Atlantic
- Songwriter: Jesse Stone (as "Charles Calhoun")

Big Joe Turner singles chronology
"TV Mama" (1954)	"Shake, Rattle and Roll" (1954)	"Well All Right" (1954)

"Shake, Rattle and Roll" is a song written in 1954 by Jesse Stone (usually credited as "Charles Calhoun", his songwriting name) and first recorded that year by Big Joe Turner, whose version ranked No. 127 on the Rolling Stone magazine list of The 500 Greatest Songs of All Time.

== Background ==
In early 1954, Ahmet Ertegun of Atlantic Records suggested to Jesse Stone that he write an up-tempo blues for Big Joe Turner, a blues shouter whose career had begun in Kansas City before World War II. Stone played around with various phrases before coming up with "shake, rattle and roll". (Stone used his real name for ASCAP songs, while using the pseudonym "Charles Calhoun" for BMI-registered songs, such as "Shake, Rattle and Roll".)

However, the phrase had been used in earlier songs. In 1910, vaudeville performer Baby Franklin Seals published "You Got to Shake, Rattle and Roll", a ragtime tune about gambling with dice, in New Orleans; in 1919, Al Bernard recorded a version of the song.

== Joe Turner original ==
Turner recorded "Shake, Rattle and Roll" in New York City on February 15, 1954. Atlantic released it as a single in April 1954, that reached number one on the U.S. Billboard R&B chart and number 22 on the Billboard singles chart.

== Bill Haley & His Comets version ==
"Shake, Rattle and Roll"

Single by Bill Haley & His Comets
- B-side: "A.B.C. Boogie"
- Released: August 1954
- Recorded: New York City, June 7, 1954
- Genre: Rock and roll
- Length: 2:26
- Label: Decca
- Songwriter: Charles F. Calhoun

Bill Haley & His Comets singles chronology
"Rock Around the Clock" (1954)	"Shake, Rattle and Roll" (1954)	"Dim, Dim the Lights" (1954)

Bill Haley & His Comets recorded a cover version of the song on June 7, 1954, the same week Turner's version first topped the R&B chart. The Comets provided the instrumental accompaniment: Johnny Grande on piano, Billy Williamson on rhythm guitar, Marshall Lytle on bass, and Joey Ambrose on saxophone. Haley's version was released in August and reached number seven on the Billboard singles chart, spending a total of twenty-seven weeks in the Top 40. In the UK, it peaked at number four.

== Elvis Presley versions ==
Elvis Presley recorded the song twice in a studio setting: a demo recorded at radio station KDAV in Lubbock, Texas in January 1955 while under contract with Sun Records (this recording was not released until the 1990s) and as a 1956 single for RCA Victor.

Introduced by Cleveland disc jockey Bill Randle, rhythm guitar Presley, guitarist Scotty Moore, bassist Bill Black, and drummer D. J. Fontana performed the song in medley with the similar "Flip, Flop and Fly" on the January 28, 1956, broadcast of the Dorsey Brothers Stage Show (Haley's "kitchen" opening verse was sung).

== See also ==
- First rock and roll record
- Shake, Rattle & Roll (film series)
