= Billy Williamson (guitarist) =

American guitarist (1925–1996)

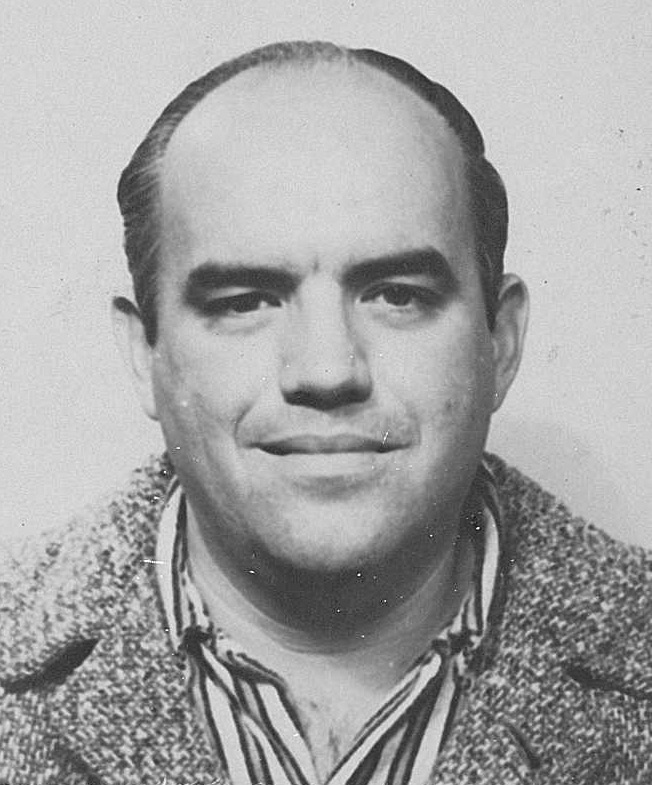
- Williamson in 1958

Background information
- Born: February 9, 1925; Conshohocken, Pennsylvania, U.S.
- Died: March 22, 1996 (aged 71) Swarthmore, Pennsylvania, U.S.
- Instrument: Steel guitar
- Years active: 1949–1963
- Formerly of: Bill Haley & His Comets

William F. Williamson (February 9, 1925 – March 22, 1996) was the American steel guitar player for Bill Haley and His Saddlemen, and its successor group Bill Haley & His Comets, from 1949 to 1963.

== Life and career ==
A founding member of both the Saddlemen and the Comets, Williamson often acted as the band's emcee and comic relief during live concerts; he also played lead guitar on occasion. He was with the band when they recorded "Rock Around the Clock" in 1954 and appeared with the band when they performed the song on the Milton Berle Show and the Ed Sullivan Show in 1955. Williamson had the distinction of being the only Comet allowed to record lead vocal tracks during Haley's tenure at Decca Records (such as the song "Hide and Seek" on their 1956 album, Rock and Roll Stage Show and "B.B. Betty" on the 1958 Bill Haley's Chicks album. He also shared a number of songwriting credits with Haley. His wife, Catherine Cafra, was also credited as co-writer of a number of songs recorded by Haley, including the 1958 hit, "Skinny Minnie."

He appeared in the rock and roll movies Rock Around the Clock and Don't Knock the Rock in 1956, "Hier bin ich - hier bleib' ich" (Here I Am, Here I Stay) in 1959, and Jóvenes y rebeldes and Besito a Papa in 1961.

Williamson left the Comets in early 1963 and reportedly never played another note, declining invitations to join Comets' reunion groups that formed after Haley's death in 1981. He died at the age of 71 in 1996.

In 2012, Williamson was inducted as a member of the Comets into the Rock and Roll Hall of Fame by a special committee, aimed to correct the previous mistake of not inducting the band with Bill Haley in 1987.

== Compositions ==
In 1958, he co-wrote the hit "Week End" with Franny Beecher and Rudy Pompilli, which reached no.35 on the Billboard pop chart when released as a single on East West Records by The Kingsmen, a group made up of The Comets, as East West 115. He co-wrote the follow-up single as well, "The Catwalk", with Franny Beecher, also released on East West as East West 120. His other compositions included "Shaky", "Two Shadows", "Birth Of The Boogie", "Pat-a-Cake", "A Rockin' Little Tune", "The Beak Speaks", "Whistlin' and Walkin' Twist", "Happy Twist", "Tacos de Twist", "Hot to Trot", and "Caroline's Pony". He co-wrote the song "Teenage Love Affair" for the Cook Brothers, who released it as a single on Arcade Records in 1960. He co-wrote the songs "Wee Willie Brown" and "You Were Mean Baby" for Lou Graham which were released as a Coral single in 1958.

== Sources ==
- Jim Dawson, Rock Around the Clock: The Record That Started the Rock Revolution! (San Francisco: Backbeat Books, 2005)
- John W. Haley and John von Hoelle, Sound and Glory (Wilmington, DE: Dyne-American, 1990)
- John Swenson, Bill Haley (London: W.H. Allen, 1982)
