= Rock Around the Clock =

1954 rock and roll song

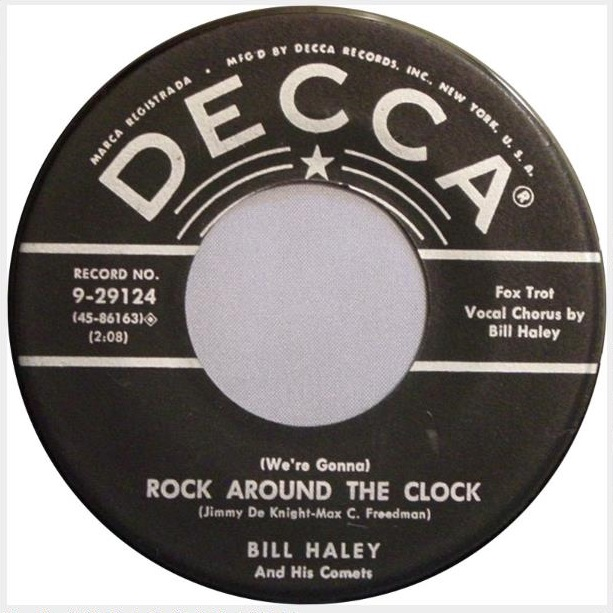
- "Rock Around the Clock" 45" single

Single by Bill Haley & His Comets

from the album Rock Around the Clock (original version)
- A-side: "Thirteen Women (And Only One Man in Town)"
- Released: May 20, 1954 (original); May 1955 (re-release)
- Recorded: April 12, 1954
- Studio: Pythian Temple, New York City
- Genre: Rock and roll; rockabilly
- Length: 2:08 (see length variations)
- Label: Decca
- Songwriters: Max C. Freedman; James E. Myers (as Jimmy DeKnight)
- Producer: Milt Gabler

Bill Haley & His Comets singles chronology
"Chattanooga Choo Choo" / "Straight Jacket" (1954)	"Rock Around the Clock" (1954)	"Shake, Rattle and Roll" (1954)

Audio sample
- "Rock Around the Clock": file; help

"Rock Around the Clock" is an early rock and roll song written by Max C. Freedman and James E. Myers (the latter being under the pseudonym "Jimmy De Knight") in 1952. The best-known and most successful rendition was recorded by Bill Haley & His Comets in 1954 for American Decca. It was a number one single for two months and did well on the United Kingdom charts; the recording also reentered the UK Singles Chart in the 1960s and 1970s.

It was the first rock and roll record to top the pop charts in both the US and UK—Bill Haley had American chart success with "Crazy Man, Crazy" in 1953, and in 1954, "Shake, Rattle and Roll" (originally sung by Big Joe Turner, who reached No. 1 on the Billboard R&B chart.) Haley's recording became an anthem for rebellious 1950s youth, particularly after it was included in the 1955 film Blackboard Jungle. It was number 1 on the pop charts for two months and went to number 3 on the R&B chart.

The recording is widely considered to be the song that, more than any other, brought rock and roll into mainstream culture around the world. The song is ranked No. 159 on Rolling Stone magazine's list of The 500 Greatest Songs of All Time.

Myers claimed the song had been written specifically for Haley but, for legal reasons, Haley was unable to record it himself until April 12, 1954.

The original full title of the song was "We're Gonna Rock Around the Clock Tonight!". This was later shortened to "(We're Gonna) Rock Around the Clock", though this form is generally used only on releases of the 1954 Bill Haley Decca Records recording; most other recordings of this song by Haley and others (including Sonny Dae) shorten this title further to its present form.

In 2018, it was selected for preservation in the National Recording Registry by the Library of Congress as being "culturally, historically, or aesthetically significant".

== False starts ==
There are sources that indicate that "Rock Around the Clock" was written in 1953, but documents uncovered by historian Jim Dawson indicate it was in fact written in late 1952. The original arrangement of the song bore little resemblance to the version recorded by Haley, and was in fact closer to a popular instrumental of the day called "The Syncopated Clock" (written by Leroy Anderson).

The song was credited to Myers (as "Jimmy DeKnight") and Max C. Freedman when it was copyrighted on March 31, 1953. However, its exact authorship is disputed, with many speculating that Freedman wrote the song on his own. There were several earlier songs of the title "Rock Around the Clock" (by Hal Singer and Wally Mercer), but they are unrelated to the Freedman/Myers song. In addition, it is sometimes erroneously stated that "Rock Around the Clock" is copied from a late-1940s Big Joe Turner recording, "Around the Clock Blues". Though the titles are similar, the two songs bear little resemblance. There are many blues songs with the theme of partying or making love "round the clock", with various actions specified at various hours.

However, the verse melody of "Rock Around the Clock" does bear a very close similarity to that of Hank Williams' first hit, "Move It On Over", from 1947.

According to the Haley biographies Bill Haley by John Swenson and Rock Around the Clock by Dawson, the song was offered to Haley by Jimmy Myers in the wake of his first national success, "Crazy Man, Crazy" in 1953, after being copyrighted with the U.S. Library of Congress on March 31. Haley and his Comets began performing the song on stage (Comets bass player Marshall Lytle and drummer Dick Richards say the first performances were in Wildwood, New Jersey at Phil and Eddie's Surf Club), but Dave Miller, his producer, refused to allow Haley to record it for his Essex Records label (Swenson suggests a feud existed between Myers and Miller).

Haley himself claimed to have taken the sheet music into the recording studio at least twice, with Miller ripping up the music each time. Nonetheless, rumors of a 1953 demo recording by Haley persist to this day, although surviving members of the Comets deny this, as did Haley himself (quoted in the Swenson biography); a late-1960s bootleg single of the Decca Records version of "Rock Around the Clock", with "Crazy Man, Crazy" on the B-side and carrying the Essex label, occasionally turns up for sale with the claim that it is the demo version.

Myers next offered the song to Sonny Dae & His Knight and organized the recording on March 20, 1954. The group's subsequent recording, on the Arcade Records label (owned by Haley's manager, Jack Howard), was a regional success, although it sounded very different from what Haley would later record.

Sheet music cover for the recording by Bill Haley and His Comets on DECCA Records, Myers Music, Philadelphia, 1955.

== Decca recording session ==
After leaving Essex Records in the spring of 1954, Bill Haley signed with Decca Records, and the band's first recording session was set for April 12, 1954, at Decca's studios in the Pythian Temple in New York City. The recording session almost failed to take place because the band was traveling on a ferry that got stuck on a sandbar en route to New York from Philadelphia. Once at the studio, producer Milt Gabler (Gabler was the uncle of actor Billy Crystal and had produced Louis Jordan as well as Billie Holiday), insisted the band work on a song entitled "Thirteen Women (and Only One Man in Town)" (written and previously recorded by Dickie Thompson), which Gabler wanted to promote as the A-side of the group's first single for Decca.

Near the end of the session, the band finally recorded a take of "Rock Around the Clock", but Haley's vocals were drowned out by the band. A second take was quickly made with minimal accompaniment while Sammy Davis Jr. waited outside the studio for his turn behind the microphone. Decca engineers later combined the two versions into one version. (Comets piano player Johnny Grande tells a slightly different version, claiming that the only reason a second take was recorded was that the drummer made an error.)

Many musicians have claimed that they performed on the recording session for "Rock Around the Clock". Song co-writer Myers once claimed he had played drums on the piece, although he also claimed to have been advising the sound mixer in the recording booth. According to the official record sheet from the session, however, the musicians on the famous recording are:

- Bill Haley – vocals, rhythm guitar
- Marshall Lytle – double bass
- Franny Beecher – guitar
- Billy Williamson – steel guitar
- Johnny Grande – piano
- Billy Gussak – drums (session musician)
- Danny Cedrone – electric guitar
- Joey Ambrose – tenor saxophone

Dick Richards, Haley's drummer at the time, confirmed in a 2016 interview with Dutch journalist Gerbren Deves, that it was not him, but Gussak playing drums on the recording. Despite not being members of Bill Haley and His Comets, Gussak and Cedrone were trusted session players that Haley had used before. Cedrone's guitar solo was one that he used before on Bill Haley And The Saddlemen's version of "Rock the Joint" in 1952, and is considered one of the classic rock and roll guitar solos of all time. (Cedrone died in a fall down a stairway on June 17, 1954, and never lived to see his contribution become famous and legendary.) The second instrumental break recreates a popular rhythm and blues "out chorus" with tenor sax and guitar emulating the rhythm section.

The version of "Rock Around the Clock" that was used in the movie Blackboard Jungle differs from the hit single version. The difference is in the two solo breaks. The record has the guitar solo taking the first break and the sax solo taking the second break. The movie version is just the opposite with the sax solo coming first.

In a 2005 retrospective on his uncle Milt Gabler's work (The Milt Gabler Story), Billy Crystal identifies Haley's 1954 recording of "Rock Around the Clock" as the single most important song Gabler ever produced. Gabler had previously been responsible for the highly successful string of R&B and jump blues recordings by Louis Jordan in the late 1940s, which were characterised by their strong beat, clearly enunciated lyrics and high production values, all features which Gabler sought to repeat in Haley's recordings. Also significantly, "Rock Around the Clock" was recorded in the very same month that Atlantic Records issued Big Joe Turner's "Shake, Rattle and Roll". In relation to "Rock Around the Clock", Gabler said: "I was aware that rock was starting. I knew what was happening in the Philadelphia area, and "Crazy Man, Crazy" had been a hit about a year before that. It already was starting and I wanted to take it from there."

Although the record is sometimes claimed to be the first in the rock and roll genre, Alexis Petridis of The Guardian wrote that "Rock Around the Clock" and "That's All Right" were generally not considered the first rock and roll records but rather "the first white artists' interpretations of a sound already well-established by black musicians almost a decade before. It was a raucous, driving, unnamed variant of rhythm and blues that came complete with lyrics that talked about 'rocking'." Later in the same article, Petridis relates that Tony Cajiao, then the editor of Now Dig This!, offered the conclusion "... you have to say that Rock Around the Clock was the first record that really brought everything together, that made tremors around the world."

== Slow road to classic hit status ==
As Gabler intended, "Rock Around the Clock" was first issued in May 1954 as a B-side to "Thirteen Women (and Only One Man in Town)". While the song did make the American Cashbox music charts (contrary to popular opinion that it was a flop), it was considered a commercial disappointment. It was not until 1955, when "Rock Around the Clock" was used under the opening credits and four additional times in the film Blackboard Jungle, that the song truly took off.

Many versions of the story behind how "Rock Around the Clock" was chosen for Blackboard Jungle circulated over the years. Recent research, however, reveals that the song was chosen from the collection of young Peter Ford, the son of Blackboard Jungle star Glenn Ford and dancer Eleanor Powell. The producers were looking for a song to represent the type of music the youth of 1955 were listening to. The elder Ford borrowed several records from his son, one of which was Haley's "Rock Around the Clock". In 2004, the song finished at #50 in AFI's 100 Years ... 100 Songs survey of top tunes in American cinema.

On July 9, 1955 "Rock Around the Clock" became the first rock and roll recording to hit the top of Billboard's Pop charts, a feat it repeated on charts around the world. The song stayed at this place for eight weeks. The record was also no.1 for seven weeks on the Cashbox pop singles chart in 1955. The Bill Haley version also hit number three on the R&B charts. Billboard ranked it as the No. 2 song for 1955, behind Perez Prado's "Cherry Pink (and Apple Blossom White)".

In the UK, Haley's "Rock Around the Clock" was released on Brunswick Records (and Germany as well), reaching number 17 on the UK Singles Chart in January 1955, four months before it first entered the US pop charts. The song re-entered the UK chart to reach number one in November 1955 for three weeks, and after a three-week break returned there for a further two weeks in January 1956. It re-entered the charts again in September 1956, reaching number 5. The song was re-issued in 1968, when it made number 20, and again in 1974, when it reached number 12. The song's original release saw it become the UK's first million selling single and it went on to sell over 1.4 million copies in total.

The band performed the song on the May 31, 1955 episode of Texaco Star Theater hosted by Milton Berle in an a cappella and lip-synched versions. On August 7, 1955, the band performed the song on The Ed Sullivan Show, hosted by Ed Sullivan.

On the heels of the song breaking into the Top 20 in the UK in 1968, Decca began plugging the single in the US, where it briefly re-entered the Billboard charts in June 1968, peaking at #118.

"Rock Around the Clock" became wildly popular with teenagers around the world. The single, released by independent label Festival Records in Australia, was the biggest-selling recording in the country at the time. Columbia Pictures cashed in on the new craze by hiring Haley and his band to star in two movies, Rock Around the Clock (1956) and Don't Knock the Rock (1957). In 1957, Haley toured Europe, bringing rock 'n' roll to that continent for the first time.

'It's very hard to tell what made me first decide to play the guitar. Rock Around the Clock by Bill Haley came out when I was ten, and that probably had something to do with it.'

— David Gilmour, from Pink Floyd,

In 1964, Bill Haley and His Comets recorded a sequel song entitled "Dance Around the Clock". Haley actually recorded this song on five occasions (a Spanish-language version for Orfeón of Mexico City and an English version for the US label Newtown Records (both in 1964), two live versions for Buddah Records recorded in New York in 1969 (neither of which were released for 25 years), and once more in Nashville, Tennessee for the Swedish Sonet Records label in 1970). Despite these efforts, the song was not a commercial success.

Haley would re-record "Rock Around the Clock" many times over the years (even scoring a substantial hit with a version recorded for Sonet Records in 1968), but never recaptured the magic. In 1974, the original version of the song returned to the American charts when it was used as the theme for the movie American Graffiti and a re-recorded version by Haley was used as the opening theme for the TV series Happy Days during its first two seasons. In the UK, the song again reached the top 20 and as of 2013 remains the only non-Christmas single to have done so on five occasions. The original version was also featured in the 1978 film Superman, heard playing on a car radio just prior to Glenn Ford's final scene in the film, referencing Ford's role in Blackboard Jungle. In 1981, about a year before Haley's death, a portion of the 1954 recording was featured in the opening credits of Season 6 of Austin City Limits.

During the 1970s, Haley shortened his performances of "Rock Around the Clock", dropping one verse and the second instrumental break from most performances. However, his last known recorded performance of the song, at a November 1979 command performance for Queen Elizabeth II, was a complete version.

Following Haley's death in February 1981, a number of major tributes involving "Rock Around the Clock" occurred. That fall, a TV special marking the 30th anniversary of American Bandstand saw an all-star "supergroup" perform the song (accompanied by 1950s-era footage of Haley and the Comets). In 1982, Haley's original recording was given the Grammy Hall of Fame Award. An excerpt from the recording was included in "Haley's Golden Medley", a hastily compiled single in the "Stars on 45" mold which made the UK record charts in 1982, reaching number 50. In 1989, Haley's original Decca recording was incorporated into the "dance mix" single "Swing The Mood", credited to Jive Bunny and the Mastermixers, but legal considerations forced the album version to substitute a patchwork of re-recordings from the 1950s and 1960s (in Haley's case, a 1968 version of "Rock Around the Clock" recorded for Sonet Records). Since "Swing the Mood" was still on the sales charts going into 1990, it meant that Haley's "Rock Around the Clock", in one way or another, appeared on UK or US sales charts in five consecutive decades.

"Rock Around the Clock" is often cited as the biggest-selling vinyl rock and roll single of all time. The exact number of copies sold has never been audited; however, a figure of at least 25 million was cited by the Guinness Book of World Records in its category "Phonograph records: Biggest Sellers" from the early 1970s until the 1990s, when the advent of compact discs led to Guinness discontinuing the category. Guinness consistently listed "Rock Around the Clock" as having the highest claim of any pop music recording, coming second in sales only to Bing Crosby's 1942 recording of "White Christmas", which was also listed as having sold 25 million copies. Haley's version alone is estimated to have sold 15 million copies, with a total of 25 million copies counting all versions. A frequently used piece of promotion regarding the song is that it is said to be playing somewhere in the world every minute of the day.

== Length variation ==
Although originally released on vinyl 45 and shellac 78 at a running time of 2 minutes and 8 seconds, most digital/CD releases of the original 1954 recording, starting with the "From The Original Master Tapes" compilation of Haley's work with Decca Records, mastered by Steve Hoffman and released in 1985, clock in at 2:10. This is due to the inclusion of a "count-in" by one of the Comets (saying, "One ... two") at the very start of the song. This was never included in the original single or album releases of the song. (All of Haley's subsequent studio rerecordings of the song run longer than 2:10 with the exception of the abbreviated version recorded for Happy Days.) There are no other studio-recorded versions after the 1950s and Happy Days versions.

== Tributes ==
In tribute to the influence of the song and the movie that launched its popularity, the March 29, 2005 50th anniversary of the opening of Blackboard Jungle was marked by several large celebrations in the United States organized by promoter Martin Lewis under the blanket title "Rock Is Fifty". Rock Is Fifty also hosted additional celebrations in Los Angeles in July, 2005, as part of a "Rock Around the Clock-a-Thon" to celebrate the 50th anniversary of the date the song reached the No. 1 spot on the American charts, as well as to observe what would have been Haley's 80th birthday. These events included numerous appearances and performances by surviving members of the original Comets, including the band's induction into the Rock Walk hall of fame, a performance at the Viper Room club on the Sunset Strip, and a special performance for employees of NASA's Jet Propulsion Laboratory in Pasadena to celebrate the success of the Deep Impact space probe. A special video of "Rock Around the Clock" was created to mark the occasion and was featured on NASA's website during July and August 2005. The anniversary was also marked by the publication of a book entirely devoted to the history of the song, Rock Around the Clock: The Record That Started the Rock Revolution, by Jim Dawson.

The United States House of Representatives also recognized the 40th anniversary of the composing of "Rock Around the Clock" with a special statement by Rep. Robert A. Borski of Pennsylvania, which was read into the Congressional Record on March 31, 1993.

1955 UK release as a Brunswick Records 45 single, 45–05317.

The Belgian band Telex covered the song in 1979. They performed the song on Top of the Pops. Their version peaked at number 34 in the UK and number 51 in Australia in 1979.

The Sex Pistols covered it for their soundtrack The Great Rock 'n' Roll Swindle in 1979.

The song was featured in Season 7 of the series Dancing with the Stars in 2008 in a jive dance sequence.

Haley's version appears in a 2017 commercial for Subway's Reuben sandwich promotion.

The 1954 Decca Records studio recording was featured on the ABC TV show Dancing with the Stars: Juniors in the 2018 season during a dance sequence.

John Legend performed the song on the season finale of The Voice on NBC on May 21, 2019, as "Block Around the Clock".

== Albums ==
As Bill Haley's best-known recording, there have been dozens of compilation album releases over the years entitled Rock Around the Clock. The most notable of these compilations was the 1955 Decca Records album Rock Around the Clock (Decca DL 8225) which contained most of the tracks Haley recorded as singles for the label in 1954 and 1955.

Another notable album release entitled Rock Around the Clock was the 1970 Hallmark Records UK release Rock Around the Clock (SHM 668) which was the first British release of a 1968 album entitled Bill Haley's Biggest Hits which had been released in Sweden by Sonet Records. The album consisted of newly recorded renderings of Haley classics from the 1950s, along with some previously unrecorded songs.

== Charts and certifications ==
=== Chart performance ===
==== Weekly charts ====
Chart (1955–1956)	Peak position
Australia (Kent Music Report)	1
Austrian Singles Chart	10
Dutch Singles Chart	4
Flanders (Belgium) Singles Chart	2
German Singles Chart	1
UK Singles (OCC)	1
US Billboard Hot 100	1
US Billboard R&B	3
US Cash Box Top 100	1
Walonia (Belgium) Singles Chart	6

Chart (1966)	Peak position
Canada RPM Top Singles	41

Chart (1968)	Peak position
Canada RPM Top Singles	41
UK Singles (OCC)	20
US Billboard Bubbling Under the Hot 100	118

Chart (1974)	Peak position
Canada RPM Top Singles	26
UK Singles (OCC)	12
US Billboard Hot 100	39
US Cash Box Top 100	36

==== Year-end charts ====
Chart (1955)	Rank
US Billboard Hot 100	2

==== Decade-end charts ====
Chart (1950–59)	Rank
UK	1

== See also ==
- List of Billboard number-one singles of 1955
