= Bill Haley =

American rock and roll music pioneer (1925–1981)

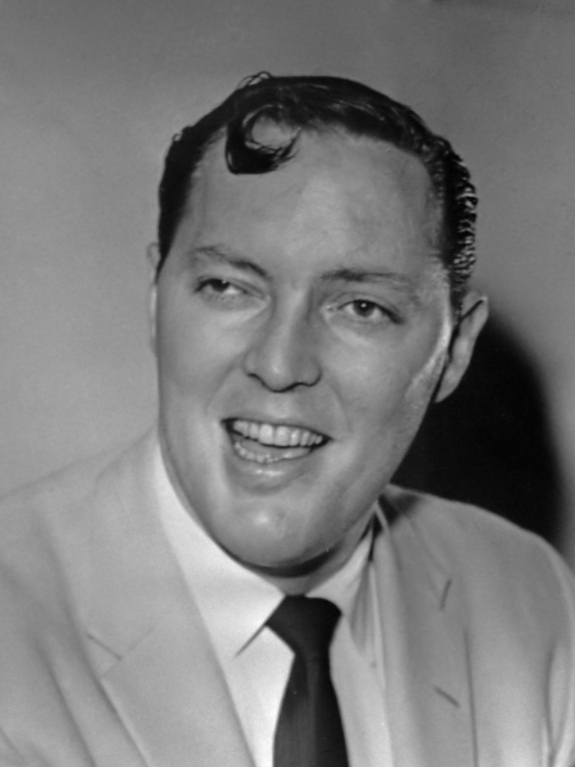
- Haley in 1957

Background information
- Born: William John Clifton Haley; July 6, 1925; Highland Park, Michigan, U.S.
- Origin: Boothwyn, Pennsylvania, U.S.
- Died: February 9, 1981 (aged 55) Harlingen, Texas, U.S.
- Genres: Rock and roll; rockabilly; Western swing
- Occupations: Singer-songwriter; musician; bandleader
- Instruments: Vocals; guitar; double bass
- Years active: 1946–1980
- Labels: Decca; London; Brunswick
- Formerly of: Bill Haley & His Comets; The Down Homers

William John Clifton Haley (/ˈheɪli/; July 6, 1925 – February 9, 1981) was an American rock and roll musician. He is credited by many with first popularizing this form of music in the early 1950s with his group Bill Haley & His Comets and million-selling hits such as "Rock Around the Clock", "See You Later, Alligator", "Shake, Rattle and Roll", "Rocket 88", "Skinny Minnie", and "Razzle Dazzle". Haley has sold over 60 million records worldwide. In 1987, he was posthumously inducted into the Rock and Roll Hall of Fame.

== Early life and career ==
Haley was born July 6, 1925, in Highland Park, Michigan. In 1929, the four-year-old Haley underwent an inner-ear mastoid operation which accidentally severed an optic nerve, leaving him blind in his left eye for the rest of his life. It is said that Haley adopted his trademark kiss curl over his right eye to draw attention from his left, but it also became his gimmick and added to his popularity. As a result of the effects of the Great Depression on the Detroit area, his father moved the family to Bethel Township, Pennsylvania, when Bill was seven years old.

Haley's father William Albert Haley (1900–1956) was from Kentucky and played the banjo and mandolin, and his mother, Maude Green (1895–1955), who was a British immigrant originally from Ulverston, England, was a technically accomplished keyboardist with classical training. Haley told the story that when he made a simulated guitar out of cardboard, his parents bought him a real one.

One of his first appearances was in 1938 for a Bethel Junior baseball team entertainment event, performing guitar and songs when he was 13 years old.

According to the anonymous sleeve notes accompanying the 1956 Decca album Rock Around the Clock, Haley left home at fifteen with his guitar and spent the next few years poverty-stricken until he joined a group called the Down Homers while they were in Hartford, Connecticut. In 1947, Haley formed his own group, Four Aces of Western Swing, later renamed to the Saddlemen. The group subsequently signed with Dave Miller's Holiday Records and, on June 14, 1951, the Saddlemen recorded a cover of the Delta Cats "Rocket 88".

== Bill Haley and His Comets ==
During the Labor Day weekend in 1952, the Saddlemen were renamed Bill Haley with Haley's Comets. The name was inspired by the supposedly official pronunciation of Halley's Comet and was suggested by Bob Johnson, program director at radio station WPWA where Bill Haley had a live radio program from 12:00 noon to 1:00 p.m. In 1953, Haley's recording of "Crazy Man, Crazy" (co-written by Haley and his bass player, Marshall Lytle, although Lytle would not receive credit until 2001) hit the American charts, peaking at number 12 on Billboard and number 11 on Cash Box. Some sources indicate that this was the first rock and roll record in history, although rockabilly might be a more appropriate term. By the time this record was released, the group's name had been revised to using the term "Comets" instead of "Saddlemen".

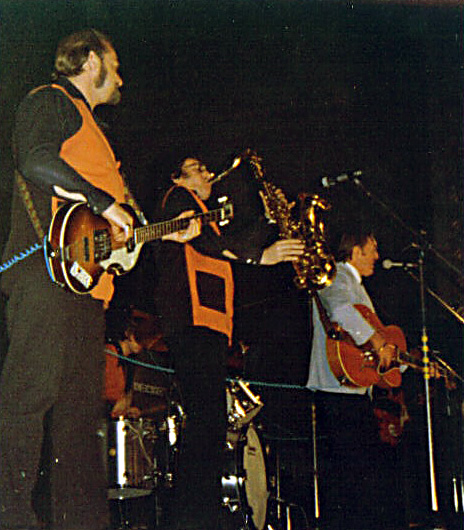
Bill Haley and the Comets performing in 1974

In 1954, Haley recorded "Rock Around the Clock". Initially, it was only a moderate success, peaking at number 36 on the Cash Box pop singles chart and staying on the charts for just two weeks. On re-release, the record reached number one on July 9, 1955.

Haley had already had a worldwide hit with "Shake, Rattle and Roll", another rhythm and blues cover (in this case from Big Joe Turner), which went on to sell a million copies and was the first rock 'n' roll song to enter the UK Singles Chart in December 1954, becoming a gold record. He retained elements of the original (which was slow blues), but sped it up with some country music aspects into the song (specifically, Western swing) and changed up the lyrics. Haley and his band were important in launching the music known as "Rock and Roll" to a wider audience after a period of it being considered an underground genre.

When "Rock Around the Clock" appeared as the theme song of the 1955 film Blackboard Jungle starring Glenn Ford, it soared to the top of the American Billboard chart for eight weeks. The single is commonly used as a convenient line of demarcation between the "rock era" and the music industry that preceded it. Billboard separated its statistical tabulations into 1890–1954 and 1955–present. After the record rose to number one, Haley became widely popular with those who had come to embrace the new style of music. With the song's success, the age of rock music began overnight and ended the dominance of the jazz and pop standards performed by Frank Sinatra, Jo Stafford, Perry Como, Bing Crosby, Eddie Fisher, and Patti Page. "Rock Around the Clock" was also the first record to sell over one million copies in both Britain and Germany. Danny Cedrone, not a member of The Comets, played the guitar solo on the record, though did not live long enough to see the song's success as he died shortly after the recording following a fall down stairs at his home, aged 33.

Bill Haley and the Comets performed "Rock Around the Clock" on the Texaco Star Theater hosted by Milton Berle on May 31, 1955, on NBC in an a cappella and lip-synched version. Berle predicted that the song would go number one: "A group of entertainers who are going right to the top." Berle also sang and danced to the song which was performed by the entire cast of the show. This was one of the earliest nationally televised performances by a rock and roll band and provided the new musical genre with a much wider audience.

Bill Haley and the Comets were the first rock and roll act to appear on American musical variety series the Ed Sullivan Show on August 7, 1955, on CBS in a broadcast that originated from the Shakespeare Festival Theater in Stratford, Connecticut. They performed a live version of "Rock Around the Clock" with Franny Beecher on lead guitar and Dick Richards on drums. The band made their second appearance on the show on Sunday, April 28, 1957, performing the songs "Rudy's Rock" and "Forty Cups of Coffee".

Later on in 1957, Haley became the first major American rock singer to tour Europe. Haley continued to score hits throughout the 1950s such as "See You Later, Alligator" and he starred in the first rock and roll musical films Rock Around the Clock and Don't Knock the Rock, both in 1956. Haley was already 30 years old, and his popularity was soon eclipsed in the United States by the younger Elvis Presley, but continued to enjoy great popularity in Latin America, Europe, and Australia during the 1960s.

Bill Haley and the Comets appeared on American Bandstand hosted by Dick Clark on ABC twice in 1957, on the prime time show October 28, 1957, and on the regular daytime show on November 27, 1957. The band also appeared on Dick Clark's Saturday Night Beechnut Show, also known as The Dick Clark Show, a primetime TV series from New York on March 22, 1958, during the first season and on February 20, 1960, performing "Rock Around the Clock"; "Shake, Rattle and Roll"; and "Tamiami".

== Personal life ==
=== Marriages ===
Haley was married at least thrice:

- Dorothy Crowe (December 11, 1946 – November 14, 1952) (divorced, two children)
- Barbara Joan Cupchak (November 18, 1952 – 1960) (divorced, five children)
- Martha Velasco (c. 1960 – February 9, 1981, his death) (three children)

=== Children ===
Haley had at least 10 children. John W. Haley, his eldest son, wrote Sound and Glory, a biography of Haley. His youngest daughter, Gina Haley, is a professional musician based in Texas. Scott Haley is an athlete. His youngest son Pedro is also a musician.

Haley also had a daughter, Martha Maria, from his marriage with Martha Velasco.

Bill Haley Jr., Haley's second son and first with Joan Barbara "Cuppy" Haley-Hahn, publishes a regional business magazine. In 2011, he formed a tribute band, performing his father's music and telling the stories behind the songs.

== Later career and death ==
Haley failed to achieve the level of success enjoyed by contemporaries such as Little Richard and Jerry Lee Lewis. According to one source, "he had conflicted feelings about fame, was extremely private, suffered chronic alcoholism, and troubled relationships". Having admitted to an alcohol problem in a 1974 radio interview for the BBC, Haley continued to battle alcoholism into the 1970s. Nonetheless, he and his band continued to be a popular touring act, benefiting from a 1950s nostalgia movement that began in the late 1960s and the signing of a lucrative record deal with the European Sonet label. He performed for Queen Elizabeth II at the Royal Variety Performance on November 26, 1979.

The October 25, 1980, issue of German tabloid Bild reported that Haley had a brain tumor. Haley's British manager, Patrick Malynn, was quoted as saying that "Haley had taken a fit [and] didn't recognize anyone anymore." In addition, a doctor who examined Haley said that the tumor was inoperable.

Haley's widow Martha, who was with him in these troubling times, denied he had a brain tumor, as did his close friend Hugh McCallum. Martha and friends related that Haley did not want to go on the road anymore and that ticket sales for that planned tour of Germany in the fall of 1980 were slow. McCallum said, "It's my unproven gut feeling that that [the brain tumor] was said to curtail talks about the tour and play the sympathy card."

At the same time, Haley's alcoholism appeared to be worsening. According to Martha, by this time, she and Haley fought all the time and she told him to stop drinking or move out. Eventually, he moved into a room in their pool house. Martha still took care of him and sometimes, he would come in the house to eat, but he ate very little. "There were days we never saw him", said his daughter Martha Maria. In addition to Haley's drinking problems, it was becoming evident that he was also developing serious mental health issues. Martha Maria said, "It was like sometimes he was drunk even when he wasn't drinking." After being picked up by the police in Harlingen, Texas, several times for alleged intoxication, Martha had a judge put Haley in the hospital, where he was seen by a psychiatrist, who said Haley's brain was overproducing a chemical, like adrenaline. The doctor prescribed a medication to stop the overproduction, but said Haley would have to stop drinking. Martha said, "This is pointless." She took him home, however, fed him and gave him his first dose. As soon as he felt better, he went back out to his room in the pool house, and the downward spiral continued until his death.

Media reports immediately following his death indicated that Haley displayed deranged and erratic behavior in the final weeks of his life. According to a biography of Haley by John Swenson, released in 1982, Haley made a succession of bizarre, mostly monologue late-night phone calls to friends and relatives toward the end of his life in which he was semi-coherent. His first wife has been quoted as saying, "He would call you and ramble, dwelling on the past..." The biography also describes Haley painting the windows of his home black, but there is little other information available about his final days.

Haley died at his home in Harlingen on February 9, 1981, at the age of 55. Haley was discovered lying motionless on his bed by a friend who had stopped by to visit him. The friend immediately called the police and Haley was pronounced dead at the scene. Haley's death certificate gave "natural causes, most likely a heart attack" as being the cause. Following a small funeral service attended by 75 people, Haley was cremated in Brownsville, Texas.

== Tributes and legacy ==
Haley has sold over 60 million records worldwide.

Haley received a star on the Hollywood Walk of Fame at 6350 Hollywood Boulevard on February 8, 1960, for his contributions to the music industry.

In 1982, Haley's "Rock Around the Clock" was inducted into the Grammy Hall of Fame, a special Grammy award established in 1973 to honor recordings at least 25 years old and with "qualitative or historical significance". In 2018, it was selected for preservation in the National Recording Registry by the Library of Congress as being "culturally, historically, or aesthetically significant".

Haley was posthumously inducted into the Rock and Roll Hall of Fame in 1987. His son Pedro represented him at the ceremony. The Comets were separately inducted into the Hall of Fame as a group in 2012, after a rule change allowed the induction of backing groups.

Surviving members of the 1954–55 contingent of Haley's Comets reunited in the late 1980s and continued to perform for many years around the world. By 2014, only two members of this particular contingent were still alive (saxophonist Joey Ambrose and drummer Dick Richards), but they continued to perform in Branson and Europe. In 2019, Richards died at the age of 95, followed by Ambrose's death in 2021 aged 87. Ambrose was considered to be the last surviving original member of the Comets.

In February 2006, the International Astronomical Union announced the naming of asteroid 79896 Billhaley to mark the 25th anniversary of Haley's death.

In March 2007, the Original Comets opened the Bill Haley Museum in Munich, Germany. On October 27, 2007, ex-Comets guitar player Bill Turner opened the Bill Haley Museum for the public.

In December 2017, Haley was inducted into the National Rhythm & Blues Hall of Fame.

== Film portrayals ==
Unlike his contemporaries, Haley has rarely been portrayed on screen. Following the success of The Buddy Holly Story in 1978, Haley expressed interest in having his life story committed to film, but this ultimately never came to fruition.

Haley has been portrayed by:

- John Paramor in Shout! The Story of Johnny O'Keefe (1985)
- Michael Daingerfield in Mr. Rock 'n' Roll: The Alan Freed Story (1999)
- Dicky Barrett in Shake, Rattle and Roll: An American Love Story (1999)
