= Bill Haley's Chicks =

Studio album by Bill Haley and His Comets
- Released: January 5, 1959
- Recorded: February 6–7; June 9–18, 1958; New York
- Genre: Rock and roll
- Label: Decca, Decca 8821
- Producer: Milt Gabler

Bill Haley and His Comets chronology
Rockin' the Joint (1958)	Bill Haley's Chicks (1959)	Strictly Instrumental (1959)

Bill Haley's Chicks was the eighth album of rock and roll recordings by Bill Haley & His Comets for Decca Records, Decca 8821. Released in January 1959 and produced by Milt Gabler, the album was the third "theme" album Haley recorded for Decca, following Rockin' the Oldies (rock and roll versions of standards) and Rockin' Around the World (rock and roll versions of folk songs). This album is built on the theme of women's names, with each song being about a different girl. Included on the album is "Skinny Minnie", which was a major hit for the band in 1958, reaching no.22 on Billboard and no.25 on Cashbox, along with a mixture of originals and cover versions of standards and jazz songs. "Lean Jean", a song musically and thematically almost identical to "Skinny Minnie", also charted in 1958, reaching no. 52 on Cashbox. The song "B.B. Betty", co-written by Bill Haley and released as a Decca 45 single, featured a solo vocal by Haley's steel guitar player, Billy Williamson.

== Track listing ==
1. "Whoa Mabel!" (Bill Haley, Milt Gabler, Rusty Keefer, Catherine Cafra)
2. "Ida, Sweet as Apple Cider" (Eddie Leonard, Eddie Munson)
3. "Eloise" (Bill Haley, Milt Gabler, Rusty Keefer, Catherine Cafra)
4. "Dinah" (Sam M. Lewis, Joe Young, Harry Akst)
5. "Skinny Minnie" (Bill Haley, Milt Gabler, Rusty Keefer, Catherine Cafra)
6. "Mary Mary Lou" (Cayet Mangiaracina)
7. "Sweet Sue, Just You" (Will J. Harris, Victor Young)
8. "B.B. Betty" (Bill Haley, Milt Gabler, Rusty Keefer, Catherine Cafra)
9. "Charmaine" (Erno Rapee, Lew Pollack)
10. "Corrine, Corrina" (Bo Chatmon, Mitchell Parish, J. Mayo Williams)
11. "Marie" (Irving Berlin)
12. "Lean Jean" (Stella Lee, Johnny Grande, Ralph Jones, Rudy Pompilli)

== Personnel ==
- Bill Haley – rhythm guitar, vocals on all but 8
- Franny Beecher – lead guitar
- Billy Williamson – steel guitar, vocal on 8
- Johnny Grande – piano
- Al Rex – bass guitar
- Ralph Jones – drums
- Rudy Pompilli – tenor saxophone, clarinet on 2
