= Rockin' the Joint (Bill Haley & His Comets album) =

Compilation album by Bill Haley and His Comets
- Released: August 11, 1958
- Recorded: Various dates 1955–1957; New York
- Genre: Rock and roll
- Label: Decca
- Producer: Milt Gabler

Bill Haley and His Comets chronology
Rockin' Around the World (1958)	Rockin' the Joint (1958)	Bill Haley's Chicks (1959)

Rockin' the Joint is a compilation album of rock and roll music by Bill Haley & His Comets. Released on Decca Records in August 1958, it was the group's seventh album. The album consisted of recordings that, for the most part, had only been released previously as singles or on EPs; all of the recordings were produced by Milt Gabler. The title comes from the album's lead track, a 1957 re-recording of Haley's 1952 hit, "Rock the Joint", which was labelled "New Rock the Joint" on this release. Also included for the first time on album were the hits "See You Later Alligator", "Rip it Up", and "The Saints Rock and Roll". One track, "The Beak Speaks", was an instrumental featuring guitarist Franny Beecher, while "Rock Lomond" (based on the Scottish air "Loch Lomond") was a leftover from the recording sessions for the band's previous album, Rockin' the Oldies and is the only track on the album that had not previously been released. The only track copied from a previous Haley album is "Burn That Candle", which was also included on the Rock Around the Clock compilation.

== Track listing ==
1. "New Rock the Joint" (Harry Crafton, Wendell Keene, Harry Bagby)
2. "Move It On Over" (Hank Williams)
3. "How Many?" (Hal Barnes, Howard Blair)
4. "See You Later, Alligator" (Robert Guidry)
5. "The Beak Speaks" (Franny Beecher, Billy Williamson)
6. "Forty Cups of Coffee" (Danny Overbea)
7. "The Saints' Rock and Roll" (Traditional, arranged and adapted by Bill Haley, Milt Gabler)
8. "Sway with Me" (Bill Haley, Milt Gabler, Rusty Keefer, Catherine Cafra)
9. "It's a Sin" (Fred Rose, Zeb Turner)
10. "Burn That Candle" (Winfield Scott)
11. "Rock Lomond" (Traditional, arranged by Susan Heather)
12. "Rip it Up" (John Marascalco, Robert Blackwell)

== Personnel ==
- Bill Haley – rhythm guitar, vocals on all but 5
- Franny Beecher – lead guitar; vocalization on 4, 12
- Billy Williamson – steel guitar on 5
- Johnny Grande – piano
- Al Rex – double bass; bass guitar on 8
- Ralph Jones – drums on all but 7, 10
- Rudy Pompilli – tenor saxophone on all but 5, 11
- Cliff Leeman – drums on 7, 10
- Frankie Scott – tenor saxophone on 5, 11
- Joe Olivier – guitar on 9
