= Rock 'n Roll Stage Show =

Studio album by Bill Haley and His Comets
- Released: August 13, 1956
- Recorded: March 1956, New York
- Genre: Rock and roll
- Label: Decca
- Producer: Milt Gabler

Bill Haley and His Comets chronology
Rock Around the Clock (1955)	Rock 'n Roll Stage Show (1956)	Rockin' the Oldies (1957)

Rock 'n Roll Stage Show is the first studio album and fourth overall album by rock and roll band Bill Haley and His Comets. Released by Decca Records in August 1956, it was the group's first album to include new, as opposed to previously released material. Although the album spawned several singles, it also featured several album-only tracks.

Of the released singles, "Rudy's Rock" reached No. 34 on Billboard and No. 38 on Cashbox, "Hot Dog Buddy Buddy" reached No. 36 on Cashbox, and "Rockin Thru the Rye" reached No. 39 on Cashbox

The album was number one for one week in the UK on Brunswick Records on the official Record Retailers (RR) chart in 1956.

== Content ==
Rock 'n Roll Stage Show moved away from focusing solely on Bill Haley as the main singer, and included several instrumental recordings, including "Rudy's Rock" featuring tenor saxophone player Rudy Pompilli, which was featured (in a different performance) in the motion picture Rock Around the Clock earlier in the year. Also given the spotlight is guitarist Franny Beecher on "Goofin' Around" and "Blue Comet Blues", accordion player Johnny Grande on "A Rockin' Little Tune", and steel guitar player Billy Williamson sings a solo vocal on a version of Big Joe Turner's "Hide and Seek". In addition, two songs - "Tonight's the Night" and "Hey Then, There Now" were trio vocals featuring Williamson, Beecher and bass player Al Rex. Haley himself is heard on only four tracks: "Rockin' Thru the Rye" (a rock and roll version of Robert Burns' poem, "Comin' Thro' the Rye"), "Hook, Line and Sinker", "Hot Dog Buddy Buddy", and "Choo Choo Ch'Boogie", a song co-written by the album's producer, Milt Gabler, who had success with it when he produced Louis Jordan a decade earlier.

The album is also significant in that all but two of its tracks were original songs written by Haley and/or members of the Comets.

Several songs from this album were performed or heard in the band's film, Don't Knock the Rock: "Calling All Comets", "Hook, Line and Sinker", "Hot Dog Buddy Buddy", and an alternate take of "Goofin' Around."

The album was reissued in the 1980s by Charly Records, but due to a mastering error, "Hook, Line and Sinker" contains noticeable sound distortion in that version.

This album should not be confused with Rock 'n' Roll Show, a live recording of Bill Haley & His Comets from April 1955 that was released in 1997 by Hydra Records.

== Track listing ==
1. "Calling All Comets" (Bill Haley, Milt Gabler, Rudy Pompilli)
2. "Rockin' Thru the Rye" (Bill Haley, Milt Gabler, Rusty Keefer, Catherine Cafra)
3. "A Rockin' Little Tune" (Johnny Grande, Billy Williamson)
4. "Hide and Seek" (Paul Winley, Ethel Byrd)
5. "Hey Then, There Now" (Rudy Pompilli, Ralph Jones)
6. "Goofin' Around" (Franny Beecher, Johnny Grande)
7. "Hook, Line and Sinker" (Bill Haley, Edward A. Khoury, Ronnie Bonner)
8. "Rudy's Rock" (Bill Haley, Rudy Pompilli)
9. "Choo Choo Ch'Boogie" (Milt Gabler, Denver Darling, Vaughn Horton)
10. "Blue Comet Blues" (Franny Beecher, Al Rex)
11. "Hot Dog Buddy Buddy" (Bill Haley)
12. "Tonight's the Night" (Bill Haley, Catherine Cafra)

== Personnel ==
- Bill Haley – rhythm guitar, vocals on 2 7 9 11
- Franny Beecher – lead guitar, vocal on 5 12
- Billy Williamson – steel guitar, vocal on 4 5 12
- Johnny Grande – piano, accordion on 3
- Al Rex – double bass, vocal on 5 12
- Ralph Jones – drums
- Rudy Pompilli – tenor saxophone

== Chart positions ==
Chart (1956)	Peak position
UK Albums Chart	1
