= Strictly Instrumental (Bill Haley & His Comets album) =

Studio album by Bill Haley and His Comets
- Released: December 14, 1959
- Recorded: June 3, 1958; January 7, April 27 and September 17–24, 1959, New York
- Genre: Rock and roll
- Label: Decca
- Producer: Milt Gabler

Bill Haley and His Comets chronology
Bill Haley's Chicks (1959)	Strictly Instrumental (1959)	Bill Haley and His Comets (1960)

Recorded over the span of more than 18 months, Strictly Instrumental was the ninth rock and roll album by Bill Haley & His Comets, and their final album of new material for Decca Records (although Decca would release previously unissued recordings during the 1960s). Produced by Milt Gabler (the last full album he would produce for Haley), the album collects instrumental recordings made by Haley and the Comets between June 1958 and their final Decca recording sessions in September 1959. (The band subsequently began recording for Warner Bros. Records in January 1960.)

As the title of the album suggests, all of the songs on this album were instrumentals, with the exception of some ensemble singing on the track "Chiquita Linda". Bill Haley's involvement in the recordings was a matter of conjecture until research for the Bear Family Records box set The Decca Years and More in the early 1990s confirmed his presence. Recording session information compiled by music historian Chris Gardner reveals that three different bass guitar players are heard on the varying tracks: Al Rex, Al Pompilli and Al Rappa.

The album contains the Franny Beecher and Billy Williamson composition "The Catwalk", "Shaky", also composed by Franny Beecher and Billy Williamson, and "Two Shadows", composed by pianist Johnny Grande and Billy Williamson.

The album contained two chart hits: "Joey's Song", which made the charts in 1959, reaching no.35 on Cashbox, no.46 on Billboard, no.26 on the Canadian charts, and which was no.1 for 8 weeks on the Australian charts (December 12, 1959 – January 30, 1960) based on the Kent Music Report, and "Skokiaan", which became one of the band's last new Decca North American charting recordings when it was released as a single in 1960. The Warner Brothers release "Tamiami" would reach no. 79 on Cashbox on March 12, 1960. "Joey's Song" was no.2 on the year-end Top 25 Singles of 1959 list in Australia based on the Kent Music Report. "Shaky", written by Franny Beecher and Billy Williamson, was also released as a single from the album by Decca in 1959. This album also featured Haley's last recordings to be produced by Milt Gabler, with the exception of a single ("The Green Door"/"Yeah, She's Evil!") recorded for Decca in 1964.

== Legacy ==
Milt Gabler saw Strictly Instrumental, Haley's final album with Decca, as a new direction for the star: "It would be what you would call a Billy Vaughn sound today. That sound had become very popular with older buyers and Bill wasn't keeping up with what was happening with rock groups." Goldmine journalist Colin Escott considers it ironic that Haley's final two hits – "Joey's Song" and "Skokiaan" ("a revival of the Bulawayo Sweet Rhythm Band's unlikely hit from 1954"), were instrumentals – despite both of them providing the impetus for the LP.

== Track listing ==
1. "Joey's Song" (Joe Reisman)
2. "Music! Music! Music!" (Bernie Baum, Stephen Weiss)
3. "Mack the Knife" (Kurt Weill, Bertolt Brecht, Marc Blitzstein)
4. "In a Little Spanish Town" (Mabel Wayne, Sam M. Lewis, Joe Young)
5. "Two Shadows" (Johnny Grande, Billy Williamson)
6. "Shaky" (Franny Beecher, Billy Williamson)
7. "Strictly Instrumental" (Bennie Benjamin, Edgar Battle, Sol Marcus, Eddie Seiler)
8. "Skokiaan" (Tom Glazer, August Msarurgwa)
9. "Puerto Rican Peddler" (Johnny Brandon)
10. "Drowsy Waters" (Jack Ailau)
11. "Chiquita Linda" (Un Poquito de tu Amor) (Julio Gutierrez)
12. "The Catwalk" (Franny Beecher, Billy Williamson)

== Personnel ==
- Bill Haley – rhythm guitar
- Franny Beecher – lead guitar
- Billy Williamson – steel guitar
- Johnny Grande – piano
- Ralph Jones – drums
- Rudy Pompilli – tenor saxophone
- Al Rex – bass guitar on 1, 11
- Al Pompilli – bass guitar on 6, 12
- Al Rappa – bass guitar on all others

== Singles ==
1959

- Shaky/Caldonia (Decca 30926)
- Joey's Song/Ooh! Look-a-There, Ain't She Pretty? (Decca 30956)

1960

- Skokiaan (South African Song) /Puerto Rican Peddler (Decca 31030)
- Music! Music! Music!/Strictly Instrumental (Decca 31080)
