= Rockin' Around the World =

Studio album by Bill Haley and His Comets
- Released: March 17, 1958
- Recorded: November 8–21, 1957, New York
- Genre: Rock and roll
- Label: Decca, Decca 8692
- Producer: Milt Gabler

Bill Haley and His Comets chronology
Rockin' the Oldies (1957)	Rockin' Around the World (1958)	Rockin' the Joint (1958)

Rockin' Around the World was the sixth album of rock and roll music by Bill Haley and His Comets. Released in March 1958 on the Decca Records label, Decca 8692, the album was produced by Milt Gabler, who produced all of Haley's recordings for Decca. It was the second of three "themed" albums that Haley produced for the label. This album featured versions of well-known folk songs from around the world, rearranged in rock and roll style, including new lyrics, by Haley and his songwriting partners, Milt Gabler, Rusty Keefer, and Catherine Cafra. It is not known how much, if any, input Haley himself had into the writing process.

Examples of the new arrangements include "Come Rock with Me," based upon the melody of "’O sole mio", which was later again adapted by Elvis Presley as "It's Now or Never", and "Piccadilly Rock," which was based upon the melody of "London Bridge is Falling Down". Most of the melodies were in the public domain, with the exception of "Rockin' Matilda," based upon "Waltzing Matilda", which was still in copyright and thus credited to its original writers. Haley's steel guitar player, Billy Williamson, performs lead vocals on one track, "Jamaica D.J."

No hit singles resulted from this album, although Haley later re-recorded one track, "Vive le Rock and Roll", which incorporated the melody of "Frère Jacques", in a duet with Caterina Valente for the 1959 German movie Hier bin ich - hier bleib' ich (Here I Am, Here I Stay) released by Central Cinema Company Film (CCC).

== Track listing ==
All songs written by Bill Haley, Milt Gabler, Rusty Keefer and Catherine Cafra except where noted.

1. "Pretty Alouette" (traditional)
2. "Piccadilly Rock"
3. "Rockin' Rollin' Schnitzelbank" (traditional)
4. "Vive le Rock and Roll" (new lyrics incorporating Frère Jacques, French traditional)
5. "Come Rock with Me" (arranged with new lyrics by Bill Haley, Milt Gabler, Rusty Keefer, and Catherine Cafra)
6. "Wooden Shoe Rock"
7. "Me Rock-a-Hula"
8. "Oriental Rock"
9. "Rockin' Matilda" (Andrew Banjo Paterson, Marie Cowan)
10. "El Rocko"
11. "Rockin' Rita"
12. "Jamaica, D.J."

== Personnel ==
- Bill Haley – rhythm guitar, vocals on all but 6
- Franny Beecher – lead guitar
- Billy Williamson – steel guitar, vocals on 6
- Johnny Grande – piano
- Al Rex – double bass
- Ralph Jones – drums
- Rudy Pompilli – tenor saxophone
- Joe Olivier – second guitar
