= Rudy's Rock =

1956 Decca 78, 30085A.

1956 UK sheet music cover, Chappell & Co., London.

"Rudy's Rock" is a 1956 instrumental composed by Bill Haley and Rudy Pompilli and released as a Decca single. The song appeared in the 1956 Columbia Pictures movie Rock Around the Clock. The single peaked at #34 on Billboard and #26 in the UK on the Record Retailers chart.

== Background ==
The saxophone solo was by Rudy Pompilli, who played tenor saxophone in the band. The instrumental consisted of an extended saxophone solo by Pompilli with a drumming interlude performed by Ralph Jones.

"Rudy's Rock" was released as a Decca 78, 30085A, backed with "Blue Comet Blues" in 1956. The single reached number 34 on Billboard and number 38 on Cash Box. In the UK, the single reached number 30 in November, 1956 and re-charted at number 26 in December, 1956. "Rudy's Rock" appeared on the Decca album Rock and Roll Stage Show in 1956.

The Comets performed "Rudy's Rock" in the 1956 film Rock Around the Clock. Unlike other songs in the movie, "Rudy's Rock" was performed live on camera, and this version was not released on CD until the late 1990s. In live performance, the song was augmented by acrobatic slap-bass playing (in the original recording and film by Al Rex).

The song was performed on The Ed Sullivan Show on Sunday, April 28, 1957 when Bill Haley and the Comets made their second appearance on the show. They also performed the song on October 20, 1958 in Brussels, Belgium at the Royal Flemish Theatre (KVS) and in Lima, Peru, in 1961, with Al Dean on saxophone in a radio broadcast version (during a brief period when Pompilli had left the band).

It was a major part of Haley's stage show for the rest of his career. Live versions of the song appeared on the live albums Bill Haley's Scrapbook (recorded in New York City in December 1969 for Kama Sutra/Buddah Records) and Live in London '74 (recorded in London, England in March 1974 for Antic Records). In addition, near the end of his life Pompilli recorded an updated studio version of the song in 1975 for the Sonet Records album Rudy's Rock: The Sax That Changed the World, which was credited to Rudy Pompilli and the Comets. After Pompilli's death in 1976, Haley and the Comets continued to perform the song in his memory, such as a 1976 appearance on Austrian television on the show Spotlight hosted by Peter Rapp in which Pompilli's sax part was played by replacement player George Baker.

The 1956 recording appeared on the 1972 MCA career retrospective compilation album Golden Hits and the 1985 From the Original Master Tapes CD album.

== Other versions ==
"Rudy's Rock" has been performed live in concert by Bill Haley's New Comets featuring Bill Turner on their 2011 European Tour.

In 1970, Bill Haley and the Comets performed the song live on the PBS musical variety series The Show.

== Personnel (original 1956 recording) ==
- Rudy Pompilli - tenor saxophone
- Bill Haley – rhythm guitar
- Franny Beecher – lead guitar
- Billy Williamson – steel guitar
- Johnny Grande – piano
- Al Rex – bass
- Ralph Jones – drums

== Sources ==
- Jim Dawson, Rock Around the Clock: The Record That Started the Rock Revolution! (Backbeat Books, 2005).
- John W. Haley and John von Hoëlle, Sound and Glory (Wilmington, DE: Dyne-American, 1990)
- John Swenson, Bill Haley (London: W.H. Allen, 1982)
