= Rockin' the Oldies =

Studio album by Bill Haley and His Comets
- Released: August 12, 1957
- Recorded: March 22 – April 3, 1957; New York
- Genre: Rock and roll
- Label: Decca
- Producer: Milt Gabler

Bill Haley and His Comets chronology
Rock 'n' Roll Stage Show (1956)	Rockin' the Oldies (1957)	Rockin' Around the World (1958)

Professional ratings
Review scores
Source	Rating
New Record Mirror	3/5 stars

Rockin' the Oldies was the fifth album of rock and roll music by Bill Haley and His Comets. Produced by Milt Gabler, the album was released by Decca Records in 1957. It was the first of three "themed albums" that Haley recorded for Decca. On this occasion the album consisted of re-recordings of popular standards, some dating back 30 years or more, but rearranged in a rock and roll style. For example, Haley's version of Larry Clinton's "The Dipsy Doodle" included new lyrics referring to Haley's past hits, "Shake, Rattle and Roll" and "See You Later Alligator". The album did not produce any hit singles.

The recording sessions that produced this album are notable for not including Haley's usual saxophone player, Rudy Pompilli. Sidelined by illness, his place was taken by Frankie Scott. One song originally recorded for this album, "Rock Lomond" was held over until the later compilation release Rockin' the Joint.

== Track listing ==
1. "The Dipsy Doodle" (Larry Clinton)
2. "You Can't Stop Me from Dreaming" (Cliff Friend, Dave Franklin)
3. "Apple Blossom Time" (Albert Von Tilzer, Neville Fleeson)
4. "Moon Over Miami" (Joe Burke, Edgar Leslie)
5. "Is It True What They Say About Dixie?"
6. "Carolina in the Morning" (Walter Donaldson, Gus Kahn)
7. "Miss You" (Charles Tobias, Henry Tobias, Harry Tobias)
8. "Please Don't Talk About Me When I'm Gone" (Sam H. Stept, Sidney Clare)
9. "Ain't Misbehavin'" (Harry Brooks, Fats Waller, Andy Razaf)
10. "One Sweet Letter from You" (Harry Warren, Lew Brown, Sidney Clare)
11. "I'm Gonna Sit Right Down and Write Myself a Letter" (Joe Young, Fred E. Ahlert)
12. "Somebody Else Is Taking My Place" (Dick Howard, Bob Ellsworth, Russ Morgan)

== Personnel ==
- Bill Haley – rhythm guitar, vocals
- Franny Beecher – lead guitar
- Billy Williamson – steel guitar
- Johnny Grande – piano
- Al Rex – double bass
- Ralph Jones – drums
- Frankie Scott – tenor saxophone
