= Hot Dog Buddy Buddy =

Single by Bill Haley and His Comets

from the album Rock 'n' Roll Stage Show
- Released: 1956
- Recorded: 1956
- Genre: Rock and roll
- Length: 2:34
- Label: Decca Records
- Songwriter: Bill Haley
- Producer: Milt Gabler

"Hot Dog Buddy Buddy" is a 1956 rock and roll song composed by Bill Haley and released as a Decca single and also on Brunswick. The song appeared in the 1956 Columbia Pictures movie Don't Knock the Rock. The single peaked at #36 on the Cash Box pop singles chart.

== Background ==
1956 sheet music cover, Valley Brook, Chester, PA.

"Hot Dog Buddy Buddy" was written by Bill Haley and published by Valley Brook Publications, Inc., Chester, Pennsylvania and by Chappell and Company, Ltd., in the UK.

The song was recorded at the Pythian Temple studios in New York City on March 30, 1956.

The song was released as a Decca 45 single on June 4, 1956, as 9–29948, backed with "Rockin' Through the Rye". The single reached number 36 on the Cash Box pop singles chart and number 60 on Billboard. The song was also released as a 45 single in Australia on Festival Records as SP45-1034, in Belgium, on Omega as 61.060 as a 78, in South Africa, on Decca as FM1415, and in Japan, as a blue label Decca 45, D45-474.

The Comets performed "Hot Dog Buddy Buddy" in the 1956 film Don't Knock the Rock. The song was also performed on the NBC TV show Atlantic City Holiday in 1956.

The song was performed live for an Alan Freed show in 1956.

The song also appeared in the 1958 German film, Hier bin ich, heir bleib ich, or Here I Am, Here I Stay in English, starring Caterina Valente.

The recording was also released as a 78 single in the UK on Brunswick Records as 05582.

The song appeared on the 1956 Decca Records LP, Rock 'n' Roll Stage Show.

The recording was on the 1985 MCA compilation album, From the Original Master Tapes.

== Personnel (original 1956 recording) ==
- Rudy Pompilli - tenor saxophone
- Bill Haley – rhythm guitar
- Franny Beecher – lead guitar
- Billy Williamson – steel guitar
- Johnny Grande – piano
- Al Rex – bass
- Ralph Jones – drums

== Other versions ==
The song has been recorded or performed by Adriano Celentano, The Belew Twins, Phil Haley and His Comments, Franny and The Fireballs, Gina Haley live on the 2011 tour, The Speedos, Eddie Martin and the Rhythm Cruisers, Pete Anderson & The Archives, Bernie Woods and the Forest Fires on the album, Rock, Roll & Stroll, and Ruby & The Mystery Cats in 2020.

Ian Dury quoted from the song in his own recording "Bill Haley's Last Words" from the 1992 album, The Bus Driver's Prayer & Other Stories.

== Sources ==
- Dawson, Jim. Rock Around the Clock : The Record that Started the Rock Revolution (Backbeat Books, 2005. ISBN 0-87930-829-X
- John W. Haley and John von Hoëlle, Sound and Glory (Wilmington, DE: Dyne-American, 1990)
- John Swenson, Bill Haley (London: W.H. Allen, 1982)
