= Alan Dale (singer) =

American singer (1925–2002)

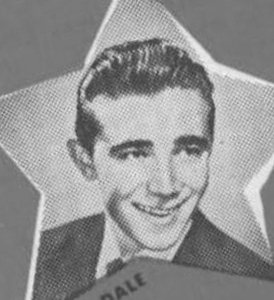

Background information
- Born: Aldo Sigismondi; July 9, 1925; Brooklyn, New York, U.S.
- Origin: New York City, U.S.
- Died: April 20, 2002 (aged 76) New York City
- Genres: Traditional pop, rock and roll
- Occupation: Singer
- Instrument: Vocals
- Years active: 1943–2002
- Labels: Signature, Columbia, Decca, Coral, ABC, MGM, United Artists
- Website: http://frasuer.tripod.com/index.html

Alan Dale (born Aldo Sigismondi; July 9, 1925 – April 20, 2002) was an American singer of traditional popular and rock and roll music.

== Early life ==
Aldo Sigismondi was born in Brooklyn, New York. His father, Aristide Sigismondi, immigrated to the United States from Abruzzi, Italy, in 1904 at the age of 21, and became a comedian in Italian language theater, with a radio program of his own. His mother, Agata "Kate" Sigismondi, was born in Messina, Sicily, and was 15 years younger than Aristide.

At the age of nine, Aldo got his first chance to perform publicly when his father was running short on his program and called on Aldo to sing. Though Aldo fainted immediately upon completing his song, he was good enough that he became a regular on his father's program.

Dale's intention was originally not to be a singer, but to go into journalism. However, he quit school after an argument with a teacher and ended up going from one job to another, until one day in 1943 he and a friend passed by a casino in Coney Island and the friend suggested he try out for a singing job. He was told to come back in the evening, and when he came back prepared to sing two songs, was called back for seven encores. He was immediately hired. In 1944, he joined the Carmen Cavallaro Orchestra as featured vocalist, and at Cavallaro's insistence got a new name. The name was taken from Alan-a-Dale. In 1944 and 1945, Dale sang for George Paxton's Orchestra and became increasingly popular on the East Coast performing at the Roseland Ballroom in New York and recording for Majestic Records.

== Musical career ==
In 1947 he was encouraged by Bob Thiele, a record producer, to sign up as a solo artist with Signature Records. He premiered as a soloist on Columbia Records in a December 1947 film short featuring the Elliot Lawrence Orchestra. The next year he got his own television show, The Alan Dale Show, on the DuMont Television Network. In 1950, it went to CBS.

In the early 1950s, he shuttled around from one record label to another, going from Columbia to Decca before settling with Coral, the label on which he had his major hits: "(The Gang that Sang) Heart of My Heart" (together with Johnny Desmond and Don Cornell), which reached No. 10 on Billboard in 1953, a vocal version of "Cherry Pink and Apple Blossom White" which reached No. 14 in 1955, and "Sweet and Gentle", which also charted in 1955, at No. 10.. The last two recordings sold over one million copies each, and were awarded gold discs.

Also in 1955, the singles "I'm Sincere" (the flip side of "Cherry Pink") and "Rockin The Cha-Cha" reached the Music Vendor top 40.

He became a friend of Alan Freed, and as a result got a chance to play a role as a rock and roll singer in the 1956 film, Don't Knock the Rock. In this movie, he played alongside Freed, Bill Haley & His Comets, Little Richard, and The Treniers. He sang the title song, which he also recorded as a single. He also sang "I Cry More," the first song written by Burt Bacharach and Hal David to be featured in a motion picture.

In 1957 he resumed his shuttling from one record label to another, going to ABC, MGM, and United Artists. In 1958, while in a nightclub in New York, Dale was attacked, suffering cuts and a serious hand injury when he crashed into a plate glass window after having fallen down a set of stairs. Dale recovered from his injuries, but the assailant who knocked him down the stairs was never identified.

Dale recorded Chuck Berry's Back in the USA. It was released on Colombia Records 45-DO-4086 in 1959, as a single, along with a version of Bo Didley's ' Crackin' Up '.

== Career decline and death ==
At the end of the 1950s, Dale found television hosts such as Ed Sullivan were refusing to have him on their shows, causing his career to go into decline. This was not helped by his authorship of a 1965 autobiography, The Spider and the Marionettes, in which he listed names of people who were trying to affect his career adversely, with descriptions of their activities toward this end. The book received a scathing review from Virginia Kirkus' Service, which wrote:

Ballad singer Alan Dale should have called his autobiography Struggle to Stardom—Almost. Dale has been up and down the stardust trail for about fifteen years, making it big then fading out. His flaw, as Dale sees it, is that he is too individualistic and uncompromising. Also, he insists on using all sides of his entertainer's soul, which includes some stand-up comic material his managers and others can't bear. Dale chews up managers like oyster crackers. These days he's his own manager and agent, works mainly in cafes and he has spun his private web to live on. Most everyone else in entertainment he considers neurotic marionettes. He reveals several of his love affairs and candidly admits to some acts of vengeance. The main theme of the book, though, is, Is Alan Dale Sick? He sure looks it on the page, frequently bursting into tears or rages. Rather than out of individualism, he seems to act out of compulsive immaturity. His only care is his neon ego. How can a grown man agonize over adolescent musical trash and phony cocktail songs, the mainstreams of American kitsch? Would even Sinatra die for his music, like Bessie Smith or Billie Holliday? Never once does Dale mention that his material expresses his view of life.

Despite this, Dale was able to maintain a lower-profile version of his singing career over the ensuing decades, performing at nightclubs, dinner theaters and concert appearances.

He died in New York in 2002, at the age of 76.
