= Strictly Instrumental =

Strictly Instrumental may refer to:

- Strictly Instrumental (Doc Watson, Lester Flatt and Earl Scruggs album), 1967
- Strictly Instrumental (Bill Haley & His Comets album), 1959
