= Alan Freed =

American disc jockey and rock-and-roll figure (1921–1965)

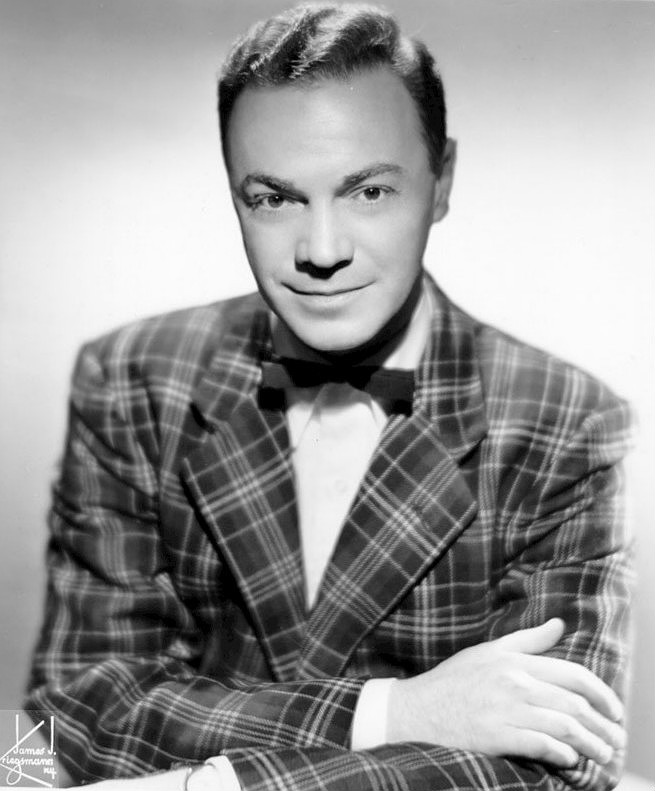
- Freed, c. 1958
- Born: Albert James Freed; December 15, 1921; Windber, Pennsylvania, U.S.
- Died: January 20, 1965 (aged 43); Palm Springs, California, U.S.
- Resting place: Lake View Cemetery, Cleveland, Ohio, U.S.
- Occupation: Disc jockey
- Years active: 1945–1965
- Spouses: Betty Lou Bean (m. 1943; div. 1949); Marjorie J. Hess (m. 1950; div. 1958); Inga Lil Boling (m. 1958)
- Children: 4

Albert James "Alan" Freed (December 15, 1921 – January 20, 1965) was an American disc jockey. He also produced and promoted large traveling concerts with various acts, helping to spread the importance of rock and roll music throughout North America, including popularizing the term "rock and roll".

In 1986, Freed was inducted into the Rock and Roll Hall of Fame. His "role in breaking down racial barriers in U.S. pop culture in the 1950s, by leading white and black kids to listen to the same music, put the radio personality 'at the vanguard' and made him 'a really important figure'", according to the executive director.

== Early years ==
Freed was born to a Welsh-American mother, Maude Palmer, and a Russian Jewish immigrant father, Charles S. Freed, in Windber, Pennsylvania. The 1930 Federal Census has the Freeds living at 550 East Seventh Street in Salem, Ohio, with Charles listing his place of birth as Alsace-Lorraine and his language Lithuanian. Freed attended Salem High School, graduating in 1940. While Freed was in high school, he formed a band called the Sultans of Swing in which he played the trombone. Freed's initial ambition was to be a bandleader; however, an ear infection put an end to that dream.

While attending Ohio State University, Freed became interested in radio. Freed served in the US Army during World War II and worked as a DJ on Armed Forces Radio. Soon after World War II, Freed landed broadcasting jobs at smaller radio stations, including WKST (New Castle, Pennsylvania); WKBN (Youngstown, Ohio); and WAKR (Akron, Ohio), where, in 1945, he became a local favorite for playing hot jazz and pop recordings.

== Career ==
Freed was the first radio disc jockey and concert producer who frequently played and promoted rock and roll; he popularized the phrase "rock and roll" on mainstream radio in the early 1950s. The term "rock and roll" already existed in the early 1940s, but it remained obscure. For example, one of the term's earliest uses was by a music critic and record reviewer for Billboard named Maurie Orodenker (1908–1993). In the May 30, 1942 issue (page 25) of Billboard, in his review of the song "Rock Me" by Thomas A. Dorsey (a song which appeared on a record released in May 1942 by Lucky Millinder and His Orchestra with Rosetta Tharpe), Orodenker described the vocals of Sister Rosetta Tharpe as "rock-and-roll spiritual singing."

Several sources suggest that he first discovered the term (as a euphemism for sexual intercourse) on the record "Sixty Minute Man" by Billy Ward and his Dominoes. The lyrics include the line, "I rock 'em, roll 'em all night long", however, Freed did not accept that inspiration (or that meaning of the expression) in interviews, and explained his view of the term as follows: "Rock 'n roll is really swing with a modern name. It began on the levees and plantations, took in folk songs, and features blues and rhythm".

He helped bridge the gap of segregation among young teenage Americans, presenting music by black artists (rather than cover versions by white artists) on his radio program, and arranging live concerts attended by racially mixed audiences. Freed appeared in several motion pictures as himself. In the 1956 film Rock, Rock, Rock, Freed tells the audience that "rock and roll is a river of music which has absorbed many streams: rhythm and blues, jazz, ragtime, cowboy songs, country songs, folk songs. All have contributed greatly to the big beat."

=== WAKR Akron ===
In June 1945, Alan Freed joined WAKR (1590 AM) in Akron, Ohio, and quickly became a star announcer. Dubbed "The Old Knucklehead", Freed had up to five hours of airtime every day on the station by June 1948: the daytime Jukebox Serenade, the early-evening Wax Works and the nightly Request Review. Freed also had brief run-ins with management and was at one point temporarily fired for violating studio rules and failing to show up for work for several days in a row.

At the height of his popularity in 1948, Freed signed a contract extension with WAKR that included a non-compete clause inserted by owner S. Bernard Berk, preventing Freed from working at any station within a radius of 75 miles (121 kilometers) of Akron for a full year. Freed left WAKR on February 12, 1950, and after one program on competing station WADC (1350 AM) several days later, Berk and WAKR sued Freed to enforce the clause. Freed repeatedly lost in court, even after appealing his case to the Supreme Court of Ohio; Berk's successful implementation of the non-compete is now recognized within the industry as a model for broadcasters regarding on-air talent contracts.

=== WJW Cleveland ===
In the late 1940s, while working at WAKR, Freed met Cleveland record store owner Leo Mintz. Record Rendezvous, one of Cleveland's largest record stores, had begun selling rhythm and blues records. Mintz told Freed that he had noticed increased interest in the records at his store, and encouraged him to play them on the radio. In 1951, having already joined television station WXEL (channel 9, now WJW channel 8) in the middle of 1950 as an announcer, Freed moved to Cleveland, which at 39 miles (63 km) from Akron was within the range of the still in force non-compete clause. However, in April, through the help of William Shipley, RCA's Northern Ohio distributor, he was released from the non-compete clause. He was then hired by WJW radio for a midnight program sponsored by Main Line, the RCA Distributor, and Record Rendezvous. Freed peppered his speech with hipster language, and, with a rhythm and blues record called "Moondog" as his theme song, broadcast R&B hits into the night.

Mintz proposed buying airtime on Cleveland radio station WJW (850 AM), which would be devoted entirely to R&B recordings, with Freed as host. On July 11, 1951, Freed began playing rhythm and blues records on WJW. While R&B records were played for many years on lower-powered, inner city radio stations aimed at African-Americans, this is arguably the first time that authentic R&B was featured regularly on a major, mass audience station. Freed called his show "The Moondog House" and billed himself as "The King of the Moondoggers". He had been inspired by an instrumental piece called "Moondog Symphony" that had been recorded by New York-based composer and street musician Louis T. Hardin, known professionally as Moondog. Freed adopted the record as his show's theme music. His on-air manner was energetic, in contrast to many contemporary radio presenters of traditional pop music, who tended to sound more subdued and low-key in manner. He addressed his listeners as if they were all part of a make-believe kingdom of hipsters, united in their love for music. He also began popularizing the phrase "rock and roll" to describe the music he played.

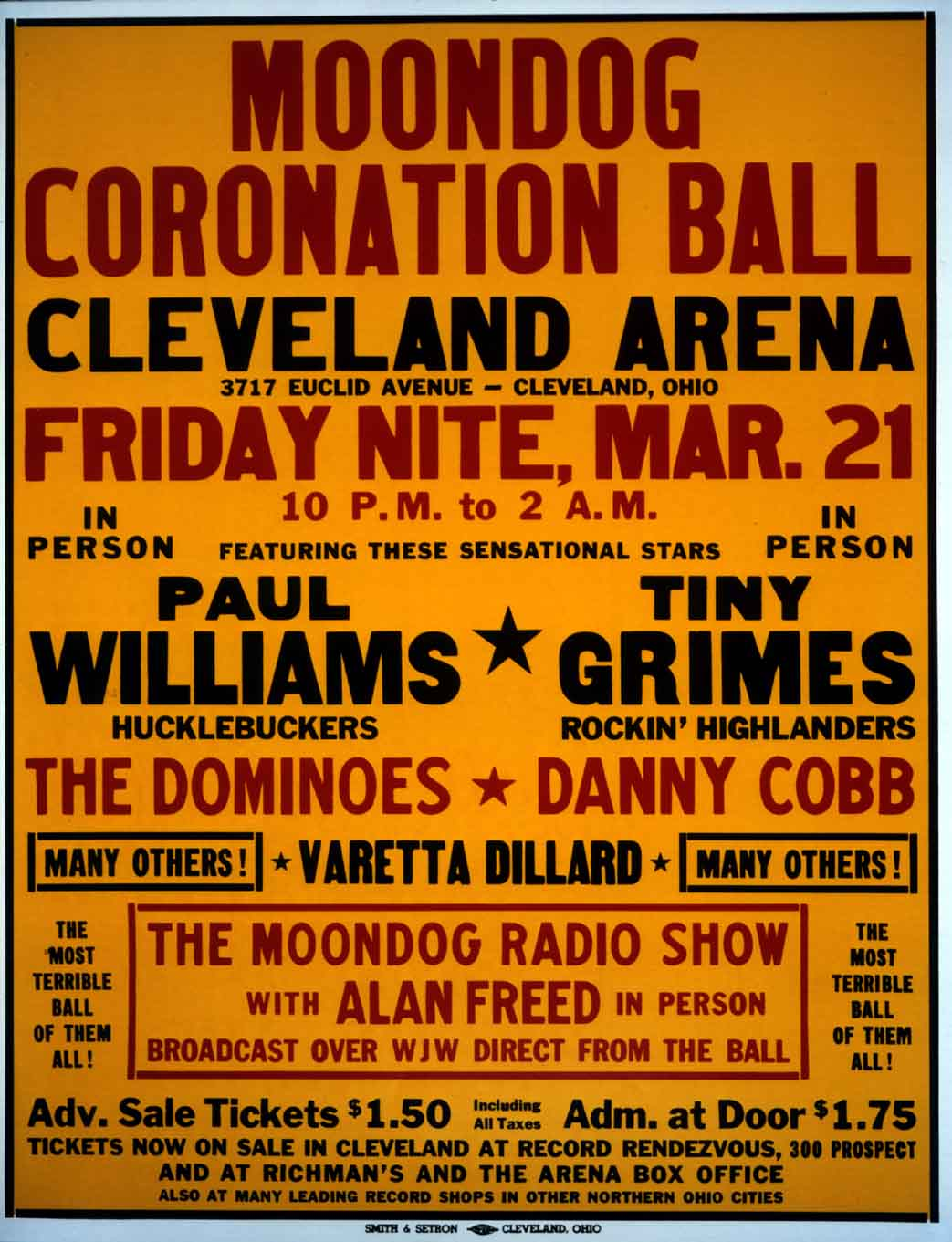
Concert poster for the Coronation Ball

Later that year, Freed promoted dances and concerts featuring the music he was playing on the radio. He was one of the organizers of a five-act show called "The Moondog Coronation Ball" on March 21, 1952, at the Cleveland Arena. This event is now considered to have been the first major rock and roll concert. Crowds attended in numbers far beyond the arena's capacity, and the concert was shut down early due to overcrowding and a near-riot. Freed gained notoriety from the incident. WJW immediately increased the airtime allotted to Freed's program, and his popularity soared.

In those days, Cleveland was considered by the music industry to be a "breakout" city, where national trends first appeared in a regional market. Freed's popularity made the pop music business take notice. Soon, tapes of Freed's program, Moondog, began to air in the New York City area over station WNJR 1430 (now WNSW), in Newark, New Jersey.

=== New York stations ===
In July 1954, following his success on the air in Cleveland, Freed moved to WINS (1010 AM) in New York City. Hardin, the original Moondog, later took a court action suit against WINS for damages against Freed for infringement in 1956, arguing prior claim to the name "Moondog", under which he had been composing since 1947. Hardin collected a $6,000 judgment from Freed, as well as an agreement to give up further usage of the name Moondog. Freed left the station in May 1958 "after a riot at a dance in Boston featuring Jerry Lee Lewis". WINS eventually became an around-the-clock Top 40 rock and roll radio station, and would remain so until April 19, 1965, long after Freed left and three months after he had died—when it became an all-news outlet.

Earlier, in 1956, Freed had hosted "The Camel Rock and Roll Dance Party", so named for the sponsor Camel cigarettes. The half hour program headlined Count Basie and his Orchestra and later Sam The Man Taylor and His Orchestra, and featured weekly rock n roll guests such as LaVern Baker, Clyde McPhatter and Frankie Lymon and the Teenagers. The radio program was also referred to as "Alan Freed's Rock 'n' Roll Dance Party" on CBS Radio from New York.

Freed also worked at WABC (AM) starting in May 1958 but was fired from that station on November 21, 1959, after refusing to sign a statement for the FCC that he had never accepted payola bribes.

He subsequently arrived at a small Los Angeles station, KDAY (1580 AM) and worked there for about one year.

=== Film and television ===
Freed also appeared in a number of pioneering rock and roll motion pictures during this period. These jukebox musicals were often welcomed with tremendous enthusiasm by teenagers because they brought visual depictions of their favorite American acts to the big screen, years before music videos would present the same sort of image on the small television screen.

Freed appeared in several motion pictures that presented many of the big musical acts of his day, including:

- 1956: Rock Around the Clock featuring Freed, Bill Haley & His Comets, the Platters, Freddie Bell and the Bellboys, Lisa Gaye.
- 1956: Rock, Rock, Rock featuring Freed, Teddy Randazzo, Tuesday Weld, Chuck Berry, Frankie Lymon and the Teenagers, Johnny Burnette, LaVern Baker, the Flamingos, the Moonglows.
- 1957: Mister Rock and Roll featuring Freed, Rocky Graziano and Teddy Randazzo, Lionel Hampton, Ferlin Husky, Frankie Lymon, Little Richard, Brook Benton, Chuck Berry, Clyde McPhatter, LaVern Baker, Screamin' Jay Hawkins.
- 1957: Don't Knock the Rock featuring Freed, Bill Haley and His Comets, Alan Dale, Little Richard and the Upsetters, the Treniers, Dave Appell and His Applejacks.
- 1959: Go, Johnny Go! featuring Freed, Jimmy Clanton, Chuck Berry, Ritchie Valens, Eddie Cochran, the Flamingos, Jackie Wilson, The Cadillacs, Sandy Stewart, Jo Ann Campbell, Harvey Fuqua and the Moonglows. Chuck Berry also played Freed's pal and sidekick, a groundbreaking role in those days.

Freed was given a weekly primetime TV series, The Big Beat, which premiered on ABC on July 12, 1957. The show was scheduled for a summer run, with the understanding that if there were enough viewers, it would continue into the 1957–58 television season. Although the ratings for the show were strong, it was suddenly terminated. The Wall Street Journal summarized the end of the program as follows. "Four episodes into The Big Beat, Freed's prime-time TV music series on ABC, an uproar was caused when African-American artist Frankie Lymon was seen on TV dancing with a white audience member". Two more episodes were aired but the show was suddenly cancelled. Some sources indicate that the cancellation was triggered by an uproar among ABC's local affiliates in the South.

During this period, Freed was seen on other popular programs of the day, including To Tell the Truth, where he is seen defending the new "rock and roll" sound to the panelists, who were all clearly more comfortable with swing music: Polly Bergen, Ralph Bellamy, Hy Gardner and Kitty Carlisle.

=== Legal trouble, payola scandal ===
In 1958, Freed faced controversy in Boston when he told the audience, "It looks like the Boston police don't want you to have a good time." As a result, Freed was arrested and charged with inciting to riot, and was fired from his job at WINS.

Freed's career was significantly affected when it was shown that he had accepted payola (payments from record companies to play specific records), a practice that was highly controversial at the time. He initially denied taking payola but later admitted to his fans that he had accepted bribes. Freed refused to sign a statement for the FCC while working at WABC (AM) to state that he never received bribes. That led to his termination.

In 1960, payola was made illegal. In December 1962, after being charged on multiple counts of commercial bribery, Freed pleaded guilty to two counts of commercial bribery and was fined three hundred dollars and given a suspended sentence.

There was also a series of conflict of interest allegations, that he had taken songwriting co-credits that he did not deserve. The most notable example was Chuck Berry's "Maybellene". Taking partial credit allowed him to receive part of a song's royalties, which he could help increase by heavily promoting the record on his own program. Berry was eventually able to regain the writing credit.

The Flamingos also alleged that Freed had wrongly taken writing credit for some of their songs. In another example, however, Harvey Fuqua of The Moonglows insisted Freed's name was not merely a credit on the song "Sincerely" and that he did actually co-write it, although other band members disagreed.

In 1964 Freed was indicted by a federal grand jury for tax evasion and ordered to pay $37,920 in taxes on income he had allegedly not reported. Most of that income was said to be from payola sources.

== Later years and death ==
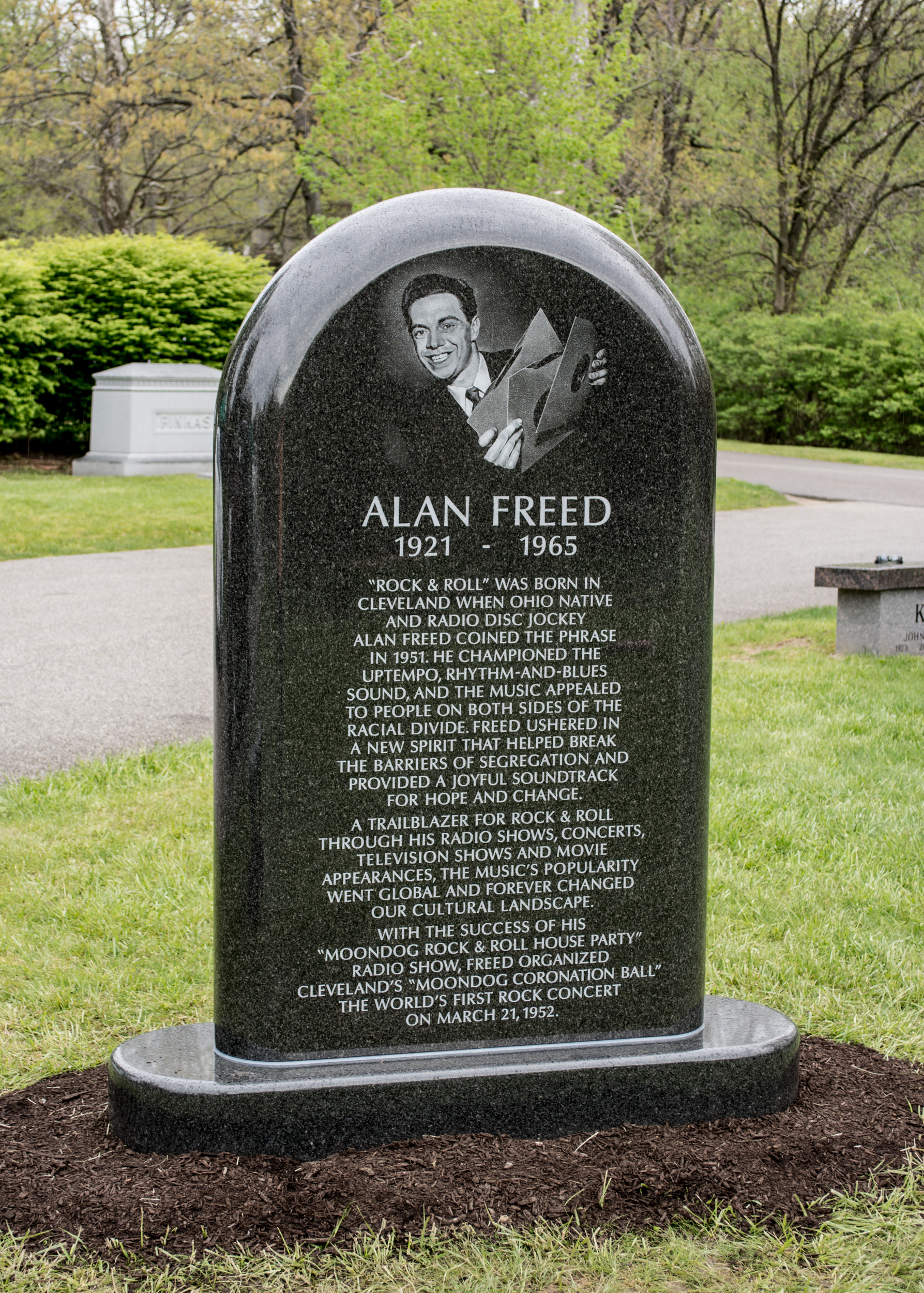
Alan Freed's gravestone at the Lake View Cemetery in Cleveland, Ohio

Because of the negative publicity from the payola scandal, no prestigious radio or television station would employ Freed, and he moved to the West Coast in 1960, where he worked at radio KDAY/1580 in Santa Monica, California. After KDAY refused to allow him to promote "rock and roll" stage shows, Freed moved to Miami, Florida in August 1962 where he worked at radio WQAM. Recognizing that his career in major markets might be over, he began to drink heavily and the job lasted only two months.

During 1964, he returned to Los Angeles where he worked for a short stint at the Long Beach radio station KNOB/97.9.

Living in the Racquet Club Estates neighborhood of Palm Springs, California, Alan Freed died on January 20, 1965 at the Desert Regional Medical Center in Palm Springs from uremia and cirrhosis brought on by alcoholism, at the age of 43, less than one week after personally checking himself into the hospital for health problems. Prior to his death, the Internal Revenue Service had continued to audit him, maintaining that he owed $38,000 for tax evasion, but Freed did not have the financial means to pay that amount.

His body was cremated and his ashes were initially interred in the Ferncliff Cemetery in Hartsdale, New York. In March 2002, Judith Fisher Freed, his daughter-in-law, carried his ashes to the Rock and Roll Hall of Fame in Cleveland, Ohio. On August 1, 2014, the Hall of Fame asked Alan Freed's son, Lance Freed, to remove the ashes permanently, which he did. The Freed family later interred his ashes at Cleveland's Lake View Cemetery beneath a jukebox-shaped memorial featuring Freed's image.

== Personal life ==
On August 22, 1943, Freed married his first wife Betty Lou Bean. They had two children, daughter Alana and son Lance, and divorced on December 2, 1949. On August 12, 1950, Freed married Marjorie J. Hess, with whom he had two children, daughter Sieglinde and son Alan Freed, Jr. They divorced on July 25, 1958. On August 8, 1958, Freed married Inga Lil Boling. They remained together until his death.

== In popular culture ==
An archived sample of Freed's introduction on the Moondog Show was used by Ian Hunter in the opening of the song "Cleveland Rocks", from Hunter's 1979 album You're Never Alone with a Schizophrenic.

The 1978 motion picture American Hot Wax was inspired by Freed's contribution to the rock and roll scene. Although director Floyd Mutrux created a fictionalized account of Freed's last days in New York radio by using real-life elements outside of their actual chronology, the film does accurately convey the fond relationship between Freed, the musicians he promoted, and the audiences who listened to them. The film starred Tim McIntire as Freed and included cameo appearances by Chuck Berry, Screamin' Jay Hawkins, Frankie Ford and Jerry Lee Lewis, performing in the recording studio and concert sequences. Freed was honored with a star on the Hollywood Walk of Fame in 1991. The organization's website posted this note: "He became internationally known for promoting African-American rhythm and blues music on the radio in the United States and Europe under the name of rock and roll".

On January 23, 1986, Freed was part of the first group inducted into the Rock and Roll Hall of Fame in Cleveland. In 1988, he was also posthumously inducted into the National Radio Hall of Fame. On December 10, 1991, Freed was given a star on the Hollywood Walk of Fame. The VH1 series Behind The Music produced an episode on Freed featuring Roger Steffens. In 1998, The Official Website of Alan Freed went online with the jumpstart from Brian Levant and Michael Ochs archives as well as a home page biography written by Ben Fong-Torres. On February 26, 2002, Freed was honored at the Grammy Awards with the Trustees Award. In 2017 he was inducted into the National Rhythm & Blues Hall of Fame in Detroit, Michigan.

Freed was used as a character in Stephen King's short story "You Know They Got a Hell of a Band", and was portrayed by Mitchell Butel in its television adaptation for the Nightmares & Dreamscapes mini-series. He was the subject of a 1999 television movie, Mr. Rock 'n' Roll: The Alan Freed Story, starring Judd Nelson and directed by Andy Wolk. The 1997 film Telling Lies in America stars Kevin Bacon as a disc jockey with a loose resemblance to Freed. Jack McBrayer portrayed Freed on the Comedy Central show Drunk History in a segment on Freed's legacy. The Cleveland Cavaliers' mascot Moondog is named in honor of Freed.

Freed is mentioned in the Ramones' song "Do You Remember Rock 'n' Roll Radio?" as one of the band's idols. Other songs that reference Freed include "The King of Rock 'n Roll" by Terry Cashman and Tommy West, "Ballrooms of Mars" by Marc Bolan, "They Used to Call it Dope" by Public Enemy, "Payola Blues" by Neil Young, "Life Is a Rock (But the Radio Rolled Me)" by Reunion, "Done Too Soon" by Neil Diamond, "The Ballad of Dick Clark" by Skip Battin, a member of the Byrds, and "This Is Not Goodbye, Just Goodnight" by Kill Your Idols.

The 2023 off-Broadway musical Rock & Roll Man follows Freed's rise and influence in radio using various songs that he played on the radio. Constantine Maroulis played Freed.

In 2024, RiffTrax produced and published a humorous commentary for the 1956 musical drama film Rock, Rock, Rock!, in which Freed appeared on as a show presenter.

== Legacy ==
Freed's importance to the musical genre is confirmed by his induction into the Rock and Roll Hall of Fame and his 1991 star on the Hollywood Walk of Fame. The DJ was also inducted into the Radio Hall of Fame in 1988. The organization's Web page states that "despite his personal tragedies, Freed's innovations helped make rock and roll and the Top-40 format permanent fixtures of radio".

The Wall Street Journal in 2015 recalled "Freed's sizable contributions to rock 'n' roll and to teenagers' more tolerant view of integration in the 1950s". The publication praised the help he gave to "hundreds of black and white artists" and said that "his tireless efforts helped create thousands of jobs for studio musicians, engineers, record producers, concert promoters and instrument manufacturers".

One source said that "No man had as much influence on the coming culture of our society in such a short period of time as Alan Freed, the real King of Rock n Roll". Another source summarized his contribution as follows:

Alan Freed has secured a place in American music history as the first important rock 'n' roll disc jockey. His ability to tap into and promote the emerging black musical styles of the 1950s to a white mainstream audience is seen as a vital step in rock's increasing dominance over American culture.

The board of directors of the National Rhythm & Blues Hall of Fame inducted Alan Freed into the class of 2017.
