= Don't Knock the Rock =

1956 film by Fred F. Sears

- Film lobby card
- Directed by: Fred F. Sears
- Written by: Robert E. Kent; James B. Gordon
- Produced by: Sam Katzman
- Starring: Alan Dale
- Cinematography: Benjamin H. Kline
- Edited by: Paul Borofsky; Edwin H. Bryant
- Distributed by: Columbia Pictures
- Release date: December 14, 1956 (United States)
- Running time: 84 minutes
- Country: United States
- Language: English
- Box office: $1.2 million (US rentals)

Don't Knock the Rock is a 1956 American musical film directed by Fred F. Sears and starring Alan Dale and Alan Freed. It was written by Robert. E. Kent and James B. Gordon. The film features performances by Bill Haley & His Comets (who were top-billed), Little Richard, The Treniers, and Dave Appell and the Applejacks.

In contrast to the title track of Haley's previous film, Rock Around the Clock, the title track of this film was specially written for it (screenwriter Robert E. Kent is credited as co-writer of the song). A Haley recording of the song is played over the opening credits, but it is Alan Dale who performs the number in the film. Indeed, while Haley and his band are the top-billed performers in the movie, the story in fact focuses on Dale's character.

== Plot ==
Arnie Haines is a rock and roll star who returns to his hometown to rest up for the summer only to find that rock and roll has been banned there by disapproving adults. Among those against him is influential newspaper columnist Arline MacLaine, though this does not stop Arnie from starting up a romance with MacLaine's daughter Francine. At Francine's urging, Arnie decides to perform a show to demonstrate to Arline that the adults' fears are unjustified. Meanwhile, MacLaine's columns have led to other towns across the country canceling planned rock and roll shows. This leaves big-name acts like Bill Haley, Little Richard, The Treniers and Dave Appell available to perform in Arnie's show.

The show goes well at first, with Arline prepared to write a new column acknowledging that the music is harmless. However, things go awry when Arnie rejects the advances of local girl Sunny Everett. In retaliation, Sunny gets drunk and gets two boys to begin a brawl. No one believes that Sunny was at fault and the resulting newspaper articles reporting that the show led to a drunken brawl among its attendees give rock and roll a worse reputation than ever.

As his final play, Arnie works with a local theater group to put on a show called "The Pageant of Art and Culture" to appeal to the adults. The show opens with depictions of paintings by Vermeer and Renoir, followed by a minuet dance performance, this show of high culture meeting with the strong approval of the adults in attendance. However, the show's next number is taken directly from those adults' own days of youth: a raucous performance of the Charleston, providing a stark contrast between the entertainment in which the adults indulged when they were young and what they are now advocating for their children.

Arline gets the point and announces that she now agrees that parents have been using rock and roll as a scapegoat for their own parental failings. Sunny's father agrees, noting that he now accepts that his daughter was at fault for the disruption at the rock and roll show. Arline offers Arnie an apology, both on the spot and in print, and the show closes with a rock and roll number, which even the adults now allow themselves to enjoy.

== Cast ==
- Alan Dale as Arnie Haines
- Alan Freed as himself
- Fay Baker as Arline MacLaine
- Patricia Hardy as Francine MacLaine
- Bill Haley as himself
- Little Richard as himself
- The Treniers as Themselves

== Bill Haley's Band Members (Comets) in the Movie ==
- Franny Beecher
- Johnny Grande
- Ralph Jones
- Rudy Pompilli
- Al Rex, and
- Bill Haley and the Comets in Don't Knock the Rock (1956) IMDB (Reference)

== Release ==
Don't Knock the Rock premiered in New York City on December 12, 1956. The film is often listed in reference books as being a 1957 release, due to its December 1956 premiere.

== Reception ==
Variety wrote: "Script by Robert E. Kent and James B. Gordon doesn't stand too close inspection but it has been wisely written so as not to get in the way of the music. ... Production by Katzman is on the skimpy side, but it's a deficiency that won't be minded by teen-age audiences since the producer wisely spent his money for such talent as Bill Haley and his Comets ... Fred F. Sears' direction keeps the plot boiling effectively between musical numbers which boast some effective teenage dancing routines staged and created by Earl Barton."

The Monthly Film Bulletin wrote: "Made by the same production team as the controversial Rock Around the Clock, the present film emulates its predecessor in every respect. The story-line is virtually non-existent, serving only to link up musical numbers. These are performed by a succession of the leading exponents of rock'n'roll, some of whom border on the surrealistic in their antics, dress and appearance."

Kine Weekly wrote: "The picture, a light-hearted defence of hot rhythm uses a neat story to put over it propaganda. Alan Dale acts adequately and croons vigorously as Arnie, Patricia Hardy pleases as Francine, Jana Lund is a thorough minx as Sunny and Fay Baker and Pierre Watkin do their stuff as Arlene and Mayor Bagley. Bill Haley and His Comets, Little Richard, the crazy coloured singer, and Dave Appell and His Applejacks fill in the gaps. In all, a spirited rock n' roll festival."

== Songs performed in the movie ==
1. "Don't Knock the Rock" – Bill Haley and His Comets (audio only over opening credits)
2. "I Cry More" – Alan Dale
3. "You're Just Right" – Alan Dale
4. "Hot Dog Buddy Buddy" – Bill Haley and His Comets
5. "Goofin' Around" – Bill Haley and His Comets
6. "Hook, Line And Sinker" – Bill Haley and His Comets (audio only)
7. "Applejack" – Dave Appell and the Applejacks
8. "Your Love Is My Love" – Alan Dale
9. "Calling All Comets" – Bill Haley and His Comets
10. "Out Of The Bushes" – The Treniers
11. "Rip It Up" – Bill Haley and His Comets
12. "Rocking On Saturday Night" – The Treniers
13. "Gonna Run" – Alan Dale
14. "Long Tall Sally" – Little Richard
15. "Tutti-Frutti" – Little Richard
16. "Country Dance" – Dave Appell and the Applejacks
17. "Don't Knock the Rock" – Alan Dale

The version of the guitar instrumental "Goofin' Around" performed in this film differs from the version released on Decca Records; it has yet to be officially issued although a film audio recording of the scene in which it was played (as opposed to the original studio recording) was released in the late 1990s by the German label Hydra Records. Due to sheet music for the songs "Applejack" and "Country Dance" being released as a tie-in with this movie but with Bill Haley's, not Dave Appell's, photo on the cover, these songs, although Haley-sounding, are often erroneously cited as Bill Haley recordings.

The version of the guitar instrumental "Goofin' Around" performed in this film differs from the version released on Decca Records; it has yet to be officially issued although a film audio recording of the scene in which it was played (as opposed to the original studio recording) was released in the late 1990s by the German label Hydra Records. Due to sheet music for the songs "Applejack" and "Country Dance" being released as a tie-in with this movie but with Bill Haley's, not Dave Appell's, photo on the cover, these songs, although Haley-sounding, are often erroneously cited as Bill Haley recordings.

Three Little Richard songs are featured: two performed by Richard himself, and the third is a cover version of his "Rip it Up" performed by Haley.

Alan Dale's song "I Cry More" was one of the first songs published by the team of Burt Bacharach and Hal David. The two were largely unknown at the time of the film, and did not have a hit together until 1958, when their song "The Story of My Life" went to number one on the Billboard country chart.

As with Rock Around the Clock, no official soundtrack album was released, though some non-American issues of Haley compilations tied in to the film. Haley's 1956 album, Rock 'n Roll Stage Show, includes four of the songs featured in the movie: "Hot Dog Buddy Buddy", "Goofin' Around", "Hook, Line and Sinker", and "Calling All Comets".

== Home media ==
Don't Knock the Rock was never released officially on VHS or laserdisc in North America. In 2006, the film was released on Region 1 DVD by Sony Pictures (current owners of the Columbia catalog) in a two-disc set with Rock Around the Clock.

== See also ==
- List of American films of 1956
