= Is It True What They Say About Dixie? =

1936 song by Irving Caesar, Sammy Lerner, and Gerald Marks

"Is It True What They Say About Dixie?" is a 1936 song written by Irving Caesar, Sammy Lerner and Gerald Marks.

The lyrics begin: "Is it true what they say about Dixie? Does the sun really shine all the time? Do the sweet magnolias blossom at everybody's door?".

The song was a #1 hit for Jimmy Dorsey and His Orchestra in May and June 1936 with Bob Eberly on vocal. Ozzie Nelson and Willie Bryant also charted with the song that year.

The song has been parodied in various versions, such as the Beau Jesters' parody questioning Lyndon Johnson.

== Other versions ==
- Erhard Bauschke Orchestra recorded Germany (Berlin?) 1937 Polydor 17246 under the title "Sag mir bloß, was ist los mit der Lilly?" with humorous verses about a pair of lovers. This record was produced and sold despite bans on playing or broadcasting music by Jewish composers under the Third Reich
- Al Jolson and The Mills Brothers – recorded December 8, 1948.
- Al Jolson – recorded May 24, 1949
- Dean Martin on Swingin' Down Yonder 1955
- Bill Haley and His Comets – Rockin' the Oldies (1957)
- Max Bygraves – for the album Max and Ted - The Hits of the Thirties (1960).
- The Beach Boys – recorded by Brian Wilson on piano and his mother Audree singing in 1968 released in 2018 for the archival release "I Can Hear Music: The 20/20 Sessions".
- Steve Goodman - included the song on his 1977 Say It In Private album and frequently performed it as part of his live set.

== Film appearances ==
- 1936 Yellowstone – sung briefly at the beginning of the campfire scene
- 1937 Ali Baba Goes to Town – played briefly during the Ali Baba campaign parade
- 1937 Stand-In – sung by an unidentified child actress called Elvira with Anne O'Neal playing harmonica
- 1938 Hold That Co-ed – in the score at the football game
- 1943 His Butler's Sister – sung by Iris Adrian and Robin Raymond
- 1949 Jolson Sings Again – performed by Larry Parks (dubbed by Al Jolson)
- 1987 Orphans
- 2016 Rules Don't Apply
