= Joey's Song =

Single by Bill Haley & His Comets

from the album Strictly Instrumental
- B-side: "Ooh! Look-a-There, Ain't She Pretty?"
- Released: 1959
- Recorded: 1959
- Genre: Rock
- Label: Decca
- Songwriter(s): Joe Reisman, Sammy Gallop

Bill Haley & His Comets singles chronology
"Lean Jean" (1958)	"Joey's Song" (1959)	"Skokiaan (South African Song)" (1960)

"Joey's Song" is a 1959 instrumental single released by Bill Haley & His Comets. It was one of the band's last successful commercial releases.

== Background ==
The record reached #46 on the Billboard Charts and #35 on Cashbox; however, the song did make #1 in Australia for 8 weeks from December 12, 1959, to January 30, 1960, based on the Kent Music Report and reached #26 on the Canadian charts in October 1959. The record was no.2 on the year-end Top 25 Singles of 1959 list in Australia based on the Kent Music Report. The band's long run of original successful commercial releases ran out in 1960, although the famous Rock Around the Clock was successfully re-released in 1964 and 1974 (Billboard #39, US). The group continued to have chart success in Mexico during the early 1960s where the single "Florida Twist" reached no. 1.

The song, written by Joe Reisman and Sammy Gallop, was included as the lead track on the band's final album release for Decca Records, Strictly Instrumental, released in December 1959. The track, featuring Franny Beecher on lead guitar and Rudy Pompilli on saxophone, also appeared on the June 1968 U.S. greatest hits compilation album Bill Haley's Greatest Hits!, 12" LP, Decca, DL 5027 (mono)/DL 75027 (stereo).

The B-side to the single "Ooh! Look-a-There, Ain't She Pretty?", was used in the film Pink Flamingos and appears on the soundtrack to the film, along with a number of other hits of the period.

== Sources ==
- Jim Dawson, Rock Around the Clock: The Record That Started the Rock Revolution! (San Francisco: Backbeat Books, 2005)
- John W. Haley and John von Hoelle, Sound and Glory (Wilmington, DE: Dyne-American, 1990)
- John Swenson, Bill Haley (London: W.H. Allen, 1982)

== See also ==
- Bill Haley & His Comets chart positions
- List of number-one singles in Australia during the 1950s
