= Schnitzelbank =

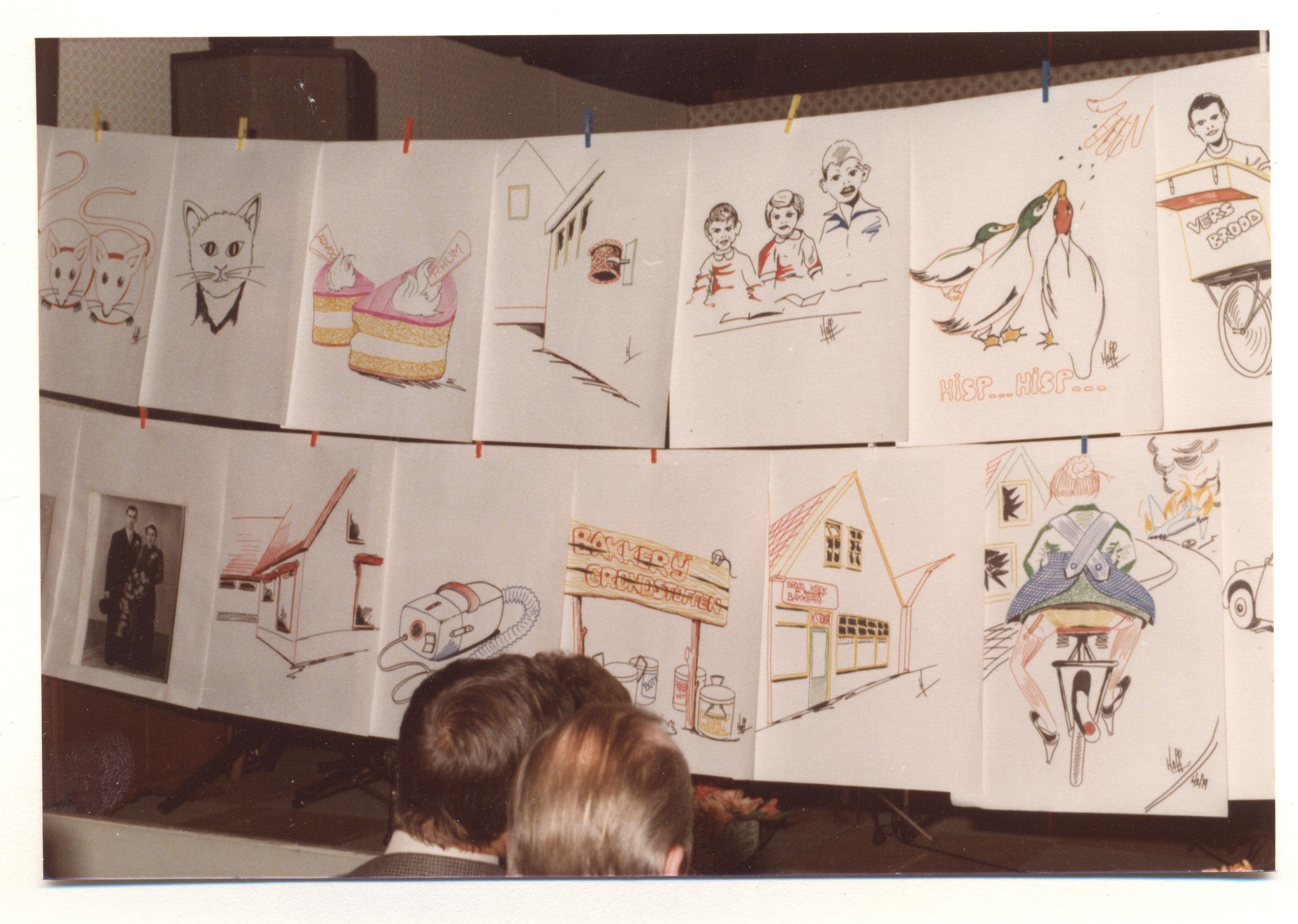

Nursery rhyme
- Published: By 1900 in U.S.
- Songwriter: Unknown

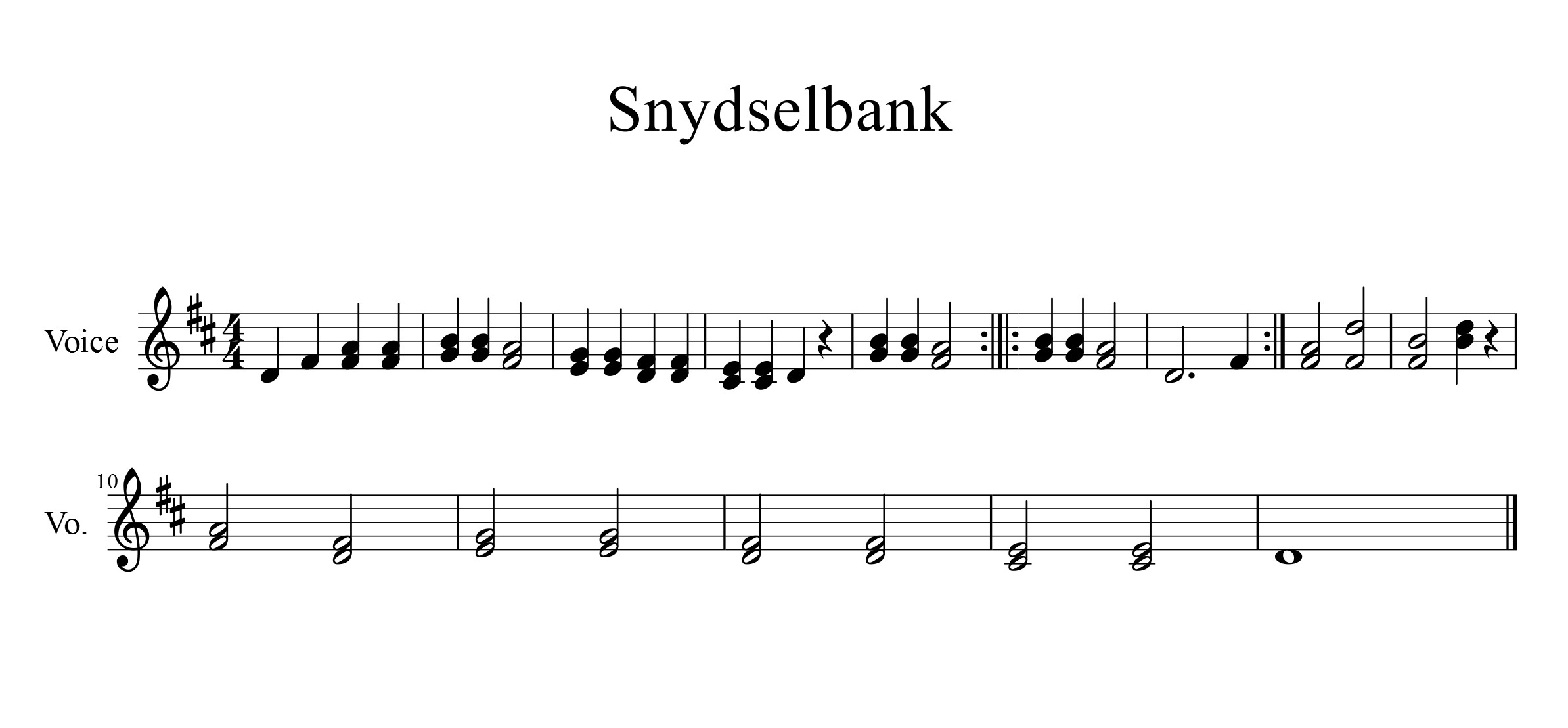
Schnitzelbanksong

The "Schnitzelbank" is a simple song, popular primarily with German Americans.

== Etymology ==
Schnitzelbank literally means "scrap bench" or "chip bench" (from Schnitzel "scraps / clips / cuttings (from carving)" or the colloquial verb schnitzeln "to make scraps" or "to carve" and Bank "bench"); like the Bank, it is feminine and takes the article "die". It is a woodworking tool used in Germany prior to the industrial revolution. It was in regular use in colonial New England, and in the Appalachian region until early in the 20th century; it is still in use by specialist artisans today. In American English, it is known as a shaving horse. It uses the mechanical advantage of a foot-operated lever to securely clamp the object to be carved. The shaving horse is used in combination with the drawknife or spokeshave to cut down green or seasoned wood, to accomplish jobs such as handling an ax; creating wooden rakes, hay forks, walking sticks, etc. The shaving horse was used by various trades, from farmer to basketmaker and wheelwright.

A Schnitzelbank is also a short rhyming verse or song with humorous content, often but not always sung with instrumental accompaniment. Each verse in a Schnitzelbank introduces a topic and ends with a comedic twist. This meaning of the word is mainly used in Switzerland and southwestern Germany; it is masculine and takes the article "der". It is a main element of the Fasnacht celebrations in the city of Basel, where it is also written Schnitzelbangg. Schnitzelbänke (pl.) are also sung at weddings and other festivities by the Schnitzelbänkler, a single person or small group. Often the Schnitzelbänkler will display posters called Helgen during some verses that depict the topic but do not give away the joke.

== Song ==
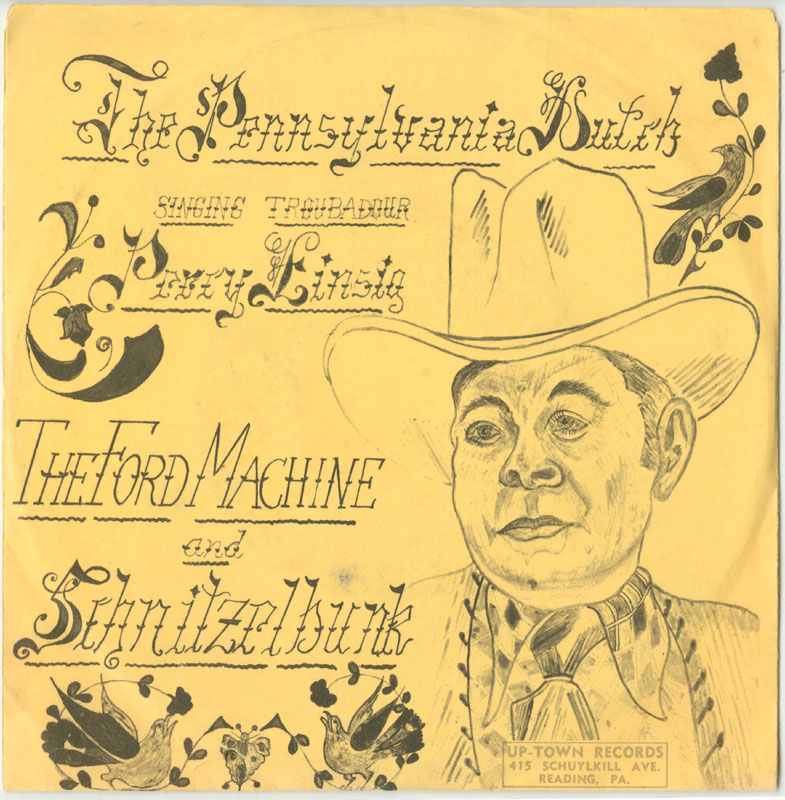
Dutch Country troubadour Percy Einsig, 45 RPM Up-Town Records

A German-language children's ditty, "The Schnitzelbank Song" is popular among German-Americans with an interest in learning German or teaching German to their children; it is often sung by adults for entertainment and nostalgia. Versions were published in the United States as early as 1900.

The responsive lyrical structure of the verse and refrain are referenced in Moritz Reymond's 1877 book Das neue Laienbrevier des Haeckelismus, which uses German folk and student songs to burlesque ideas regarding organic evolution.

Some of the lyrical ideas and phrases are also included (in a different form) in Volume 9 of Karl Simrock's 13-volume 1856 collection of German stories and poems, Die deutschen Volksbücher. In this volume, the lyrics are included in a book titled Das deutsche Kinderbuch (The German Children's Book), which may have originally been published in 1848. The text includes many ideas common to the modern song, including "kurz und lang" ("short and long"), "hin und her" ("back and forth"), "krumm und grad" ("bent and straight"), and the "ei du schöne Schnitzelbank" refrain.

== Performances ==
- Groucho Marx was performing the song in vaudeville by 1910.
- In the 1932 film Downstairs, set on a baronial estate in Austria, nefarious chauffeur Karl (John Gilbert) sings the song at dinner with butler Albert (Paul Lukas) and Albert's beautiful young wife, Anna (Virginia Bruce), trying to ingratiate himself with them.
- The Big Bad Wolf sings a version of the song to his offspring in the 1936 Walt Disney Silly Symphony cartoon Three Little Wolves.
- Cary Grant, Joan Bennett, and Gene Lockhart sing a version of the song in the film Wedding Present (1936). Joan Bennett's character uses the tune later to mock Cary Grant's character for his hypocritical behavior after being promoted.
- William Frawley performs an English version of the song in the 1942 World War II propaganda musical The Yankee Doodler.
- In Billy Wilder's 1953 film Stalag 17, American POWs sing a version of the song during a volleyball game to distract guards from spotting a contraband radio antenna.
- In 1957, Bill Haley & His Comets included a rock and roll version, "Rockin' Rollin' Schnitzelbank", on their album Rockin' Around the World.
- Danny Kaye (as Red Nichols) sings "Schnitzelbank" in the 1959 film The Five Pennies.
- Bing Crosby included the song in a medley on his album 101 Gang Songs (1961).
- In 1994, Steven Spielberg's cartoon show Animaniacs featured a segment using a version of the song, with heavily modified lyrics. In the sketch, Yakko, Wakko, and Dot travel to Germany to learn the song (referred to as the "International Friendship Song" in the show) from Professor Otto von Schnitzelpusskrankengescheitmeyer, a one-shot character voiced by Jim Cummings.
- Comedian Mel Blanc recorded a novelty Christmas song in the 1950s, "Yah Das Ist Ein Christmas Tree", which borrows the tune and concept. This was itself parodied by singer/comedian Joel Kopischke in 2005 as "Stupid Christmas Song".

== See also ==
- Cantastoria
- Mack the Knife
- Must Be Santa
