= The Treniers =

American R&B/jump blues musical group

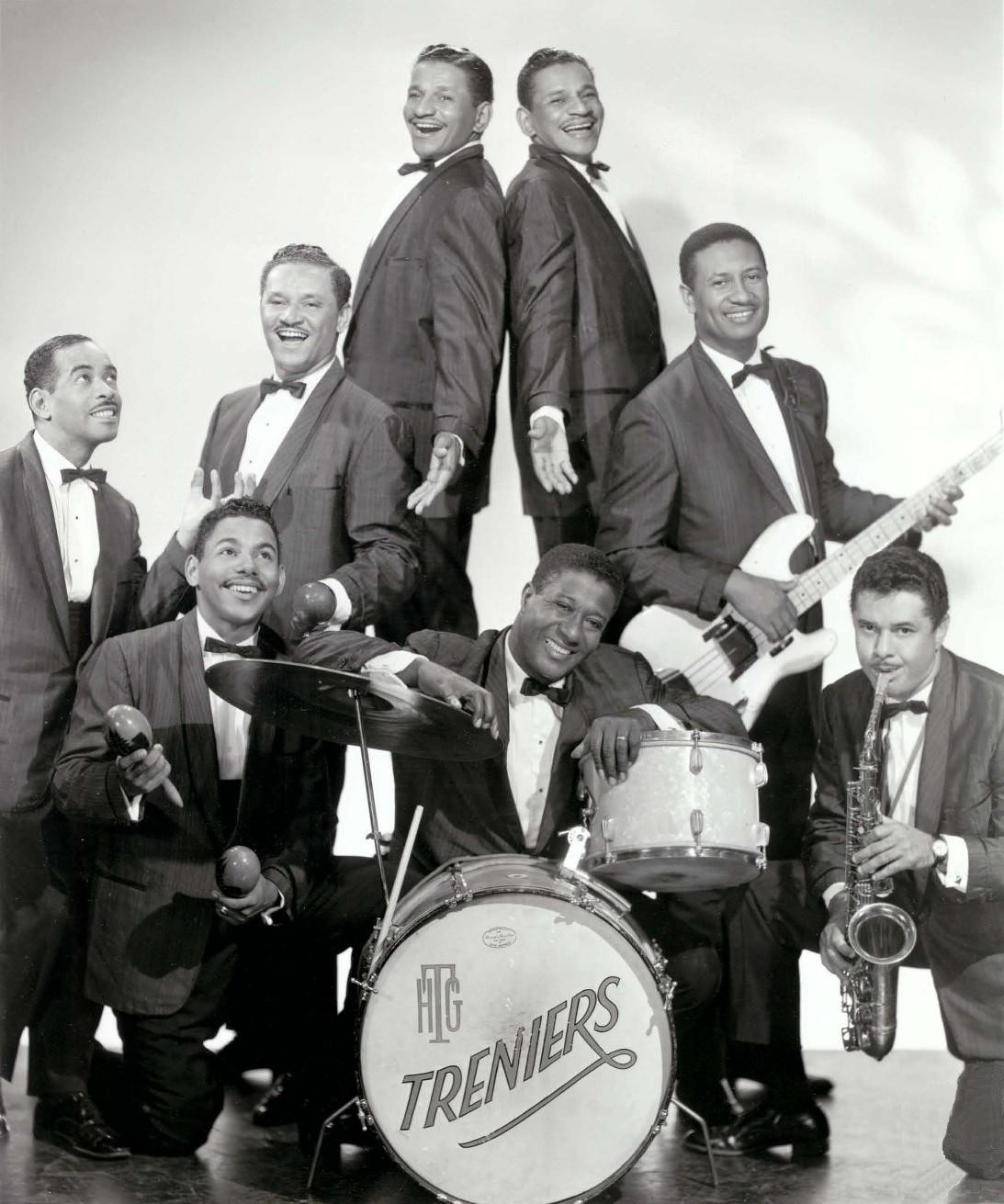
- Late 1950s Clockwise from left: Gene Gilbeaux (piano), Buddy Trenier, Cliff Trenier, Claude Trenier, Jimmy Johnson (bass), Don Hill (sax), Henry (Tucker) Green (drums), Skip Trenier

Background information
- Genres: R&B, jump blues
- Years active: 1947–2003
- Labels: Okeh, Sony, Epic, Mercury, London, Viking, Brunswick, RCA, Fontaine, Philips, Mobile

The Treniers (pronounced /trəˈniərz/) were an American R&B and jump blues musical group led by identical twins Cliff and Claude Trenier. They were originally billed as the Trenier Twins, who performed alongside the Gene Gilbeaux Quartet, but shortened their name to the Treniers when Gilbeaux and other musicians became integral members of the group. Besides the Trenier brothers, group members included Don Hill on saxophone, Shifty Henry and later James (Jimmy) Johnson on bass, Henry (Tucker) Green on drums and Gene Gilbeaux on piano. Later, additional Trenier brothers Milt and Buddy, and nephew Skip, joined the group on vocals, and there were many other musician and line-up changes over the years including Herman Washington and Mickey Baker on guitar.

== Career ==
The band was based around twins Clifton L. "Cliff" Trenier (July 14, 1919 – March 2, 1983) and Claude Oliver Trenier (July 14, 1919 – November 17, 2003). They were born in Mobile, Alabama, and formed the Alabama State Collegians when in college together in 1939. In 1943, Claude Trenier left to join Jimmie Lunceford's band as lead singer, and Cliff joined him the following year. The twins left the Lunceford band in 1947 and began performing together as the Trenier Twins, backed by the Gene Gilbeaux Quartet, which included Gene Gilbeaux on piano and Don Hill on alto saxophone. They made their first recordings for Mercury Records in 1947, and developed a strong reputation for their live performances. In 1949, they were joined by older brother Buddy Trenier (December 11, 1913 – March 15, 1999), and started to be billed as "The Rockin' Rollin' Treniers".

They played a form of music intermediate between swing and early rock and roll. Though their sound is more swing influenced, the Treniers incorporated a thumping backbeat and several songs that included the words "rock" and "roll" - "Rocking on Sunday Night" and "It Rocks! It Rolls! It Swings!", for example, and in the 1940s were already playing "Rockin' Is Our Bizness," which was inspired by Jimmie Lunceford's "Rhythm Is Our Business" from the 1930s. They were also known for the humorous content of many of their songs, and their on stage acrobatics were seen as precursors to the wild antics of many later rock and roll groups. Their lively stage presentation influenced Bill Haley and Comets, the Shadows in the UK in 1959, Paul Revere and the Raiders, and beyond.

They had their only national chart hit in 1951, when "Go! Go! Go!" reached number 10 on the Billboard R&B chart, but several of their other records including "It Rocks! It Rolls! It Swings!" (1952) and "Rockin' Is Our Bizness" (1953) "anticipated some crucial elements of rock n roll with their solid, thumping beats, their squealing sax solos." In the 1950s, they moved closer towards an R&B influenced sound, but were unable to weather the influx of rock and roll. Nonetheless, the group was considered a strong influence on bands such as their contemporaries Bill Haley and His Comets, and they were one of the first to record Haley's "Rock-a-Beatin' Boogie". Claude Trenier would later claim in an interview in Blue Suede News magazine that his group was responsible for Haley deciding to record rock and roll; this account is disputed.

One of the first times rock and roll appeared on national television was in May 1954 when the Treniers appeared on the Colgate Comedy Hour, hosted by Dean Martin and Jerry Lewis. During the playing of their songs, Martin and Lewis participated in the antics, and when the drummer got up and stepped aside, Jerry Lewis sat down and played drums for one song.

The group appeared in several films in the 1950s including The Girl Can't Help It and Don't Knock the Rock (which also featured Haley), and continued to perform as recently as 2003.

In 1955, the group released the song "Say Hey (The Willie Mays Song)" about Giants center fielder, Willie Mays, which included some dialogue by the Hall-of-Famer himself. The song is included on the soundtrack to Ken Burns 1994 documentary Baseball.

In 2013, surviving member Milt Trenier performed semi-weekly at Chicago area restaurants. Milt retired from performing in 2017, after 70 years (1947-2017).

Saxophonist Don Hill died on June 18, 2021, aged 99.

== Film appearances ==
- Don't Knock the Rock (1956)
- The Girl Can't Help It (1956)
- Calypso Heat Wave (1957)
- Juke Box Rhythm (1959)
