= Rudy Pompilli =

American rock and roll musician (1924–1976)

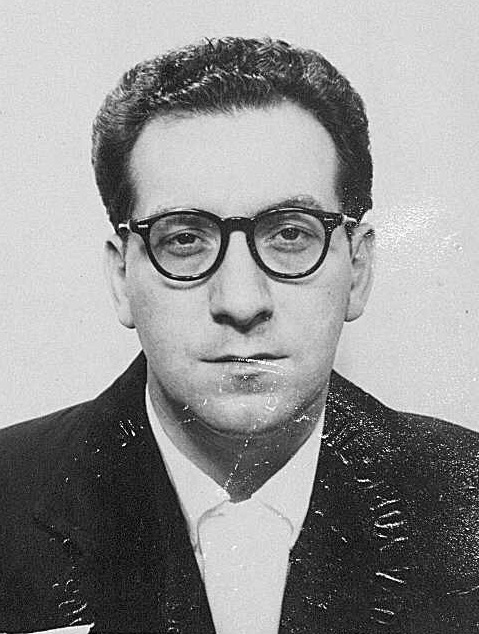
- Pompilli in 1958

Background information
- Also known as: Rudy Pell, Rudi
- Born: Rudolph Clement Pompilii; April 16, 1924; Chester, Pennsylvania, U.S.
- Died: February 5, 1976 (aged 51) Pennsylvania, U.S.
- Genres: Rock and roll, jazz Rockabilly
- Occupations: Musician
- Instruments: Saxophone, clarinet
- Years active: 1951–1976
- Formerly of: Bill Haley & His Comets

Rudolph Clement Pompilii (April 16, 1924 – February 5, 1976) was an American musician best known for playing tenor saxophone with Bill Haley and His Comets. He was usually credited under the alternate spelling Rudy Pompilli and occasionally as Rudy Pell.

== Biography ==
Pompilli was born in Chester, Pennsylvania. Occasional sources spell his first name as "Rudi", although Pompilli himself never used this form.

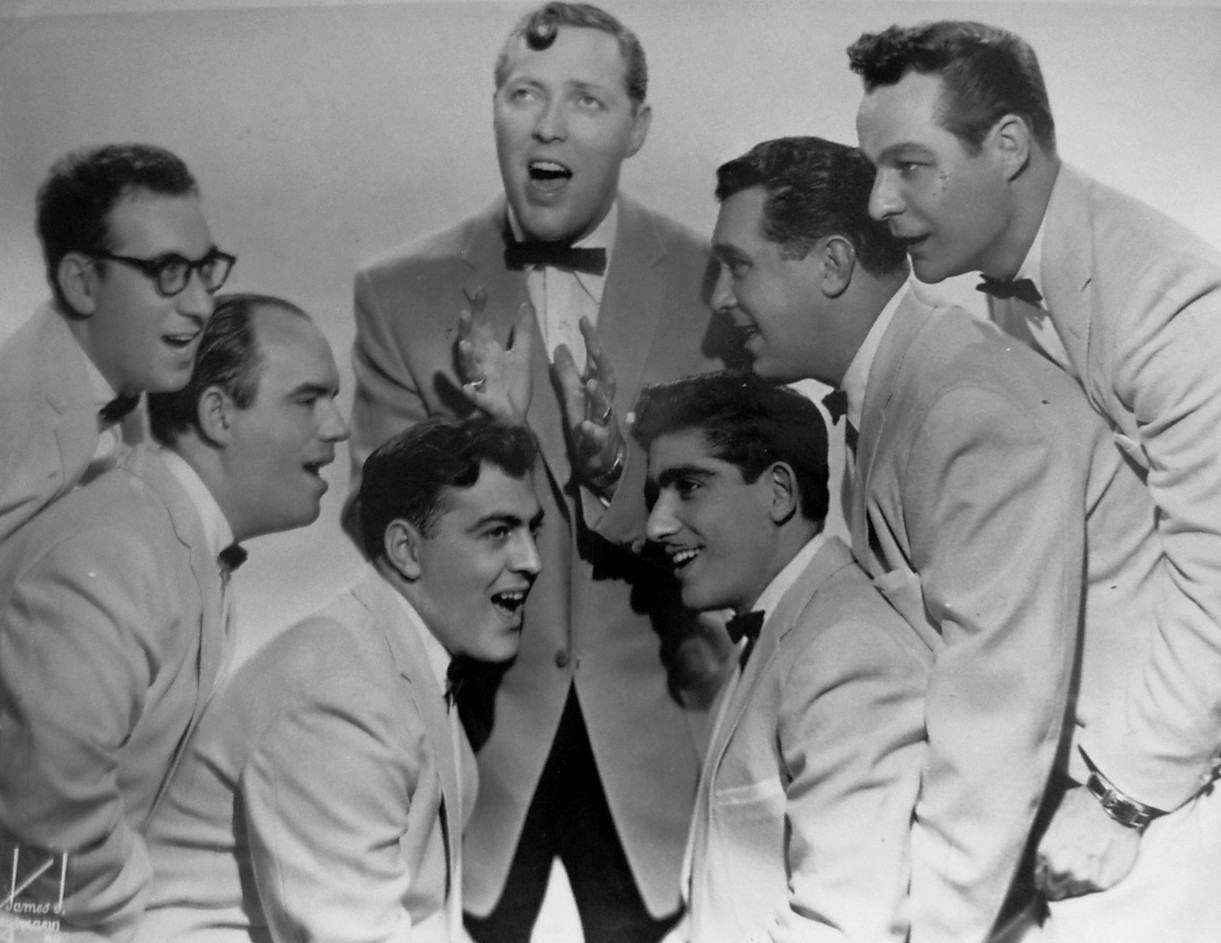
Bill Haley and his Comets in 1956. Left to right: Rudy Pompilli, Billy Williamson, Al Rex, Johnny Grande, Ralph Jones, Franny Beecher. Top: Bill Haley.

Pompilli was skilled at playing both saxophone and clarinet, and spent the beginning of his career playing in jazz bands. In 1953, he was with the Ralph Marterie Orchestra. That orchestra coincidentally scored a hit with a cover version of Haley's "Crazy Man, Crazy", though research by Haley historian Chris Gardner found no evidence that Pompilli performed on that recording.

Pompilli was invited to join the Comets in September 1955, after Haley's previous sax player, Joey Ambrose, quit along with two other Comets to form The Jodimars. According to Haley, the young horn player had a dislike for rock and roll musicians, but he nonetheless accepted the offer. Ambrose gave Pompilli a crash course in the Haley style of saxophone playing, and he also learned the stage antics pioneered by Ambrose and bass player Marshall Lytle, including playing the sax while lying flat on his back and jumping all over the bass player. (Lytle also left for the Jodimars and was replaced by Al Rex.)

At Haley's request, the new band member changed the spelling of his last name from "Pompilii" to "Pompilli", as Haley was concerned that the former looked like a typographical error. Pompilli also frequently used the alias "Rudy Pell" and many of his autographs from the 1950s have this name rather than Pompilli.

Within a few months of joining The Comets, Pompilli had become the band's most visible member (aside from Haley himself), becoming the focus of "Rudy's Rock", a show-stopping instrumental co-written by Pompilli and Haley that debuted in the 1956 film Rock Around the Clock. When released as a single, "Rudy's Rock" reached #34 on the Billboard singles chart and #38 on the Cashbox Top Singles list, spending 4 weeks on that chart, and making it the first instrumental record of the rock and roll era to chart. Other acclaimed, but less commercially successful instrumentals followed, most notably "Calling All Comets" which was performed in the band's next film, 1957's Don't Knock the Rock.

In 1958, Rudy's cousin, Al Pompilli, joined the Comets for a year, playing bass after the departure of Al Rex.

Rudy Pompilli co-wrote the hit "Week End" with Franny Beecher and Billy Williamson, which reached No. 35 on the Billboard pop chart when released as a single in 1958 as by The Kingsmen on East West Records, East West 115. He also co-wrote the B-side, "Better Believe It", with Johnny Grande and Ralph Jones. A follow-up single was released on East West, "Conga Rock", written by drummer Ralph Jones, backed with "The Catwalk", written by Franny Beecher and Billy Williamson, as East West 120. Pompelli composed the hit "Florida Twist" with Anthony Caruso, which reached No. 3 as an Orfeon 45 on the Mexican pop singles chart in 1962 based on the Billboard Hits of the World chart. "Florida Twist" has since become a party standard in Latin America and has been covered by many artists in rock and roll, Tex-Mex and other genres.

Bill Haley's band would undergo many changes of personnel over the next two decades, but the one constant was Rudy Pompilli, who would become the band's road manager, taking care of paying the bills and arranging for the hiring of new musicians when required. (Pompilli did briefly quit the Comets during 1960-61 and was replaced by Al Dean, but soon returned to the band.) Pompilli also did solo work, performing regularly in Philadelphia area nightclubs, either by himself or with members of the Comets.

== Illness, final years and death ==
Soon after a 1974 tour of Europe, Pompilli was diagnosed with lung cancer. He was not a smoker himself, and is believed to have contracted the disease through passive smoking. The ailing musician continued to tour with Haley throughout 1975 (including a tour of Brazil in October 1975), and that year also recorded his first and only solo album, Rudy's Rock: The Sax That Changed the World, which was recorded with session musicians and members of The Comets. He also continued to perform at the Nite Cap, a club in Chester, Pennsylvania; at one of his very last performances he performed with his former Comets bandmate Franny Beecher as well as then-current Comets guitarist Bill Turner.

Pompilli died from lung cancer on February 5, 1976, in Philadelphia. His death affected Haley deeply. After fulfilling touring commitments for the year with a replacement sax player, at the end of 1976 Haley announced his retirement from performing and moved full-time to Harlingen, Texas. Haley would return to touring and recording in 1979 and would dedicate a part of every show to Pompilli's memory with a performance of "Rudy's Rock".

== Birth date ==
During research for an article on the 30th anniversary of Pompilli's death, researcher Chris Gardner uncovered documents that showed Pompilli was actually born in 1924, not 1926 as had commonly been believed (like Haley, Pompilli also shaved two years off his age).

== Awards and honors ==
In 2012, Pompilli was inducted as a member of the Comets into the Rock and Roll Hall of Fame by a special committee, aimed at correcting the previous mistake of not inducting the band with Bill Haley in 1987.

== Compositions ==
He co-wrote "Week End" with Franny Beecher and Billy Williamson and the B side, "Better Believe It", with Johnny Grande and Ralph Jones. He co-wrote "Rudy's Rock" with Bill Haley and "Calling All Comets" with Bill Haley and Milt Gabler. He co-wrote "Hey Then, There Now" with Ralph Jones. He wrote "Florida Twist" with Anthony Caruso. He also co-wrote "Lean Jean". His other compositions were "China Twist", "Happy Twist", "Tacos de Twist", and "Twist del Dia" in 1962.

== Other sources ==
- Chris Gardner, "The Sax That Rocked the World", Now Dig This magazine, Issue 275, February 2006.
