= Franny Beecher =

American rock and roll musician (1921–2014)

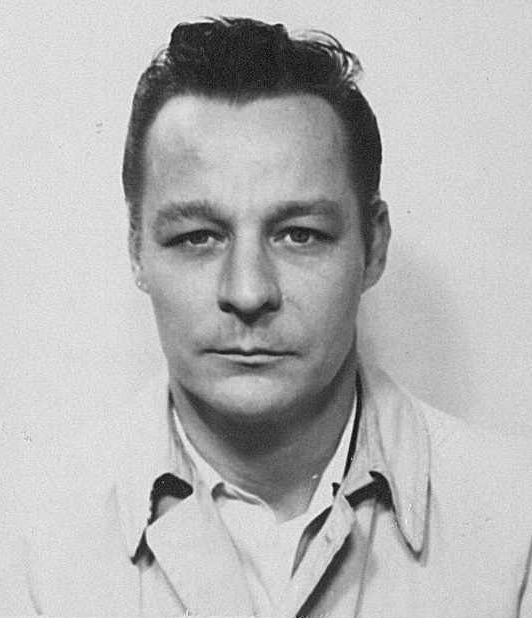
- Beecher in 1958

Background information
- Also known as: Frank Beecher
- Born: Francis Eugene Beecher; September 29, 1921; Norristown, Pennsylvania, U.S.
- Died: February 24, 2014 (aged 92) Philadelphia, Pennsylvania, U.S.
- Genres: Jazz, Rock
- Instrument: guitar
- Years active: 1940s–2014 (his death)

Francis Eugene Beecher (September 29, 1921 – February 24, 2014) was the lead guitarist for Bill Haley & His Comets from 1954 to 1962, and is best remembered for his innovative guitar solos that incorporated elements of jazz. He composed the classics "Blue Comet Blues", "Goofin' Around", "Week End", "The Catwalk", and "Shaky" when he was the lead guitarist for Bill Haley and the Comets. He continued to perform with surviving members of the Comets into 2006. In 2012, the Rock and Roll Hall of Fame inducted Beecher as a member of the Comets by a special committee, aimed at correcting the previous mistake of not inducting the Comets with Bill Haley.

== Career ==
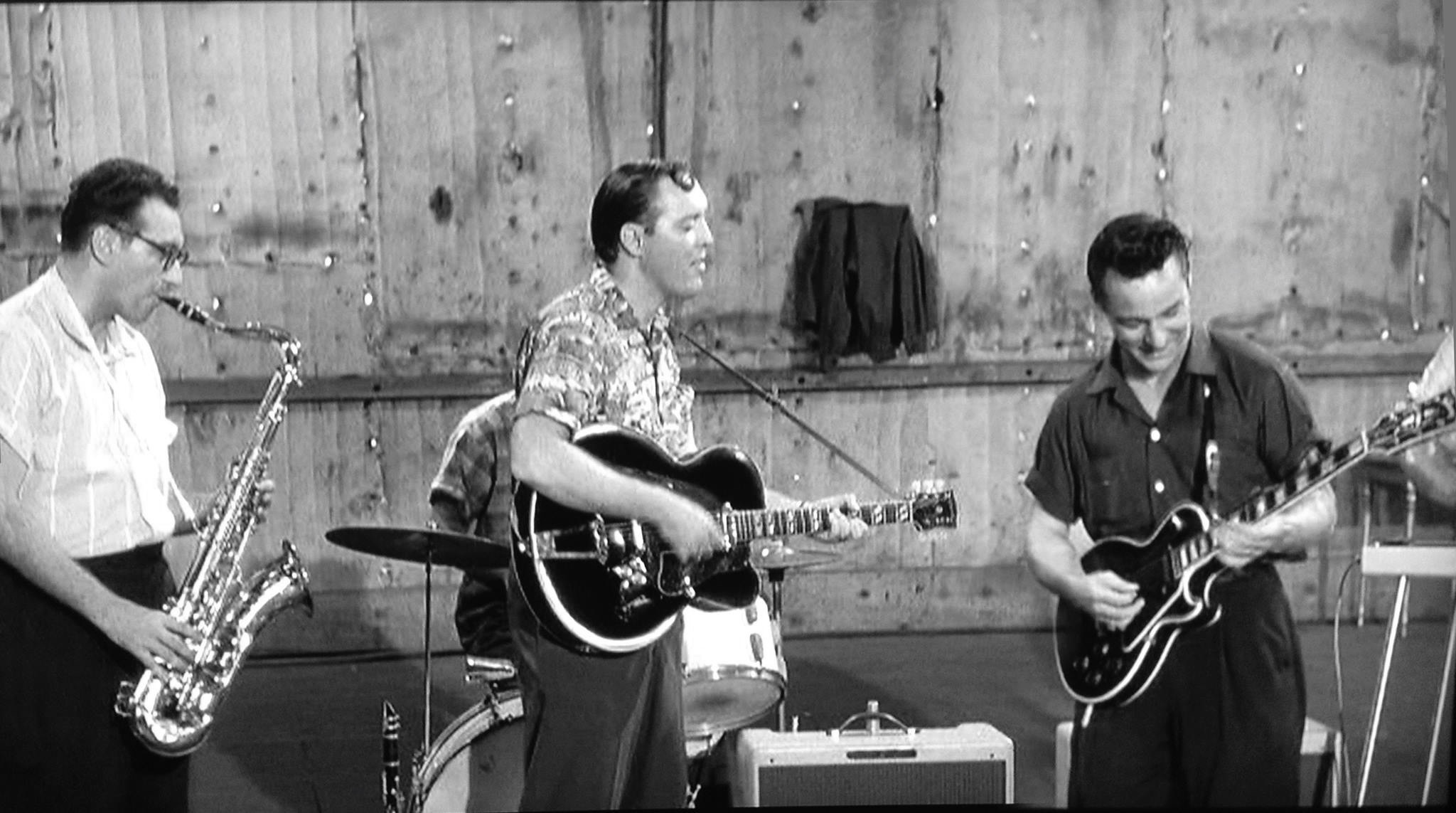
with Bill Haley and His Comets, left to right, Rudy Pompilli, Bill Haley, Franny Beecher

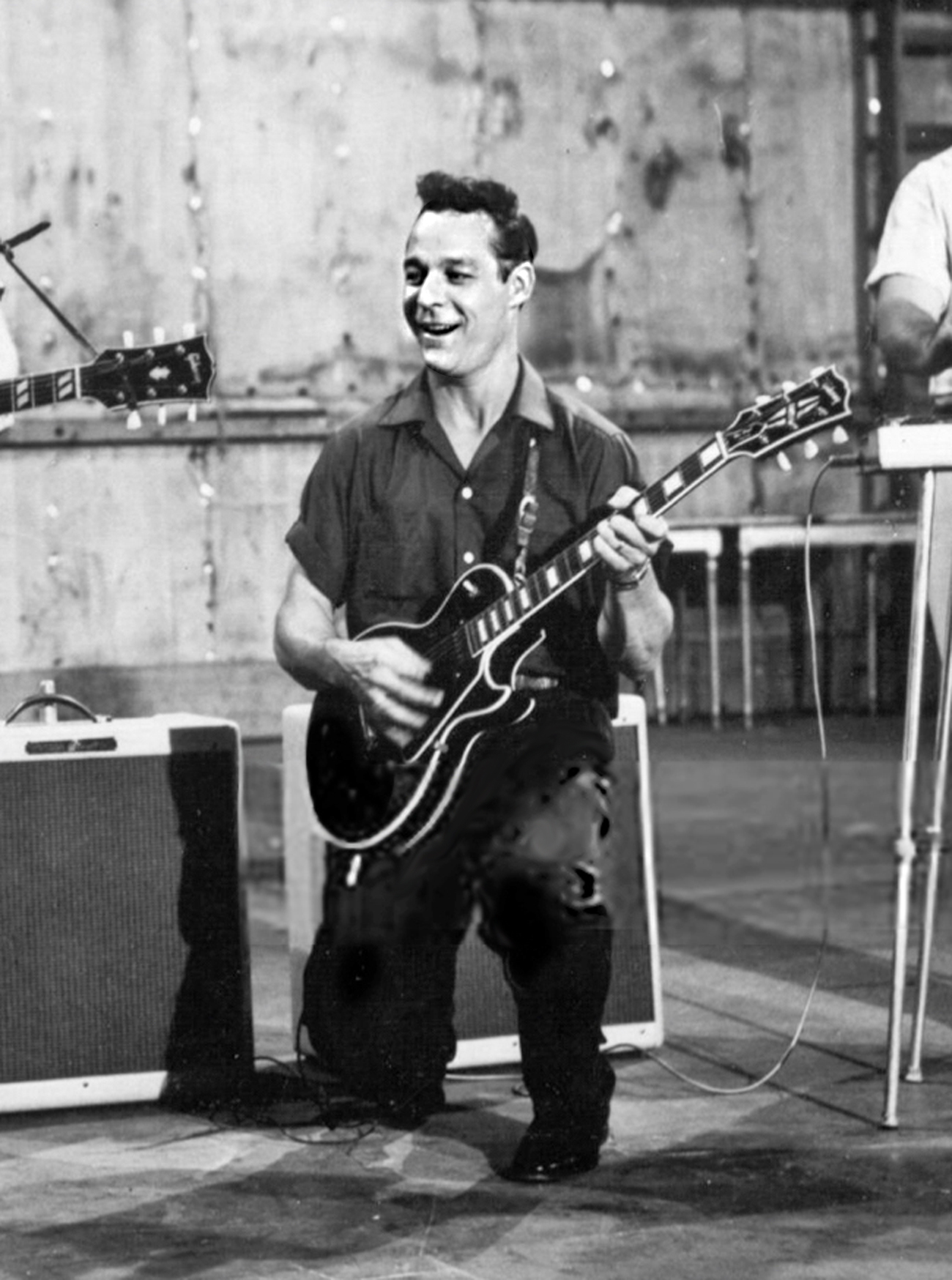

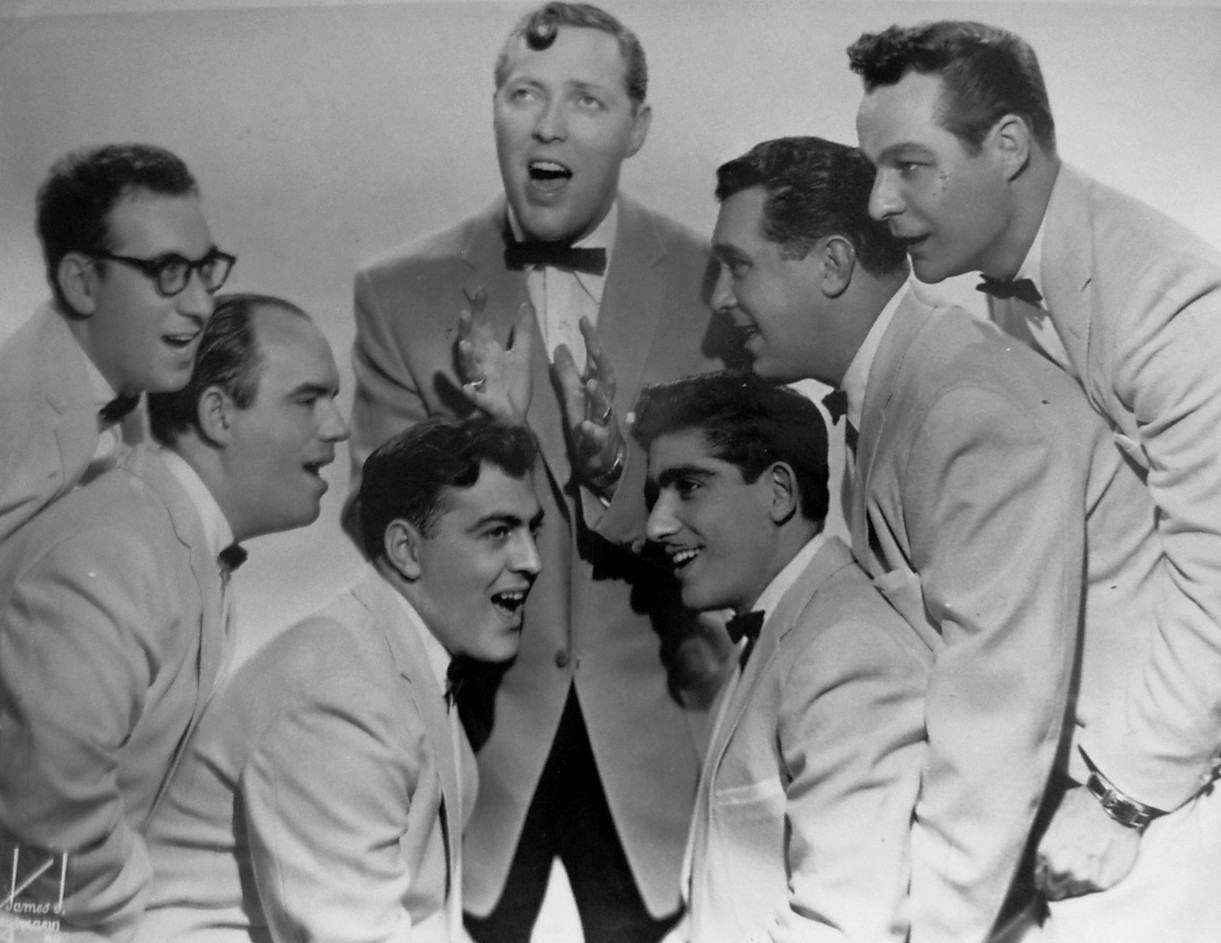
Bill Haley and His Comets in 1956. Left to right: Rudy Pompilli, Billy Williamson, Al Rex, Johnny Grande, Ralph Jones, Franny Beecher. Top: Bill Haley.

By the time Beecher became associated with Bill Haley, he had already had a lengthy career as a guitarist, having performed and recorded with the Benny Goodman Orchestra, which he joined in 1948, at a time Goodman was experimenting with music in the bebop idiom. He also worked with other big bands, with singer and former Goodman "bop band" pianist Buddy Greco and the Sharps, as well as with several country western groups. He played guitar on the 1947 single by Buddy Greco "Baby I'm True to You" backed with "How Many Times", released as Musicraft 569, and the 1948 single "Lillette" backed with "A Stranger in Town", as Musicraft 588. His guitar work influenced young musicians playing the same venues in the Philadelphia/Reading area where the Comets were based, among them the guitarist and future legendary comic-book writer-artist Jim Steranko.

Beecher first worked with the Comets in fall 1954 as a session musician, replacing the recently deceased guitarist Danny Cedrone. Beecher's first work with Haley was the single "Dim, Dim the Lights". Beecher had to be instructed to make his guitar solos less jazzy. "They wanted to play a more basic style than I was used to, more country really, they called it rockabilly."

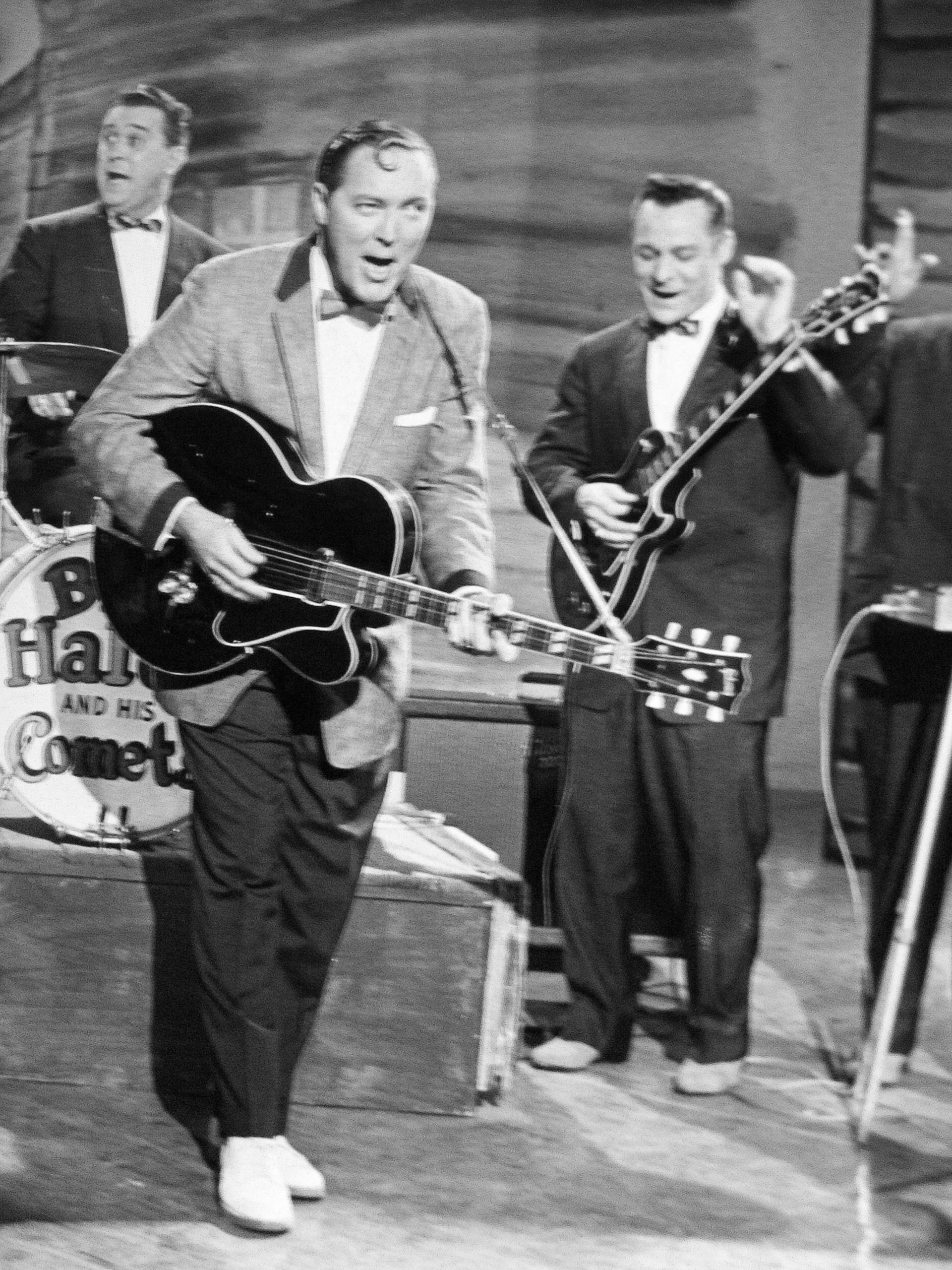
Bill Haley and Franny Beecher (right), 1958

At the time Beecher began working for Haley's group, Haley did not employ a full-time lead guitarist who would also play on live shows and TV appearances (such duties were usually handled by Haley himself or steel guitarist Billy Williamson). In August 1955, Beecher appeared for the first time on national TV with the Comets performing "Rock Around the Clock", and soon afterward was promoted to a full-time member of the band, appearing with the group in the films Rock Around the Clock (1956) and Don't Knock the Rock (1956), as well as several other film appearances: in Germany in 1958, Hier bin ich - hier bleib' ich (Here I Am, Here I Stay) (1959) and in Mexico in the early 1960s, such as Jóvenes y rebeldes (1961) and Besito a Papa (1961).

Beecher had the ability to send his voice into a high pitch (making it sound like that of a small child). This gimmick was used for the opening of the hit Haley single's "See You Later Alligator", "(You Hit the Wrong Note) Billy Goat" and "Rip It Up". According to Swenson, Beecher would also occasionally perform the voice during live shows, with Haley or Williamson humorously introducing him as a baritone. In 1959, Williamson and Beecher recorded a duet, "ABC Rock", in which Beecher sang two entire verses in his little-kid voice.

In 1958, Beecher and the other Comets recorded under the name The Kingsmen, releasing several 45 singles for East West Records. The single "Week End", released as East West 115 and backed with "Better Believe It", reached number 35 on the Billboard pop singles chart in November 1958. The follow-up single was "The Cat Walk" backed by "Conga Rock", released as East West 120.

"Week End" by The Kingsmen was a Top 40 single in 1958 on East West Records.

Beecher left the Comets in 1960 in order to work with a spin-off group called the Merri-Men which released a 45 single on Apt Records, "Big Daddy"/"St. Louis Blues"; he returned to the group in 1961 only to leave again in 1962. A few months later, he agreed to sit in with the band for a live album recording session for Roulette Records (the album was entitled Twisting Knights at the Roundtable). After Haley's death in 1981, Beecher toured with a short-lived Comets reunion group. Finally, starting in 1987, the surviving members of the 1954-55 Comets reunited and proceeded to tour the world and make new recordings for the next two decades. Beecher performed with this group until July 2006, after which the group announced he had retired; although it was announced that the 85-year-old guitarist would tour Europe with the Comets in early 2007, this did not occur.

Franny Beecher's compositions included "Blue Comet Blues", "Goofin' Around", "Shaky", "Tampico Twist", "The Beak Speaks", "Hot to Trot", "Beecher Boogie Woogie", "Whistlin' and Walkin' Twist", "The Catwalk", and "Week End", which was a chart hit with The Kingsmen, reaching no.35, co-written with Rudy Pompilli and Billy Williamson. "Week End" was recorded and released as a single by rock guitarist Link Wray in September, 1963 as Swan S-4154. Sid Phillips and His Band released "Week End" as a 45 single in the UK in 1958 on His Master's Voice. Red Price released "Week End" as a single in the UK on Pye Records in 1958.

With the Comets, Franny Beecher played a black 1956 Gibson Les Paul Custom which was given to him by the Gibson Guitar Company, then based in Kalamazoo, Michigan. Gibson also gave Bill Haley a blonde 1956 Super 400 and a black 1956 Gibson L-7. The Les Paul Custom featured a pair of black single coil P-90 pickups, one of which was a bar magnet P-90. Earlier, he had played a Gibson L-5 acoustic with a cutaway body and a DeArmond pickup, as noted in Sound and Glory, page 100. He played an Epiphone Emperor when he was a member of the Benny Goodman band in 1948 and 1949, which he also played on the Ed Sullivan Show during a performance of "Rock Around the Clock". In the Mexican film Juventide y rebeldes (1961), he is playing either a Gibson ES-345 or ES-355 Stereo. His other guitars included a blonde 1959 ES-350T, which in his later years he no longer owned. He played a cherry sunburst Gibson ES-137 Classic in concerts and while touring. In October 2007, Beecher performed as a special guest of the Rib House Band at the Bridgeport Rib House in Bridgeport, Pennsylvania.

== With Benny Goodman ==
Franny Beecher was the lead guitarist in the Benny Goodman Orchestra in 1948–49. He appeared on The Toast of the Town show (which later became The Ed Sullivan Show) on CBS television with the Benny Goodman band in December, 1948. He is featured on two Benny Goodman albums, Modern Benny on Capitol and Benny Goodman at the Hollywood Palladium. Personnel lists generally refer to him as Francis Beecher.

Modern Benny (Capitol ECJ-40001. Japanese release only) track list:

1. Ma Belle Marguerite (2/10/1949)
2. Having a Wonderful Wish (3/24/1949)
3. That Wonderful Girl of Mine (3/24/1949)
4. It Isn't Fair (3/24/1949)
5. Fresh Fish (3/31/1949)
6. The Hucklebuck (3/31/1949)
7. Don't Worry About Me (3/31/1949)
8. Little Girl Don't Cry (10/15/1949)
9. Why Don't We Do This More Often (10/15/1949) Dolly Houston vocal
10. Brother Bill (10/27/1949)
11. Spin a Record (10/27/1949)
12. I Had Someone Else Before I Had You (10/27/1949) Dolly Houston vocal
13. You're Always There (10/27/1949)
14. Let's Dance (3/25/1949) instrumental
15. Undercurrent Blues (3/25/1949) instrumental
16. Do Do Do (3/25/1949)
17. Trees (3/25/1949) instrumental
18. There's a Small Hotel (3/25/1949) instrumental (quartet)
19. Jersey Bounce (3/25/1949) instrumental
20. El Greco (3/25/1949) instrumental
21. Lover Man (3/25/1949) Terry Swope vocal
22. King Porter Stomp (3/25/1949) instrumental
23. Clarinade (3/25/1949) instrumental

== Death ==
Beecher died on February 24, 2014, in his sleep from natural causes. He was 92 years old.
