= Al Rex =

American guitarist (1928–2020)

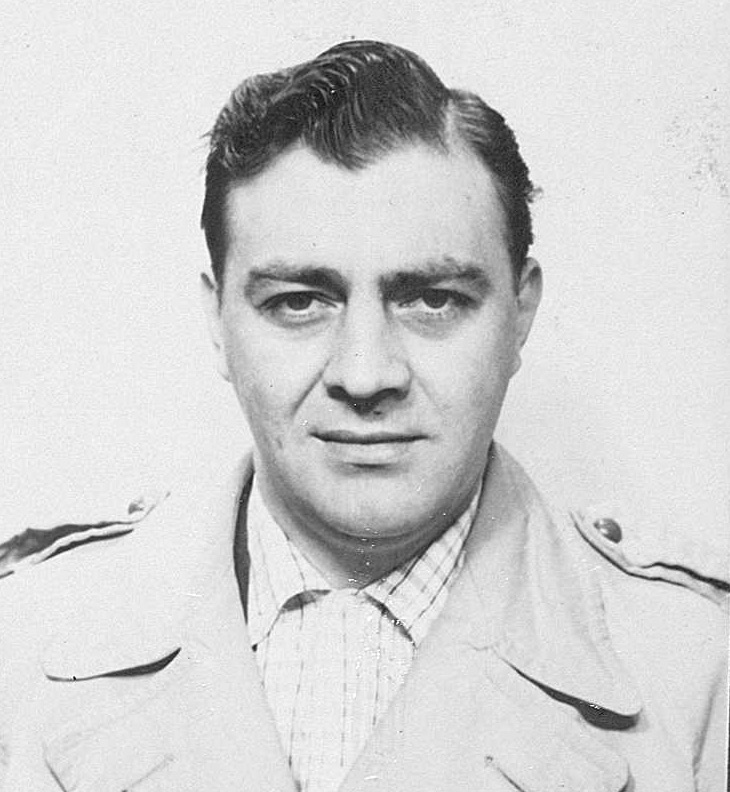
- Al Rex in 1958

Background information
- Birth name: Albert Floyd Piccirilli
- Born: July 13, 1928; Black Horse, Pennsylvania, U.S.
- Died: May 24, 2020 (aged 91); Norristown, Pennsylvania, U.S.
- Genres: Rock and roll, jazz, country
- Occupation: Bassist
- Instrument: Bass
- Years active: 1949–1960
- Formerly of: Bill Haley and the Saddlemen; Bill Haley & His Comets

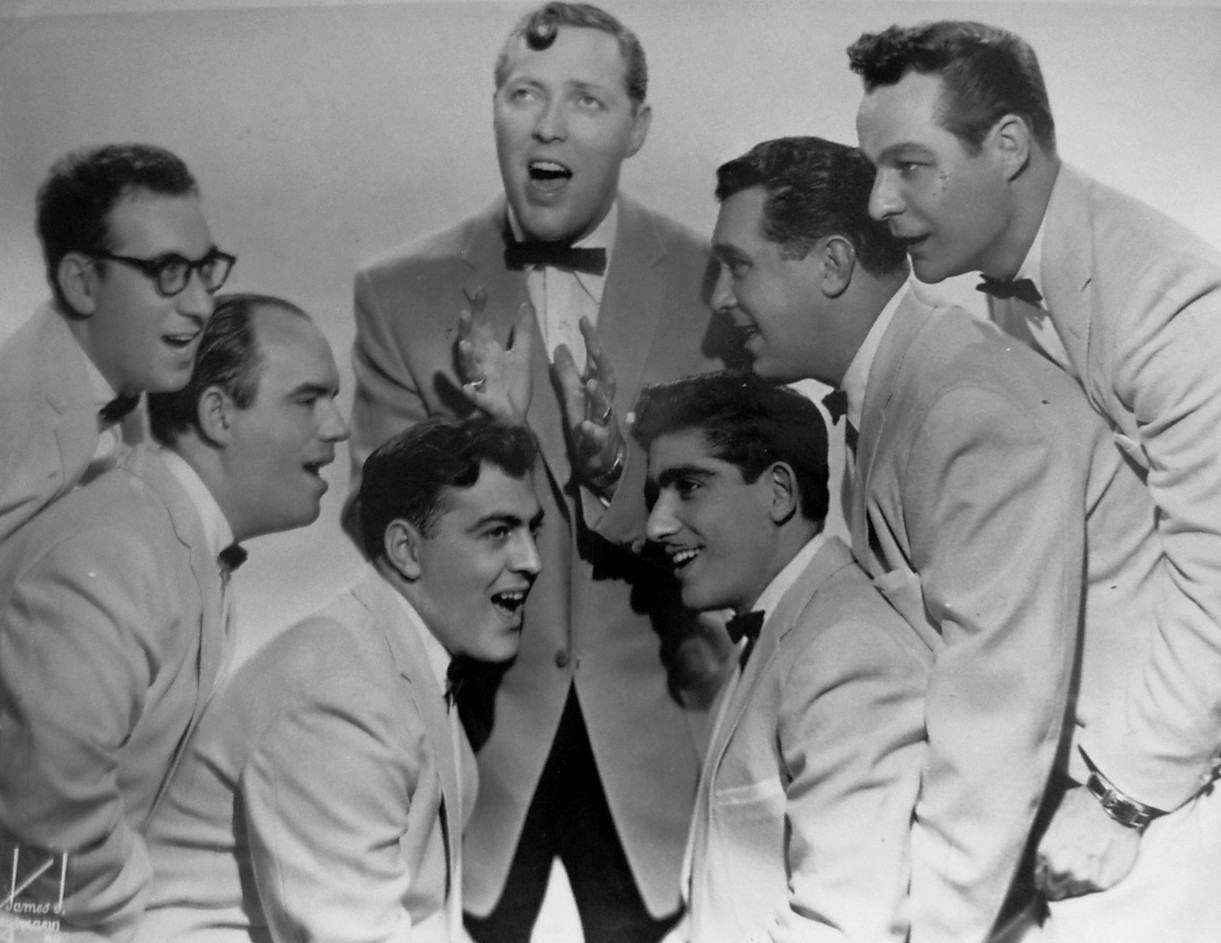
Bill Haley and His Comets in 1956. Left to right: Rudy Pompilli, Billy Williamson, Al Rex, Johnny Grande, Ralph Jones, Franny Beecher. Top: Bill Haley.

Albert Floyd Piccirilli (July 13, 1928 – May 24, 2020), also known by his stage name Al Rex, was an American bass player for Bill Haley & His Comets and its predecessor Bill Haley and the Saddlemen.

== Background ==
He started playing for them in 1949 and became noted for "wild antics" on stage. He formed his own band, Al Rex and the Regaleers in 1960. He left the music industry soon after, although he continued to perform on occasion. He later had a wife and fathered eight children. On May 24, 2020, he died in his Norristown, Pennsylvania home from pneumonia.

== Film appearances ==
He appeared as a member of the band in the 1950s films Rock Around the Clock (1956) and Don't Knock the Rock (1957).
