= Ralph Jones (musician) =

American drummer (1921–2000)

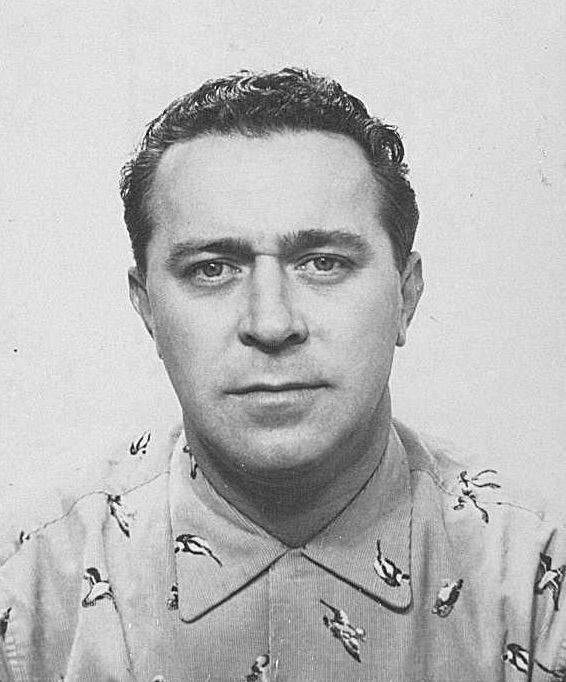

Background information
- Born: February 28, 1921
- Died: June 1, 2000 (aged 79) Chester, Pennsylvania, U.S.
- Genres: Jazz, Rock
- Instrument: Drums
- Labels: Decca, Warner Bros.
- Formerly of: Bill Haley & His Comets

Ralph Jones (February 28, 1921 – June 1, 2000) was an American drummer, best known for his work with Bill Haley & His Comets. Jones was ultimately Haley's fifth, joining The Comets at their peak in 1955 and ultimately staying until 1960. Jones played on many of Haley's hit records on Decca, including "See You Later, Alligator".

== Career ==
Jones auditioned to become the drummer for The Comets in November 1955, replacing former drummer Don Raymond. At the time of joining, Jones was working as a milkman. With the recording of the hit "See You Later, Alligator" in December, Jones became the first drummer of the Comets to be featured in a recording session (previous drummers were replaced by session musicians).

== Film appearances ==
He appeared as a member of the band in the 1950s films Rock Around the Clock (1956), Don't Knock the Rock (1957), and Here I Am, Here I Stay (1958).

== Legacy ==
In 2012, Jones along with most of the other 1950-1960 members of the Comets were inducted into the Rock and Roll Hall of Fame.
