= Last Sessions (Lenny Breau album) =

Studio album by Lenny Breau
- Released: 1988
- Recorded: December 1977 – January 1978
- Studio: Blank Tapes Recording Studio, New York City
- Genre: Jazz
- Length: 49:07
- Label: Adelphi
- Producer: Gene Rosenthal

Lenny Breau chronology
The Living Room Tapes, Vol. 1 (1986)	Last Sessions (1988)	The Living Room Tapes, Vol. 2 (1990)

Last Sessions is an album by Canadian jazz guitarist Lenny Breau that was recorded in 1977–78 and released posthumously in 1988. This album represents Breau's final studio recordings for Adelphi Records, not his last studio sessions, which were recorded in 1982 at Audio Media Studios in Nashville, Tennessee (released as When Lightn' Strikes).

== History ==
After signing a three-album deal with Gene Rosenthal for Adelphi Records in 1977, Breau recorded material over period of a few months. Rosenthal and Dan Doyle produced the first sessions recorded during October and November which would become Five O'Clock Bells and Mo' Breau. This posthumous release, recorded during December 1977 and January 1978, was produced by Rosenthal.

== Reception ==
Professional ratings
Review scores
Source	Rating
Allmusic	3/5 stars

== Track listing ==
1. "Ebony Queen/Pam's Pad" (McCoy Tyner/Lenny Breau) – 6:50
2. "Meanwhile Back In L.A." (Breau) – 3:44
3. "Paris" (Breau) – 8:35
4. "Ba De Da Da" (Breau) – 2:40
5. "Feelings" (Morris Albert, arranged by Breau) – 7:12
6. "I Love You" (Cole Porter) – 4:52
7. "Untitled Standard" (Breau) – 5:20
- CD Bonus Tracks
  - 8. "But Beautiful #2" (Jimmy Van Heusen, Johnny Burke) – 4:40
  - 9. "Beautiful Love" (Wayne King, Victor Young, Egbert Van Alstyne, Haven Gillespie) – 5:14

== Personnel ==
- Lenny Breau – guitar
