= Boy Wonder (album) =

1998 studio album by Lenny Breau

Studio album by Lenny Breau
- Released: 1998
- Recorded: 1956
- Genre: Jazz
- Length: 64:29
- Label: Guitarchives
- Producer: Al Hawkes

Lenny Breau chronology
Cabin Fever (1997)	Boy Wonder (1998)	Live at Donte's (2000)

Boy Wonder is a studio album by jazz guitarist Lenny Breau that was recorded in 1956 and released in 1998. The session was engineered and produced by Al Hawkes of Event Records.

== History ==
Breau was 15 years old when these tracks were recorded in 1956. At the time, he was performing with his parents Hal "Lone Pine" Breau and Betty Cody, professional country and western musicians who performed and recorded from the mid-1930s until (in Hal Breau's case) the mid-1970s. Breau began playing guitar at the age of eight and by the age of fourteen he was the lead guitarist for his parents' band, billed as "Lone Pine Junior". The final track is an interview of Breau's mother discussing how Breau developed his interest in the guitar.

== Reception ==
Professional ratings
Review scores
Source	Rating
Allmusic	2.5/5 stars

Writing for Allmusic, critic Dave Nathan wrote in his review: "The title of the album is very accurate; Breau was a "wonder," but still a "boy"; technically very sound, but stylistically undeveloped, vestiges of the country music syndrome are very apparent in his playing... While nowhere as developed as he was to become, this maiden album is a peek at the future... The sound, by the way, is excellent. The Boy Wonder album will be very attractive not only to lovers of the jazz guitar in general and Lenny Breau fans in particular, but to those interested in listening to a great jazz musician as he hones his skills."

== Track listing ==
1. "I'll See You in My Dreams" (Isham Jones, Gus Kahn) – 1:16
2. "Cannonball Rag" (Merle Travis) – 1:54
3. "John Henry" (Traditional) – :52
4. "Medley 1:" – 2:54
  1. "Alice Blue Gown" (Joseph McCarthy, Harry Tierney)
  2. "It's a Sin to Tell a Lie"
  3. "I've Been Working on the Railroad"
5. "Birth of the Blues" (Lew Brown, Buddy G. DeSylva, Ray Henderson) – 1:13
6. "Correna, Correna" (Traditional) – 1:15
7. "Medley 2:" – 6:41
  1. "By the Light of the Silvery Moon" (Gus Edwards, Edward Madden)
  2. "(Back Home Again in) Indiana" (James F. Hanley, Ballard MacDonald)
  3. "Barnyard Frolic"
  4. "Mr. Sandman" (Pat Ballard)
  5. "Third Man Theme" (Anton Karas)
8. "Sonny's Special" (Traditional) – 2:10
9. "Side by Side" (Harry M. Woods) – 2:31
10. "Rainbow" (Traditional) – 1:45
11. "The Blues Doubled" (Traditional) – 2:30
12. "Speedy Blues" (Traditional) – 1:12
13. "Blue Echo" (Chet Atkins, Boudleaux Bryant) – 1:05
14. "Indian Love Call" (Rudolf Friml, Oscar Hammerstein, Otto Harbach) – 2:30
15. "Indian Love Call" [alternate take] – 1:28
16. "Muskrat Ramble" (Kid Ory, Ray Gilbert) – 2:10
17. "Knock, Knock" (Traditional) – 2:08
18. "Caravan" (Duke Ellington, Irving Mills, Juan Tizol) – 1:27
19. "Chinatown, My Chinatown" (William Jerome, Jean Schwartz) – 1:09
20. "Dance of the Golden Rod" (Travis) – :43
21. "The Waltz You Saved for Me" (Gus Cahn, Emil Flindt, Wayne King) – 4:09
22. "Out of Nowhere" (Johnny Green, Edward Heyman) – 3:31
23. "They Say It's Wonderful" (Irving Berlin) – 2:11
24. "Blue Heartaches" (Traditional) – 2:24
25. "Blues in Extension" (Traditional) – 7:43
26. "Speedy Jazz" (Traditional) – 3:15
27. "September Song" (Kurt Weill, Maxwell Anderson) – 2:23
28. "Betty Cody-Breau / Al Hawkes Interview" – 5:12

== Personnel ==
- Lenny Breau – guitar

Production notes:

- Randy Bachman – executive producer, liner notes
- Don Bregg – mastering
