= The Complete Living Room Tapes =

Compilation album by Lenny Breau and Brad Terry
- Released: April 22, 2003
- Recorded: October 1978 – January 1982
- Genre: Jazz
- Label: Art of Life
- Producer: Brad Terry

Lenny Breau chronology
The Hallmark Sessions (2003)	The Complete Living Room Tapes (2003)	At the Purple Onion (2004)

The Complete Living Room Tapes is a compilation album by Canadian guitarist Lenny Breau and clarinetist Brad Terry that was released in 2003.

The Complete Living Room Tapes consists of the previously released The Living Room Tapes volumes One and Two and was remastered with bonus tracks.

Both solo and duet performances are included in these sessions. They were recorded at the home of Brad Terry in Maine on an informal basis, although both Breau and Terry had discussed commercially releasing the recordings. They were released by Terry after Breau's death.

The song "Visions" is mislabeled. It's a version of the song "Vision" from McCoy Tyner's album Expansions.

== Track listing ==
1. "Blues for Carole" – 9:06
2. "How High the Moon" (Nancy Hamilton, Morgan Lewis) – 7:45
3. "You Needed Me" (Randy Goodrum) – 5:07
4. "The Claw" (Jerry Reed) – 3:02
5. "Secret Love" (Sammy Fain, Paul Francis Webster) – 7:49
6. "Sweet Georgia Brown" (Ben Bernie, Maceo Pinkard, Kenneth Casey) – 6:24
7. "Foolish Heart" (Victor Young) – 5:35
8. "I Fall in Love Too Easily" (Sammy Cahn, Jule Styne) – 5:10
9. "Send in the Clowns" (Stephen Sondheim) – 3:54
10. "Nine Pound Hammer" (Merle Travis) – 2:35
11. "Cannonball Rag" (Travis) – 1:31
12. "Flamenco" – 5:15
13. "It Could Happen to You" (Johnny Burke, Jimmy Van Heusen) – 7:34
14. "Visions" (McCoy Tyner) – 6:11
15. "Remembering the Rain" (Bill Evans) – 6:27
16. "Autumn Leaves" (Joseph Kosma, Johnny Mercer, Jacques Prévert) – 7:28
17. "(Back Home Again in) Indiana" (James F. Hanley, Ballard MacDonald) – 6:08
18. "Stella by Starlight" (Victor Young, Ned Washington) – 7:14
19. "Emily" (Johnny Mandel, Johnny Mercer) – 8:17
  Reissue bonus tracks:
20. "My Funny Valentine" (Richard Rodgers, Lorenz Hart) – 8:56
21. "Autumn Leaves" (Kosma, Mercer, Prévert) – 18:01
22. "Johnny Cash Sings Jazz?" (Breau) – 1:30
23. "Lenny's Radio" (Breau) – 3:08

== Personnel ==
- Lenny Breau – guitar, vocals
- Brad Terry – clarinet, whistle, liner notes, engineer

Production notes:

- Paul Kohler – executive producer, art direction, digital mastering, graphic layout
- Leroy Parkins – liner notes
