= Make My Home Where I Hang My Hat =

Studio album by Johnny Copeland
- Released: 1982
- Genre: Blues, Texas blues, soul blues
- Label: Rounder
- Producer: Dan Doyle

Johnny Copeland chronology
| Copeland Special (1981) | Make My Home Where I Hang My Hat (1982) | Texas Twister (1983) |

Make My Home Where I Hang My Hat is an album by the American musician Johnny Copeland, released in 1982. He supported it with North American and African tours.

== Production ==
The album was produced by Dan Doyle. Copeland was influenced in part by the playing of Gatemouth Brown and T-Bone Walker. He was backed by a 4-piece horn section. Many of the songs were arranged with help from his keyboardist, Ken Vangel. "Boogie Woogie Nighthawk" was written by James "Widemouth" Brown. "Well, Well Baby-La" is a cover of a song most associated with Nappy Brown. "Rock 'n' Roll Lilly" is a version of Copeland's first single.

== Critical reception ==
Professional ratings
Review scores
| Source | Rating |
|---|---|
| All Music Guide to the Blues | 3/5 stars |
| Robert Christgau | B |
| Houston Chronicle | 4/5 stars |
| Lincoln Journal Star | 3.5/5 stars |
| MusicHound Blues: The Essential Album Guide | 2.5/5 stars |
| Omaha World-Herald | 3.5/5 stars |
| Valley Advocate | 4/5 stars |

The New York Times said, "The saxophonist Joe Rigby merits special praise for his lunging solos, but the entire group plays punchy, percolating music, and Mr. Copeland displays his soulman's sandpaper voice, his arsenal of aggressive guitar licks, and the ability, relatively unusual in modern blues, to write strikingly original lyrics." The Globe and Mail found the horn section to be lacking but praised "the original songs, any one of which could become an instant standard in any blues band's repertoire." The Philadelphia Inquirer stated that Copeland "rarely takes extended solos, preferring instead to add color and emotion to the music stirred up by his crack back-up band".

The Star-Ledger noted that Copeland's playing "cuts through the fine small band arrangements with anarchic heat tempered by classic phrasing". The Press praised his "flexible and on-target voice". The Lincoln Journal Star labeled the album "soul blues". The Telegraph & Argus called Copeland "a gritty contemporary blues maestro." The Boston Globe's Jeff McLaughlin listed Make My Home Where I Hang My Hat among the 10 best albums of 1982.

== Track listing ==
| No. | Title | Length |
|---|---|---|
| 1. | "Natural Born Believer" |
| 2. | "Make My Home Where I Hang My Hat" |
| 3. | "Devil's Hand" |
| 4. | "Cold Outside" |
| 5. | "Love Utopia" |
| 6. | "Boogie Woogie Nighthawk" |
| 7. | "Honky Tonkin'" |
| 8. | "Well, Well Baby-La" |
| 9. | "Old Man Blues" |
| 10. | "Rock 'n' Roll Lilly" |
