= Mo' Breau =

Studio album by Lenny Breau
- Released: 1981
- Recorded: October–November 1977, January 1978
- Studio: Blank Tapes Recording Studio, New York City
- Genre: Jazz
- Length: 34:45
- Label: Adelphi
- Producer: Dan Doyle; Gene Rosenthal

Lenny Breau chronology
Standard Brands (1981)	Mo' Breau (1981)	When Lightn' Strikes (1982)

Mo' Breau is an album by Canadian jazz guitarist Lenny Breau that was released in 1981.

== History ==
Breau signed a three-album deal with Gene Rosenthal for Adelphi Records in 1977, the first of which was produced by Rosenthal and was released as Five O'Clock Bells. Subsequent recordings from these sessions were produced by Dan Doyle and resulted in Mo' Breau and Last Sessions.

Originally released on LP in 1981, it was reissued in 1987 on the Genes label and again reissued along with Five O'Clock Bells.

== Reception ==
Professional ratings
Review scores
Source	Rating
Allmusic	4.5/5 stars

== Track listing ==
1. "Ebony Queen/Pam's Pad" (McCoy Tyner / Lenny Breau) – 7:30
2. "Autumn Leaves" (Joseph Kosma, Johnny Mercer, Jacques Prévert) – 2:01
3. "...But Beautiful" (Jimmy Van Heusen, Johnny Burke) – 5:04
4. "Emily" (Johnny Mandel, Johnny Mercer) – 3:40
5. "New York City" (Breau) – 5:04
6. "I Remember Hank" (Breau) – 5:18
7. "Marlborough Street" (Breau) – 2:06
8. "Lone Pine" (Breau) – 4:02

== Personnel ==
- Lenny Breau – guitar, vocals
