= Quietude =

Quietude may refer to:

- Quietude (Lenny Breau album), 1985 album
- Quietude (Eliane Elias album), 2022 album
