= Copeland Special =

Studio album by Johnny Copeland
- Released: 1981
- Studio: Blank Tapes, New York City
- Genre: Blues
- Label: Rounder, Demon, Black & Blue
- Producer: Dan Doyle

Johnny Copeland chronology
Copeland Special (1981)	Make My Home Where I Hang My Hat (1982)

Copeland Special is an album by the American musician Johnny Copeland. It was in 1981 on Rounder Records in the United States, Demon Records in the United Kingdom, and Black & Blue Records in France. It was recorded and mixed at Blank Tapes, in New York City, and produced by Dan Doyle. The album won a W. C. Handy Award.

== Critical reception ==
Professional ratings
Review scores
Source	Rating
AllMusic	4.5/5 stars
Robert Christgau	A−
Tom Hull – on the Web	B+

Robert Christgau wrote that the "conviction [is] more palpable here than on any new blues to come my way since Johnny Shines's 1977 Too Wet to Plow."

== Track listing ==
1. "Claim Jumper"
2. "I Wish I Was Single"
3. "Everybody Wants a Piece of Me"
4. "Copeland Special"
5. "It´s My Own Tears"
6. "Third Party"
7. "Big Time"
8. "Down on Bended Knee"
9. "Done Got Over It"
10. "St. Louis Blues"

== Personnel ==
- Johnny Copeland – guitar, vocals
- John Leibman – guitar
- Don Whitcomb – bass
- Mansfield Hitchman – drums (except on tracks 1, 3, 5, 7)
- Candy McDonald – drums on tracks 1, 3, 5
- Julian Vaughan – drums on track 7
- Anthony Browne – organ on tracks 2, 5
- Ken Vangel – piano arrangements
- Brookly Slim – harmonica on track 4
- George Adams – tenor & soprano saxophone
- Arthur Blythe – alto saxophone
- Byard Lancaster – alto & tenor saxophone
- Joe Rigby – baritone saxophone
- Bill Ohashi, Garrett List – trombone
- John Pratt, Yusef Yancey – trumpet
