= Joey Hollingsworth =

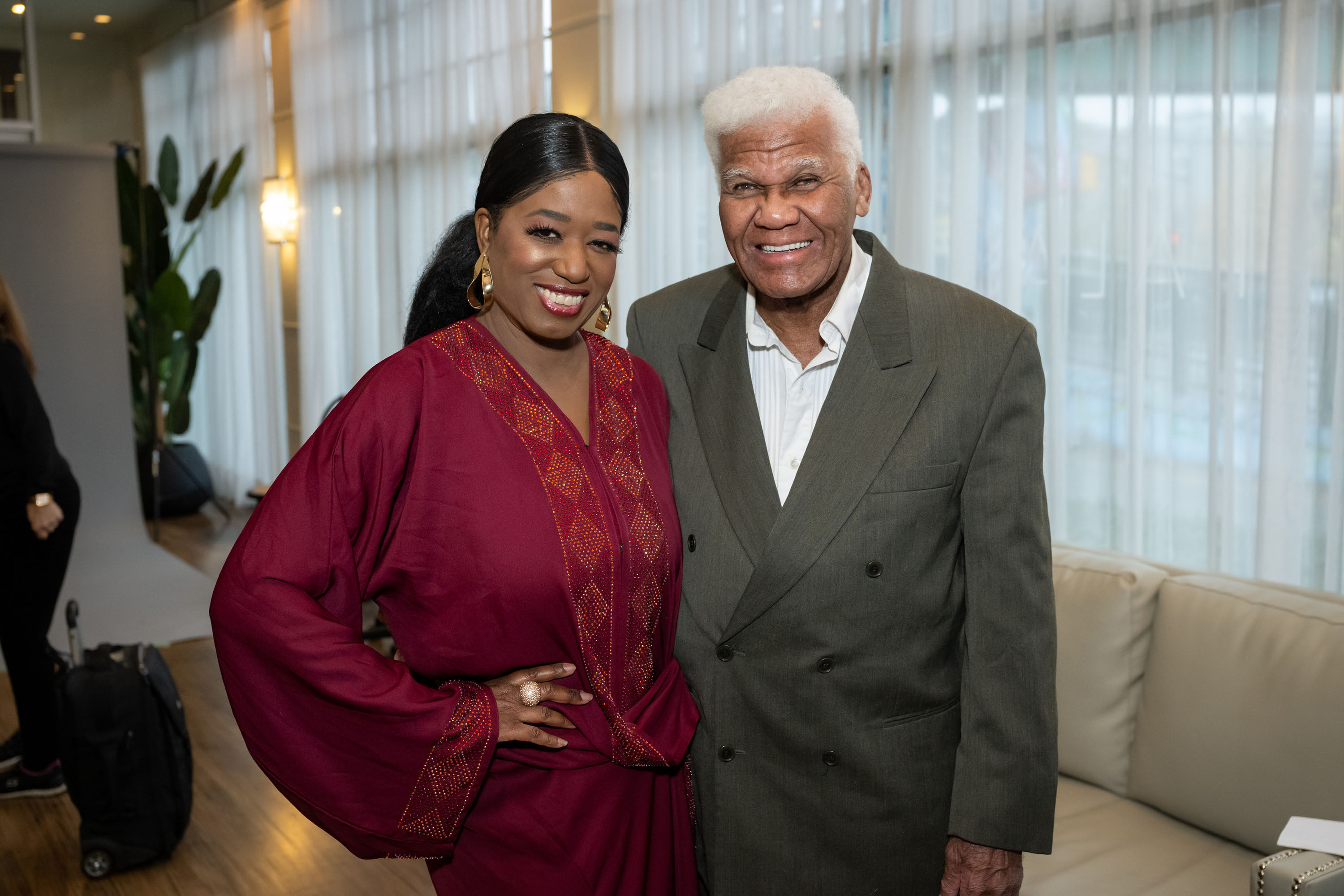
- Nicole Inica Hamilton with Tap Dancer Joey Hollingsworth - 2024
- Born: 1937 (age 88–89); Canada
- Spouse: Dolina
- Dancing career
- Dances: Tap

Joey Hollingsworth (born 1937) is a Canadian tap dancer, singer, and conga player who has performed on stage and screen throughout the world. He appeared regularly on Canadian television shows from the 1950s through the 1970s.

Hollingsworth, an adoptee, began dancing at the age of three, and turned professional at age five. Hollingsworth was listed as being 10 years old when he was Page One news in The Free Press on Nov. 23, 1946. The story told of his backstage meeting with dance legend Bill (Bojangles) Robinson the previous night (Nov. 22, 1946) at the old London Arena (since demolished).

"Let's see you do a little step," Robinson told the youngster. "Say, son, that's great. Where did you learn that?" Robinson said after the young Joey offered a few steps. "Saw you do it up on stage there," Joey replied.

The two spent about 10 minutes together with Bojangles offering the future star "about $500 worth of dancing lessons for free," The Free Press reported.

In the early 1950s, Hollingsworth became the first black man to appear on CBC television, as a competitor on Pick the Stars. He did not win, and learned years later from one of the judges that racism had influenced the outcome.

In 1962, Hollingsworth sang and tap-danced on the live album At the Purple Onion, with guitarist Lenny Breau and vocalist Don Francks.

In 1997, Hollingsworth was cast in the lead role of Hot Mikado, a musical comedy based on The Mikado by Gilbert and Sullivan. He described the experience as "the thrill of a lifetime."

Toward the end of his career, Hollingsworth worked in Dawson City on shows for the Palace Grand Theatre and Diamond Tooth Gertie's Gambling Hall.

Hollingsworth's television appearances have included The Ed Sullivan Show, the Wayne and Shuster Show, The Tennessee Ernie Ford Show, and Mister Rogers' Neighborhood.

Hollingsworth was inducted into the Jack Richardson Music Hall Of Fame on April 9, 2017. His on-stage performance that night at the London Music Hall peaked with his signature "spin move" as the song Mr. Bojangles was played and an image of Hollingsworth making the same move earlier in his career was projected on a screen behind him.
