= Scrapple from the Apple =

1947 jazz composition by Charlie Parker

"Scrapple from the Apple" is a bebop composition by Charlie Parker written in 1947, commonly recognized today as a jazz standard, written in F major. The song borrows its chord progression from "Honeysuckle Rose", a common practice for Parker, who based many of his tunes on already well-known chord changes.

While the A section is based on "Honeysuckle Rose", the B section or "middle eight" comes from the rhythm changes, which are based on George Gershwin's "I Got Rhythm".

== Other versions ==
- Lenny Breau – Pickin' Cotten (1977, released 2001)
- Richie Cole and Phil Woods - Side by Side (1981)
- Sonny Criss with Tal Farlow – Up, Up, and Away (1967)
- Miles Davis – Many Miles of Davis (1962)
- Curtis Fuller – Jazz Conference Abroad (1962)
- Dexter Gordon – Our Man in Paris (1963)
- Jim Hall – Jim Hall Live! (1975)
- Tom Harrell with Kenny Garrett and Kenny Barron – Moon Alley (1985)
- Keith Jarrett – After the Fall (1998, released 2018)
- Frank Morgan Quartet – Yardbird Suite (1988)
- Gerry Mulligan and Stan Getz – Gerry Mulligan Meets Stan Getz (1957)
- Charlie Parker – Charlie Parker on Dial (1947, released 1993)
- Oscar Pettiford/Red Mitchell – Jazz Mainstream (1957)
- Red Rodney – Scrapple from the Apple (1975)
- Helge Schneider – Es rappelt im Karton (1995)
- Larry Schneider – Mohawk (1994)
- Sonny Stitt – Stitt Plays Bird (1963)
- Sonny Stitt with Oscar Peterson – Sonny Stitt Sits in with the Oscar Peterson Trio (1959)
- The Charlie Watts Orchestra – Live at Fulham Town Hall (1986)
- Phil Woods with Red Garland – Sugan (1957)

== See also ==
- Contrafact
- List of 1940s jazz standards
