= Lenny Breau (album) =

Studio album by Lenny Breau
- Released: June 1979
- Recorded: February 22, 1979
- Studio: Sound Stage, Nashville, Tennessee
- Genre: Jazz
- Length: 34:22
- Label: Direct-Disk Labs
- Producer: Joe Overholt

Lenny Breau chronology
Five O'Clock Bells (1979)	Lenny Breau (1979)	The Legendary Lenny Breau... Now! (1979)

Lenny Breau is an album by Canadian guitarist Lenny Breau, released in 1979.

== History ==
Originally released on Direct-Disk Labs, it was reissued in 1995 on the Adelphi label and as Lenny Breau Trio on CD on the Genes label in 1999.

Breau's friend and mentor Chet Atkins guests on "You Needed Me".

== Reception ==
Professional ratings
Review scores
Source	Rating
Allmusic	3/5 stars
JazzTimes	(favorable)
DownBeat	4/5 stars

Writing for Allmusic, music critic Scott Yanow called Breau "in fine form" and wrote of the album "This album gives listeners a strong example of his legendary artistry." In reviewing the Adelphi reissue for JazzTimes, critic Bill Milkowski wrote "Breau demonstrates mind-boggling facility and fluidity on a jazzy interpretation of Bob Dylan's 'Don't Think Twice (It's Alright)' and on a blistering, pent-up rendition of John Coltrane's 'Mister Night.' Jazz guitarists everywhere need to check out this remarkable (and remarkably overlooked) player."

Pete Welding wrote in his 4 star DownBeat review, "His playing here is so beautifully surfaced, so finely wrought and rich in detail, executed with such spellbinding technical finesse that one literally is seduced by it.

== Track listing ==
1. "You Needed Me" (Randy Goodrum) – 4:31
2. "Don't Think Twice (It's All Right)" (Bob Dylan) – 6:35
3. "Mister Night" (John Coltrane) – 4:45
4. "Neptune" (Lenny Breau) – 8:32
5. "Claude (Free Song)" (Breau) – 6:27

== Personnel ==
- Lenny Breau – guitar
- Chet Atkins – guitar ("You Needed Me")
- Don Thompson – bass
- Claude Ranger – drums
