= Taranta =

Taranta may refer to:

- Taranta Peligna, Italian comune in Abruzzo
- Taranta, parish in Italian comune Cassano d'Adda, in Lombardia
- Taranta, 2012 album by Mina Tindle
- Taranta, a Lenny Breau song included on the 1968 album Guitar Sounds from Lenny Breau
- Tarantas, a style of flamenco music
- Agapornis taranta, scientific name of the parrot Black-winged lovebird
- Notte della Taranta, Italian music festival in Salento
- Super Taranta!, album by Gogol Bordello

== See also ==
- Taranto, southern Italian city
- Tarantella, southern Italian dance
- Tarantass, a four-wheeled horse-drawn vehicle
