= Bruce Mathiske =

Australian guitarist

Bruce Mathiske is a Newcastle Australia-based virtuoso solo guitarist who has released 17 plus albums. Mathiske has studied both jazz and classical music.

His large finger span enables him to play Rhythm Lead and bass at the same time, giving the impression that more than one person is playing guitar.

== Personal life ==
He was born in 1963 and hails from Swan Hill. At the age of seven, he started studying music, and he has continued to do so throughout his life. At the age of fifteen, he relocated to Bendigo, where he studied classical guitar. He would practice for up to ten hours a day.

When he was 18, he was accidentally shot whilst out spotlighting. This led to paralysis in his arm for over a year. This was later followed by a battle with hepatitis.

He has toured Europe, North America and Japan, and has made appearances at various festivals.

== Influences ==
Bruce credits Chet Atkins as being his major influence, however he also lists artists such as B.B. King, Lenny Breau, Barney Kessell, Robin Ford, Leo Kottke and Tommy Emmanuel

== Discography ==
Sourced from Discogs

Discography
Year	Title	Label	Format
1988	Never Alone	Sandstock	Vinyl, Cassette
1990	Constant Companion	Sandstock	Vinyl, CD
1992	Still	Sandstock	Vinyl, CD
1997	I wish	Mathiske Music	Vinyl, CD
1999	Nightmare	Mathiske Music	Vinyl, CD
2001	On the Edge	Mathiske Music	Vinyl, CD
2004	And Guitar	Mathiske Music	Vinyl, CD
2005	Live In Ireland (with Friends)	Rhythm Hunter	CD
2005	International Departure	tbc	tbc
2007	Rhythms	Rhythm Hunter	Vinyl, CD
2008	Still Got My Guitar	tbc	tbc
2010	Rhythm Hunter	tbc	tbc
2010	Still	tbc	tbc
2011	Guitar-Uoso	Rhythm Hunter	CD
2013	My Life	Rhythm Hunter	Vinyl, CD
2017	soundawareness	tbc	tbc
2018	Six String Anthology	tbc	tbc
