= Funkallero =

Jazz composiiton by pianist Bill Evans

"Funkallero" is a jazz standard composed by the pianist Bill Evans in the mid 1950s. Evans biographer Peter Pettinger notes that it bears "more than a passing resemblance to Bud Powell's 'Un Poco Loco.'" Evans himself said of his composition, "I was getting into kind of a swing thing, and this line just naturally came out of that feeling. It's a natural vehicle for blowing."

The piece was first recorded by Evans with vibraphonist Don Elliott in 1956, but that version was not released until 2001, on the album Tenderly: An Informal Session.

Evans subsequently recorded it with a quintet featuring Zoot Sims in 1962, but again, that recording was only released posthumously, in 1982 on The Interplay Sessions. Evans recorded it again in 1964, this time in a quartet with Stan Getz, but once again, release of the recording was delayed, in this case to 1973.

The first recording of the piece that was officially released was on his 1971 Grammy Award winning The Bill Evans Album, the first album by the pianist featuring exclusively his own originals. Another version with Getz was recorded live in 1974 and released in 1996 on the album But Beautiful.

The piece has been covered by a number of other notable artists, including guitarist Lenny Breau on his 1977 recording Pickin' Cotten, pianist Mike Wofford on his 1988 album Funkallero, pianist David Benoit on his 1989 album Waiting for Spring, the big band Orange Then Blue on their 1991 album Funkallero, pianist Andy LaVerne on his 1992 tribute album Bill Evans...Person We Knew, woodwind specialist Bud Shank on his 1996 tribute album Plays the Music of Bill Evans, and vocalist Roseanna Vitro on her 2001 tribute album Conviction: Thoughts of Bill Evans, in this case with lyrics by the famous songwriting team Alan and Marilyn Bergman.
