= Al Hawkes =

American musician (1930–2018)

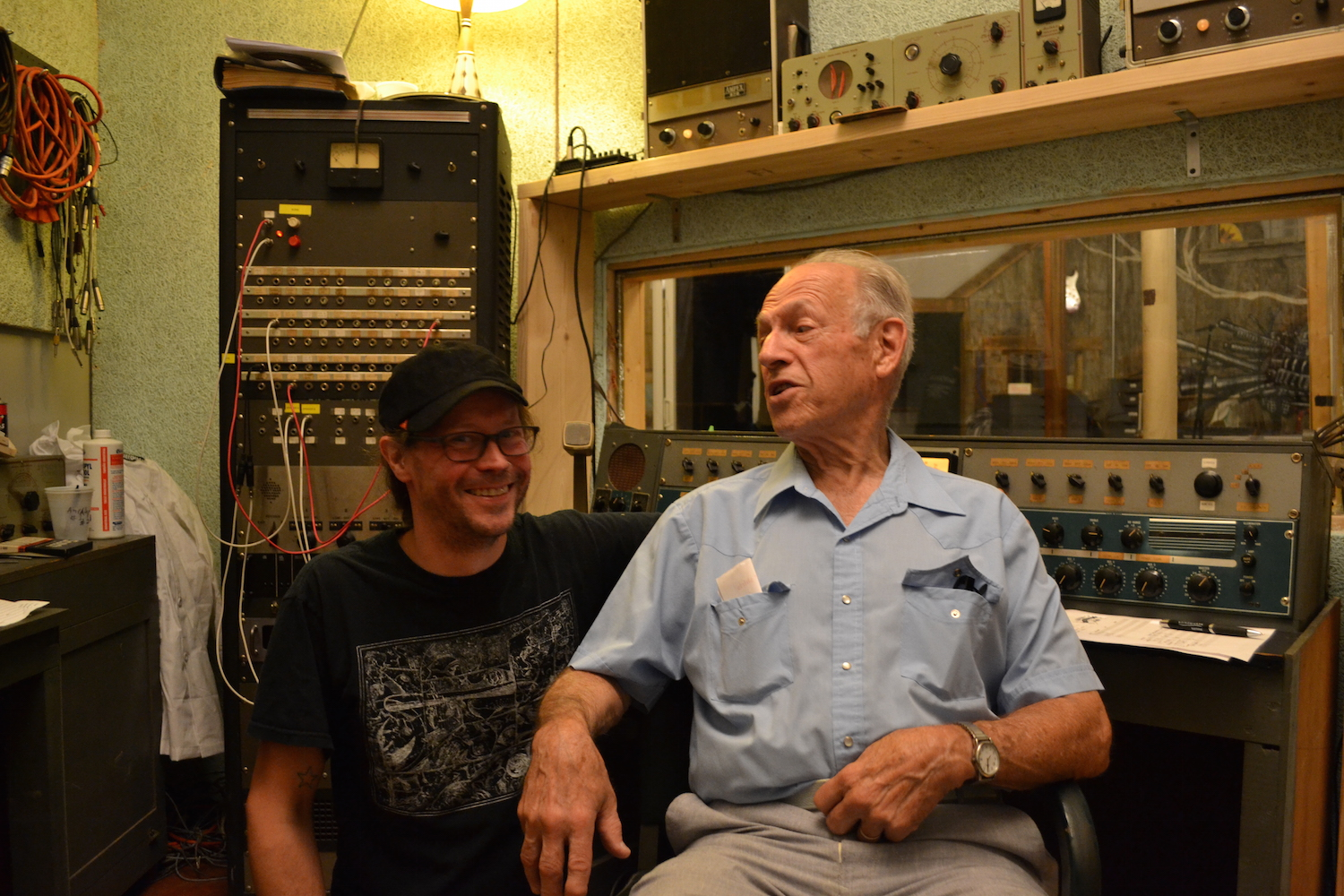
- Hawkes surrounded by his original recording equipment from Event Records

Background information
- Born: Allerton Hawkes; December 25, 1930; Providence, Rhode Island
- Origin: Westbrook, Maine
- Died: December 28, 2018 (aged 88) Westbrook, Maine
- Genres: Bluegrass, country
- Occupations: Singer, musician, producer
- Instruments: Guitar, mandolin
- Label: Event Records
- Website: http://www.alhawkes.com/

Al Hawkes (December 25, 1930 – December 28, 2018) was an American musician, founder of Event Records, and pioneer of the American bluegrass movement. He received state and national accolades, including being recognized as a member of the first generation of bluegrass musicians by the Bluegrass Music Hall of Fame and Museum in Kentucky.

== Biography ==
Hawkes was born in Providence, Rhode Island, but moved back to his family's homestead in Westbrook, Maine, when he was 10, in 1941.

His father helped him get hooked on southern hillbilly music by installing a radio with a long antenna that could pick up music from stations like WWVA, WCKY, WJJD, and WBT.

When he was thirteen, Hawkes's mother bought him a guitar and chord book, and his father soon gave him a Gibson A4 mandolin. Hawkes formed his first band (the Al Hawkes Hillbillies) as a high school sophomore. They played at local school functions and grange halls.

In the late 1940s, Hawkes built a pirate radio station broadcasting at 1210 KC on the AM dial, which he shut down in 1949 after the FCC learned of his illegal operation. He was soon broadcasting five days a week from WLAM radio in Lewiston, Maine.

In the 1940s, Hawkes performed as one half of the duo Allerton & Alton, the first interracial duo to play bluegrass. They performed live and on radio shows until 1951, despite the heavily segregated climate of the time.

In 1951, during the Korean War, Hawkes entered the Maine National Guard and was stationed in North Africa, where he was a disc jockey for Armed Forces Radio and performed for the troops. Here he had the opportunity to learn how to use up-to-date recording equipment. When he returned from North Africa, he went to Boston to attend the Massachusetts Radio and Broadcast School for two years, obtained his First Class Broadcast License, and graduated as an honor student.

In 1956, Hawkes formed Event Records, an independent label out of Westbrook, Maine, with Richard Greeley. Together, they recorded many high-profile artists, including Dick Curless, Hal Lone Pine, and Lenny Breau. Event Records operated until 1962, when the warehouse of its Boston distributor was destroyed by a fire and thousands of records were lost, putting the company out of business.

In 2010, Andrew Jawitz made a 47-minute documentary, The Eventful Life of Al Hawkes, which was broadcast on the Maine Public Broadcasting Network and shown locally.

In 2013, Todd Hutchisen of Acadia Recording Company (a small recording studio in Portland, Maine) purchased all of the original recording equipment from Event Records and relocated and repaired the 1/4” mono tape decks, Altec stereo mixing board, Ampex 350s, real tape delay, spring reverb, and original RCA, Shure, and EV microphones for use at Acadia. That equipment has been used to record several split 45-inch vinyl records with groups looking to recreate the iconic rockabilly sound.

After Event Records, Hawkes opened a TV repair shop at the same site as his recording studio. Its sign is now eligible for the National Register of Historic Places.

After his 80th birthday, then-Senator Olympia Snowe delivered a tribute to him in the Congressional Record, calling Hawkes "a Maine and national treasure."

Hawkes died on December 28, 2018, at the age of 88.

== Discography ==
Year	Album	Group	Notes
2004	Keep On Smiling	Al Hawkes	Featuring Fred Lantz, Al Doane, Alan Stapleford, Sean Mencher, Bob Boothby and Bruce Milliard
	Gettin' It All Together	Al Hawkes and His String Fusion	
1991	I'll Go Somewhere and Sing My Songs Again	Al Hawkes and the Nighthawkes	
1990	Old Time Pickin' and Singin'	Al Hawkes	
2014	I Love the State of Maine	Al Hawkes	
2011	Black White and Bluegrass	Allerton & Alton	Bear Family Records

== Event Records catalogue ==
	Artist	7" singles
4256	Charlie Bailey & His Happy Valley Boys	"Darling Nellie Across The Sea" / "The Memory of Your Smile"
4257	Hal "Lone Pine" and his Kountry Karavan	"Prince Edward Island Is Heaven To Me" / "Down By The Railroad Tracks"
4258	Dick Curless	"Foggy Foggy Dew" / "The Streets of Laredo"
4259	Johnny Copeland	"What Kind of Life" / "Radar"
4260	Harold Carter	"The Hot Mocking Bird" / "The German Waltz"
4261	Lilly Brothers	"Are You Tired Of Me My Darling" / "Tragic Romance"
4262	Sonny DeFreest & the Western Rhythm Boys	"Little Boy Blue" / "I've Been Hurt By Love Before"
4263	Clyde & Willy Joy	"From The Hills" / "Beautiful Heaven Up There"
4264	Ken Fairlie	"Tonight Is Just Another Night To Cry Myself To Sleep" / "The Table Turned"
4265	Pete Peterson	"Won't Cha" / "Don't Try"
4266	Dick Curless	"China Nights" / "Blues In My Mind"
4267	Slim Coxx & His Cowboy Caravan	"Sitting Here All Alone" / "Oh Golly, Gosh, Oh Gee"
4268	Curtis Johnson & The Windjammers	"Baby, Baby" / "Teenage Love Affair"
4269	Jimmy Copeland	"Jealous Hearted Me" / "Roses And Thorns"
4270	The Dreamers	"Rock & Roll Baby" / "Ding Dong"
4271	Javalans	"Come Dance With Me" / "Cynthia"
4272	Lilly Brothers	"John Henry" / "Bring Back My Blue Eyed Boy To Me"
4273	Danny & Audrey Harrison	"Rock-a-Billy Boogie" / "Let 'Em Talk"
4274	Dick Curless	"Nine Pound Hammer" / "You Never Miss The Water"
4275	Brice Sisters	"Your Jealous Mind" / "Please Understand"
4276	Pell Brothers	"Itch and Leave" / "Pretend"
4277	Johnny Houston	"Slick Chick" / "Playboy"
4278	Danny Harrison	"Mary Ann I'm Lonesome" / "Have You Ever Been Lonely"
4279	Statics	"The Day You Left Me" / "The Girl in My Dreams"
4280	Dick Curless	"Ragged But Right" / "I Ain't Got Nobody (And Nobody Cares For Me)"
4281	Curtis Johnson with the Windjammers	"Loverboy" / "Heading For The High School Hop"
4282	Curtis Johnson with the Windjammers	"Baby, Let's Play House" / "I Don't Care If The Sun Don't Shine"
4285	Velvets	"I" / "At Last"
4286	Herbie Lee III	"Champagne Charlene"
4287	Scarlets	"Dear One" / "I've Lost"
4288	Susan Capone	"Until The End of Time" / "I Understand"
4289	Ricky Coyne & His Guitar Rockers	"Rollin' Pin Mim" / I'll Love You Forever""
4290	The Della Sisters	"Can You?" / "Hesitate"
4291	Les Seevers & The Oaks	"Wooden Angels" / "Something Old, Something New"
4292	Arvaks	"Beautiful Child" / "Donne-Moi"
4293	Three Little Pigs	"Little Piggy Cha Cha Cha" / "Georgie Porgie Cha Cha Cha"
4294	Ricky Coyne and his Guitar Rockers	"I Want You To Know" / "Angel From Heaven"
4295	Scotty McKay	"Rollin' Dynamite" / "Evenin' Time"
4296	Paula Gay	"Hi Mr. Moon (Cha-Cha)" / "Where Is That Rainbow"
4297	Paul Champagne	"My Boy" / "When You're Away"
4298	Ricky Coyne and his Guitar Rockers	"Kaw-Liga" / "Little Darleen"
