= Live at Donte's (Lenny Breau album) =

Live album by Lenny Breau
- Released: April 4, 2000
- Recorded: May 1969
- Genre: Jazz
- Length: 59:15
- Label: String Jazz

Lenny Breau chronology
Boy Wonder (1998)	Live at Donte's (2000)	Pickin' Cotten (2001)

Live at Donte's is a live album by Canadian jazz guitarist Lenny Breau that was recorded in 1969 and released in 2000.

== Reception ==
Professional ratings
Review scores
Source	Rating
Allmusic	2.5/5 stars

Music critic Stephen Howell was critical of the poor recording and production in his review for Allmusic. Of the performance, he wrote the release "does showcase Breau's ability to make one guitar sound like two, due to his mix of classical, country, flamenco, and jazz roots that he incorporates into his fingerpicking style... If you're looking to purchase a live CD of Breau, however, it is recommended that you pick up The Velvet Touch of Lenny Breau, which has much better production."

== Track listing ==
1. "Too Close for Comfort" (Jerry Bock, George David Weiss, Larry Holofcener) – 5:31
2. "Time After Time" (Sammy Cahn, Jule Styne) – 7:27
3. "When I Fall in Love" (Victor Young, Edward Heyman) – 4:59
4. "Autumn Leaves" (Joseph Kosma, Johnny Mercer, Jacques Prévert) – 8:08
5. "All Blues" (Miles Davis) – 4:43
6. "Will You Still Be Mine?" (Adair, Dennis) – 8:02
7. "On Green Dolphin Street" (Bronisław Kaper, Ned Washington) – 6:53
8. "24/36 Blues" (Lenny Breau) – 2:29
9. "When I Fall in Love" (Young, Heyman) – 5:06
10. "Georgia on My Mind" (Hoagy Carmichael, Stuart Gorrell) –5:57

== Personnel ==
- Lenny Breau – guitar
- Dick Berk – drums
- Ray Neopolitan – bass
