= Bringing It All Back Home (disambiguation) =

Bringing It All Back Home is a 1965 Bob Dylan studio album.

Bringing It All Back Home may also refer to:

== Books and TV ==
- Bringing It All Back Home (play), a 1969 play by Terrence McNally
- Bringing It All Back Home (TV series), a television series produced by Irish musician Philip King
- Bringing It All Back Home, a book by British writer Ian Clayton

== Music ==
- Bringing It All Back Home, a 1991 album by Irish fiddle player Gerry O'Connor
- Bringing It All Back Home – Again, a 1999 EP by American psychedelic rock band Brian Jonestown Massacre
- Bringin' It All Back Home (Johnny Copeland album), 1985
