= Flyin' High (Johnny Copeland album) =

Studio album by Johnny Copeland
- Released: 1992
- Recorded: 1991
- Label: Gitanes; Verve
- Producer: Johnny Copeland, John Hahn

Johnny Copeland chronology
| When the Rain Starts Fallin' (1990) | Flyin' High (1992) | Catch Up with the Blues (1994) |

Flyin' High is an album by the American musician Johnny Copeland, released in 1992. Copeland supported the album with a North American tour.

== Production ==
Produced by Copeland and John Hahn, the album was recorded in Brussels, Belgium, and New York City. Copeland used a Gibson guitar instead of his usual Peavey. He duetted with Dr. John on the cover of Hank Williams's "Jambalaya (On the Bayou)"; Dr. John played piano on "Circumstances". Buckwheat Zydeco played accordion on "Love Song". Hank Crawford, David "Fathead" Newman, and the Uptown Horns contributed to the album; Copeland became fond of using horns on blues songs after picking up Albert Collins's band, in 1953. Joe Hughes, Copeland's early mentor, also played guitar on Flyin' High. "Thigpen (Cornball)" is an instrumental song.

== Critical reception ==
Professional ratings
Review scores
| Source | Rating |
|---|---|
| AllMusic | 2/5 stars |
| MusicHound Blues: The Essential Album Guide | 3.5/5 stars |
| The Virgin Encyclopedia of the Blues | 3/5 stars |

The Washington Post wrote that the album "boasts strong original songs, smart horn charts, guest stars who came to work rather than schmooze and performances that look forward rather than backward." The Sun-Sentinel deemed the album "sweet and sassy, low and laid back." The Pittsburgh Post-Gazette noted that the songs "showcase Copeland's impressive command of the nuances of working-class misery, pride and romance." The Herald-Sun opined that the album "partakes too fully of the slicker and more superficial rhythm and blues influences that have adulterated the blues in recent years." The Chicago Tribune included Flyin' High on its list of the 14 best blues albums of 1993.

AllMusic wrote that "Copeland was at his best on tunes where the emphasis was on style rather than lyric meaning and elaboration."

== Track listing ==
| No. | Title | Length |
|---|---|---|
| 1. | "Flyin' High (Yesterday)" |
| 2. | "Hooked, Hog-tied & Collared" |
| 3. | "Greater Man" |
| 4. | "Jambalaya (On the Bayou)" |
| 5. | "San Antone" |
| 6. | "Thigpen (Cornball)" |
| 7. | "Promised Myself" |
| 8. | "Love Song" |
| 9. | "Circumstances" |
| 10. | "Around the World" |
