= Flying High =

Flying High or Flyin' High may refer to:

== Film, television and theatre ==
- Flying High (musical), a 1930 Broadway musical
- Flying High (1926 film), an American silent film directed by Charles Hutchison
- Flying High (1931 film), an MGM adaptation of the Broadway musical, produced by George White
- Flying High! or Airplane!, a 1980 satirical comedy film
- Flying High (TV series), a 1978–1979 American comedy-drama series

== Music ==
=== Albums ===
- Flyin' High (Blackfoot album), 1976
- Flyin' High (Johnny Copeland album), 1992
- Flyin' High (Wink album), 1995
- Flying High (album), a 1992 album by The Irresistible Force
- Flying High, a 2009 album by Ali Campbell
- Flying High (EP), a 2023 EP by the Alchemist

=== Songs ===
- "Flying High" (Country Joe and the Fish song), 1967
- "Flyin' High (In the Friendly Sky)", a 1971 song by Marvin Gaye
- "Flying High" (Commodores song), a 1978 song by the Commodores from Natural High
- "Flying High" (Freeez song), 1981
- "Flyin' High", a song by Krokus from Heart Attack, 1988
- "Flying High" (Captain Hollywood Project song), 1994
- "Flying High" (Jem), 2004
- "Flying High" (Chipmunk song), 2010
- "Flying High", a song by ZZ Top from their 2012 album La Futura
- "Flying High", a song by Travis Scott from Rodeo, 2015
- "Flying High", a song by Band-Maid from Conqueror, 2019

== Other uses ==
- Flying High Bird Sanctuary, Queensland, Australia

== See also ==
- Fly High (disambiguation)
