= Chance Meeting =

Chance Meeting may refer to:

- Chance Meeting (1954 film), British Cold War drama, a/k/a The Young Lovers
- Chance Meeting (1959 film), British murder mystery, a/k/a Blind Date
- "Chance Meeting", song by Roxy Music on 1972's Roxy Music (album)
- Chance Meeting (album), 1997 release of 1980 concert by Tal Farlow and Lenny Breau

== See also ==
- Chance Meeting on a Dissecting Table of a Sewing Machine and an Umbrella, 1979 debut album by English band Nurse with Wound
