= Cecil Null =

American songwriter (1927–2001)

Cecil Allen Null
- Born: April 26, 1927; East War, West Virginia, U.S.
- Died: August 26, 2001 (aged 74) Bristol, Tennessee, U.S.
- Genres: Country, Bluegrass
- Occupations: Songwriter, autoharp player
- Instruments: Autoharp, vocals
- Years active: 1940s–2001

Cecil Allen Null (April 26, 1927 – August 26, 2001) was an American songwriter. He began writing songs and singing publicly while serving in the Navy during World War II. After leaving the service, he performed with various groups on radio stations in Bristol, Virginia. He wrote the songs "I Forgot More Than You'll Ever Know" and "I Found Out More Than You Ever Knew", which became 1953 hits for The Davis Sisters and Betty Cody, respectively. On December 5, 1953, both songs were listed in the top ten of Billboard Hot Country Songs chart.

Null became an expert at playing and designing autoharps, and ultimately served as a consultant for a manufacturer of the instrument.

== Biography ==
Cecil Null was born in East War, West Virginia. Following his death from cancer on August 26, 2001, he was buried at Glenwood Cemetery in Bristol, Tennessee.

== Songs ==
- "I Forgot More Than You'll Ever Know" (1953)
- "I Found Out More Than You Ever Knew" (1953)
- "Close Your Eyes (And I'll Be There)"
- "Love Isn't Love (Until You Give it Away)" (Cecil Null & E. C. Chance)
- "Mother Maybelle" 1964.
- "She's Hungry Again" Recorded by Bill Philips (1970)
