= Brad Terry =

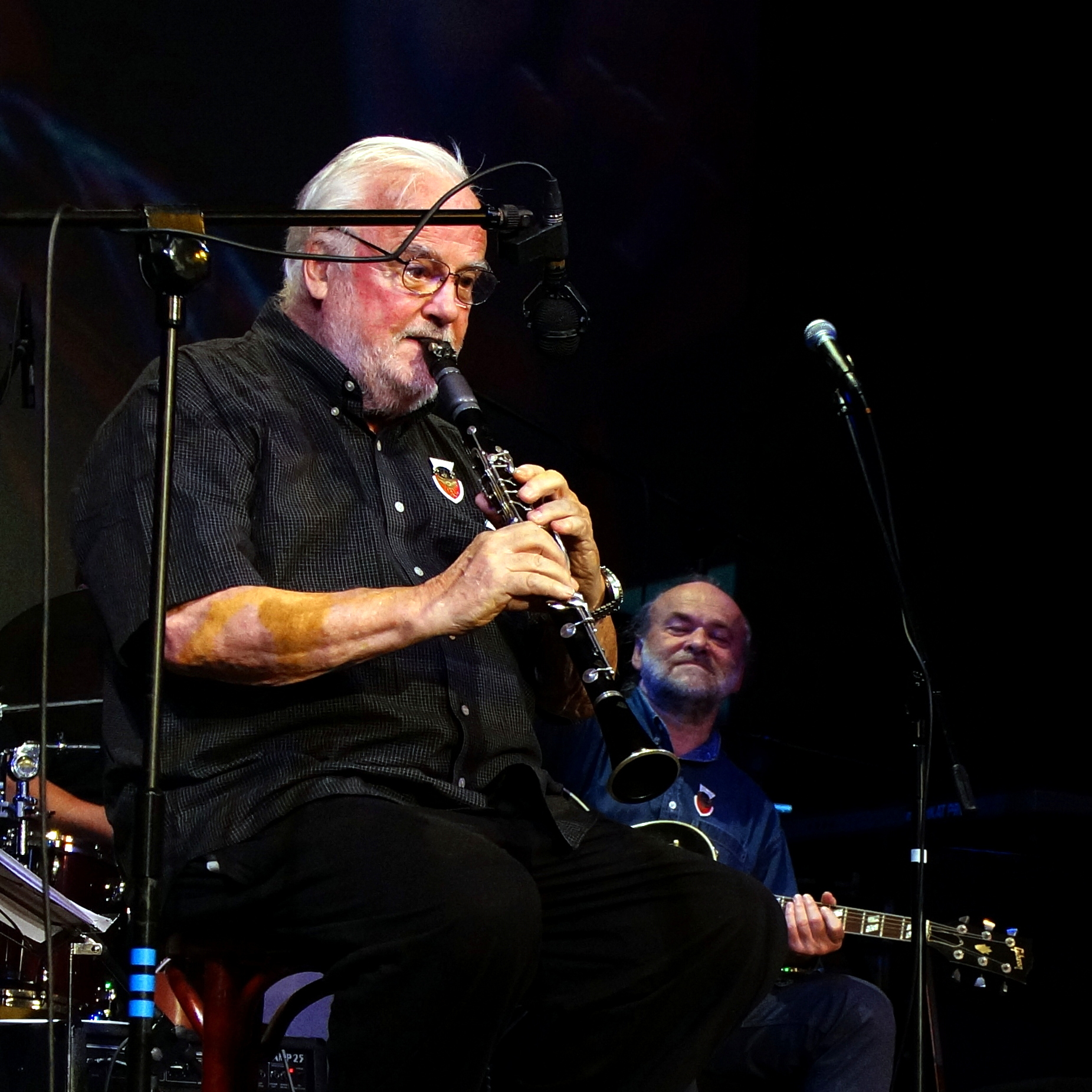

Background information
- Born: June 9, 1937 (age 89); Stamford, Connecticut, USA
- Genres: Jazz
- Occupation: Musician
- Instrument: Clarinet

Brad Terry (born June 9, 1937) is an American jazz clarinetist and whistler.

== Early life ==
Terry was born on June 9th, 1937 in Stamford, Connecticut. He was raised in both New London, Connecticut and North Stamford, Connecticut. According to his older brother, Terry was a whistler as a young boy. At 13, he got into clarinet due to his mother, who was offered to get him one as Terry already played the recorder. He learned the clarinet due to the pitch rather than finger movement.

Benny Goodman, Eddie Daniels, and Buddy DeFranco are some of his inspirations. Goodman was a neighbor of Terry when he lived in Connecticut.

== Career ==
He recorded the albums The Living Room Tapes, Vol. 1 and The Living Room Tapes, Vol. 2 with guitarist Lenny Breau between October 1978 and January 1982. Terry released the albums in 1986 and 1990 respectively after Breau's death in 1984. He has played with Buck Clayton, Dizzy Gillespie, Roger Kellaway, Red Mitchell, Steve Swallow, and Buddy Tate and has taught workshops in Poland.

In 2015, Terry wrote a book called "I Feel More Like I Do Now That I Did Yesterday" about his personal life. He has ADD and dyslexia.

Terry currently lives in Bath, Maine. For the past 25 years, Terry made a six-week summer camp in Maine where he picked 16 boys to learn and practice music.

== Discography ==
- The Living Room Tapes, Vol. 1 (Livingroom, 1986)
- The Living Room Tapes, Vol. 2 (Musical Heritage Society, 1990)
- Brad Terry, John Basile – Duo (Jazz Heritage, 1991)
- Brad Terry Featuring Jarek Śmietana* – Brad Terry Plays Ellington (Starling S.A., 1997)
- Brad Terry & Joachim Mencel – All About Spring (Art Of Life Records, 2003)
- Remember by The Steve Grover Quartet featuring Brad Terry (Young Grover Music, 2006)
- Brad Terry & Joachim Mencel – Live In Fort Andross (Inspirafon, 2009)
- Brad Terry Plays Gershwin Featuring Jarek Śmietana (Medialogic, 2011)
- The Nashville Sessions (Ear Up Records, 2025)

== Video ==
- Lenny Breau & Brad Terry – Live At The Maine Festival (Art Of Life Records, 2009)

== Bibliography ==
- Terry, Brad (2015). I Feel More Like I Do Now Than I Did Yesterday (A Collection of Remembered Stories). ISBN 978-1329099579.
