= The Lenny Breau Show =

- Genre: Variety
- Presented by: Lenny Breau
- Country of origin: Canada
- Original language: English
- No. of seasons: 1

Production
- Production location: Winnipeg
- Running time: 30 minutes

Original release
- Network: CBC Television
- Release: 12 August – 9 September 1966

The Lenny Breau Show is a Canadian music variety television program that aired on CBC Television in 1966.

== Premise ==
Jazz guitarist Lenny Breau hosted this Winnipeg-produced series with Bob McMullin's house band.

== Scheduling ==
This half-hour series was broadcast on Fridays at 8:00 p.m. from 12 August, to 9 September 1966.
