= When Lightn' Strikes =

Studio album by Lenny Breau
- Released: 1982
- Recorded: August 12 & 25, 1982
- Studio: Audio Media Studios, Nashville, Tennessee
- Genre: Jazz
- Length: 35:49
- Label: Tudor
- Producer: Paul Whitehead

Lenny Breau chronology
Mo' Breau (1981)	When Lightn' Strikes (1982)	Legacy (1984)

When Lightn' Strikes is an album by Canadian guitarist Lenny Breau that was released in 1982. It was remastered and reissued in 2005 by Art of Life Records as Swingin' on a Seven-String.

== History ==
When Lightn' Strikes was the last studio album Breau recorded before he was killed in 1984. It contains the only studio recordings of Breau on his seven-string guitar. Besides the seven-string, Breau also played classical guitar on the album. There are five duets with bassist Jim Ferguson. Breau and pedal steel player Buddy Emmons had previously recorded together on Minors Aloud.

Originally released on LP in 1982 by the small Tudor Records label, it had neither liner notes nor personnel listed. Tudor ceased business shortly after its release and it quickly went out of print. It was remastered and reissued in 2005 on the Art of Life Records label as Swingin' on a Seven-String with an altered track sequence and one bonus track. The reissue includes a booklet with liner notes by Ron Forbes-Roberts and notes by musicians Ferguson, Emmons, and Kenny Malone.

== Reception ==
Professional ratings
Review scores
Source	Rating
AllMusic	4.5/5 stars
AllMusic	4.5/5 stars

Writing for AllMusic, music critic Paul Kohler called the album "A lost gem!" In reviewing the reissue for JazzTimes, critic Russell Carlson wrote "Breau created an ambiguous fusion of jazz and country on Swingin', nimbly ducking in and out of pedal-steel guitarist Buddy Emmons' syrupy, starlit melodies while coasting along with drummer Kenny Malone's and bassist Jim Ferguson's straightahead swing propulsion... Breau's mastery of an impressionistic Bill Evans style has him pulling ideas and emotion from country music that a pure honky-tonker could never realize." John Kelman of All About Jazz praised the album and called Breau "a bolt of lightning when he emerged in the '70s out of Manitoba, Canada". Of the album, Kelman wrote: "Breau may not have broken any turf in terms of pushing jazz out of the mainstream, but his interpretive skills and ability to retain a tune's essence while reimagining it in a pure jazz context remains evocative to this day. For those unfamiliar with Breau's magic, Swingin' on a Seven-String is a perfect place to start." Scott Yanow reviewed the reissue, giving it 4.5 of 5 stars and writing " It is a long-overdue joy to have this highly enjoyable music available again, and it is highly recommended to anyone at all interested in Lenny Breau's artistry."

== Track listing ==
1. "Anytime" (Herbert "Happy" Lawson) – 3:41
2. "I Can't Help It If I'm Still In Love With You" (Hank Williams) – 3:31
3. "You Needed Me" (Randy Goodrum) – 3:20
4. "She Thinks I Still Care" (Dickey Lee) – 3:17
5. "Please Release Me" (Eric Horton, Sean Peck) – 4:23
6. "Blue Moon Of Kentucky" (Bill Monroe) – 2:12
7. "I Love You Because" (Leon Payne) – 4:10
8. "Bonaparte's Retreat" (Pee Wee King, Redd Stewart) – 2:58
9. "Back in Indiana" (James F. Hanley, Ballard MacDonald) – 3:59
10. "I'm So Lonesome I Could Cry" (Williams) – 4:18
  2005 reissue bonus track:
11. "Blue Eyes Cryin' in the Rain" (Fred Rose) – 3:17

== Personnel ==
- Lenny Breau – guitar
- Buddy Emmons – pedal steel guitar
- Jim Ferguson – bass
- Kenny Malone – drums
