= Live at Bourbon St. =

Live album by Lenny Breau
- Released: 1995
- Recorded: June 14, 1983
- Venue: Toronto, Ontario, Canada
- Genre: Jazz
- Length: 124:02
- Label: Guitarchives

Lenny Breau chronology
The Living Room Tapes, Vol. 2 (1990)	Live at Bourbon St. (1995)	Chance Meeting (1997)

Live at Bourbon St. is a live album by guitarist Lenny Breau and bassist Dave Young that was released in 1995. It was nominated for a 1997 Juno Award in the category of Best Mainstream Jazz Album.

Recorded live by Ted O'Reilly on June 14, 1983. Many of the tracks were released on LP in 1984 and 1985 as Legacy and Quietude respectively, with "Sparkle Dust" (from "Legacy") omitted from this CD release. The original tapes were remastered and reissued on this two-disc release. Previously unreleased songs "All The Things You Are", "My Foolish Heart", "My Funny Valentine", "There Will Never Be Another You", and "Riot-chorus" from the live performance are included.

== Reception ==
Professional ratings
Review scores
Source	Rating
Allmusic	5/5 stars

Writing for Allmusic, critic Scott Yanow gave the album 5 out of 5 stars and wrote: "The music (full of close musical communication) is subtle and quiet yet consistently inventive. It is obvious after a few minutes of listening that Breau had complete control of his guitar and an original voice of his own.... Overall this two-fer gives one a definitive portrait of the nearly forgotten legend."

== Track listing ==
1. "There Is No Greater Love" (Isham Jones, Marty Sykes) – 6:38
2. "If You Could See Me Now" (Tadd Dameron, Carl Sigman) – 5:49
3. "On Green Dolphin Street" (Bronisław Kaper, Ned Washington) – 8:35
4. "Summertime" (George Gershwin, Ira Gershwin, Washington) – 6:37
5. "Quiet and Blue" (Lenny Breau) – 2:45
6. "All Blues" (Miles Davis) – 7:36
7. "I Fall in Love Too Easily" (Sammy Cahn, Jule Styne) – 6:45
8. "All the Things You Are" (Oscar Hammerstein II, Jerome Kern) – 9:04
9. "My Foolish Heart" (Washington, Victor Young) – 7:42
10. "Vision" (McCoy Tyner) – 13:26
11. "Blues in My Case" (Lenny Breau, Dave Young) – 5:21
12. "My Funny Valentine" (Lorenz Hart, Richard Rodgers) – 10:32
13. "What Is This Thing Called Love?" (Cole Porter) – 7:18
14. "Beautiful Love" (Haven Gillespie, Wayne King, Egbert Van Alstyne, Victor Young) – 8:14
15. "Two Lonely People" (Bill Evans) – 8:04
16. "There Will Never Be Another You" (Mack Gordon, Harry Warren) – 8:57
17. "Riot-chous" (Boots Randolph, Hank Garland) – 2:43

== Personnel ==
- Lenny Breau – guitar
- David Young – bass

Production notes:

- Randy Bachman – executive producer
- Ted O'Reilly – engineer
- Dave Jewer – digital mastering, art direction, design
- Danny Casavant – research
- Barry Thomson – photography
- Colin Wiebe – art direction, design
