= The Velvet Touch of Lenny Breau – Live! =

The Velvet Touch of Lenny Breau - Live!

Live album by Lenny Breau
- Released: 1969
- Recorded: April 28–30, 1969
- Venue: Shelly's Manne-Hole, Hollywood, California
- Genre: Jazz
- Length: 46:56
- Label: RCA Victor
- Producer: Danny Davis, Ronny Light

Lenny Breau chronology
Guitar Sounds from Lenny Breau (1969)	The Velvet Touch of Lenny Breau - Live! (1969)	Minors Aloud (1978)

The Velvet Touch of Lenny Breau – Live! is a live album by Canadian jazz guitarist Lenny Breau that was released in 1969.

== History ==
After Breau's major-label debut, Guitar Sounds from Lenny Breau, was issued the previous year on RCA, producer Chet Atkins arranged for this live recording in Los Angeles, accompanied by fellow Winnipegers Ron Halldorson and Reg Kelln. Carol Kaye was in the audience and stated in an interview:

"If you had dropped a bomb on the place that night you'd have wiped out all the guitar players in the world. They were all down there, from Howard Roberts to George Van Eps to Joe Pass... He conquered Hollywood because we all loved him as a player and we loved him as a person."

The tapes from the three-night engagement were taken back to Nashville where Atkins, Danny Davis and Ronnie Light prepared them for release.

Despite the enthusiasm for the live show, the album sold poorly and was barely mentioned in the music press at the time. Breau was later quoted as saying, "When I initially recorded, I didn't feel ready—I wanted to practice for another 10 years first." He also felt RCA did not sufficiently promote the release. It was 10 years before Breau released another solo album.

== Reception ==
Professional ratings
Review scores
Source	Rating
Allmusic	3.5/5 stars

Music critic Paul Kohler of Allmusic wrote "His ability to play chords, melody, and a bass line simultaneously has to be heard to be believed."

== Track listing ==
Writing credits as shown on record label.

1. "Tuning Time" (Lenny Breau) – 1:49
2. "No Greater Love" (Isham Jones, Marty Symes) – 6:37
3. "The Claw" (Jerry Reed) – 4:23
4. "Indian Reflections for Ravi" (Breau) – 3:12
5. "That's All" (Merle Travis) – 5:42
6. "Blues Theme" (Breau) – 1:01
7. "Mercy, Mercy, Mercy" (Joe Zawinul) – 5:30
8. "Spanjazz" (Breau) – 5:19
9. "Bluesette" (Jean Thielemans) – 6:00
10. "A Taste of Honey" (Ric Marlow, Bobby Scott) – 4:43
11. "Blues Theme No. 2" (Breau) – 2:40

== Personnel ==
- Lenny Breau – 6-string and 12-string guitar
- Ronnie Halldorson – bass
- Reg Kelln – drums

== Production notes ==
- Grover Helsley – engineer
- Danny Davis – engineer
- Ronnie Light – engineer
