= Ron Halldorson =

Canadian musician and music producer

Ron Halldorson (born 1943) is a Canadian jazz musician, arranger, and producer from Winnipeg, Manitoba, best known for his work with guitarist Lenny Breau. Beginning his career as a country musician in the 1950s, Halldorson switched to jazz in the 1960s and played bass in The Lenny Breau Trio, recording Guitar Sounds from Lenny Breau and The Velvet Touch of Lenny Breau – Live! on RCA and recording with John Capek in 1976. After playing double-bass with Breau for 10 years, Halldorson worked as a session musician, playing pedal steel guitar and other instruments on recordings by The Guess Who, Wyrd Sisters and others. During the 1980s and 90s, he composed music for a number of film and television shows. In 2018 Ron released an album called Happy Talk with Julian Bradford on bass. In 2019, he released the album Duologue also with Julian Bradford.

In 2001, Halldorson received the CanWest Global Jazz Award for lifetime achievement in jazz.
