= Five O'Clock Bells =

Studio album by Lenny Breau
- Released: 1979
- Recorded: October–November 1977, January 1978
- Studio: Blank Tape Recording Studio, New York City
- Genre: Jazz
- Length: 38:26
- Label: Adelphi
- Producer: Dan Doyle; Gene Rosenthal

Lenny Breau chronology
Minors Aloud (1978)	Five O'Clock Bells (1979)	Lenny Breau (1979)

Five O'Clock Bells is a studio album by Canadian jazz guitarist Lenny Breau that was released in 1979.

== History ==
After signing a three-album deal with Gene Rosenthal for Adelphi Records, Breau recorded enough material for this over a few months in 1977. Rosenthal produced the first sessions which would become Five O'Clock Bells. Subsequent releases from these sessions were Mo' Breau and Last Sessions.

Originally released on LP in 1979, it was reissued in 1987 on the Genes label and again reissued along with Mo' Breau.

== Reception ==
Professional ratings
Review scores
Source	Rating
Allmusic	4.5/5 stars
DownBeat	4/5 stars

In his review for Allmusic, music critic Michael G. Nastos wrote "Guitar students, this is your homework — find this album."

DownBeat assigned the album 4 stars. Reviewer Douglas Clark wrote, "This is an unusual album. Maybe it’s eccentric, and its certainly idiosyncratic, but it’s worth hearing for Breau’s homespun approach and techniques".

== Track listing ==
1. "Days of Wine and Roses" (Henry Mancini) – 4:37
2. "Toronto" (Lenny Breau) – 5:46
3. "Amy (For Cinde)" (Breau) – 2:26
4. "Other Places, Other Times" (Breau) – 4:22
5. "Five O'Clock Bells" (Breau) – 3:15
6. "Little Blues" (Breau) – 3:44
7. "My Funny Valentine" (Richard Rodgers) – 6:12
8. "Visions" (McCoy Tyner) – 6:08

== Personnel ==
- Lenny Breau – guitar, vocals on "Five O'Clock Bells"
