= I Found Out More Than You Ever Knew =

Single by Betty Cody
- B-side: "Don't Believe Everything That You Read About Love"
- Released: 1952
- Genre: country
- Length: 3:03
- Label: RCA
- Songwriter(s): Cecil Null

"I Found Out More Than You Ever Knew (About Him)" is a country and western song written by Cecil Null. Recorded by Betty Cody in 1952, the RCA release reached the top ten on the Billboard Country Chart. It was the answer record to the Davis Sisters' 1952 country hit I Forgot More Than You'll Ever Know.
