= Texas Twister (album) =

1984 album by Johnny Copeland

Compilation album by Johnny Copeland
- Released: 1984
- Genre: Blues
- Label: Demon

Johnny Copeland chronology
Make My Home Where I Hang My Hat (1982)	Texas Twister (1984)	Bringin' It All Back Home (1985)

Texas Twister is an album by the American musician Johnny Copeland. It was released in 1984 on Demon Records in the United Kingdom, and Black & Blue Records in France. A CD with additional songs was released on Rounder Records in Canada in 1986. It is a compilation of four albums Copeland recorded for Rounder Records. It was produced by Dan Doyle. It was engineered by Michael Finlayson, who also played percussion. It was recorded at Unique Recording, New York City.

The album featured Copeland on guitar and vocals.

Stevie Ray Vaughan appears on the tracks "Don't Stop by the Creek, Son" and "When the Rain Starts Fallin'," on the Demon and Black and Blues releases. The latter does not appear on the 1986 CD release.

Other musicians appearing on the album include: Sam Furnace (alto saxophone & baritone saxophone), Brian Miller (bass), Jimmy Wormworth (drums on tracks 1, 3, 6, 7, 8, 9), Julian Vaughan (drums on tracks 2, 4, 5), Ken Vangel (piano), Joel Perry (rhythm guitar), Bert McGowan (tenor saxophone), George Lewis (trombone), Ben Bierman (trumpet), and John Pratt (trumpet).

== Critical reception ==
Professional ratings
Review scores
Source	Rating
AllMusic	4.5/5 stars
The Encyclopedia of Popular Music	3/5 stars
The Penguin Guide to Blues Recordings	4/4 stars
The Philadelphia Inquirer	3/5 stars

The Washington Post wrote that the album "reasserts Copeland's prowess as a harsh blues shouter and earns him new respect as a songwriter". The Philadelphia Inquirer noted that "the playing is terrific—the presence of the tough horn section accentuates the asperity in Copeland's voice."

== Track listing ==
(on the 1984 Demon and Black and Blues releases)

1. "Midnight Fantasy"
2. "North Carolina"
3. "Don't Stop by the Creek, Son" (feat. Stevie Ray Vaughan)
4. "Excuses"
5. "Jessanne"
6. "Houston"
7. "When the Rain Starts Fallin'" (feat. Stevie Ray Vaughan)
8. "I De Go Now"
9. "Early in the Mornin'"

(on the 1986 Rounder release)

1. "Everybody Wants a Piece of Me"
2. "Copeland Special"
3. "It's My Own Tears"
4. "Claim Jumper"
5. "Natural Born Believer"
6. "Cold Outside"
7. "Honky Tonkin'"
8. "Love Utopia"
9. "Don't Stop by the Creek, Son" (feat. Stevie Ray Vaughan)
10. "Houston"
11. "I De Go Now"
12. "Excuses"
13. "Ngote"
14. "Kasavubu"
15. "Abidjan"

Note: An album with the same name (and cover) appears on the johnnycopeland.com website, but with completely different tracks listed and stating it was released in 1983.
