= Pickin' Cotten =

Live album by Lenny Breau and Richard Cotten
- Released: 2001
- Recorded: September 23–24, 1977
- Venue: Blue Bird, Nashville, Tennessee
- Genre: Jazz
- Label: Guitarchives

Lenny Breau chronology
Live at Donte's (2000)	Pickin' Cotten (2001)	The Hallmark Sessions (2003)

Pickin' Cotten is a live album by guitarists Lenny Breau and Richard Cotten that was recorded in 1977 and released in 2001.

Cotten taped a weekend show at the Bluebird Cafe and, after his death, his wife gave the tapes to Randy Bachman of Guitarchives Records.

== Reception ==
Professional ratings
Review scores
Source	Rating
Allmusic	4/5 stars
JazzTimes	(favorable)

In his review for Allmusic, music critic Dave Nathan describes Breau's "transformation of Bill Evans' piano technique to the guitar." In reviewing the release for JazzTimes, critic Jim Ferguson wrote "This isn't a flawless recording: there's a modicum of tape hiss and fretboard/ string clicks in the background. Moreover, Breau stumbles at times, although his stumbles are frequently better than most players' best efforts, and Cotten's contributions are workmanlike, resulting in little interplay. That having been said, the sound is clear, with Breau's occasional grunts and groans attesting to the relaxed setting and receptive audience that no doubt contained many Nashville pickers looking for a guitar lesson... Lenny's playing, though, was never standard. Throughout, he conjures many of the stylistic trademarks that have made him a veritable legend among guitarists: unique extended chord voicings, rippling octave harmonics and virtuosic single-note lines."

== Track listing ==
1. "On Green Dolphin St." (Bronisław Kaper, Ned Washington) – 7:59
2. "I Love You" (Cole Porter) – 8:15
3. "Emily" (Johnny Mandel, Johnny Mercer) – 5:12
4. "Scrapple from the Apple" (Charlie Parker) – 6:41
5. "Autumn Leaves" (Joseph Kosma, Johnny Mercer) – 7:20
6. "La Funkallero" (Bill Evans) – 7:20
7. "Stella by Starlight" (Victor Young, Ned Washington) – 3:37
  1. "Lenny Tuning His Guitar" - 0:47
  2. "The Two Lonely People" - 5:09 (Bill Evans)
  3. "Nardis" - 6:22 (Miles Davis)
8. "Lenny and Richard Remembered" (Spoken Word by Darci Cotten) – 6:53

== Personnel ==
- Lenny Breau – guitar
- Richard Cotten – bass

Production notes:

- Randy Bachman – executive producer, liner notes
- Jamie Sitar – mastering
- John Malcolm – graphic design
