= The Living Room Tapes, Vol. 2 =

The Living Room Tapes, Volume 2

Studio album by Lenny Breau & Brad Terry
- Released: 1990
- Recorded: October 1978 – January 1982
- Studio: Maine
- Genre: Jazz
- Length: 66:37
- Label: Musical Heritage Society
- Producer: Brad Terry

Lenny Breau & Brad Terry chronology
Last Sessions (1988)	The Living Room Tapes, Volume 2 (1990)	Live at Bourbon St. (1995)

The Living Room Tapes, Volume 2 is an album by Canadian jazz guitarist Lenny Breau and clarinetist Brad Terry that was released in 1990.

== History ==
Both solo and duet performances are included in these sessions. They were recorded at the home of Brad Terry in Maine on an informal basis, although both Breau and Terry had discussed commercially releasing the recordings. They were released by Terry after Breau's death.

== Reception ==
Professional ratings
Review scores
Source	Rating
Allmusic	4.5/5 stars

Writing for Allmusic, critic Scott Yanow wrote in his review: "A great guitarist who was very versatile (jazz, country, rock) yet very underrated, the late Lenny Breau was at his best in informal settings where he could stretch out... These well-recorded selections feature Breau at his best... Easily recommended to Lenny Breau fans and listeners wanting to discover a major guitarist."

== Reissues ==
- The Living Room Tapes, Vol. 2 was remastered and reissued with additional tracks from The Living Room Tapes, Vol. 1 in 2004 by Art of Life Records as The Complete Living Room Tapes.

== Track listing ==
1. "I Fall in Love Too Easily" (Sammy Cahn, Jule Styne) – 4:57
2. "Send in the Clowns" (Stephen Sondheim) – 3:44
3. "Nine Pound Hammer" (Merle Travis) – 2:30
4. "Cannonball Rag" (Travis) – 1:27
5. "Flamenco" – 5:13
6. "It Could Happen to You" (Johnny Burke, Jimmy Van Heusen) – 7:05
7. "Visions" (McCoy Tyner) – 6:08
8. "Remembering the Rain" (Bill Evans) – 6:23
9. "Autumn Leaves" (Johnny Mercer, Joseph Kosma) – 7:33
10. "Indiana" (James F. Hanley, Ballard MacDonald) – 6:04
11. "Stella by Starlight" (Victor Young, Ned Washington) – 7:14
12. "Emily" (Johnny Mercer, Johnny Mandel) – 8:19

== Personnel ==
- Lenny Breau – guitar
- Brad Terry – clarinet
