= Don Francks =

Canadian actor and jazz musician (1932–2016)

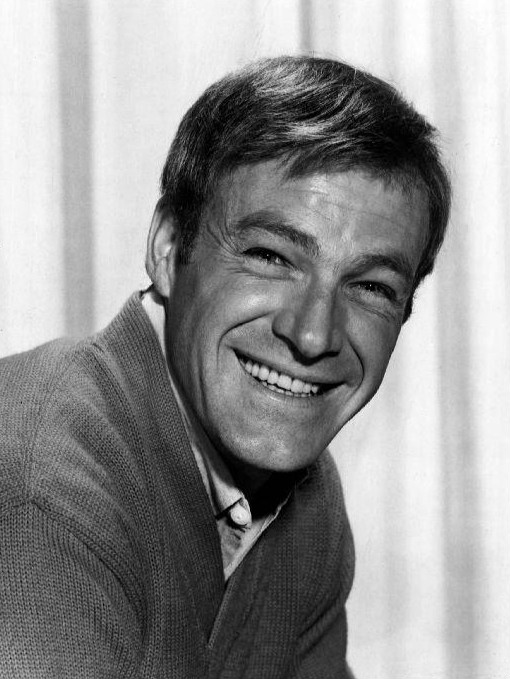
- Francks in 1966
- Born: February 28, 1932; Burnaby, British Columbia, Canada
- Died: April 3, 2016 (aged 84); Toronto, Ontario, Canada
- Other name: Iron Buffalo
- Occupations: Actor, musician, singer
- Years active: 1954–2016
- Spouses: Nancy Sue Johnson (m. 1962; div. 1967) Lili Clark (m. 1968)
- Children: 5, including Cree Summer and Rainbow Sun Francks

Don Harvey Francks (February 28, 1932 – April 3, 2016), also known by his stage name Iron Buffalo, was a Canadian actor, musician and singer.

== Early life ==
Don Harvey Francks was born on February 28, 1932, and was adopted shortly after his birth. His mother worked at a music store and his father was an electrician. As a child, he performed on Vancouver radio doing imitations of singers. After dropping out of high school at age 15, he worked in several jobs.

== Career ==
=== Acting ===
Francks's acting career began with CBC Television as a regular on Burns Chuckwagon from the Stampede Corral (1955–55) and Riding High (1955), then in the drama The Fast Ones (1959). In 1957 he had a part in the US series The Adventures of Tugboat Annie (actually filmed in Toronto, Ontario), then back to Canada in 1958 for Cannonball and Long Shot (1959). In 1959–60 he starred in the CBC-TV series R.C.M.P., playing Constable Bill Mitchell.

During the 1960s, Francks had roles on several US television shows including Mission: Impossible, Jericho, The Man from U.N.C.L.E., The Wild Wild West, and Mannix.

On February 16, 1965, he appeared on Broadway in the title role of the musical Kelly, as a daredevil planning to jump off the Brooklyn Bridge. The show was the first on Broadway in a generation to close on opening night after trying out in Philadelphia and Boston and playing five previews in New York. In addition to Kelly, Francks appeared in a 1965 Off-Broadway production, Leonard Bernstein's Theatre Songs.

In 1968, he co-starred with Fred Astaire and Petula Clark in the film version of Finian's Rainbow as Woody, his best-known movie role.

Francks narrated This Land (1970–86), a CBC-TV documentary series on Canadian nature, wildlife, natural resources, and life in remote communities. He portrayed writer Grey Owl, returning a half-century after his death to be disturbed by ecological deterioration (Episode "Land of Shadows", first aired 2 August 1983).

From 1997 to 2001, he played "Walter" in the TV series La Femme Nikita. In the 2015 six-part series Gangland Undercover on the History Channel, he played "Lizard". His film work includes The Big Town, My Bloody Valentine and Johnny Mnemonic.

=== Music ===
Francks composed songs and played trombone, drums, and flute. He performed in jazz clubs such as George's Spaghetti House in Toronto and the Village Vanguard in New York City, where he recorded a solo album titled Jackie Gleason Says No One in This World Is Like Don Francks (Kapp, 1963). The title echoed a remark made by Gleason when the trio performed "Bye Bye Blackbird" on the April 23, 1963 The Jackie Gleason Show. Two years later, Francks recorded his second album, Lost... and Alone, with orchestral arrangements by Patrick Williams (Kapp, 1965).

In August 1962, Francks's avant-garde jazz group Three debuted unrehearsed at Toronto's Purple Onion coffeehouse. Francks, Lenny Breau on guitar, and Eon Henstridge on double bass were joined on stage by tap dancer Joey Hollingsworth. The evening was recorded live by Breau's manager, George B. Sukornyk, but wasn't released until 2004 under the name At the Purple Onion (Art of Life, 2004). The band performed regularly in Toronto and New York City and appeared in the National Film Board documentary Toronto Jazz, which included rehearsals and performances by Three and two other groups.

Francks and Breau briefly reprised Three in early 1968 in Toronto with bassist Dave Young in place of Henstridge, who had died the year before. In 1999, Francks appeared in the documentary The Genius of Lenny Breau. He recorded his final album, 21st Century Francks, in 2002 (released in 2014) at the Top o' the Senator in Toronto.

=== Voice actor ===
Francks played Archie Goodwin with Mavor Moore as Nero Wolfe for a 1982 series on Canadian radio. He provided the voice of "Skunk" in Gene Simmons's animated television show, My Dad the Rock Star.

According to differing sources, either Francks or Gabriel Dell was the uncredited actor providing the voice of Boba Fett, a Mandalorian bounty hunter, in the Star Wars Holiday Special. Francks, credited, voiced Boba Fett in an episode of Star Wars: Droids.

He voiced several characters in Inspector Gadget along with his daughter Cree Summer, who voiced Penny during the show's first season.

Francks provided voices for Mok Swagger in the 1983 Canadian animated film Rock and Rule and Sabretooth on X-Men. He also voiced Thomas "House" Conklin and Sergeant Carl Proctor in the 1988 Police Academy animated series.

== Personal life ==
Francks married twice and had several children, including Cree Summer and Rainbow Sun Francks.

An avid motorcycle rider, Don Francks also had a collection of twelve antique cars, mostly Model-T Ford racing cars dated 1912 to 1927.

He supported Greenpeace and the Tibetan independence movement.

After quitting alcohol at age 21, Francks smoked marijuana, performing a song called "Smoking Reefers."

As a spokesman for Other Voices (Canadian TV series) in the mid-1960s, he investigated a boy's murder at Red Pheasant Cree Nation in Saskatchewan.

== Death ==
Francks died of lung cancer in Toronto on April 3, 2016.

== Selected filmography ==
=== Film ===
Year	Title	Role	Notes
1968	Finian's Rainbow	Woody Mahoney	
1981	Heavy Metal	Grimaldi / Co-Pilot / Barbarian (voice)	Segments: "Grimaldi", "B-17", "Taarna"
1981	My Bloody Valentine	Chief Jake Newby	
1983	Rock & Rule	Mok (voice)	
1987	The Big Town	Carl Hooker	
1994	Paint Cans	Maitland Burns	
1995	Johnny Mnemonic	"Hooky"	
1996	Bogus	Dr. Surprise	
2005	Lie with Me	Joshua	
2007	I'm Not There	Hobo Joe	
2015	He Never Died	The Man With The Goatee	One of his final roles, portraying Death himself
2016	The Second Time Around	Murray	Posthumous

=== Television ===
Year	Title	Role	Notes
1959-1960	R.C.M.P.	Constable Bill Mitchell	recurring role
1966-1967	Jericho	Captain Franklin Shepphard	recurring role
1968	Mission Impossible	Nicholas Groat	Episode: “A Game of Chess”
1968-1970	Mister Rogers' Neighborhood	Mr. Anybody	recurring role
1978	Star Wars Holiday Special	Boba Fett (voice)	Television film Uncredited
1983	Inspector Gadget	Big M.A.D Agent / M.A.D Agent / Dr. Claw (voice)	5 episodes
1985	Star Wars: Droids	Jann Tosh / Kybo Ren / Boba Fett (voice)	13 episodes
1985-1986	Star Wars: Ewoks	Umwak / Dulok Shaman (voice)	
1988-1989	Police Academy	Proctor / Thomas "House" Conklin (voice)	64 episodes
1991	Swamp Thing	Anton Arcane (voice)	5 episodes
1991-1995	Road to Avonlea	Abe Pike	4 episodes
1992-1996	X-Men	Sabretooth / Graydon Creed Sr. / Puck / Shaman / Phalanx (voice)	17 episodes
1996	Goosebumps	Swamp Hermit	Episode: "The Werewolf of Fever Swamp" Parts 1 & 2
1997-2001	La Femme Nikita	Walter	96 episodes
1997	The Adventures of Sam & Max: Freelance Police	Santa Claus (voice)	Episode: "Christmas Bloody Christmas"
1998	Donkey Kong Country	(voice)	
1998	Silver Surfer	Kalok (voice)	Episode: "The Origin of the Silver Surfer: Part 1"
2002	Tracker	Wahota Keene	Episode: "Native Son"
2006	Puppets Who Kill	Willy "Blind Willy"	Episode: “Bill and the Berkowitzs”
2006	Sons of Butcher	Bonny G (voice)	Episode: “Firin’ The Band”
2010-2011	The Adventures of Chuck and Friends	Deep (voice)	2 episodes

=== Videogames ===
Year	Title	Role	Notes
1996	X-Men vs. Street Fighter	Sabretooth	
2000	Marvel vs. Capcom 2: New Age of Heroes	Sabretooth	Uncredited
2000	X-Men: Mutant Academy	Sabretooth	
2001	X-Men: Mutant Academy 2	Sabretooth	

== Awards ==
- ACTRA Award for Best Dramatic Performance, Drying Up the Streets and The Phoenix Team, 1980 and 1981

== Discography ==
Year	Title	Catalogue	Notes
1963	Jackie Gleason says... "No one in this world is like Don Francks"	Kapp	
1965	Lost... and Alone	Kapp	reached #4 in Canada.
1988	Mesa: The Four Directions	Books for Ears	
1991	Bob's Favorite Street Songs ("Put Down the Duckie" only)	A&M	
1999	Jazzsong	unissued	
2000	The Insanity of One Man	Books for Ears	
2004	At the Purple Onion	Art of Life	
2014	21st Century Francks	Iron Buffalo Productions	

== Bibliography ==
- Heyn, Christopher. "A Conversation with Don Francks". Inside Section One: Creating and Producing TV's La Femme Nikita. Introduction by Peta Wilson. Los Angeles: Persistence of Vision Press, 2006. p. 100–105; ISBN 0-9787625-0-9.
