= At the Purple Onion =

Live album by Don Francks, Lenny Breau, Eon Henstridge
- Released: November 16, 2004
- Recorded: August 1962 at the
- Venues: Purple Onion, Toronto, Ontario Canada
- Genre: Jazz
- Length: 68:00
- Label: Art of Life
- Producer: Paul Kohler

Don Francks chronology
Jazzsong (2002)	At the Purple Onion (2004)	21st Century Francks (2014)

Lenny Breau chronology
The Hallmark Sessions (2003)	At the Purple Onion (2004)	Mosaic (2006)

At the Purple Onion is a live album by Don Francks, Lenny Breau, and Eon Henstridge that was recorded in 1962 and released in 2004. They performed as a trio called Three.

== History ==
Breau's former manager kept the original tapes of this live performance for over 40 years before they were re-discovered. It features Breau, Francks, and Henstridge with Joey Hollingsworth — one vocal and also tap dancing — performing at The Purple Onion club in Toronto, Ontario, Canada. Liner notes and commentary by Francks, Hollingsworth, George B. Sukornyk and Ron Forbes-Roberts are also included.

== Reception ==
Professional ratings
Review scores
Source	Rating
Allmusic	3.5/5 stars
JazzTimes	(equivocal)

Allmusic critic Ken Dryden notes that while "fans of Lenny Breau are likely to be interested in all of his previously unreleased recordings, the focus is primarily on Francks...some listeners may feel a bit overwhelmed by the emphasis on Francks' comedic vocals and narratives."

JazzTimes critic Russell Carlson writes that Breau's "comping hangs in the background on this less-than-even recording. But when Breau gets space to himself, he uses it like a Breau fan wants him to... Serious Breau collectors and fans of wacky jazz theater (do any exist?) will invest wisely in this; those uninitiated in Breau's artistry should turn to Art of Life's previous The Hallmark Sessions."

== Track listing ==
1. "Introduction" – 2:29
2. "A New Electric Chair" (Lenny Breau, Don Francks, Eon Henstridge) – 3:14
3. "The Surrey with the Fringe on Top" (Oscar Hammerstein II, Richard Rodgers) – 5:26
4. "The Newspaper Song" (Breau, Francks, Henstridge) – 9:17
5. "Gum Addiction" (Breau, Francks, Henstridge) – 4:09
6. "Tea for Two" (Irving Caesar, Vincent Youmans) – 13:18
7. "A Gentile Sings the Blues" (Breau, Francks, Henstridge) – 21:04
8. "Work Song" (Nat Adderley) – 5:14
9. "Oscar's Blues" (Oscar Moore) – 1:53
10. "Joey's Solo" (Joey Hollingsworth) – 1:43

== Personnel ==
- Lenny Breau – guitar
- Don Francks – vocals
- Eon Henstridge – bass
- Joey Hollingsworth – vocals on "Work Song", tap dancing on "Work Song", "Oscar's Blues" and "Joey's Solo"

Production notes:

- Paul Kohler – producer, art direction, mastering, mixing, graphic layout, liner notes
