= Cabin Fever (Lenny Breau album) =

Studio album by Lenny Breau
- Released: 1997
- Genre: Jazz
- Length: 52:28
- Label: Guitarchives

Lenny Breau chronology
Chance Meeting (1997)	Cabin Fever (1997)	Boy Wonder (1998)

Cabin Fever is an album by Canadian jazz guitarist Lenny Breau that was released in 1997.

== History ==
Breau had continual drug problems from the mid-1960s, which he only managed to get under control during the last years of his life. At one point, his friend Glen McDonald claims he isolated Breau in a remote cabin to help him straighten out and it was during this time he recorded Breau, resulting in these informal tracks done on solo acoustic guitar. This issue, on noted Canadian rock musician Randy Bachman's Guitarchives label, includes an interview with McDonald discussing the background of the recordings. Others close to Breau dispute the location and claim these are recordings made in the home studios of Don Thompson and Gary Binstead in Toronto, Canada. No recording date appears on the issued compact disc, but Breau's biographer places the time of the recording and Breau's stay at McDonald's cabin in the mid-1970s.

== Reception ==
Professional ratings
Review scores
Source	Rating
Allmusic	3/5 stars

Writing for Allmusic, critic Ken Dryden wrote in his review: "The lack of formal studio post-production adds to the appeal of this disc because the listener gets the feeling of being Breau's sole audience, so an occasional warmup passage or bit of conversation don't prove to be distracting... this CD is an excellent place to start an exploration of his brilliant musicianship."

== Track listing ==
1. "Lenny's Warm up and Improvisation of Autumn Leaves" (Joseph Kosma, Johnny Mercer) – 7:05
2. ""Lenny's Mood" (Lenny Breau) – 2:14
3. "East Side" (Breau) – 1:34
4. "You Came to Me Out of Nowhere" (Johnny Green, Edward Heyman) – 4:29
5. "What Is This Thing Called Love?" (Cole Porter) – 7:48
6. "Days of Wine and Roses" (Henry Mancini) – 10:33
7. "Lenny's Mode" (Breau) – 6:56
8. "Here's That Rainy Day" (Jimmy Van Heusen) – 6:30
9. "Celtic Dream Stream" (Breau) – 5:19
10. "Interview with Glen McDonald" – 6:22

== Personnel ==
- Lenny Breau – acoustic guitar

Production notes:

- Randy Bachman – executive producer, liner notes
- Dave Jewer – artwork, design
- Marty Kramer – research
