= Bringin' It All Back Home (Johnny Copeland album) =

1985 studio album

Studio album by Johnny Copeland
- Released: 1985
- Genre: Texas blues, African folk music
- Length: 35:17
- Label: Rounder
- Producer: Dan Doyle

Johnny Copeland chronology
Texas Twister (1984)	Bringin' It All Back Home (1985)	Blues Power (1989)

Bringin' It All Back Home is an album by the American musician Johnny Copeland. It was released in 1985. Copeland supported the album with a North American tour.

== Production ==
Copeland recorded the album in March 1984 in Abidjan, Ivory Coast, where he collaborated with African musicians. It was produced by his manager, Dan Doyle. Bringin' It All Back Home is considered the first time an American blues musician recorded an album in Africa. Copeland decided to record there after his 1982 tour of the continent; many of the album's songs were inspired by the trek. Copeland included African percussion and the kora on many of the tracks.

== Critical reception ==
Professional ratings
Review scores
Source	Rating
AllMusic	4/5 stars
Robert Christgau	B+
The Encyclopedia of Popular Music	3/5 stars
MusicHound Blues: The Essential Album Guide	4/5 stars

Robert Christgau wrote that the band "finds a groove somewhere between an airborne Congolese rumba and a Gulf Coast shuffle with some tricky dance figures thrown in." The Chicago Tribune noted that "African rhythms and instruments wind their way in and out of Copeland's more familiar Texas blues, sometimes seeming exotic, other times seeming perfectly normal." The New York Times stated that Copeland "sings with a strong, persuasive urgency," and concluded that he "comfortably extended his reach by working with an African rhythm section."

The Globe and Mail determined that "the singer-guitarist's music at its best moves, and the accompanying horn and rhythm sections here prove a cumbersome weight on the motion." The Toronto Star deemed the album "compelling listening, an almost off-handed synthesis of African roots music and raw, elemental blues."

== Track listing ==
All tracks are written by Johnny Copeland except where noted.

Bringin' It All Back Home track listing
No.	Title	Writer(s)	Length
1.	"Kasavubu"		5:20
2.	"The Jungle"		3:29
3.	"Ngote"	T.P. Polyrhythmo	8:15
4.	"Djeli, Djeli Blues"	Djeli Mousa	1:09
5.	"Djeli, Djeli Blues" (Continued)	Mousa	2:12
6.	"Abidjan"		3:37
7.	"Bozalimalamu"		3:14
8.	"Same Thing"		3:53
9.	"Conakry"		4:08
Total length:			35:17

== Personnel ==
Musicians

- Johnny Copeland – guitar, vocals
- Michael Merritt – bass
- Jimmy Wormworth – drums
- Jimmy Hyacinthe, Joel Perry, and Malina – guitars
- Halial, Jean-Claude Kungnon, and Souliman Moamed – percussion
- Koffi Assalé – alto saxophone
- Bert McGowan – tenor saxophone
- Emmet King – trombone
- Ben Bierman – trumpet
- Ken Vangel – piano
- Djeli Mousa – kora (tracks 4 and 5)

Technical

- Dan Doyle – producer, liner notes
- Émile Valognes and Pamphile de Souza – recording engineers
- Dominique Samarcq – mixing engineer
- George Peckham – mastering engineer
- Ken Vangel – arrangement
- Steve Billington – design
- Albert Loudes – photography
- Souleymane Coulibaly – technical assistance
