= The Living Room Tapes, Vol. 1 =

The Living Room Tapes, Volume 1

Studio album by Lenny Breau & Brad Terry
- Released: 1986
- Recorded: October 1978 – January 1982
- Studio: Maine
- Genre: Jazz
- Length: 44:40
- Label: Living Room

Lenny Breau & Brad Terry chronology
Quietude (1985)	The Living Room Tapes, Volume 1 (1986)	Last Sessions (1988)

The Living Room Tapes, Vol. 1 is an album by Canadian jazz guitarist Lenny Breau and clarinetist Brad Terry that was released in 1986.

== History ==
Both solo and duet performances are included in these sessions. They were recorded at the home of Brad Terry in Maine on an informal basis, although both Breau and Terry had discussed commercially releasing the recordings. They were released by Terry after Breau's death.

== Reception ==
Professional ratings
Review scores
Source	Rating
Allmusic	4/5 stars

Writing for Allmusic, critic Scott Yanow wrote in his review: "...the spontaneous jams give Breau a real opportunity to stretch out. The majority of the seven selections are standards and they feature Breau and the unknown Terry in top form."

== Reissues ==
- The Living Room Tapes, Vol. 1 was reissued on CD in 1988 by Musical Heritage Society Records.
- The Living Room Tapes, Vol. 1 was reissued on CD in 1995 by DOS Records.
- The Living Room Tapes, Vol. 1 was remastered and reissued with additional tracks from The Living Room Tapes, Vol. 2 in 2004 by Art of Life Records as The Complete Living Room Tapes.

== Track listing ==
=== Side one ===
1. "Blues for Carole" (Lenny Breau, Brad Terry) – 9:04
2. "How High the Moon" (Nancy Hamilton, Morgan Lewis) – 7:45
3. "You Needed Me" (Randy Goodrum) – 5:06

=== Side two ===
1. "The Claw" (Jerry Reed) – 3:00
2. "Once I Had A Secret Love" (Sammy Fain, Paul Francis Webster) – 7:47
3. "Sweet Georgia Brown" (Ben Bernie, Maceo Pinkard, Kenneth Casey) – 6:23
4. "Foolish Heart" (Ned Washington, Victor Young) – 5:18

== Personnel ==
- Lenny Breau – guitar
- Brad Terry – clarinet
