= Nathan Beauregard =

American musician

Nathan Beauregard (front left) on cover of Arhoolie LP 1084

Nathan Beauregard (born Nathan Bogard; February 1892 (probable) – May 25, 1970) was an American blues singer and guitarist.

== Biography ==
According to researchers Bob Eagle and Eric S. LeBlanc, Nathan Bogard was born in Benton County, Mississippi, in February 1892, the month indicated in his 1900 census entry. He sometimes claimed falsely to have been born in the 1860s, and his official death record gives a birth date of July 2, 1887.

Born blind, Beauregard soon became a musician, his repertoire consisting of songs of the pre-blues era and dance tunes like "Spoonful" and "Pretty Bunch of Daisies". When he was in his thirties, in the times of the "race recordings" of the 1920s, he saw many blues musicians with minor talent make a fortune as a recording artist while he himself was not offered such a chance.

During the folk and blues revival of the 1960s Beauregard was discovered in Memphis by Bill Barth, who convinced him to work as a musician again. In the short time between his discovery in 1968 and his death in 1970, he played at various folk and blues festivals (e.g. the 1968 Memphis Country Blues Festival, which has been recorded on the Sire and Blue Horizon labels) and on a number of compilation albums on such labels as Blue Thumb, Arhoolie and Adelphi.

He died in Memphis on May 25, 1970.
