= LA Bootleg 1984 =

Live album by Lenny Breau
- Released: September 30, 2014
- Recorded: June 4, 1984
- Venue: Donte's, Hollywood, California
- Genre: Jazz
- Length: 66:27
- Label: Linus Entertainment
- Producer: Randy Bachman

Lenny Breau chronology
Mosaic (2006)	LA Bootleg 1984 (2014)

LA Bootleg 1984 is a live album by jazz guitarist Lenny Breau that was recorded in 1984 and released in 2014.

== History ==
The album was recorded live at Donte's in Hollywood, California, shortly before Breau was murdered. After a long struggle with drug abuse, Breau was finally sober. He was accompanied by Ted Hawk on drums and Paul Gormley on bass. The tapes for the performance were obtained by Randy Bachman who has developed a large archive of Breau's works. The album was nominated for best solo jazz album of the year at the 2015 Canadian Juno Awards.

== Reception ==
Music critic David Farrell of New Canadian Music wrote of the album, "The audio clarity is first rate on this 60+ minute set, and Lenny dazzles in front of a willingly submissive bass/drums rhythm section. Chet Atkins once called Lenny "the greatest guitar player in the world". This recording shows why."

== Track listing ==
1. "I Love You" (Cole Porter) – 6:56
2. "If You Could See Me Now" (Tadd Dameron, Carl Sigman) – 7:07
3. "Blues Number One" (Lenny Breau) – 2:05
4. "Stella by Starlight" (Ned Washington, Victor Young) – 11:19
5. "Days Gone By" (Don Thompson) – 5:25
6. "There Will Never Be Another You" (Mack Gordon, Harry Warren) – 7:24
7. "When I Fall in Love" (Edward Heyman, Victor Young) – 6:41
8. "Four" (Miles Davis) – 7:01
9. "Lover Man" (Jimmy Davis, Jimmy Sherman, Roger Ramirez) – 6:16
10. "Blues Number Two" (Breau) – 1:44
11. "Noel's Theme" (Breau) – 4:29

== Personnel ==
- Lenny Breau – guitar
- Paul Gormley – bass
- Ted Hawk – drums

Production notes:

- Randy Bachman – executive producer
- Phil deGruy – recording
- Christian Stonehouse – mixing, mastering, artwork & design
- Bobby Foley, Scott Rogers, Geoff Kulawick - artwork consultants
