= Legacy (Lenny Breau album) =

Live album by Lenny Breau
- Released: 1984
- Recorded: June 14, 1983
- Venue: Bourbon Street, Toronto
- Genre: Jazz
- Label: Relaxed Rabbit

Lenny Breau chronology
| When Lightn' Strikes (1982) | Legacy (1984) | Quietude (1985) |

Legacy is a live album by Canadian jazz guitarist Lenny Breau. It was recorded in Toronto in June 1983, and released posthumously in 1984. Recordings from the same performance were later released on Quietude.

Released on LP in 1984, the album's back cover notes written by Gene Lees state, "Lenny died in Los Angeles at the age of 43 in August of 1984 under murky circumstances". The album was remastered and reissued in 1995 by Guitarchives as Live at Bourbon St. with additional tracks.

== Track listing ==
1. "There Is No Greater Love" (Isham Jones, Marty Symes) – 6:30
2. "I Fall in Love Too Easily" (Sammy Cahn, Jule Styne) – 6:45
3. "Blues in My Case" (Lenny Breau, David Young) – 5:21
4. "What Is This Thing Called Love?" (Cole Porter) – 7:18
5. "The Two Lonely People" (Bill Evans) – 8:04
6. "Sparkle Dust" (Lenny Breau, David Young) – 2:30

== Personnel ==
- Lenny Breau – guitar
- David Young – bass
