= Dan Doyle (music producer) =

American record producer

Dan Doyle is an American music producer.

== Life and career ==
Based in New York City, Doyle began his career as a sound engineer with Adelphi Records. One of Doyle's first work as a producer was in 1978 with jazz guitarist Lenny Breau, working on what would become Adelphi's Breau trilogy Five O'Clock Bells, Mo' Breau, and Last Sessions. Doyle was instrumental in getting Rounder Records to sign the blues guitarist and singer Johnny Copeland to a recording contract. Doyle has produced many other notable acts including jazz alto saxophonist Arthur Blythe, jazz saxophonist Archie Shepp, rock band Crazy Horse, blues guitarist Houston Stackhouse, blues guitarist Bukka White, country blues singer and guitarist Mississippi John Hurt, blues guitarist Otis Rush, blues singer and guitarist R. L. Burnside, and guitarist Stevie Ray Vaughan.

== Selected production discography ==
- Jimmy Madison - Bumps On A Smooth Surface (Adelphi Records, 1978)
- Arthur Blythe - Bush Baby (Adelphi Records, 1978)
- Lenny Breau - Five O'Clock Bells (Adelphi Records, 1979)
- Johnny Copeland - Copeland Special (Rounder Records, 1981)
- Johnny Copeland - Make My Home Where I Hang My Hat (Rounder Records, 1982)
- Johnny Copeland - Texas Twister (Rounder Records, 1983)
- Archie Shepp - The Good Life (Varrick Records, 1984)
- Johnny Copeland - Bringing It All Back Home (Rounder Records, 1985)
- Crazy Horse - Left For Dead (Heyday Records, 1989)
- Skip James - She Lyin' (Genes Records, 1993)
- Houston Stackhouse- Cryin' Won't Help You (Genes Records, 1994])
- Bukka White - 1963 Isn't 1962 (Genes Records, 1994)
- Mississippi John Hurt - Memorial Anthology (Edsel Records, 1994)
- Johnny Copeland - Texas Party (Orbis, 1995)
- Otis Rush - Live And Awesome (Genes Records, 1996)
- R. L. Burnside- My Black Name A-Ringin' (Genes Records, 1999)
- Stevie Ray Vaughan and Johnny Copeland - S.R.V., Don't Stop By The Creek (Legacy, Epic 2000)
- Furry Lewis with Lee Baker, Jr. - Take Your Time (Genes Records, 2000)
