= Vision (McCoy Tyner song) =

Jazz instrumental composed by McCoy Tyner

Vision is a jazz instrumental composed by McCoy Tyner which first appeared on Tyner's 1969 album Expansions. It was the signature tune for guitarist Lenny Breau who recorded it several times, including on his albums The Legendary Lenny Breau... Now!, Live at Bourbon St., and The Living Room Tapes, Vol. 2.
