= Catch Up with the Blues =

Studio album by Johnny Copeland
- Released: 1994
- Genre: Blues
- Label: Verve

Catch Up with the Blues is an album by the American musician Johnny Copeland. It was released in 1994 on Verve Records. It was recorded April 27–30 and May 1–3, 1993, at Kiva Recording Studios in Memphis, Tennessee. The album was produced by John Snyder and Jay Newland.

The album featured Copeland on rhythm and lead guitar and vocals, along with Richard Ford (steel guitar), Sonny Terry and Brownie McGhee (harmonica), Floyd Phillips (piano), Bobby Kyle (rhythm and lead guitar), Mabon "Teenie" Hodges (rhythm guitar), Randy Lee Lippincott (bass guitar), Barry Harrison (drums), Robert Hall (tambourine), Jaqueline Johnson and Jacquelyn Reddick (background vocals), and the Memphis Horns (Wayne Jackson on trumpet and trombone, and Andrew Love on tenor saxophone).

The album also featured guest musicians Lonnie Brooks (lead and rhythm guitar on tracks 2, 4, 5, 7, 11), Clarence "Gatemouth" Brown (lead and rhythm guitar, and violin on tracks 2, 4, 7, 11), and Joe "Guitar" Hughes (lead guitar and vocals on tracks 1 & 8).

== Critical reception ==
Professional ratings
Review scores
Source	Rating
AllMusic	3/5 stars

The Morning Call deemed the album "a fine mix of rough-edged rockers such as 'Rolling with the Punches' and 'Making a Fool of Myself' as well as a stellar ballad, 'Life's Rainbow (Nature Song)'."

== Track listing ==
1. "Catch Up with the Blues"
2. "Rolling with the Punches"
3. "Every Dog's Got His Day"
4. "Cold, Cold Winter"
5. "Making a Fool of Myself"
6. "Rain"
7. "The Grammy Song"
8. "Bye, Bye Baby"
9. "Another Man's Wife"
10. "I'm Creepin'"
11. "Pedal to the Metal"
12. "Life's Rainbow (Nature Song)"
