= Fly High =

Fly High may refer to:

- Fly High (film) or Flight, a 2009 South Korean film

== Music ==
=== Albums ===
- Fly High (album) or the title song, by Me & My, 2001
- Fly High (EP) or a track on the EP, by Infinite H, 2013

=== Songs ===
- "Fly High" (Ayumi Hamasaki song), 2000
- "Fly High", by Bridget St John from Songs for the Gentle Man
- "Fly High", by Dreamcatcher from Prequel
- "Fly High", by the Mad Capsule Markets from 010
- "Fly High", by Shaggy from Rise
- "Fly High", by Slushii from Out of Light
- "Fly High", by W-inds
- "Flyhigh", by Soulfly from Primitive

== See also ==
- Flying High (disambiguation)
