= The Legendary Lenny Breau... Now! =

The Legendary Lenny Breau...Now!

Studio album by Lenny Breau
- Released: 1979
- Recorded: August–September 1977, August 1978
- Studio: C.A. Workshop, Nashville, Tennessee
- Genre: Jazz
- Length: 30:24
- Label: Sound Hole

Lenny Breau chronology
Lenny Breau (1979)	The Legendary Lenny Breau...Now! (1979)	Standard Brands (1981)

The Legendary Lenny Breau...Now! is an album by Canadian jazz guitarist Lenny Breau that was released in 1979.

== History ==
The album was recorded in Chet Atkins' home studio in Nashville, Tennessee. Due to Breau's drug problem, he stayed in Atkins' home prior to the session in order to be clean and able to perform. The release was on John Knowles label, Sound Hole Records, which had only two releases (the other being Knowles' own Sittin' Back Pickin'). This out of print album is one of Breau's rarest. It was sold only through ads in guitar magazines, with total sales estimated between two and three thousand. Breau recorded with guitars made by Tom Holmes and Hascal Haile. On some songs Breau played a separate rhythm guitar track that he later overdubbed a solo onto.

== Reception ==
Professional ratings
Review scores
Source	Rating
Allmusic	3/5 stars

Writing for Allmusic, music critic Paul Kohler wrote of the album "this record showcases Breau in the solo guitar spotlight... Breau's version of McCoy Tyner's "Visions" is astounding!!"

== Track listing ==
1. "I Can't Help It" (Hank Williams) – 4:34
2. "Always" (Irving Berlin) – 3:44
3. "Our Delight" (Tadd Dameron) – 4:06
4. "Freight Train" (Elizabeth Cotten; arranged by Lenny Breau) – 2:55
5. "Ebony Queen" (McCoy Tyner) – 3:46
6. "I Love You" (Cole Porter) – 4:20
7. "It Could Happen to You" (Johnny Burke, Jimmy Van Heusen) – 2:46
8. "Visions" (McCoy Tyner) – 4:13

== Personnel ==
- Lenny Breau – acoustic and electric guitar
- Paul Yandell - front cover photography
