= Joe "Guitar" Hughes =

American blues musician (1937–2003)

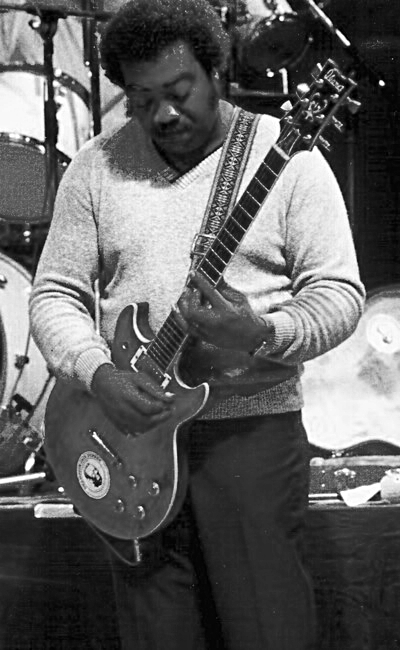
- Hughes in 1983

Background information
- Born: Maurice Hughes; September 29, 1937; Houston, Texas, U.S.
- Died: May 20, 2003 (aged 65) Houston, Texas, U.S.
- Genres: Texas blues
- Occupation: Musician
- Instrument: Guitar
- Years active: 1950s–2003

Joe "Guitar" Hughes (born Maurice Hughes; September 29, 1937 – May 20, 2003) was an American blues musician from Houston, Texas.

== Career ==
Hughes was inspired by Clarence "Gatemouth" Brown and Johnny "Guitar" Watson – "anyone who had fire in their playing and a good shuffle". His first band was the Dukes of Rhythm in the 1950s, which also included his friend Johnny Copeland. He worked with Little Richard and in Bobby Bland's band in the 1960s.

He toured in Europe starting in the 1980s and released Texas Guitar Master on the Dutch label Double Trouble Records in 1986. The album included a live track with Hughes and fellow guitarist Pete Mayes. If You Want to See the Blues was released by Black Top Records in 1989.

Hughes died of a heart attack on May 20, 2003.

== Selected discography ==
- 1986 - Texas Guitar Master (Double Trouble), featuring Pete Mayes
- 1988 - Craftsman (Double Trouble)
- 1989 - If You Want to See the Blues (Black Top)
- 1995 - Down & Depressed (The Network)
- 1996 - Live at Vrendenburg (Double Trouble)
- 1996 - Texas Guitar Slinger (Bullseye Blues)
- 2001 - Stuff Like That (Blues Express)

== See also ==
- List of electric blues musicians
- List of Texas blues musicians
