= Hal Lone Pine =

American-Canadian country singer (1916–1977)

Harold John Breau
- Born: June 5, 1916; Pea Cove, Maine
- Died: March 26, 1977 (aged 60); Maine
- Occupation: musician
- Relatives: Betty Cody (wife), Lenny Breau (son)

Harold John Breau (5 June 1916 - 26 March 1977), known professionally as Hal Lone Pine, was an American-Canadian country singer. Born in Pea Cove, Maine in 1916, Lone Pine married French Canadian wife Betty Cody in 1938, and the two began performing, eventually forming the band Lone Pine And His Mountaineers, who recorded a string of successful singles for RCA. The pair moved to New Brunswick and eventually Winnipeg, where he performed a regular CKY radio show, and scored hit singles including "It’s Goodbye and So Long to You" and "The Trail of the Lonesome Pine".

The band ended after the couple split up. Breau continued performing under the Hal Lone Pine name, releasing albums in Canada on his own and with Canadian country singer Jeanie Ward until shortly before his death in 1977.

In Canada, Lone Pine is also known for writing "Prince Edward Island Is Heaven to Me", which has been covered by several artists including Roy MacCaull, Brent Williams, Dick Nolan, George Hamilton IV, Ned Landry, Hank Rivers, Eddie LeGere and Mac Wiseman. Lone Pine fathered four children with Betty Cody, including jazz guitarist Lenny Breau and guitarist Denny Breau. He died in Maine in 1977. He was inducted into the Maine Country Music Hall of Fame.

== Discography ==
See also Lone Pine And His Mountaineers

=== Solo ===
- Sings His All-Time Favorites (Arc Records, 1962)
- Coast Of Maine And Other Favorites!.. (Arc Records, 1963)
- More Show Stoppers (Arc Records, 1963)
- "Yesterday" and "Today" (Rodeo International, 1969)
- The One & Only (Audat, 1974)

=== With Jeanie Ward ===
- Songs Everyone Remembers (Arc Records, 1960)
- Hymns And Heart Songs (Arc Records, 1962)
- Songs & Laughter (Banff, 1968)
- Songs & Comedy (Lone Pine Records)

=== Compilations ===
- Hal Lone Pine & Betty Cody: On The Trail Of The Lonesome Pine (Bear Family Records, 2006)
- Winter Time In Maine (B.A.C.M., 2015)
- I Heard The Bluebirds Sing (Jasmine Records, 2024)
