= Minors Aloud =

Studio album by Buddy Emmons, Lenny Breau
- Released: 1978
- Recorded: August 7–8, 1978
- Studio: Pete's Place, Nashville, Tennessee
- Genre: Jazz
- Length: 37:36
- Label: Flying Fish
- Producer: Michael Melford

Lenny Breau chronology
Guitar Sounds from Lenny Breau (1969)	Minors Aloud (1978)	Five O'Clock Bells (1979)

Minors Aloud (subtitled Buddy Emmons with Lenny Breau) is an album by American pedal steel guitarist Buddy Emmons and Canadian guitarist Lenny Breau that was released in 1978.

== History ==
Minors Aloud was digitally remastered and reissued on CD by Art of Life in 2005 and includes a 6-page booklet, original and new liner notes and a copy of the lead sheet for the title track handwritten by Breau himself.

In his liner notes for the reissue, Emmons states: "... producer Mike Melford asked me if I would be interested in recording with Lenny Breau. My response was a quick yes but on the condition that Lenny would be the featured artist and I'd be listed as a guest... I learned later that Lenny hadn't been told anything about the project other than to just show up. With a few days preparation and a little polish to the arrangements, this would have been a different album. For better or worse we'll never know, but I do know the solos were spontaneous, the energy level was fantastic, and we all had a great time getting there."

== Reception ==
Professional ratings
Review scores
Source	Rating
Allmusic	2.5/5 stars
DownBeat	4/5 stars

Writing for Allmusic, music critic Paul Kohler singled out a few of the songs as noteworthy and notes "The pedal steel definitely gives a rather unique sound to Benny Golson's "Killer Joe," though Breau is clearly the more interesting soloist... Flying Fish was always interested in mixing musicians from country and jazz; this somewhat uneven date should be considered at least a partial success."

DownBeat assigned the album 4 stars. Reviewer Pete Welding wrote, "The musical path this excellent quintet follows is straight ahead modern jazz—sort of a mellowed-out bebop—which it performs with both vigor and creativity, never over-reaching its grasp but generally playing at ability-stretching levels. The two guitarists work hand-in-glove, Emmons being to the steel guitar what Breau is to the conventional instrument—one of its standard bearers, with a finely honed harmonic sense, intelligence and imagination to spare and, not least of all, great chops. It’s a spark-producing pairing as well, with the two consistently playing at or near the top of their abilities. Breau crackles with fire and invention just about every time up. and Emmons responds in kind. Tasty is as tasty does".

== Track listing ==
1. "Minors Aloud" (Buddy Emmons, Lenny Breau) – 3:41
2. "Compared to What" (Gene McDaniels) – 4:39
3. "Killer Joe" (Benny Golson) – 6:08
4. "Long Way to Go" (Michael Melford, Wolf Opper) – 4:27
5. "Secret Love" (Sammy Fain, Paul Francis Webster) – 5:06
6. "Scrapple from the Apple" (Charlie Parker) – 7:08
7. "On a Bach Bouree" (Breau) – 6:27

== Personnel ==
- Buddy Emmons – pedal steel guitar
- Lenny Breau – guitar
- Randy Goodrum – keyboards
- Charles Dungey – bass
- Kenny Malone – drums

== Production notes ==
- Michael Melford – producer
- Al Pachucki – engineer
- Ben Tallent – engineer
- J. D. Sloan – photography
- Buddy Emmons – liner notes
