= Quietude (Lenny Breau album) =

Live album by Lenny Breau
- Released: 1985
- Recorded: June 14, 1983
- Venue: Bourbon Street, Toronto
- Genre: Jazz
- Label: Electric Muse

Lenny Breau chronology
Legacy (1984)	Quietude (1985)	The Living Room Tapes, Vol. 1 (1986)

Quietude is a live album by Canadian guitarist Lenny Breau that was released posthumously in 1985.

Originally released on LP in 1985, it was remastered and reissued in 1995 on the Guitarchives label as Live at Bourbon St. with additional tracks.

== Track listing ==
1. "On Green Dolphin Street" (Bronisław Kaper, Ned Washington) – 8:35
2. "If You Could See Me Now" (Tadd Dameron, Carl Sigman) – 5:49
3. "Summertime" (George Gershwin, Ira Gershwin, DuBose Heyward) – 6:37
4. "Quiet and Blue" (Lenny Breau) – 2:45
5. "All Blues" (Miles Davis) – 7:36
6. "Visions" (McCoy Tyne) – 13:26

== Personnel ==
- Lenny Breau – guitar
- David Young – bass
