= Chance Meeting (album) =

Live album by Lenny Breau and Tal Farlow
- Released: 1997
- Recorded: May 21, 1980
- Venue: The Sign of the Times, Rumson, New Jersey
- Genre: Jazz
- Length: 54:32
- Label: Guitarchives

Lenny Breau chronology
| Live at Bourbon St. (1995) | Chance Meeting (1997) | Cabin Fever (1997) |

Chance Meeting is an album by jazz guitarists Tal Farlow and Lenny Breau that was released in 1997.

== History ==
While being profiled in a PBS documentary, it was suggested to Farlow that he be paired with a younger jazz guitarist. He suggested Breau, and the two guitarists performed this set at a small nightclub in Rumson, New Jersey. It was their first and only performance together.

== Reception ==
Professional ratings
Review scores
| Source | Rating |
|---|---|
| Allmusic | 4/5 stars |
| JazzTimes | (favorable) |

In his review for Allmusic, music critic Ken Dryden wrote the musicians "complement one another's playing as if they had worked as a regular duo. Breau, on his seven-string guitar, is a bundle of energy most of the time, with flurries of notes accompanied by his flawless rhythm. Of course, the senior player is no slouch as a soloist on any of the eight standards heard on this CD... It's too bad that this enjoyable session was only a one-time affair." In reviewing the release for JazzTimes, critic Jim Ferguson wrote, "The mutual admiration between the players is obvious throughout the nine impromptu performances... More than sophisticated chordal structures and harmonics, the thing that these two geniuses-a generation apart-really have in common is the music, which eloquently speaks for itself."

== Track listing ==
1. "I Love You" (Cole Porter) – 5:24
2. "Satin Doll" (Duke Ellington) – 7:03
3. "My Funny Valentine" (Lorenz Hart, Richard Rodgers) – 8:40
4. "All the Things You Are" (Oscar Hammerstein II, Jerome Kern) – 11:33
5. "Conversation" (Farlow, Breau) – 2:34
6. "Cherokee" (Ray Noble, Peter Maurice) – 4:30
7. "What Is This Thing Called Love?" (Porter) – 6:56
8. "Broadway" (Wilbur Bird, Teddy McRae, Henri Woode) – 6:03
9. "My Foolish Heart" (Ned Washington, Victor Young) – 7:00

== Personnel ==
- Tal Farlow – guitar
- Lenny Breau – guitar
- Lyn Christie – bass on "All the Things You Are" and "Cherokee"
- Nat Garratano – drums on "All the Things You Are" and "Cherokee"

Production notes:

- Randy Bachman – executive producer
- John Dildine – engineer
