= Joe Rigby =

American multi-instrumentalist (1940–2019)

- Born: Joseph Rigby; September 3, 1940; New York City, U.S.
- Died: July 16, 2019 (aged 78)
- Genres: Jazz
- Occupation: Musician
- Instruments: Tenor, alto, baritone, soprano and sopranino saxophone, flute, piccolo
- Years active: 1970s–2019
- Labels: Homeboy Music, Improvising Beings

Joe Rigby (September 3, 1940 – July 16, 2019) was an American multi-instrumentalist. Primarily a saxophonist, Rigby is known for his affiliation with the downtown New York jazz community in the late 1970s and his affiliation with Milford Graves as well as for his solo performances.

== Life and career ==
Rigby, born September 3, 1940, grew up in the Sugar Hill neighborhood of Harlem, New York, where his neighbors included Johnny Hodges, Sonny Rollins, Jackie McLean, and Kenny Burrell. He started playing piano when he was six, and began playing flute and clarinet in high school. His focus switched to the saxophone after hearing John Coltrane and Charlie Parker and he studied privately with Joe Allard, Garvin Bushell, and Anders Paulsson. Performing on alto, soprano, baritone and sopranino saxophone, Rigby began performing professionally with Graves, Johnny Copeland, and Steve Reid, with whom he led the Master Brotherhood. In the late 1970s, he formed and led his own group, Dynasty.

Rigby, who graduated from the College of Staten Island with a bachelor's degree in Music and a minor in Music Education, taught instrumental music with the New York City Board of Education from 1989 until he retired in 2004. He was named New York's Music Teacher of the Year in 1996. He released a record with trumpeter Ted Daniel on his own Homeboy label, and the album Music as a solo artist in 2009. Also in 2009, on French label Improvising Beings, Rigby released For Harriet with a quartet which included bagpiper player Calum MacCrimmon. The critic Andrew Hamlin listed the album at #1 in the Village Voice's 2011 Pazz and Jop poll.
