= The Hallmark Sessions =

Studio album by Lenny Breau
- Released: November 18, 2003
- Recorded: November 28, 1961
- Studio: Hallmark Studios, Toronto, Ontario, Canada
- Genre: Jazz
- Label: Art of Life
- Producer: Paul Kohler (Reissue)

Lenny Breau chronology
Pickin' Cotten (2001)	The Hallmark Sessions (2003)	The Complete Living Room Tapes (2003)

The Hallmark Sessions is an album by the Canadian jazz guitarist Lenny Breau that was released in 2003.

== History ==
In his first professional solo recording session, Breau recorded these tracks in Toronto, Ontario, Canada, when he was 20 years old. His former manager kept the original tapes for over 40 years before they were re-discovered. Seven of the tracks include Rick Danko and Levon Helm as the rhythm section.

== Reception ==
Professional ratings
Review scores
Source	Rating
All About Jazz	(favorable)
AllMusic	4.5/5 stars
The Encyclopedia of Popular Music	3/5 stars
The Penguin Guide to Jazz Recordings	3/4 stars

Elliott Simon, in his All About Jazz review, wrote, "The sound quality, aside from a few minor rough spots, is excellent and the six re-presented stereo versions of the trio pieces sparkle. Breau in a word is awesome and to think that his playing was this developed at such a young age is mind boggling."

Writing for AllMusic, the critic Scott Yanow gave the album 4.5 out of 5 stars and wrote, "Hallmark Sessions is an extraordinary release... Breau plays beautiful chords (sounding a little like Johnny Smith in spots) and inventive single-note lines. It is remarkable that this music was not released until 2003, but a happy event that it was finally put out. This is a must for Breau fans and an important release for all jazz guitar lovers."

Mark Miller of The Globe and Mail stated that the recordings are "far more than merely formative performances," and remarked: "The guitarist is immediately identifiable by his touch and technique -- a diamond in the rough, perhaps, but recognizably a diamond all the same."

In a review for Mint Lounge, Sanjoy Narayan noted that, although the music is "spare," "it shows how effortlessly elegant the young jazz guitarist already was... Breau's style is clean, clear, oozing with talent. It's difficult not to fall for The Hallmark Sessions when you first listen to it."

Russell Carlson of JazzTimes commented: "Breau was a seriously singular guitarist, the kind that can make other, insecure guitarists jealous as all hell... His improvisations were pieces of outside-the-box magic that mixed elements of jazz, country, rock and classical music that, amazingly, didn’t sound contrived."

== Track listing ==
Writing credits as shown on record label.

1. "It Could Happen to You" (Johnny Burke, Jimmy Van Heusen) – 5:42
2. "Oscar's Blues" (Lenny Breau) – 3:38
3. "I'll Remember April" (Don Raye, Gene de Paul, Patricia Johnston) – 4:25
4. "Undecided" (Charlie Shavers, Sid Robins) – 3:34
5. "My Old Flame" (Sam Coslow, Arthur Johnston) – 5:29
6. "'D' Minor Blues" (Breau) – 5:10
7. "'R' Tune" (Breau) – 3:20
8. "Lenny's Western Blues" (Breau) – 2:33
9. "Cannonball Rag" (Merle Travis) – 2:13
10. "Solea" (Traditional) – 4:01
11. "Taranta" (Traditional) – 3:58
12. "Arabian Fantasy" (Traditional) – 2:51
13. "Brazilian Love Song (Batucada)" (Luiz Bonfá) – 2:07
  Bonus stereo version tracks:
14. "Oscar's Blues" (Moore) – 3:39
15. "I'll Remember April" (de Paul, Johnston, Raye) – 4:24
16. "Undecided" (Robins, Shavers) – 3:34
17. "My Old Flame" (Coslow, Johnston) – 5:29
18. "'D' Minor Blues" (Breau) – 5:08
19. "'R' Tune" (Breau) – 3:17

== Personnel ==
- Lenny Breau – guitar
- Rick Danko – bass guitar
- Levon Helm – drums

Production notes:

- Paul Kohler – producer, art direction, mastering, mixing, graphic layout, liner notes
