= Guitar Sounds from Lenny Breau =

Studio album by Lenny Breau
- Released: 1968
- Studio: RCA "Nashville Sound" Studio, Nashville, Tennessee
- Genre: Jazz
- Length: 47:44
- Label: RCA Victor
- Producer: Chet Atkins, Danny Davis

Lenny Breau chronology
Guitar Sounds from Lenny Breau (1968)	The Velvet Touch of Lenny Breau – Live! (1969)

Guitar Sounds from Lenny Breau is an album by Canadian jazz guitarist Lenny Breau that was released in 1968.

== History ==
Breau befriended Chet Atkins, which resulted in Breau's first two albums for RCA. Atkins and Breau also collaborated on Standard Brands in 1981. Breau spent much time around Atkins's office in Nashville during and after these two RCA albums. They played clubs regularly.

Atkins helped Breau get his first recording contract after hearing one of his studio tapes. Atkins stated in an interview for Frets magazine, "Paul Yandell first brought Lenny to my attention around 1966. I immediately knew that here was one of the great players of this world. He had taken some of my fragmentary ideas, and gone on and on into musical areas I had never dreamed of."

The songs were recorded, accompanied by fellow Winnipegers Ron Halldorson and Reg Kelly, during two sessions under the supervision of Atkins. A technical difficulty delayed the release of the album until late winter. Breau was displeased with the track selection and sequencing, preferring the more straight ahead jazz tunes the trio had recorded versus the pop material Atkins chose to include.

== Reception ==
Professional ratings
Review scores
Source	Rating
Allmusic	3.5/5 stars
Rolling Stone	(positive)

Rolling Stone reviewer John Burke called Breau's playing "tender" and "understated" and stated in his review: "... part of the fascination in hearing an imaginative player like Breau lies in how he reinterprets each song so that you hear it as if for the first time... Within the pop/country, rock/jazz frame he has set for himself, you feel Breau extend himself to the fullest. A handsome first effort." Music critic Thom Jurek of Allmusic called it "an impressive debut as any you're likely to find because of Breau's startling originality on the instrument."

== Track listing ==
1. "King of the Road" (Roger Miller) – 2:29
2. "Taranta" (Lenny Breau) – 6:51
3. "Don't Think Twice, It's All Right" (Bob Dylan) – 4:31
4. "A Hard Day's Night" (Lennon–McCartney) – 4:12
5. "Georgia on My Mind" (Hoagy Carmichael, Stuart Gorrell) – 5:21
6. "Monday, Monday" (John Philips) – 2:30
7. "My Funny Valentine" (Lorenz Hart, Richard Rodgers) – 4:53
8. "Freight Train" (Elizabeth Cotten) – 3:31
9. "Cold, Cold Heart" (Hank Williams) – 4:44
10. "Music to Watch Girls By" (Sid Ramin, Tony Velona) – 4:29
11. "Call Me" (Tony Hatch) – 4:13

Only tracks 1–10 appeared on the original 1968 release. The album was reissued on CD in 2005 by Wounded Bird Records with the addition of one bonus track, "Call Me".

== Personnel ==
- Lenny Breau – guitar
- Ronnie Halldorson – bass
- Reginald Kelly – drums
