= Betty Cody =

American singer (1921–2014)

- Born: Rita Francis Coté; August 17, 1921; Sherbrooke, Quebec, Canada
- Died: July 1, 2014 (aged 92); Lewiston, Maine, U.S.
- Occupation: Singer
- Spouse(s): Harold Breau (1940-19??; divorced); 4 children George Binette (19??-2002; his death)
- Musical career
- Genre: Country

Betty Cody (born Rita Francis Coté; August 17, 1921 – July 1, 2014) was a Canadian-born country music singer. Her notable singles include the 1952 RCA releases "Tom Tom Yodel" and "I Found Out More Than You Ever Knew", and "Please Throw Away The Glass" released by RCA in 1954. In 1979, Cody was inducted into the Maine Country Music Hall Of Fame.

== Early years ==
She was born Rita Francis Coté to Alphonse and Albina Coté in Sherbrooke, Quebec, Canada, the sixth of 11 children. When still a child she moved to Auburn, Maine.

== Career ==
In 1940, Betty Cody married Harold Breau, a musician who performed as Hal Lone Pine. The couple started performing together as Lone Pine And His Mountaineers, and she adopted the stage name of Betty Cody. The couple moved to New Brunswick in 1948 and Cody signed a contract with RCA Records in the early 1950s. In 1952 she had her hit in the U.S. country charts with "Tom Tom Yodel". Her 1953 hit single "I Found Out More Than You Ever Knew" reached No. 10 on the Billboard country chart. In 1957, the Breau family moved to Winnipeg, Manitoba, where they performed on CTV Television. Slim Andrews, the chair on the board of directors of the Maine Country Music Hall of Fame called her "the number one country singer to ever go out of the state of Maine." She released a solo album, Singing Again on the Maine-based label EAB Records in 1979.

== Personal life ==
After splitting from her husband she gave up her career and worked in a shoe shop in Lewiston, Maine to care for her three younger sons. Betty and Harold eventually divorced. Her eldest son, Lenny Breau, who had lived with his father, later moved to California. Lenny became a noted jazz guitarist. In 1984, Lenny Breau's dead body was found in a swimming pool. The coroner ruled that he was strangled and his death was ruled a murder. The case was never solved. Another son, Denny Breau, also became a professional guitar player, based out of Maine.

Cody later remarried to George Binette, by which marriage she became stepmother to four children. Binette died in 2002.

== Death ==
Betty Cody died from undisclosed illness on July 1, 2014, at age 92 in Lewiston, Maine.

== Discography ==
See also Lone Pine And His Mountaineers

- Hopeless Woman / The Way You Treated Me Featuring Her Sons Denny & Lenny Breau (7" Single)
- Singing Again (1979, EAB Records)

=== Compilations ===
- Betty Cody's Country Souvenir Album (1985 Cattle Records)
- The Successful Hillbilly Era Of Betty Cody (2005, Cattle Compact)
- Hal Lone Pine & Betty Cody: On The Trail Of The Lonesome Pine (Bear Family Records, 2006)
