= Johnny Copeland =

Texas blues guitarist and singer (1937–1997)

Background information
- Born: John Clyde Copeland; March 27, 1937; Haynesville, Louisiana, U.S.
- Died: July 3, 1997 (aged 60) New York City, New York, U.S.
- Genres: Texas blues, electric blues
- Occupations: Guitarist, singer
- Instruments: Guitar; vocals
- Years active: 1950s–1997
- Labels: Various, including Duke and Verve

John Clyde Copeland (March 27, 1937 – July 3, 1997) was an American Texas blues guitarist and singer. In 1983, he was named Blues Entertainer of the Year by the Blues Foundation. He is the father of blues singer Shemekia Copeland.

In 2017, Copeland was posthumously inducted into the Blues Hall of Fame.

== Career ==
Copeland was born in Haynesville, Louisiana. Influenced by T-Bone Walker, he formed the Dukes of Rhythm in Houston, Texas, and made his recording debut in 1956, signing with Duke Records the following year. Although his early records met with little commercial success, he became a popular touring act over the next two decades.

His early recording career embraced blues, soul and rock and roll. He recorded singles for Mercury, Golden Eagle and All Boy, amongst others. His first single was "Rock 'n' Roll Lily", and he later cut successes such as "Down on Bending Knees" and "Please Let Me Know". For the most part, his singles featured Copeland as a vocalist more than a guitar player.

Driven by disco to rethink his future, he moved to New York City in 1976, and played extensively in Eastern cities. In New York he met a young record producer named Dan Doyle who was instrumental in getting Copeland signed with Rounder Records. Doyle produced Copeland's initial Rounder releases including Copeland Special for which he won a W. C. Handy Award in 1981, and Bringin' It All Back Home (1985). Copeland also recorded with Albert Collins and Robert Cray, winning a Grammy in 1987 for Best Traditional Blues Album, for the album Showdown!.

Touring widely, Copeland appeared at the 1983 Long Beach Blues Festival and the 1988 San Francisco Blues Festival. Copeland also played at the 1985 Montreux Jazz Festival, as a guest with Stevie Ray Vaughan and his band Double Trouble. Vaughan and Copeland performed the Bob Geddins song "Tin Pan Alley" together on Vaughan's compilation album Blues at Sunrise. He also played on the first edition of BRBF (Blues Peer Festival) later that year.

His later years were dogged by ill health due to a congenital heart defect. He died, aged 60, in Columbia-Presbyterian Medical Center, in New York City, from complications of heart surgery for a heart transplanted six months earlier.

Copeland was a resident of Teaneck, New Jersey. His daughter, Shemekia Copeland, established a successful career as a singer. He was also survived by his wife, son and two daughters.

In 2017, Copeland was posthumously inducted into the Blues Hall of Fame.

== Selected recordings ==
- 1981: Copeland Special (Rounder 2025)
- 1982: Make My Home Where I Hang My Hat (Rounder 2030)
- 1983: Texas Twister (Rounder 2040)
- 1985: Bringin' It All Back Home (Rounder 2050)
- 1988: Ain't Nothin' But A Party (Recorded Live) (Rounder 2055)
- 1989: Boom Boom (Rounder 2060)
- 1989: Soul Power (P-Vine Records PCD-2506)
- 1989: Blues Power (P-Vine Records PCD-2509)
- 1992: Flyin' High (Verve 517512)
- 1993: Catch Up with the Blues (Verve 521239)
- 1995: Jungle Swing (Verve 527466)
- 1995: Texas Party (Orbis BLU NC-056)
- 1998: The Crazy Cajun Recordings (Edsel EDCD-581)
- 1999: Honky Tonkin' (Bullseye Blues/Rounder 9621)
- 2002: The Johnny Copeland Collection: Working Man's Blues (Fuel 2000/Varese 302 061 260)
- 2006: Fuel Presents An Introduction To Johnny Copeland (Fuel 2000/Varese 302 061 594)

== See also ==
- List of blues musicians
- List of electric blues musicians
- List of Texas blues musicians
- List of people from Teaneck, New Jersey
