= Adelphi Records =

American independent record label

Adelphi Records is an American independent record label founded in 1968 and incorporated in 1970 by Gene Rosenthal.

== History ==
The label name was crafted by Rosenthal to suggest a combination of the Greek oracle, nearby Adelphi, Maryland, as well as a tip of the hat to a John Fahey song, "The Downfall of the Adelphi Rolling Grist Mill". Extensive field recordings were begun in 1964 and expanded to include film documentation beginning in early/mid 1969, including sessions in Chicago, St. Louis, Memphis and the Mississippi Delta. In the 1970s, the label began issuing folk, jazz and blues-rock albums. The latter were significantly important to the development of that genre. In the mid-1970s, two of Adelphi's biggest selling artists were the Nighthawks and the Rosslyn Mountain Boys. Towards the end of the 1970s the label's sales and growth had significantly expanded. This was particularly marked in the early 1980s, when Adelphi established its wholly owned subsidiary label, Sunsplash Records, predominantly to issue Jamaican reggae performances from the 1982 Reggae Sunsplash Festival. Musician signings continued into the 1990s and, after a short hiatus, resumed in the 2000s with studio sessions in New Orleans by Ken Swartz & The Palace of Sin, and in Silver Spring, Maryland sessions with the Rose Sheehan Group including vocals by Lisa Null.

== Recordings ==
Musicians on that label are (among others) The Nighthawks, Catfish Hodge and Roy Buchanan, (rock); Lenny Breau, Reuben Brown and Richie Cole (jazz); Yellowman, Big Youth and Toots & the Maytals (reggae); Rev. Gary Davis, Gene Johnson, and Rev. Robert Wilkins (blues and spirituals); plus Nathan Beauregard, Roy Book Binder, Roy Buchanan, R. L. Burnside, Gus Cannon, David Honeyboy Edwards, Paul Geremia, Mississippi John Hurt, Backwards Sam Firk, Richard "Hacksaw" Harney, Skip James, Furry Lewis, Bill Blue, Little Brother Montgomery, Charles Tyler and Bukka White (blues), plus Patrick Sky (folk).

== See also ==
- List of record labels - Sunsplash, GENES (pronounced Jenn-ess) Blues Vault Series CDs, Dental Records
