= Lenny Breau =

Canadian-American guitarist (1941–1984)

Background information
- Born: Leonard Harold Breau; August 5, 1941; Auburn, Maine, U.S.
- Origin: Winnipeg, Manitoba, Canada
- Died: August 12, 1984 (aged 43) Los Angeles, California, U.S.
- Genres: Jazz, country
- Occupation: Musician
- Instrument: Guitar
- Years active: 1954–1984
- Labels: RCA, Sound Hole, Adelphi, Genes, Tudor
- Website: lennybreau.com

Leonard Harold Breau (August 5, 1941 – August 12, 1984) was an American-Canadian guitarist. He blended many styles of music, including jazz, country, classical, and flamenco. Inspired by country guitarists like Chet Atkins, Breau used fingerstyle techniques not often used in jazz guitar. By using a seven-string guitar and approaching the guitar like a piano, he opened up possibilities for the instrument.

== Biography ==
=== Early life ===
Breau was born August 5, 1941, in Auburn, Maine, USA and moved with his family to Moncton, New Brunswick, Canada in 1948. His parents, Harold Breau and Betty Cody, were professional country musicians who performed and recorded from the mid-1930s until the mid-1970s. From the mid to late 1940s they played summer engagements in southern New Brunswick, advertising their performances by playing free programs on radio station CKCW Moncton. Lenny began playing guitar at the age of eight. When he was twelve, he started a small band with friends, and by the age of fourteen he was the lead guitarist for his parents' band, billed as "Lone Pine Junior", playing Merle Travis and Chet Atkins instrumentals and occasionally singing. He made his first professional recordings in Westbrook, Maine at Event Records with Al Hawkes at the age of 15 while working as a studio musician. Many of these recordings were released posthumously on the album Boy Wonder.

The Breau family moved to Winnipeg, Manitoba in 1957 and their new band performed around the city and province as the CKY Caravan. Their shows were radio broadcast live on Winnipeg's CKY on Saturday mornings from remote locations.

=== Jazz career ===
Around 1959 Breau left his parents' country band after his father slapped him in the face for incorporating jazz improvisation into his playing with the group. He sought out local jazz musicians, performing at Winnipeg venues Rando Manor and the Stage Door. He met pianist Bob Erlendson, who began teaching him more of the foundations of jazz.

In 1961, Breau had his first professionally recorded jazz session at the age of twenty at Hallmark Studios in Toronto, where he was accompanied by future members of The Band bassist Rick Danko and drummer Levon Helm. The recording would remain unreleased until 2003. In 1962, Breau briefly performed in the Toronto-based jazz group Three with singer and actor Don Francks, and Eon Henstridge on acoustic bass. Three performed in Toronto, Ottawa, and New York City. Their music was featured in the 1962 National Film Board documentary Toronto Jazz. They recorded a live album at the Village Vanguard in New York City and appeared on the Jackie Gleason and Joey Bishop television shows.

Returning to Winnipeg a few months later, Breau became a session guitarist, recording for CBC Radio and CBC Television, and contributed to CBC-TV's Teenbeat, Music Hop, and his own The Lenny Breau Show filmed in Winnipeg. During this period, he met his partner Judi Singh, with whom he had a daughter. In 1963 and 1964, Breau appeared at David Ingram's Fourth Dimension at 2000 Pembina Highway in Fort Garry, a suburb of Winnipeg. Every Sunday night was a party open to all. Other regulars at the club on Sunday nights included Neil Young and his band The Squires, and Randy Bachman, who was heavily influenced by Breau, particularly evident in the jazz guitar style of his The Guess Who hit "Undun".

In 1967, recordings of Breau's playing from The Lenny Breau Show found their way to Chet Atkins. The ensuing friendship resulted in Breau's first two mature solo albums, Guitar Sounds from Lenny Breau and The Velvet Touch of Lenny Breau – Live! on RCA, accompanied by fellow Winnipeggers Ron Halldorson and Reg Kelln. Breau did not record again for nearly 10 years, though he continued to do session work in Winnipeg.

Breau left Winnipeg in 1976 and spent the last few years of his life in the United States, living in Maine, Nashville, Stockton, California, and New York City, eventually settling in Los Angeles in 1983. These years he spent performing, teaching, and writing for Guitar Player magazine. A few more solo albums were issued during his lifetime, in addition to albums recorded with fiddler Buddy Spicher and pedal steel guitarist Buddy Emmons.

Breau had problems with drugs and alcohol beginning in the 1960s, which he managed to control during the last years of his life.

== Death ==
On August 12, 1984, his body was found in the swimming pool at his apartment complex in Los Angeles, California. The coroner reported that Breau had been strangled. Breau's wife, Jewel, was the chief suspect, but she was not charged. He is interred in an unmarked grave at Forest Lawn Memorial Park Cemetery.

== Posthumous honors ==
Many live and "lost" recordings have been issued since Breau's death, and most of his previously released albums have also been reissued. Due to efforts by Randy Bachman of Guitarchives, Paul Kohler of Art of Life Records, Tim Tamashiro of CBC Radio and others, a new generation of listeners has access to his music.

The documentary The Genius of Lenny Breau was produced in 1999 by Breau's daughter, Emily Hughes, and directed by Hughes and John Martin. This Gemini Award-winning film includes interviews with Chet Atkins, Ted Greene, Pat Metheny, George Benson, Leonard Cohen, and Bachman, as well as family members. In the film George Benson says, "He dazzled me with his extraordinary guitar playing ... I wish the world had the opportunity to experience his artistry." A follow-up documentary, The Genius of Lenny Breau Remembered, directed by Hughes, was released in 2018.

The biography One Long Tune: The Life and Music of Lenny Breau by Ron Forbes-Roberts was published in 2006 containing interviews with nearly 200 people and a comprehensive discography.

CBC Radio presented a documentary on Lenny Breau titled On the Trail of Lenny Breau (the title is in reference to Breau's parents' song "On the Trail of the Lonesome Pine"). It was first broadcast on September 13, 2009, as part of a regular weekly program called Inside the Music. It was narrated by Breau's son, Chet. The one-hour feature was produced in Montreal by John Klepko.

Breau was inducted into the Canadian Music Hall of Fame in 1997.

== Technique and guitars ==
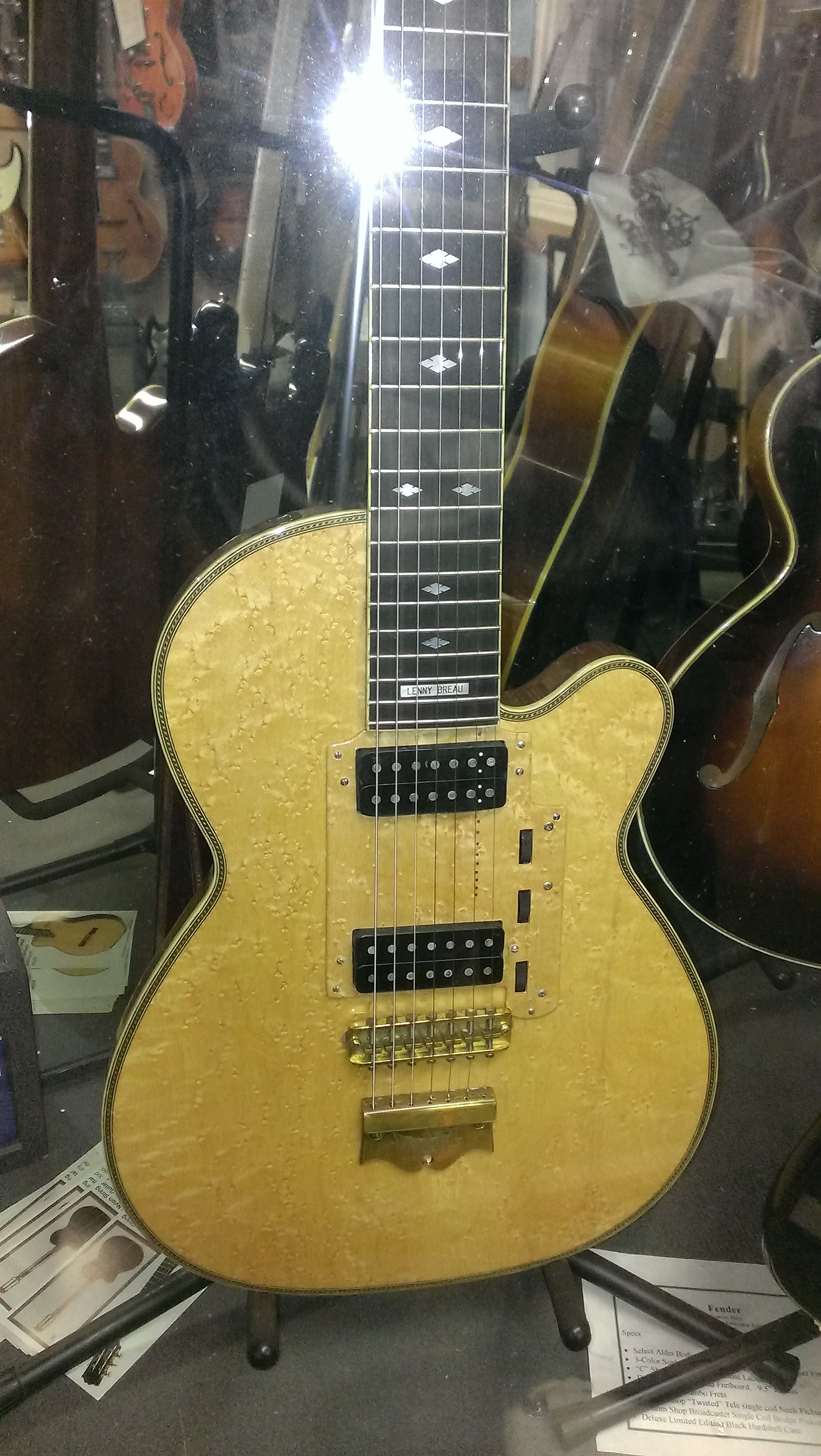
Breau's seven-string electric guitar

Breau's fully matured technique was a combination of Chet Atkins's and Merle Travis's fingerpicking and Sabicas-influenced flamenco, highlighted by right-hand independence and flurries of artificial harmonics. His harmonic sensibilities were a combination of his country roots, classical music, modal music, Indian, and jazz, particularly the work of pianist Bill Evans. Breau often adapted Evans's compositions, such as "Funny Man", for guitar. Breau said in relation to this, "I approach the guitar like a piano. I've reached a point where I transcend the instrument. A lot of the stuff I play on the seven-string guitar is supposed to be technically impossible, but I spent over twenty years figuring it out. I play the guitar like a piano, there's always two things going on at once. I'm thinking melody, but I'm also thinking of a background. I play the accompaniment on the low strings."

He had two custom seven-string guitars made, one classical and one electric. At the time, no company made a string that could be tuned to the high A on his classical guitar. Breau used fishing line of the correct gauge until the La Bella company began making a string for him. The electric guitar was made by Kirk Sand, also with the first string being a high A.

== Discography ==
- Guitar Sounds from Lenny Breau (RCA Victor, 1969)
- The Velvet Touch of Lenny Breau – Live! (RCA Victor, 1969)
- Minors Aloud, Buddy Emmons with Lenny Breau (Flying Fish, 1978)
- Five O'Clock Bells (Adelphi, 1979)
- Lenny Breau (Direct Disk Labs, 1979)
- The Legendary Lenny Breau... Now! (Sound Hole, 1979)
- Standard Brands with Chet Atkins (RCA Victor, 1981)
- Mo' Breau (Adelphi, 1981)
- When Lightn' Strikes (Tudor, 1982)
- Legacy with David Young (Relaxed Rabbit, 1984)
- Quietude with Dave Young (Electric Muse, 1985)
- The Living Room Tapes, Vol. 1 with Brad Terry (Livingroom, 1986)
- Last Sessions (Adelphi, 1988)
- The Living Room Tapes, Vol. 2 with Brad Terry (Musical Heritage Society, 1990)
- Live at Bourbon St. with Dave Young (Guitarchives, 1995)
- Chance Meeting, Tal Farlow with Lenny Breau (Guitarchives, 1997)
- Cabin Fever (Guitarchives, 1997)
- Boy Wonder (Guitarchives, 1998)
- Live at Donte's (String Jazz, 2000)
- Pickin' Cotten with Richard Cotten (Guitarchives, 2001)
- The Hallmark Sessions (Art of Life, 2003)
- The Complete Living Room Tapes with Brad Terry (Art of Life, 2003)
- At the Purple Onion with Don Francks and Eon Henstridge (Art of Life, 2004)
- Mosaic (Guitarchives, 2006)
- LA Bootleg 1984 (Linus Entertainment, 2014)

== See also ==
- Music of Canada
- Canadian Music Hall of Fame
