= Chet Atkins discography =

- Studio albums: 88
- Extended plays: 19 plus
- Live albums: 3
- Compilation albums: 53 plus
- Singles: 113

Chet Atkins' discography is large and diverse. Not only did he release principal studio albums as a solo artist, he was a prolific and much sought-after collaborator. He also played as a sideman on many more. His major collaborations were with Hank Snow, Arthur Fiedler and the Boston Pops Orchestra, The Country All-Stars, The Nashville String Band, Jerry Reed, Merle Travis, Doc Watson, Lenny Breau, Les Paul, Mark Knopfler, Suzy Bogguss, Floyd Cramer, Johnny Gimble, and Tommy Emmanuel. He frequently guested on a track or two with other friends. Several of his recordings won or were nominated for Grammy Awards.

The majority of his releases were on the RCA Victor label with many releases on their budget label RCA Camden, in addition to many compilations and anthologies. He left RCA in 1982 after 36 years and signed with Columbia Records.

His discography as a producer encompasses many albums and singles for a wide range of artists. Atkins produced records for Perry Como, Elvis Presley, Eddy Arnold, Don Gibson, Jim Reeves, Jerry Reed, Skeeter Davis, Connie Smith, Waylon Jennings, Ann-Margret and many others.

== Studio albums ==
=== 1950s ===
Title	Details	Peak positions
Title	Details	US
Chet Atkins' Gallopin' Guitar	Release date: 1953; Label: RCA Victor	—
Stringin' Along with Chet Atkins	Release date: 1953; Label: RCA Victor	—
A Session with Chet Atkins	Release date: December 1954; Label: RCA Victor	—
Stringin' Along with Chet Atkins	Release date: 1955; Label: RCA Victor	—
Chet Atkins in Three Dimensions	Release date: 1955; Label: RCA Victor	—
Finger Style Guitar	Release date: 1956; Label: RCA Victor	—
Chet Atkins at Home	Release date: 1957; Label: RCA Victor	21
Hi-Fi in Focus	Release date: October 1957; Label: RCA Victor	—
Chet Atkins in Hollywood	Release date: July 1959; Label: RCA Victor	—
Hum & Strum Along with Chet Atkins	Release date: August 1959; Label: RCA Victor	—
Mister Guitar	Release date: October 1959; Label: RCA Victor	—
"—" denotes releases that did not chart

=== 1960s ===
Title	Details	Peak chart positions		
Title	Details	US Country	US	US CB
After the Riot at Newport	Release date: 1960; Label: RCA Victor	—N/a	—	—
Teensville	Release date: 1960; Label: RCA Victor	—N/a	16	16
The Other Chet Atkins	Release date: September 1960; Label: RCA Victor	—N/a	—	—
Chet Atkins' Workshop	Release date: December 1960; Label: RCA Victor	—N/a	7	—
The Most Popular Guitar	Release date: May 1961; Label: RCA Victor	—N/a	119	—
Christmas with Chet Atkins	Release date: November 1961; Label: RCA Victor	—N/a	12	—
Chet Atkins Plays Back Home Hymns	Release date: 1962; Label: RCA Victor	—N/a	—	—
Caribbean Guitar	Release date: July 1962; Label: RCA Victor	—N/a	33	27
Down Home	Release date: 1962; Label: RCA Victor	—N/a	31	—
Our Man in Nashville	Release date: December 1962; Label: RCA Victor	—N/a	135	70
Teen Scene	Release date: 1963; Label: RCA Victor	—N/a	93	68
The Guitar Genius	Release date: 1963; Label: RCA Camden	—N/a	—	—
Travelin'	Release date: 1963; Label: RCA Victor	—N/a	—	—
Guitar Country	Release date: 1964; Label: RCA Victor	1	64	—
Progressive Pickin'	Release date: 1964; Label: RCA Victor	—	—	—
My Favorite Guitars	Release date: 1964; Label: RCA Victor	—	—	—
More of That Guitar Country	Release date: 1965; Label: RCA Victor	4	—	—
Chet Atkins Picks on the Beatles	Release date: March 1966; Label: RCA Victor	6	112	63
From Nashville with Love	Release date: 1966; Label: RCA Victor	26	140	—
Music from Nashville, My Home Town	Release date: 1966; Label: RCA Camden	—	—	—
It's a Guitar World	Release date: 1967; Label: RCA Victor	—	148	—
Picks the Best	Release date: 1967; Label: RCA Victor	—	—	—
Class Guitar	Release date: 1967; Label: RCA Victor	26	189	—
Hometown Guitar	Release date: 1968; Label: RCA Victor	17	—	—
Solid Gold 68	Release date: 1968; Label: RCA Victor	18	—	—
Solo Flights	Release date: 1968; Label: RCA Victor	—	184	—
Lover's Guitar	Release date: 1969; Label: RCA Victor	—	—	—
Solid Gold 69	Release date: 1969; Label: RCA Victor	33	150	—
"—" denotes releases that did not chart

=== 1970s ===
Title	Details	Peak chart positions	
Title	Details	US Country	US
Yestergroovin'	Release date: 1970; Label: RCA Victor	—	139
Pickin' My Way	Release date: 1970; Label: RCA Victor	30	—
For the Good Times	Release date: 1971; Label: RCA Victor	17	—
Picks on the Hits	Release date: 1972; Label: RCA Victor	38	—
Alone	Release date: 1973; Label: RCA Victor	42	—
Chet Atkins Picks on Jerry Reed	Release date: 1974; Label: RCA Victor	—	—
The Night Atlanta Burned	Release date: 1975; Label: RCA Victor	30	—
Chet Atkins Goes to the Movies	Release date: 1975; Label: RCA Victor	43	—
Me and My Guitar	Release date: 1977; Label: RCA Victor	50	—
"—" denotes releases that did not chart

=== 1980s–2000s ===
Title	Details	Peak chart positions	
Title	Details	US Country	US
Country After All These Years	Release date: 1981; Label: RCA Victor	—	—
Work It Out with Chet Atkins C.G.P.	Release date: 1983; Label: Columbia Records	64	—
East Tennessee Christmas	Release date: 1983; Label: Columbia Records	—	—
Stay Tuned^{[A]}	Release date: 1985; Label: Columbia Records	—	145
Street Dreams	Release date: 1986; Label: Columbia Records	—	—
Sails	Release date: 1987; Label: Columbia Records	—	—
Chet Atkins, C.G.P.	Release date: 1988; Label: Columbia Records	—	—
Read My Licks	Release date: 1994; Label: Columbia Records	—	—
Almost Alone	Release date: May 1996; Label: Columbia Records	74	—
Solo Sessions	Release date: 2003; Label: CGP Records	—	—
"—" denotes releases that did not chart

== Collaborations ==
Title	Details	Peak chart positions		
Title	Details	US Country	US	CAN
Reminiscing (with Hank Snow)	Release date: August 1964; Label: RCA Records	—	—	—
The Pops Goes Country (with Arthur Fiedler and the Boston Pops)	Release date: 1966; Label: RCA Records	36	62	—
Chet Atkins Picks on the Pops (with Arthur Fiedler and the Boston Pops)	Release date: 1969; Label: RCA Records	—	160	—
Me and Jerry (with Jerry Reed)	Release date: 1970; Label: RCA Records	13	—	—
C.B. Atkins & C.E. Snow by Special Request (with C.E. (Hank) Snow)	Release date: 1970; Label: RCA Records	—	—	—
Me and Chet (with Jerry Reed)	Release date: 1971; Label: RCA Records	24	—	—
Chet, Floyd & Boots (with Floyd Cramer and Boots Randolph)	Release date: 1972; Label: RCA Camden	—	—	—
American Salute (with Arthur Fiedler and the Boston Pops)	Release date: 1972; Label: RCA Records	—	—	—
Superpickers	Release date: 1974; Label: RCA Victor	—	—	—
The Atkins – Travis Traveling Show (with Merle Travis)	Release date: 1974; Label: RCA Records	30	—	—
Chester & Lester (with Les Paul)	Release date: 1976; Label: RCA Victor	11	172	—
Chet, Floyd & Danny (with Floyd Cramer and Danny Davis)	Release date: 1977; Label: RCA Victor	46	—	—
Guitar Monsters (with Les Paul)	Release date: 1978; Label: RCA Records	27	—	—
First Nashville Guitar Quartet (with Liona Boyd, John Knowles and John Pell)	Release date: 1979; Label: RCA Records	—	—	—
Reflections (with Doc Watson)	Release date: 1980; Label: RCA Records	—	—	—
Standard Brands (with Lenny Breau)	Release date: 1981; Label: RCA Records	—	—	—
Neck and Neck (with Mark Knopfler)	Release date: 1990; Label: Columbia Records	27	127	71
Sneakin' Around (with Jerry Reed)	Release date: 1992; Label: Columbia Records	68	—	—
The Gingham Dog and the Calico Cat (with Amy Grant)	Release date: 1993; Label: Madacy Entertainment	—	—	—
Simpatico (with Suzy Bogguss)	Release date: October 18, 1994; Label: Liberty Records	55	—	—
The Day Finger Pickers Took Over the World (with Tommy Emmanuel)	Release date: March 11, 1997; Label: Sony Music Entertainment	—	—	—
"—" denotes releases that did not chart

== Live albums ==
Title	Details	Peak positions
Title	Details	US Country
In Concert	Release date: 1975; Label: RCA Victor	—
And Then Came Chet Atkins	Release date: 1979; Label: RCA Victor	—
The Best of Chet on the Road — Live	Release date: 1980; Label: RCA Victor	43
"—" denotes releases that did not chart

== With The Country All-Stars ==
Title	Details
String Dustin'	Release date: 1953; Label: RCA Victor
Jazz from the Hills	Release date: June 28, 1994; Label: Bear Family Records

== With The Nashville String Band ==
Title	Details
The Nashville String Band	Release date: 1969; Label: RCA Victor
Down Home	Release date: 1970; Label: RCA Victor
Strung Up	Release date: 1971; Label: RCA Victor
Identified!	Release date: 1971; Label: RCA Victor
The Bandit	Release date: 1972; Label: RCA Victor
World's Greatest Melodies	Release date: 1972; Label: RCA Victor

== Instructional ==
Title	Details
Play Guitar with Chet Atkins	Release date: 1968; Label: Dolton Records
Chet Atkins Guitar Method Volume 1 & 2	Release date: 1971; Label: F.A.M.E.

== Compilation albums ==
Title	Details	Peak positions
Title	Details	US Country
Chet Atkins Plays Great Movie Themes	Release date: 1961; Label: RCA Victor	—
The Guitar Genius	Release date: 1963; Label: RCA Camden	—
The Best of Chet Atkins	Release date: 1964; Label: RCA Victor	—
The Early Years of Chet Atkins & His Guitar	Release date: 1964; Label: RCA Camden	—
The Best of Chet Atkins, Vol. 2	Release date: 1966; Label: RCA Victor	—
Chet	Release date: 1967; Label: RCA Camden	—
Chet All the Way	Release date: 1968; Label: RCA Victor	—
Relaxin' with Chet	Release date: 1969; Label: RCA Camden	—
Country Pickin'	Release date: 1971; Label: Pickwick Records	—
Mr. Atkins - Guitar Picker	Release date: 1971; Label: RCA Camden	—
This Is Chet Atkins	Release date: 1971; Label: RCA Victor	30
Now and... Then	Release date: 1972; Label: RCA Victor	40
Finger Pickin' Good	Release date: 1972; Label: RCA Camden	—
Nashville Gold	Release date: 1972; Label: RCA Victor	—
Discover Japan	Release date: 1973; Label: RCA Victor	—
Famous Country Music Makers	Release date: 1975; Label: RCA Victor	—
The Golden Guitar of Chet Atkins	Release date: 1975; Label: RCA Victor	—
The Best of Chet Atkins & Friends	Release date: 1976; Label: RCA Victor	25
Love Letters	Release date: 1977; Label: RCA Camden	—
A Legendary Performer	Release date: 1977; Label: RCA Victor	—
Country Music	Release date: 1981; Label: Time Life	—
Solid Gold Guitar	Release date: 1982; Label: RCA Victor	—
Guitar Pickin' Man	Release date: 1983; Label: Cambra Records	—
Great Hits of the Past	Release date: 1983; Label: RCA Victor	—
Tennessee Guitar Man	Release date: 1984; Label: Pair Records	—
A Man & His Guitar	Release date: 1984; Label: RCA Victor	—
Collectors Series	Release date: 1985; Label: RCA Victor	—
Guitar for All Seasons	Release date: 1985; Label: Pair Records	—
20 of the Best	Release date: 1986; Label: RCA Victor	—
Pickin' on Country	Release date: 1988; Label: Pair Records	—
Masters of the Guitar: Together (with Les Paul)	Release date: 1989; Label: Pair Records	—
Pickin' the Hits	Release date: 1989; Label: Pair Records	—
The Magic of Chet Atkins	Release date: 1990; Label: Heartland Music	—
Country Gems	Release date: 1990; Label: Pair Records	—
The Romantic Guitar	Release date: 1991; Label: RCA Special Products	—
The RCA Years	Release date: 1992; Label: RCA Victor	—
Galloping Guitar: The Early Years	Release date: 1993; Label: Bear Family Records	—
The Essential Chet Atkins	Release date: 1996; Label: RCA Victor	—
Masters	Release date: 1998; Label: Eagle Records	—
Super Hits	Release date: 1998; Label: RCA Victor	—
The Guitar Genius/Relaxin' with Chet/ Nashville Gold	Release date: 2000; Label: RCA Camden	42
Guitar Legend: The RCA Years	Release date: 2000; Label: Buddah Records	—
Guitar Man	Release date: 2000; Label: RCA Camden	—
RCA Country Legends: Chet Atkins	Release date: 2001; Label: Buddah Records	—
The Master and His Music	Release date: 2001; Label: Buddah Records	—
Chet Picks on the Grammys	Release date: 2002; Label: Columbia Records	—
Tribute to Bluegrass	Release date: 2002; Label: BMG	—
The Best of Chet Atkins	Release date: 2003; Label: BMG	—
Legendary	Release date: 2003; Label: BMG International	—
Mr. Guitar: The Complete Recordings 1955-1960	Release date: 2004; Label: Bear Family Records	—
I've Been Working on the Guitar: The Legend Begins	Release date: 2004; Label: Country Stars	—
High Rockin' Swing	Release date: 2004; Label: Universe	—
Early Chet Atkins	Release date: 2004; Label: Country Routes	—
The Essential Chet Atkins: The Columbia Years	Release date: August 4, 2004; Label: Columbia Records	—
Carter Sisters and Mother Maybelle with Chet Atkins	Release date: 2005; Label: Country Routes	—
The Nashville Jump	Release date: 2005; Label: Xtra	—
Chet Atkins with the Carter Sisters and Mother Maybelle 1949	Release date: 2005; Label: Country Routes	—
Eclectic Guitar	Release date: March 19, 2007; Label: El	—
The Essential Chet Atkins	Release date: 2007; Label: Legacy Recordings	—
The Early Years 1946–1957	Release date: 2007; Label: JSP Records	—
The Complete RCA Victor & Columbia Christmas Recordings	Release date: 2019; Label: Real Gone Music	—
"—" denotes releases that did not chart

== Singles ==
=== 1940s ===
Year	Single
1946	"Guitar Blues"
1947	"Canned Heat"
1947	"Standing Room Only"
1948	"Bug Dance"
1948	"I Know When I'm Blue"
1948	"Dizzy String"
1948	"I'm Pickin' the Blues"
1949	"Money Marbles and Chalk"
1949	"Barber Shop Rag"
1949	"Telling My Troubles to My Old Guitar"
1949	"Centipede Boogie"

=== 1950s ===
Year	Single	Peak chart positions		Album
Year	Single	US Country	US	Album
1950	"One More Chance"	—	—	—N/a
1950	"Main Street Breakdown"	—	—	Stringin' Along
1950	"Boogie Man Boogie"	—	—	Stringin' Along
1950	"Confusin'"	—	—	—N/a
1951	"Indian Love Call"	—	—	Stringin' Along
1951	"Mountain Melody"	—	—	—N/a
1951	"My Crazy Heart"	—	—	—N/a
1951	"Crazy Rhythm"	—	—	—N/a
1951	"In the Mood"	—	—	Finger Style Guitar
1952	"Rainbow"	—	—	Mr. Guitar
1952	"Spanish Fandango"	—	—	—N/a
1952	"Meet Mister Callaghan"	—	—	In Hollywood
1952	"Tennessee Rag"	—	—	—N/a
1952	"Galloping on the Guitar"	—	—	Gallopin' Guitar
1952	"St. Louis Blues"	—	—	Gallopin' Guitar
1952	"Black Mountain Rag"	—	—	Gallopin' Guitar
1952	"Imagination"	—	—	Gallopin' Guitar
1952	"Midnight"	—	—	—N/a
1952	"It Goes Like This (That Funny Melody)"	—	—	—N/a
1952	"Guitar Polka"	—	—	—N/a
1953	"Fiddle Patch"	—	—	—N/a
1953	"Fig Leaf Rag"	—	—	—N/a
1953	"What's the Reason (I'm Not Pleasin' You)"	—	—	—N/a
1953	"Country Gentleman"	—	—	Mr. Guitar
1953	"Three O'Clock in the Morning"	—	—	—N/a
1953	"Barbershop Rag"	—	—	—N/a
1954	"Wildwood Flower"	—	—	—N/a
1954	"Georgia's Camp Meeting"	—	—	—N/a
1954	"Downhill Drag"	—	—	—N/a
1954	"Mr. Misery"	—	—	—N/a
1954	"Mr. Sandman"	13	—	—N/a
1954	"Silver Bell" (with Hank Snow)	15	—	—N/a
1955	"Hey Mister Guitar"	—	—	—N/a
1955	"Somebody Stole My Gal"	—	—	—N/a
1955	"Vacation Train"	—	—	—N/a
1955	"Christmas Carols"	—	—	—N/a
1955	"Poor People of Paris (Jean's Song)"	—	52	—N/a
1956	"Cecilia"	—	—	—N/a
1956	"Reminiscing" (with Hank Snow)	—	—	—N/a
1957	"Trambone"	—	—	Down Home
1957	"Tricky"	—	—	—N/a
1957	"Martinique"	—	—	—N/a
1957	"Hidden Charm"	—	—	Guitar Genius
1959	"Boo Boo Stick Beat"	—	49	Teensville
1959	"One Mint Julep"	—	82	Teensville
1959	"Teensville"	—	73	Teensville
"—" denotes releases that did not chart

=== 1960s ===
Year	Single	Peak chart positions		Album
Year	Single	US Country	US	Album
1960	"Slinkey"	—	—	Mr. Guitar
1960	"Theme from 'The Dark at the Top of the Stairs'"	—	103	—N/a
1961	"Hot Mocking Bird"	—	—	Workshop
1961	"Man of Mystery"	—	—	—N/a
1961	"Jingle Bell Rock"	—	106	Christmas
1962	"Down Home"	—	—	Our Man in Nashville
1963	"Waitin' for the Evening Train" (with Anita Kerr)	—	—	—N/a
1963	"San Antonio Rose"	—	—	—N/a
1963	"Wildwood Flower"	—	—	—N/a
1964	"Freight Train"	—	—	Guitar Country
1965	"Travelin'"	—	—	My Favorite Guitars
1965	"Yakety Axe"	4	98	More of That Guitar Country
1966	"From Nashville with Love"	—	132	From Nashville with Love
1966	"Tennessee Waltz"	—	—	Pop Goes to Country
1966	"Prissy"	30	—	—N/a
1967	"Charlie Brown"	—	—	This Is Chet Atkins
1967	"Chet's Tune"	—	—	Solo Flights
1968	"Blue Angel"	—	—	Hometown Guitar
1968	"Mrs. Robinson"	—	—	Solid Gold 68
1969	"Those Were the Days"	—	—	Lover's Guitar
1969	"Ode to Billy Joe"	—	—	Pickin' on the Pops
1969	"Caribbean"	—	—	Nashville String Band
"—" denotes releases that did not chart

=== 1970s ===
Year	Single	Peak chart positions		Album
Year	Single	US Country	CAN Country	Album
1970	"Difficult"	—	—	By Special Request
1970	"Love Beads"	—	—	—N/a
1970	"Steeplechase Lane"	—	—	Yestergroovin'
1970	"Strollin'"	—	—	Identified
1970	"Cannonball Rag"	—	—	Me & Jerry
1971	"Snowbird"	—	—	For the Good Times
1971	"Happy Ending"	—	—	Strung Up
1971	"Black Magic Woman"	—	—	—N/a
1971	"Jingle Bell Rock"	—	—	Christmas
1972	"Bandera"	—	—	Bandit
1972	"Red White and Blue Medley"	—	—	—N/a
1972	"Battle Hymn of Republic"	—	—	World's Greatest Melodies
1973	"Somewhere My Love"	—	—	—N/a
1973	"Fiddlin' Around"	75	—	Superpickers
1974	"Is Anything Better"	—	—	—N/a
1974	"Dizzy Fingers"	—	—	—N/a
1975	"Night Atlanta Burned"	77	—	The Night Atlanta Burned
1975	"Senora"	—	—	—N/a
1976	"Frog Kissin'"	40	36	Best of Chet Atkins & Friends
1976	"Moonglow"	—	—	Chester & Lester
1976	"Terry on the Turnpike"	—	—	Best of Chet Atkins & Friends
1977	"Four in the Morning"	—	—	Chet Floyd & Danny
1977	"Me and My Guitar"	—	—	Me and My Guitar
1978	"I'm Your Greatest Fan"	—	—	Guitar Monsters
1979	"Love Song of Pepe Sanchez"	—	—	First Nashville Guitar Quartet
"—" denotes releases that did not chart

=== 1980s–1990s ===
Year	Single	Peak chart positions		Album
Year	Single	US Country	CAN Country	Album
1980	"Blind Willie"	83	—	Best of Chet on the Road
1980	"I Can Hear Kentucky Callin' Me"	83	—	Country After All These Years
1980	"Tennessee Rag"	—	—	Reflections
1981	"Orange Blossom Special"	—	—	Country After All These Years
1983	"Run Don't Wait"	—	—	—N/a
1985	"Boot and the Stone"	—	—	Stay Tuned
1985	"Please Stay Tuned"	—	—	Stay Tuned
1986	"Official Beach Music"	—	—	Street Dreams
1988	"I Can't Say Goodbye"	—	—	Chet Atkins, C.G.P.
1990	"Poor Boy Blues" (with Mark Knopfler)	—	92	Neck & Neck
1996	"I Still Write Your Name in the Snow"	—	—	Almost Alone
"—" denotes releases that did not chart

=== Guest singles ===
Year	Single	Peak positions	Album
Year	Single	US Country	Album
1983	"We Didn't See a Thing" (Ray Charles and George Jones with Chet Atkins)	6	Friendship

== Music videos ==
Year	Video	Director
1990	"Poor Boy Blues" (with Mark Knopfler)	David Hogan
1992	"The Claw" (with Jerry Reed)	Deaton-Flanigen
1994	"One More for the Road" (with Suzy Bogguss)	Deaton-Flanigen

== Notes ==
- A Stay Tuned also peaked at number 12 on Top Jazz Albums.

== See also ==
- Inductees of the Country Music Hall of Fame (1973 Inductee)
- Country Music Association
