= Solid Gold =

Solid Gold may refer to:

- The property of being made entirely out of gold, rather than merely having a plating of that metal.

== Art and entertainment ==
=== Music ===
==== Bands and labels ====
- Solid Gold (band), American indie electronic band
- Solid Gold Cadillac, British jazz-rock group
- Solid Gold Chartbusters, collaboration between Guy Pratt and Jimmy Cauty
- Solid Gold Records, Canadian record label

==== Albums ====
- Solid Gold (album), a 1981 album by Gang of Four
- Solid Gold: 30 Golden Hits, compilation album by James Brown
- Solid Gold EP, a 2016 extended play by Canadian singer Nikki Yanofsky
- Chet Atkins's Solid Gold series
  - Solid Gold 68, the thirty-fifth studio album
  - Solid Gold 69, the thirty-eighth studio album
  - Solid Gold 70, the fortieth studio album
- Solid Gold Chipmunks, compilation music album by Alvin and the Chipmunks, released in 1988
- Solid Gold Hits, compilation album by Beastie Boys, released in 2005

==== Songs ====
- "Solid Gold" (Dionne Warwick song), 1980
- "Solid Gold" (Pnau song), 2019
- "Solid Gold" (Delta Goodrem song), 2020
- "Solid Gold", by Eagles of Death Metal Death by Sexy, 2006
- "Solid Gold", by Fanny from Mothers Pride, 1973, and covered by Keith Moon
- "Solid Gold", by The Darkness from Pinewood Smile, 2017
- "Solid Gold", by Scottish singer Nicholas McDonald from In the Arms of an Angel, 2013
- "Solid Gold", by English rock band Status Quo from Heavy Traffic, 2002
- "Solid Gold", by English band Turbowolf, 2014
- "Solid Gold", by electronic band The Golden Filter, 2009

=== Radio ===
- Solid Gold (radio), a former New Zealand radio network
- Solid Gold Gem, a former United Kingdom radio station

=== Television ===
- Solid Gold (TV series), an American syndicated television series that ran from 1980 to 1988
- Jade Solid Gold, a Hong Kong music television series that has been running since 1981

== Other uses ==
- Solid Gold, the name of an American breeding ram selected for imprinting
- Solid Gold series, five Infocom text adventure games updated with in-game hints, among other improvements
