= Stringin' Along with Chet Atkins =

Stringin' Along with Chet Atkins is the name of two albums:

- Stringin' Along with Chet Atkins (1953 album)
- Stringin' Along with Chet Atkins (1955 album)
