= And Then Came Chet Atkins =

Live album by Chet Atkins
- Released: 1979
- Recorded: 10 and 11 December 1977 in the Olympia Theatre, Paris, France
- Genre: Country
- Label: RCA Victor

Chet Atkins chronology
First Nashville Guitar Quartet (1979)	And Then Came Chet Atkins (1979)	Reflections (1980)

Professional ratings
Review scores
Source	Rating
Allmusic	(no review) link

And Then Came Chet Atkins is a live album by guitarist Chet Atkins, released in 1979.

== Track listing ==
=== Side one ===
1. "Wheels" (Norman Petty) – 1:40
2. "Vincent" (Don McLean) – 2:45
3. "All Thumbs" (Mark Casstevens) – 2:20
4. "Copper Kettle" (Albert Frank Beddoe) – 2:43
5. "Bill Cheatham" (Arr. Chet Atkins, Rick Foster) – 2:03

=== Side two ===
1. "Cascade" (Gene Slone) – 2:26
2. "You'd Be So Nice to Come Home To" (Cole Porter) – 3:48
3. "Snowbird" (Gene MacLellan) – 2:25
4. "Dizzy Fingers" (Edward E. Confrey) – 2:35
5. "Yakety Axe" (Spider Rich, Boots Randolph) – 1:53
6. "Peanut Vendor" (Moises Simons, L. Wolfe Gilbert, Marion Sunshine) – 3:05

=== Side three ===
1. "Autumn Leaves" (Joseph Kosma, Jacques Prévert, Johnny Mercer) – 3:12
2. "When You Wish upon a Star" (Leigh Harline, Ned Washington) – 2:05
3. "Blue Angel" (Nato Lima) – 2:15
4. "Recuerdos de la Alhambra" (Francisco Tárrega) – 3:37
5. "A Beatles Medley":

a. If I Fell (Lennon-McCartney) - 1:05
b. For No One (Lennon-McCartney) – 0:55
c. Something (George Harrison) – 0:30
d. Lady Madonna (Lennon-McCartney) – 1:05

=== Side four ===
1. "Charade" (Henry Mancini) – 2:12
2. "Black Mountain Rag" (Tommy Magnese) – 3:11
3. "Drown in My Own Tears" (Henry Glover) – 2:27
4. "Drive In" (Jerry Reed) – 2:03
5. "Medley":

a. Trambone (Chet Atkins) - 0:43
b. Hello! Ma Baby (Joseph E. Howard, Ida Emerson) – 0:22
c. I'll See You in My Dreams (Isham Jones, Gus Kahn) – 0:30
d. The Poor People of Paris (Marguerite Monnot) – 0:50
e. Mister Sandman (Pat Ballard) 0:35
f. Freight Train (James-Williams) 0:55

== Personnel ==
- Chet Atkins – guitar
- Henry Strezlecki – bass
- Paul Yandell – guitar
- Randy Goodrum - piano
- Larry Londin - drums
