= Relaxin' with Chet =

Relaxin' With Chet

Studio album by Chet Atkins
- Released: 1969
- Genre: Country, pop
- Label: Camden

Chet Atkins chronology
Hometown Guitar	Relaxin' With Chet	Lover's Guitar

Relaxin' With Chet (1969) is a compilation by Chet Atkins.

== Track listing ==
Side 1:

1. "Blues for Dr. Joe"
2. "Sophisticated Lady"
3. "Yesterdays"
4. "Say Si Si"
5. "Vilia"

Side 2:

1. "Martha"
2. "In the Chapel in the Moonlight"
3. "Czardas"
4. "Nagasaki"
5. "April in Portugal"

== Personnel ==
- Chet Atkins – guitar
