= Superpickers =

Studio album by Chet Atkins
- Released: 1974
- Recorded: Nashville, Tennessee
- Genre: Country
- Length: 31:14
- Label: RCA Victor
- Producer: Bob Ferguson, Chet Atkins

Chet Atkins chronology
Alone (1973)	Superpickers (1974)	The Atkins - Travis Traveling Show (1974)

Chet Atkins collaborations chronology
World's Greatest Melodies (1972)	Superpickers (1974)	The Atkins - Travis Traveling Show (1974)

Superpickers is a 1974 album by guitarist Chet Atkins and top recording session players in Nashville, Tennessee. The track, "Fiddlin' Around", reached No. 75 on the Billboard Country Singles chart.

== Reissues ==
Superpickers was reissued on CD in 1998 along with Picks on the Hits by One Way Records.

== Reception ==
Professional ratings
Review scores
Source	Rating
AllMusic	3/5 stars
AllMusic (reissue)	3/5 stars

Critic William Ruhlmann of AllMusic wrote of the album, "Atkins joins together with an A-list of Nashville session musicians for a set of picking extravaganzas... Atkins himself is goaded into some wonderful playing as a result, and Superpickers is one of his best albums."

== Track listing ==
=== Side one ===
1. "Paramaribo" (John D. Loudermilk) – 2:27
2. "Fiddlin' Around" (Johnny Gimble) – 3:06
3. "Mr. Bojangles" (Jerry Jeff Walker) – 4:35
4. "Beef and Biscuits" (Mat Camison) – 2:35
5. "Sweet Dreams" (Don Gibson) – 2:44

=== Side two ===
1. "Just Another Rag" (Atkins, Jerry Reed Hubbard) – 2:38
2. "Canadian Pacific" (Ray Griff) – 3:50
3. "City of New Orleans" (Steve Goodman) – 3:26
4. "Bells of Saint Mary's" (Doug Tringer) – 2:51
5. "Are You from Dixie ('Cause I'm from Dixie Too)" (George L. Cobb, Jack Yellen) – 3:02

== Personnel ==
- Chet Atkins – guitar
- Johnny Gimble – fiddle
- Buddy Spicher – fiddle
- Buddy Harman – drums
- Charlie McCoy – harmonica
- Weldon Myrick – pedal steel guitar
- Jerry Shook – guitar
- Farrell Morris – percussion
- Hargus "Pig" Robbins – piano
- Larrie Londin – drums
- Paul Yandell – guitar, ukulele
- Henry Strzelecki – double bass
- Bobby Thompson – banjo, guitar

== See also ==
- The Nashville A-Team
