= Sails (album) =

Studio album by Chet Atkins
- Released: June 2, 1987
- Genre: Country, jazz
- Length: 45:03
- Label: Columbia
- Producer: Chet Atkins, David Hungate

Chet Atkins chronology
Street Dreams (1986)	Sails (1987)	C.G.P. (1988)

Sails is the fifty-fourth studio album by Chet Atkins. It was released in 1987 by Columbia Records. Sails follows in the 1980s' vein of Chet Atkins' releases with a smooth jazz and new age atmosphere.

== Reception ==
Professional ratings
Review scores
Source	Rating
Allmusic	2.5/5 stars

Allmusic music critic Richard S. Ginell wrote of the album; "this recording veers well across the line into new age wallowing of the most innocuous kind... this is not one of the better Atkins Columbia discs."

== Track listing ==
1. "Sails" (Hall) – 4:20
2. "Why Worry" (Mark Knopfler) – 6:23
3. "Sometime, Someplace" (David Hungate, Randy McCormick) – 4:59
4. "Up in My Treehouse" (Walker) – 3:52
5. "Waltz for the Lonely" (Chet Atkins, Randy Goodrum) – 3:01
6. "Laffin' at Life" (Atkins, Daryyl Dybka, David Hungate) – 5:30
7. "On a Roll" (Atkins, Dybka, Paul Yandell) – 5:21
8. "My Song" (Keith Jarrett) – 5:08
9. "Love Letters" (Dybka) – 3:09
10. "Wobegon (The Way It Used to Be)" (Atkins) – 3:20

== Personnel ==
- Chet Atkins - guitar, banjo
- Darryl Dybka - keyboards
- David Hungate - bass
- Earl Klugh - guitar
- Mark Knopfler - guitar
- Mike Lawler - keyboards
- Clayton Ivey - keyboards
- Randy McCormick - keyboards
- Billy Joe Walker, Jr. - guitar
- Terry McMillan - harmonica, percussion
- Paul Yandell - guitar
- Millard Green - guitar
- Larrie Londin - drums, percussion
- Mark Hammond - percussion, drum programming
- Bob Mater - drums
- Jim Horn - horns
- Mike Haynes - horns
- Baba Ram Dave - sitar
- Aristotle Onassid - bouzouki
- Dave Humphries - drum programming

== Production notes ==
- Strings arranged by Bergen White
- Horns arranged by Bergen White and Darryl Dybka
- Mixed by Dave Palmer and John Mills
- Engineered by John Mills and Tom Singers
- Mastered by Denny Purcell
- Design by Bill Johnson and Jeff Morris
