= Christmas with Chet Atkins =

1961 album

Studio album by Chet Atkins
- Released: November 1961
- Recorded: Nashville, TN
- Genre: Christmas music
- Length: 31:11
- Label: RCA Victor LSP-2423 (Stereo)
- Producer: Chet Atkins

Chet Atkins chronology
The Most Popular Guitar (1961)	Christmas with Chet Atkins (1961)	Chet Atkins Plays Back Home Hymns (1962)

Alternative Cover

Christmas with Chet Atkins is the sixteenth studio album recorded by Chet Atkins. It is his first Christmas album.

"White Christmas" contains Atkins' first recorded use of chordal harmonics.

== Reception ==
Professional ratings
Review scores
Source	Rating
Allmusic	4.5/5 stars
Country Standard Time	(no rating)

Writing for Allmusic, critic Matthew Greenwald wrote "His version of "Silver Bells" is, quite simply, one of the best versions of the standard ever, and possibly one of Atkins' most arresting performances of all time. The album is overall, criminally underrated... Gorgeous." Brian Wahlert of Country Standard Time wrote "This is the perfect background music for sipping hot chocolate in front of the fireplace and falling asleep in the warm glow of the Christmas tree lights while the snow falls outside."

The album charted for 11 weeks on Billboard's Best Bets For Christmas albums chart, peaking at No. 12 on the week ending December 20, 1969.

== Reissues ==
- In 1997, Christmas with Chet Atkins was reissued on CD by Razor & Tie. It differs from the original vinyl pressing by substituting alternate takes for several tracks and has an alternate cover.
- In 2004, RCA reissued Christmas with Chet Atkins on CD.
- In 2019, Real Gone Music released The Complete RCA & Columbia Christmas Recordings, a 2-CD set gathering all the material from Christmas with Chet Atkins as well as Atkins' 1983 release East Tennessee Christmas.

== Track listing ==
=== Side one ===
1. "Jingle Bell Rock" (Joe Beal, Jim Boothe) – 1:51
2. "Winter Wonderland" (Felix Bernard, Richard B. Smith) – 2:49
3. "Jolly Old St. Nicholas" (Traditional) – 2:13 (Emily Huntington Miller)
4. "White Christmas" (Irving Berlin) – 2:20
5. "Blue Christmas" (Billy Hayes, Jay Johnson) – 2:53
6. "Jingle Bells" (James Lord Pierpont) – 1:50
7. "Silver Bells" (Jay Livingston, Ray Evans) – 2:09

=== Side two ===
1. "The Little Drummer Boy" (Katherine K. Davis, Henry Onorati, Harry Simeone) – 2:29
2. "Medley: The Coventry Carol/God Rest Ye, Merry Gentlemen" (Traditional) – 3:25
3. "The First Noel" (William B. Sandys) – 1:46
4. "Hark! The Herald Angels Sing" (Felix Mendelssohn, Charles Wesley) – 1:55
5. "O Come All Ye Faithful" (Frederick Oakeley, John Francis Wade) – 2:19
6. "Deck the Halls" (Traditional) – 1:11 (John Ceiriog Hughes)
7. "Silent Night" (Josef Mohr, Franz Xaver Gruber) – 2:01

== Personnel ==
- Chet Atkins – guitar
- The Anita Kerr Singers – background chorus

== Charts ==
Chart (1961)	Peak position
US Best Bets for Christmas (Billboard)	12
