= Caribbean Guitar =

Studio album by Chet Atkins
- Released: July 1962
- Recorded: Nashville, TN
- Genres: Country, pop
- Length: 29:16
- Labels: RCA Victor LPM-2549 (Mono), LSP-2549 (Stereo)
- Producer: Chet Atkins

Chet Atkins chronology
Chet Atkins Plays Back Home Hymns (1962)	Caribbean Guitar (1962)	Down Home (1962)

Caribbean Guitar is the eighteenth studio album recorded by American guitarist Chet Atkins, released in 1962.

== Note ==
Atkins' treatment of "Banana Boat Song" is based on The Tarriers' version, not Harry Belafonte's more famous rendition.

== Chart performance ==
The album debuted on CashBox Top Albums (Stereo) on November third that year, peaking at No. 27 during an eight-week stay on the chart.

The album debuted on the Billboard's Top Albums on October thirteenth, peaking at No. 33 during a nine-week stay on the chart.

== Reception ==
Professional ratings
Review scores
Source	Rating
Allmusic	2.5/5 stars
New Record Mirror	3/5 stars

Writing for Allmusic, critic Richard S. Ginell wrote of the album "Chet Atkins's versatility and curiosity have covered a lot of ground, and you would think that his talent would be able to encompass calypso and other Caribbean styles as well. Alas, he isn't given much of a chance here."

== Reissues ==
- In 1995, Travelin' and Caribbean Guitar were reissued on CD by One Way Records.

== Track listing ==
=== Side one ===
1. "Mayan Dance" (Antonio Lauro) – 2:08
2. "Yellow Bird" (Marilyn Bergman, Michael Keith, Norman Luboff) – 2:00
3. "Wild Orchids" (Boudleaux Bryant) – 2:34
4. "Bandit" (Alfredo Ricardo do Nascimento, John Turner, Michael Carr) – 2:06
5. "Jungle Dream" (Natalicio Moreyra Lima) – 2:36
6. "The Banana Boat Song (Day-O)" (Erik Darling, Bob Carey, Alan Arkin) – 2:24

=== Side two ===
1. "Montego Bay" (Marvin Moore, Bernie Wayne) – 2:20
2. "Theme from Come September" (Bobby Darin) – 2:22
3. "Moon Over Miami" (Joe Burke, Edgar Leslie) – 2:45
4. "Come To The Mardi Gras" (Max Bulhoes, Milton de Oliveira) – 2:27
5. "The Enchanted Sea" (Frank Metis, Randy Starr) – 2:19
6. "Temptation" (Nacio Herb Brown, Arthur Freed) – 3:04

== Charts ==
Chart (1962)	Peak position
US Billboard Top Albums	33
US Cashbox Top Albums (Stereo)	27

== Personnel ==
- Chet Atkins – guitar
- Karl Garvin – trumpet
- Bill Porter – engineer
