= Chet Atkins Picks on Jerry Reed =

Studio album by Chet Atkins
- Released: 1974
- Recorded: RCA "Nashville Sound" Studio, Nashville, TN
- Genre: Country
- Length: 26:42
- Label: RCA Victor APL1-0545
- Producer: Chet Atkins, Jerry Reed, Bob Ferguson

Chet Atkins chronology
The Atkins - Travis Traveling Show (1974)	Chet Atkins Picks on Jerry Reed (1974)	The Night Atlanta Burned (1975)

Professional ratings
Review scores
Source	Rating
Allmusic	4/5 stars

Chet Atkins Picks on Jerry Reed is the 45th studio album of instrumental guitar versions of ten Jerry Reed compositions performed primarily by American guitarist Chet Atkins (two songs with Reed), released in 1974.

Atkins plays guitar for the 10 Jerry Reed songs. The version of "Steeplechase Lane" found here is different from that previously recorded on Yestergroovin'. Although the two guitarists are pictured on the original cover, Jerry performs on only two songs: "Squirrely" and "Mister Lucky".

Chet Atkins Picks on Jerry Reed has been out of print in recent years and has not been re-released on CD.

== Reception ==
Writing for Allmusic, critic Richard S. Ginell wrote of the album "All of these tunes give Atkins plenty of room to display some fancy fingerpicking, classical technique, and even a bit of gentle sustained rock guitar on his instruments...Since the vast majority of country albums then were considered disposable goods by the Nashville machine, this — like many a fine Atkins record — will be difficult to locate."

== Track listing ==
All songs written by Jerry R. Hubbard

=== Side one ===
1. "I'll Say She Does" – 2:33
2. "East Wind" – 2:51
3. "Funky Junk" – 2:15
4. "Remembering" – 2:43
5. "Down Home" – 2:40

=== Side two ===
1. "Baby's Coming Home" – 2:26
2. "The Early Dawn" – 2:24
3. "Steeplechase Lane" – 2:26
4. "Mister Lucky" – 4:00
5. "Squirrely" – 2:24

== Personnel ==
- Chet Atkins – guitar
- Larrie Londin – drums, percussion
- Paul Yandell – guitar
- Pete Wade – guitar
- Jerry Reed – guitar on "Squirrely" and "Mister Lucky", liner notes
- Steve Schaffer – bass
- Haywood Bishop – drums
- Jimmy Capps – guitar
