= Girl Friend of the Whirling Dervish =

Song
- Released: 1938
- Genre: Novelty song
- Label: Warner Bros. Inc
- Composer(s): Harry Warren
- Lyricist(s): Al Dubin & Johnny Mercer

"(The) Girl Friend of the Whirling Dervish" is a novelty song written by Harry Warren, Al Dubin, and Johnny Mercer. In an Orientalist jazz musical style and with a Turquesque confusion of Islamic, Indian, and Western cultural motifs, it recounts the amorous adventures of the eponymous unfaithful sweetheart of an oblivious Whirling Dervish amid a number of musicians who compete for her affections.

The song first appeared in the 1938 Warner Brothers film Garden of the Moon, where it was performed by John Payne, Johnnie Davis, Jerry Colonna, and Joe Venuti and His Swing Cats, once as a short instrumental and once as a lengthy vocal version in an elaborate Busby Berkeley production number featuring a turban-wearing band and the heavily-mustached Colonna as a veiled "girl friend."

== In popular culture ==
Guy Lombardo and His Royal Canadians had a minor hit with the song in 1938.
On October 28, 1938, the Midwestern jazz novelty group, The Hoosier Hot Shots, recorded a curtailed version of the song as a single on the Vocalion label (No. 04571).

In 1940 the song was used in the Warner Brothers Porky Pig cartoon "Ali-Baba Bound"; two years later, it was used as the opening theme of the Bugs Bunny cartoon "Case of the Missing Hare" over the credits and up to the first view of Ala Bahma. Both cartoons are now in the public domain.

In 1960 the song was recorded by lounge artist Martin Denny for his album Exotic Percussion - The Exotic Sounds of Martin Denny.

In 1962 country guitarist Chet Atkins released a Nashville Sound instrumental version on his album Down Home.

Connie Stevens included it on her 1962 CD From Me To You.

The Muppet Show featured the song in the Arabian Nights themed Marty Feldman episode in 1980.

Susannah McCorkle recorded it in 1976 for her first album "The Music of Harry Warren".

An instrumental version of the song is in the 1991 film For The Boys. The soundtrack album constrains a version with choral vocals.
