= Solo Sessions (Chet Atkins album) =

Studio album by Chet Atkins
- Released: 2003
- Recorded: Chet Atkins' home studio
- Genres: Country, pop
- Length: 79:59
- Label: CGP Records

Chet Atkins chronology
Chet Picks on the Grammys (2002)	Solo Sessions (2003)	The Essential Chet Atkins: The Columbia Years (2004)

Professional ratings
Review scores
Source	Rating
About.com	not rated link

Solo Sessions is the fifty-eighth and final studio album by Chet Atkins, released in 2003. It is his first posthumous release of solo guitar recordings after his death in 2001.

== History ==
All the songs are previously unreleased and were recorded by Atkins in his home studio. Atkins' grandson Jonathan, longtime sideman Paul Yandell and engineer Mike Poston undertook the task of cataloging, organizing and releasing this two-CD set. Some of the songs were unique and new versions of previously released songs.

== Track listing ==
=== Disc one ===
1. "Ol' Man River" (Oscar Hammerstein, Jerome Kern) – 3:12
2. "La Vie En Rose" (David, Piaf. Louiguy) – 2:26
3. "In The Good Old Summertime" (Traditional) – 2:10
4. "Sukiyaki" (Ei, Nakamura) – 3:03
5. "The Cascades" (Joplin, Schuller) – 2:46
6. "America the Beautiful" (Traditional) – 2:05
7. "I Only Have Eyes For You" (Dubin, Warren) – 3:05
8. "Lost Love Medley: I Can't Help It" (Hank Williams) / "If I Should Lose You" (Rainger, Robin) – 2:48
9. "Hi Lilli, Hi Lo" (Deutsch, Kaper) – 2:40
10. "Danny Boy" (Traditional) – 3:21
11. "Bye Bye Blackbird" (Mort Dixon, Ray Henderson) – 3:10
12. "Arkansas Traveler" (Traditional) – 2:54
13. "Shadow Waltz" (Dubin, Warren) – 2:58
14. "In The Garden" (Traditional) – 2:20

=== Disc two ===
1. "Mr. Bojangles" (Jerry Jeff Walker) – 2:42
2. "Polka Dots and Moonbeams" (Jimmy Burke, Jimmy Van Heusen) – 2:23
3. "As Time Goes By" (Corder, Douglas, Francis) – 3:16
4. "Walk, Don't Run" (Johnny Smith) – 2:32
5. "Mystery Train" (Junior Parker, Sam Phillips) – 1:28
6. "But Not for Me" (George Gershwin, Ira Gershwin) – 3:34
7. "Magnetic Rag" (Scott Joplin) – 3:13
8. "To 'B' or Not to 'B" (Chet Atkins) – 3:38
9. "Dear Ol' Dadi" (Chet Atkins) – 2:29
10. "Cowboy Medley:
  1. "Cattle Call" (Tex Owens)
  2. "I'm An Old Cowhand (From The Rio Grand)" (Johnny Mercer)
  3. "Wagon Wheels" (Rose, Hill)
  4. "Back In The Saddle Again" (Autry, Whitley)
  5. "Happy Trails To You" (Dale Evans) – 4:55
11. "Yesterdays" (Jerome Kern, Otto Harbach) – 2:58
12. "Embraceable You" (Gershwin, Gershwin) – 2:59
13. "Bicycle Built For Two" (Traditional) – 2:51
14. "Amazing Grace" (Traditional) – 1:52
