= Sail Along, Silv'ry Moon =

Song by Harry Tobias and Percy Wenrich

Single by Bing Crosby
- Released: 1937
- Genre: Traditional pop
- Length: 2:37
- Label: Decca
- Songwriters: Harry Tobias, Percy Wenrich

"Sail Along, Silv'ry Moon"

Single by Billy Vaughn

from the album Sail Along, Silv'ry Moon
- B-side: "Raunchy"
- Released: October 1957
- Recorded: 1957
- Genre: Instrumental
- Length: 2:07
- Label: Dot
- Songwriters: Harry Tobias, Percy Wenrich

Billy Vaughn singles chronology
"Raunchy" (1957)	"Sail Along, Silv'ry Moon" (1957)	"Tumbling Tumbleweeds" (1958)

"Sail Along, Silv'ry Moon" is a song written by Harry Tobias and Percy Wenrich in 1937 and performed by Bing Crosby. It reached #4 on the U.S. pop chart in 1937. Outside of the US, the song peaked at #1 in Canada, Germany and Norway.

== Other charting versions ==
Billy Vaughn released an instrumental version of the song which went to #5 on the U.S. pop chart in December 1957 and #1 in Germany and in Canada in 1957. The following year, the song went #1 in Norway and made #4 in Australia. It ranked #6 on Billboard's Year-End top 50 singles of 1958.

== Other versions ==
- Jerry Blaine and His Stream Line Rhythm released a version of the song as a single in 1938, but it did not chart.
- Richard Himber and His Seven Stylists released a version of the song as the B-side to their 1938 single "There's a Gold Mine in the Sky".
- Gene Autry released a version of the song as the B-side to his 1946 single "There's a Gold Mine in the Sky".
- Karen Chandler and Her Jacks released a version of the song as a single in 1958, but it did not chart.
- Andy Williams released a version of the song on his 1959 album, Two Time Winners.
- Sil Austin released a version of the song on his 1961 album, Golden Saxophone Hits.
- Slim Whitman released a version of the song on his 1961 album, Just Call Me Lonesome.
- Frankie Carle, His Piano and Orchestra released a version of the song as a medley with the song "East of the Sun (and West of the Moon)" on their 1962 album, Honky-Tonk Hits By The Dozen.
- Jimmy C. Newman released a version of the song on his 1962 album, Jimmy Newman.
- Martin Denny released a version of the song on his 1964 album, Hawaii Tattoo.
- Billy May and His Orchestra released a version of the song on their 1972 album, As You Remember Them: Great Instrumentals: Volume 2.
- Chet Atkins featuring Danny Davis and the Nashville Brass released a version of the song on their 1976 album, The Best of Chet Atkins & Friends.
- Ace Cannon released a version of the song on his 1980 album, Golden Classics.
- André Rieu and Johann Strauss Orchestra released a version on the album Romantic Moments II
- Simons recorded a cover of this song, which aired in the swedish television-program dansbandsdags.
- De Kermisklanten released a version on single in 1974.
