= Eclectic Guitar =

Compilation album by Chet Atkins
- Released: Mar 19, 2007
- Recorded: 1954–1956
- Genre: Country, jazz
- Length: 51:19
- Label: El
- Producer: Chet Atkins, Stephen H. Sholes

Chet Atkins chronology
The Essential Chet Atkins (2007)	Eclectic Guitar (2007)	The Early Years 1946-1957 (2007)

Eclectic Guitar is a compilation recording by American guitarist Chet Atkins, released in 2007 on the El label.

== History ==
The single disc contains 20 tracks from the three-year period of 1954 through 1956 representing Atkins' work in a variety of styles; mostly pop, jazz, and classical with very little country music. Most of the songs are solo performances.

The cover photo had been previously used for the 1961 reissue of A Session with Chet Atkins.

Professional ratings
Review scores
Source	Rating
Allmusic	4/5 stars

== Track listing ==
1. "Sunrise Serenade" (Carle) – 2:47
2. "Honeysuckle Rose" (Andy Razaf, Fats Waller) – 2:41
3. "Caravan" (Duke Ellington, Irving Mills, Juan Tizol) – 3:28
4. "Mister Sandman" (Pat Ballard) – 2:18
5. "Tenderly" (Walter Gross, Jack Lawrence) – 3:25
6. "Minute Waltz" (Frédéric Chopin) – 1:47
7. "Intermezzo" (Robert Henning, Heinz Provost) – 2:33
8. "Minuet/Prelude" (Bach) – 2:30
9. "Little Rock Getaway" (Carl Sigman, Joe Sullivan) – 2:19
10. "Ochi Chornya (Dark Eyes)" (Traditional) – 2:46
11. "La Golondrina" (Traditional) – 2:48
12. "Indian Love Call" (Rudolf Friml, Oscar Hammerstein, Otto Harbach) – 2:58
13. "St. Louis Blues" (W. C. Handy) – 3:01
14. "Alice Blue Gown" (Joseph McCarthy, Harry Tierney) – 2:22
15. "Malaguena" (Ernesto Lecuona) – 2:48
16. "Gavotte in D" (François Joseph Gossec) – 1:43
17. "Waltz in A Flat" (Johannes Brahms) – 1:50
18. "Adelita" (Tarrega) – 1:39
19. "Petite Walz" (Traditional) – 2:50
20. "Liza (All the Clouds'll Roll Away)" (George Gershwin, Ira Gershwin, Gus Kahn) – 2:46

== Personnel ==
- Chet Atkins – guitar
- Ray Edenton – guitar
- Poppa John Gordy – piano, celeste
- Buddy Harman – drums
- Marvin Hughes – piano, celeste
- Ernie Newton – bass
- Dale Potter – fiddle
