= Stay Tuned (Chet Atkins album) =

Studio album by Chet Atkins
- Released: May 5, 1985
- Recorded: 1985
- Studio: A&M Studios (Hollywood, CA); Room 335 (Los Angeles, CA); CA Workshop (Nashville, TN); The Sound Shop (Nashville, TN)
- Genre: Country, jazz
- Length: 36:43
- Label: Columbia
- Producer: Chet Atkins, George Benson, David Hungate

Chet Atkins chronology
| Work It out with Chet Atkins C.G.P. (1983) | Stay Tuned (1985) | Street Dreams (1986) |

Stay Tuned is a studio album by Chet Atkins, released in 1985 on Columbia Records. His guests included George Benson, Mark Knopfler, Steve Lukather, and Earl Klugh.

Stay Tuned was the first "Nashville" album promoted specifically to compact disc purchasers.

"Cosmic Square Dance" won the 1985 Grammy for Best Country Instrumental Performance.

The album peaked at No. 145 on the Billboard 200.

== Reception ==
Professional ratings
Review scores
| Source | Rating |
|---|---|
| AllMusic | 3/5 stars |
| The Encyclopedia of Popular Music | 3/5 stars |
| MusicHound Folk: The Essential Album Guide | 3/5 stars |
| The Rolling Stone Album Guide | 3/5 stars |

AllMusic critic Cub Koda wrote of the album: "Atkins' tone is, as usual, faultless, and his playing superb. If the 'meetings' don't always come off, it's usually due to the overzealousness of the other guitar players.... All in all, a good modern-day Chet Atkins album, but not the place to start a collection." The Rolling Stone Album Guide wrote that "while the tunes are formulaic, the playing is impressive."

== Track listing ==
1. "Sunrise" (G. Benson, Randy Goodrum) – 4:06
2. "Please Stay Tuned" (Atkins, Paul Yandell) – 4:01
3. "Quiet Eyes" (Russell) – 3:33
4. "A Mouse in the House" (Moss) – 3:52
5. "Some Leather and Lace" (Atkins, Yandell) – 3:56
6. "The Cricket Ballet" (Darryl Dybka) – 3:30
7. "Cosmic Square Dance" (Atkins, Mark Knopfler, Paul Yandell) – 4:14
8. "The Boot and the Stone" (Dybka) – 3:57
9. "Tap Room" – 4:08
10. "If I Should Lose You" (Ralph Rainger, Leo Robin) – 1:26

== Personnel ==
- Chet Atkins – guitar
- George Benson – guitar
- Larry Carlton – guitar
- Earl Klugh – guitar
- Mark Knopfler – guitar
- Steve Lukather – guitar
- Brent Mason – guitar
- Dean Parks – guitar
- Paul Yandell – guitar
- David Hungate – bass guitar
- Mark O'Connor – fiddle
- Boots Randolph – saxophone
- Jim Horn – horns
- Don Sheffield – horns
- Darryl Dybka – keyboards
- Randy Goodrum – keyboards
- Clayton Ivey – keyboards
- Shane Keister – keyboards
- Mark Hammond – drums
- Larrie Londin – drums
- Jeff Porcaro – drums
- Paulinho Da Costa – percussion
- Terry McMillan – percussion

== Production notes ==
- Bergen White – string and horn arrangement
- George Butler – remix supervision
- Mike Poston – engineering
- Ernie Winfrey – string section engineering
- Don Hahn – remix engineering
- Joe Borja – engineering assistance
- Bernie Grundman – mastering
