= Street Dreams (Chet Atkins album) =

Studio album by Chet Atkins
- Released: 1986
- Genres: Country, jazz
- Length: 38:23
- Label: Columbia
- Producers: Ronnie Foster, Darryl Dybka

Chet Atkins chronology
Stay Tuned (1985)	Street Dreams (1986)	Sails (1987)

Street Dreams is the fifty-third studio album by American guitarist Chet Atkins, released in 1986 on the Columbia label.

Having previously recorded some of Darryl Dybka's compositions, Atkins asked Dybka to help create a jazzier musical direction. Dybka arranged, produced, and composed many of the songs on this release.

== Reception ==
Professional ratings
Review scores
Source	Rating
Allmusic	2.5/5 stars

Allmusic music critic Cub Koda wrote of the album; "This 1986 album has a production sheen to it that makes it totally of its time, and it doesn't necessarily wear too well because of it. Too many synthesizers and contemporary touches simply detract from the main reason you bought it in the first place—to hear Chet Atkins play his patented fluid guitar. Although Atkins usually sounds wonderful on gut-string guitar, here his sound is pinched and curiously restrained..."

== Track listing ==
All tracks are written by Darryl Dybka, unless otherwise noted.

No.	Title	Writer(s)	Length
1.	"Spats ‘n’ Hats"		3:59
2.	"(Like A) Crystal in the Light"		3:31
3.	"The Official Beach Music"		3:48
4.	"Street Dreams"		4:33
5.	"(If You’ll) Stay a Little Longer"	John Hall, Paul Yandell	4:18
6.	"Classical Gas"	Mason Williams	3:52
7.	"The Last Farewell"	Ron A. Webster, Roger Whitaker	4:14
8.	"Alisha"		3:43
9.	"The Homecoming Anthem"		4:17
10.	"Honolulu Blue"	Chet Atkins, John Knowles	2:08
Total length:			38:23

== Personnel ==
- Chet Atkins – guitar, arrangements
- Bruce Bolen – guitar
- Lee Ritenour – guitar
- Paul Yandell – guitar
- David Hungate – bass guitar
- Abraham Laboriel – bass guitar
- Mark O'Connor – fiddle
- Jim Horn – saxophone
- Tom Scott – Lyricon
- Darryl Dybka – keyboards, drum programming
- Ronnie Foster – keyboards, percussion
- Ricky Lawson – drums
- Harvey Mason – drums
- Terry McMillan – drums, percussion
- Paulinho Da Costa – percussion
- E. Granat – first violin
- Alexander Horuath – violin
- Kenneth Burward-Hoy – viola
- Stephen Erdody – cello
- Eddie del Barrio – keyboard arrangements
- George del Barrio – string arrangements

== Production notes ==
- Keith Seppanen – engineering
- Rick Clifford – engineering assistance
- Mike Poston – overdub engineering
- David Palmer – remix engineering
- Denny Purcell – mastering
- Bill Johnson – art direction
- Larry Williams – photography
