= Guitar Monsters =

Studio album by Chet Atkins and Les Paul
- Released: 1978
- Genre: Country, jazz
- Length: 31:16
- Label: RCA Victor APL1-2786
- Producer: Bob Ferguson

Chet Atkins chronology
Chet Floyd & Danny (1977)	Guitar Monsters (1978)	First Nashville Guitar Quartet (1979)

Guitar Monsters is an album by Chet Atkins and Les Paul, released by RCA Records in 1978. It is their second collaboration, after their Grammy Award-winning release Chester & Lester.

At the Grammy Awards of 1978, Guitar Monsters was nominated for the Grammy Award for Best Instrumental Performance.

== Reception ==
Professional ratings
Review scores
Source	Rating
Allmusic	4.5/5 stars

Writing for Allmusic, critic Richard S. Ginell recalled the success of the duo's first collaboration and wrote of this album "the results are just about as marvelous."

== Reissues ==
- Guitar Monsters and Chester and Lester were released on CD in 1989 by Pair Records as Masters of the Guitar: Together with some tracks omitted.
- Both albums were re-released with the two albums intact on one CD in 1998 by One Way Records.

== Track listing ==
=== Side one ===
1. "Limehouse Blues" (Philip Braham, Douglas Furber) - 2:50
2. "I Want to Be Happy" (Caesar, Youmans) - 3:41
3. "Over the Rainbow" (Harold Arlen, E.Y. Harburg) - 2:41
4. "Meditation" (Antonio Carlos Jobim) - 2:32
5. "Lazy River" (Hoagy Carmichael, Sidney Arodin ) - 3:01
6. "I'm Your Greatest Fan" - 3:49

=== Side two ===
1. "It Don't Mean a Thing (If it Ain't Got That Swing)" (Duke Ellington, Irving Mills) - 2:58
2. "I Surrender Dear" (Harry Barris, Gordon Clifford) - 4:04
3. "Brazil" (Ary Barroso, Russell) - 2:41
4. "Give My Love to Nell" (Traditional) - 2:53
5. "Hot Toddy" (Ralph Flanagan) - 3:00

== Personnel ==
- Chet Atkins – guitar
- Les Paul – guitar
- Joe Osborne – bass
- Buddy Harman, Larrie Londin, Randy Hauser – drums
- Randy Goodrum – piano
- Paul Yandell – rhythm guitar
