= Chet Atkins Goes to the Movies =

Studio album by Chet Atkins
- Released: 1975
- Recorded: RCA's "Nashville Sound" Studio, Nashville, TN
- Genre: Country, pop
- Label: RCA Victor
- Producer: Chet Atkins, Bob Ferguson

Chet Atkins chronology
The Night Atlanta Burned (1975)	Chet Atkins Goes to the Movies (1975)	Chester & Lester (1976)

Chet Atkins Goes to the Movies is the forty-seventh studio album by guitarist Chet Atkins, released in 1975.

Chet won the 1976 Best Country Instrumental Performance Grammy for "The Entertainer". He and Jerry Reed were also nominated that year for their performance of "Colonel Bogey".

== Track listing ==
=== Side one ===
1. "Paramount on Parade" (Janis, King) – 0:19
2. "My Own True Love" – 3:00
3. "Everybody's Talkin'" (Fred Neil) – 2:56
4. "Terry Theme from Limelight" (Chaplin) – 2:50
5. "Emily" (Johnny Mandel, Johnny Mercer) – 2:28
6. "Charade" (Henry Mancini, Johnny Mercer) – 3:46
7. "Paramount on Parade" (Janis, King) – 2:25

=== Side two ===
1. "Solace" (Scott Joplin) – 2:49
2. "The Entertainer" (Scott Joplin) – 2:17
3. "Over the Rainbow" (Harold Arlen, E.Y. Harburg) – 2:55
4. "Somewhere, My Love" (Maurice Jarre, Paul Francis Webster) – 2:33
5. "A Man and a Woman" – 2:41
6. "Merrily We Roll Along" – 0:26

== Personnel ==
- Chet Atkins – guitar, banjo, violin, viola
- Paul Yandell – guitar, high-strung guitar
- Boyce Hawkins – organ
- Larrie Londin – drums
- John Christopher – guitar
- Terry McMillan – harmonica
- Bobby Wood – piano
- Beegie Cruser – piano
- Mike Leach – bass
- Tommy Cogbill – drums
- Billy Sanford – guitar
- Hayward Bishop – drums
- Ray Stevens – ARP

Production notes

- Produced by Chet Atkins, Bob Ferguson
- Chuck Seitz – engineer
- Bubba Campbell – recording technician
- Roy Shockley – recording technician
- Ray Butts – recording technician
- John Knowles – arranger ("A Man and a Woman", "Merrily We Roll Along", "Solace", "The Entertainer")
- Lenny Breau – arranger ("Emily")
