= The Best of Chet Atkins & Friends =

Greatest hits album by Chet Atkins
- Released: 1976
- Genre: Country, pop
- Label: RCA Records

Chet Atkins chronology
Chester and Lester (1976)	The Best of Chet Atkins & Friends (1976)	Me and My Guitar (1977)

The Best of Chet Atkins & Friends is a compilation recording by American guitarist Chet Atkins, released in 1976. It peaked at number 25 on the Billboard Country Albums charts in 1977.

Atkins collaborated with a number of artists, and this 1976 LP release contains a broad spectrum, including previously unreleased songs with Dolly Parton and Boots Randolph. Other guests include Johnny Gimble, Arthur Fiedler, Lenny Breau, Jerry Reed, Merle Travis, Les Paul, and Hank Snow.

Professional ratings
Review scores
Source	Rating
Allmusic	4.5/5 stars

== Major releases ==
Format	Imprint	Catalogue No.	Territory	Date
LP	RCA	APL1-1985	United States	1976
LP	Music for Pleasure	MFP 5766	United Kingdom	1976
Cassette, CD	RCA	RCA #61093	United States	May 23, 1995

== Track listing ==
=== Side one ===
1. "Terry on the Turnpike" (Atkins) (with Boots Randolph)
2. "Sail Along Silv'ry Moon" (Harry Tobias, Percy Wenrich)
3. "Sweet Georgia Brown" (Ben Bernie, Kenneth Casey, Maceo Pinkard) (with Lenny Breau)
4. "Avalon" (Buddy DeSylva, Al Jolson, Vincent Rose) (with Les Paul)
5. "The Ballad of New Orleans/Sugarfoot Rag" (Driftwood) (with the Boston Pops Orchestra)

=== Side two ===
1. "Do I Ever Cross Your Mind" (Dolly Parton) (with Dolly Parton)
2. "Frog Kissin'" (with Ray Stevens)
3. "Twichy" (Jerry Reed Hubbard) (with Jerry Reed)
4. "Fiddlin' Around" (Johnny Gimble) (with Johnny Gimble)
5. "Poison Love" (Elmer Laird) (with Hank Snow)
6. "I'll See You in My Dreams" – (Gus Kahn, Isham Jones) (with Merle Travis)

== Personnel ==
- Chet Atkins – guitar
- Dolly Parton – vocals & guitar on "Do I Ever Cross Your Mind"
- Boots Randolph – saxophone
- Charlie McCoy – harmonica
- Lenny Breau – guitar
- Hank Snow – guitar
- Jerry Reed – guitar
- Ray Stevens – vocals
- Les Paul – guitar
- Merle Travis – guitar
- Danny Davis and The Nashville Brass – trumpet, brass section
- Johnny Gimble – fiddle
