= The Atkins–Travis Traveling Show =

The Atkins-Travis Traveling Show

Studio album by Chet Atkins and Merle Travis
- Released: 1974
- Recorded: January 15–16, 1974, Los Angeles, California
- Genre: Country, bluegrass
- Length: 29:56
- Label: RCA Victor
- Producer: Jerry Reed

Chet Atkins chronology
Superpickers (1974)	The Atkins-Travis Traveling Show (1974)	Chet Atkins Picks on Jerry Reed (1974)

Chet Atkins Collaborations chronology
Superpickers (1974)	The Atkins-Travis Traveling Show (1974)	Chester & Lester (1976)

The Atkins–Travis Traveling Show is the title of a recording by guitarists Chet Atkins and Merle Travis, released by RCA Records in 1974. The two musical legends team up on 11 songs, earning the 1974 Grammy Award for Best Country Instrumental Performance. Rehearsed in Nashville, this album was recorded in California.

== Reception ==
Professional ratings
Review scores
Source	Rating
Allmusic	3.5/5 stars

Writing for Allmusic, critic Richie Unterberger wrote of the album "It was a refreshingly plain production for a time when the country scene in which Atkins and Travis had started as youngsters was getting pretty slick. At the same time, there's a lack of ambition to the endeavor that makes it a secondary curiosity in both men's catalogs, and certainly not one of the top places to start as showcases for their formidable abilities."

== Reissues ==
- Originally released on RCA, it was reissued on CD by BMG in 2002.

== Track listing ==
=== Side one ===
1. "Down South Blues" (Atkins, Travis) – 4:36
2. "Mutual Admiration" (Shel Silverstein) – 2:10
3. "Muskrat Ramble" (Ray Gilbert, Kid Ory) – 2:33
4. "If I Had You" (Jimmy Campbell, Reginald Connelly, Ted Shapiro) – 3:07
5. "Cannonball Rag" (Travis) – 1:22
6. "Boogie For Cecil" (Atkins, Travis) – 2:29

=== Side two ===
1. "Is There Anything Better Than This" (Shel Silverstein) – 2:30
2. "Dance of the Golden Rod" (Travis) – 1:53
3. "Who's Sorry Now?" (Ted Snyder, Bert Kalmar, Harry Ruby) – 2:10
4. "Nine Pound Hammer" (Travis) – 2:53
5. "I'll See You in My Dreams" (Isham Jones, Gus Kahn) – 3:51

== Personnel ==
- Chet Atkins – guitar, vocals
- Merle Travis – guitar, vocals
- Jerry Reed – guitar
- Bill Vandevort – engineer
- Mickey Crofford – engineer
