= Me and My Guitar (Chet Atkins album) =

Studio album by Chet Atkins
- Released: 1977
- Recorded: RCA Studio A (Nashville, Tennessee)
- Genre: Country
- Length: 30:41
- Label: RCA Victor APL1-2405

Chet Atkins chronology
The Best of Chet Atkins & Friends (1976)	Me and My Guitar (1977)	Chet Floyd & Danny (1977)

Professional ratings
Review scores
Source	Rating
AllMusic	4/5 stars
The Rolling Stone Record Guide	1/5 stars

Me and My Guitar is the forty-eighth studio album by American guitarist Chet Atkins. It was nominated for the Best Country & Western Instrumental Performance Grammy in 1978. Atkins joined Floyd Cramer and Danny Davis that same year to produce Chet Floyd & Danny which was also nominated.

Lenny Breau appears on "Long, Long Ago" and "You'd Be So Nice to Come Home To".

== Reissues ==
- Me and My Guitar was reissued by One Way Records (35122) combined with First Nashville Guitar Quartet.

== Track listing ==
=== Side one ===
1. "Cascade" (Gene Slone) – 2:23
2. "West Memphis Serenade" (Bobby Braddock)– 2:35
3. "Long, Long Ago" (Thomas Bayly) – 2:53
4. "All Thumbs" (Mark Casstevens) – 2:20
5. "Vincent (Don McLean) – 3:12
6. "Me and My Guitar" (James Taylor) – 2:40

=== Side two ===
1. "Struttin'" (Jerry Reed) – 2:31
2. "You'd Be So Nice to Come Home To" (Cole Porter) – 3:10
3. "David's Dance" (Odell Martin) – 3:07
4. "A Song for Anna" (Andre Popp) – 2:42
5. "My Little Waltz" (Atkins, John Knowles) – 2:25

== Personnel ==
- Chet Atkins – guitar, resonator guitar, vocals
- Lenny Breau – guitar, bass
- John Baker – percussion
- Paul Yandell – guitar
- Mark Casstevens – guitar
- Larrie Londin – drums
- Hargus "Pig" Robbins – piano
- Randy Goodrum – clavinet, synthesizer, Utility keyboard
- Bob Moore – bass
- Henry Styzelecki – bass
- Ray Stevens – piano
- Bobby Wood – piano, organ
- Tommy Cogbill – bass
- Hayward Bishop – drums
- John Christopher – guitar
- Billy Sanford – guitar
- John Baker – drums
- Floyd Cramer – piano
- Dave Kirby – guitar
- Joe Osborn – bass
- Jimmy Isbell – drums

Production notes

- Engineered by Bill Vandervort, Bill Harris, Chuck Seitz, Al Pachucki
- Mastered by Randy King
