= Alone (Chet Atkins album) =

Studio album LP by Chet Atkins
- Released: 1973
- Recorded: RCA "Nashville Sound" Studio, Nashville, Tennessee
- Genre: Country; pop
- Label: RCA Victor

Chet Atkins chronology
World's Greatest Melodies (1972)	Alone (1973)	Superpickers (1974)

Professional ratings
Review scores
Source	Rating
AllMusic	2.5/5 stars

Alone is the 44th studio album by the American guitarist Chet Atkins. It peaked at number 42 on the Billboard country albums chart. Atkins was diagnosed with colon cancer during the recording of this album.

== Reissues ==
In 1989, RCA/Mobile Fidelity Sound Labs reissued Pickin' My Way, Chet Atkins in Hollywood and Alone in a double CD set.

== Track listing ==
=== Side one ===
1. "Hawaiian Slack Key" – 2:35
2. "The Claw" (Jerry Reed) – 2:16
3. "Spanish Fandango" (Traditional) – 2:01
4. "Flop Eared Mule and Other Classics"
5. "Over the Waves" (Juventino Rosas) – 2:30
6. "Just as I Am" (William B. Bradbury, Charlotte Elliott) – 1:25

=== Side two ===
1. "Take Five" (Paul Desmond) – 2:28
2. "Smile" (Charlie Chaplin) – 2:42
3. "Blue Finger" (Jerry Reed) – 2:36
4. "Me and Bobby McGee" (Fred Foster, Kris Kristofferson) – 2:30
5. "Londonderry Air" (arrangement: Atkins) – 2:58
6. "The Watkins Man" – 2:47

== Personnel ==
- Chet Atkins – guitar, arrangements

Production notes

- Paul Yandell – arrangement – with Chet Atkins ("The Watkins Man")
- Jorge Morel – arrangement ("Take Five")
- Bill Vandevort – engineer
- Mike Shockley – recording technician
- Jimmy Moore – cover photo
