= It's a Guitar World =

Studio album by Chet Atkins
- Released: 1967
- Recorded: RCA 'Nashville Sound' Studios, Nashville, TN
- Genre: Country, pop
- Length: 31:15
- Label: RCA Victor LSP-3728 (Stereo), LPM-3728 (Mono)
- Producer: Chet Atkins, Bob Ferguson, Felton Jarvis

Chet Atkins chronology
Music from Nashville, My Home Town (1966)	It's a Guitar World (1967)	Chet (1967)

It's a Guitar World is the thirty-first studio album by guitarist Chet Atkins, released in 1966.

Atkins serves up a mixture of late 1960s pop and world music. Harihar Rao adds sitar to "January in Bombay" and "Ranjana" with some interesting and also somewhat mystifying results. Recent hits by The Tijuana Brass - "A Taste of Honey" and "What Now My Love" also get covered here. It reached No. 19 on the Billboard Country Albums chart and No. 148 on the Billboard Pop Albums chart.

== Reception ==
Professional ratings
Review scores
Source	Rating
Allmusic	3/5 stars

Writing for Allmusic, critic Richard S. Ginell wrote of the reissue "This attractive LP from Chester Burton Atkins purports to leap international boundaries, but for the most part, he stays right home in Nashville."

== Reissues ==
- It's a Guitar World was reissued on CD along with My Favorite Guitars in 1995 on One Way Records.

== Track listing ==
=== Side one ===
1. "What'd I Say" (Ray Charles) – 2:13
2. "Cast Your Fate to the Wind" (Vince Guaraldi) – 2:23
3. "Lara's Theme (from Doctor Zhivago)" (Maurice Jarre) – 3:10
4. "A Taste of Honey" (Ric Marlow, Bobby Scott) – 2:41
5. "For No One" (Lennon–McCartney) – 2:07

=== Side two ===
1. "Pickin' Nashville" (Joe Layne, Jimmy Wilkerson) – 2:21
2. "January in Bombay" (Atkins) – 3:05
3. "Ranjana" (Harihar Rao) – 2:20
4. "Et Maintenant (What Now My Love)" (Gilbert Bécaud, Pierre Delanoë, Carl Sigman) – 3:15
5. "'Na voce, 'na chitarra e'o poco 'e luna" (Ugo Calise, C. A. Rosa) – 2:22
6. "Star-Time" (Leon Payne) – 2:15
7. "Siempre" (Sonny Osborne) – 2:52

== Personnel ==
- Chet Atkins – guitar
- Harihar Rao – sitar

== Charts ==
Chart (1967)	Peak position
US Billboard Top LPs	148
US Billboard Top Country LPs	19
