= Music from Nashville, My Home Town =

Studio album by Chet Atkins
- Released: 1966
- Recorded: RCA Victor 'Nashville Sound' Studios, Nashville, TN
- Genre: Country, pop
- Label: RCA Camden

Chet Atkins chronology
The Pops Goes Country (1966)	Music from Nashville, My Home Town (1966)	It's a Guitar World (1967)

Music from Nashville, My Home Town is the thirtieth studio album by Chet Atkins. It was re-released on CD in 2006 combined with Chet. Both were originally released on the budget label, RCA Camden.

"Prancin' Filly" was written by Atkins' father, James A. Atkins.

== Reception ==
Professional ratings
Review scores
Source	Rating
Allmusic	3.5/5 stars

Writing for Allmusic, critic Steve Leggett wrote of the reissue "Atkins was a master musician working in a genre all too often prone to caricature and posturing, and he did it all without wearing a big hat. If Atkins wasn't exactly perceived as a guitar god by the public, perhaps because everything he did seemed so smooth and effortless, other players certainly knew what he could do."

== Track listing ==
=== Side one ===
1. "Prancin' Filly" (James A. Atkins) – 1:50
2. "Sidewalks of Nashville" (Lou Gottlieb) – 2:15
3. "Solo Soul" (Cindy Walker) – 2:14
4. "Summer Sunday" (Johnny Duncan) – 2:16
5. "Around the World" (from the film Around the World in 80 Days) (Victor Young, Harold Adamson) – 3:40

=== Side two ===
1. "Ain't We Got Fun" (Raymond S. Egan, Gus Kahn, Richard Whiting) – 2:17
2. "Yours" (Gonzalo Roig, Jack Sherr) – 2:30
3. "Love Offering" (Jerry Reed) – 2:01
4. "George's Theme" (Tommy Burk, George Gillis) – 2:07
5. "Lonesome Road" (Gene Austin, Nathaniel Shilkret) – 2:46

== Personnel ==
- Chet Atkins – guitar
