= Teensville =

Studio album by Chet Atkins
- Released: January 1960
- Recorded: Nashville, TN
- Genre: Rock; rockabilly; rhythm and blues; country; pop
- Length: 28:16
- Label: RCA Victor LSP-2161 (Stereo)
- Producer: Chet Atkins

Chet Atkins chronology
After the Riot at Newport (1960)	Teensville (1960)	The Other Chet Atkins (1960)

Teensville is the twelfth studio album recorded by American guitarist and producer Chet Atkins, released in 1960.

== Overview ==
The idea here was for Atkins to release a record appealing to teens who were now interested in rock 'n roll. The original version of "Oh Lonesome Me", a hit on both the pop and country charts for Don Gibson, was produced by Atkins and featured his guitar.

The original liner notes were by The Everly Brothers whom Atkins later produced.

It was his second charting album, coming after 2 years of minor commercial success. The album peaked at No. 16 on the Billboard's albums chart during a twelve week-stay. It reached the same position on Cash Box.

== Reception ==
Professional ratings
Review scores
Source	Rating
Allmusic	3/5 stars

In his review for Allmusic, critic Stephen Thomas Erlewine wrote Atkins "never captures the raw spark of rock & roll. What shines through is Atkins' understated elegance. All of the numbers are arranged as pop instrumentals and his guitar playing is so tasteful that it makes the half-hearted execution almost forgiveable."

== Reissues ==
- Teensville was re-released on CD in 1998 by BMG International.

== Track listing ==
=== Side one ===
1. "White Silver Sands" (Charles "Red" Matthews) – 2:19
2. "Boo Boo Stick Beat" (Buddy Harman, John D. Loudermilk) – 2:11
3. "Oh Lonesome Me" (Don Gibson) – 2:20
4. "One Mint Julep" (Rudy Toombs) – 2:09
5. "Take a Message to Mary" (Felice Bryant, Boudleaux Bryant) – 2:21
6. "Teensville" (Wayne Cogswell) – 2:16

=== Side two ===
1. "Night Train" (Jimmy Forrest, Lewis Simpkins) – 2:36
2. "Come Softly to Me" (Gretchen Christoper, Barbara Ellis, Gary Troxel) – 2:01
3. "Sleep Walk" (Santo & Johnny) – 2:33
4. "Django's Castle" (Django Reinhardt) – 2:32
5. "Till There Was You" (Meredith Willson) – 2:30
6. "Hot Toddy" (Ralph Flanagan) – 2:22

== Personnel ==
- Chet Atkins – guitar

== Production notes ==
- Bill Porter – engineer

== Charts ==
Chart (1960)	Peak position
US Billboard Top Albums	16
US Cashbox Top Albums (Monoraul)	16
US Cashbox Top Albums (Stereo)	32
