= Chet Picks on the Grammys =

Compilation album by Chet Atkins
- Released: February 12, 2002
- Genre: Country, jazz
- Label: Columbia

Chet Atkins chronology
Guitar Legend: The RCA Years (2000)	Chet Picks on the Grammys (2002)	Solo Sessions (2003)

Chet Picks on the Grammys is a compilation recording by American guitarist Chet Atkins. The 13 tracks are all recordings of songs that won Grammy awards from 1967 to 1996. The songs either won a Grammy individually or were included on an album that won.

Professional ratings
Review scores
Source	Rating
Allmusic	4/5 stars

== Track listing ==
1. "Tears" (Django Reinhardt, Stéphane Grappelli) – 2:46
2. "Nut Sundae" (Jerry Reed Hubbard) – 2:39
3. "Snowbird" (MacLellan) – 2:16
4. "I'll See You in My Dreams" (Isham Jones, Gus Kahn) – 3:20
5. "The Entertainer" (Scott Joplin) – 2:18
6. "Caravan" (Duke Ellington, Irving Mills, Juan Tizol) – 3:18
7. "Ready for the Times to Get Better" (Reynolds) – 4:09
8. "Cosmic Square Dance" (Atkins, Mark Knopfler, Paul Yandell) – 4:17
9. "So Soft, Your Goodbye" (Randy Goodrum) – 3:20
10. "Poor Boy Blues" (Paul Kennerly) – 4:05
11. "Sneakin' Around" (Kass) – 4:27
12. "Young Thing" (Atkins) – 3:15
13. "Jam Man" (Atkins) – 3:22

== Personnel ==
- Chet Atkins – guitar
- Paulinho da Costa - Percussion
