= American Salute =

Studio album by Chet Atkins and Arthur Fiedler
- Released: 1972
- Genres: Country, pop
- Label: RCA Red Seal

Chet Atkins chronology
Me & Chet (1972)	American Salute (1972)	World's Greatest Melodies (1972)

American Salute is a recording by Chet Atkins with Arthur Fiedler and the Boston Pops Orchestra released in 1972.

== Track listing ==
Side 1:

1. "American Salute" (Morton Gould)
2. "Shenandoah" (Traditional)
3. "Rodeo: Hoedown" (Aaron Copland)
4. *By the Time I Get to Phoenix" (Jimmy Webb)
5. "Chester" (from New England Triptych)
6. "Tennessee Waltz" (Redd Stewart, Pee Wee King)
7. "American Patrol" (F.W. Meacham)

Side 2:

1. "Deep in the Heart of Texas" (June Hershey, Don Swander)
2. "Galveston" (Jimmy Webb)
3. "Down in the Valley" (Traditional)
4. "St. Louis Blues March"
5. "Dixie" (Traditional)
6. "Alabama Jubilee"
7. "Pops Roundup"

== Personnel ==
- Chet Atkins – guitar
