= The Essential Chet Atkins =

Greatest hits album by Chet Atkins
- Released: 2007
- Recorded: 1946–1995
- Genre: Country, jazz
- Label: Legacy
- Producer: Chet Atkins, Lenny Breau, Daryl Dybka, Bob Ferguson, Charles Grean, Bob Irwin, Anita Kerr, Stephen H. Sholes, Mark Knopfler

Chet Atkins chronology
The Essential Chet Atkins: The Columbia Years (2004)	The Essential Chet Atkins (2007)	Eclectic Guitar (2007)

The Essential Chet Atkins is a two-disc compilation recording by American guitarist Chet Atkins, released in 2007 on the Legacy label.

== History ==
The 40 tracks span Atkins' career from "Chet Atkins and the All-Star Hillbillies" ("Guitar Blues") released on Bullet Records to his last solo album Almost Alone ("Big Foot"). The selections include not only Chet's solo recordings and his duets with other guitar players, but also include songs he contributed to as a sideman. Songs with Maybelle Carter and The Carter Sisters, Eddy Arnold, The Everly Brothers, Don Gibson are represented in this collection. Duets include Jerry Reed, Merle Travis, Lenny Breau, Les Paul and Mark Knopfler. This marked the first licensed US release of "Guitar Blues."

== Reception ==
Professional ratings
Review scores
Source	Rating
Allmusic	4.5/5 stars

Allmusic stated: "It might not be the ultimate Atkins compilation, given the sheer quantity of material the guitarist recorded. But it's a good — and, more crucially, very listenable — starting point for surveying his work as a solo artist."

== Track listing ==
1. "Guitar Blues (Pickin' the Blues)" (Atkins) – 2:50
2. "Bug Dance" (Atkins) – 2:56
3. "Dizzy Strings" (Atkins) – 2:43
4. "Centipede Boogie" (Atkins) – 2:41
5. "Mainstreet Breakdown" (Atkins) – 2:17
6. "Root, Hog or Die" (Carter, Foree) – 2:33
7. "Jitterbug Waltz" (Fats Waller) – 2:37
8. "Third Man Theme" (Anton Karas) – 2:25
9. "Black Mountain Rag" (Magness) – 2:16
10. "Country Gentleman" (Atkins, Boudleaux Bryant) – 2:15
11. "City Slicker" (Atkins) – 2:21
12. "Mister Sandman" (Pat Ballard) – 2:17
13. "The Poor People of Paris (Jean's Song)" (Rene Rouzaud, Marguerite Monnot) – 1:59
14. "Big D" (Frank Loesser) – 2:17
15. "Trambone" (Atkins) – 2:13
16. "Should We Tell Him" (Phil Everly, Don Everly) – 2:08
17. "Hidden Charm" (Rich) – 2:31
18. "Oh Lonesome Me" (Don Gibson) – 2:34
19. "I'm Forever Blowing Bubbles" (Brockman, Kellette, Kennedy) – 1:36
20. "Slinkey" (Atkins) – 2:01
21. "Boo Boo Stick Beat" (Buddy Harman, John D. Loudermilk) – 2:10
22. "Hot Mocking Bird" – 2:12
23. "The Slop" (Cogswell) – 2:18
24. "Man of Mystery" (Carr) – 2:05
25. "Wheels" (Petty) – 2:31
26. "Teen Scene" (Chet Atkins, Jerry Reed) – 2:00
27. "Freight Train" (James, Williams) – 2:05
28. "Satan's Doll" (Smith) – 3:51
29. "Yakety Axe" (Boots Randolph, Rich) – 2:06
30. "A Taste of Honey" (Marlow, Scott) – 2:41
31. "Drive In" (Jerry Reed) – 2:20
32. "Get on with It" (Chet Atkins, Jerry Reed) – 2:11
33. "Cannonball Rag" (Merle Travis) – 2:14
34. "Take Five" (Paul Desmond) – 2:44
35. "Is Anything Better Than This" (Shel Silverstein) – 2:30
36. "It's Been a Long, Long Time" (Sammy Cahn, Jule Styne) – 3:32
37. "Polka Dots and Moonbeams" (Jimmy Van Heusen, Johnny Burke) – 5:51
38. "Poor Boy Blues" (Paul Kennerley) – 4:04
39. "Sneakin' Around" (Kass) – 4:28
40. "Big Foot" (Atkins) – 1:40

== Personnel ==
- Chet Atkins – guitar
