= Solo Flights =

Studio album by Chet Atkins
- Released: 1968
- Recorded: RCA's "Nashville Sound" Studio, Nashville, TN
- Genres: Country, pop
- Label: RCA Victor

Chet Atkins chronology
Solid Gold 68 (1968)	Solo Flights (1968)	Lover's Guitar (1969)

Solo Flights is the thirty-sixth studio album by Chet Atkins. Side one of this album features Atkins' experiment with the "Octabass Guitar," where he replaced the two low strings (the E and A strings) with heavier strings in order to drop an octave and create a fuller sound with bass.

The album debuted on the US Billboard Top LPs on the 3rd of February, peaking at No. 184 during a three-week stay on the chart.

This album was reissued on CD for the first time, in Japan only, on April 22, 2009.

== Reception ==
Professional ratings
Review scores
Source	Rating
Allmusic	4/5 stars

Writing for Allmusic, critic Richard S. Ginell wrote of the album "All told, this is one of Atkins' more pleasing collections from that era."

== Track listing ==
=== Side one ===
1. "Drive In" (Rich) 2:15
2. "Three Little Words" (Burt Kalmar, Harry Ruby) 2:35
3. "Autumn Leaves" (Joseph Kosma, Jacques Prévert, Johnny Mercer) 3:25
4. "Chet's Tune" (Cohen) 2:18
5. "Mercy, Mercy, Mercy" (Joe Zawinul) 2:12
6. "Cheek to Cheek" (Irving Berlin) 3:10

=== Side two ===
1. "Cindy Oh Cindy" (Robert Barron, Burt Long) 2:25
2. "When You Wish Upon a Star" (Ned Washington, Leigh Harline) 2:46
3. "Music to Watch Girls By" (Sid Ramin, Tony Velona) 2:30
4. "Choro da Saudade" (Agustín Barrios) 2:37
5. "Gonna Get Along Without You Now" (Milton Kellem) 2:05
6. "Georgy Girl" (Jim Dale, Tom Springfield) 2:45

== Personnel ==
- Chet Atkins – guitar

== Charts ==
Chart (1968)	Peak position
US Billboard Top LPs	184
