= Guitar Legend: The RCA Years =

Compilation album by Chet Atkins
- Released: April 4, 2000
- Recorded: 1947–1977
- Genres: Country, pop
- Length: 123:48
- Labels: Buddah (99673), RCA
- Producers: Chet Atkins, Steve Sholes, Bob Ferguson, Charles Grean

Chet Atkins chronology
The Day Finger Pickers Took Over the World (1997)	Guitar Legend: The RCA Years (2000)	Chet Picks on the Grammys (2002)

Guitar Legend: The RCA Years is a two-disc compilation recording by American guitarist Chet Atkins. The 50 tracks included here focus on his first recordings in 1947 to the 1977 release Nashville Guitar Quartet.

== History ==
This collection includes many of Chet's early 78 rpm & 45 rpm releases. Issued on CD for the first time are tracks from Atkins' early EP Pickin' the Hits "Dance With Me Henry" and "Tweedlee Dee" as well as early versions of "Trambone" and "Blue Ocean Echo" ("Blue Echo"). The short-lived ensemble "The Rhythm Rockers (featuring Chet Atkins)" is represented by "Dig These Blues".

The version of "Black Mountain Rag" is incorrectly listed in the liner notes as taken from the 10-inch vinyl release Gallopin' Guitar. It is actually a much later version from the LP Pickin' My Way. The original was to be used but the later version was mistakenly included.

There is more of a concentration on the early period, with a much smaller amount from selected '50's and '60's LP's. This was done in part because many of the early Atkins songs appreciated by collectors were out of print and unavailable. Atkins had been reluctant to see this material reissued during his lifetime because he felt that his early playing was too brash and rough.

Country guitar historian and Atkins authority Rich Kienzle wrote the liner notes for this compilation and played a role in choosing the tracks.

== Reception ==
Professional ratings
Review scores
Source	Rating
Allmusic	4.5/5 stars
Country Standard Time	(no rating)

Allmusic critic Jim Smith praised the compilation, writing it was "arguably the first affordable collection to paint a comprehensive picture... Each phase of his development is documented, with an emphasis on his classic early group recordings". Henry Koretzky wrote that the album displays "a stylistic versatility that his more mainstream albums never showcased."

== Track listing ==
1. "Canned Heat" (Atkins) – 2:35
2. "The Nashville Jump" (Atkins, Tennis) – 2:31
3. "Dizzy Strings" (Atkins) – 2:42
4. "Tellin' My Troubles to My Old Guitar" (Weston) – 2:45
5. "Dance of the Golden Rod" (Merle Travis) – 2:39
6. "Galloping on the Guitar" (Atkins) – 2:28
7. "Centipede Boogie" (Atkins) – 2:40
8. "Main Street Breakdown" (Atkins) – 2:16
9. "Indian Love Call" (Rudolf Friml, Oscar Hammerstein, Otto Harbach) – 2:38
10. "Mountain Melody" (Atkins) – 2:09
11. "Jitterbug Waltz" (Maltby, Waller) – 2:36
12. "Rainbow" (Bryan, Wenrich) – 2:36
13. "Nobody's Sweetheart" (Ernie Erdman, Gus Kahn, Billy Meyers, E. Schoebel) – 2:14
14. "Chinatown, My Chinatown" (William Jerome, Jean Schwartz) – 1:59
15. "Fiddle Patch" (Dale Potter) – 2:19
16. "(When It's) Darkness on the Delta" (Levinson, Neiburg, Symes) – 2:46
17. "High Rockin' Swing" (Avants, Tennant) – 2:19
18. "Guitars on Parade" (Atkins) – 2:21
19. "Oh By Jingo!" (Lew Brown, Albert Von Tilzer) – 2:13
20. "The Bells of St. Mary's" (Adams, Furber) – 2:13
21. "Country Gentleman" (Atkins, Boudleaux Bryant) – 2:14
22. "Memphis Blues" (W. C. Handy, George Norton) – 2:08
23. "Downhill Drag" (Atkins, Bryant) – 2:22
24. "Ballin' the Jack" (Burris, Smith) – 2:56
25. "Silver Bell" (Madden, Wenrich) – 2:14
26. "Mr. Sandman" (Pat Ballard) – 2:18
27. "New Spanish Two-Step" (Duncan, Bob Wills) – 2:11
28. "The Poor People of Paris (Jean's Song)" (Monnot) – 1:59
29. "Tweedlee Dee" (Scott) – 2:24
30. "Wallflower (Dance With Me Henry)" (Ballard, Otis) – 2:22
31. "Blue Ocean Echo" (Atkins, Bryant) – 2:19
32. "Trambone" (Atkins) – 2:12
33. "Dig These Blues" (Chatman) – 2:24
34. "Yesterdays" (Harbach, Kern) – 2:20
35. "Walk, Don't Run" (Johnny Smith) – 2:24
36. "Hot Toddy" (Flanagan) – 2:24
37. "Slinkey" (Atkins) – 2:04
38. "Frankie and Johnny" (Traditional) – 3:37
39. "Windy and Warm" (John D. Loudermilk) – 2:28
40. "Early Times" (Jerry Reed) – 2:40
41. "Satan's Doll" (Smith) – 3:51
42. "So Rare" (Jerry Herst, Jack Sharpe) – 3:03
43. "Yakety Axe" (Boots Randolph, Rich) – 2:04
44. "Blue Angel" (Lima) – 2:25
45. "Steeplechase Lane" (Jerry Reed Hubbard) – 2:26
46. "Black Mountain Rag" (Traditional) – 2:35
47. "Take Five" (Paul Desmond) – 2:42
48. "Blue Finger" (Hubbard) – 2:38
49. "Cascade" (Slone) – 2:26
50. "Carolina Shout" (Johnson) – 2:39

== Personnel ==
- Chet Atkins – guitar
- Hank Snow – guitar
- Dale Potter – fiddle
- Henry "Homer" Haynes – guitar
- Ken "Jethro" Burns – mandolin
- Liona Boyd – guitar
- John Knowles – guitar
- John Pell – guitar
