= Picks the Best =

Chet Atkins Picks the Best

Studio album by Chet Atkins
- Released: 1967
- Recorded: RCA "Nashville Sound" Studios, Nashville, TN
- Genre: Country, pop
- Label: RCA Victor LSP-3818 (Stereo)
- Producer: Bob Ferguson, Chet Atkins

Chet Atkins chronology
| Chet (1967) | Chet Atkins Picks the Best (1967) | Class Guitar (1967) |

Chet Atkins Picks the Best is the thirty-second studio album by guitarist Chet Atkins. At the Grammy Awards of 1968, Chet Atkins Picks the Best won the Grammy Award for Best Pop Instrumental Performance.

== Track listing ==
=== Side one ===
1. "You'll Never Walk Alone" (Rodgers, Hammerstein)
2. "Lovely Weather" (Lima)
3. "Insensatez (How Insensitive)" (Antonio Carlos Jobim)
4. "Colonel Bogey" (Kenneth J. Alford)
5. "Nuages" (Django Reinhardt)
6. "Anna (El Negro Zumbón)" (R. Valtro, F. Giordano)

=== Side two ===
1. "Battle Hymn of the Republic" (Julia Ward Howe)
2. "All (Theme from the Motion Picture Run for Your Wife)"
3. "El Paso" (Marty Robbins)
4. "Tears" (Django Reinhardt, Stéphane Grappelli)
5. "I Wish I Knew" (Wayne Moss)
6. "Ay, Ay, Ay"

== Personnel ==
- Chet Atkins – guitar
