= Chet, Floyd & Danny =

Studio album by Chet Atkins, Floyd Cramer and Danny Davis
- Released: 1977
- Genre: Country
- Label: RCA Victor
- Producers: Bob Ferguson, Chet Atkins, Danny Davis

Chet Atkins chronology
Me and My Guitar (1977)	Chet, Floyd & Danny (1977)	Guitar Monsters (1978)

Chet Atkins Collaborations chronology
Chester & Lester (1976)	Chet Floyd & Danny (1977)	Guitar Monsters (1978)

Chet, Floyd & Danny is a recording by Chet Atkins, Floyd Cramer and Danny Davis. Davis was the creator of the Nashville Brass, which recorded country songs with brass instruments.

== Chart performance ==
The album debuted on Billboard magazine's Top Country LP's chart in the issue dated June 25, 1977, peaking at No. 46 during a three-week run on the chart.

== Nomination ==
Chet, Floyd & Danny was nominated for the Best Country & Western Instrumental Performance Grammy in 1978. It did not win. Chet was up against himself in the same category since Me and My Guitar was also nominated.

== Track listing ==
Side 1:

1. "La Chicana" (Chet, Floyd & Danny)
2. "Java" (Floyd)
3. "I Saw the Light" (Hank Williams) (Danny)
4. "Black Mountain Rag" (Traditional) (Chet)
5. "Under the Double Eagle" (Wagner) (Danny)

Side 2:

1. "Four in the Morning" (Chet, Floyd & Danny)
2. "Kentucky" (Chet)
3. "Wabash Cannonball" (Danny)
4. "Main Theme from The Young and the Restless: Nadia's Theme" (Floyd)
5. "When You Wish Upon a Star" (Ned Washington, Leigh Harline) (Chet)
6. "Last Date" (Floyd)

== Personnel ==
- Chet Atkins – guitar
- Floyd Cramer – piano
- The Nashville Brass – horns
