= The Most Popular Guitar =

Studio album by Chet Atkins
- Released: May 1961
- Recorded: Nashville, TN
- Genre: Country, pop, jazz
- Length: 34:05
- Label: RCA Victor LSP-2346 (Stereo)

Chet Atkins chronology
Chet Atkins' Workshop (1960)	The Most Popular Guitar (1961)	Christmas with Chet Atkins (1961)

Professional ratings
Review scores
Source	Rating
Allmusic	3.5/5 stars

The Most Popular Guitar is the fifteenth studio album by guitarist Chet Atkins, released in 1961. It is an example of his highly orchestrated, smooth sound with lush strings and vocal choruses. While it did not top the chart action of his previous release Chet Atkins' Workshop, it spent ten weeks on the Billboard LP chart.

== Reissues ==
- In 1995, The Most Popular Guitar was re-released on CD by One Way Records along with Down Home.

== Track listing ==
=== Side one ===
1. "It Ain't Necessarily So" (George Gershwin, Ira Gershwin) – 2:43
2. "My Dear Little Sweetheart" (Johnny Smith, George David Weiss) – 2:48
3. "Stay as Sweet as You Are" (Mack Gordon, Harry Revel) – 3:38
4. "Monte Carlo Melody" (Maurice Shapiro) – 2:30
5. "When Day Is Done" (Buddy DeSylva, Robert Katscher) – 2:20
6. "My Prayer" (Georges Boulanger, Jimmy Kennedy) – 2:22

=== Side two ===
1. "Rock-A-Bye-Bye" (Mann Curtis, Guy Wood) – 2:40
2. "Vanessa" (Bernie Wayne) – 3:57
3. "Intermezzo" (Robert Henning, Heinz Provost) – 3:04
4. "Hi-Lili, Hi-Lo" (Bronislau Kaper, Helen Deutsch) – 2:40
5. "East of the Sun (and West of the Moon)" (Brooks Bowman) – 2:28
6. "Goin' Home" (Atkins) – 2:53

== Personnel ==
- Chet Atkins – guitar

== Charts ==
Chart (1961)	Peak position
US Billboard Top Albums	119
