= The Early Years 1946–1957 =

The Early Years 1946-1957

Compilation album by Chet Atkins
- Released: 2007
- Recorded: 1946–1957
- Genre: Country, pop
- Label: JSP

Chet Atkins chronology
Eclectic Guitar (2007)	The Early Years 1946-1957 (2007)

The Early Years 1946–1957 is a five-disc compilation recording by American guitarist Chet Atkins, released in 2007.

== History ==
The 158 tracks on this five-disc compilation cover Atkins' career from his very first single ("Guitar Blues") released on Bullet Records to 1957 and Finger Style Guitar. The selections include quite a few of Atkins' vocal performances, from the very earliest 78's he recorded. The releases are placed in chronological order, so following Atkins' career steps is both educational and enlightening — especially to those seeking to hear his development as a guitarist.

Discs four and five represent Atkins as one of Nashville's leading studio musicians as well as his own solo albums. The liner notes are extensive and include an essay by Drew Kent.

== Reception ==
Professional ratings
Review scores
Source	Rating
Allmusic	4/5 stars

Allmusic stated in their review: "The result is an entertaining and compelling look at the formative years of a crucial figure in the growth of country music, and guitar fans will get a fine buzz from the first-class picking that graces nearly every cut."

== Personnel ==
- Chet Atkins – guitar, vocals
- Rosalie Allen – vocals
- James Atkins – guitar
- Billie Rose Atkins – vocals
- George Barnes – guitar
- Beasley Singers – vocals
- Joe Biviano – accordion
- Harold Bradley – guitar
- Jethro Burns – mandolin, vocals
- Jerry Byrd – lap steel guitar
- Fran Carroll – bass
- Anita Carter – bass
- Helen Carter – vocals
- Al Chernet – guitar
- Donna Colleen – vocals
- Farris Coursey – drums
- Johnny Degeorge – drums
- Danny Dill – vocals
- Ray Edenton – guitar
- Austin Footrell – vocals
- Malcolm Gold – organ, piano
- "Papa" John Gordie – celeste, piano
- Buddy Harman – drums
- Henry "Homer" Haynes – guitar, vocals
- Marvin Hughes – organ, piano, celeste
- Charles Hurta – fiddle
- Louis Innis – guitar, vocals
- Bud Isaacs – pedal steel guitar
- Aaron Kerr – organ
- Anita Kerr – vocals, choral arrangements
- Red Kirk – vocals
- Millie Kirkham – vocals
- Angus P Klein – accordion
- Phil Kraus – drums
- Buck Lambert – fiddle
- Randy Lanham – guitar
- Grady Martin – guitar
- Elbert R. "Dutch" McMillan – clarinet
- Ernie Newton – bass
- Dale Potter – fiddle
- Jack Shook – guitar
- Harold Siegel – bass
- Hank Snow – guitar, vocals
- Brock Speer – vocals
- "Holly" Swanson – bass
