= The Essential Chet Atkins: The Columbia Years =

Greatest hits album by Chet Atkins
- Released: August 4, 2004
- Recorded: 1983–1997
- Genre: Country, jazz
- Length: 55:06
- Label: Columbia (92796)

Chet Atkins chronology
| Solo Sessions (2003) | The Essential Chet Atkins: The Columbia Years (2004) | The Essential Chet Atkins (2007) |

The Essential Chet Atkins: The Columbia Years is a compilation recording by American guitarist Chet Atkins. The 15 tracks included here are from his recordings on the Columbia label from 1983 to the 1997. The tracks have all been digitally remastered.

There is more focus on Atkins' jazz-pop work here, but his country roots are still evident. His later collaborations with Mark Knopfler, Jerry Reed, Suzy Bogguss and Tommy Emmanuel are represented here.

Professional ratings
Review scores
| Source | Rating |
|---|---|
| Allmusic | 3.5/5 stars |

== Track listing ==
1. "Bourree" (Bach) – 3:52
2. "Cosmic Square Dance" (Chet Atkins, Mark Knopfler, Paul Yandell) – 4:17
3. "Wobegon (The Way It Used to Be)" (Atkins) – 3:17
4. "Maybelle" (Atkins) – 3:10
5. "Dixie McGuire" (Tommy Emmanuel) – 3:53
6. "Jam Man" (Atkins) – 3:20
7. "Poor Boy Blues" (Paul Kennerley) – 4:03
8. "Road to Gundaghi/Waltzing Matilda" (Traditional) – 3:03
9. "Sneakin' Around" (Kass) – 4:26
10. "Dream" (Mercer) – 4:37
11. "After You've Gone" (Creamer, Layton) – 3:32
12. "I'll See You in My Dreams" (Isham Jones, Gus Kahn) – 2:59
13. "Young Thing" (Atkins) – 3:13
14. "Imagine" (John Lennon) – 4:08
15. "So Soft, Your Goodbye" (Randy Goodrum) – 3:16

== Personnel ==
- Chet Atkins – guitar
- Mark Knopfler - guitar
- Jerry Reed - guitar
- Suzy Bogguss - vocals
- Paulinho Da Costa – percussion
- Tommy Emmanuel - guitar
