= Pickin' My Way =

Studio album by Chet Atkins
- Released: 1970
- Recorded: RCA's "Nashville Sound" Studio, Nashville, Tennessee
- Genre: Country, pop
- Length: 27:49
- Label: RCA Victor
- Producer: Chet Atkins, Jerry Reed

Chet Atkins chronology
Yestergroovin (1970)	Pickin' My Way (1970)	Strung Up (1971)

Pickin' My Way is the forty-first studio album by guitarist Chet Atkins. It reached number 13 on the Billboard Country charts. The liner notes are by Johnny Cash.

== Reissues ==
- In 1989, RCA/Mobile Fidelity Sound Labs re-released Pickin' My Way, Chet Atkins in Hollywood and Alone in a double CD set.

== Track listing ==
=== Side one ===
1. "Lover, Come Back to Me" (Sigmund Romberg, Oscar Hammerstein II) – 3:23
2. "The Boxer" (Paul Simon) – 3:46
3. "Hellacious" – 2:44
4. "I Never Knew" – 2:13
5. "Wabash Blues" – 3:02

=== Side two ===
1. "Black Mountain Rag" – 2:40
2. "Junk" (Paul McCartney) – 2:13
3. "When You Wish upon a Star" (Ned Washington, Leigh Harline) – 3:09
4. "Floatin' Down to Cotton Town" (Harold G. Frost, Henri F. Kickman) – 2:22
5. "Pickin' My Way" (Shirley Eikhard)– 2:18

== Personnel ==
- Chet Atkins – guitar

Production notes

- Produced by Chet Atkins and Jerry Reed
- Bill Vandervort – engineer
- Tom Pick – engineer
- Mike Shockley – recording technician
- Ray Butts – recording technician
- Dick Cobb – cover photo
