= Chet Atkins' Workshop =

Studio album by Chet Atkins
- Released: December 1960
- Recorded: Nashville, TN
- Genre: Jazz, pop
- Length: 27:01
- Label: RCA Victor LSP-2232 (Stereo)
- Producer: Chet Atkins

Chet Atkins chronology
The Other Chet Atkins (1960)	Chet Atkins' Workshop (1960)	The Most Popular Guitar (1961)

Chet Atkins' Workshop is the fourteenth studio album recorded by American guitarist Chet Atkins. Full of pop and jazz stylings and no country, this became his best-selling LP to date, peaking at No. 7 on the Billboard Pop album charts.

== History ==
Atkins is once again pictured on the cover in his home studio in Nashville. The liner notes are by David Halberstam, then writing for The Tennessean in Nashville, Tennessee, which discuss his practice of recording rhythm tracks in the RCA studio and then going home with the tapes to perfect his guitar part in his own studio. "The workshop resembles a small scale Cape Canaveral. In it is approximately $8,000 worth of electronic and electrical equipment, much of it built by Atkins himself: a small maze of mixing panels, a three channel stereo tape recorder, a one channel recorder... This is the lonely man's room and Atkins when he is working is a lonely man. 'Can't take my time in the studio. We're making money there and when you are making money you can't really take your time.' Here he can retire for days on end to be handed an occasional sandwich through the door by his wife Leona, but here to stay with his guitar, and his sound."

== Reception ==
Professional ratings
Review scores
Source	Rating
Allmusic	4/5 stars

Allmusic critic Greg Adams wrote in his review that Atkins' "relaxed fingerpicking works the material into a smooth consistency that sometimes belies the complexity of his technique, but the album is an engaging listen and an effortless-sounding intersection of diverse styles."

== Reissues ==
- In 2002, Classic Compact Disc (Disc 2103) released Chet Atkins' Workshop along with Mister Guitar on one compact disc.

== Track listing ==
=== Side one ===
1. "Lambeth Walk" (Douglas Furber, Noel Gay) – 2:45
2. "Theme from 'A Summer Place'" (Max Steiner) – 2:04
3. "Whispering" (Richard Coburn, Vincent Rose, John Schoenberger) – 2:04
4. "In a Little Spanish Town ('Twas On a Night Like This)" (Sam M. Lewis, Mabel Wayne, Joseph Young) – 2:11
5. "Sleep" (Earl Burtnett, Adam Geibel) – 2:15
6. "Marie" (Irving Berlin) – 2:12

=== Side two ===
1. "Hot Mocking Bird" (Bud Isaacs) – 2:07
2. "Lullaby of Birdland" (George Shearing, George David Weiss) – 2:04
3. "Tammy" (Jay Livingston, Ray Evans) – 1:55
4. "Goofus" (William Harold, Gus Kahn, Wayne King) – 2:31
5. "Bonita" (James Rich) – 2:46
6. "Que Sera, Sera (Whatever Will Be, Will Be)" (Jay Livingston, Ray Evans) – 2:07

== Personnel ==
- Chet Atkins – guitar

== Production Notes ==
- Produced by Chet Atkins
- Engineered by Bill Porter

== Charts ==
Chart (1961)	Peak position
US Billboard Top LPs	7
