= The Other Chet Atkins =

Studio album by Chet Atkins
- Released: September 1960
- Recorded: Nashville, TN
- Genre: Country, pop, classical
- Length: 28:09
- Label: RCA Victor LSP-2175 (Stereo)
- Producer: Chet Atkins

Chet Atkins chronology
Teensville (1960)	The Other Chet Atkins (1960)	Chet Atkins' Workshop (1961)

The Other Chet Atkins is the thirteenth studio album by American guitarist Chet Atkins. It is an unusual and notable album for him in that the entire album features Chet playing an acoustic nylon-string (Spanish) guitar and there is no country music.

Professional ratings
Review scores
Source	Rating
Allmusic	3/5 stars

== Track listing ==
=== Side one ===
1. "Begin the Beguine" (Cole Porter) – 3:21
2. "Sabrosa" (René Touzet) – 2:07
3. "Yours" (Gonzalo Roig, Jack Sherr) – 2:32
4. "Siboney" (Ernesto Lecuona) – 2:06
5. "The Streets of Laredo" (Traditional) – 2:41
6. "Delicado" (Waldir Azevedo) – 2:21

=== Side two ===
1. "Peanut Vendor" (Moisés Simmons) – 2:20
2. "El Relicario" (Jose Padilla) – 2:04
3. "Maria Elena" (Lorenzo Barcelata, Bob Russell) – 2:55
4. "Marcheta" (Victor Schertzinger) – 2:22
5. "Tzena Tzena Tzena" (Jules Grossman, J. Myron, Mitchell Parish) – 2:04
6. "Poinciana" (Nat Simon, Buddy Bernier) – 2:01

== Personnel ==
- Chet Atkins – guitar
