= Class Guitar =

Studio album by Chet Atkins
- Released: 1967
- Recorded: RCA "Nashville Sound" Studio, Nashville, TN
- Genre: Country, pop, classical
- Label: RCA Victor
- Producer: Chet Atkins, Bob Ferguson

Chet Atkins chronology
Picks the Best (1967)	Class Guitar (1967)	Hometown Guitar (1968)

Class Guitar is the thirty-third studio album by guitarist Chet Atkins. It peaked at number 26 on the US Country Album charts and number 189 on the Pop Album charts. It is out of print.

== Track listing ==
=== Side one ===
1. "Yellow Bird" (Keith, Bergman, Luboff)
2. "Malaguena" (Ernesto Lecuona)
3. "Morenita Do Brazil" (Farrauto) – 3:02
4. "Testament of Amelia"
5. "Acutely Cute" (Atkins) – 2:06
6. "Little Music Box" (Francisco Tárrega)
7. "Lagrima" (Tárrega)

=== Side two ===
1. "El Huma Hua Queno"
2. "Ave Maria" (Franz Schubert) – 2:42
3. "Scherzino Mexicano" (Manuel María Ponce)
4. "Manha de Carnaval (Theme from "Black Orpheus")" (Bonfa, Maria) – 1:41
5. "Chancion Triste" – 2:38
6. "To Be in Love" (Atkins, Jerry Reed)
7. "I Feel Pretty" (Leonard Bernstein, Stephen Sondheim) – 2:20

== Personnel ==
- Chet Atkins – guitar
- Jim Malley – engineer

== Charts ==
Chart (1968)	Peak position
US Billboard Top LPs	189
