= Chester and Lester =

Chester & Lester

Studio album by Chet Atkins and Les Paul
- Released: 1976
- Recorded: May 6–7, 1975
- Genre: Country, jazz
- Length: 36:21
- Label: RCA Victor
- Producer: Chet Atkins

Chet Atkins chronology
Chet Atkins Goes to the Movies (1976)	Chester & Lester (1976)	The Best of Chet Atkins & Friends (1976)

Chet Atkins Collaborations chronology
The Atkins - Travis Traveling Show (1974)	Chester & Lester (1976)	Chet Floyd & Danny (1977)

Professional ratings
Review scores
Source	Rating
Allmusic	4/5 stars
The Music Box	4/5 stars

Chester & Lester is a collaborative album by guitarists Chet Atkins and Les Paul released by RCA Records in 1976.

The album was recorded in May 1975 when Atkins was age 50 and Paul was 59. Atkins coaxed Paul out of his decade-long retirement for this recording. The liner notes state there is little overdubbing and the majority of the album was live in the studio.

Chester & Lester peaked at No. 11 on Billboard's Country album chart and No. 172 on the Pop album chart. It peaked at No. 27 on the Country chart again in 1978. At the Grammy Awards of 1976, Chester & Lester won the Grammy Award for Best Country Instrumental Performance.

== Reissues ==
- Both Chester & Lester and Guitar Monsters were released on CD in 1989 by Pair Records as Masters of the Guitar: Together with some tracks omitted.
- In 1998, Chester and Lester and the duo's follow-up release Guitar Monsters were reissued intact on one CD on One Way Records.
- Chester & Lester was reissued in 2007 on RCA Nashville/Legacy with four bonus tracks.

== Track listing ==
=== Side one ===
1. "It's Been a Long Time" (Sammy Cahn, Jule Styne) – 3:33
2. "Medley: Moonglow/Picnic (theme from Picnic)" – 4:44
3. "Caravan" (Duke Ellington, Irving Mills, Juan Tizol) – 3:21
4. "It Had to Be You" (Isham Jones, Gus Kahn) – 3:34
5. "Out of Nowhere" (Johnny Green, Edward Heyman) – 3:14

=== Side two ===
1. "Avalon" (Buddy DeSylva, Al Jolson, Vincent Rose) – 6:32
2. "Birth of the Blues" (Lew Brown, Buddy G. DeSylva, Ray Henderson) – 3:07
3. "Someday Sweetheart" (Spikes, Spikes) – 3:21
4. "'Deed I Do" (Walter Hirsch, Fred Rose) – 2:31
5. "Lover Come Back to Me" (Oscar Hammerstein, Sigmund Romberg) – 2:44

Bonus tracks on Columbia Nashville CD re-release:

1. "The World Is Waiting for the Sunrise" (previously unreleased)
2. "You Brought a New Kind of Love to Me" (previously unreleased)
3. "Caravan" (previously unreleased alternate take)
4. "Moonglow / Picnic (Theme From 'Picnic')" (previously unreleased rehearsal take)

== Personnel ==
- Chet Atkins – guitar
- Les Paul – guitar
- Ray Edenton – guitar
- Randy Goodrum – piano
- Larrie Londin – drums
- Henry Strzelecki – bass
- Bob Moore – bass
- Kenneth Aronson – album cover design
- Kenneth Aronson, Chip DeVilbiss – photography
