= Chet Atkins' Gallopin' Guitar =

Studio album by Chet Atkins
- Released: 1953
- Genre: Country, pop
- Label: RCA Victor LPM-3079
- Producer: Steve Sholes

Chet Atkins chronology
| Chet Atkins' Gallopin' Guitar (1953) | Stringin' Along with Chet Atkins (1953) |

Chet Atkins' Gallopin' Guitar is the first studio album released by American guitarist Chet Atkins on the RCA Victor label (see 1953 in music). It was available as a 10-inch vinyl record.

== History ==
Atkins had previously recorded on Bullet Records and also as a sideman with various acts. He was brought to RCA by Steve Sholes in 1947. After playing on a variety of radio shows, Radio manager Si Simon had been promoting Atkins by sending acetates of his live radio performances to various record companies. One landed in Sholes' hands. Atkins had relocated to Denver after being fired by KWTO in Missouri for "not sounding country enough." He was to be brought into RCA as a guitarist, singer and songwriter. Arrangements were made for Atkins to travel to Chicago to do a demo recording. He cut eight "sides" (songs) in Chicago with his idol George Barnes on rhythm guitar, Augie Klein on accordion, Charles Hurta on fiddle, and Harold Siegel on bass. Five of those eight songs recorded April 11, 1947 included Atkins singing. RCA released the songs on a 10" vinyl as Chet Atkins and his Colorado Mountain Boys.

Atkins later spent time trying to locate those early demos of himself singing in order to destroy them.

Atkins later traveled to New York to record as a sideman and, because of an impending musician's strike, to also stockpile solo recordings for release in case the strike was a protracted one. After these initial recordings, he was still unemployed. He returned to Knoxville and continued on radio there until he joined The Carter Sisters and Mother Maybelle Carter.

The song "Gallopin' on the Guitar" had been released as a single in 1947 and was a minor hit, often being used as a radio theme song by 1949.

Also in 1953, his single "Country Gentleman", co-written with Boudleaux Bryant, was a minor hit. It was recorded in a garage.

Atkins stayed with RCA for 36 years until he moved to Columbia Records in 1983.

== Track listing ==
1. "Gallopin' Guitar" (Chet Atkins)
2. "Stephen Foster Medley" (Stephen Foster (uncredited), arranged by Atkins)
3. "St. Louis Blues" (W. C. Handy)
4. "Hangover Blues" (Atkins, Boudleaux Bryant)
5. "Black Mountain Rag" (Tommy Magness)
6. "Lover, Come Back to Me" (Sigmund Romberg)
7. "The 3rd Man Theme" (Anton Karas)
8. "Imagination" (Atkins)

== Personnel ==
- Chet Atkins – guitar
- Henry "Homer" Haynes – guitar
- Ken "Jethro" Burns – mandolin
- Charlie Grean – bass
