= Chet (Chet Atkins album) =

Studio album by Chet Atkins
- Released: 1967
- Recorded: Nashville, TN
- Genres: Country, pop, jazz
- Label: RCA Camden CAS-2182
- Producers: Chet Atkins, Bob Ferguson

Chet Atkins chronology
It's a Guitar World (1967)	Chet (1967)	Picks the Best (1967)

Professional ratings
Review scores
Source	Rating
Allmusic	(no rating)

Chet is a studio album by American guitarist Chet Atkins, released in 1967.

== Reissues ==
- Chet was reissued on CD in 2006 combined with Music From Nashville, My Home Town.

== Track listing ==
=== Side one ===
1. "Foggy Mountain Top" (Carter)
2. "Truck Driver's Blues" (Ted Daffan)
3. "Bandera" (Atkins)
4. "Make the World Go Away" (Hank Cochran)
5. "Oh Baby Mine" (Pat Ballard)

=== Side two ===
1. "Oklahoma Hills" (Woody Guthrie)
2. "Just Out of Reach (Stewart)
3. "Wabash Cannonball" (Carter)
4. "Release Me" (Eddie Miller, W. S. Stevenson)
5. "Goin' Down the Road Feelin' Bad" (Traditional)

== Personnel ==
- Chet Atkins – guitar
