= The Night Atlanta Burned =

Studio album by Chet Atkins
- Released: 1975
- Recorded: RCA 'Nashville Sound' Studios, Nashville, TN
- Genre: Country, folk, bluegrass
- Length: 27:15
- Label: RCA Victor
- Producer: Bob Ferguson and Chet Atkins

Chet Atkins chronology
Chet Atkins Picks on Jerry Reed (1974)	The Night Atlanta Burned (1975)	Chet Atkins Goes to the Movies (1976)

The Night Atlanta Burned is the forty-sixth studio album by Chet Atkins, credited to "The Atkins String Co." — a quartet comprising Chet, Johnny Gimble, Paul Yandell and Lisa Silver. The album is a fusion of classical musical techniques with country, folk and bluegrass.

The liner notes are by John D. Loudermilk, discussing the burning of Atlanta and the Atlanta Conservatory of Music during the American Civil War.

== Reception ==
Professional ratings
Review scores
Source	Rating
Allmusic	4.5/5 stars

Writing for Allmusic, critic Richard S. Ginell wrote of the album "With all the hype about the Yo-Yo Ma/Mark O'Connor/Edgar Meyer Appalachia Waltz projects of the 1990s, it's enlightening to discover the seeds of that classical/country/bluegrass fusion right here, some 20 years ahead of the game."

== Reissues ==
- The Night Atlanta Burned was re-released on CD in 2007 packaged with The First Nashville Guitar Quartet on Raven Records.

== Track listing ==
=== Side one ===
1. "Sonora" (John D. Loudermilk) – 3:20
2. "Mostly Mozart" (Mozart) – 3:51
3. "Bill Cheatham" (Traditional) – 2:41
4. "San Antonio Stroll" (Noah) – 2:46
5. "To Ann" (Loudermilk) – 2:05

=== Side two ===
1. "The Night Atlanta Burned" (Loudermilk) – 2:16
2. "Carnavalito" (Zaldivar) – 3:12
3. "The Women of Ireland" (Traditional) – 2:28
4. "Scotland" (Monroe) – 2:33
5. "Odd Folks of Okracoke" (Loudermilk) – 2:03

== Personnel ==
- Chet Atkins - guitar
- Johnny Gimble - mandolin
- Paul Yandell - guitar
- Lisa Silver - violin, viola

Production notes

- Produced by Bob Ferguson and Chet Atkins
- Engineered by Chuck Seitz and Bill Vandervert
- Technicians: Al Patchucki, George Bennett, Bubba Campbell
