= First Nashville Guitar Quartet =

Studio album by Chet Atkins, Liona Boyd, John Knowles and John Pell
- Released: 1979
- Recorded: Nashville, TN
- Genre: Country, Classical
- Length: 42:35
- Label: RCA Victor
- Producer: Chet Atkins

Chet Atkins chronology
Guitar Monsters (1978)	First Nashville Guitar Quartet (1979)	Reflections (1980)

First Nashville Guitar Quartet is the title of a 1979 album by Chet Atkins, Liona Boyd, John Knowles and John Pell.

The quartet played in the style of a chamber orchestra for guitars. Arrangements were worked out amongst the four players. Recording was done in both RCA's Studio A and at Atkins' own home studio.

The single "Love Song of Pepe Sanchez", released by the Quartet in 1979, did not chart.

== Reception ==
Professional ratings
Review scores
Source	Rating
Allmusic	3/5 stars

Writing for Allmusic, critic Richard S. Ginell wrote of the album "Guitars may not be about to replace violins, violas, and cellos in the chamber music category, but this group proves that they can assume a respectable place in country-pop music, anyway."

== Reissues ==
- In 1997, The First Nashville Guitar Quartet was reissued on CD along with Me and My Guitar in by One Way Records.
- In 2007, it was also released on CD along with The Night Atlanta Burned by Raven Records.

== Track listing ==
=== Side one ===
1. "Carolina Shout" (Johnson, John Knowles, John Pell) – 2:37
2. "Londonderry Air" (Traditional) – 3:00
3. "Love Song of Pepe Sanchez" (John Pell) – 2:16
4. "Skirts of Mexico" (Ponce, John Knowles) – 3:00
5. "You Needed Me" (Goodrum) – 2:59
6. "Bound for Boston" (Traditional) – 3:40

=== Side two ===
1. "Washington Post March" (Traditional) – 2:18
2. "Someday My Prince Will Come" (Frank Churchill, Larry Morey) – 2:55
3. "Rings of Grass" (Shel Silverstein) – 3:17
4. "Rodrigo Concerto" (Joaquín Rodrigo) – 3:34
5. "Brandenburg" (Bach) – 2:59

== Personnel ==
- Chet Atkins – guitar
- Liona Boyd - guitar
- John Knowles - guitar
- John Pell - guitar
