= Down Home (Chet Atkins album) =

Studio album by Chet Atkins
- Released: February, 1962
- Venue: AJ Fletcher Theater
- Studios: Chet Atkins; Melba Montgomery; Seals and Crofts; Zoot Sims; Joey Baron; Z. Z. Hill
- Genres: Blues; Jazz; Hard bop
- Length: 28:55
- Label: RCA Victor LSP-2450 (Stereo)
- Producer: Chet Atkins

Chet Atkins chronology
Chet Atkins Plays Back Home Hymns (1962)	Down Home (1962)	Our Man in Nashville (1962)

Down Home is the nineteenth studio album by American guitarist Chet Atkins.

After releasing the smooth pop and easy listening albums Chet Atkins' Workshop and The Most Popular Guitar, Chet returned to his roots with Down Home. The album peaked at No. 31 and returned Atkins to the Top 40. It includes two of Chet's signature tunes, "Windy and Warm" and "Trambone".

== Reception ==
Professional ratings
Review scores
Source	Rating
Allmusic	3/5 stars

Writing for Allmusic, critic William Ruhlman wrote of the album "The contrast from his previous secular release couldn't have been more dramatic... Down Home outpolled The Most Popular Guitar by 88 places in the Billboard LP charts, returning him to the Top 40, which seemed to indicate that when you let Atkins do what he liked, his fans probably would like it too."

== Reissues ==
- Down Home was re-released on CD by One Way Records along with The Most Popular Guitar in 1995.

== Track listing ==
=== Side one ===
1. "Salty Dog Rag" (Edward Crowe, John Gordy) – 2:10
2. "I Am a Pilgrim" (Merle Travis) – 3:03
3. "Trambone" (Atkins) – 2:15
4. "Steel Guitar Rag" (Leon McAuliffe) – 1:54
5. "Little Feet" (Atkins) – 2:27
6. "Blue Steel Blues" (Ted Daffan) – 2:19

=== Side two ===
1. "Windy and Warm" (John D. Loudermilk) – 2:26
2. "I Ain't Gonna Work Tomorrow" (Atkins, Charlie Louvin) – 2:32
3. "Never on Sunday" (Manos Hadjidakis, Billy Towne) – 3:01
4. "Girl Friend of the Whirling Dervish" (Al Dubin, Johnny Mercer, Harry Warren) – 2:15
5. "Give the World a Smile" (Otis Deaton, Marshall Yandell) – 2:04
6. "Tuxedo Junction" (Buddy Feyne, Erskine Hawkins) – 2:07

== Personnel ==
- Chet Atkins – guitar
- Boots Randolph – saxophone
- Charlie McCoy – harmonica
- Bill Porter, Tommy Strong – engineer

== Charts ==
Chart (1962)	Peak position
US Billboard Top LPs	31
