= A Session with Chet Atkins =

Studio album by Chet Atkins
- Released: December 1954
- Genre: Country, pop
- Length: 33:09
- Label: RCA Victor LPM-1090 (Mono)

Chet Atkins chronology
Stringin' Along with Chet Atkins (1953)	A Session with Chet Atkins (1954)	Stringin' Along with Chet Atkins (1955)

Alternative Cover
- The 1961 re-issue LP cover.

A Session with Chet Atkins is the third studio album recorded by American guitarist Chet Atkins. It features Atkins introducing standard pop and jazz melded with country sensibilities. The liner notes state this is the first use of a celeste on a country record. The musicians include Homer and Jethro in the rhythm section. Atkins uses his new EchoSonic amplifier for the first time on his recordings.

== Reception ==
Professional ratings
Review scores
Source	Rating
Allmusic	4/5 stars

Allmusic music critic Richard S. Ginell praised the album and wrote "With a roomful of crack Nashville session men, Chet Atkins' first 12-inch album is one joyful, yet sophisticated and controlled compilation of mostly standard pop and jazz tunes all decked out country-style."

== Track listing ==
=== Side one ===
1. "South" (Ray Charles, Thamon Hayes, Bennie Moten) – 2:45
2. "(Back Home Again in) Indiana" (James F. Hanley, Ballard MacDonald) – 3:20
3. "Alabama Jubilee" (George Cobb, Jack Yellen) – 2:35
4. "Have You Ever Been Lonely (Have You Ever Been Blue)" (George Brown, Peter DeRose) – 2:40
5. "Red Wing" (Kerry Mills, Thurland Chattaway) – 2:22
6. "Ol' Man River" (Jerome Kern, Oscar Hammerstein II) – 2:32

=== Side two ===
1. "Caravan" (Duke Ellington, Irving Mills, Juan Tizol) – 3:25
2. "Corrine, Corrina" (Armenter Chatmon, Mitchell Parish, J. Mayo Williams) – 2:20
3. "The Birth of the Blues" (Lew Brown, Buddy G. DeSylva, Ray Henderson) – 3:20
4. "A Gay Ranchero" (Juan José Espinosa, Francia Luban, Abe Tuvim) – 2:35
5. "Frankie and Johnny" (Traditional) – 2:35
6. "Honeysuckle Rose" (Andy Razaf, Fats Waller) – 2:40

A 2-EP gatefold with the red cover was released in 1955. The tracks were:

1. "South"
2. "Alabama Jubilee"
3. "The Birth of the Blues"
4. "A Gay Ranchero"
5. "Have You Ever Been Lonely"
6. "Frankie and Johnny"

== Personnel ==
- Chet Atkins – guitar
- Dale Potter – fiddle
- Bud Isaacs – pedal steel guitar
- Ray Edenton – rhythm guitar
- John Gordy – piano, celesta
- Jerry Byrd – lap steel guitar
- Henry "Homer" Haynes – guitar
- Kenneth "Jethro" Burns – mandolin
- Jim Carney – drums
- Bob Moore – bass
