= Lover's Guitar =

Studio album by Chet Atkins
- Released: 1969
- Recorded: RCA "Nashville Sound" Studios, Nashville, TN
- Genres: Country, pop, classical
- Length: 34:48
- Label: RCA Victor LSP-4135 (Stereo)
- Producer: Bob Ferguson

Chet Atkins chronology
Solo Flights (1968)	Lover's Guitar (1969)	The Nashville String Band (1969)

Lover's Guitar is the thirty-seventh studio album by American guitarist Chet Atkins. It was released in 1969.

Professional ratings
Review scores
Source	Rating
Allmusic	2.5/5 stars

== Track listing ==
=== Side one ===
1. "Theme from Zorba the Greek" (Mikis Theodorakis) – 2:58
2. "Hawaiian Wedding Song" (Al Hoffman, Charles King, Dick Manning) – 3:13
3. "The Look of Love" (Burt Bacharach, Hal David) – 2:50
4. "Cajita de Musica (Little Music Box)" – 1:59
5. "Cancion del Viento (Song of the Wind)" – 3:48
6. "Estudio Brillante" (Francisco Tárrega) – 3:35

=== Side two ===
1. "La Madrugada (The Early Dawn)" – 2:25
2. "If I Should Lose You" (Ralph Rainger, Leo Robin) – 2:30
3. "Those Were the Days" (Gene Raskin) – 2:55
4. "The Odd Folks of Okracoke" (John D. Loudermilk) – 2:11
5. "Until It's Time for You to Go" (Buffy Sainte-Marie) – 3:42
6. "Recuerdos de la Alhambra" (Francisco Tárrega) – 3:07

== Personnel ==
- Chet Atkins – guitar
- Arranged by Chet Atkins and Bill McElhiney
