= Hometown Guitar =

Studio album by Chet Atkins
- Released: 1968
- Recorded: RCA's "Nashville Sound" Studio, Nashville, TN
- Genre: Country, pop
- Label: RCA Victor LPM-4017 (monaural), LSP-4017 (Stereo)
- Producer: Chet Atkins, Bob Ferguson

Chet Atkins chronology
Class Guitar (1967)	Hometown Guitar (1968)	Solid Gold 68 (1968)

Hometown Guitar is the thirty-fourth studio album by Chet Atkins. It peaked at number 17 on the Billboard Country Albums chart.

== Track listing ==
=== Side one ===
1. "Big Daddy"
2. "Sittin' on Top of the World" (Sam Chatmon)
3. "Huntin' Boots"
4. "Blue Guitar"
5. "Cattle Call"
6. "Back to Old Smokey Mountain"

=== Side two ===
1. "Sweet Georgia Brown" (Maceo Pinkard, Kenneth Casey)
2. "Blue Angel"
3. "Get on with It"
4. "Reed's Ramble"
5. "Pickin' Pot Pie"
6. "The Last Thing on My Mind"

== Personnel ==
- Chet Atkins – guitar
- Sonny Osbourne – banjo
- Engineered by Bill Vandevort
