= Solid Gold 68 =

Studio album by Chet Atkins
- Released: 1968
- Genre: Country, pop
- Length: 28:56
- Label: RCA Victor
- Producer: Felton Jarvis, Bob Ferguson

Chet Atkins chronology
Hometown Guitar (1968)	Solid Gold 68 (1968)	Solo Flights (1968)

Solid Gold 68 is the thirty-fifth studio album by American guitarist Chet Atkins, released on RCA Victor LSP-4061. It is the first in a series of three albums providing Chet with the opportunity to interpret some of the pop hits of the year. It reached No. 18 on the Country Album charts.

== Reception ==
Professional ratings
Review scores
Source	Rating
Allmusic	2/5 stars

Writing for Allmusic, critic Richard S. Ginell wrote of the album "a mostly overproduced, perfunctory collection of period pop hits that does neither the guitarist nor the tunes much good."

== Track listing ==
=== Side one ===
1. "Slick" (Herb Alpert/Pisano)– 2:57
2. "Lady Madonna" (Lennon–McCartney) – 2:30
3. "Prayer Meetin'" (Smith) – 2:47
4. "Sealed with a Kiss" (Peter Udell, Gary Geld) – 2:31
5. "Stoned Soul Picnic" (Laura Nyro) – 2:55
6. "The Sounds of Silence" (Paul Simon) – 2:52

=== Side two ===
1. "Mrs. Robinson" (Paul Simon) – 2:54
2. "Harper Valley PTA" (Tom T. Hall) – 2:43
3. "Light My Fire" (Densmore, Krieger, Manzarek, Morrison) – 3:05
4. "Sleep Safe and Warm (Lullaby from Rosemary's Baby)" (Kusik–Snyder–Komeda) – 3:03
5. "Grazing in the Grass" (Harry Elston, Philemon Hou)– 2:38
6. "It Never Hurts to Ask" (Saussy) – 2:36

== Personnel ==
- Chet Atkins – guitar
- Bill Walker, Cam Mullins – string arrangements
