= World's Greatest Melodies =

Studio album by The Nashville String Band
- Released: 1972
- Recorded: RCA Victor Studios, Nashville, TN
- Genre: Country
- Label: RCA Victor
- Producer: Chet Atkins, Ronny Light

Chet Atkins chronology
American Salute (1972)	World's Greatest Melodies (1972)	Alone (1973)

World's Greatest Melodies is an album by The Nashville String Band. The band consisted of Chet Atkins and Homer and Jethro.

== Track listing ==
=== Side one ===
1. "Battle Hymn of the Republic" (Julia Ward Howe; arranged by Chet Atkins and Kenneth Burns)
2. "Steel Guitar Rag" (Leon McAuliffe, Cliffie Stone, Merle Travis)
3. "Fascination" (Dick Manning, Fermo Dante Marchetti)
4. "Third Man Theme" (Anton Karas)
5. "Medley: I'm Thinking Tonight of My Blue Eyes/Wabash Cannonball/Hawaiian Wedding Song" (A.P. Carter/A.P. Carter/Al Hoffman, Charles E. King, Dick Manning)

=== Side two ===
1. "Lara's Theme" (Maurice Jarre, Paul Francis Webster)
2. "La Paloma" (Sebastián de Yradier; arranged by Chet Atkins and Kenneth Burns)
3. "St. Louis Blues" (W. C. Handy)
4. "Beer Barrel Polka" (Jaromír Vejvoda, Lew Brown, Václav Zeman, Wladimir Timm)
5. "Dixie" (Daniel Decatur Emmett; arranged by Chet Atkins and Kenneth Burns)

== Personnel ==
- Chet Atkins - guitar
- Henry "Homer" Haynes - guita
- Kenneth "Jethro" Burns - mandolin

with:

- Jerry Shook, Jimmy Capps, Pete Wade, Ray Edenton - guitar
- Henry Strzelecki - upright bass
- Jerry Byrd - steel guitar
- Johnny Gimble - mandolin
- Floyd Cramer - piano
- Jimmy Isbell, Kenny Buttrey - drums
- Farrell Morris - percussion
- Byron Bach, Martha McCrory - cello
- Albert Coleman, Jo Lennon Parker, Samuel Terranova, Sheldon Kurland, Steven Smith, Zina Schiff - violin
- Gary Van Osdale, Marvin Chantry - viola
- Billy Puett - woodwind
- The Jordanaires - vocal accompaniment
- Arranged by Bill McElhiney
