= C.G.P. =

Studio album by Chet Atkins
- Released: 1988
- Genre: Country, jazz, pop, rock
- Length: 45:05
- Label: Columbia
- Producer: Chet Atkins, Darryl Dybka, David Hungate

Chet Atkins chronology
Sails (1987)	C.G.P. (1988)	Neck and Neck (1990)

C.G.P. is the fifty-fifth studio album by Chet Atkins. It was released in 1988 by Columbia Records. The initials in the title refer to the Atkins-coined title "Certified Guitar Player", a moniker he assigned not only to himself but other guitarists he admired and felt contributed to the legacy of guitar playing.

Atkins performs a rare vocal tune on the live rendition of "I Still Can't Say Goodbye".

== Reception ==
Professional ratings
Review scores
Source	Rating
Allmusic	3/5 stars

Allmusic music critic Richard S. Ginell wrote of the album; "...the level of material is somewhat higher than it had been on some earlier albums, boosted by a handful of superior rock tunes."

== Track listing ==
1. "Chinook Winds" (Chet Atkins, Darryl Dybka) – 4:40
2. "Put Your Clothes On" (Atkins, Johnny Gimble) – 4:51
3. "Imagine" (John Lennon) – 4:05
4. "Light-Hearted Lisa" (T. J. White) – 4:31
5. "Knucklebusters" (Atkins, John Knowles) – 5:18
6. "Jethreaux" (Atkins, Burns, Dybka) – 3:55
7. "Which Way del Vecchio?" (Dybka) – 4:52
8. "Daydream" (John Sebastian) – 3:42
9. "Mockingbird Variations" (Atkins, Shel Silverstein) – 5:06
10. "I Still Can't Say Goodbye" (live) (Bob Blinn, Jimmy Moore) – 4:05

== Personnel ==
- Chet Atkins - guitar; vocals on “I Still Can’t Say Goodbye”
- Darryl Dybka - keyboards, drum programming, synthesizer
- Johnny Gimble - fiddle
- Steve Gibson - guitar
- Mark Hammond - drum programming
- Jim Horn - saxophone
- Mike Haynes - trumpet, flugelhorn
- David Hungate - bass
- Clayton Ivey - keyboards
- Mark Knopfler - guitar on "Imagine"
- Mike Lawler - synthesizer
- Larrie Londin - drums
- Randy McCormick - synthesizer
- Terry McMillan - percussion
- Larry Paxton - bass
- George Tidwell - trumpet, flugelhorn
- Don Sheffield - trumpet, flugelhorn

== Production ==
- Chet Atkins – producer
- David Hungate – producer
- Daryl Dybka – producer
- Joseph Bogan – mixing
- Denny Purcell – mastering
- Rick Horton – editing
- Don Cobb – engineer
- Mike Poston – engineer, mixing
- David Michael Kennedy – photography
- Garrison Keillor – liner notes
