= Yestergroovin =

Yestergroovin'

Studio album by Chet Atkins
- Released: 1970
- Recorded: RCA's "Nashville Sound" Studio, Nashville, Tennessee
- Genre: Country, pop, jazz
- Label: RCA Victor
- Producer: Bob Ferguson

Chet Atkins chronology
| Down Home (1970) | Yestergroovin' (1970) | Pickin' My Way (1970) |

Professional ratings
Review scores
| Source | Rating |
|---|---|
| Allmusic | 4/5 stars |

Yestergroovin' is the thirty-ninth studio album by guitarist Chet Atkins, released in 1970. Yestergroovin' was nominated for the 1970 Grammy Award for Best Country Instrumental Performance. It did not win, but Atkins's collaboration with Jerry Reed Me and Jerry did. He would be nominated twice in the same category again in 1973.

== Chart performance ==
The album debuted on the Billboard Top LPs on the 25th of March, peaking at No. 139 during a five-week stay on the chart.

== Reception ==
Allmusic stated that it is "a throwback to some of his earlier, less-cluttered, more musical albums. It's a relaxed, friendly, assured package... Lovely record; one of his best from this period.".

== Track listing ==
=== Side one ===
1. "Steeplechase Lane" (Jerry Reed Hubbard)
2. "Tennessee Pride"
3. "Rocky Top" (Felice Bryant, Boudleaux Bryant)
4. "Gotta Travel On"
5. "Cherokee" (Ray Noble) – 2:38
6. "Country Champagne" – 2:30

=== Side two ===
1. "Liberty" – 2:42
2. "Inka Dinka Doo" – 2:43 (Jimmy Durante, Ben Ryan)
3. "Bring Me Sunshine" (Sylvia Dee, Arthur Kent) – 2:40
4. "Yestergroovin'"
5. "How High the Moon" (Nancy Hamilton, Morgan Lewis) – 3:00

== Personnel ==
- Chet Atkins – guitar
- Producer – Bob Ferguson
- Al Pachucki – engineer
- Ray Butts – engineer
- Tom Pick – engineer
- Joe Clark – cover photo

== Charts ==
| Chart (1970) | Peak position |
|---|---|
| US Billboard Top LPs | 139 |
