= Stringin' Along with Chet Atkins (1953 album) =

Stringin' Along With Chet Atkins

Studio album by Chet Atkins
- Released: 1953
- Genre: Country, pop
- Label: RCA Victor LPM-3163
- Producer: Steve Sholes

Chet Atkins chronology
Chet Atkins' Gallopin' Guitar (1953)	Stringin' Along With Chet Atkins (1953)	A Session with Chet Atkins (1954)

Alternative Cover

Stringin' Along With Chet Atkins is the second studio album recorded by American guitarist Chet Atkins on the RCA Victor label. It was available as a 10-inch vinyl record. RCA subsequently released it as a 12-inch LP in 1955 with additional and omitted tracks.

The song "Main Street Breakdown" had been released as a single in 1949 and was a minor success. Chet commented in his autobiography, "It had a lot of notes and fast runs and DJs apparently loved it." Homer & Jethro played on the song with Anita Carter playing bass.

== Reception ==
Professional ratings
Review scores
Source	Rating
Allmusic	4.5/5 stars

== Track listing ==
- The gold cover release had a different track listing and order, substituting "12th Street Rag" for "Boogie Man Boogie"
1. "Blue Gypsy" (Atkins, Boudleaux Bryant) – 2:19
2. "Oh by Jingo!" (Lew Brown, Albert Von Tilzer) – 2:14
3. "Hello Ma Baby" (Joseph Howard, Ida Emerson) – 2:09
4. "Memphis Blues" (W. C. Handy, George Norton) – 2:11
5. "Alice Blue Gown" (Joseph McCarthy, Harry Tierney) – 2:06
6. "Indian Love Call" (Rudolf Friml, Oscar Hammerstein, Otto Harbach) – 2:39
7. "Main Street Breakdown" (Atkins) – 2:18
8. "Boogie Man Boogie" (Atkins) – 2:49

It was also released under the same title with the red cover as a two-disc gatefold 45 rpm EP (RCA EPB-1236) with a different track listing.

- Disc 1:
  - Side 1 – "Oh, By Jingo!" / "Indian Love Call"
  - Side 2 – "Memphis Blues" / "12th Street Rag"
- Disc 2:
  - Side 1 – "Gallopin' Guitar" / "St. Louis Blues"
  - Side 2 – "Alice Blue Gown" / "The Third Man Theme"

A gold-cover 45 rpm gatefold set EPB-3163 was released in the 1950s containing,

EPB-3163

- Disc 1:
  - Side 1 – "Oh, By Jingo!" / "Indian Love Call"
  - Side 2 – "Memphis Blues" / "Twelfth Street Rag"
- Disc 2:
  - Side 1 – "Main Street Breakdown" / "Hello Ma Baby"
  - Side 2 – "Alice Blue Gown" / "Blue Gypsy"

== Personnel ==
- Chet Atkins – guitar
