= Stringin' Along with Chet Atkins (1955 album) =

Studio album by Chet Atkins
- Released: 1955
- Genre: Country, pop
- Label: RCA Victor 1383 (Mono)
- Producer: Steve Sholes

Chet Atkins chronology
A Session with Chet Atkins (1954)	Stringin' Along with Chet Atkins (1955)	Chet Atkins in Three Dimensions (1955)

Stringin' Along with Chet Atkins is the fourth studio album recorded by American guitarist Chet Atkins released in 1955. It was a 12-inch re-release of the 1953 10-inch vinyl record of the same name with additional and omitted tracks.

== History ==
RCA packaged some of Atkins' early recordings between 1950 and 1953 originally released on 10" versions for this title. They filled the collection out with more tracks for this 12" LP. The 1967 re-issue is in "phoney stereo."

Atkins had two hit singles in 1955, "Mr. Sandman" and a guitar duet with Hank Snow called "Silver Bell." Also that year he endorsed a Gretsch guitar he helped design and built his first home studio in his garage.

== Reception ==
Professional ratings
Review scores
Source	Rating
Allmusic	3/5 stars

Allmusic music critic William Ruhlmann wrote of the album, "Atkins' playing is as distinctive as ever, and if the sources of the material are various, his style holds it together into a coherent collection."

== Track listing ==
=== Side one ===
1. "Oh by Jingo! (Oh by Gee, You're the Only Girl for Me)" (Lew Brown, Albert Von Tilzer)
2. "Indian Love Call" (Rudolf Friml, Oscar Hammerstein, Otto Harbach)
3. "Memphis Blues" (W. C. Handy, George A. Norton)
4. "Twelfth Street Rag" (Euday Bowman)
5. "Galloping on the Guitar" (Atkins)
6. "St. Louis Blues" (W. C. Handy)

=== Side two ===
1. "Main Street Breakdown" (Atkins)
2. "Hello Ma Baby" (Joseph E. Howard, Ida Emerson)
3. "Alice Blue Gown" (Joseph McCarthy, Harry Tierney)
4. "Blue Gypsy" (Atkins, Boudleaux Bryant)
5. "Black Mountain Rag" (Traditional)
6. "Third Man Theme" (Anton Karas)

== Personnel ==
- Chet Atkins – guitar
