= Chet Atkins Plays Back Home Hymns =

Studio album by Chet Atkins
- Released: 1962
- Recorded: Nashville, TN
- Genre: Country, gospel
- Length: 28:29
- Label: RCA Victor LSP-2601
- Producer: Anita Kerr

Chet Atkins chronology
| The Most Popular Guitar (1961) | Chet Atkins Plays Back Home Hymns (1962) | Caribbean Guitar (1962) |

Chet Atkins Plays Back Home Hymns is the seventeenth studio album of instrumental gospel hymns by guitarist Chet Atkins.

== Reception ==
Professional ratings
Review scores
| Source | Rating |
|---|---|
| Allmusic | 2.5/5 stars |

Writing for Allmusic, critic Jason Ankeny wrote that the album is "simply too brief to stand as a definitive collection of the guitarist's spiritual recordings; his instrumental work is impeccable of course, but performances of favorites like "Amazing Grace," "Just a Closer Walk with Thee" and "The Old Rugged Cross" pass by too quickly to properly whet the listener's appetite."

== Reissues ==
- Chet Atkins Plays Back Home Hymns was re-released by BMG in 1998.

== Track listing ==
=== Side one ===
1. "Take My Hand, Precious Lord" (Thomas A. Dorsey) – 2:43
2. "Amazing Grace" (John Newton) – 2:36
3. "Will the Circle Be Unbroken" (Traditional) – 2"07
4. "In the Garden" (C. Austin Miles) – 2:31
5. "When They Ring the Golden Bells" (Traditional) – 2:30
6. "Just As I Am" (William B. Bradbury, Charlotte Elliott) – 1:43

=== Side two ===
1. "Further Along" (Traditional) – 3:03
2. "Just a Closer Walk with Thee" (Traditional) – 2:05
3. "The Old Rugged Cross" (George Bennard) – 2:25
4. "Lonesome Valley" (Carter) – 2:02
5. "God Be With You" (Traditional) – 2:33
6. "Were You There" (Traditional) – 2:11

== Personnel ==
- Chet Atkins – guitar
