= Paul Yandell =

- Born: September 6, 1935; Mayfield, Kentucky, U.S.
- Died: November 21, 2011 (aged 76); Hendersonville, Tennessee, U.S.
- Genres: Country, fingerstyle
- Occupation: Guitarist
- Instrument: Guitar
- Years active: 1955-2011
- Formerly of: The Louvin Brothers

Paul Yandell (September 6, 1935 – November 21, 2011) was an American guitar player from Mayfield, Kentucky. Yandell played fingerstyle, a style he learned to play from his neighbors, influenced by Chet Atkins and Merle Travis. In 1955 he was hired by The Louvin Brothers and performed and recorded with them. From 1959 to 1961 he served in the US Army and on his return was a touring musician with Kitty Wells, Johnnie Wright, George Hamilton IV, and Jerry Reed.

From 1975 until the late 1990s, Yandell worked with Chet Atkins doing shows, recordings, and TV appearances, and produced an instructional video called Fingerstyle Legacy. After Atkins died in 2001, Yandell recorded seven CDs and was a consultant for guitars for Gretsch, most notably the limited edition stereo version of the Gretsch 6120, a model used by Atkins in the 1950s. He died in Hendersonville, Tennessee, of cancer, at age 76.

In 2011, Atkins' daughter Merle Atkins Russell bestowed the light-hearted Certified Guitar Player degree on Yandell. She then declared no more CGPs would be allowed by the Atkins estate.
