= Suzy Bogguss discography =

Discography for American country singer

- Studio albums: 16
- Compilation albums: 2
- Singles: 38
- Music videos: 20

Suzy Bogguss is an American country music singer. Her discography consists of 16 studio albums, two compilation albums, one live album, and two demo albums. Bogguss has released 38 singles, with six of those reaching the Top Ten of the US Billboard Hot Country Songs chart between 1992 and 1994. An additional six singles reached the Top 40 of the same chart between 1989 and 1998.

Bogguss' breakthrough album, Aces, was released in 1991. It reached the Top 20 of the Billboard Top Country Albums chart and featured four Top 15 singles on the country singles chart. The album was subsequently certified platinum by the Recording Industry Association of America, without having charted a number one single. Her next two releases, Voices in the Wind (1992) and Something Up My Sleeve (1993), were both certified gold by the Recording Industry Association of America.

Although recording and releasing material throughout the 1990s and 2000s, Bogguss has failed to match the success of her earlier albums. In the late-1990s, only one single cracked the Top 40 of the country charts, and the subsequent singles failed to reach the Top 60, or even chart at all. Her latest release, Prayin' for Sunshine, was released in November 2023.

== Studio albums ==
=== 1980s and 1990s ===
| Title | Album details | Peak positions | | | | Certifications |
| Title | Album details | US Country | US | CAN Country | UK | Certifications |
|---|---|---|---|---|---|---|
| Somewhere Between | Release date: March 21, 1989; Label: Capitol Records; Formats: LP, CD, cassette | 41 | — | — | — | |
| Moment of Truth | Release date: August 21, 1990; Label: Capitol Records; Formats: CD, cassette | — | — | — | — | |
| Aces | Release date: August 27, 1991; Label: Liberty Records; Formats: CD, cassette | 15 | 83 | 21 | — | US: Platinum |
| Voices in the Wind | Release date: October 6, 1992; Label: Liberty Records; Formats: CD, cassette | 31 | 116 | — | — | US: Gold |
| Something Up My Sleeve | Release date: September 21, 1993; Label: Liberty Records; Formats: CD, cassette | 27 | 121 | — | 69 | US: Gold |
| Simpatico (with Chet Atkins) | Release date: October 18, 1994; Label: Liberty Records; Formats: CD, cassette | 55 | — | — | — | |
| Give Me Some Wheels | Release date: July 23, 1996; Label: Capitol Records; Formats: CD, cassette | 51 | — | — | 143 | |
| Nobody Love, Nobody Gets Hurt | Release date: June 2, 1998; Label: Capitol Records; Formats: CD, cassette | 42 | — | — | — | |
| Suzy Bogguss | Release date: August 24, 1999; Label: Platinum Records; Formats: CD, cassette | 73 | — | — | — | |
"—" denotes releases that did not chart

=== 2000s and 2010s ===
| Title | Album details | Peak positions | | | |
| Title | Album details | US Country | US Indie | US Jazz | US Americana |
|---|---|---|---|---|---|
| Have Yourself a Merry Little Christmas | Release date: October 30, 2001; Label: Loyal Dutchess; Formats: CD | — | — | — | — |
| Swing | Release date: June 17, 2003; Label: Loyal Dutchess; Formats: CD | 66 | 46 | 12 | — |
| Sweet Danger | Release date: September 4, 2007; Label: Loyal Dutchess; Formats: CD, download | — | — | 8 | — |
| I'm Dreaming of a White Christmas | Release date: November 28, 2010; Label: Loyal Dutchess; Formats: CD, download | — | — | — | — |
| American Folk Songbook | Release date: August 2, 2011; Label: Loyal Dutchess; Formats: CD, download | — | — | — | — |
| Lucky | Release date: February 4, 2014; Label: Loyal Dutchess; Formats: CD, download | — | — | — | — |
| Aces Redux | Release date: August 18, 2016; Label: Loyal Dutchess; Formats: CD, download | — | — | — | — |
| Prayin' for Sunshine | Release date: November 3, 2023; Label: Loyal Dutchess; Formats: CD, download | — | — | — | 12 |
"—" denotes releases that did not chart

== Compilation albums ==
| Title | Album details | Peak positions | | Certifications |
| Title | Album details | US Country | US | Certifications |
|---|---|---|---|---|
| Greatest Hits | Release date: March 8, 1994; Label: Liberty Records; Formats: CD, cassette | 38 | 190 | US: Gold |
| 20 Greatest Hits | Release date: September 27, 2002; Label: Capitol Nashville; Formats: CD | — | — | |
"—" denotes releases that did not chart

== Boxed sets ==
| Title | Album details |
|---|---|
| Aces: The Definitive Capitol Collection | Release date: May 25, 2018; Label: Hump Head Records; Formats: CD |
"—" denotes releases that did not chart

== Demo albums ==
| Title | Album details |
|---|---|
| Suzy | Release date: 1981; Label: Old Shack Records; Formats: LP |
| Suzy Bogguss (Dollywood) Cassette | Release date: February 1986; Label: Suzy Bogguss Records; Formats: Cassette |

== Live albums ==
| Title | Album details |
|---|---|
| Live at Caffé Milano | Release date: July 31, 2001; Label: Loyal Dutchess; Formats: CD |

== Singles ==
| Year | Single | Peak positions | | | | Album |
| Year | Single | US Country | R&R Country | CAN Country | US Americana | Album |
|---|---|---|---|---|---|---|
| 1987 | "I Don't Want to Set the World on Fire" | 68 | — | — | — | Non-album single |
| 1987 | "Love Will Never Slip Away" | 69 | — | — | — | Non-album single |
| 1987 | "Come As You Were" | — | — | — | — | Non-album single |
| 1988 | "I Want to Be a Cowboy's Sweetheart" | 77 | — | — | — | Somewhere Between |
| 1988 | "Somewhere Between" | 46 | — | 57 | — | Somewhere Between |
| 1989 | "Cross My Broken Heart" | 14 | 15 | 17 | — | Somewhere Between |
| 1989 | "My Sweet Love Ain't Around" | 38 | 40 | 26 | — | Somewhere Between |
| 1990 | "Under the Gun" | 72 | — | 59 | — | Moment of Truth |
| 1990 | "All Things Made New Again" | 72 | — | — | — | Moment of Truth |
| 1991 | "Someday Soon" | 12 | 9 | 16 | — | Aces |
| 1991 | "Outbound Plane" | 9 | 6 | 9 | — | Aces |
| 1992 | "Aces" | 9 | 7 | 6 | — | Aces |
| 1992 | "Letting Go" | 6 | 4 | 9 | — | Aces / Voices in the Wind |
| 1992 | "Drive South" | 2 | 3 | 4 | — | Voices in the Wind |
| 1993 | "Heartache" | 23 | 16 | 74 | — | Voices in the Wind |
| 1993 | "Just Like the Weather" | 5 | 5 | 5 | — | Something Up My Sleeve |
| 1993 | "Hey Cinderella" | 5 | 4 | 2 | — | Something Up My Sleeve |
| 1994 | "You Wouldn't Say That to a Stranger" | 43 | 35 | 40 | — | Something Up My Sleeve |
| 1994 | "Souvenirs" | 65 | — | 84 | — | Something Up My Sleeve |
| 1994 | "One More for the Road" (with Chet Atkins) | — | — | — | — | Simpatico |
| 1994 | "Sorry Seems to Be the Hardest Word" (with Chet Atkins) | — | — | — | — | Simpatico |
| 1996 | "Give Me Some Wheels" | 60 | 49 | 31 | — | Give Me Some Wheels |
| 1996 | "No Way Out" | 53 | 47 | — | — | Give Me Some Wheels |
| 1997 | "She Said, He Heard" | 57 | 45 | 39 | — | Give Me Some Wheels |
| 1998 | "Somebody to Love" | 33 | 23 | 18 | — | Nobody Love, Nobody Gets Hurt |
| 1998 | "Nobody Love, Nobody Gets Hurt" | 63 | — | 80 | — | Nobody Love, Nobody Gets Hurt |
| 1998 | "From Where I Stand" | 67 | 50 | 91 | — | Nobody Love, Nobody Gets Hurt |
| 1999 | "Goodnight" | 66 | — | 74 | — | Suzy Bogguss |
| 2000 | "Love Is Blind" (with T. Graham Brown) | — | — | — | — | Suzy Bogguss |
| 2001 | "Keep Mom and Dad in Love" (with Billy Dean and introducing Jillian) | 51 | 48 | — | — | Non-album single |
| 2003 | "Cupid Shot Us Both With One Arrow" | — | — | — | — | Swing |
| 2007 | "In Heaven" | — | — | — | — | Sweet Danger |
| 2024 | "We Can Make it Alright" | — | — | — | 37 | Prayin' for Sunshine |
"—" denotes releases that did not chart

=== Christmas singles ===
| Year | Single | Album |
|---|---|---|
| 1989 | "Mr. Santa" | Non-album single |
| 1996 | "I Heard the Bells on Christmas Day" | Christmas for the 90's: Vol. 3 |

=== As a featured artist ===
| Year | Single | Peak positions | | | Album |
| Year | Single | US Country | R&R Country | CAN Country | Album |
|---|---|---|---|---|---|
| 1990 | "Tomorrow's World" | 74 | — | — | Non-album single |
| 1991 | "Hopelessly Yours" (Lee Greenwood with Suzy Bogguss) | 12 | 5 | 10 | A Perfect 10 |
| 1994 | "Teach Your Children" (as The Red Hots) | 75 | — | — | Red Hot + Country |
| 1994 | "Amazing Grace" (as The Maverick Choir) | — | — | — | Maverick: Music from and Inspired by the Motion Picture Soundtrack |
"—" denotes releases that did not chart

== Music videos ==
| Year | Video | Director |
|---|---|---|
| 1988 | "Somewhere Between" | Armanda Costanza |
| 1991 | "Cowboy Christmas Ball" (with Michael Martin Murphey) | |
| 1991 | "Hopelessly Yours" (with Lee Greenwood) | |
| 1991 | "Outbound Plane" | Deaton Flanigen |
| 1992 | "Letting Go" | Deaton Flanigen |
| 1992 | "Drive South" | Deaton Flanigen |
| 1993 | "Heartache" | Deaton Flanigen |
| 1993 | "Old Fashioned Love" (with Asleep at the Wheel) | Wayne Miller |
| 1993 | "Hey Cinderella" | Roger Pistole |
| 1994 | "You Wouldn't Say That to a Stranger" | Steven Goldmann |
| 1994 | "One More for the Road" (with Chet Atkins) | Deaton Flanigen |
| 1996 | "Give Me Some Wheels" | Roger Pistole |
| 1996 | "No Way Out" | Roger Pistole |
| 1998 | "Nobody Love, Nobody Gets Hurt" | Deaton Flanigen |
| 1999 | "Goodnight" | Tom Bevins |

=== Guest appearances ===
| Year | Video | Director |
|---|---|---|
| 1990 | "Tomorrow's World" | Gustavo Garzon |
| 1994 | "Teach Your Children" (as The Red Hots) | |
| 1994 | "Amazing Grace" (as The Maverick Choir) | Gil Bettman |
| 1994 | "He Thinks He'll Keep Her" (with Mary Chapin Carpenter, Emmylou Harris, Patty Loveless, Kathy Mattea, Pam Tillis, and Trisha Yearwood) | Bud Schaetzle |
| 1998 | "Back in the Saddle" (with Matraca Berg, Faith Hill, Patty Loveless, Martina McBride, and Trisha Yearwood) | Steven Goldmann |
