= Greatest Hits (Suzy Bogguss album) =

Greatest hits album by Suzy Bogguss
- Released: March 8, 1994
- Genre: Country
- Length: 34:31
- Label: Liberty
- Producer: Suzy Bogguss and Jimmy Bowen (tracks 2–8); Jerry Crutchfield (track 9); Wendy Waldman (tracks 1 and 10)

Suzy Bogguss chronology
Something Up My Sleeve (1993)	Greatest Hits (1994)	Simpatico (1994)

Professional ratings
Review scores
Source	Rating
Allmusic	link

Greatest Hits is the first compilation album by American country music singer Suzy Bogguss. It was released on March 8, 1994 via Liberty Records. Eight of her Top 40 singles are here including her Grammy-nominated duet with Lee Greenwood, previously available only on his own A Perfect 10 album. Her first two singles from Somewhere Between are included as well, even though neither reached Top 40.

== Track listing ==
No.	Title	Writer(s)	Length
1.	"Somewhere Between"	Merle Haggard	3:30
2.	"Someday Soon"	Ian Tyson	3:55
3.	"Outbound Plane"	Nanci Griffith, Tom Russell	2:52
4.	"Cross My Broken Heart"	Kye Fleming, Verlon Thompson	3:54
5.	"Letting Go"	Doug Crider, Matt Rollings	4:31
6.	"Heartache"	Lowell George, Ivan Ultz	3:12
7.	"Drive South"	John Hiatt	3:08
8.	"Aces"	Cheryl Wheeler	3:49
9.	"Hopelessly Yours" (duet with Lee Greenwood)	Don Cook, Curly Putman, Keith Whitley	2:46
10.	"I Want to Be a Cowboy's Sweetheart"	Patsy Montana	2:54

== Production ==
- Producer(s): Wendy Waldman, Jimmy Bowen, Suzy Bogguss, Jerry Crutchfield
- Liner Notes: Patsi Cox

== Chart performance ==
Chart (1994)	Peak position
U.S. Billboard Top Country Albums	38
U.S. Billboard 200	190

== Certifications ==
RIAA Certification

Cert. date	Country	Award
March 20, 1997	US	Gold

== Release details ==
Country	Date	Label	Format	Catalog
US	1994	Liberty	CD	C2-28457
			CS	C4-28457
