= Give Me Some Wheels =

Studio album by Suzy Bogguss
- Released: July 23, 1996
- Studios: Recording Arts, Soundshop Studios and The Tracking Room (Nashville, Tennessee)
- Genre: Country
- Length: 35:18
- Label: Liberty
- Producers: Trey Bruce Scott Hendricks

Suzy Bogguss chronology
Simpatico (1994)	Give Me Some Wheels (1996)	Nobody Love, Nobody Gets Hurt (1998)

Give Me Some Wheels is the seventh studio album by the American country music singer-songwriter Suzy Bogguss, released on July 23, 1996, through Liberty Records. For the album's title track and lead-off single, Bogguss reunited with Matraca Berg and Gary Harrison, the co-writers of one of her most successful singles, "Hey Cinderella". However, lacking any real support from her label, "Give Me Some Wheels" reached only the bottom of the country charts. This was followed by "No Way Out" (later recorded by Julie Roberts on her self-titled debut album).

== Track listing ==
Professional ratings
Review scores
Source	Rating
Allmusic	3/5 stars

No.	Title	Writer(s)	Length
1.	"Give Me Some Wheels"	Matraca Berg, Suzy Bogguss, Gary Harrison	2:37
2.	"Feeling 'Bout You"	Angela Kaset, Don Schlitz	3:35
3.	"Let's Get Real"	Bob Regan, Billy Spencer	3:28
4.	"Traveling Light"	Tom Shapiro, George Teren	3:29
5.	"Live to Love Another Day"	Liz Hengber, Will Robinson	3:43
6.	"No Way Out"	Marcus Hummon, Darrell Scott	3:19
7.	"Fall"	Trey Bruce, Craig Wiseman	4:04
8.	"Saying Goodbye to a Friend"	Kaset, Doug Gill	3:29
9.	"She Said, He Heard"	Bogguss, Schlitz	3:54
10.	"Far and Away"	Bogguss, Doug Crider	3:43
Total length:			35:18

== Personnel ==
- Suzy Bogguss – vocals, backing vocals (10)
- Matt Rollings – acoustic piano
- Bill Cuomo – synthesizers
- Reese Wynans – Hammond B3 organ
- J.T. Corenflos – electric guitars, acoustic guitars
- Billy Crain – acoustic slide guitar
- Dann Huff – electric guitars
- Brent Rowan – electric guitars
- Michael Spriggs – acoustic guitars
- Paul Franklin – steel guitar
- Jonathan Yudkin – mandolin, fiddle
- Leland Sklar – bass
- Lonnie Wilson – drums
- Tom Roady – percussion
- David Campbell – string arrangements
- Anthony LaMarchina – strings
- Lee Larrison – strings
- Bob Mason – strings
- Pamela Sixfin – strings
- Alan Umstead – strings
- Kristin Wilkinson – strings
- Steve Hornbeak – backing vocals (1, 3, 4, 7)
- Harry Stinson – backing vocals (1, 2, 9)
- Lisa Gregg – backing vocals (2, 7)
- Karen Staley – backing vocals (3, 4)
- Beth Nielsen Chapman – backing vocals (5)
- Marcus Hummon – backing vocals (6)
- Darrell Scott – backing vocals (6)
- Deborah Allen – backing vocals (9)
- Gerald Boyd – backing vocals (9)

== Production ==
- Trey Bruce – producer
- Scott Hendricks – producer, additional recording
- Mike Bradley – recording
- Steve Marcantonio – mixing, additional recording
- John Dickson – recording assistant
- David Buchanan – additional recording
- Russ Martin – additional recording, additional recording assistant, mix assistant
- Greg Parker – additional recording assistant
- Daryl Roudebush – additional recording assistant
- Glenn Meadows – mastering at Masterfonics (Nashville, Tennessee)
- Karen Cronin – art direction, design
- Susan Levy – art direction
- Nancy H. Williams – art production
- Mark Tucker – photography
- Earl Cox – hair
- Mary Beth Felts – make-up
- Claudia Fowler – wardrobe
- Ten Ten Management, Inc. – management
- EMI Music Dist. – distributor

== Chart performance ==
=== Album ===
Chart (1996)	Peak position
U.S. Billboard Top Country Albums	51

=== Singles ===
Year	Single	Peak positions	
Year	Single	US Country	CAN Country
1996	"Give Me Some Wheels"	60	31
1996	"No Way Out"	53	—
1997	"She Said, He Heard"	57	39

== Release details ==
Country	Date	Label	Format	Catalog
US	1996	Liberty	CD	36460
US	1996	Liberty	CS	36460
