= A Perfect 10 =

Studio album by Lee Greenwood
- Released: April 30, 1991
- Recorded: 1991
- Genre: Country
- Length: 33:29
- Label: Capitol Records
- Producer: Jerry Crutchfield

Lee Greenwood chronology
Holdin' a Good Hand (1990)	A Perfect 10 (1991)	When You're in Love (1991)

Singles from A Perfect 10
- 1. "Hopelessly Yours" Released: 1991

A Perfect 10 is the tenth studio album by American country music singer Lee Greenwood. The album was released on April 30, 1991, by Capitol Records.

== Track listing ==
No.	Title	Writer(s)	Length
1.	"Looking at a Sure Thing" (featuring Carol Chase)	Kent Robbins, Paul Williams	2:53
2.	"Hopelessly Yours" (featuring Suzy Bogguss)	Keith Whitley, Curly Putman, Don Cook	2:48
3.	"I'm Not Missin' Anything" (featuring Karen Staley)	Karen Staley, Gary Harrison	2:42
4.	"We're Both to Blame" (featuring Tanya Tucker)	Beth Nielsen Chapman	3:12
5.	"If You Don't Know Me by Now" (featuring Donna McElroy)	Kenneth Gamble, Leon Huff	3:56
6.	"I'd Give Anything" (featuring Barbara Mandrell)	Lisa Daniel, Naomi Martin	3:15
7.	"The Will to Love" (featuring Wild Rose)	Skip Ewing, Don Sampson	2:18
8.	"From Now On" (featuring Lacy J. Dalton)	Michael Bolton, Eric Kaz	4:16
9.	"It Wasn't Love Before" (featuring Marie Osmond)	Michael McLean	3:58
10.	"You're Not Alone" (featuring Cee Cee Chapman)	Judy Fields, Earl Bud Lee	4:13
Total length:			33:29

== Musicians ==
Adapted from liner notes.

- Eddie Bayers - drums
- Paul Franklin - steel guitar
- Steve Gibson - acoustic guitar, electric guitar
- Lee Greenwood - lead vocals
- Rob Hajacos - fiddle
- Vicki Hampton - background vocals
- David Innis - synthesizer
- Mike Lawler - synthesizer
- Paul Leim - drums
- Donna McElroy - background vocals
- Michael Rhodes - bass guitar
- Chris Rodriguez - background vocals
- Matt Rollings - piano, synthesizer
- Brent Rowan - acoustic guitar, electric guitar
- Gary Smith - piano
- Bob Wray - bass guitar
- Curtis Young - background vocals

== Charts ==
Chart (1991)	Peak position
US Top Country Albums (Billboard)	38
