= Cross My Broken Heart =

Cross My Broken Heart may refer to:

- "Cross My Broken Heart" (The Jets song), 1987
- "Cross My Broken Heart" (Sinitta song), 1987
- "Cross My Broken Heart" (Suzy Bogguss song), 1989
