= Something Up My Sleeve =

Studio album by Suzy Bogguss
- Released: September 21, 1993
- Studio: Emerald Sound Studios, Sound Emporium Studios, Sound Stage Studios, Studio 6, Treasure Isle Studios and Masterfonics (Nashville, Tennessee); Ground Control Studios (Burbank, California); Compass Point Studios (Nassau, Bahamas)
- Genre: Country
- Length: 34:22
- Label: Liberty
- Producer: Suzy Bogguss; Jimmy Bowen

Suzy Bogguss chronology
Voices in the Wind (1992)	Something Up My Sleeve (1993)	Greatest Hits (1994)

Something Up My Sleeve is the fifth studio album by the American country music singer-songwriter Suzy Bogguss, released in 1993 on Liberty Records. Something Up My Sleeve produced two Top 10 singles: "Just Like the Weather" and "Hey Cinderella", which Bogguss co-wrote with Grammy-nominated songwriters Matraca Berg and Gary Harrison. Two other singles, "You Wouldn't Say That to a Stranger" and "Souvenirs", both failed to reach the top 40.

The UK release included the bonus track "Take It to the Limit," which Bogguss recorded for the Eagles tribute album, Common Thread: The Songs of the Eagles.

== Critical reception ==
Professional ratings
Review scores
Source	Rating
AllMusic	3/5 stars
Entertainment Weekly	B

Bryan Buss of AllMusic wrote that the album is "one of Suzy Bogguss' finest and most consistent albums."

== Track listing ==
No.	Title	Writer(s)	Length
1.	"Diamonds and Tears"	Matraca Berg, Gary Harrison	3:19
2.	"Just Like the Weather"	Suzy Bogguss, Doug Crider	3:17
3.	"I Keep Comin' Back to You"	Beth Nielsen Chapman, Bill Lloyd	3:04
4.	"You Never Will"	Bogguss, Crider, Steve Dorff	3:26
5.	"You'd Be the One"	Bogguss, Pat Bunch, Crider	3:15
6.	"Hey Cinderella"	Berg, Bogguss, Harrison	4:04
7.	"Souvenirs"	Gretchen Peters	4:09
8.	"You Wouldn't Say That to a Stranger"	Bunch, Crider	3:19
9.	"No Green Eyes"	Bogguss, Bunch, Crider	2:36
10.	"Something Up My Sleeve" (duet with Billy Dean)	Suzi Ragsdale, Verlon Thompson	3:30

== Personnel ==
- Suzy Bogguss – vocals
- Matt Rollings – keyboards
- Johnny Neel – Hammond B3 organ
- Brent Rowan – electric guitars, acoustic guitars
- Pat Bergeson – electric guitar solo (4)
- Darrell Scott – electric guitar solo (8)
- Dan Dugmore – steel guitar
- Leland Sklar – bass
- Eddie Bayers – drums
- Tom Roady – percussion
- Terry McMillan – harmonica
- David Campbell – string arrangements and conductor (4)
- Suzie Katayama – string contractor (4)
- Sid Page – concertmaster (4)
- Matraca Berg – backing vocals
- Gerald Alan Boyd – backing vocals
- Beth Nielsen Chapman – backing vocals
- Ted Hewitt – backing vocals
- Martina McBride – backing vocals
- Suzi Ragsdale – backing vocals
- Harry Stinson – backing vocals
- Billy Dean – vocals (10)

== Production ==
- Suzy Bogguss – producer
- Jimmy Bowen – producer
- John Guess – mixing, recording (1–9), additional recording (1–9)
- Marty Williams – recording, mix assistant, additional recording (1–9), vocal recording (1–9)
- Gabe Veltry – string engineer (4)
- Derek Bason – mix assistant, recording assistant (10)
- Ken Hutton – recording assistant (10)
- Glenn Meadows – digital editing, mastering
- Sherri Halford – creative director
- Virginia Team – art direction
- Jerry Joyner – design
- Randee St. Nicholas – photography
- Eric Barnard – hair stylist, make-up
- Vivian Turner – stylist
- Morris, Bliesener & Associates – management
- EMI Music Dist. – distributor

== Chart performance ==
=== Album ===
Chart (1993)	Peak position
U.S. Billboard 200	121
U.S. Billboard Top Country Albums	27

=== Year-end charts ===
Chart (1994)	Position
US Top Country Albums (Billboard)	73

=== Singles ===
Year	Single	Peak positions	
Year	Single	US Country	CAN Country
1993	"Just Like the Weather"	5	5
1993	"Hey Cinderella"	5	2
1994	"You Wouldn't Say That to a Stranger"	43	40
1994	"Souvenirs"	65	84

== Certifications ==
RIAA Certification

Certification date	Country	Award
September 9, 1995	United States	Gold

== Release details ==
Country	Date	Label	Format	Catalog
US	1993	Liberty	CD	89261
US	1993	Liberty	CS	89261
US	1998	EMI-Capitol Special Markets	CD	20003
