= Read My Licks =

Studio album by Chet Atkins
- Released: 1994
- Recorded: Nashville, TN
- Genre: Country, pop
- Length: 42:22
- Label: Columbia
- Producer: Chet Atkins, David Hungate

Chet Atkins chronology
| Jazz From the Hills (1994) | Read My Licks (1994) | Simpatico (1994) |

Read My Licks is the fifty-sixth studio album by American guitarist Chet Atkins.

David Hungate and Atkins again co-produce with a number of guest musicians. Suzy Bogguss contributes a lead vocal on "After You've Gone". She and Atkins released a duet album the same year. Steve Wariner joins Atkins in a vocal as well as a guitar duet on "Read My Licks".

At the Grammy Awards of 1994, "Young Thing" won the Grammy Award for Best Country Instrumental Performance.

Professional ratings
Review scores
| Source | Rating |
|---|---|
| Allmusic | 2/5 stars |

== Track listing ==
1. "Young Thing" (Atkins) – 3:14
2. "Mountains of Illinois" (Atkins, Pat Bergeson) – 4:10
3. "After You've Gone" (Creamer, Layton) – 3:31
4. "Every Now and Then" (Atkins, Goodrum) – 3:01
5. "Somebody Loves Me Now" (R. L. Kass) – 4:07
6. "Norway" (Claes Neeb) – 3:41
7. "Read My Licks" (Allen, Jones) – 4:34
8. "Take a Look at Her Now" (Bergeson, Kass) – 3:56
9. "Around the Bend" (Atkins, Jerry Reed) – 3:45
10. "Dream" (Johnny Mercer) – 4:35
11. "Vincent" (Don McLean) – 3:48

== Personnel ==
- Chet Atkins – guitar, vocals
- Suzy Bogguss – vocals
- Pat Bergeson – guitar, percussion
- David Hungate – bass
- John Jarvis – keyboards
- Randy Goodrum – keyboards
- Floyd Cramer – keyboards
- Darryl Dybka – keyboards
- Larry Knechtel – piano
- Jim Horn – saxophone
- George Benson – guitar
- Eric Johnson – guitar
- Mark Knopfler – guitar
- R. L. Kass – guitar
- Steve Wariner – guitar, vocals
- Paul Yandell – guitar
- Stuart Duncan – fiddle
- Lonnie Wilson – drums
