= Sneakin' Around =

Studio album by Chet Atkins and Jerry Reed
- Released: October 1991
- Recorded: Chet Atkins Workshop, Nashville, TN
- Genre: Country, pop
- Label: Columbia
- Producer: Darryl Dybka, Chet Atkins, Jerry Reed

Chet Atkins chronology
C.G.P. (1988)	Sneakin' Around (1991)	Galloping Guitar: The Early Years (1993)

Chet Atkins Collaborations chronology
Neck and Neck (1990)	Sneakin' Around (1991)	Galloping Guitar: The Early Years (1993)

Sneakin' Around is a collaborative album by American guitarists Chet Atkins and Jerry Reed, released in 1991. Reed and Atkins had done a series of recording collaborations nearly 20 years before this release. It peaked at No. 68 on the Billboard Country Albums charts.

At the Grammy Awards of 1993, Sneakin' Around won the Grammy Award for Best Country Instrumental Performance. Chet was also nominated that year for his work with The Chieftains' "Tahitian Skies".

== Reception ==
Professional ratings
Review scores
Source	Rating
Allmusic	4/5 stars

Allmusic music critic Richard S. Ginell called the album a "most welcome" encore and wrote; "the old Atkins/Reed country ways filter in, the rapport and good humor between the two intact and bubbling..."

== Track listing ==
1. "Summertime" (George Gershwin, Ira Gershwin, DuBose Heyward)
2. "Cajun Stripper" (Doug Kershaw / Rusty Kershaw)
3. "Vaudville Daze" (Chet Atkins / Jerry Reed)
4. "Here We Are" (Chet Atkins / Billy Edd Wheeler)
5. "The Claw" (Jerry Reed)
6. "First Born" (Jerry Reed)
7. "Major Attempt at a Minor Thing" (Jerry Reed)
8. "Gibson Girl" (Wayne Simmons)
9. "Sneakin' Around" (R. L. Kass)
10. "Nifty Fifties" (Rocky Stone)
11. "Here Comes That Girl" (Chet Atkins / Darryl Dybka)

== Personnel ==
- Chet Atkins - guitar
- Jerry Reed - guitar
- David Hungate - bass
- Mark O'Connor - fiddle
- Mark Knopfler - guitar
- Suzy Bogguss - background vocals on "Nifty Fifties"
- Amy Grant - background vocals on "Nifty Fifties"
- Paul Yandell - guitar
- Darryl Dybka - keyboards
- Pat Bergeson – guitar
- Johnny Gimble – fiddle
- Terry McMillan – harmonica, percussion
- Larrie Londin – drums, percussion
- Gary Chapman – background vocals
- Vicki Hampton – background vocals

== Chart performance ==
Chart (1992)	Peak position
U.S. Billboard Top Country Albums	68
