= Salt lick (disambiguation) =

A salt lick is a salt deposit that animals regularly lick.

Salt lick or Saltlick may also refer to:

== Places ==
=== Bodies of water ===
- Saltlick Creek (Little Kanawha River), a tributary of the Little Kanawha River in West Virginia
- Salt Lick Creek (Susquehanna River), a tributary of the Susquehanna River in Pennsylvania

=== Communities ===
- Salt Lick, Kentucky, a city in Bath County
- Salt Lick Town, also known as Seekunk, a Mingo village destroyed by William Crawford during Dunmore's War
- Saltlick Township, Fayette County, Pennsylvania

== Music ==
Albums

- Salt Lick/God's Balls, an album released by the band Tad

Songs

- "Salt Lick", a song on the Jeff Coffin album, Commonality
- "Salt Lick", the first ZZ Top single
- "Salt Lick", a song on the Tribal Tech album, Face First
- "Airstream Trailer Orgy / Salt Lick Blues", a song on the Gamble Rogers album, Sorry Is As Sorry Does
- "The Salt Lick", a song on the Gaelic Storm album, Bring Yer Wellies

== Brands and enterprises ==
- Salt Lick Publishing, publishers of the monthly magazine QSaltLake
- The Salt Lick, a barbecue restaurant in Driftwood, Texas
