= Voices in the Wind (album) =

Studio album by Suzy Bogguss
- Released: October 6, 1992
- Studio: Emerald Sound Studios, Sound Stage Studios and Masterfonics (Nashville, Tennessee); The Complex and Soundworks West (Los Angeles, California)
- Genre: Country (New Traditionalist)
- Length: 38:01
- Label: Liberty
- Producer: Suzy Bogguss; Jimmy Bowen

Suzy Bogguss chronology
Aces (1991)	Voices in the Wind (1992)	Something Up My Sleeve (1993)

Professional ratings
Review scores
Source	Rating
Allmusic	3/5 stars
Entertainment Weekly	B−

Voices in the Wind is the fourth studio album by American country music singer Suzy Bogguss. It was released on October 6, 1992, via Liberty Records. It earned her a second straight gold record and her highest-charting single ever, the No. 2 cover of John Hiatt's "Drive South."

"Letting Go," a single from Aces which was co-written by Bogguss's husband Doug Crider, peaked at No. 6 on the Billboard Hot Country Songs chart not long before the release of Voices in the Wind. In an effort to capitalize on the single's success, it was included on the later album as well.

== Track listing ==
No.	Title	Writer(s)	Length
1.	"Heartache"	Lowell George, Ivan Ulz	3:10
2.	"Drive South"	John Hiatt	3:05
3.	"Don't Wanna"	Cheryl Wheeler	3:26
4.	"How Come You Go to Her"	Suzy Bogguss, Michael Garvin, Anthony L. Smith	3:17
5.	"Other Side of the Hill"	Chuck Pyle	3:21
6.	"In the Day"	Bogguss, Doug Crider	3:37
7.	"Love Goes Without Saying"	Crider, Tony Haselden	3:12
8.	"Eat at Joe's"	Matraca Berg, Gary Harrison	3:36
9.	"Lovin' a Hurricane"	Hiatt	2:52
10.	"Letting Go"	Crider, Matt Rollings	4:29
11.	"Cold Day in July"	Richard Leigh	3:30

== Personnel ==
Musicians

- Suzy Bogguss – vocals
- Matt Rollings – acoustic piano
- Johnny Neel – keyboards (4, 6, 7)
- John Barlow Jarvis – Yamaha DX7 (10)
- Brent Rowan – guitars
- Bucky Baxter – electric guitar (2), steel guitar (3)
- Gerald Alan Boyd – acoustic guitar (6)
- Mike Henderson – slide guitar (9)
- Dan Dugmore – steel guitar (1, 4–6), EBow (6), lap steel guitar (9)
- Sam Bush - mandolin (1, 2)
- Leland Sklar – bass
- Eddie Bayers – drums
- Tom Roady – percussion (1–9)
- Mark Morris – percussion (8)
- Jimmie Fadden – harmonica (5)
- Kirk "Jelly Roll" Johnson – harmonica (9, 11)
- Mark O'Connor – fiddle (8)
- David Campbell – string arrangements and conductor (6, 7, 10, 11)
- Suzie Katayama – string contractor (6, 7, 10, 11)
- Sid Page – concertmaster (6, 7, 10, 11)

Background vocals

- Vince Gill – backing vocals (1, 10)
- Harry Stinson – backing vocals (1–4, 7–11)
- Suzy Bogguss – backing vocals (2, 6–10)
- Gerald Alan Boyd – backing vocals (3, 7–9)
- Ted Hewitt – backing vocals (3, 7–9)
- Beth Nielsen Chapman – backing vocals (4, 9, 11)
- Karen Staley – backing vocals (4, 9, 11)
- Bob Carpenter – backing vocals (5)
- Jeff Hanna – backing vocals (5)
- Jimmy Ibbotson – backing vocals (5)
- Mike Reid – backing vocals (6)
- Eddie Bayers – backing vocals (8)
- Doug Crider – backing vocals (8)
- John Guess – backing vocals (8)
- Abbe Medic – backing vocals (8)
- Mark Morris – backing vocals (8)
- Matt Rollings – backing vocals (8)
- Brent Rowan – backing vocals (8)
- Leland Sklar – backing vocals (8)
- Janie West – backing vocals (8)

== Production ==
- Suzy Bogguss – producer
- Jimmy Bowen – producer
- John Guess – digital recording, overdub recording, mixing
- Marty Williams – overdub recording, recording assistant, mix assistant
- Frank Wolf – string recording (6, 7, 11)
- Roger Nichols – string recording (10)
- Glenn Meadows – digital editing, mastering
- Janie West – song selection assistant
- Virginia Team – art direction
- Jerry Joyner – design
- Randee Saint Nicholas – photography
- Vanessa Ware – stylist
- Mary Beth Felts – hair stylist, make-up
- Morris, Bliesener and Associates – management
- EMI Music Dist. – distributor

== Chart performance ==
=== Album ===
Chart (1992)	Peak position
U.S. Billboard Top Country Albums	31
U.S. Billboard 200	116

=== Year-end charts ===
Chart (1993)	Position
US Top Country Albums (Billboard)	62

=== Singles ===
Year	Single	Peak positions	
Year	Single	US Country	CAN Country
1992	"Letting Go"	6	9
1992	"Drive South"	2	4
1993	"Heartache"	23	74

== Certifications ==
RIAA Certification

Cert. Date	Country	Award
10/12/93	USA	Gold

== Release details ==
Country	Date	Label	Format	Catalog
US	1992	Liberty	CD	C2-98585
			CS	C4-98585
US	1993	Capitol	CD	98585
US	1996	Alliance	CD	98585
