= Somewhere Between =

Somewhere Between may refer to:

- Somewhere Between (album)
- Somewhere Between (TV series)
