= Bloom (Jeff Coffin album) =

Studio album by Jeff Coffin Mu'tet
- Released: February 1, 2005
- Recorded: June 2003
- Genre: Jazz
- Length: 59:41
- Label: Compass
- Producer: Jeff Coffin

Jeff Coffin Mu'tet chronology
Go-Round (2001)	Bloom (2005)

Bloom was the fourth album released by Jeff Coffin, and was issued in 2005. This album was the second album recorded and released with the Mu'tet, a constantly changing group of guest musicians that play with Coffin.

== Reception ==
Professional ratings
Review scores
Source	Rating
AllMusic	3.5/5 stars
All About Jazz	3.5/5 stars

In a review for AllMusic, Jonathan Widran wrote: "All over the place? Sure. Self-indulgent? Maybe. But take away a track or two and the open-minded listener has probably never had this much crazy fun on one collection. So get over it."

Matt Merewitz of All About Jazz stated: "With Bloom Coffin and the Mu'tet successfully take the listener on a sonic journey through such an abundance of styles, colors, and textures that any attempt to box Coffin or the Mu'tet into one singular style would be an exercise in futility. Check out this record. You'll be glad you did."

Writing for Jambands.com, Karl Kukta noted that, with the album, "Coffin has decided to pretty much stick with the recipe," and drew comparisons with the music of Béla Fleck and the Flecktones, commenting: "The perpetually buoyant vibe — the frequent use of complex time signatures — the benign infusion of Eastern and Western music that teeters ever so closely to the still waters of New Age and smooth jazz... am I missing anything?"

== Track listing ==
All tracks by Jeff Coffin except where noted.

1. "Move Your Rug...processional (Blues for Otha)" – 1:40
2. "Better Do Your Thing" – 6:16
3. "The Evil Boweevil" (Pat Bergeson, Coffin, Tom Giampietro) – 4:43
4. "My Dog Chunks" (Coffin, Giampietro, Jones) – 5:51
5. "The Mad Hatter Rides Again" – 3:55
6. "Circle of Wills" – 2:33
7. "Hatim" (Balyamani, Coffin)– 7:05
8. "Bloom" – 5:43
9. "Old Jack Craw" – 4:25
10. "As Light Through Leaves" – 8:16
11. "Weird Beard" – 3:38
12. "Wobble" – 5:34

== Personnel ==
- Jeff Coffin – saxophones
- Jeff Sipe – drums and percussion
- Victor Wooten – electric and acoustic bass
- DJ Logic – turntables
- Béla Fleck – banjo
- Chris Thile – mandolin
- Tyler Wood – piano/B-3
- Pat Bergeson – guitar
- Derek Philip Jones – electric and acoustic bass
- Futureman – percussion
- Johny Neel – B-3, lead vocals
- Kirk Whalum – soprano sax
- Rod McGaha – trumpet
- Joe Murphy – tuba
- Roy Agee – trombone
- Tom Giampietro – drums
- Paul Brantley – cello
- Noa Ben-Amotz – percussion
- Rahsaan Barber – tenor sax
- Roland Barber – trombone
- OfficerFishDumplings – programming
- W.O. Smith Children's Choir – angelic vocals
- Derico Watson – drums
