= Simpatico (Suzy Bogguss and Chet Atkins album) =

Studio album by Suzy Bogguss and Chet Atkins
- Released: October 18, 1994
- Studio: Emerald Sound Studios, Sound Stage Studios, Studio 6, Masterfonics, Javelina Studios, CA Workshop and Secret Sound (Nashville, Tennessee); The Plant Studios (Sausalito, California)
- Genre: Country (New Traditionalist)
- Length: 39:07
- Label: Liberty
- Producer: Suzy Bogguss John Guess

Suzy Bogguss chronology
Greatest Hits (1994)	Simpatico (1994)	Give Me Some Wheels (1996)

Chet Atkins chronology
Read My Licks (1994)	Simpatico (1994)	Almost Alone (1996)

Professional ratings
Review scores
Source	Rating
AllMusic	link

Simpatico is an album by Suzy Bogguss and Chet Atkins, released in 1994.

== History ==
Atkins and Bogguss were recognized for their collaborations by several music awarding bodies. They were nominated for the 1996 Grammy award for Best Country & Western Vocal Collaboration (for the song "All My Loving" on the Beatles tribute album Come Together: America Salutes The Beatles) but did not win.

They were also nominated for the 1995 CMA Vocal Event of the Year award, for "Sorry Seems to Be the Hardest Word". The winners were Shenandoah and Alison Krauss for "Somewhere in the Vicinity of the Heart".

At the 1995 TNN/Music City News Country Awards, they were nominated for the Vocal Collaboration award. George Jones and Alan Jackson won.

== Track listing ==
1. "In the Jailhouse Now" (Jimmie Rodgers) – 3:11
2. "When She Smiled at Him" (Joanie Beeson, Michael Johnson) – 3:06
3. "Forget About It" (R. L. Kass) – 4:22
4. "Wives Don't Like Old Girlfriends" (Shane Fontayne, Randy VanWarmer) – 4:12
5. "Sorry Seems to Be the Hardest Word" (Elton John, Bernie Taupin) – 3:59
6. "Two Shades of Blue" (Deborah Allen, Bobby Braddock, Rafe Van Hoy) – 3:25
7. "One More for the Road" (Atkins, Bogguss, Doug Crider) – 4:26
8. "I Still Miss Someone" (Johnny Cash, Roy Cash Jr.) – 3:40
9. "You Bring Out the Best in Me" (Bogguss, Crider, Steve Dorff) – 3:34
10. "This Is the Beginning" (Pat Donohue) – 5:12

== Personnel ==
=== Musicians ===
- Suzy Bogguss – vocals
- Chet Atkins – vocals, electric guitar, acoustic guitar, gut-string guitar, Del Vecchio guitar
- Matt Rollings – acoustic piano
- Mike Lawler – synthesizers
- Flaco Jiménez – concertina
- Brent Rowan – acoustic guitar, electric guitars
- Pat Bergeson – acoustic guitar, harmonica
- R. L. Kass – acoustic guitar
- Roy Huskey, Jr. – bass
- Leland Sklar – bass
- Glenn Worf – bass
- Harry Stinson – drums, backing vocals
- Carlos Vega – drums
- Tom Roady – percussion
- Mark O'Connor – fiddle
- Nashville String Machine – strings
- David Campbell – string arrangements and conductor
- Carl Gorodetzky – concertmaster
- Gerald Boyd – backing vocals
- Beth Nielsen Chapman – backing vocals
- Vince Gill – backing vocals
- Sons of the San Joaquin (Jack Hannah, Joe Hannah and Lon Hannah) – backing vocals

=== Production ===
- Suzy Bogguss – producer
- John Guess – producer, recording, mixing
- Derek Bason – additional recording, recording assistant, mix assistant
- Doug Crider – additional engineer
- John Thomas II – additional recording assistant
- Glenn Meadows – mastering at Masterfonics
- Janie West – production coordinator
- Virginia Team – art direction
- Jerry Joyner – design
- Frank W. Ockenfels III – photography
- Claudia Fowler – stylist
- Earl Cox – hair stylist
- Mary Beth Felts – make-up
- EMI Music Dist. – distributor

== Chart performance ==
=== Album ===
Chart (1994)	Peak position
U.S. Billboard Top Country Albums	55

=== Singles ===
Year	Single
1994	"One More for the Road"
1994	"Sorry Seems to Be the Hardest Word"

== Release history ==
Country	Date	Label	Format	Catalog
US	1994	Liberty	CD	29606
US	1994	Liberty	CS	29606
