= Galloping Guitar: The Early Years =

Compilation album by Chet Atkins
- Released: 1993
- Recorded: 1940–Nov 17, 1954
- Genre: Country
- Label: Bear Family
- Producer: Stephen H. Sholes, Chet Atkins

Chet Atkins chronology
Sneakin' Around (1991)	Galloping Guitar: The Early Years (1993)	Jazz From the Hills (1994)

Galloping Guitar: The Early Years is a multi-disc box-set retrospective recording by American guitarist Chet Atkins, released in 1993 on the Bear Family label.

== History ==
This large boxed set (four CDs, 116 songs) focuses on Atkins' earliest recordings from 1940 to 1954. Early in his career, Atkins was signed and marketed mainly as a vocalist who played guitar. The majority of this set includes Chet's vocal releases as well as guest vocalists. There are a number of instrumentals featured.

The track list is more extensive than Guitar Legend: The RCA Years, covering much of the same material while adding four previously unavailable songs. There are many early Atkins originals, and also a large sampling of hard-to-find songs which Atkins co-wrote with Boudleaux Bryant. The biographical essay was written by country music historian Rich Kienzle, known for his expertise on the subject of country guitar.

In 2004, Bear Family released another box set of 214 tracks titled Mr. Guitar: The Complete Recordings 1955-1960.

Professional ratings
Review scores
Source	Rating
Allmusic	4.5/5 stars

== Track listing ==
=== CD 1 ===
1. "Guitar Blues" (Atkins) – 2:50
2. "Brown Eyes Cryin' in the Rain" (Wally Fowler, Curley Kinsey) – 2:49
3. "Ain'tcha Tired of Makin' Me Blue" (Jenny Carson) – 2:45
4. "I'm Gonna Get Tight" (Jerry Irby) – 2:55
5. "Canned Heat" (Atkins) – 2:35
6. "Standing Room Only" (Cy Coben, Charles Grean) – 2:54
7. "Don't Hand Me That Line" (Maurice Kregal, Dallas Turner) – 2:37
8. "Bug Dance" (Atkins) – 2:57
9. "(I Know My Baby Loves Me) In Her Own Peculiar Way" (Don Canton, R. Shepard) – 2:27
10. "The Nashville Jump" (Atkins, Tennis) – 2:32
11. "My Guitar Is My Sweetheart" (Alfio Bargnesi, David Rhodes) – 2:40
12. "I'm Pickin' the Blues" (Atkins, Atkins) – 2:50
13. "Gone, Gone, Gone" (Atkins) – 2:40
14. "Barnyard Shuffle" (Atkins) – 2:52
15. "Save Your Money" (Atkins, Atkins) – 2:34
16. "(I May Be Color Blind But) I Know When I'm Blue" (Atkins) – 2:33
17. "I've Been Working on the Guitar" (Traditional) – 2:30
18. "Dizzy Strings" (Atkins) – 2:45
19. "Money, Marbles and Chalk" (Garner "Pop" Eckler) – 2:54
20. "Wednesday Night Waltz" (Spencer Williams) – 2:32
21. "Guitar Waltz" (Zeke Clements) – 3:04
22. "Tellin' My Troubles to My Old Guitar" (Don Weston) – 2:46
23. "Dance of the Golden Rod" (Merle Travis) – 2:41
24. "Galloping on the Guitar" (Atkins) – 2:29
25. "Barber Shop Rag" (Atkins) – 2:50
26. "Centipede Boogie" (Atkins) – 2:38

=== CD 2 ===
1. "Under the Hickory Nut Tree" (Carter, Carter, Cash) – 2:58
2. "I Was Bitten by the Same Bug Twice" (Carter) – 2:31
3. "One More Chance" (Rogers, Taylor) – 2:49
4. "The Old Buck Dance" (Atkins) – 2:27
5. "Boogie Man Boogie" (Atkins) – 2:49
6. "Main Street Breakdown" (Atkins) – 2:18
7. "Confusin'" (Innis) – 2:14
8. "Music in My Heart" (Carter) – 2:17
9. "Indian Love Call" (Rudolf Friml, Oscar Hammerstein, Otto Harbach) – 2:39
10. "Birth of the Blues" (Lew Brown, Buddy DeSylva, Ray Henderson) – 2:33
11. "Mountain Melody" (Atkins) – 2:10
12. "You're Always Brand New" (Hamblen) – 2:39
13. "My Crazy Heart" (Atkins, Carter) – 2:41
14. "Hybrid Corn" (Atkins) – 2:15
15. "Jitterbug Waltz" (Fats Waller) – 2:37
16. "One Man Boogie [Take H]" (Atkins) – 2:40
17. "Crazy Rhythm [instrumental]" (Caesar, Kahn, Meyer) – 2:25
18. "Crazy Rhythm [Vocal Version]" (Caesar, Kahn, Meyer) – 2:23
19. "Rustic Dance" (Unknown) – 2:06
20. "Rainbow" (Bryan, Wenrich) – 2:38
21. "In the Mood" (Garland, Razaf) – 2:29
22. "Spanish Fandango" (Traditional) – 2:40
23. "Midnight" (Atkins, Boudleaux Bryant) – 2:53 (Performed by:Atkins, Beasley Singers)
24. "Good-Bye Blues" (Fields, Johnson, McHugh) – 2:29 (Performed by: Atkins, Beasley Singers)
25. "Your Mean Little Heart" (Bryant) – 2:33 (Performed by: Atkins, Beasley Singers)
26. "Sweet Bunch of Daisies" (Atkins, Bryant) – 2:05 (Performed by: Atkins, Beasley Singers)
27. "Blue Gypsy" (Atkins, Bryant) – 2:19
28. "Third Man Theme" (Anton Karas) – 2:26
29. "One Man Boogie [Take D]" (Atkins) – 2:38

=== CD 3 ===
1. "St. Louis Blues" (W. C. Handy) – 2:17
2. "Nobody's Sweetheart" (Ernie Erdman, Gus Kahn, Billy Meyers, E. Schoebel) – 2:16
3. "Lover, Come Back to Me" (Oscar Hammerstein, Sigmund Romberg) – 2:26
4. "Stephen Foster Medley" (Traditional) – 2:26
5. "Hangover Blues" (Atkins, Bryant) – 2:36
6. "Imagination" (Atkins) – 2:13
7. "Black Mountain Rag" (Traditional) – 2:18
8. "Guitar Polka" (Unknown) – 2:06 (Performed by: Atkins, Rosalie Allen)
9. "Dream Train" (Unknown) – 2:13 (Performed by: Atkins, Rosalie Allen)
10. "Meet Mister Callaghan" (Eric Spear) – 2:42
11. "Chinatown, My Chinatown" (Jerome, Schwartz) – 2:01
12. "High Rockin' Swing" (Avants, Tennant) – 2:20
13. "Pig Leaf Rag" (Atkins, Bryant) – 2:31
14. "Oh by Jingo!" (Lew Brown, Albert Von Tilzer) – 2:14
15. "Hello Ma Baby" (Joseph Howard, Ida Emerson) – 2:09
16. "The Bells of St. Mary's" (Adams, Furber) – 2:15
17. "Country Gentleman" (Atkins, Bryant) – 2:15
18. "The Memphis Blues" (W. C. Handy, George Norton) – 2:11
19. "Alice Blue Gown" (Joseph McCarthy, Harry Tierney) – 2:06
20. "12th Street Rag" (Bowman) – 2:22
21. "Peeping Tom" (Atkins, Bryant) – 2:22
22. "Three O'Clock in the Morning" (Robledo, Terriss) – 2:19
23. "Georgia Camp Meeting" (Traditional) – 2:14
24. "City Slicker" (Atkins) – 2:23
25. "Dill Pickle Rag" (Traditional) – 2:25
26. "Rubber Doll Rag" (Landress) – 2:15
27. "Beautiful Ohio [Version 1]" (Earl, MacDonald) – 2:17
28. "Kentucky Derby" (Atkins, Bryant) – 2:03
29. "Wildwood Flower" (Carter) – 2:13
30. "Guitars on Parade" (Atkins) – 2:22
31. "Simple Simon" (Atkins) – 2:11
32. "Rubber Doll Rag [alternate take]" (Landress) – 2:24

=== CD 4 ===
1. "Get Up and Go" (McCarthy) – 2:54
2. "Pagan Love Song" (Brown, Freed) – 2:07
3. "Beautiful Ohio [Version 2]" (Earl, MacDonald) – 2:09
4. "Downhill Drag" (Atkins, Bryant) – 2:23
5. "Avalon" (Buddy DeSylva, Al Jolson, Vincent Rose) – 2:20
6. "Sunrise Serenade" (Brown, Carle) – 2:45
7. "San Antonio Rose" (Bob Wills) – 2:29
8. "Set a Spell" (Atkins, Innis) – 2:27 (Performed by: Atkins, Red Kirk)
9. "Mister Misery [version]" (Atkins, Innis) – 2:29 (Performed by: Atkins, Louis Innis)
10. "Get Up and Go" (McCarthy) – 2:53 (Performed by: Atkins, Red Kirk)
11. "South" (Ray Charles, T. Hayes, Bennie Moten) – 2:49
12. "Alabama Jubilee" (George L. Cobb, Jack Yellen) – 2:36
13. "Corrine, Corrina" (Chatmon, Mitchell Parish, J. Mayo Williams) – 2:20
14. "(Back Home Again in) Indiana" (James F. Hanley, Ballard MacDonald) – 3:22
15. "Red Wing" (Mills) – 2:27
16. "Frankie and Johnnie" (Traditional) – 2:35
17. "A Gay Ranchero" (J. J. Espinosa, Francia Luban) – 2:34 (Performed by: Tuvinian Singers)
18. "Ballin' the Jack" (Burris, Smith) – 2:58
19. "Honeysuckle Rose" (Andy Razaf, Fats Waller) – 2:42
20. "Darktown Strutters' Ball" (Brooks) – 2:01 (Performed by: Atkins, Hank Snow)
21. "The Old Spinning Wheel" (Hill) – 2:27 (Performed by: Atkins, Hank Snow)
22. "Silver Bell" (Madden, Wenrich) – 2:17 ( Performed by: Atkins, Hank Snow)
23. "Under the Double Eagle" (Josef Wagner) – 2:35 (Performed by: Atkins, Hank Snow)
24. "Birth of the Blues" (Lew Brown, Buddy DeSylva, Ray Henderson) – 3:23
25. "Have You Ever Been Lonely (Have You Ever Been Blue)" (Brown, DeRose) – 2:43
26. "Caravan" (Duke Ellington, Irving Mills, Juan Tizol) – 3:28
27. "Ol' Man River" (Oscar Hammerstein II, Jerome Kern) – 2:35
28. "Mister Sandman" (Pat Ballard) – 2:17
29. "New Spanish Two Step" (Tommy Duncan, Bob Wills) – 2:09

== Personnel ==
- Chet Atkins - guitar, vocals
- James “Jimmy” Atkins - guitar
- George Barnes - guitar
- Harold Bradley - guitar
- Jerry Byrd - lap steel guitar
- Bob Moore - bass
- Buddy Harman - drums
- Hank Snow - guitar, vocals
- Anita Carter - bass, vocals
- Rosalie Allen - vocals
- Frank Carroll - bass
- Al Chernet - guitar
- Charles Grean - bass
- Ray Edenton - guitar
- John Gordy - piano
- Marty Gold - piano, organ
- Marvin Hughes - piano, organ, celeste
- Dale Potter - fiddle
- Ernie Newton - bass
- Donna Wilson - vocals
- Coleen Wilson - vocals
- Jack Shook - guitar, vocals
- Donald Slayman - fiddle
- Harold Siegel - bass
- Roy Lanham - guitar
- Phil Kraus - bass
- Dutch McMillin - clarinet
- Anita Kerr - organ
- Louis Innis - guitar

== See also ==
- The Nashville A-Team
