= Go-Round =

Studio album by Jeff Coffin Mu'tet
- Released: September 11, 2001
- Recorded: Peacock Gardens, Nashville, Tennessee
- Genre: Jazz
- Length: 67:46
- Label: Compass Records
- Producer: Jeff Coffin

Jeff Coffin Mu'tet chronology
Commonality (1999)	Go-Round (2001)	Bloom (2005)

Professional ratings
Review scores
Source	Rating
Allmusic	link

Go-Round was the third album released by Jeff Coffin, released in 2001. This album was the first album recorded and released with the Mu'tet, a constantly changing group of guest musicians that play with Coffin.

== Track listing ==
1. "Intro/Tuesday's Waterloo" – 7:41
2. "Walking on Thin Water" – 5:04
3. "Go-Round" – 6:04
4. "Zuleikha" – 4:50
5. "Tall and Lanky" – 6:53
6. "As in the Beginning..." – 2:26
7. "Playin' the Worm" – 4:59
8. "Only Love" – 5:51
9. "Multa et Mira" – 5:17
10. "Dewey" – 12:26
11. "Ibrahim" – 6:12

== Personnel ==
- Jeff Coffin – saxophone, flute, clarinet, bass clarinet
- Noa Ben-Amotz – spoken vocals
- Chris Walters – accordion, piano
- Derek Jones – acoustic bass
- Tom Giampietro – drums, percussion
