= Jazz from the Hills =

Jazz From the Hills

Studio album by Chet Atkins, The Country All-Stars
- Released: 1953 (String Dustin'), Jun 28, 1994 (re-issue)
- Genre: Pop, jazz
- Label: RCA Victor (String Dustin') PM-3167,
- Producer: Steve Sholes, Chet Atkins

Chet Atkins chronology
Galloping Guitar: The Early Years (1993)	Jazz From the Hills (1953)	Read My Licks (1994)

Alternative Cover
- Alternative cover of Jazz From the Hills

Jazz From the Hills is an album by American guitarist Chet Atkins and The Country All-Stars. It is a reissue of sessions from 1952 to 1956.

== History ==
Atkins formed a number of studio bands as his leadership in the RCA studios of Nashville began to take shape in the early 1950s. Built on the nucleus of Atkins and Homer & Jethro (who played on many of his early recordings), the Country All-Stars included other session musicians depending on who was available. Jerry Byrd, who for two years played duets with Chet on the WSM radio show "Two Guitars", recalls that they recorded between sessions. "It was another way to make $41.00! That was the session scale back then."

The first All-Stars recordings began in 1952 in Nashville with Atkins, Homer & Jethro, Jerry Byrd and bassist Ernie Newton. The second session included bassist Charles Grean and fiddler Dale Potter. In 1953 the All Stars found themselves at a session in New York and found time to record again. A Chicago session, minus Atkins, was recorded in 1953 with Homer & Jethro, Rulle, Rubenstein and Frigo. Another New York session in 1956 included Atkins, Homer & Jethro, Grean, Davis, Goldberg and George Barnes. The songs from that session were never released until Jazz From the Hills.

In later interviews, Atkins was critical of his playing in the sessions. He stated: "I was real ignorant musically in those days, and just played with a lot of fire because I didn't know any better."

Originally released in 1953 as a 10-inch vinyl record titled String Dustin', the record showcased Atkins, Henry "Homer" Haynes, Ken "Jethro" Burns, Jerry Byrd and Dale Potter playing older pop and jazz material. The record, as with all All Star recordings, received little promotion from RCA.

The reissue includes the original vinyl record release plus additional tracks that include the 1956 session with jazz guitarist George Barnes. (Barnes played rhythm guitar on the original demos Atkins did for RCA in 1947.) The extensive song-by-song liner notes are by music historian and journalist Rich Kienzle, based on new interviews with Atkins, Byrd, Jethro Burns and Dale Potter. A detailed discography is included.

== Track listing ==
Original 10–inch vinyl release track listing, released as String Dustin':

=== Side one ===
1. "Marie" (Berlin) – 2:38
2. "In a Little Spanish Town" (Lewis, Young, Wayne) – 2:47
3. "When It's Darkness on the Delta" (Levinson, Symes, Neiburg) – 2:46
4. "Sweet Georgia Brown" (Bernie, Casey, Pinkard) – 3:01

=== Side two ===
1. "The Lady in Red" (Dixon, Wrubel) – 2:03
2. "Stompin' at the Savoy" (Sampson, Goodman, Webb) – 2:48
3. "Midnight Train" (Atkins, Burns) – 2:42
4. "Indiana March" (composer unknown) – 2:38

CD Track Listing: (Bear Family (BCD–15728AH) release Jazz From the Hills)

1. "Stompin' at the Savoy" (Sampson, Goodman, Webb) – 2:48
2. "Tennessee Rag" (Atkins) – 2:26
3. "Do Something" (Green, Stept) – 2:37 (Homer Haynes – vocals)
4. "My Little Girl" (Van Tilzer, Lewis, Dillon) – 2:21
5. "It Goes Like This (That Funny Melody)" (Caesar, Friend) – 2:25 (Jethro Burns – vocals)
6. "Midnight Train" (Atkins, Burns) – 2:42
7. "What's the Reason (I'm Not Pleasin' You) (Pee, Grier, Tomlin, Hatch) – 2:20 (Homer Haynes – vocals)
8. "Marie" (Berlin) – 2:38
9. "Fiddle Patch" (Potter) – 2:20
10. "Fiddle Sticks" (Potter) – 2:06
11. "In a Little Spanish Town" (Lewis, Young, Wayne) – 2:47
12. "Sweet Georgia Brown" (Bernie, Casey, Pinkard) – 3:01
13. "The Lady in Red" (Dixon, Wrubel) – 2:03
14. "When It's Darkness on the Delta" (Levinson, Symes, Neiberg) – 2:46
15. "Indiana March (master)" (composer unknown) – 2:38
16. "The Vacation Train" (Smith, Korsen) – 2:14
17. "Indiana March (take 1)" (composer unknown) – 2:34
18. "Song of the Wanderer (Where Shall I Go)" (Moret) – 2:15
19. "Royal Garden Blues (master)" (Williams, Williams) – 2:22
20. "I'll See You in My Dreams" (Jones, Kahn) – 2:44
21. "Royal Garden Blues (take 1)" (Williams, Williams) – 2:16

== Personnel ==
- Chet Atkins – guitar (except "Vacation Train")
- Homer Haynes – guitar, vocals
- George Barnes – guitar (on "Song of the Wanderer", "Royal Garden Blues", "I'll See You in My Dreams")
- Jethro Burns – mandolin, vocals, guitar on "Vacation Train"
- Jerry Byrd – lap steel, vocals
- Dale Potter – fiddle
- Bob Davis – piano
- Marty Rubenstein – piano
- Charles Grean – bass
- Johnny Frigo – bass
- Ernie Newton – bass
- Irving Goldberg – drums
- Frank Rulle – drums
