= Nobody Love, Nobody Gets Hurt =

Studio album by Suzy Bogguss
- Released: June 2, 1998
- Studio: The Tracking Room, Emerald Sound Studios, Love Shack Studios and The Money Pit (Nashville, Tennessee)
- Genre: Country
- Length: 39:32
- Label: Capitol Nashville
- Producer: Suzy Bogguss Doug Crider

Suzy Bogguss chronology
Give Me Some Wheels (1996)	Nobody Love, Nobody Gets Hurt (1998)	Suzy Bogguss (1999)

Nobody Love, Nobody Gets Hurt is the eighth studio album by American country music singer Suzy Bogguss. It was released in 1998 as her final album for Capitol Records.

== Content ==
The album includes the singles "Somebody to Love", "Nobody Love, Nobody Gets Hurt", and "From Where I Stand".

== Critical reception ==
Jana Pendragon of Allmusic rated the album 2.5 stars out of 5, saying that she "runs the gamut as far as the material she elected to use on this project is concerned, from great tunes by Cheryl Wheeler, Bobbie Cryner, and Julie Miller to run-of-the mill country-pop songs". Stephen L. Betts of Country Standard Time praised the title track, as well as the presence of Garth Brooks, Patty Loveless, Trisha Yearwood, Kathy Mattea, and Alison Krauss on backing vocals, saying, "Bogguss' graciousiness in letting others share the spotlight typifies the spirit the album conveys, but it's her own considerable gift for interpretation that draws the listener in subtly, as she weaves bits of magic within each and every track."

== Track listing ==
No.	Title	Writer(s)	Length
1.	"Just Enough Rope"	Michael Lunn, Michael Noble	4:26
2.	"When I Run"	Skip Ewing	3:54
3.	"I Wish Hearts Would Break"	Tony Arata	3:42
4.	"Nobody Love, Nobody Gets Hurt"	Bobbie Cryner	3:05
5.	"Family Tree"	Doug Crider, Matt Rollings	2:47
6.	"Somebody to Love"	Suzy Bogguss, Matraca Berg, Crider	3:26
7.	"Moonlight and Roses"	Cheryl Wheeler	3:15
8.	"Take Me Back"	Julie Miller	4:06
9.	"From Where I Stand"	Kim Richey, Tia Sillers	3:02
10.	"I Surrender"	Bogguss, Crider	4:03
11.	"Train of Thought"	Cathy Majeski, Sunny Russ, Stephony Smith	3:46

== Personnel ==
Compiled from liner notes.

Musicians

- Suzy Bogguss – vocals
- Matt Rollings – acoustic piano, synthesizers
- Howard Duck – Hammond B3 organ
- Brent Rowan – acoustic guitars, electric guitars
- Darrell Scott – acoustic guitars, Weissenborn slide guitar, dobro, mandolin
- Dan Dugmore – electric guitars (8), steel guitar (8)
- Leland Sklar – bass
- Carlos Vega – drums, percussion
- Waldo LaTowsky – percussion
- Hank Singer – fiddle (1, 8)
- Alison Krauss – viola (7)
- Pat Bergeson – harmonica (11)

Background vocalists

- Suzy Bogguss – backing vocals (1)
- Gerald Boyd – backing vocals (1, 5, 6, 10)
- Harry Stinson – backing vocals (1, 5, 6)
- Doug Crider – backing vocals (2)
- Kathy Mattea – backing vocals (2)
- Darrell Scott – backing vocals (3)
- Denny Dadmun-Bixby – backing vocals (6, 9)
- Garth Brooks – backing vocals (8)
- Howard Duck – backing vocals (9)
- Patty Loveless – backing vocals (10)
- Alison Krauss – backing vocals (11)
- Trisha Yearwood – backing vocals (11)

=== Production ===
- Suzy Bogguss – producer
- Doug Crider – producer
- Ed Seay – recording, mixing
- Russ Martin – overdub recording
- Dean Jamison – recording assistant, mix assistant
- Rob MacMillan – overdub assistant
- Glenn Meadows – mastering at Masterfonics (Nashville, Tennessee)
- Denise Jarvis – production assistant
- Carlton Davis – art production
- Virginia Team – art direction
- Chris Ferrera – design
- Robert Ascroft – photography
- Earl Cox – hair
- Mary Beth Felts – make-up
- Claudia Fowler – stylist
- Phillip Kovac – management for The Left Bank Organization

== Chart performance ==
=== Album ===
Chart (1998)	Peak position
U.S. Billboard Top Country Albums	42

=== Singles ===
Year	Single	Peak positions	
Year	Single	US Country	CAN Country
1998	"Somebody to Love"	33	18
1998	"Nobody Love, Nobody Gets Hurt"	63	80
1998	"From Where I Stand"	67	91
