= Somebody to Love (Suzy Bogguss song) =

Single by Suzy Bogguss

from the album Nobody Love, Nobody Gets Hurt
- B-side: "I Surrender"
- Released: April 11, 1998
- Genre: Country
- Length: 3:24
- Label: Capitol Nashville
- Songwriters: Suzy Bogguss, Matraca Berg, Doug Crider
- Producers: Doug Crider, Suzy Bogguss

Suzy Bogguss singles chronology
| "She Said, He Heard" (1997) | "Somebody to Love" (1998) | "Nobody Love, Nobody Gets Hurt" (1998) |

"Somebody to Love" is a song co-written and recorded by American country music artist Suzy Bogguss. It was released in April 1998 as the first single from the album Nobody Love, Nobody Gets Hurt. The song spent 19 weeks on the Billboard Hot Country Singles & Tracks chart, peaking at number 33 during the week of July 4, 1998. It was written by Bogguss, Matraca Berg and Doug Crider.

== Chart performance ==
| Chart (1998) | Peak position |
|---|---|
| Canada Country Singles (RPM) | 18 |
| US Hot Country Songs (Billboard) | 33 |
| US Country National Airplay (Radio & Records) | 23 |
