= Aces (song) =

Single by Suzy Bogguss

from the album Aces
- B-side: "Hopelessly Yours"
- Released: March 1992
- Genre: Country
- Length: 3:49
- Label: Liberty
- Songwriter: Cheryl Wheeler
- Producers: Suzy Bogguss; Jimmy Bowen

Suzy Bogguss singles chronology
| "Outbound Plane" (1991) | "Aces" (1992) | "Letting Go" (1992) |

"Aces" is a song written by Cheryl Wheeler, and recorded by American country music artist Suzy Bogguss. It was released in March 1992 as the third single and title track from her album Aces. The song reached number 9 on the Billboard Hot Country Singles & Tracks chart in July 1992. Wheeler herself previously recorded the song on her 1990 album Circles and Arrows.

== Chart performance ==
| Chart (1992) | Peak position |
|---|---|
| Canada Country Singles (RPM) | 6 |
| US Hot Country Songs (Billboard) | 9 |
| US Country National Airplay (Radio & Records) | 7 |

=== Year-end charts ===
| Chart (1992) | Position |
|---|---|
| Canada Country Tracks (RPM) | 92 |
| US Hot Country Singles (Billboard) | 71 |
