= Commonality (album) =

Studio album by Jeff Coffin
- Released: August 17, 1999
- Genre: Avant-garde
- Length: 67:47
- Label: Compass Records
- Producer: Jeff Coffin

Jeff Coffin chronology
Outside The Lines (1997)	Commonality (1999)	Go-Round (2001)

Professional ratings
Review scores
Source	Rating
Allmusic	4/5 stars

Commonality was the second album released by Jeff Coffin, released in 1999. This album was the first and, so far, only album released by Coffin as a solo artist. His previous album being under the name Jeff Coffin Ensemble and subsequent albums recorded and released by the Jeff Coffin Mu'tet.

== Track listing ==
All tracks by Jeff Coffin

1. "First Comes Last" – 5:17
2. "Salt Lick" – 4:51
3. "Commonality" – 9:47
4. "Espoo You" – 7:38
5. "Angle Of Repose" – 10:39
6. "Something Quick" – 10:42
7. "Outside, The Gray Sky Cries" – 6:18
8. "Who's Who" – 7:47
9. "Prayer" – 4:45

== Personnel ==
- Jeff Coffin - alto & tenor saxophones
- Rod McGaha - trumpet
- Chris Enghauser - acoustic bass
- Tom Giampietro - drums
