= Just Like the Weather =

Single by Suzy Bogguss

from the album Something Up My Sleeve
- B-side: "No Green Eyes"
- Released: July 1993
- Genre: Country
- Length: 3:17
- Label: Liberty
- Songwriters: Suzy Bogguss; Doug Crider
- Producers: Suzy Bogguss; Jimmy Bowen

Suzy Bogguss singles chronology
"Heartache" (1993)	"Just Like the Weather" (1993)	"Hey Cinderella" (1993)

"Just Like the Weather" is a song co-written and recorded by American country music artist Suzy Bogguss. It was released in July 1993 as the first single from her album Something Up My Sleeve. The song reached number 5 on the Billboard Hot Country Singles & Tracks chart in November 1993. It was written by Bogguss and Doug Crider.

== Chart performance ==
Chart (1993)	Peak position
Canada Country Singles (RPM)	5
US Hot Country Songs (Billboard)	5
US Country National Airplay (Radio & Records)	5

=== Year-end charts ===
Chart (1993)	Position
Canada Country Tracks (RPM)	86
US Country Songs (Billboard)	57
