= Moment of Truth (Suzy Bogguss album) =

Studio album by Suzy Bogguss
- Released: August 21, 1990
- Studio: Emerald Sound Studios (Nashville, Tennessee)
- Genre: Country (new traditionalist)
- Length: 34:17
- Label: Liberty
- Producer: Suzy Bogguss; Jimmy Bowen

Suzy Bogguss chronology
Somewhere Between (1989)	Moment of Truth (1990)	Aces (1991)

Alternative cover
- Alternative cover/title for British market.

Professional ratings
Review scores
Source	Rating
AllMusic	3/5 stars
Entertainment Weekly	B+

Moment of Truth is the second studio album by the American country music artist Suzy Bogguss, released on August 2, 1990, by Liberty Records. The album was preceded by the singles "Under the Gun" and "All Things Made New Again", both of which charted in at No. 72 on the Hot Country Songs chart in the United States. Bogguss produced the album with Jimmy Bowen.

== Track listing ==
1. "Under the Gun" (Hugh Prestwood) – 3:02
2. "My Side of the Story" (Suzy Bogguss, Doug Crider) – 3:26
3. "Moment of Truth" (Steve Bogard, Rick Giles) – 3:25
4. "All Things Made New Again" (Dan Seals, Rafe Van Hoy) – 2:44
5. "Wild Horses" (Kye Fleming, Verlon Thompson) – 2:47
6. "Fear of Flying" (Bogguss, Gary Scruggs) – 3:46
7. "As If I Didn't Know" (Hal Bynum, Mel Tillis) – 3:24
8. "Blue Days" (Hillary Kanter, Even Stevens) – 3:33
9. "Burning Down" (Red Lane, Madeline Stone) – 3:54
10. "Friend of Mine" (Bogguss, Franne Golde, Wendy Waldman) – 3:45

== Personnel ==
- Suzy Bogguss – vocals, backing vocals
- Matt Rollings – acoustic piano
- Barry Tashian – squeezebox
- Steve Gibson – acoustic guitars, electric guitars
- Dann Huff – electric guitars
- Verlon Thompson – acoustic guitars
- Mike Auldridge – dobro
- Larry Sasser – steel guitar
- Glenn Worf – bass
- Rick Marotta – drums
- Terry McMillan – percussion
- Rob Hajacos – fiddle
- Doug Crider – backing vocals
- Dan Seals – backing vocals
- Harry Stinson – backing vocals
- Lonnie Wilson – backing vocals

== Production ==
- Suzy Bogguss – producer
- Jimmy Bowen – producer
- Russ Martin – recording, overdub recording
- Bob Bullock – overdub recording, mixing
- Tim Kish – overdub recording
- Julian King – recording assistant, overdub assistant, mix assistant
- Jim DeMain – overdub assistant
- Marty Williams – mix assistant
- Milan Bogdan – digital editing
- Glenn Meadows – mastering at Masterfonics (Nashville, Tennessee)
- Jeff Danley – drum technician
- Ray Pillow – song selection assistance
- Virginia Team – art direction
- Jerry Joyner – design
- Peter Darley Miller – photography
- EMI Music Dist. – distributor

== Charts ==
Singles - Billboard (North America)

Year	Single	Chart	Position
1990	"Under the Gun"	Hot Country Songs	72
1990	"All Things Made New Again"	Hot Country Songs	72

== Release details ==
Country	Date	Label	Format	Catalog
US	1990	Liberty	CD	C2-92653
			CS	C4-92653
UK	2001	EMI Gold	CD	856038
