= Aces (album) =

Studio album by Suzy Bogguss
- Released: August 27, 1991
- Recorded: May 1991
- Studio: Emerald Sound Studios, Sound Stage Studios and Masterfonics (Nashville, Tennessee)
- Genre: Neotraditional Country
- Length: 35:09
- Label: Liberty
- Producer: Suzy Bogguss Jimmy Bowen

Suzy Bogguss chronology
| Moment of Truth (1990) | Aces (1991) | Voices in the Wind (1992) |

Singles from Aces
- 1. "Someday Soon" Released: September 4, 1991; 2. "Outbound Plane" Released: December 1991; 3. "Aces" Released: March 1992; 4. "Letting Go" Released: July 1992

Aces is the third studio album by the American country music singer-songwriter Suzy Bogguss, released on August 27, 1991, through Liberty Records. The album spawned three Top 10 hits on the country charts – "Outbound Plane," "Aces" and "Letting Go" .

Aces is Bogguss's highest-charting album and has gone on to earn an RIAA Platinum certification and was nominated for the 1992 CMA "Horizon Award". Following the success of Aces, the Country Music Association recognized Bogguss' achievements in 1992 by giving her its Horizon Award, which is awarded annually to the artist who has demonstrated the most significant creative growth and development.

"Still Hold On" was originally recorded by Kim Carnes on her 1981 album, Mistaken Identity.

== Promotional videos ==
Two music videos were made to promote the album: "Outbound Plane" and "Letting Go". Both were directed by Deaton-Flanigen. The story of "Outbound Plane" depicts life in a deserted airport featuring Bogguss and her lover as central characters, and "Letting Go" tells the story of a mother remembering her daughter from her early years until she leaves for college.

== Track listing ==
| No. | Title | Writer(s) | Length |
|---|---|---|---|
| 1. | "Outbound Plane" | Nanci Griffith, Tom Russell | 2:52 |
| 2. | "Aces" | Cheryl Wheeler | 3:49 |
| 3. | "Someday Soon" | Ian Tyson | 3:55 |
| 4. | "Let Goodbye Hurt" | Ellen Crandell | 3:15 |
| 5. | "Save Yourself" | Beth Nielsen Chapman | 2:54 |
| 6. | "Yellow River Road" | Suzy Bogguss, Doug Crider | 2:59 |
| 7. | "Part of Me" | Tony Arata | 3:20 |
| 8. | "Letting Go" | Crider, Matt Rollings | 4:33 |
| 9. | "Music on the Wind" | Andy Byrd, Victoria Shaw, Jana Stanfield | 3:25 |
| 10. | "Still Hold On" | Kim Carnes, Dave Ellingson, Eric Kaz, Wendy Waldman | 4:07 |
| Total length: | | | 35:09 |

== Reception ==
Professional ratings
Review scores
| Source | Rating |
|---|---|
| Allmusic | 4.5/5 stars |
| Entertainment Weekly | B+ |

Alanna Nash of Entertainment Weekly wrote that Aces "challenges the conceit of the stereotypical passive country female, willing to put up with all manner of cantankerous behavior to hold on to a man." She also said that "In one gutsy song after another, Bogguss — whose clear soprano rings without artifice — takes no guff, emerging as a woman and singer of substance.." Bryan Buss of Allmusic stated that Bogguss' "appealing girl-next-door approach, her choice to straddle the fence between contemporary and traditional C&W and her perfectly pitched voice are what helped [Aces] be the catalyst for making her a household name among country music fans."

== Personnel ==
- Suzy Bogguss – lead vocals, backing vocals (9)
- Johnny Neel – keyboards (1), organ (5, 10), Wurlitzer electric piano (6)
- Matt Rollings – acoustic piano (1–5, 7–10)
- John Barlow Jarvis – keyboards (8)
- Joey Miskulin – accordion (9)
- Brent Rowan – acoustic guitars, electric guitars
- Gerald Alan Boyd – acoustic lead guitar (2), backing vocals (6)
- Richard Bennett – electric guitar (9), tiple (9), Del Vecchio guitar (9), Danelectro (9)
- Tommy Spurlock – steel guitar (2, 3)
- Paul Franklin – steel guitar (4)
- Mark O'Connor – mandolin (3)
- Sam Bush – mandolin (6, 10)
- Leland Sklar – bass
- Eddie Bayers – drums
- Tom Roady – percussion (1, 3, 5, 6, 8–10)
- The "Gay Caballeros" – handclaps (9)
- Danny Parks – fiddle (3)
- Kirk "Jellyroll" Johnson – harmonica (6, 10)
- David Campbell – string arrangements and conductor (4, 7, 9)
- Sid Page – concertmaster (4, 7, 9), string arrangements and conductor (8)
- Beth Nielsen Chapman – backing vocals (1, 5)
- Harry Stinson – backing vocals (1, 2, 5, 9, 10)
- Karen Staley – backing vocals (5)
- Rick Yord – backing vocals (6)
- Victoria Shaw – backing vocals (9)
- Jana Stanfield – backing vocals (9)
- Vince Gill – backing vocals (9, 10)

=== Production ===
- Suzy Bogguss – producer
- Jimmy Bowen – producer
- John Guess – recording, mixing
- Bob Bullock – overdub recording
- Tim Kish – overdub recording
- Russ Martin – overdub recording
- Marty Williams – overdub recording, recording assistant
- Milan Bogdan – digital editing
- Glenn Meadows – mastering
- Janie West – song selection assistant
- Virginia Team – art direction
- Jerry Joyner – design
- Peter Darley Miller – photography
- Robert Davis – hair
- Mary Beth Felts – make-up
- Vanessa Ware – stylist

== Chart performance ==
=== Album ===
| Chart (1991) | Peak position |
|---|---|
| U.S. Billboard Top Country Albums | 15 |
| U.S. Billboard 200 | 83 |
| Canadian RPM Country Albums | 21 |

=== Year-end charts ===
| Chart (1992) | Position |
|---|---|
| US Top Country Albums (Billboard) | 23 |

=== Singles ===
| Year | Single | Peak positions | |
| Year | Single | US Country | CAN Country |
|---|---|---|---|
| 1991 | "Someday Soon" | 12 | 16 |
| 1991 | "Outbound Plane" | 9 | 9 |
| 1992 | "Aces" | 9 | 6 |
| 1992 | "Letting Go" | 6 | 9 |

== Certifications ==
RIAA Certification

| Cert. Date | Country | Award |
|---|---|---|
| 9/14/92 | USA | Gold |
| 2/17/95 | USA | Platinum |

== Release details ==
| Country | Date | Label | Format | Catalog |
|---|---|---|---|---|
| US | 1991 | Liberty | CD | C2-95874 |
| | | | CS | C4-95874 |
