= Someday Soon (Ian Tyson song) =

1963 single

"You Were on My Mind"/ "Some Day Soon"

Single by Ian & Sylvia

from the album Northern Journey
- A-side: "You Were on My Mind"
- B-side: "Some Day Soon"
- Released: January 1964
- Recorded: 1963
- Studio: Vanguard Records Studio (Manhattan)
- Genre: contemporary folk music
- Length: "Some Day Soon": 2:00
- Label: Vanguard Records
- Songwriter: "Some Day Soon": Ian Tyson

Ian & Sylvia singles chronology
"Four Strong Winds" (1963)	"You Were on My Mind"/ "Some Day Soon" (1964)	"Four Rode By"/ "Nova Scotia Farewell" (1964)

The theme of "Someday Soon"
"One of the classic tales that depicts the relationship between the cowboy & a woman emerges in the lyrical narrative of...Ian Tyson's 'Someday Soon' [which,] from the perspective of the rodeo cowboy's female lover,...recounts the strong pull that the rodeo holds on the young man who 'loves his damned old rodeos as much as he loves' her. Thus, adhering to his cowboy code, this rodeo man is indeed a stereotypical wandering cowboy, following his passion for horses & the nomadic lifestyle. As the song protagonist continually admits that she will be going with him 'someday soon,' it is clear from the narrative that this young lady may be waiting a very long time".

"Someday Soon" is a song composed by Canadian singer-songwriter Ian Tyson who recorded the song with Sylvia Fricker as the duo Ian & Sylvia in 1963. Cited by Richie Unterberger of Allmusic as "clearly point[ing] toward [its writer's] future C&W/cowboy direction", "Someday Soon" would be brought to prominence via a 1968 recording by Judy Collins, and subsequently recorded by a number of artists primarily in the country and western field. In 2010 "Someday Soon" was honored by the Western Writers of America as one of the "Top 100 Western Songs" of all time.

== As recorded by Ian & Sylvia/ Ian Tyson ==
On the occasion of his 2019 induction into the Canadian Songwriters Hall of Fame, Ian Tyson would credit Bob Dylan with inspiring Ian & Sylvia to follow his lead in writing "original folk songs":(Ian Tyson quote:)"We had to go in some direction, because we had used up all the real roots music from the Delta on north. Bob blazed the trail into the wilderness, into unknown territory. I realized after I had written 'Four Strong Winds' - Tyson's tyro composition written in 1962 after first hearing Dylan sing an original song - "and a couple of others, I had all kinds of cowboy material back there from personal experience. I just never thought of it as folk material, which it was of course."

Like the subject of "Someday Soon", Tyson had been a rodeo rider in his youth, an on-the-job injury ending Tyson's career in his mid-20s (that injury led to Tyson's interest in music: while hospitalized he learned to play the guitar to pass the time). Tyson had written the song at the Lower East Side apartment of Sylvia Fricker, his musical partner in Ian & Sylvia:(Ian Tyson quote:) "I don't know where I got the idea for [writing] a song from a girl's perspective. I stole the first line of ['Someday Soon'] from an old Stanley Brothers...bluegrass song. But I don't know where I got that plotline."

"Some Day Soon" - as the Ian & Sylvia version was originally styled - appeared on the 1964 Ian & Sylvia album Northern Journey, released shortly after the couple's June 1964 marriage: the song had already been issued as the B-side of the January 1964 advance single release "You Were on My Mind".

"Someday Soon" was recorded in 2001 by Ian Tyson for his 2002 live album release Live at Longview.

== As recorded by Judy Collins ==
"Someday Soon"

Single by Judy Collins

from the album Who Knows Where the Time Goes
- B-side: "My Father"
- Released: January 1969
- Genre: Folk rock, country pop
- Length: 3:43
- Label: Elektra #45649
- Songwriter: Ian Tyson
- Producer: David Anderle

Judy Collins singles chronology
"Both Sides Now" (1968)	"Someday Soon" (1969)	"Chelsea Morning" (1969)

=== Background ===
In 1968, Judy Collins recorded "Someday Soon" for her album Who Knows Where the Time Goes.

Although Collins had frequently crossed paths with Ian and Sylvia - (Judy Collins quote:) "We used to hang out together. I had heard all of their songs"- it was Collins' swain Stephen Stills who suggested she record "Someday Soon". According to the song's composer Ian Tyson(Ian Tyson quote:)"Stephen Stills was living with Judy Collins and he told her: 'You've got to record this song.' She didn't want to record it but he pushed her to and that recording was magical." Collins herself recalls responding positively to Stills' recommendation: (Judy Collins quote:) "One evening as Stephen and I were driving back [to Los Angeles] from Malibu we started talking about the [in progress sessions for] Who Knows Where the Time Goes. 'I think we need one more song,' Stephen said: 'What about 'Someday Soon'? The song was perfect for me, a Colorado girl at heart" - referencing the song's locale - "I remembered all the lyrics and we hit the freeway singing in harmony...The next day we recorded 'Someday Soon'" in a session which featured Stills on acoustic guitar, Buddy Emmons on pedal steel guitar and James Burton on a Telecaster electric guitar.

The album Who Knows Where the Time Goes was issued in the autumn of 1969, at which time "Both Sides Now" given a belated single release from Collins' 1967 album Wildflowers was affording Collins her debut Top 40 hit. As "Both Sides Now" was dropping out of the Top 40 from its #8 Billboard Hot 100 peak, "Someday Soon" was released as follow-up single in January 1969 - five years to the month after the release of the Ian & Sylvia single "You Were On My Mind"/ "Some Day Soon". Despite reaching the Top Ten in a number of locales where "Both Sides Now" had afforded Collins especial success - notably San Francisco and several mid-size California cities -, "Someday Soon" would rise no higher on the Hot 100 than #55, also reaching #37 on the Canadian Top Singles chart published by RPM. In 1972 "Someday Soon" was rereleased - with "Suzanne" as B-side - parallel with the release of the compilation Colors of the Day: The Best of Judy Collins album, but the single was not a success. Despite not being a major hit in terms of chart data, "Someday Soon" is considered a signature song of Collins'.

Robb Baker (The Chicago Tribune) reviewing Who Knows Where the Time Goes cited "Someday Soon" along with Collins' original "My Father" as the album's highlights, describing "Someday Soon" as "[Collins'] countriest selection ever...about a girl who vies for a man's affections with...a 'damned old rodeo'." Matthew Greenwald of Allmusic described Collins's rendition favorably, calling it "one of the great story-songs of the 1960s" and praising Collins's vocals.

In-concert renditions of "Someday Soon" appear on the 2000 album release Judy Collins Live at Wolf Trap and the 2003 multi-artist album release Wildflower Festival. Collins' 2015 duets album Strangers Again featured her rendition of "Someday Soon" with Jimmy Buffett.

=== Chart performance ===
Chart (1969)	Peak position
US Billboard Hot 100	55
Canadian RPM Top Singles	37

== Moe Bandy version ==
"Someday Soon"

Single by Moe Bandy

from the album Rodeo Romeo
- B-side: "She's Playin' Hard to Forget"
- Released: 1982
- Genre: Country
- Length: 3:09
- Label: Columbia #02735
- Songwriter: Ian Tyson
- Producer: Ray Baker

Moe Bandy singles chronology
"Rodeo Romeo" (1981)	"Someday Soon" (1982)	"She's Not Really Cheatin' (She's Just Gettin' Even)" (1982)

=== Background ===
In 1982, country music singer Moe Bandy remade the song for his Columbia Records album release Rodeo Romeo. It was the second and final single from that album. This version entered the country music charts in the U.S. and Canada, respectively reaching #21 and #36.

=== Chart performance ===
Chart (1982)	Peak position
US Hot Country Songs (Billboard)	21
Canadian RPM Country Tracks	36

== Suzy Bogguss version ==
"Someday Soon"

Single by Suzy Bogguss

from the album Aces
- B-side: "Fear of Flying"
- Released: September 4, 1991
- Genre: Country
- Length: 3:56
- Label: Liberty #44772
- Songwriter: Ian Tyson
- Producers: Suzy Bogguss; Jimmy Bowen

Suzy Bogguss singles chronology
"Hopelessly Yours" (1991)	"Someday Soon" (1991)	"Outbound Plane" (1992)

=== Background ===
Suzy Bogguss charted a recording of "Someday Soon" in 1991, from her Liberty Records album release Aces.

According to its composer Ian Tyson, Bogguss' recording of "Someday Soon" was due to steel guitarist Tommy Spurlock, Tyson's sometimes sideman, playing on the sessions for the Aces album:(Ian Tyson quote:) "He said; "Why don't y'all do 'Someday Soon', that old song of Tyson's?' They all gave him blank looks. Then they got the Judy Collins version of the song and cut it almost the same way with minor tweaking".

Suzy Bogguss on "Someday Soon"
"The lyrics seem so believable. It sounds like a true story about a girl whose life has been laid out for her in black and white. Then she meets this cowboy and everything turns to color."

Bogguss herself would state that "recording ['Someday Soon'] is sort of like living out a dream for me. I've been singing it forever:" "[It] was one of the first songs I played when I was starting out [performing] in 1978. [It's] a song that it felt cool to play with just the guitar, and I've always wanted to record it": "I actually had to fight to record that song [since Aces co-producer] Jimmy [Bowen] said: 'Too many people have covered that song. Moe Bandy did it 10 years ago and Judy Collins had a huge hit, and you’re going to draw comparisons.' I said, let me cut it because the young people [at her live shows] were really responding to it." Bogguss has conceded that while she aims to select songs that "I could give my twist to", "Someday Soon" was a number "I did pretty much like Judy Collins."

Released as the lead single from Aces, "Someday Soon" spent twenty weeks on the country singles charts and peaking at #12. The song also reached #16 on the RPM Country Tracks charts.

Bryan Buss of Allmusic described Bogguss's rendition as the "second strongest cut" on Aces, saying that her vocal performance "makes Bogguss an artist and not just a vocalist."

Bogguss' 2016 album Aces Redux features a new recording of "Someday Soon" (plus the other tracks from Aces). A 1999 live version of "Someday Soon" is featured on Live at Caffé Milano which had been sold in CD format at Bogguss' live shows since 2001 before being made available digitally in 2020.

=== Chart performance ===
Chart (1991)	Peak position
Canada Country Singles (RPM)	16
US Hot Country Songs (Billboard)	12
US Country National Airplay (Radio & Records)	9

== Other versions ==
"Someday Soon" has also been recorded by the Kingston Trio (album The Kingston Trio (Nick Bob John)/ 1964), Julie Felix (album The Second Album/ 1965), Esther & Abi Ofarim (album The New Esther & Abi Ofarim album/ 1966),Judy Lynn (album Judy Lynn Sings at Caesar's Palace/ 1969), Skeeter Davis (album "maryfrances"/ 1969), Lynn Anderson (album Stay There 'Til I Get There/ 1970), Johnny Cash (The Johnny Cash Show/October 7, 1970), Bonnie Dobson (album Bonnie Dobson/ 1972), Glen Campbell (album I Knew Jesus (Before He Was a Star)/ 1973), Chris LeDoux (album Rodeo Songs 'Old and New'/ 1973), Tanya Tucker (album Tanya Tucker/ 1975), Crystal Gayle (album When I Dream/ 1978), Freda & the Firedogs featuring Marcia Ball (album Live from the Old Soap Creek Saloon/ 1979), Reba McEntire (Live from Gilley's 4 August 1985) Mare Winningham (album Lonesomers/ 1997), Andrea Marcovicci (album Here There & Everywhere/ 2000), Lucy Kaplansky (album Over the Hills/ 2007), One Hundred Dollars (album Forest of Tears/ 2008), Joanie Keller (album Me & Dad/ 2009), Annalisa Tornfelt (album Search Zero/ 2015), Fred Eaglesmith & Tif Ginn (album Alive/ 2020), and Steve Forbert (album Early Morning Rain/ 2020).
