= Drive South =

Single by The Forester Sisters with The Bellamy Brothers

from the album Come Hold Me
- B-side: "You Can't Have a Good Time Without Me"
- Released: April 14, 1990
- Genre: Country
- Length: 4:02
- Label: Warner Bros. Nashville 19874
- Songwriter: John Hiatt
- Producer: Wendy Waldman

The Forester Sisters singles chronology
"Leave It Alone" (1989)	"Drive South" (1990)	"Nothing's Gonna Bother Me Tonight" (1990)

"Drive South" is a song written by John Hiatt, and recorded by him on his 1988 album Slow Turning. The song was later recorded by Kelly Willis on her 1990 debut album, Well Travelled Love. Neither versions were released as singles.

== The Forester Sisters version ==
In 1990, The Forester Sisters recorded the song with guest vocals from The Bellamy Brothers. This version appeared on the Forester Sisters' album Come Hold Me. It charted on both the Hot Country Singles & Tracks charts in the United States and the RPM Country Tracks charts in Canada.

=== Chart performance ===
Chart (1990)	Peak position
Canada Country Singles (RPM)	60
US Hot Country Songs (Billboard)	63

== Suzy Bogguss version ==
"Drive South"

Single by Suzy Bogguss

from the album Voices in the Wind
- B-side: "In the Day"
- Released: December 5, 1992
- Genre: Country
- Length: 3:10
- Label: Liberty 56786
- Songwriter: John Hiatt
- Producer: Suzy Bogguss; Jimmy Bowen

Suzy Bogguss singles chronology
"Letting Go" (1992)	"Drive South" (1992)	"Heartache" (1993)

In 1992, Suzy Bogguss recorded the song for her album Voices in the Wind, her first release on Liberty Records. The song served as the first single release from the album. It was Bogguss's highest-peaking single, reaching number 2 on the country music charts in early 1993 (having been blocked from #1 by Lorrie Morgan's "What Part of No"). It also reached number 94 on the UK pop chart in July 1993. Bogguss's version also had a music video, directed by Deaton-Flanigen Productions.

=== Chart performance ===
Chart (1992–1993)	Peak position
Canada Country Singles (RPM)	4
US Hot Country Songs (Billboard)	2
UK Singles (Official Charts)	94

=== Year-end charts ===
Chart (1993)	Position
Canada Country Tracks (RPM)	76
US Country Songs (Billboard)	49
