= Outbound Plane =

1988 song by Nanci Griffith

Single by Suzy Bogguss

from the album Aces
- B-side: "Yellow River Road"
- Released: December 1991
- Recorded: May 1991
- Genre: Country
- Length: 2:52
- Label: Liberty
- Songwriters: Nanci Griffith; Tom Russell
- Producers: Suzy Bogguss; Jimmy Bowen

Suzy Bogguss singles chronology
"Someday Soon" (1991)	"Outbound Plane" (1991)	"Aces" (1992)

"Outbound Plane" is a song written by American country music artists Nanci Griffith and Tom Russell. It was released on Griffith's 1988 album Little Love Affairs. Suzy Bogguss covered the song as the opening track and the second single from her 1991 album Aces. The song reached number 9 on the Billboard Hot Country Singles & Tracks chart in March 1992.

== Music video ==
The "Outbound Plane" music video was filmed on location at the aircraft boneyard of Davis–Monthan Air Force Base in Tucson, Arizona. The video depicts Bogguss and her lover as central characters dancing around in the boneyard. The video was directed by American team directors Deaton-Flanigen, consisting of Robert Deaton III and George Flanigen IV.

== Chart performance ==
Chart (1991–1992)	Peak position
Canada Country Singles (RPM)	9
US Hot Country Songs (Billboard)	9
US Country National Airplay (Radio & Records)	6

=== Year-end charts ===
Chart (1992)	Position
Canada Country Tracks (RPM)	85
