= Hey Cinderella =

Single by Suzy Bogguss

from the album Something Up My Sleeve
- B-side: "You'd Be the One"
- Released: November 1993
- Genre: Country
- Length: 4:04
- Label: Liberty
- Songwriters: Matraca Berg; Suzy Bogguss; Gary Harrison
- Producers: Suzy Bogguss; Jimmy Bowen

Suzy Bogguss singles chronology
"Just Like the Weather" (1993)	"Hey Cinderella" (1993)	"You Wouldn't Say That to a Stranger" (1994)

"Hey Cinderella" is a song co-written and recorded by American country music artist Suzy Bogguss. It was released in November 1993 as the second single from her album Something Up My Sleeve. The song reached number 5 on the Billboard Hot Country Singles & Tracks chart in February 1994. The single also entered the UK singles chart, reaching number 92 on September 25, 1993. It was written by Bogguss, Matraca Berg and Gary Harrison.

== Chart performance ==
Chart (1993–1994)	Peak position
Canada Country Singles (RPM)	2
US Hot Country Songs (Billboard)	5
US Country National Airplay (Radio & Records)	4
UK Singles (Official Charts)	92

=== Year-end charts ===
Chart (1994)	Position
Canada Country Tracks (RPM)	9
US Country Songs (Billboard)	66
