= Cross My Broken Heart (Suzy Bogguss song) =

Single by Suzy Bogguss

from the album Somewhere Between
- B-side: "Hopeless Romantic"
- Released: June 3, 1989
- Genre: Country
- Length: 3:54
- Label: Capitol Nashville
- Songwriters: Verlon Thompson, Kye Fleming
- Producer: Wendy Waldman

Suzy Bogguss singles chronology
"Somewhere Between" (1988)	"Cross My Broken Heart" (1989)	"My Sweet Love Ain't Around" (1989)

"Cross My Broken Heart" is a song written by Verlon Thompson and Kye Fleming, and recorded by American country music artist Suzy Bogguss. It was released in June 1989 as the fourth single from the album Somewhere Between. The song reached number 14 on the Billboard Hot Country Singles & Tracks chart.

== Chart performance ==
Chart (1989)	Peak position
Canada Country Singles (RPM)	17
US Hot Country Songs (Billboard)	14
