= Pat Bergeson =

American guitarist and harmonica player (born 1961)

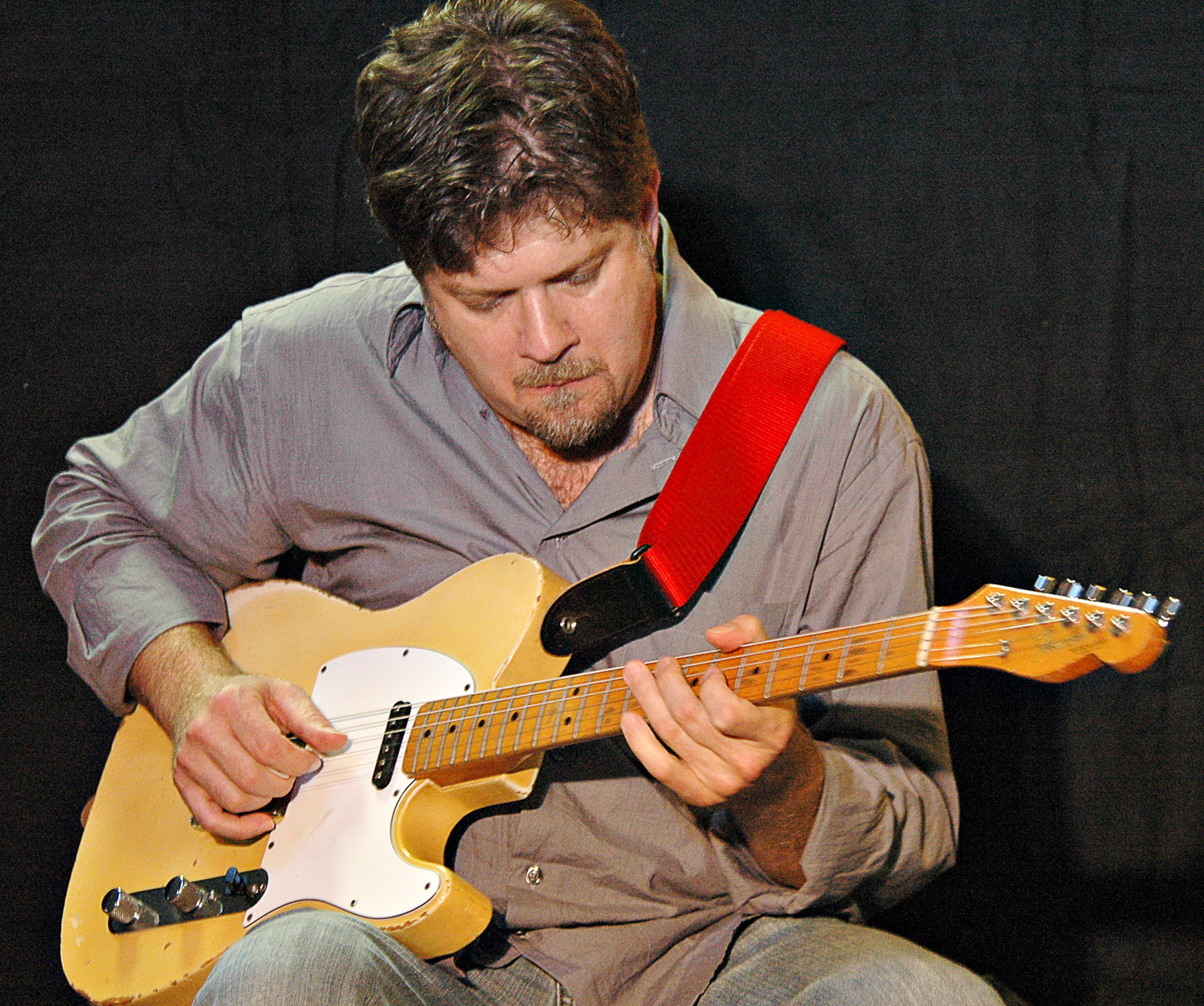
- Bergeson playing his 1967 Fender Esquire at the 3rd annual Tommy Emmanuel Guitar Festival in Rietberg, Germany

Background information
- Born: March 11, 1961 (age 65); Batavia, Illinois
- Origin: Nashville, Tennessee
- Genres: Jazz, country, rock, pop, blues
- Occupations: Musician, songwriter
- Instruments: Guitar, harmonica
- Website: Official website

Patrick Bergeson (born March 11, 1961) is an American guitarist and harmonica player, as well as an occasional songwriter. Based in Nashville, he is best known for his live and session work with Chet Atkins, Lyle Lovett, Suzy Bogguss, and Les Brers.

== Biography ==
Bergeson was born in Batavia, Illinois, and first started playing drums and later picked up the guitar and the harmonica. He studied music at the University of Illinois in Urbana and then moved to New York City, studied Jazz at William Paterson University and worked in New York for ten years. After hearing him on a demo tape made by Robert Lee Castleman, Chet Atkins invited Bergeson to play on his record Sneakin' Around with Jerry Reed. Upon Atkins' request Bergeson moved to Nashville and soon established himself as a sought after session and live musician.

Equally at home with guitar and diatonic and chromatic harmonica styles, Bergeson toured and recorded with Atkins for several years and afterwards became a member of Lyle Lovett's band and also toured with Shelby Lynne . His recording credits include albums by such diverse artists as Chet Atkins, Chuck Loeb, Sixpence None the Richer, Randy Travis, Emmylou Harris, Bill Evans, Jon Randall, Jeff Coffin, Michael McDonald, Martin Taylor, Kenny Rogers, Suzy Bogguss, Alison Krauss, Asleep at the Wheel, Jesse Winchester, Martina McBride, Gail Davies, Bill Frisell, Lyle Lovett, and Jill Sobule and Annie Sellick. Bergeson also contributed to various movie soundtracks, including Ratatouille: What's Cooking?, Diary of a Mad Black Woman, Dr. T & the Women, Two If by Sea and Michael.

Bergeson co-wrote songs for artists like Chet Atkins (Mountains of Illinois with Atkins himself and Take a Look at Her Now with R.L. Kass aka Robert Lee Castleman for the album Read My Licks), Alison Krauss (That Kind of Love with Michael McDonald for the album Forget About It) and Jeff Coffin (The Evil Boweevil with Coffin, Tom Giampietro and Derek Jones for the album Bloom).

Under his own name, Bergeson has released three CDs with New York vibraphonist Steve Shapiro as well as "Country Gentleman" (A tribute to Chet Atkins) on Green Hill Records, Also "Hippy dance" released in 2011, and a Mel Bay instructional video/DVD for jazz guitar titled Contemporary Improvisation.

Bergeson is also a member of the Hot Club of Nashville with renowned fiddler Stuart Duncan and guitarist Richard Smith among others.

He has recently toured worldwide with singer Madeleine Peyroux, playing electric guitar and mandolin, and repeatedly with Suzy Bogguss.

In 2015 he joined Les Brers, a band led by original Allman Brothers Band drummer Butch Trucks. The band also includes other Allman Brothers alumni Jaimoe, Oteil Burbridge, Jack Pearson and Marc Quinones along with Bruce Katz and Lamar Williams jr.

== Personal life ==
In 1997, he married musician Alison Krauss; they divorced in 2001. They had one child, born in 1999.

== Discography ==
Recordings under his own name:

- Xylophobia (Curious/Sons of Sound), with Steve Shapiro, Marc Johnson, Danny Gottlieb, Kevin Hays, Tim Ries, Mike Davis, Jim Hynes (2002)
- Low Standards (Sons of Sound), with Steve Shapiro, Doug Weiss, Scott Kreitzer, Jeff Williams, Annie Sellick (2005)
- Country Gentleman – A Tribute To Chet Atkins feat. Pat Bergeson (Green Hill), with Tommy Emmanuel, Suzy Bogguss, Richard Smith, Paul Yandell and others (2007)
- Backward Compatible (Apria), with Steve Shapiro, Annie Sellick, Marc Johnson and others (2008)
- Contemporary Improvisation (Mel Bay), instructional DVD for jazz guitar
- Hippy Dance (Angelbutt), with Dan Anderson, Tom Roady, Jeff Coffin, Steve Shapiro and others (2011)
