= Gary Harrison =

American songwriter

- Birth name: Gary Steven Harrison
- Origin: Memphis, Tennessee
- Genres: Country
- Occupations: Songwriter
- Years active: 1970s–present

Gary Steven Harrison is an American songwriter.

Harrison began his career in the 1970s, and has written over 300 major-label recorded songs, including several number one hits. His songwriting credits include: "Hey Cinderella" (recorded by Suzy Bogguss); "I Hate Everything" a number one recording by George Strait); "I Just Wanted You to Know" (recorded by Mark Chesnutt); "I Thought It Was You" (recorded by Doug Stone); "Lying in Love with You" (recorded by Jim Ed Brown and Helen Cornelius); "Strawberry Wine" (with Matraca Berg, recorded by Deana Carter); "Wild Angels" (with Matraca Berg; recorded by Martina McBride); "Wrong Side of Memphis" (with Matraca Berg, recorded by Trisha Yearwood), and "Everybody Knows" recorded by Trisha Yearwood.

Other artists who have recorded his work include: Kenny Chesney, Tim McGraw, Kenny Rogers, Patty Loveless, Reba Mcentire, Keith Whitley, John Michael Montgomery, Billy Ray Cyrus, Charley Pride, Anne Murray, Mindy McCready, Diamond Rio, Sammy Kershaw, Emmylou Harris, Ronnie Milsap, Lauren Alaina, Highway 101, Molly Hatchet, Johnny Lee, Collin Raye, Ashley McBryde, Neal McCoy, Easton Corbin, Joe Nichols, Southern Pacific, Bob Welch, Nitty Gritty Dirt Band, Matraca Berg, Pam Tillis, Lorrie Morgan, Clay Walker, Crystal Gayle, Brenda Lee, Breland, B. J. Thomas, Alabama, Michelle Wright, Loverboy, Randy Travis, The Oak Ridge Boys, Conway Twitty, Barbara Mandrell, Lonestar, Steve Wariner, Joe Diffie, Michael Martin Murphey, Marty Balin, Cindy Alexander, Kim Carnes, Henry Gross, Keith Stegall, Shawn Camp, Lee Greenwood, Tim Menzies, Russ Taff, George Canyon, Lindsay Ell, The Kendalls, Chris LeDoux, Sylvia, Mickey Gilley, Eddy Raven, John Conlee, Jo Dee Messina, Bryan White, Boy Howdy, Blaine Larsen, Tammy Cochran, John Berry, The Wreckers, Rick Trevino, Marie Osmond, Eric Heatherly, Pirates of the Mississippi, Chely Wright, Neal Coty, Perfect Stranger, Pinmonkey, Rhett Akins, David Wills and Robin Lee.

Among the awards he has received are the Country Music Association Song of the Year award (for "Strawberry Wine"), Nashville Songwriters Association International Song of the Year Award and sixteen BMI awards (eleven of which have achieved BMI Million-Air status). In 1997, he received the CMA Triple Play award for having three number 1 records within a twelve-month period. He was also nominated for Grammy Awards for "Strawberry Wine" and "A Face in the Crowd".

Harrison worked for Mercury Records Nashville as senior director of A&R from 1994 to 2002, where he was involved in the creative direction of the careers of such artists as: Kathy Mattea, Billy Ray Cyrus, Terri Clark, Sammy Kershaw and Mark Wills. He then became a partner in Bigger Picture Music Group, a music publishing and production company.
