= Hopelessly Yours =

1989 song performed by John Conlee

Single by John Conlee

from the album Fellow Travelers
- B-side: "I Love You"
- Released: 1989
- Genre: Country
- Length: 2:40
- Label: 16th Avenue
- Songwriters: Keith Whitley, Curly Putman, Don Cook
- Producer: Bud Logan

John Conlee singles chronology
"Fellow Travelers" (1989)	"Hopelessly Yours" (1989)	"Doghouse" (1990)

"Hopelessly Yours"

Single by Lee Greenwood with Suzy Bogguss

from the album A Perfect 10
- A-side: "Aces"
- Released: 1991
- Genre: Country
- Length: 2:48
- Label: Capitol Nashville
- Songwriters: Keith Whitley, Curly Putman, Don Cook
- Producer: Jerry Crutchfield

Lee Greenwood singles chronology
"Just Like Me" (1991)	"Hopelessly Yours" (1991)	"Between a Rock and a Heartache" (1991)

Suzy Bogguss singles chronology
"All Things Made New Again" (1990)	"Hopelessly Yours" (1991)	"Someday Soon" (1991)

"Hopelessly Yours" is a song written by Keith Whitley, Curly Putman, and Don Cook. Whitley recorded a demo that was never officially released. The first release was by George Jones on his 1986 album Wine Colored Roses.

The song is more well known from a version American country music artist John Conlee released on his 1989 album, Fellow Travelers. It was released as the album's third single in 1989 and peaked at number 67 on the Billboard Hot Country Singles chart. Before its release, Conlee included it as the B-side to his 1989 single "Hit the Ground Runnin'", which peaked at number 43.

The song was covered as a duet by American country music artists Lee Greenwood and Suzy Bogguss in 1991, and released as the first single from Greenwood's album A Perfect 10. In 1992, it was nominated for Best Country Vocal Collaboration at the Grammy Awards. It reached number 12 on the Billboard Hot Country Singles & Tracks chart. This version was released only as an airplay single, and did not feature a B-side.

== Chart performance ==
=== John Conlee ===
Chart (1989)	Peak position
US Hot Country Songs (Billboard)	67

=== Lee Greenwood and Suzy Bogguss ===
Chart (1991)	Peak position
Canada Country Singles (RPM)	4
US Hot Country Songs (Billboard)	12
US Country National Airplay (Radio & Records)	5

==== Year-end charts ====
Chart (1991)	Position
Canada Country Tracks (RPM)	58
