= Letting Go (Suzy Bogguss song) =

Single by Suzy Bogguss

from the album Aces
- B-side: "Music on the Wind"
- Released: July 1992
- Genre: Country
- Length: 4:33
- Label: Liberty; B-57801
- Songwriters: Doug Crider; Matt Rollings
- Producers: Suzy Bogguss; Jimmy Bowen

Suzy Bogguss singles chronology
"Aces" (1992)	"Letting Go" (1992)	"Drive South" (1992)

"Letting Go" is a song written by Doug Crider and Matt Rollings, and recorded by American country music artist Suzy Bogguss. It was released in July 1992 as the fourth single from her album Aces. The song reached number 6 on the Billboard Hot Country Singles & Tracks chart in October 1992. It also reached number 83 on the UK pop charts, on February 13, 1993.

== Critical reception ==
Billboard gave the song a positive review, saying that it was "unquestionably superb" and had potential for Adult Contemporary crossover. Indeed, the song did cross over and reach #26 on the Gavin Adult Contemporary survey, on October 9, 1992.

== Chart performance ==
Chart (1992)	Peak position
Canada Country Singles (RPM)	9
US Hot Country Songs (Billboard)	6
US Country National Airplay (Radio & Records)	4
UK Singles (Official Charts)	83
