= Somewhere Between (album) =

Studio album by Suzy Bogguss
- Released: March 21, 1989
- Recorded: June – October 1988
- Studio: Syncro-Sound (Nashville, Tennessee)
- Genre: Country (New Traditionalist)
- Length: 32:50
- Label: Capitol
- Producer: Wendy Waldman

Suzy Bogguss chronology
Somewhere Between (1989)	Moment of Truth (1990)

Singles from Somewhere Between
- 1. "I Want to Be a Cowboy's Sweetheart" Released: 1988; 2. "Somewhere Between" Released: 1988; 3. "Cross My Broken Heart" Released: 1989; 4. "My Sweet Love Ain't Around" Released: 1989

Professional ratings
Review scores
Source	Rating
AllMusic	link

Somewhere Between is the debut studio album by the American country music singer-songwriter Suzy Bogguss, released on March 21, 1989, through Capitol Records. Preceded by the singles "I Want to Be a Cowboy's Sweetheart" and "Somewhere Between", the album reached number 41 on the Billboard Top Country Albums during its 37-week chart stay. The album's third single, "Cross My Broken Heart", peaked at number 14 on the Billboard Hot Country Songs. Following the album's success, Bogguss was named the Academy of Country Music's Top New Female Vocalist.

The album is titled after Merle Haggard's song "Somewhere Between", initially released in 1967 on the album Branded Man. "Night Rider's Lament" was originally recorded by Jerry Jeff Walker on his 1975 album, Ridin' High.

== Background and recording ==
The songs "Hopeless Romantic", "I Want to Be a Cowboy's Sweetheart" and "Somewhere Between" predate the LP by some years. "Hopeless Romantic" was a song written by Doug Crider, which Bogguss produced and recorded in her demo tape while working as singer at the Dollywood theme park. Bogguss and Crider eventually married in November 1986. When Wendy Waldman was advanced by Capitol Records as a possible producer, Bogguss found that it was "hard to be totally objective." Although Bogguss was impressed with several male producers who were considered, she decided on having Waldman as producer. Upon discovering a record of Patsy Montana's "I Want to Be a Cowboy's Sweetheart", Bogguss learned the song's yodel by working on it repeatedly until she imitated it.

== Promotional video ==
The only music video made to promote the album was for the titular song, "Somewhere Between". Directed by Armanda Costanza and released in 1988, the video opens with a solo performance by Suzy Bogguss on her instrument at SyncroSound Studios (now known as 615 Music Studios), where the album was recorded. The performance fades to Bogguss leaving a car belonging to her boyfriend and walking alone dejectedly before returning to the solo performance. Next, it fades into Bogguss spending time in the park with her dog as well as her boyfriend, portrayed by Billy Dean, before returning again to the solo performance for the second chorus. During the instrumental break, Bogguss watches her boyfriend leave in his car before fading back to the performance again for the second verse. Bogguss and her boyfriend take photos of themselves in the park, followed by Bogguss singing by herself. The scene reverts to the solo performance once again for the finale. In the closing seconds of the video, the studio's engineer finishes recording and gives positive comments on her performance.

== Track listing ==
No.	Title	Writer(s)	Length
1.	"Somewhere Between"	Merle Haggard	3:29
2.	"Guilty as They Come"	Susanna Clark, Rodney Crowell	3:08
3.	"I'm at Home on the Range"	Suzy Bogguss, Doug Crider, Verlon Thompson	3:00
4.	"My Sweet Love Ain't Around"	Hank Williams	3:12
5.	"Handyman's Dream"	Gary Nicholson, Pam Tillis	2:23
6.	"I Want to Be a Cowboy's Sweetheart"	Patsy Montana	2:56
7.	"Cross My Broken Heart"	Kye Fleming, Thompson	3:48
8.	"Take It Like a Man"	Bogguss, Gary Scruggs	3:46
9.	"Hopeless Romantic"	Crider	3:06
10.	"Night Rider's Lament"	Michael Burton	4:02
Total length:			32:50

LP edition

Side 1
No.	Title	Writer(s)	Length
1.	"Somewhere Between"	Merle Haggard	3:29
2.	"Guilty as They Come"	Susanna Clark, Rodney Crowell	3:08
3.	"I'm at Home on the Range"	Suzy Bogguss, Doug Crider, Verlon Thompson	3:00
4.	"My Sweet Love Ain't Around"	Hank Williams	3:12
5.	"Handyman's Dream"	Gary Nicholson, Pam Tillis	2:23

Side 2
No.	Title	Writer(s)	Length
6.	"I Want to Be a Cowboy's Sweetheart"	Patsy Montana	2:56
7.	"Cross My Broken Heart"	Kye Fleming, Thompson	3:48
8.	"Take It Like a Man"	Bogguss, Gary Scruggs	3:46
9.	"Hopeless Romantic"	Crider	3:06
10.	"Night Rider's Lament"	Michael Burton	4:02

== Personnel ==
- Suzy Bogguss – vocals
- Matt Rollings – keyboards (1–8, 10)
- Tony Migliore – accordion
- Gary Prim – keyboards (9)
- Brent Rowan – guitars
- Jerry Douglas – dobro
- Paul Franklin – pedal steel guitar, pedal dobro
- Mark O'Connor – mandolin, fiddle (1–4, 6–10)
- Craig Nelson – bass
- Eddie Bayers – drums
- Terry McMillan – percussion
- Rob Hajacos – fiddle (5)
- Craig Bickhardt – backing vocals
- Vince Gill – backing vocals
- Mac McAnally – backing vocals
- Harry Stinson – backing vocals
- Wendy Waldman – backing vocals

=== Production ===
- Wendy Waldman – producer
- John Wiles – recording
- Dennis Ritchie – additional recording
- Jeff Geidt – assistant engineer
- Daniel Johnston – assistant engineer
- Eric Prestidge – mixing, mastering
- Ken Love – mastering
- MasterMix (Nashville, Tennessee) – mixing and mastering location
- Virginia Team – art direction
- Jerry Joyner – design
- Peter Nash – photography
- Riqué – hair, make-up
- Chet Atkins – liner notes

== Chart positions ==
=== Album ===
Chart (1989)	Peak position
U.S. Billboard Top Country Albums	41

=== Singles ===
Year	Single	Peak positions	
Year	Single	US Country	CAN Country
1988	"I Want to Be a Cowboy's Sweetheart"	77	
1988	"Somewhere Between"	46	57
1989	"Cross My Broken Heart"	14	17
1989	"My Sweet Love Ain't Around"	38	26

== Release details ==
Country	Date	Label	Format	Catalog
US	1989	Liberty	LP	C1-90237
			CS	C4-90237
	1991	Capitol	CD	CDP 90237
