= Suzy Bogguss =

American singer (born 1956)

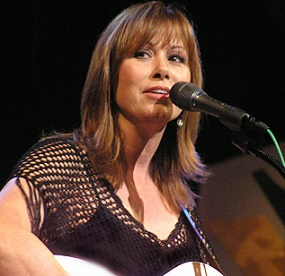
- Bogguss in 2006
- Born: Susan Kay Bogguss; December 30, 1956 (age 69); Aledo, Illinois, U.S.
- Education: Illinois State University (BSc)
- Occupations: Musician; singer; songwriter
- Spouse: Doug Crider (m. 1986)
- Children: 1
- Musical career
- Genres: Country; folk
- Instruments: Vocals; guitar; keyboards
- Years active: 1977–present
- Labels: Capitol/EMI; Liberty/EMI; Platinum; Compadre; Loyal Dutchess; Proper
- Awards: Top New Female Vocalist; Horizon Award
- Website: www.suzybogguss.com

Susan Kay Bogguss (born December 30, 1956) is an American country music singer and songwriter. She began her career in the 1980s as a solo singer. In the 1990s, six of her songs were top 10 hits, three albums were certified gold, and one album received a platinum certification. She won Top New Female Vocalist from the Academy of Country Music and the Horizon Award from the Country Music Association. She was inducted into the Grand Ole Opry on January 16, 2026.

== Early life and rise to success ==
Susan Kay Bogguss was born on December 30, 1956, in Aledo, Illinois, United States, the youngest of four born to Barbara "B.J." (née Stewart) and Charles "Bud" Bogguss. Charles was an Army officer who served in the Pacific Ocean theatre of World War II, and later became a machinist who worked at an International Harvester plant at East Moline. B.J. was a secretary-auditor for a Midwest grocery chain. Her grandmothers played piano at theaters. At age 5, she began singing in the Angel Choir of the College Avenue Presbyterian Church in her hometown. With her parents' encouragement, she took lessons in piano and drums, and as a teenager picked up the guitar as well. In her youth, Bogguss would visit Roy Rogers and Dale Evans at their home in Apple Valley, California, as they attended the same church as her grandparents. She starred in several musicals at Aledo High School, where she was crowned homecoming queen. After graduating in 1975, she enrolled at Illinois Wesleyan University in Bloomington, but later transferred to Illinois State University (ISU) in Normal. She graduated from ISU in 1980 with a bachelor's degree in metalsmithing. She would later use those skills to produce her own jewelry.

Bogguss later recalled of her interest in music, "Being from a small town I didn’t realize that somebody had to make this stuff. I was so green. I also knew about Elton John and other big performers, but it never occurred to me that somebody like me from my small town could make a living making music." Having sung and played guitar and drums in local coffeehouses during her college years, Bogguss embarked on a nationwide tour as a folk troubadour after graduating from ISU. At the time, she was drawn to other singers such as Emmylou Harris, James Taylor and Bonnie Raitt. During this time, she produced her first independent album for Old Shack Recording: Suzy. The LP was available for purchase at her shows and is now a rare collector's item. In 1984, while touring at the Huntley Lodge resort in Montana, Bogguss discovered that she spent most of her money on clothes for her later shows. She also realized that she had no health insurance, very little car insurance, and low chances of performing further, and there were no talent scouts.

After moving to Nashville, Tennessee, in 1985, Bogguss began working at the local Tony Roma's restaurant on her first day there. Also in 1985, she performed a three-day audition for entertainer Dolly Parton at Silver Dollar City, a theme park which would eventually become Dollywood. The following year, she became the first featured female performer at the park, playing four solo shows at the park's train station and appearing in the "Jamboree" show. On performing at the train station, Bogguss later recalled that "I kept thinking, 'I'm going to get black lung disease [from the coal train in Dollywood].'" Bogguss said that performing at the park "was the first situation where I knew that every time I introduced a song by a country artist, they knew who the artist's mom was, who his or her brothers and sisters were and who he or she was married to." These performances prompted her to make a self-produced demo recording at a studio owned by folk singer Wendy Waldman, who would eventually become Bogguss's first producer. Bogguss made several copies and sold them while performing in Dollywood. At the time, she recorded a demo of "Hopeless Romantic", a song written by Doug Crider that would become part of her debut studio album. Crider and Bogguss met, and eventually married in November 1986. The demo soon caught the attention of Capitol Records president Jim Foglesong, who offered her a recording contract on the Liberty/Capitol Nashville label.

== Liberty/Capitol recording career ==
In 1987, Bogguss released her first three singles for Capitol, a cover of The Ink Spots' 1941 song "I Don't Want to Set the World on Fire," "Love Will Never Slip Away," and "Come as You Were". Two of these singles succeeded in making the lower reaches of the Billboard Hot Country Songs charts. Her debut studio album for Capitol, Somewhere Between was released in March 1989. Somewhere Between, with its blend of traditional and contemporary styles, drew positive reviews from critics. The album's second single, "Cross My Broken Heart," became a top-20 hit on the country music charts. The same year, Bogguss won the award for Top New Female Vocalist by the Academy of Country Music.

For her second album, Moment of Truth, production tasks were taken over by new label-head and Nashville producer Jimmy Bowen, who moved Bogguss's sound in a more polished direction. However, the album's two singles failed to rise beyond the lower reaches of the Hot Country Songs charts. A duet she recorded with Lee Greenwood, "Hopelessly Yours," went to No. 12 on the country singles chart and received a Grammy Award nomination for Best Country Vocal Collaboration.

In 1991 Bogguss released her third studio album, the platinum-selling Aces. The LP yielded four hit singles - "Someday Soon", "Outbound Plane", "Aces", and "Letting Go", the latter three reaching the country Top Ten. At the 1992 Country Music Association Awards Bogguss won the Horizon Award. In September of that year, Bogguss began designing women's leather apparel; the apparel was sold in stores on the West Coast.

Her 1992 follow-up, Voices in the Wind, earned Bogguss her second straight gold record. The album's first single, a cover of John Hiatt's 1988 song "Drive South", peaked at number two on Hot Country Songs, representing her highest peak on that chart. Her streak continued the following year with another gold record, Something Up My Sleeve, giving her two additional Top Five hits in "Just Like the Weather" and "Hey Cinderella". The latter, which she cowrote with Matraca Berg and Gary Harrison, has gone on to become one of Bogguss's signature songs. In May 1993, Bogguss appeared on the CBS television special The Women of Country.

Eventually, Bogguss became the sole producer of her sixth studio album, Simpatico. The album consisted of duets with long-time friend and guitarist Chet Atkins. The album was released in 1994, and though it was generally well reviewed, its only single, "One More for the Road," did not chart. That same year, Bogguss's Greatest Hits album was released and went gold. Later, Bogguss collaborated with Alison Krauss, Kathy Mattea, and Crosby, Stills, and Nash to contribute "Teach Your Children" to the AIDS benefit compilation album Red Hot + Country produced by the Red Hot Organization.

Upon completing Simpatico, Bogguss temporarily set her music aside to start a family. Bogguss and Crider's first child, Benton Charles Crider, was born on March 17, 1995. She also scaled down her touring dates as a result for three years. In May of that year, Bogguss performed at the White House with Kathy Mattea and Alison Krauss. This event later aired on PBS stations in September as Women of Country Music. In July 1996, she released her seventh studio album, entitled Give Me Some Wheels. During her break, the climate of country music had changed considerably, with more pop-oriented female singers such as Martina McBride, Faith Hill, and Shania Twain dominating the charts. Bogguss's traditional, straightforward style failed to connect with younger listeners, and the record yielded low sales. In March 1997, Bogguss performed at the Every Woman's Challenge charity concert, which was held at the Palm Springs Convention Center in California.

After her next album, 1998's Nobody Love, Nobody Gets Hurt, also proved unsuccessful, Bogguss was dropped from Capitol. On February 18, 1999, Bogguss issued the following statement:

I had a great tenure with Capitol, during which I weathered a lot of changes in both personnel and philosophy. From Jim Foglesong to Pat Quigley and everyone in between, I appreciate having been a part of the Capitol family. We celebrated a lot of successes together, including Grammy nominations, hit records, and platinum albums. I have a number of projects on my plate right now. This gives me the freedom to pursue those opportunities.

== Indie label recording career ==
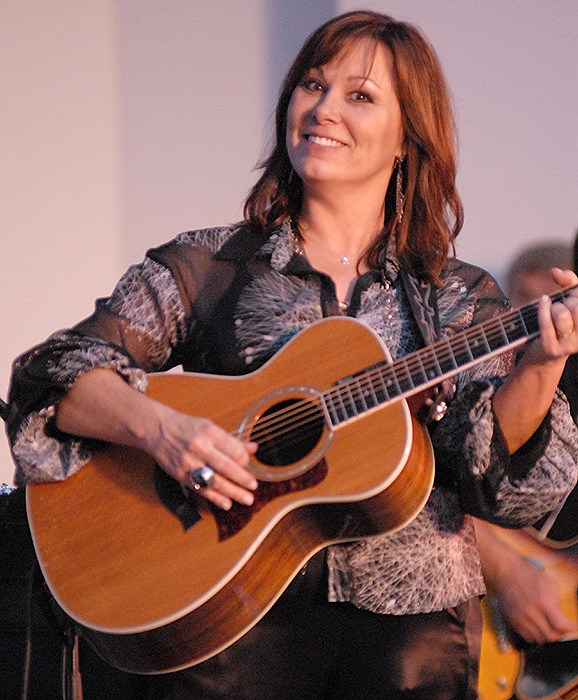
Suzy Bogguss performing in Aledo, Illinois in 2009

Following her departure from Capitol, Bogguss signed with Nashville-based fledgling label Platinum Records, headed by former Capitol executive George Collier. Within three months, she had released her self-titled ninth studio album, Suzy Bogguss. Once again, the album was commercially unsuccessful, with her only single "Goodnight" making an appearance on the country charts.

In 2001, Bogguss founded her own record label, Loyal Dutchess. The label's first album, Live at Caffé Milano, documents three separate 1999 performances at the Caffé Milano in Nashville. This release is only available for purchase at Bogguss's official website. In November 2001, she released the holiday album, Have Yourself a Merry Little Christmas, a compilation of new and previously available material included through a special licensing agreement with Capitol. In addition to being available at her website, the album was also offered through Amazon.com, select retailers, and at her live performances.

In March 2003, Bogguss and Loyal Dutchess Records signed a deal with Compadre Records. Her first release on this label was the Western swing album, Swing, that she had been recording with producer Ray Benson, the bandleader of Western swing group Asleep at the Wheel. Although the album saw only lukewarm sales (it reached No. 6 on the jazz album charts, but failed to appear on the Billboard 200), it was well received by critics. Bogguss' next album, Sweet Danger, was released in 2007. The album peaked at No. 4 on the jazz charts. In July 2011, Bogguss released her twelfth studio album, American Folk Songbook. The album consisted of renditions of several American folk songs, such as "Red River Valley". In addition to the CD, Bogguss and husband Doug Crider also produced a companion hard cover song book that included lyrics, sheet music, and a short history of each song. A paperback version of the songbook became available in 2015.

In February 2014 Bogguss released Lucky a collection of songs written by Merle Haggard. To partially fund the promotion of the album she created a very successful Kickstarter crowd funding campaign which raised over $75,000 with the participation of nearly 1000 contributors. The album was promoted through the Americana format and was well received.

During the summer of 2016, Bogguss conducted a celebration via her Suzy Bogguss Music Facebook page, of the 25th anniversary of the release of her Platinum selling Aces Album in 1991. Aces also was her break out album which brought her serious attention on Country Radio and secured her future on Capitol Nashville for several more albums. On August 18, 2016, the actual 25th anniversary of the release of the original Aces album, she released a new re-imagined and rerecorded version of the album entitled Aces Redux. A release party and concert was held that night at the "3rd and Lindsley" venue in Nashville. Aces Redux was recorded with the help of a number of the musicians that have toured with Bogguss over the years and included background vocals by friends Beth Nielsen Chapman and Kim Carnes along with several others. The album takes a more acoustic and simpler production tack than the original which also reflects her more recent touring approach as a trio with Charlie Chadwick on standup Bass and Craig Smith on lead guitar.

Bogguss's 17th studio album, Prayin' for Sunshine, was released on November 3, 2023. It marks the first time she is credited as a writer of all songs on one of her albums. MusicRow said the album "captures the unvarnished essence of southern storytelling and the authentic roots of Americana music." In a review for the lead single, "It All Falls Down to the River", American Songwriter called the song "a lyrical gut-punch, shining a light on hard truths about life in the United States. From the site of Martin Luther King Jr.’s assassination to the levees of New Orleans that broke during Hurricane Katrina, Bogguss and The McCrary Sisters paint a powerful picture of our nation’s complex past and present." In an album review, No Depression said the album "showcases Bogguss’ lyrical and musical ingenuity, her nod-and-a-wink humor, and her deep love for her community of friends and fans. And the album reminds us again just how radiant and transportive Bogguss’ vocals are."

On October 11, 2025, Bogguss was performing at the Grand Ole Opry to celebrate her friend Kathy Mattea's induction as the newest member. During a performance of Mattea's "Eighteen Wheels and a Dozen Roses" alongside Mattea, Terri Clark, and Trisha Yearwood, Mattea interrupted her own song moments after her own induction to invite Bogguss to become the next member of the Opry, which she accepted. This was the first time in Opry history that an induction and invitation had occurred during the same show. Her induction by Reba McEntire took place on January 16, 2026.

== Awards and nominations ==
Year	Association	Category	Nominated work / Recipient	Result
1989	Academy of Country Music Awards	Top New Female Vocalist	Suzy Bogguss	Won
1992	Grammy Awards	Best Country Vocal Collaboration	Hopelessly Yours (with Lee Greenwood)	Nominated
1992	Country Music Association Awards	Horizon Award	Suzy Bogguss	Won
1993	Academy of Country Music Awards	Top Female Vocalist	Suzy Bogguss	Shortlisted
1993	27th TNN/Music City News Country Awards	Female Artist of the Year	Suzy Bogguss	Nominated
1993	27th TNN/Music City News Country Awards	Star of Tomorrow	Suzy Bogguss	Nominated
1993	Country Music People International	Rising Star Award	Suzy Bogguss	Won
1994			Suzy Bogguss	
1994	Academy of Country Music Awards	Top Female Vocalist	Suzy Bogguss	Shortlisted
1994	Academy of Country Music Awards	Top Vocal Duo of the Year	Suzy Bogguss and Billy Dean	Shortlisted
1994	Academy of Country Music Awards	Album of the Year	Common Thread: The Songs of the Eagles	Nominated
1994	28th TNN/Music City News Country Awards	Album of the Year	Common Thread: The Songs of the Eagles	Nominated
1994	Country Music Association Awards	Album of the Year (as artist)	Common Thread: The Songs of the Eagles	Won
1994	Country Music Association Awards	Album of the Year (as producer)	Common Thread: The Songs of the Eagles	Won
1994	Country Music Association Awards	Album of the Year	Tribute to the Music of Bob Wills and the Texas Playboys	Nominated
1995	Grammy Awards	Best Country Collaboration with Vocals	Teach Your Children (with Kathy Mattea, Graham Nash, and Alison Krauss)	Nominated
1995	Grammy Awards	Best Country Album	Tribute to the Music of Bob Wills and the Texas Playboys	Nominated
1995	29th TNN/Music City News Country Awards	Vocal Collaboration of the Year	Suzy Bogguss & Chet Atkins	Nominated
1995	Country Music Association Awards	Vocal Event of the Year	Sorry Seems to Be the Hardest Word (with Chet Atkins)	Nominated
1996	Grammy Awards	Best Country Collaboration with Vocals	All My Loving (with Chet Atkins)	Nominated
2005	Grammy Awards	Best Traditional Folk Album	Beautiful Dreamer: The Songs of Stephen Foster (various artists)	Won
2013	Grammy Awards	Best Folk Album	This One's for Him: A Tribute to Guy Clark (various artists)	Nominated
2024	Illinois Rock & Roll Museum's Hall of Fame	Founder's Choice	Suzy Bogguss	Won
