= Fascination (album) =

Studio album by The Greencards
- Released: April 21, 2009
- Genre: Newgrass
- Label: Sugar Hill

The Greencards chronology
Viridian (2007)	Fascination (2009)	The Brick Album (2011)

Professional ratings
Review scores
Source	Rating
AllMusic	4/5 stars

Fascination is the fourth studio album released by the progressive bluegrass band, The Greencards. It was their first album released on the Sugar Hill Records label. Released on April 21, 2009, it draws inspiration from bluegrass, rock, and blues. The album was described by member Carol Young as their own kind of sound, resulting from several years touring together. The track, "The Crystal Merchant", was nominated for the Grammy Award for Best Country Instrumental Performance.

== Fascination track list ==
1. Fascination (Carol Young, Jake Stargel, Kym Warner, Eamon McLoughlin)
2. Outskirts Of Blue (Kym Warner, Robbie Gjersoe)
3. The Avenue (Carol Young)
4. Chico Calling (Carol Young, Jedd Hughes)
5. Three Four Time (Bill Whitbeck, Carol Young, Kym Warner)
6. Davey Jones (Gordie Sampson, Michael Logen)
7. Little Siam (Kym Warner, Jake Stargel)
8. Water In The Well (Kym Warner, Bill Whitbeck)
9. Into The Blue (Carol Young, Kym Warner, Jedd Hughes)
10. Rivertown (Kym Warner, Carol Young)
11. The Crystal Merchant (Kym Warner, Todd Lombardo)
12. Lover I Love The Best (Carol Young)
