= Viridian (The Greencards album) =

Studio album by The Greencards
- Released: March 6, 2007
- Recorded: Nashville, Tennessee
- Genre: Newgrass
- Label: Dualtone Records
- Producer: Doug Lancio

The Greencards chronology
| Weather and Water (2005) | Viridian (2007) | Fascination (2009) |

Professional ratings
Review scores
| Source | Rating |
|---|---|
| AllMusic | 4/5 stars |

Viridian is a 2007 studio album by the Austin, Texas bluegrass band The Greencards. Their third Dualtone Records studio album, it was released on March 6, 2007. It was nominated at the 2007 ARIA Music Awards for Best Country Album, but lost to Keith Urban for Love, Pain & The Whole Crazy Thing.

== Recording ==
In 2007, The Greencards were joined by Matt Wingate, a guitarist from Alabama, for their work on Viridian. On their previous albums, The Greencards had individually recorded their separate musical tracks in isolation booths of recording studios, but for Viridian, recorded their album together in real time in an open room, which was said to be a factor in a spontaneous feel for some of the album.

Most of the songs on Viridian are sung by Young, and all of the tracks on Viridian were written by The Greencards, with the exception of "Travel On", which was penned by Kim Richey of Nashville. Their sound, through Viridian, was likened to the Canadian alternative country band The Duhks.

== Influences ==
The recordings on Viridian, in particular the songs "River of Sand", "Waiting on the Night" and "When I Was in Love With You", were said to evoke the sounds of progressive folk rock that emerged in the 1960s. The progressive nature of The Greencards' bluegrass sound has been compared to Nickel Creek and Alison Krauss & Union Station's own musical work to expand bluegrass.

The lyrics on "When I Was in Love With You" were cited as among the most striking on Viridian, and were based in part by McLoughlin on a poem from the 1896 collection, A Shropshire Lad, by Alfred Edward Housman, the English poet. The song was described as a "Pogues-like romp." In a review of Viridian, Embo Blake of Hybrid Magazine noted Carol Young's vocal skill, as she "effortlessly diphthongs cadence" on the track "Waiting On The Night".

According to ABC News in Dallas/Fort Worth, the album has a traditional bluegrass core, with a worldly flavor. Doug Lancio, a producer who had previously worked with Patty Griffin, was said to have been a positive factor in the success of Viridian. Prior to the 2007 album, Lancio had not previously worked with The Greencards.

== Acclaim ==
After its release, Viridian claimed the #1 position on Billboard Magazine's Bluegrass Music Chart. The Greencards are the first international musical act to ever reach #1 on the Bluegrass Music Chart.

In December 2007, it was announced that their song "Mucky the Duck" from Viridian was nominated for the Grammy Award for Best Country Instrumental Performance at the 50th Grammy Awards, but ultimately lost to Brad Paisley's "Throttleneck." Written by Warner, the song was inspired by one of the band's favorite Austin musical venues, The Mucky Duck. Eamon McLoughlin is a regular blogger for Country Music Television. After the Grammy Awards, he wrote about the band's experience at the event.

In the wake of Viridian, The Greencards have been internationally referred to as one of the most popular Americana musical acts in the United States. Bruce Elder of the Sydney Morning Herald called Viridian a tour de force, and has said that the band may, after this album, be the best country music performers to ever come out of Australia.

== Track listing ==
| No. | Title | Writer(s) | Length |
|---|---|---|---|
| 1. | "Waiting on the Night" | Carol Young / Jedd Hughes | 3:34 |
| 2. | "Here You Are" | Jedd Hughes | 3:53 |
| 3. | "River of Sand" | David Mead / Kym Warner | 3:53 |
| 4. | "Who Knows" | Carol Young / Kym Warner / Ronnie Bowman | 5:32 |
| 5. | "All the Way From Italy" | Jedd Hughes / Kym Warner | 4:24 |
| 6. | "Su Prabhat" | Eamon McLoughlin / Robbie Gjersoe | 2:06 |
| 7. | "Shinin' in the Dark" | Jerry Salley / Kym Warner | 2:44 |
| 8. | "When I Was in Love With You" | Eamon McLoughlin | 3:58 |
| 9. | "I Don't Want to Lose You" | Kim Richey | 3:13 |
| 10. | "Lonesome Side of Town" | Jerry Salley / Kym Warner | 3:35 |
| 11. | "Travel On" | Kim Richey | 3:49 |
| 12. | "Mucky the Duck" | Kym Warner | 3:27 |

A Fleetwood Mac cover, "Second Hand News", is included as hidden track.

== Personnel ==
- Larry Atamanuik - banjo, drums, percussion
- Chris Carmichael - string arrangements
- Jedd Hughes - guitar, vocal harmony
- Viktor Krauss - bass
- Doug Lancio - bass, guitar, percussion
- Eamon McLoughlin - cello, fiddle, viola, vocals
- Bryan Sutton - guitar, mandolin
- Kym Warner - bouzouki, mandolin, slide mandolin, vocals
- Carol Young - bass, vocals
- Andrea Zonn - vocal harmony
