= The Brick Album =

Studio album by The Greencards
- Released: June 21, 2011
- Genre: Newgrass
- Length: 55:20
- Label: Darling Street Records
- Producer: Justin Niebank

The Greencards chronology
Fascination (2009)	The Brick Album (2011)	Sweetheart of the Sun (2013)

The Brick Album is the fifth studio album by The Greencards. It was released on June 21, 2011 through Darling Street Records and produced by Justin Niebank. The album continues the band's exploration of the newgrass style, blending traditional bluegrass instrumentation with contemporary folk and Americana influences.

== Track listing ==
No.	Title	Writer(s)	Length
1.	"Make It Out West"	Kym Warner, Bill Whitbeck	5:33
2.	"Faded"	Carey Ott, Warner	4:10
3.	"Naked On the River"	John O'Brien	4:42
4.	"Heart Fever"	Jedd Hughes, Warner, Carol Young	3:49
5.	"Mrs. Madness"	Warner	3:49
6.	"Adelaide"	Ross Holmes, Warner	2:53
7.	"Here Lies John"	O'Brien	3:25
8.	"Girl in the Telescope"	Hughes, Warner, Young	3:47
9.	"Said and Done"	Michael Logen, Warner	5:56
10.	"Far From an Only Child"	Kai Welch, Warner	2:47
11.	"Tale of Kangario"	Todd Lombardo, Warner	3:32
12.	"Loving You Is the Only Way to Fly"	Sarah Buxton, Rodney Crowell, Hughes	3:17
13.	"Tale of Kangario" (reprise)	Lombardo, Warner	3:32

== Chart performance ==
Chart (2011)	Peak position
U.S. Billboard Top Bluegrass Albums	8
