= Sweetheart of the Sun (The Greencards album) =

Studio album by The Greencards
- Released: August 20, 2013
- Genre: Newgrass
- Length: 40:40
- Label: Darling Street
- Producer: Gary Paczosa

The Greencards chronology
The Brick Album (2011)	Sweetheart of the Sun (2013)

Sweetheart of the Sun is the sixth studio album by The Greencards. It was released in August 2013 by Darling Street Records. It was produced, mixed, and recorded by Gary Paczosa with additional engineering by Shani Gandhi at Minutia Studio. Eric Boulanger mastered the recording at The Mastering Lab.

The album was nominated for Best Folk Album at the 56th Grammy Awards.

David Bowling opines, "Sweetheart of the Sun was an ambitious project for the Greencards and they were able to bring their vision to fruition." It continues down a musical path started on The Brick Album. According to Shawn Underwood, "There’s more of the etherealness in the arrangements and layers of vocals and instruments and less of the bluegrass origins of the band...[as] if Gillian and Dave borrowed some production techniques from Pink Floyd."

Sweetheart of the Sun is a concept album dealing with the band's connection to water. As such, many critics recommend listening to the album in its entirety rather than as individual songs.

== Track listing ==
No.	Title	Writer(s)	Length
1.	"Once and Gone"	Kai Welch, Kym Warner, Carol Young	2:02
2.	"Forever Mine" (featuring Sons of Fathers)	Carey Ott, Warner	4:03
3.	"Black, Black Water"	Young, Warner, Welch	3:00
4.	"Paddle the Torrens"	Jedd Hughes, Warner	3:35
5.	"Ocean Floor"	Michael Logen	4:20
6.	"Traveler's Song"	Warner	4:37
7.	"Midnight Ferry"	Warner	0:40
8.	"Wide Eyed Immigrant"	John O'Brien, Warner, Hughes, Young	3:34
9.	"Love and Other Errors"	Welch, Young, Warner, Hughes	2:39
10.	"Ride and Sway"	Warner	3:02
11.	"Boxcar Boys"	Welch, Warner, Young	3:10
12.	"Fly"	Young, Warner, Welch	5:58
Total length:			40:40

== Personnel ==
- Carol Young – vocals, bass, percussion
- Kym Warner – mandolin, mandola, bouzouki, octave OM mandolin, glockenspiel, percussion
- Carl Miner – guitars, omnichord, keys, percussion
- Jedd Hughes – guitars, bouzouki, ukulele, vocals,
- Kai Welch – guitars, bass, accordion, keys, omnichord, vocals
- David Beck – vocals, bass
- Paul Cauthen – vocals
- Eric Darken – percussion
- Aoife O'Donovan – vocals
- Jon Randall – vocals
- Luke Reynolds – bass, steel guitar
- Andrea Zonn – violin, viola
- Gary Paczosa – producer, recording
- Shani Gandhi – recording
