= Standard Brands (album) =

Studio album by Lenny Breau and Chet Atkins
- Released: 1981
- Recorded: 1979, 1980, 1981
- Genre: Jazz
- Length: 33:41
- Label: RCA Victor

Chet Atkins chronology
Country After All These Years (1981)	Standard Brands (1981)	East Tennessee Christmas (1983)

Chet Atkins Collaborations chronology
Reflections (1980)	Standard Brands (1981)	Neck and Neck (1990)

Lenny Breau chronology
The Legendary Lenny Breau... Now! (1979)	Standard Brands (1981)	Mo' Breau (1981)

Standard Brands is an album by guitarists Lenny Breau and Chet Atkins that was released in 1981.

== History ==
Atkins was instrumental in getting Breau his first recording contract after hearing one of the latter's studio tapes. Atkins stated in an interview for Frets magazine: "Paul Yandell first brought Lenny to my attention around 1966. I immediately knew that here was one of the great players of this world. He had taken some of my fragmentary ideas, and gone on and on into musical areas I had never dreamed of."

Due to Breau's drug problems, the album took nearly two years to complete.

Atkins also produced and recorded two other releases by Breau.

== Reception ==
Professional ratings
Review scores
Source	Rating
Allmusic	4.5/5 stars

Writing for Allmusic, music critic Robert Taylor wrote of Standard Brands: "The pairing of these two guitar legends for a series of guitar duets was long overdue, but thankfully was well preserved and finally reissued... The interplay between the duo is a fascinating lesson in the old teaching the new and vice versa... A wonderful piece of guitar history."

== Reissues ==
- The original LP was reissued on CD by One Way Records in 1994.

== Track listing ==
=== Side one ===
1. "Batucada" (Luiz Bonfá) – 3:19
2. "Tenderly" (Walter Gross, Jack Lawrence) – 3:12
3. "Cattle Call" (Tex Owens) – 2:08
4. "Taking a Chance on Love" (Vernon Duke, Ted Fetter, John Latouche) – 4:35
5. "Somebody's Knockin'" (Jerry Gillespie, Ed Penney) – 4:21

=== Side two ===
1. "This Can't Be Love" (Lorenz Hart, Richard Rodgers) – 3:07
2. "This Nearly Was Mine" (Oscar Hammerstein, Richard Rodgers) – 2:39
3. "Going Home" (Antonín Dvořák) – 4:35
4. "Polka Dots and Moonbeams" (Jimmy Van Heusen, Johnny Burke) – 5:45

== Personnel ==
- Chet Atkins – guitar
- Lenny Breau – guitar

Technical

- Chet Atkins, Mike Poston, Mike Shockley - engineer
- Herb Burnette - art direction, photography
