= For the Good Times =

For the Good Times may refer to:

- For the Good Times (song), a 1968 song by Kris Kristofferson, recorded by several artists
- For the Good Times (Ray Price album), 1970
- For the Good Times (Chet Atkins album), 1971
- For the Good Times (Dean Martin album), 1971
- For the Good Times (Rusty Bryant album), 1973
- For the Good Times (The Little Willies album), 2012
- For the Good Times, the title of at least four compilation albums by Kenny Rogers
