= Me & Chet =

Studio album by Chet Atkins and Jerry Reed
- Released: 1972
- Recorded: RCA's "Nashville Sound" Studio, Nashville, Tennessee
- Genre: Country
- Length: 27:00
- Label: RCA Victor
- Producers: Chet Atkins, Jerry Reed

Chet Atkins chronology
The Bandit (1972)	Me & Chet (1972)	American Salute (1972)

Professional ratings
Review scores
Source	Rating
AllMusic	4/5 stars

Me & Chet is the follow-up to Me & Jerry, the successful duet recording by Chet Atkins and Jerry Reed. It was nominated for the 1972 Grammy Award for Best Country Instrumental Performance but did not win. Chet's solo release Chet Atkins Picks on the Hits was nominated in the same category. It reached No. 24 on the Billboard Country Albums chart.

== Reissues ==
In 1998, Me & Jerry and Me & Chet were reissued on CD by One Way Records.

== Track listing ==
=== Side one ===
1. "Jerry’s Breakdown" (Jerry Reed) – 2:09
2. "Limehouse Blues" (Philip Braham, Douglas Furber) – 2:34
3. "Liebestraum" (Franz Liszt) – 2:41
4. "Serenade to Summertime" (Sergio Palito) – 2:33
5. "Nashtown Ville" (Atkins) – 2:04

=== Side two ===
1. "Mystery Train" (Junior Parker, Sam Phillips) – 2:49
2. "The Mad Russian" (Jerry Reed, Paul Yandell) – 2:13
3. "Flying South" (Cindy Walker) – 2:32
4. "Good Stuff" (Reed) – 2:42
5. "All I Ever Need is You" (Jimmy Holiday, Eddie Reeves) – 2:05
6. "I Saw the Light" (Hank Williams) – 3:20

== Personnel ==
- Chet Atkins – guitar
- Jerry Reed – guitar
- Henry Strzelecki – bass
- Stephen Schaffer – bass
- Jimmy Isbell – drums
- Ralph Gallant – drums
- Paul Yandell – guitar
- Floyd Cramer – piano
- Ray Butts – engineer
- Tom Pick – engineer
