= Identified! =

Studio album by Chet Atkins
- Released: 1971
- Recorded: RCA "Nashville Sound" Studios, Nashville, TN
- Genre: Country
- Length: 24:41
- Label: RCA Victor LSP-4472 (Stereo)
- Producer: Bob Ferguson, Chet Atkins

Chet Atkins chronology
| Chet Floyd & Boots (1971) | Identified! (1971) | Picks on the Hits (1972) |

Chet Atkins Collaborations chronology
| Chet Floyd & Boots (1971) | Identified! (1971) | The Bandit (1972) |

Identified! is an album by The Nashville String Band, released in 1971. The band consisted of Chet Atkins and Homer and Jethro.

The musicians are pictured unmasked with their instruments on the back cover. The trio made six albums together.

== Reception ==
Professional ratings
Review scores
| Source | Rating |
|---|---|
| Allmusic | 3/5 stars |

Writing for Allmusic, critic Ken Dryden wrote of the album "Although the session is a tad overproduced with a stingy length of just 24 minutes, and it doesn't sufficiently focus on the solo capabilities of each man, this long out of print RCA LP still has great appeal."

== Track listing ==
=== Side one ===
1. "Colonel Bogey" (F. J. Ricketts) – 2:12
2. "White Silver Sands" (Charles 'Red' Matthews, Gladys Reinhart) – 2:30
3. "Red Wing" (Kerry Mills, Thurland Chattaway) – 2:24
4. "The Three Bells" (Jean Villard, Marc Herrand, Bert Reisfeld) – 2:37
5. "Oklahoma Hills" – 2:26

=== Side two ===
1. "Strollin'" – 2:09
2. "Sweet Dreams" – 2:17
3. "Rocky Top" (Felice Bryant, Boudleaux Bryant) – 2:35
4. "Release Me (And Let Me Love Again)" (Eddie Miller, Dub Wilson) – 2:54
5. "Green Green Grass of Home" (Curly Putman) – 2:37

== Personnel ==
- Chet Atkins - guitar
- Henry "Homer" Haynes - guitar
- Kenneth "Jethro" Burns - mandolin
