= Weather and Water =

Studio album by The Greencards
- Released: June 28, 2005
- Recorded: Nashville, Tennessee
- Genre: Newgrass
- Label: Dualtone Records

The Greencards chronology
| Movin' On (2003) | Weather and Water (2005) | Viridian (2007) |

Professional ratings
Review scores
| Source | Rating |
|---|---|
| AllMusic | 3.5/5 stars |

Weather and Water is a 2005 studio album by the Austin, Texas progressive bluegrass band The Greencards. Their second Dualtone album release of 2005, after their debut 2003 album Movin' On was re-released earlier in the year by their label Dualtone Records, Weather and Water was released on June 28. In a review of Weather and Water in The Washington Post, it was noted that on this album, unlike their debut, the focus was on the music supporting lyrics, rather than the blues virtuosity of Movin' On. In another review, Jim Abbott of the Tribune News Service described The Greencards as polished, "earthy, charming roots music with a sophisticated sheen", but noted that some bluegrass purists may miss the vocal idiosyncrasies that can be found on other bluegrass bands such as the Del McCoury Band. All three members of the band sing on Weather and Water, but Young's voice was noted for its "dreamy, haunting quality". Their music through the Weather and Water album had been called Celtic-influenced and bluegrass-flavored, but noted that the band had a distinctly American sound despite their overseas origins.

Jason Gonulsen of Glide Magazine noted that The Greencards' debut Movin' On didn't capture the band's live energy, but that Weather and Water overcame this, and was one of 2005's best bluegrass albums. In the wake of their release, the band was nominated in the Americana Music Association Awards for 2006 in the category of New/Emerging Artist of the Year, winning the award. The music video for the band's single "Time" from Weather and Water received heavy airplay and rotation on Country Music Television. "Time" was described as the centerpiece track of Weather and Water.

Country Music Television named Weather and Water one of the ten favorite bluegrass albums of the year, saying, "At the nexus of bluegrass, country and pop, this charming trio immediately win over such diverse audiences in concert. Luckily, their winning personality translates to this disc -- even with several melancholy, yet melodic, songs. Not for nothing did Bob Dylan and Willie Nelson choose them to open their summer tour of minor league ballparks." The Greencards were the opening act for Dylan and Nelson on their 2005 summer tour. Kym Warner credits Gary Paczosa, an engineer that worked on Weather and Water, with helping them getting the opportunity to tour with Dylan and Nelson. Paczosa had previously served as an engineer on recordings for Alison Krauss, Nickel Creek and Dolly Parton. "He makes the best-sounding acoustic records in the world", according to Warner. During their tour with Dylan and Nelson, Buzz McClain of The Washington Post observed that The Greencards plays traditional American music due to their deep respect for the material than most American musicians do. Throughout 2005, they toured extensively with Dylan and Nelson, and afterwards toured with Tommy Emmanuel.

Coinciding with their move to Nashville in late 2005, and work on their second album Weather and Water, it was seen as a deliberate move from the jam-style of their debut album Movin' On to instead focus on Americana-focused music. During the 2005 summer tour, Kym Warner wanted to get the chance to pick Dylan's brain, but never had the chance. Warner did not get to spend much time with him, but Dylan told him at the end of the tour, “You’ll be fine from now on.”

== Track listing ==
| No. | Title | Writer(s) | Length |
|---|---|---|---|
| 1. | "The Ghost of Who We Were" | Carol Young, Jedd Hughes | 4:41 |
| 2. | "Weather and Water" | Jedd Hughes | 4:05 |
| 3. | "Almost Home" | Eamon McLoughlin, Kym Warner | 3:58 |
| 4. | "Like a Melody" | Bill Whitbeck, Carol Young, Kym Warner | 3:55 |
| 5. | "Time" | Kym Warner, Carol Young, Bill Whitbeck | 4:31 |
| 6. | "Long Way Down" | Carol Young, Bill Whitbeck, Kym Warner | 5:12 |
| 7. | "Marty's Kitchen" | Kym Warner, Eamon McLoughlin, Carol Young | 3:12 |
| 8. | "What You Are" | Craig Ross, Patty Griffin | 5:34 |
| 9. | "Don't Want Forever" | Kym Warner, Bill Whitbeck, Carol Young | 3:03 |
| 10. | "The Ballad of Kitty Brown" | Rich Brotherton, Eamon McLoughlin | 4:56 |
| 11. | "Bordered on Breakdown" | Jerry Salley, Kym Warner | 3:01 |
| 12. | "The House on Vine Street" | Kym Warner | 2:54 |
