= The Bandit (album) =

Studio album by Chet Atkins
- Released: 1972
- Genre: Country
- Label: RCA Victor LSP-4659
- Producer: Chet Atkins, Ronny Light

Chet Atkins chronology
Picks on the Hits (1972)	The Bandit (1972)	Me & Chet (1972)

Chet Atkins collaborations chronology
Identified! (1971)	The Bandit (1972)	Me & Chet (1972)

The Bandit is an album by The Nashville String Band. The band consisted of Chet Atkins and Homer and Jethro.

== Track listing ==
=== Side one ===
1. "The Bandit"
2. "Estrellita"
3. "Cielito Lindo"
4. "Gay Ranchero" (J. J. Espinosa, Francia Luban)
5. "Marcheta"
6. "The Great El Tigre (The Tiger)"

=== Side two ===
1. "Spanish Eyes"
2. "You Belong to My Heart"
3. "Cumbanchero"
4. "Bandera"
5. "Vaya Con Dios"

== Personnel ==
- Chet Atkins - guitar
- Henry "Homer" Haynes - guitar
- Kenneth "Jethro" Burns - mandolin
- Strings arranged by Bill McElhiney
