= Down Home (The Nashville String Band album) =

Studio album by The Nashville String Band
- Released: 1970
- Recorded: Nashville, Tennessee
- Genre: Country
- Label: RCA Victor
- Producer: Chet Atkins

Chet Atkins chronology
Me & Jerry (1970)	Down Home (1970)	Yestergroovin' (1970)

Chet Atkins collaborations chronology
Me & Jerry (1970)	Down Home (1970)	Strung Up (1971)

Down Home is an album by The Nashville String Band. The band consisted of Chet Atkins and Homer and Jethro.

== Track listing ==
=== Side one ===
1. "Under the Double Eagle" (Josef Wagner)
2. "Just a Closer Walk with Thee" (Traditional)
3. "The Arkansas Traveler" (Sandford C. Faulkner)
4. "Cold, Cold Heart" (Hank Williams)
5. "Fraulein"

=== Side two ===
1. "Wildwood Flower"
2. "Tennessee Rag"
3. "Maiden's Prayer"
4. "South" (Ray Charles, T. Hayes, Bennie Moten)
5. "Mockingbird Hill" (Vaughn Horton)

== Personnel ==
- Chet Atkins – guitar
- Henry "Homer" Haynes – guitar
- Kenneth "Jethro" Burns – mandolin
