= Strung Up =

Strung Up may refer to:

- Strung Up (Sweet album), 1975
- Strung Up (Nashville String Band album), 1971
