= Strung Up (Nashville String Band album) =

Studio album by Chet Atkins
- Released: 1971
- Recorded: Nashville, Tennessee
- Genre: Country
- Label: RCA Victor

Chet Atkins chronology
Pickin' My Way (1970)	Strung Up (1970)	For the Good Times (1971)

Chet Atkins Collaborations chronology
Down Home (1970)	Strung Up (1970)	Chet Floyd & Boots (1971)

Strung Up is a studio album by The Nashville String Band. The band consisted of Chet Atkins and Homer and Jethro.

== Track listing ==
=== Side one ===
1. "Last Train to Clarksville" (Boyce and Hart)
2. "Nola"
3. "Genevieve"
4. "Opryland"
5. "Happy Ending"

=== Side two ===
1. "Alhambra"
2. "El Cóndor Pasa" (Daniel Alomía Robles)
3. "Tennessee Waltz"
4. "The Birth of the Blues" (Lew Brown, Buddy G. DeSylva, Ray Henderson)
5. "Flaky"

== Personnel ==
- Chet Atkins – guitar
- Henry "Homer" Haynes - guitar
- Kenneth "Jethro" Burns - mandolin
- Johnny Gimble – fiddle
