= Me & Jerry =

Studio album by Chet Atkins and Jerry Reed
- Released: 1970
- Recorded: RCA 'Nashville Sound' Studios, Nashville, Tennessee
- Genre: Country, pop
- Length: 26:08
- Label: RCA Victor
- Producer: Bob Ferguson, Chet Atkins

Chet Atkins chronology
Chet Atkins Picks on the Pops (1969)	Me & Jerry (1970)	Down Home (1970)

Me & Jerry is the first duet studio album by Chet Atkins and Jerry Reed, released by RCA Records in 1970. Consisting of pop, country and standards, this collaboration won the 1971 Grammy Award for Best Country Instrumental Performance.

It was followed by Me & Chet in 1972.

== Reception ==
Professional ratings
Review scores
Source	Rating
Allmusic	4.5/5 stars

In his review for Allmusic, critic Stephen Thomas Erlewine wrote of the album; "virtuosity is always more appealing when it doesn't call attention to itself, a trap Atkins and Reed always avoid here. The two simply lay back and play, trading lines and licks with an easy grace, having so much fun that it's impossible to not share in their joy."

== Reissues ==
- In 1998, Me & Jerry and Me & Chet were reissued on CD by One Way Records.

== Track listing ==
=== Side one ===
1. "Tennessee Stud" (Jimmy Driftwood) – 3:05
2. "Bridge Over Troubled Water" (Paul Simon) – 3:06
3. "MacArthur Park" (Jimmy Webb) – 2:45
4. "Ol' Man River" (Oscar Hammerstein, Jerome Kern) – 2:52
5. "Nut Sundae" (Jerry Reed Hubbard) – 2:37

=== Side two ===
1. "Cannonball Rag" (Merle Travis) – 2:13
2. "Wreck of the John B" – 2:55
3. "Stumpwater" (Hubbard) – 2:15
4. "The January February March" (Hubbard) – 2:48
5. "Something" (George Harrison) – 2:14

== Personnel ==
- Chet Atkins – guitar
- Jerry Reed – guitar

== Production notes ==
- Tom Pick – engineer
- Ray Butts – recording technician
- Ashley Scott – cover photo
