= Movin' On (The Greencards album) =

Studio album by The Greencards
- Released: 2003
- Recorded: Austin, Texas
- Genre: Newgrass
- Label: Dualtone Records

The Greencards chronology
Movin' On (2003)	Weather and Water (2005)

Professional ratings
Review scores
Source	Rating
AllMusic	3.5/5 stars

Movin' On is the 2003 debut album by the Austin, Texas progressive bluegrass band The Greencards. The Greencards recorded and self-released Movin' On, selling 10,000 copies at shows and online, and reached #5 on the Americana radio charts. The album was said to break past traditional rules of bluegrass music, by integrating a jam-band mindset while blending classical folk balladry and rock 'n' roll into their sound. After the release of Movin' On in 2004 the Greencards won the Austin Music Awards for Best New Band. The Greencards were credited with performing the most energetic sets during the course of 2004's Austin City Limits Music Festival, were said to bring a global sound to bluegrass, and—by drawing on influences such as Bob Dylan and The Beatles—were pushing the genre's boundaries.

Several months after the awards, the band was signed by Dualtone Records, and began work on their next album, Weather and Water. After joining Dualtone, the label re-released Movin' On in January 2005, generating still more airplay and sales.
