= Homer and Jethro =

American country music duo

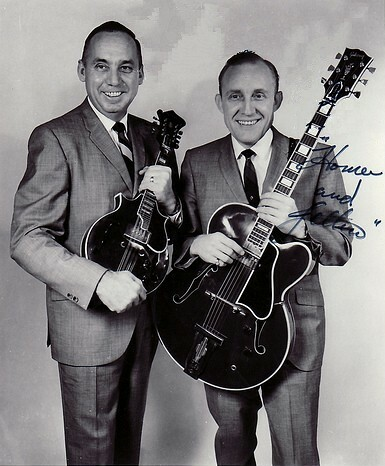
- Jethro (left) and Homer (right) in the late 1960s

Background information
- Origin: Knoxville, Tennessee, U.S.
- Genres: Country; comedy; parody; hillbilly
- Years active: 1936–1971
- Labels: King, RCA Victor
- Past members: Henry D. Haynes (1936–1971); Kenneth C. Burns (1936–1972); Ken Eidson (1972)

Homer and Jethro were the stage names of American country music duo Henry D. "Homer" Haynes (July 27, 1920 – August 7, 1971) and Kenneth C. "Jethro" Burns (March 10, 1920 – February 4, 1989), popular from the 1940s through the 1960s on radio and television for their satirical versions of popular songs. Known as the Thinking Man's Hillbillies, they received a Grammy Award in 1959 and are members of the Country Music Hall of Fame.

== History ==
=== Early years ===
Haynes and Burns met in 1936 during a WNOX-AM audition in Knoxville, Tennessee, when they were both 16 years old. Known as Junior and Dude (pronounced "dood'-ee"), the pair was rechristened Homer (Haynes) and Jethro (Burns) when WNOX Program Director Lowell Blanchard forgot their nicknames during a 1936 broadcast. In 1939 they became regulars on the Renfro Valley Barn Dance radio program in Renfro Valley, Kentucky.

Haynes and Burns were drafted into the U.S. Army during World War II but served separately; they reunited in Knoxville in 1945, and in 1947 they performed on WLW-AM's Midwestern Hayride in Cincinnati. They sang exaggerated hillbilly-styled versions of pop standards as their comedic hook, with Haynes on guitar and Burns on mandolin. They originally recorded for King Records, where they also worked as session musicians backing other artists such as Moon Mullican until a dispute over song credits with label owner Syd Nathan led Nathan to release them from the label. The duo and other stars were fired by new management at WLW in 1948, and after a brief tour, they moved to Springfield, Missouri and performed on KWTO-AM with Chet Atkins, the Carter Family and Slim Wilson.

=== Song satirists ===
Signed to RCA Victor in 1949, the label's country A&R man Steve Sholes suggested they switch their comedy to singing parodies of country and pop hits. Most were penned by Burns, the humorist of the pair. Their parody of "Baby It's Cold Outside", as recorded with June Carter, became a hit. The song's composer, Frank Loesser, gave them permission to parody the tune with the condition that the label read, "With apologies to Frank Loesser". It led to an appearance on WLS-AM in Chicago in 1950, a tour with musical satirist Spike Jones, and a guest appearance on Jones's RCA Victor recording of "Pal-Yat-Chee", an opera parody. A number of successful recordings also followed. Haynes and Burns were gifted jazz players, both of them followers of the music of Django Reinhardt. They also served as backup musicians on a number of late 1940s and early 1950s RCA Victor recordings by Chet Atkins and on many other RCA Victor country sessions in Chicago and Nashville. The Atkins recordings featuring the duo reflect their mutual admiration for Reinhardt. Atkins was married to Burns' wife's sister.

Taking a cue from other comic talents of the era, most of their humor was directed inward, towards themselves. In several notable exchanges recorded on the live album At the Country Club, they josh that the parade to be given by their fan club had to be canceled because one of the members was ill, and the other had to work. Indeed, from the opening introduction, by Hee Haw stalwart Archie Campbell, the humor is towards them rather than at others. Campbell's intro noted, "Ladies and gentlemen, due to circumstances beyond our control, the next act showed up." At one point in the evening, Burns remarked to one of the patrons, "Hey, you walking out! Get back in here, you're no better than the rest of them." However, taking a moment to imprint their serious musical talent, they and the other members of the band perform "C-Jam Blues", to the delight of the audience. Burns was also a talented guitarist, able to replicate the hot soloing he did on mandolin on the guitar.

They won a Grammy Award for Best Comedy Performance – Musical in 1959 for "The Battle of Kookamonga", their parody of Johnny Horton's hit "The Battle of New Orleans". The majority of their recordings were similar parodies of famous old and new popular songs. One example was their treatment of the old romantic song "When You Wore a Tulip" (When you wore a Tulip/A sweet yellow tulip/and I wore a big red rose). While keeping that line of the chorus intact, the duo's version of its verse told of two lovers sleeping in a greenhouse, removing their clothes due to the heat and humidity, and then having to escape when the building caught fire. To cover their nakedness, the couple wore the flowers.

In the 1960s, they also recorded a parody version of Lennon and McCartney's "I Want to Hold Your Hand".

=== Later years ===
Over time, Homer and Jethro's patter became more sophisticated, giving them access to mainstream audiences on network television and in Las Vegas. On May 12, 1960, they appeared with Johnny Cash on NBC's The Ford Show, Starring Tennessee Ernie Ford. In the 1960s they were hired as commercial personalities for Kellogg's Corn Flakes; their "Ooh! That's corny!" television spots gave them exposure beyond country music audiences.

Homer and Jethro made several appearances on The Johnny Cash Show during the 1970–1971 season, though they were not considered regulars. During one appearance, they reprised their old hit "Baby, It's Cold Outside" with June Carter Cash as part of a skit.

Both were also established jazz musicians, who were deeply influenced by the string jazz of European gypsy-born Django Reinhardt. Atkins produced many of their later RCA albums including two instrumental jazz efforts: Playing It Straight and It Ain't Necessarily Square. The Reinhardt style continued to influence the duo's work until Haynes' death from a heart attack in 1971. A final RCA Victor album, The Far-Out World of Homer and Jethro, followed in 1972 and the sleeve included a message from Burns playing tribute to Haynes.

After Haynes' passing, Burns tried to maintain the duo with a new "Homer", guitarist Ken Eidson, but the effort was short-lived. Burns continued recording and performing solo and with Chicago folk singer Steve Goodman. Burns died in 1989 from prostate cancer. Ken Eidson died from cancer in 1999 at age 51.

Haynes and Burns were inducted into the Country Music Hall of Fame in 2001.

== Partial RCA Victor album discography ==
- Homer and Jethro Fracture Frank Loesser (1953)
- Barefoot Ballads (1957)
- The Worst of Homer and Jethro (1958)
- Life Can be Miserable (1959)
- At the Country Club (1960) (recorded live in 1959)
- Songs My Mother Never Sang (1961)
- At the Convention (1962)
- Playing It Straight (1962) (reissued on CD by RCA Japan) [jazz instrumentals]
- Zany Songs of the '30s (1963)
- Homer and Jethro Go West (1963)
- Ooh, That's Corny (1963)
- Cornfucius Say (1964)
- Fractured Folk Songs (1964)
- Tenderly (1965)
- Old Crusty Minstrels (1965)
- Wanted for Murder (1966)
- Any News from Nashville? (1966)
- Something Stupid (1967)
- Songs for the Out Crowd (1967)
- It Ain't Necessarily Square [jazz instrumentals]
- Nashville Cats (1967)
- There's Nothing Like An Old Hippie (1968)
- Live at Vanderbilt U (1968)
- Cool Crazy Christmas (1968)
- Homer and Jethro's Next Album (1969)
- The Far-Out World of Homer and Jethro (1972)

=== with the Nashville String Band ===
- The Nashville String Band
- Down Home
- Strung Up
- Identified!
- The Bandit
- World's Greatest Melodies

=== Select singles ===
Year	Single	Peak positions	
Year	Single	U.S. Country	U.S.
1949	"I Feel That Old Age Creeping On"	14	—
1949	"Baby, It's Cold Outside" (with June Carter)	9	22
1949	"Tennessee Border—No. 2"	14	—
1953	"(How Much Is) That Hound Dog in the Window"	2	17
1954	"Hernando's Hideaway"	14	—
1955	"Sifting, Whimpering Sands"/"They Laid Him in the Ground"	—	—
1959	"The Battle of Kookamonga"	26	14
1960	"Please Help Me, I'm Falling"	—	101
1964	"I Want to Hold Your Hand"	49	—

=== Guest singles ===
Year	Single	Artist	U.S. Country
1967	"Chet's Tune"	Some of Chet's Friends	38
