= The Greencards =

American progressive bluegrass band

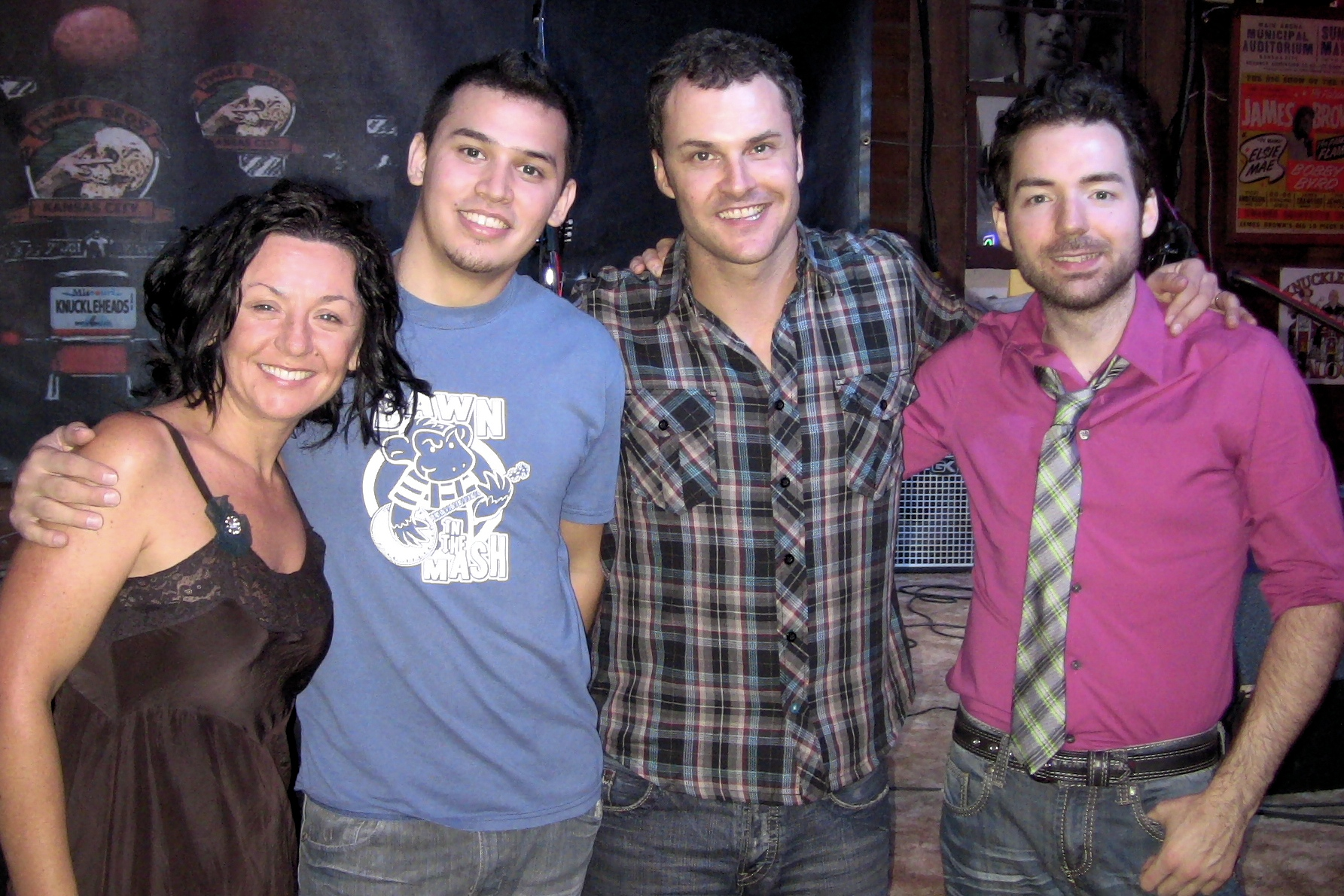
- The Greencards at Knuckleheads Saloon in Kansas City, Missouri

Background information
- Origin: Austin, Texas, U.S.
- Genres: Bluegrass, progressive bluegrass
- Years active: 2003–2014
- Labels: Dualtone, Sugar Hill
- Members: Carol Young; Kym Warner; Carl Miner; Luke Bulla
- Past members: Eamon McLoughlin; Jake Stargel; Tyler Andal
- Website: www.thegreencards.com

The Greencards are an American progressive bluegrass band that formed in 2003 in Austin, Texas, and relocated in 2005 to Nashville, Tennessee. The band was founded by Englishman Eamon McLoughlin and Australians Kym Warner and Carol Young. The musicians originally performed in local Austin bars, and soon found increasing acclaim. They released one independent album, Movin' On, in 2003, and two albums, Weather and Water and Viridian, on the Dualtone record label. Their fourth album, Fascination, was released on Sugar Hill in 2009. Their fifth album, The Brick Album (2011), was self-produced with the direct support of their fans. Pre-production donors were recognized with their names inscribed on the "bricks" that make up the cover art.

Their debut album, Movin' On, was the recipient of local Texas awards and charted on Americana radio stations. Country Music Television named their follow-up, Weather and Water, as one of the ten best bluegrass albums of 2005, and The Greencards were invited to tour with Bob Dylan and Willie Nelson in the same year. Viridian would go on to take the number one position on Billboard magazine's Bluegrass Music Chart, making the Greencards the first international band to do so. Viridian was a critically praised album, and was nominated for Best Country Album by the Australian Recording Industry Association. The track "Mucky the Duck" from Viridian was nominated for Best Country Instrumental Performance at the 50th Grammy Awards.

The Greencards are noted for their incorporation of other genres of music within an American bluegrass sound. Often labeled as part of, and said to be representative of, the "newgrass" movement, they draw from Irish folk music, gypsy music, rock 'n' roll, folk balladry, and Latin American musical sources. The Greencards' sound has been compared to progressive American folk rock, and they have been credited with helping to expand bluegrass music.

Eamon McLoughlin left the band in December 2009, and resides in Nashville. Carl Miner, originally from Oregon, joined the group in May 2010, playing acoustic guitar. Miner won the 1999 National Flatpicking Championship at the Walnut Valley Festival, and he resides in Nashville.

== History ==
=== Formation ===
The Greencards were initially composed of two Australians, Kym Warner on mandolin and Carol Young on bass, and an Englishman, Eamon McLoughlin on fiddle. Raised in South London, McLoughlin began to perform country music shows with his family on weekends, influenced by George Jones, George Strait, and Ricky Skaggs. Born to Irish parents, McLoughlin's father was head of a London-based country band. At age nine, McLoughlin moved away from piano lessons to play fiddle, and performed with his father's band. McLoughlin had earlier relocated from Brighton to Austin in 1997, after leaving the University of Sussex with a degree in Politics and American Studies. Trained in London studying Royal Schools of Music Grades before emigrating, McLoughlin also toured with the Asylum Street Spankers, Austin Lounge Lizards, Bruce Robison and Ray Wylie Hubbard after arriving in the United States.

Prior to the founding of The Greencards, Young won the Australian Independent Country Artist of the Year award in 2000, and had recorded two No. 1 Australian-charted country music singles. Young was a singer in Outback country bands and acts, including Gina Jeffreys. Young was previously nominated as "Best Female Vocalist" by the Country Music Association of Australia, and won the Australian independent country artist of the year award in 2000 due in part to her No. 1 singles "True Blue Fool" and "Part of the Past".

Warner was an aspiring bluegrass musician (which was unusual in Australia) after learning of the music from his father, an early Australian bluegrass pioneer. The winner of the Australian National Bluegrass Mandolin Championship for four consecutive years, Warner had toured with country music artists including Gina Jeffreys, and with Young in Kasey Chambers's band. Young and Warner knew each other previously, and according to Warner, had been drawn to bluegrass and American roots music through an appreciation of George Jones and Merle Haggard. Warner and Young made the decision to emigrate to America to pursue musical careers in that country, after they met. Young and Warner later lived together in Sydney while trying to find work in the moribund Australian bluegrass scene. After leaving Australia, they spent time in West Texas before relocating to Austin.

On an early trip the pair took to Austin, Warner and Young met McLoughlin at a recording session. Warner was producing an album for the recording artist Bill Atkins and found they needed a fiddle player, which led to the recruitment of McLoughlin. Initially the immigrants came to know one another through their mutual love of Monty Python, Benny Hill, and Fawlty Towers. They began to have jam sessions afterwards and there was evident chemistry between the trio, which led to their writing songs together. They named themselves The Greencards in honor of the fact that all three band members carried United States green cards. They eventually began to perform shows locally in Austin to finance the recording of what would become their debut album, 2003's Movin' On. In the process, they became one of the most popular musical groups in Austin. Representative of an emerging "newgrass" movement, the Greencards' acoustic sound was said to incorporate eclectic influences from Irish traditional, Romani gypsy, and Latin American musical sources.

Their first performance together as a band was at the Austin Irish pub Mother Egan's. Given a noon to 3 pm time slot, they began to fill the pub with patrons week after week. Their fans at Mother Egan's soon began calling them the "Bluegrass Bunch". Several months later, The Greencards began performing an additional three to five times per week in Austin, in addition to their Mother Egan's Sunday show. Warner credited the frantic pace of their performance schedule during their Austin formation to their cohesion as a group and with driving them to create more new original music. During their time performing locally in Austin, they toured with various local Texas musicians, including Robert Earl Keen. Warner said that during their early career performing together, audiences would always assume they were American musicians until they finally spoke between songs, revealing their English and Australian accents.

Mario Tarradell of WFAA-TV news called the idea of an American bluegrass band composed of two Australians and an Englishman not as "outrageous" as it may seem. He quoted McLoughlin in an interview:

The ironic thing is that we grew up listening to primarily American music and fell in love with American music. I love country music. I grew up with George Jones and Charley Pride and Jim Reeves. All that stuff was playing in the house. That's what I wanted to seek out. That's what I wanted to play. Carol was into Tammy Wynette. Trev Warner is Kym's dad, and he was the first person to bring bluegrass music to Australia.

=== Movin' On (2003–2004) ===
"Movin' On"
Sample of "Movin' On", the title track of the 2003 album Movin' On. The song is a typical example of their "jam band" sound from this time period.

In 2003, The Greencards recorded and self-released Movin' On, their debut album, which sold 10,000 copies at shows and online, and entered the top five on the Americana radio charts. Pat Flynn, one of the band members of the New Grass Revival, guested on the recording of Movin' On as a session guitarist, and would return to do so again on Weather and Water. The album was said to break past traditional rules of bluegrass music by integrating a jam-band mindset while blending classical folk balladry and rock 'n' roll into the sound. Contrasting with that appraisal, the album was also cited as a traditional and successful "lo-fi" approach to bluegrass music. Critics noted the virtuoso solos on mandolin, fiddle, and guitar on Movin' On.

The Greencards gained more fans and became known by name quickly after the release of Movin' On. The band was credited with performing the most energetic sets during the course of the 2004 Austin City Limits Music Festival, were said to bring a global sound to bluegrass, and—by drawing on influences such as Bob Dylan and The Beatles—were pushing the genre's boundaries. Their live show during this period was ranked by the Houston Chronicle in the top five nights of live music for the year in 2004.

Movin' On earned The Greencards the 2004 Austin Music Award for Best New Band. Several months after the awards, the band was signed by Dualtone Records and began work on their next album, Weather and Water. The label re-released Movin' On at the beginning of 2005, generating still more airplay and sales.

=== Weather and Water (2005–2006) ===
Their second Dualtone album, Weather and Water, was released on June 28, 2005. Warner stated that during the recording sessions, Dualtone Records let them record what they wanted, with no interference or changes requested. In a review of Weather and Water in The Washington Post, it was noted that on this album, unlike their debut, the focus was on the music supporting lyrics, rather than the blues virtuosity of Movin' On. All three members of the band sang on Weather and Water, but Young's voice was noted for its "dreamy, haunting quality". Their music through the Weather and Water album had been called Celtic-influenced and bluegrass-flavored by John Lehndorff of the Rocky Mountain News, but he noted that the band had a distinctly American sound despite their overseas origins. In early 2005, The Greencards performed at South by Southwest in Austin for the first time, and afterwards made their debut at the prestigious MerleFest.

"Time"
Sample of "Time", a single released in 2005 from the album Weather and Water. "Time" was called the 'centerpiece' of the Weather and Water album.

Jason Gonulsen of Glide Magazine noted that The Greencards' debut Movin' On did not capture the band's live energy, but that Weather and Water overcame this, and was one of 2005's best bluegrass albums. The music video for the band's single "Time" from Weather and Water received heavy airplay and rotation on Country Music Television. "Time" was described as the centerpiece track of Weather and Water. Weather and Water was also cited as expanding the boundaries of the bluegrass genre.

Country Music Television named Weather and Water one of its ten favorite bluegrass albums of the year, saying, "At the nexus of bluegrass, country and pop, this charming trio immediately win over such diverse audiences in concert. Luckily, their winning personality translates to this disc—even with several melancholy, yet melodic, songs. Not for nothing did Bob Dylan and Willie Nelson choose them to open their summer tour of minor league ballparks." The Greencards were the opening act for Dylan and Nelson on their 2005 summer tour. Kym Warner credits Gary Paczosa, an engineer who worked on Weather and Water, with helping them get the opportunity to tour with Dylan and Nelson. Paczosa had previously served as an engineer on recordings for Alison Krauss, Nickel Creek and Dolly Parton. "He makes the best-sounding acoustic records in the world", according to Warner. Throughout 2005 they toured extensively with Dylan and Nelson, and afterwards toured with Tommy Emmanuel. During the summer segment of the 2005 tour with Nelson and Dylan, Warner wanted to have the opportunity to pick Dylan's brain about music and performing. However, Warner did not get to spend much time alone with Dylan during their time on the road together. Dylan later told Warner at the end of the tour, "You'll be fine from now on."

At the end of 2005, The Greencards relocated from Austin to Nashville, to be closer to their production company and its staff. Coinciding with their move to Nashville and work on their second album Weather and Water, the changes in location and sound were observed by critics to be a deliberate move from the jam-style of their debut album Movin' On to instead concentrate on Americana-focused music. By 2006, The Greencards had an annual slot at Merlefest, held yearly in Wilkesboro, North Carolina. The band was nominated in the Americana Music Association Awards for 2006 in the category of New/Emerging Artist of the Year, winning the award. In December 2006, their tour van rolled over on a patch of ice after leaving a performance in Bryan, Texas on the way back to Austin, but with no serious injuries.

=== Viridian (2007–2008) ===
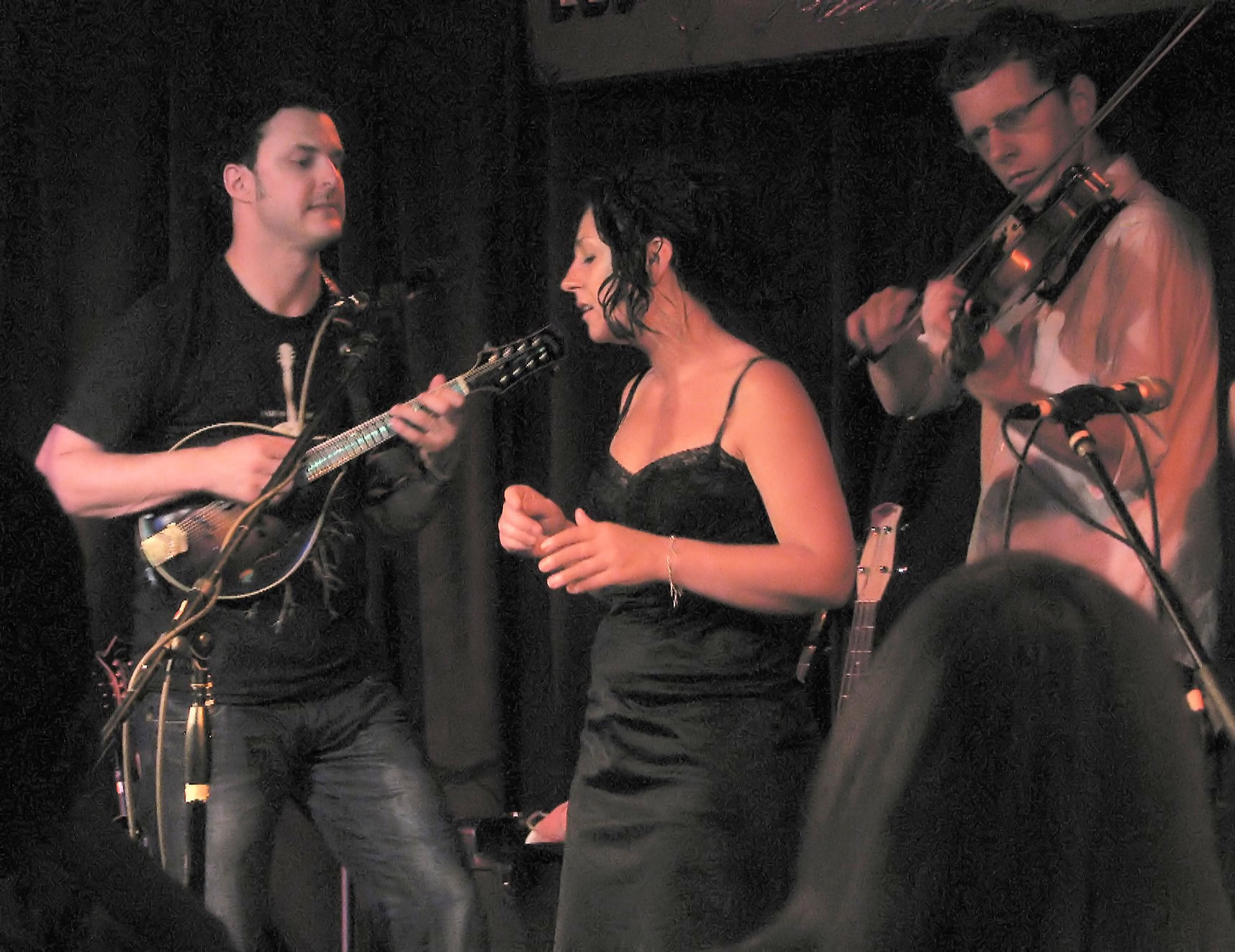
The Greencards performing at The Mucky Duck, the inspiration for their Grammy-nominated song "Mucky the Duck"

On their previous albums, The Greencards had individually recorded their musical tracks separately in isolation booths of recording studios. For Viridian, the band members recorded their album together in real time in an open room, which was said to be a factor in creating a spontaneous feel for some of the album. Most of the songs on Viridian are sung by Young, and all of the tracks were written by The Greencards, with the exception of "Travel On", which was penned by Kim Richey of Nashville. Their sound, through Viridian, was likened to the Canadian alternative country band The Duhks. After its release, Viridian claimed the No. 1 position on Billboard magazine's Bluegrass Music Chart. Doug Lancio, a producer who had previously worked with Patty Griffin, was said to have been a positive factor in the success of Viridian. Prior to the 2007 album, Lancio had not worked with The Greencards. The Greencards are the first international musical act to reach No. 1 on the Bluegrass Music Chart.

In a review of Viridian, Embo Blake of Hybrid Magazine noted Carol Young's vocal skill, as she "effortlessly diphthongs cadence" on the track "Waiting On The Night". According to the WFAA-TV in Dallas/Fort Worth, the album has a traditional bluegrass core, with a worldly flavor. Bruce Elder of The Sydney Morning Herald called Viridian a "tour de force".

In the wake of Viridian, The Greencards have been internationally referred to as one of the most popular Americana musical acts in the United States. Bruce Elder went on to say that the band may, after Viridian, be the best country music performers to ever come out of Australia. In 2007, they were nominated for Best Country Album at the 21st Australian Recording Industry Association awards, ultimately losing to Keith Urban. In December 2007, it was announced that their song "Mucky the Duck" from Viridian was nominated for the Grammy Award for Best Country Instrumental Performance at the 50th Grammy Awards, but it ultimately lost to Brad Paisley's "Throttleneck". Written by Warner, "Mucky the Duck" was inspired by one of the band's favorite Houston musical venues, The Mucky Duck. Eamon McLoughlin is a regular blogger for Country Music Television. After the Grammy Awards, he wrote about the band's experience at the event, noting that despite not winning, the bar had been raised for their next album.

The Greencards announced on their website in August 2008 that they had returned to the studio to record their fourth album with producer Jay Joyce. In September 2008, again via their website, they announced that they signed with Sugar Hill Records for their fourth album, to be released in spring 2009.

=== Fascination (from 2009) ===
On April 21, 2009, The Greencards released their fourth studio album, Fascination. Warner describes the album as "their most focused" work. On their previous albums, the three band members had individually put forward ideas for the music, until enough cohered into the finished work. For Fascination, he says they put aside their individual pride to create a stronger work. The years of touring experience The Greencards have accumulated since their earliest work has helped them, as well. Referring to when they formed the band, he said, "We just played in Austin. We just wrote probably anything, which was the only stuff we knew, which was more of a traditional thing. But since then, we've had five or six years of touring, all of the experiences, all of the people you meet. We've been so fortunate to play at all of these festivals which have a really eclectic form of music styles."

According to Young, the music on Fascination was a progression for the band, and a challenge for them. Comparing their prior work to the new album, she said, "They're probably a bit more bluegrass-influenced than this one here. While we still have the bluegrass and roots music influences, we really wanted to push ourselves harder on this one, something a bit more challenging to play live." She described their music through their fourth album as having evolved, explaining that it began as traditional roots and bluegrass, but after six years is "our own little sound". The track "The Crystal Merchant" was nominated for the Grammy Award for Best Country Instrumental Performance.

In 2009, The Greencards continued to tour, performing again at MerleFest, the Strawberry Park Bluegrass Festival in Preston, Connecticut, Bluegrass in the Park in Henderson, Kentucky, and were on the bill for Lollapalooza.

=== Buy A Brick campaign ===
On November 8, 2010, The Greencards announced that they would self-finance the production on their next album, set for May 2011, rather than taking an advance from a record company. The Buy A Brick campaign is selling a package of an advance copy of the final CD, a digital image of the album artwork, video updates of the recording of the album and the subscriber's name (up to twenty characters) on the album artwork. Subscriptions are either $100 or $200 US with the more expensive package getting the album one week earlier and the subscriber's name on the front of the CD package.

== Musical style and influences ==
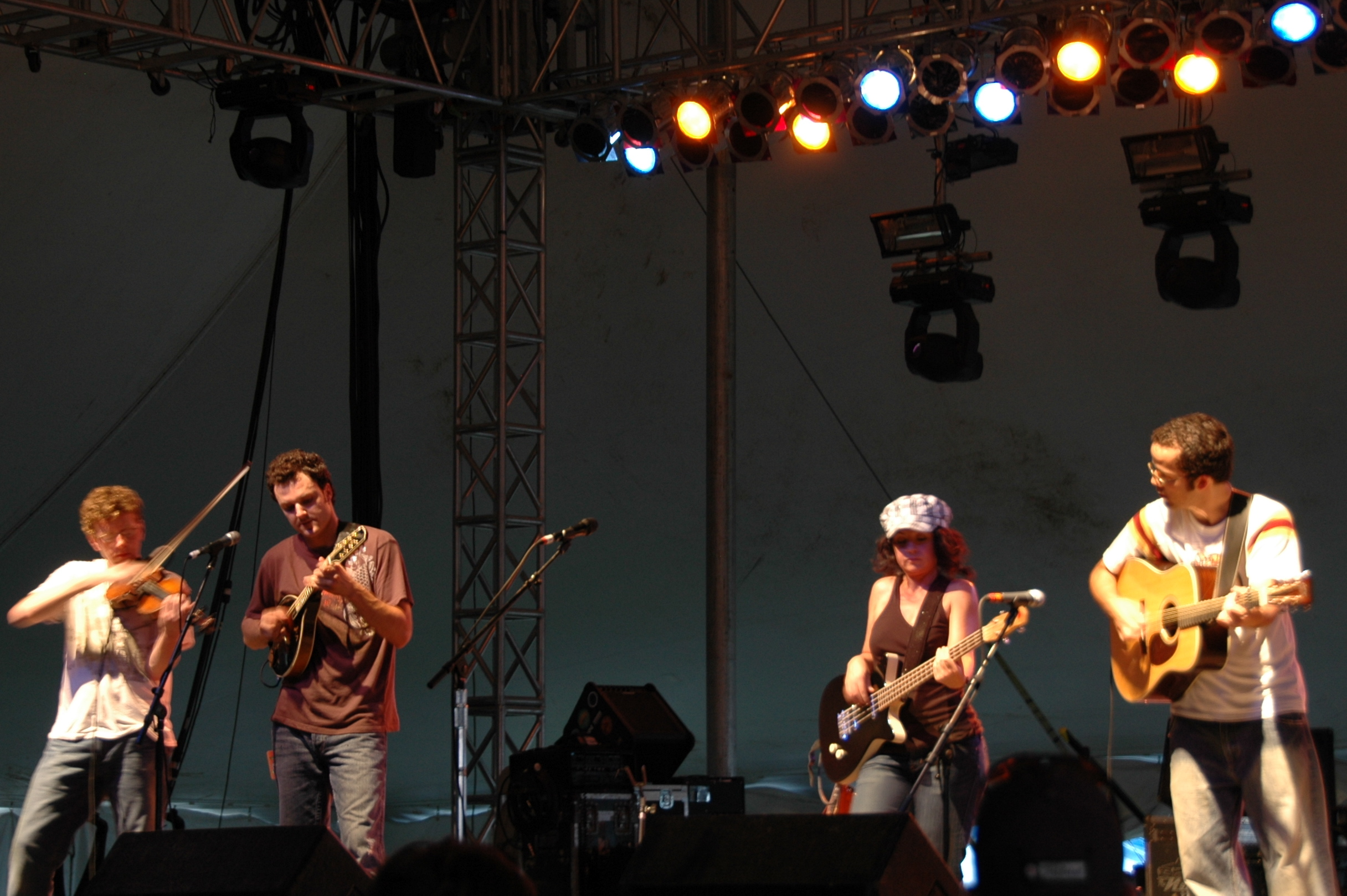
The Greencards in concert in 2007

Considered by critics to be part of the progressive bluegrass ("newgrass") musical school, The Greencards draw from a wide variety of musical influences, ranging from Bob Dylan and the Beatles to the Celtic tone of Irish traditional music, gypsy themes, and Latin sounds. Despite the wide array of influences that shape their music, The Greencards have always maintained a distinctively Americana sound. While the various sounds that influence their work are always detectable, none ever dominate the band's music. Jim Abbott of the Tribune News Service described The Greencards as polished, "earthy, charming roots music with a sophisticated sheen", but noted that some bluegrass purists may miss the vocal idiosyncrasies that can be found on other acts such as the Del McCoury Band. Their appeal has been attributed to both their "instrumental dexterity" as well as the manner in which they both revere and flaunt bluegrass conventions. The progressive nature of The Greencards' bluegrass sound has been compared to Nickel Creek and Alison Krauss & Union Station.

The Greencards' work on Movin' On had a looser, jam-based feeling to it, which they later firmed into a more polished sound after relocating to Nashville from Austin for Weather and Water. John T. Davis in No Depression Magazine stated The Greencards' best work on Weather and Water contained a "stillness", which he felt contrasted with the speed and "frantic" pace of some of the songs on Movin' On. While other critics had mentioned The Greencards in the context of jam bands, Davis went on to say that he felt the band was not one, and that they favored a leaner and "clean" sound driven more by Celtic roots.

During their 2005 tour with Dylan and Nelson, Buzz McClain of The Washington Post believed that The Greencards play traditional American music better than some Americans do, because of their deep respect for bluegrass and the Americana sound. According to David McPherson in Bluegrass Unlimited magazine, the band's three-part harmonies evoke the soul sounds of gospel music. Kym Warner has said that Robert Earl Keen, Kelly Willis, and Patty Griffin were key influences musically in The Greencards's sound during their time in Austin, with the previously unreleased Griffin song "What You Are" being covered on their album Weather and Water. The recordings on Viridian, in particular the songs "River of Sand", "Waiting on the Night" and "When I Was in Love With You", were said to evoke the sounds of progressive folk rock that emerged in the 1960s. In Nashville Scene, Edd Hurt noted the eclectic tone of the band's overall body of recordings, and believed that their albums belonged to the tradition of singer-songwriter musicians.

Their musical appeal to fans has been attributed to both their "instrumental dexterity" as well as the manner in which they both revere and flaunt bluegrass conventions. Naila Francis described The Greencards's sound as having a mellow tone, with "tender ballards and yarns" in their songs, but punctuated by bursts of energetic musical restlessness. Country Music Television in particular noted their melancholy but melodic sound. The Greencards have described their sound as "high energy acoustic music".

== Discography ==
Title	Details	Peak chart positions
Title	Details	US Bluegrass
Movin' On	Release date: 2003; Label: Dualtone Records	10
Weather and Water	Release date: June 2005; Label: Dualtone Records	3
Viridian	Release date: March 2007; Label: Dualtone Records	1
Fascination	Release date: April 2009; Label: Sugar Hill Records	—
The Brick Album	Release date: June 2011; Label: Darling Street Records	8
Sweetheart of the Sun	Release date: August 2013; Label: Darling Street Records	—
"—" denotes releases that did not chart

== Awards and nominations ==
=== ARIA Music Awards ===
The ARIA Music Awards are a set of annual ceremonies presented by Australian Recording Industry Association (ARIA), which recognise excellence, innovation, and achievement across all genres of the music of Australia. They commenced in 1987.

Year	Nominee / work	Award	Result	Ref.
2007	Veridian	Best Country Album	Nominated	

Awards
Preceded by Mary Gauthier	AMA New/Emerging Artist of the Year; 2006	Succeeded by The Avett Brothers
