= Henry D. "Homer" Haynes =

American guitarist and comic singer (1920–1971)

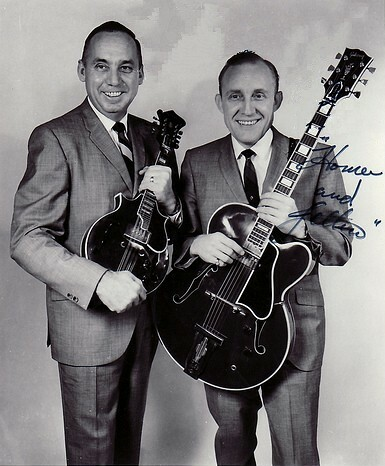
- Haynes (right) with Kenneth Burns as "Homer and Jethro", 1967

Background information
- Also known as: Homer
- Born: Henry Doyle Haynes; July 27, 1920 near Knoxville, Tennessee, U.S.
- Died: August 7, 1971 (aged 51) Hammond, Indiana
- Genres: Country; jazz; comedy
- Instrument: Guitar
- Years active: 1936–Present
- Labels: King, RCA
- Formerly of: Homer and Jethro (with Kenneth C. Burns)

Henry Doyle Haynes (born July 27, 1920 – August 7, 1971) was an American comedy entertainer and musician who gained fame on radio and television as a country and jazz guitarist and as the character Homer of the country music comedy and parody duo Homer and Jethro with Kenneth C. Burns for 35 years beginning in 1936.

== Biography ==
Haynes was born near Knoxville, Tennessee, on July 27, 1920. He met Kenneth Burns during a WNOX-AM audition in 1936 when they were both 16 years old. Haynes strummed the guitar and Burns played the mandolin. Known as Junior and Dude (pronounced "dood'-ee"), the duo was rechristened Homer and Jethro when WNOX Program Director Lowell Blanchard forgot their nicknames during a 1936 broadcast. In 1939 they became regulars on the Renfro Valley Barn Dance radio program.

Haynes was drafted into the US Army and served in the medical corps in the Pacific. He reunited in Knoxville in 1945 with Burns, who had served in Europe. In 1947, the duo moved to Cincinnati, Ohio and were working at WLW-AM on the station's Midwestern Hayride. They signed with King Records, where they worked as a house band and recorded singles on their own, and two years later signed with RCA Records. The pair was fired along with several other stars by new management at WLW in 1948 and, after a brief tour, they moved to Springfield, Missouri and performed on KWTO-AM with Chet Atkins, the Carter Family and Slim Wilson.

In 1949 they moved to Chicago and appeared on National Barn Dance on WLS-AM; and later appeared on television programs including Ozark Jubilee, The Beverly Hillbillies, The Johnny Cash Show, The Jimmy Dean Show, and The Tonight Show.

The pair recorded more than 50 albums during their career and won a Grammy for the best comedy performance in 1959 for "The Battle of Kookamonga", a parody of Johnny Horton's "Battle of New Orleans".

Haynes died on August 7, 1971, of a heart attack in Hammond, Indiana. He had lived the last decade of his life just across the state line in Lansing, Illinois. He was buried at Chapel Lawn Memorial Gardens in Schererville, Indiana. He and Burns were inducted into the Country Music Hall of Fame in 2001 as Homer and Jethro.
