= Neck and Neck =

Studio album by Chet Atkins and Mark Knopfler
- Released: October 9, 1990
- Studios: CA Workshop (Nashville); Sound Emporium (Nashville); Hillbilly Heaven, London 1990
- Genres: Country, country rock, western swing
- Length: 38:26
- Label: Columbia
- Producer: Mark Knopfler

Chet Atkins Collaborations chronology
Standard Brands (1981)	Neck and Neck (1990)	Sneakin' Around (1991)

Mark Knopfler chronology
Missing... Presumed Having a Good Time (1989)	Neck and Neck (1990)	Screenplaying (1993)

Neck and Neck is a collaborative album by American guitarist Chet Atkins and British singer-songwriter and guitarist Mark Knopfler, released on October 9, 1990, by Columbia Records. "Poor Boy Blues" was released as a single.

At the 33rd Annual Grammy Awards in 1991, the track "Poor Boy Blues" won Best Country Vocal Collaboration, while the track "So Soft Your Goodbye" won Best Country Instrumental Performance.

Atkins originally recorded "Yakety Axe", a parody of Boots' Randolph's "Yakety Sax", on his 1965 album More of That Guitar Country. This new recording features lyrics and a new arrangement that were composed by Merle Travis. Atkins also previously recorded "I'll See You in My Dreams" on an album with Travis.

The track "There'll Be Some Changes Made" was later included as track 10 of the 15-track 1996 Rolls-Royce Sound System Demonstration Disc and accompanying cassette.

== Critical reception ==
In his review for AllMusic, Stephen Thomas Erlewine gave the album four out of five stars, calling it "the most focused and arguably the most rewarding record Atkins has released." Erlewine singled out Knopfler's influence on the guitarist:

Working with Dire Straits guitarist Mark Knopfler had a rejuvenating influence on Chet Atkins. Knopfler has Atkins moving toward his country roots, but both guitarists still play with a tasteful, jazzy sensibility—however, Atkins has abandoned the overt jazz fusion pretensions that sank most of his '80s records.

Professional ratings
Review scores
Source	Rating
AllMusic	4/5 stars

== Track listing ==
No.	Title	Writer(s)	Length
1.	"Poor Boy Blues"	Paul Kennerley	4:01
2.	"Sweet Dreams"	Don Gibson	3:24
3.	"There'll Be Some Changes Made"	William Blackstone, Benton Overstreet (Note: Parody lyrics were written by Margaret Archer, Chet Atkins, and Mark Knopfler.)	6:28
4.	"Just One Time"	Don Gibson	4:11
5.	"So Soft, Your Goodbye"	Randy Goodrum	3:16
6.	"Yakety Axe"	Boots Randolph, James Rich, Merle Travis	3:24
7.	"Tears"	Stéphane Grappelli, Django Reinhardt	3:54
8.	"Tahitian Skies"	Ray Flacke	3:18
9.	"I'll See You in My Dreams"	Isham Jones, Gus Kahn	2:59
10.	"The Next Time I'm in Town"	Mark Knopfler	3:21
Total length:			38:26

== Personnel ==
Music

- Chet Atkins – guitar, vocals
- Mark Knopfler – guitar, vocals
- Larrie Londin – drums
- Guy Fletcher – drums, bass, keyboards
- Edgar Meyer – bass
- Steve Wariner – bass
- Mark O'Connor – fiddle, mandolin
- Paul Franklin – steel guitar, pedabro, Dobro
- Floyd Cramer – piano (track 2)
- Vince Gill – backing vocals

Production

- Mark Knopfler – producer
- Mike Poston – engineer
- Guy Fletcher – engineer
- Vanelle – assistance engineer
- Ron Eve – assistance engineer
- Bill Schnee – mixing engineer
- Doug Sax – mastering at The Mastering Lab in Los Angeles
- Alan Yoshida – mastering at The Mastering Lab in Los Angeles
- Deborah Feingold – photography

== Charts ==
=== Albums ===
Chart (1990)	Peak
Canadian Albums Chart	71
Norway Albums Chart	5
Sweden Albums Chart	8
Swiss Albums Chart	3
UK Albums Chart	41
US Billboard 200 Chart	127
US Billboard Top Country Chart	27

=== Singles ===
Year	Single	Peak positions
Year	Single	CAN Country
1990	"Poor Boy Blues"	92
