= Lowell Blanchard =

American radio personality

Lowell Blanchard (November 5, 1910 – February 19, 1968) was an American radio presenter and performer. Blanchard, a native of Chicago, Illinois, was a station manager and popular show host for WNOX-AM Radio in Knoxville, Tennessee. He was inducted into The Country Music On-Air Personality Hall of Fame in 1977. He is said to have given country performers Henry D. Haynes and Kenneth C. Burns their stage names, Homer and Jethro, after forgetting their stage names during a 1936 broadcast on WNOX.

In April 1950, Blanchard and the Valley Trio recorded a version of the song "Jesus Hits Like an Atom Bomb", which was included on the Atomic Platters: Cold War Music from the Golden Age compilation.
