= Chet, Floyd & Boots =

Studio album by Chet Atkins, Floyd Cramer and Boots Randolph
- Released: 1971
- Recorded: Nashville, Tennessee
- Genre: Country
- Length: 21:49
- Label: RCA Camden
- Producer: Ethel Gabriel

Chet Atkins chronology
For the Good Times (1971)	Chet, Floyd & Boots (1971)	Identified! (1971)

Chet Atkins Collaborations chronology
Strung Up (1971)	Chet Floyd & Boots (1971)	Identified! (1971)

Chet, Floyd & Boots is a studio album by American guitarist Chet Atkins, pianist Floyd Cramer and saxophone player Boots Randolph. Boots had a novelty hit with Yakety Sax which Chet covered, playing the saxophone lead on guitar, as Yakety Axe - which also became a hit. Cramer was a regular session musician at the Nashville studios, playing with a multitude of artists including Elvis Presley and Brenda Lee, helping to define the "Nashville Sound" that Atkins had also helped develop. The trio briefly toured together.

Chet, Floyd & Boots was originally released on RCA's budget label, RCA Camden. The album was later reissued on the Pickwick label and re-released on compact disc in 1992 on RCA Camden.

Professional ratings
Review scores
Source	Rating
Allmusic	2/5 stars

== Track listing ==
=== Side one ===
1. "Hot Mocking Bird" – 2:07 (Chet)
2. "Piano Rock Roll" – 2:11 (Floyd)
3. "Big Daddy" (John D. Loudermilk) – 2:03 (Boots)
4. "Oh, Lonesome Me" (Don Gibson) – 2:17 (Chet)
5. "Georgia on My Mind" (Stuart Gorrell, Hoagy Carmichael) – 3:41 (Floyd)

=== Side two ===
1. "Yakety Sax" (Randolph, James Rich) – 1:57 (Boots)
2. "From Nashville with Love" (John D. Loudermilk) – 2:41 (Chet)
3. "Cast Your Fate to the Wind" (Vince Guaraldi) – 2:35 (Floyd)
4. "Temptation" – 2:20 (Boots)

== Personnel ==
- Chet Atkins – guitar
- Floyd Cramer – piano
- Boots Randolph – saxophone

Production

- Ethel Gabriel – producer
- Bob Simpson – remastering

== See also ==
- The Nashville A-Team
