= For the Good Times (Chet Atkins album) =

For the Good Times (and Other Country Moods)

Studio album by Chet Atkins
- Released: 1971
- Recorded: RCA "Nashville Sound" Studio, Nashville, Tennessee
- Genre: Country, pop, jazz
- Length: 26:18
- Label: RCA Victor
- Producer: Bob Ferguson

Chet Atkins chronology
Strung Up (1971)	For the Good Times (and Other Country Moods) (1971)	Chet Floyd & Boots (1971)

For the Good Times, fully titled For the Good Times (and Other Country Moods), is the forty-second studio album by guitarist Chet Atkins. At the Grammy Awards of 1972, "Snowbird" won the Grammy Award for Best Country Instrumental Performance. The album peaked at number 17 on the Billboard Country Albums charts.

== Track listing ==
=== Side one ===
1. "Snowbird" (Gene MacLellan) – 2:10
2. "Chaplin in New Shoes" (Boudleaux Bryant) – 2:10
3. "Walk Right Back" (Sonny Curtis) – 2:25
4. "Tuck Me to Sleep in My Old Kentucky Home" (Lewis, Young, Meyer) – 2:44
5. "Vesti la giubba (from I Pagliacci)" – 2:33

=== Side two ===
1. "For the Good Times" (Kris Kristofferson) – 3:08
2. "El Cóndor Pasa" (Paul Simon, George Milchberg) – 2:55
3. "Just One Time" (Don Gibson) – 2:40
4. "Together Alone" (Bruce Cockburn) – 3:06
5. "Theme from Love Story" (Francis Lai, Carl Sigman) – 2:27

== Personnel ==
- Chet Atkins – guitar

Production notes

- Al Pachucki – engineer
- Bob Vandevort – engineer
- Roy Shockley – recording technician
- Jimmy Moore – cover photo
