= C. B. Atkins & C. E. Snow by Special Request =

Studio album by C. B. Atkins and C. E. Snow
- Released: 1969
- Recorded: RCA "Nashville Sound" Studio, Nashville, TN
- Genre: Country
- Length: 27:39
- Label: RCA Victor
- Producer: Chet Atkins, Ronnie Light

Chet Atkins chronology
Solid Gold 69 (1969)	C.B. Atkins & C.E. Snow by Special Request (1969)	Chet Atkins Picks on the Pops (1969)

Chet Atkins Collaborations chronology
The Nashville String Band (1969)	C. B. Atkins & C. E. Snow by Special Request (1969)	Chet Atkins Picks on the Pops (1969)

Professional ratings
Review scores
Source	Rating
Allmusic	4/5 stars

C. B. Atkins & C. E. Snow by Special Request, (also known as simply by Special Request), is the title of a recording by Chet Atkins and Hank Snow, released in 1969.

== History ==
Atkins and Snow had a history of collaborations—their first single was "Reminiscing" and they had a hit single in 1955, a guitar duet called "Silver Bell."

Snow was a regular at the Grand Ole Opry and had a long and illustrious entertainment career. Atkins rose from radio and session work to become not only a performing and recording artist and producer, but also an executive at RCA.

Atkins and Snow's previous release Reminiscing and by Special Request are both out of print and have not been re-issued on CD.

== Track listing ==
Side one
No.	Title	Writer(s)	Length
1.	"Limbo Rock"	John Sheldon, Billy Strange	2:50
2.	"Tammy"	Jay Livingston, Ray Evans	2:50
3.	"Wheels"	Norman Petty	2:28
4.	"Everybody Does It in Hawaii"	Jimmie Rodgers, Elsie McWilliams	2:33
5.	"Tiptoeing"	Hank Snow, Chet Atkins	2:16
6.	"Poison Love"	Elmer Laird	3:07

Side two
No.	Title	Writer(s)	Length
7.	"Hold Me Tight"	Johnny Nash	2:39
8.	"Jamaican Farewell"	Irving Burgie	2:19
9.	"I Saw the Light"	Hank Williams	2:01
10.	"The Green Leaves of Summer"	Dimitri Tiomkin	2:32
11.	"Difficult"		2:19

== Personnel ==
- Chet Atkins – guitar, vocals
- Hank Snow – guitar, vocals

Production notes

- Produced by Chet Atkins and Ronnie Light
- Arranged by Bill Walker
- Engineer – Tom Pick
- Recording technician – Leslie Ladd
- Cover photo by Jimmy Moore and Bill Grime
