= The Best of Chet on the Road — Live =

Live album by Chet Atkins
- Released: 1980
- Recorded: Olympia Theatre, Paris, France and Nashville, TN
- Genre: Country
- Label: RCA Victor
- Producer: Chet Atkins, Ray Stevens

Chet Atkins chronology
Reflections (1980)	The Best of Chet on the Road — Live (1980)	Country After All These Years (1981)

Professional ratings
Review scores
Source	Rating
Allmusic	(no review) link

The Best of Chet on the Road — Live is a live album by guitarist Chet Atkins, released by RCA Records in 1980.

== Track listing ==
=== Side one ===
1. "This String" (Coben) – 3:40
2. "Dance With Me" (Johanna Hall - John Hall) – 3:51
3. "Blind Willie" (Kalb) – 3:16
4. "Stars and Stripes Forever" (John Philip Sousa) – 3:28
5. "Medley: Freight Train/Chattanooga Train" (Dadi) – 3:18

=== Side two ===
1. "Wheels" (Torres - Stephens) – 1:52
2. "Blue Angel" (Lima) – 2:07
3. "Recuerdos de la Alhambra" (Atkins) – 3:58
4. "Something/Lady Madonna" (George Harrison/ Lennon & McCartney) – 1:50
5. "When You Wish upon a Star" (Leigh Harline, Ned Washington) – 3:18
6. "Bill Cheatham" (Trad. arr. Atkins - Foster) – 2:56

== Personnel ==
- Chet Atkins – guitar
- Steve Wariner – bass
- Marcel Dadi – guitar
- Jack Williams – bass
- Paul Yandell – guitar
- Terry McMillan – harmonica
- The Cherry Sisters – voices
- Randy Goodrum – string ensemble
- Ray Stevens – piano
- Tony Migliore – piano
- Randy Hauser – drums
- Jerry Carrigan – drums

Production notes

- Ray Stevens – producer ("Blind Willie")
- Bill Harris – engineer
- Charlie Tallent – engineer
- Herb Burnette – art direction, cover photography
- Hope Powell – liner photography

== Chart performance ==
Chart (1980)	Peak position
U.S. Billboard Top Country Albums	43
