= Homer and Jethro Go West =

Studio album by Homer and Jethro
- Released: 1963
- Recorded: Fairmont Hotel, San Francisco
- Genre: Country, Parody
- Label: RCA Victor
- Producer: Chet Atkins

Professional ratings
Review scores
Source	Rating
The Virgin encyclopedia of 50s music (Colin Larkin)	3/5 stars

Homer and Jethro Go West is a studio album released by Homer and Jethro in 1963 on RCA Victor LP record LPM-2674 (mono) and LSP-2674 (stereo). The album cover art is by Jack Davis. The album received renewed publicity in August 1964.

== Track listing ==
No.	Title	Writer(s)	Length
1.	"Joe Bean"	Freeman - Pober
2.	"That Darling Still of Mine"	Cy Coben
3.	"Ol’ Paint"	Coben
4.	"Roll On Deodorant, Roll On"	Stewart
5.	"Oh Give Me a Home"	Coben
6.	"Whoopee Ti Yi Yo"	Homer and Jethro
7.	"El Paso"	Robbins
8.	"Freda on the Freeway"	Bowman
9.	"Streets of Weehawken"	Homer and Jethro
10.	"Down in the Alley"	Coben
11.	"Oh Top Forty"	Coben
12.	"I’ve Got No Use for the Women"	Homer and Jethro
