= Work It Out with Chet Atkins C.G.P. =

Work It Out With Chet Atkins C.G.P.

Studio album by Chet Atkins
- Released: 1983
- Genre: Country, jazz, pop
- Label: Columbia, CBS
- Producer: Randy Goodrum

Chet Atkins chronology
East Tennessee Christmas (1983)	Work It Out With Chet Atkins C.G.P. (1983)	Stay Tuned (1985)

Work It Out With Chet Atkins C.G.P. is the fiftieth studio album by Chet Atkins. After recording for RCA Victor since 1947, Chet left the label to join Columbia. This release is background music for exercising. He was nominated for the 1984 Best Country & Western Instrumental Performance Grammy award for "Tara's Theme" but did not win. It peaked at No. 64 on the Billboard Country Albums charts.

== Reception ==
Professional ratings
Review scores
Source	Rating
Allmusic	3/5 stars

Writing for Allmusic, critic Richard S. Ginell wrote of the album "Some of the song choices are as corny as all get out... but the performances are dignified, musical, definitely not throwaways... A most unpretentious, even likeable Columbia debut for Atkins..."

== Track listing ==
1. "Warm up Medley: Grandfather’s Clock/Jubilo/Swanee River/Humoresque"
2. "Walk Me Home"
3. "Strolling Medley: Bicycle Built for Two/Farewell Blues/Bye Bye Blues"
4. "Bouree " (Bach)
5. "Streakin’ Medley "
6. "Tara’s Theme"
7. "Cross Country Medley: Take Me Home, Country Roads/Jersey Bounce/"
8. "Run, Don’t Walk" (Smith)
9. "Harlequin Romance"

== Personnel ==
- Chet Atkins – guitar
- David Hungate – bass
- Randy Goodrum – keyboards

== Chart performance ==
Chart (1983)	Peak position
U.S. Billboard Top Country Albums	64
