= Picks on the Hits =

Studio album by Chet Atkins
- Released: 1972
- Genres: Country, pop
- Length: 27:48
- Label: RCA Victor

Chet Atkins chronology
Identified! (1971)	Picks on the Hits (1972)	The Bandit (1972)

Alternative Cover

Picks on the Hits is the forty-third studio album by guitarist Chet Atkins, released in 1972. It was nominated for the 1972 Grammy Award for Best Country Instrumental Performance but did not win. Chet's duet release with Jerry Reed Me & Chet was also nominated in the same category.

== Reissues ==
- Picks on the Hits was reissued on CD along with Superpickers in 1998
- The CD reissue by Pair Records adds eight additional tracks from Picks the Best and leaves off "I'd Like to Teach the World to Sing" and "Me and Julio Down by the Schoolyard".

== Track listing ==
1. "The Masterpiece" (Jean-Joseph Mouret, Paul Parnes) – 2:33
2. "After Midnight" (J. J. Cale) – 2:53
3. "Song Sung Blue" (Neil Diamond) – 3:03
4. "An Old Fashioned Love Song" (Paul Williams) – 2:30
5. "Amazing Grace" (John Newton) – 2:30
6. "Sweet Caroline" (Diamond)
7. "I'd Like to Teach the World to Sing (In Perfect Harmony)" (Roger Cook, Roger Greenaway, Bill Backer, Billy Davis) – 2:19
8. "Vincent" (Don McLean) – 3:22
9. "Godfather (Theme)" (Nino Rota, Larry Kusic) – 2:54
10. "Me and Julio Down by the Schoolyard" (Paul Simon) – 2:29
  Pair CD reissue additional tracks:
11. "You'll Never Walk Alone" (Richard Rodgers, Oscar Hammerstein II)
12. "Lovely Weather" (Natalicio Lima)
13. "Insensatez (How Insensitive)" (Antônio Carlos Jobim)
14. "Colonel Bogey" (F. J. Ricketts)
15. "Anna (El Negro Zumbón)" (Armando Trovaioli)
16. "Battle Hymn of the Republic" (Julia Ward Howe)
17. "El Paso" (Marty Robbins)
18. "Ay Ay Ay"

== Personnel ==
- Chet Atkins – guitar
