= Country After All These Years =

- Original LP cover

Studio album by Chet Atkins
- Released: 1981
- Genre: Country
- Label: RCA Victor

Chet Atkins chronology
The Best of Chet on the Road — Live (1980)	Country After All These Years (1981)	Standard Brands (1981)

Country After All These Years is a studio album by guitarist Chet Atkins. It would be his last recording for RCA Victor after 35 years with the label, and as a fitting parting gift, the album won the 1982 Grammy Award for Best Country Instrumental Performance. Chet was also nominated in the same category that year for Reflections, his collaboration with Doc Watson.

== Track listing ==
Side one

1. "Orange Blossom Special" (Ervin Rouse, Robert Wise)
2. "Ready for the Times to Get Better" (Reynolds)
3. "On the Road Again" (Willie Nelson)
4. "Storms Never Last" (Colter)
5. "Wildwood Flower" (Carter)

Side two

1. "Heart of Glass" (Deborah Harry, Chris Stein)
2. "Sugar Bush"
3. "Let 'Em In" (Paul McCartney)
4. "I Can Hear Kentucky Calling Me"

== Personnel ==
- Chet Atkins – guitar
