= Solid Gold 69 =

Studio album by Chet Atkins
- Released: 1969
- Genres: Country, pop
- Label: RCA Victor LSP-4244 (Stereo)
- Producer: Bob Ferguson

Chet Atkins chronology
| The Nashville String Band (1969) | Solid Gold 69 (1969) | C.B. Atkins & C.E. Snow by Special Request (1969) |

Solid Gold 69 is the thirty-eighth studio album by American guitarist Chet Atkins, released in 1969.

The liner notes were written by Donovan.

== Reception ==
Professional ratings
Review scores
| Source | Rating |
|---|---|
| Allmusic | 2/5 stars |

The album was a moderate commercial success, entering the US Pop Album charts on December 13, 1969. It stayed on the chart for 7 weeks and peaked at No. 150.

At the Grammy Awards of 1970, Solid Gold 69 was nominated for the Grammy Award for Best Country Instrumental Performance.

Writing for Allmusic, critic Richard S. Ginell wrote of the album "Only completists who must hear everything need search for this."

== Track listing ==
=== Side one ===
1. "Both Sides Now" (Joni Mitchell)
2. "Son of a Preacher Man" (John Hurley, Ronnie Wilkins)
3. "My Way" (Claude François, Jacques Revaux, Paul Anka)
4. "Blackbird" (Lennon–McCartney)
5. "I'll Never Fall in Love Again" (Burt Bacharach, Hal David)
6. "So What's New?" (Lee, Pisano)

=== Side two ===
1. "Folsom Prison Blues" (Johnny Cash)
2. "Jean"
3. "Love Theme from Romeo and Juliet"
4. "Hey Jude" (Lennon–McCartney)
5. "Aquarius" (Galt MacDermot, James Rado, Gerome Ragni)

== Personnel ==
- Chet Atkins – guitar

== Production notes ==
- Produced by Bob Ferguson
- Cover Photo by Howard Cooper
- Liner Photo by Bill Grine
- Sculptor: Marvin Thompson

== Charts ==
| Chart (1969) | Peak position |
|---|---|
| US Billboard Top LPs | 150 |
