= Redd Volkaert =

- Born: 6 March 1958 (age 68); Vancouver, BC, Canada
- Occupation: Guitarist
- Instrument: Guitar

Redd Volkaert (born 1958) is a Canadian guitarist and musician. He is widely regarded as one of the greatest guitar players in the modern era and is "among the country’s top Telecaster guitar slingers” particularly in the genres of western swing and honky tonk. He was the go-to picker for Merle Haggard and has a history playing with Johnny Paycheck and George Jones. Volkaert frequently performs in the company of his fellow Telecaster stalwart Bill Kirchen, formerly of Commander Cody and the Lost Planet Airmen. Together, they are often referred to as the "Titans of the Telecaster" due to their ability and notoriety with the instrument.

Volkaert began performing at 16, playing clubs six nights a week until the mid-1980s in Canada. He moved to Los Angeles in 1986. There, he worked clubs and private gigs at night, and gave guitar lessons and recorded during the day. He regularly travelled to Las Vegas to play show rooms and casinos.

Volkaert moved to Nashville in 1990 to play full-time at clubs seven nights a week on Broadway, Printers Alley, and around town. He had one or two shifts a day between recording sessions most days, periodically traveling with road bands filling in as a substitute for guitarists in bands such as Johnny Paycheck, George Jones, Statler Brothers, Rhonda Vincent, as well as on the Grand Ole Opry. He joined Merle Haggard's band in 1997 while continuing to record with other musicians such as Brad Paisley, garnering a 2009 Grammy for Best Country Instrumental Performance. In 2000, Volkaert moved to Austin, Texas where he held a residency at the Continental Club for 20 years with his own band on Saturday afternoons, and Sunday nights with the band Heybale! He continued to tour extensively with Merle as well as his own band in between tours.

Volkaert is best known as a Fender Telecaster player, with a personal collection that includes a 1953 Fender Telecaster, a 1951 Fender Nocaster, and a 1958 Fender Esquire. He has lent his name to guitars made by other companies, including Asher.

Volkaert relocated to Virginia in 2020 during the COVID lockdown, recording and giving Skype lessons for a year and a half. As of May 2021, he has been back playing, recording, and traveling in the United States and abroad.

== Discography ==
Year	Title	Label
2008	Redd Volkaert - Reddhead	Telehog
2006	Redd Volkaert - Teletwang (DVD)	Hal Leonard Corporation
2004	Redd Volkaert - For The Ladies	HighTone Records
2003	ContinentaLIVE, Heybale!	
2002	26 Days On The Road, as one of The Twangbangers	Shout! Factory
2001	No Stranger To A Tele	HighTone Records
1998	Telewacker	Shout! Factory
