= Chet Atkins Picks on the Pops =

Studio album by Chet Atkins, Arthur Fiedler
- Released: 1969
- Genre: Country, pop
- Label: RCA Red Seal

Chet Atkins chronology
C.B. Atkins & C.E. Snow by Special Request (1969)	Chet Atkins Picks on the Pops (1969)	Me & Jerry (1970)

Professional ratings
Review scores
Source	Rating
Allmusic	4/5 stars

Chet Picks on the Pops is the title of a recording by Chet Atkins and Arthur Fiedler and the Boston Pops Orchestra, the second they produced. The arrangements, by Richard Hayman, were recorded live in Boston’s Symphony Hall.

== Track listing ==
=== Side one ===
1. "Delilah"
2. "Ode to Billie Joe" (Bobbie Gentry)
3. "Scarborough Fair" (Traditional)
4. "Wimoweh" (Campbell)
5. "By the Time I Get to Phoenix" (Jimmy Webb)

=== Side two ===
1. "This Guy’s in Love With You" (Burt Bacharach, Hal David)
2. "Spanish Harlem" (Jerry Leiber, Phil Spector)
3. "Galveston" (Jimmy Webb)
4. "Last Waltz" (Mason, Reed)
5. "The Ballad of New Orleans/Sugarfoot Rag" (Jimmy Driftwood, Hank Garland)

== Personnel ==
- Chet Atkins – guitar
- Arthur Fiedler – conductor
- Richard Hayman – arranger
- Bob Moore – bass
- Jerry Carrigan – drums
