= East Tennessee Christmas =

Studio album by Chet Atkins
- Released: 1983
- Genre: Christmas, country
- Length: 31:41
- Label: Columbia
- Producer: Chet Atkins

Chet Atkins chronology
Standard Brands (1981)	East Tennessee Christmas (1983)	Work It Out With Chet Atkins C.G.P. (1983)

East Tennessee Christmas is the fifty-first studio album and the second Christmas album by guitarist Chet Atkins, issued by Columbia Records in 1983.

Atkins had recorded a Christmas with Chet Atkins previously for RCA Victor 22 years earlier. He covers some of the same territory in this release but with a smoother production.

== Reception ==
Professional ratings
Review scores
Source	Rating
Allmusic	2/5 stars

Writing for Allmusic, critic Stephen Thomas Erlewine wrote of the album "... an accomplished but unremarkable holiday effort. Much of the album sounds too slick, and the song selection is a little too predictable for its good, making the record itself sound like it is something Atkins had done before... the overall album makes little impression, and only dedicated Atkins fans will need to add this to their collection.

== Track listing ==
1. "Jingle Bell Rock" (Joe Beal, Jim Boothe) – 2:07
2. "White Christmas" (Irving Berlin) – 2:42
3. "Let It Snow! Let It Snow! Let It Snow!" (Sammy Cahn, Jule Styne) – 2:40
4. "Winter Wonderland" (Felix Bernard, Richard B. Smith) – 2:42
5. "The Christmas Song" (Mel Tormé, Robert Wells) – 3:10
6. "I'll Be Home for Christmas" (Kim Gannon, Walter Kent, Buck Ram) – 3:18
7. "East Tennessee Christmas" (John Knowles, Atkins) – 2:47
8. "Do You Hear What I Hear?" (Noël Regney, Gloria Shayne Baker) – 3:24
9. "The Little Drummer Boy" (Katherine K. Davis, Henry Onorati, Harry Simeone) – 3:08
10. "God Rest Ye Merry Gentlemen" (Traditional) – 1:22
11. "Silent Night" (Josef Mohr, Franz Xaver Gruber) – 2:04
12. "Away in a Manger" (Traditional) – 2:01

== Personnel ==
- Chet Atkins – guitar
