= Kym Warner =

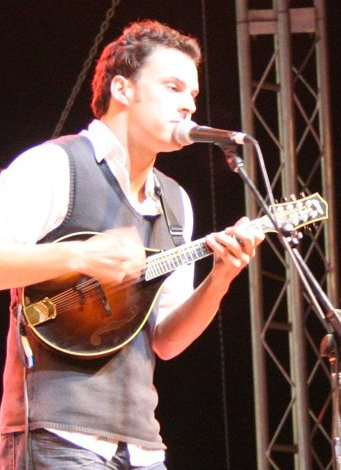
- Kym Warner in 2007

Background information
- Born: Kym Warner
- Genres: Bluegrass, Country music
- Occupations: Singer, songwriter, musician, record producer
- Instruments: Vocals, mandolin
- Years active: 1990s–present
- Label: Sugar Hill
- Member of: The Greencards

Kym Warner is an Australian musician and record producer, and a founding member of the American bluegrass band The Greencards. Warner was an aspiring bluegrass musician (which was unusual in Australia at the time) after inheriting the music from his father, an early Australian bluegrass pioneer.

== Background ==
The winner of the Australian National Bluegrass Mandolin Championship for four consecutive years, Warner had toured with country music artists Gina Jeffreys, and with Young again in Kasey Chambers's band. Before the band formed, Carol Young and Warner both knew each other, and according to Warner had been drawn to bluegrass and American roots music through an appreciation of George Jones and Merle Haggard.

After meeting, Warner and Carol Young made the decision to emigrate to America, to pursue musical careers there. Later, Young and Warner were living together in Sydney and trying to find work in the moribund Australian bluegrass scene. After leaving Australia, they spent time in West Texas before relocating to Austin.

According to McLoughlin, Kym Warner's father, Trev, was instrumental in bringing bluegrass music to Australia. It appears that he did play a significant part in the development of Australian Bluegrass music. He was also part of the trio, Trev, Rick and Dennis, and the duo Trev & Dennis who had a local hit in 1971 with "The Corroboree Song".

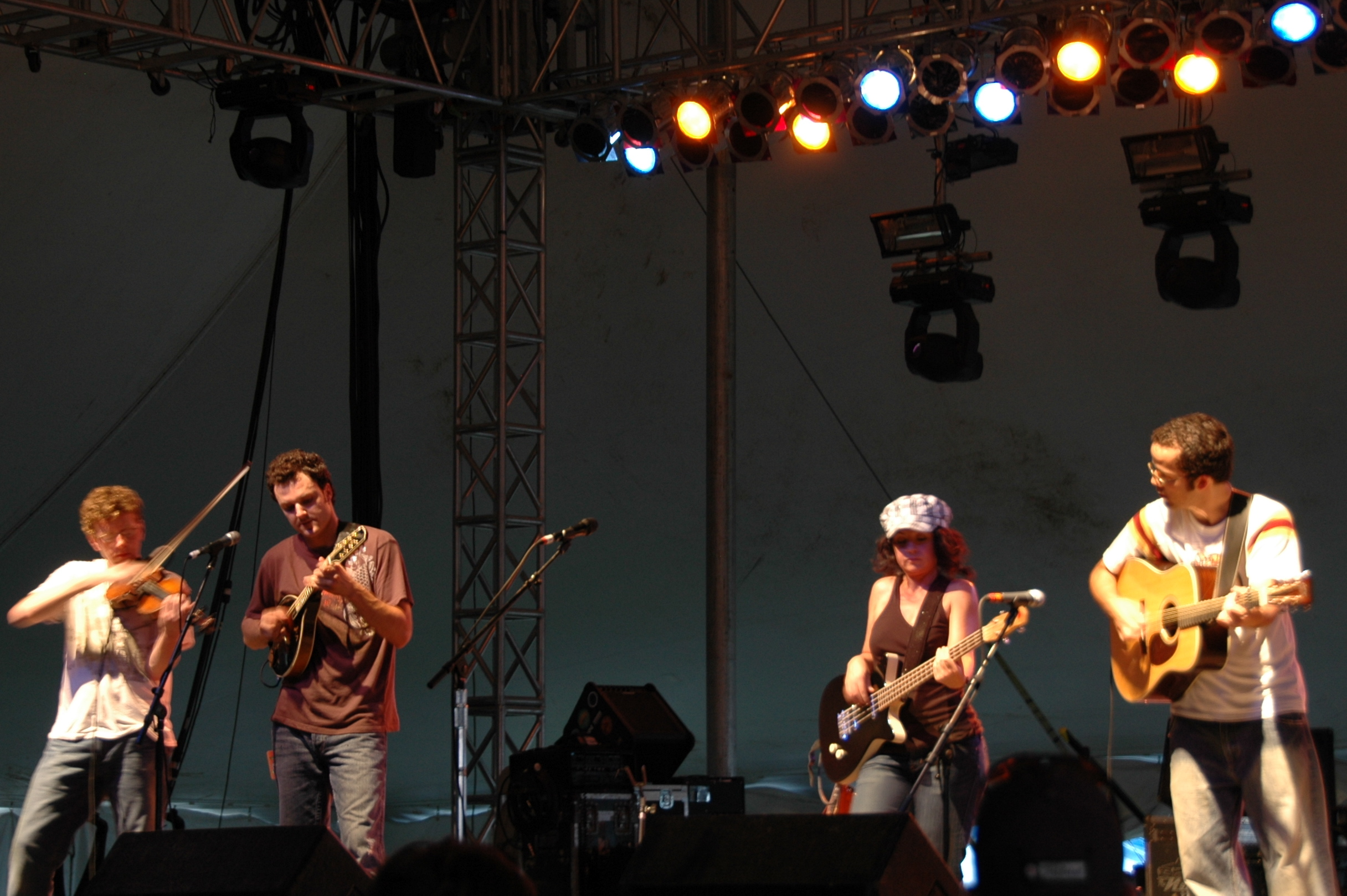
The Greencards in concert

== Career ==
In the US, Warner and Young met the other founding member of The Greencards, Eamon McLoughlin, at a recording session. Warner was producing an album for the recording artist Bill Atkins, and found they needed a fiddle player, which led to the recruitment of McLoughlin. Initially the immigrants got to know one another through their mutual love of Monty Python, Benny Hill, and Fawlty Towers. They began to have jam sessions afterwards, and according to Warner, there was evident chemistry between the trio, which led to their writing songs together. They named themselves The Greencards, for the fact that all three band members carried United States green cards. They eventually began to perform shows locally in Austin to finance the recording of what would become their debut album, 2003's Movin' On. In the process, they became one of the most popular musical groups in Austin. Representative of an emerging "newgrass" movement, The Greencards' acoustic sound was said to incorporate eclectic influences from Irish traditional, European gypsy, and Latin American sources.

Their first performance together as a band was at the Austin Irish pub, Mother Egan's. Given a noon to 3 pm time slot, they surprisingly began to fill the pub with patrons week after week, with fans there calling them the "Bluegrass Bunch". Several months later, The Greencards began performing an additional three to five times per week in Austin, in addition to their Mother Egan's Sunday show. Warner credited the frantic pace of their performance schedule during their Austin formation for their cohesion as a group and for driving them to create more new original music. During their time performing locally in Austin, they toured with various local Texas musicians, including Robert Earl Keen.

In 2005, Warner and The Greencards toured extensively with Bob Dylan and Willie Nelson. During the summer segment of the 2005 tour, Warner wanted to have the opportunity to pick Dylan's brain, but never had the chance. Warner did not get to spend much time with him, but Dylan told him at the end of the tour, "You’ll be fine from now on." In December 2007, it was announced that their song "Mucky the Duck" from Viridian was nominated for the Grammy Award for Best Country Instrumental Performance at the 50th Grammy Awards, but ultimately lost to Brad Paisley's "Throttleneck". Written by Warner, "Mucky the Duck" was inspired by one of the band's favourite Houston musical venues, The Mucky Duck.
