= Reflections (Chet Atkins and Doc Watson album) =

- Cover of the original 1980 LP

Studio album by Chet Atkins and Doc Watson
- Released: 1980
- Recorded: September 25, 1979, Room 206, Spence Manor Hotel, Nashville, TN
- Genre: Country, bluegrass
- Length: 27:45
- Label: RCA Records
- Producer: Chet Atkins, John D. Loudermilk

Chet Atkins chronology
First Nashville Guitar Quartet (1979)	Reflections (1980)	The Best of Chet on the Road — Live (1981)

Doc Watson chronology
Live and Pickin' (1979)	Reflections (1980)	Red Rocking Chair (1981)

Alternative cover
- CD cover of Sugar Hill Records re-issue of Reflections

Reflections is a recording by American guitarists Chet Atkins and Doc Watson. The two musical legends team up on ten songs.

== Reception ==
Professional ratings
Review scores
Source	Rating
Allmusic	3/5 stars

Writing for Allmusic, music critic Michael B. Smith called the release a "deeply personal recording" and wrote of the album "Two of the finest guitarists the world has ever produced are together on one fun-filled record."

== Reissues ==
- Originally released on RCA, it was reissued on CD by Sugar Hill Records.

== Track listing ==
=== Side one ===
1. "Dill Pickle Rag" (Traditional) – 2:33
2. "Me and Chet Made a Record" (Chet Atkins, Doc Watson) – 2:35
3. "Flatt Did It" (Atkins, Watson) – 2:13
4. "Medley: Tennessee Rag/Beaumont Rag" (Traditional) – 2:26
5. "Medley: Texas Gales/Old Joe Clark" (Traditional) – 3:10

=== Side two ===
1. "You're Gonna Be Sorry" (Delmore, Delmore) – 2:21
2. "Goodnight Waltz" – 2:56
3. "Don't Monkey 'Round My Widder" (Karl Davis) – 3:29
4. "Medley: Black and White/Ragtime Annie" (Atkins, Watson) – 2:39
5. "On My Way to Canaan's Land" (Traditional) – 3:05

== Personnel ==
- Chet Atkins – guitar, vocals
- Doc Watson - guitar, vocals
- T. Michael Coleman - bass
- Terry McMillan - percussion
- Jerry Shook - guitar
