= Carol Young =

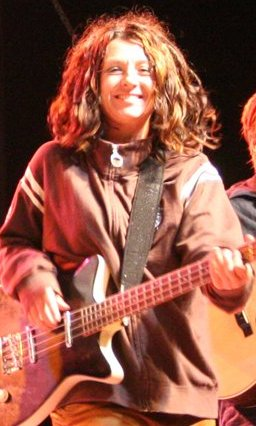
- Carol Young in 2007

Background information
- Genres: Bluegrass, Country music
- Occupations: Singer, songwriter, musician
- Instruments: Vocals, Bass guitar
- Years active: 1990s–present
- Label: Sugar Hill
- Member of: The Greencards

Carol Young is an Australian musician, and a founding member of the American bluegrass band The Greencards.

== Biography ==
=== Early life ===
Young is originally from Coffs Harbour, New South Wales. Prior to the founding of The Greencards, Young won the Australian Independent Country Artist of the Year award in 2000, and had recorded two No. 1 Australian-charted country music singles. Early on, Young was a singer in Outback country bands and acts, including Gina Jeffreys. Young was previously nominated as "Best Female Vocalist" by the Country Music Association of Australia, and won the Australian independent country artist of the year award in 2000 due in part to her No. 1 singles "True Blue Fool" and "Part of the Past".

=== The Greencards ===
Before the band formed, Kym Warner and Young both knew each other, and according to Warner had been drawn to bluegrass and American roots music through an appreciation of George Jones and Merle Haggard. Warner and Young toured together in Kasey Chambers's band. After meeting, Warner and Young made the decision to emigrate to America, to pursue musical careers there. Later, Young and Warner were living together in Sydney, and trying to find work in the moribund Australian bluegrass scene. After leaving Australia, they spent time in West Texas before relocating to Austin.

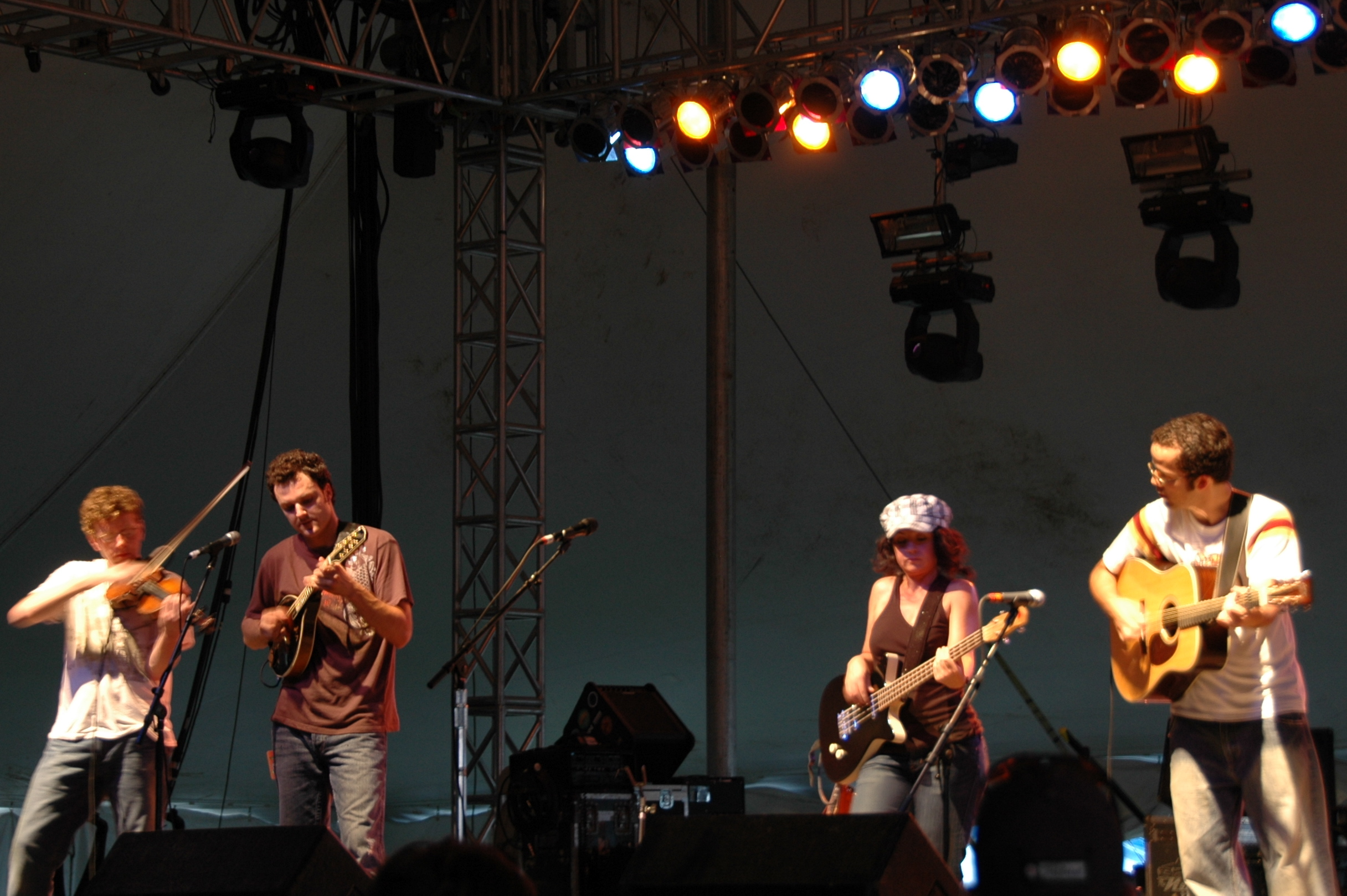
The Greencards in concert

Young and Warner met the other founding member of The Greencards, Eamon McLoughlin, at a recording session. Warner was producing an album for the recording artist Bill Atkins, and found they needed a fiddle player, which led to the recruitment of McLoughlin. Initially, they got to know one another through their mutual love of Monty Python, Benny Hill, and Fawlty Towers. They began to have jam sessions afterwards, and according to Warner, there was evident chemistry between the trio, leading to their writing songs together. They named themselves The Greencards, for the fact that all three band members carried United States green cards. They eventually began to perform shows locally in Austin to finance the recording of what would become their debut album, 2003's Movin' On. In the process, they became one of the most popular musical groups in Austin. Representative of an emerging "newgrass" movement, The Greencards' acoustic sound was said to incorporate eclectic influences from Irish traditional, European gypsy, and Latin American sources.

Their first performance together as a band was at the Austin Irish pub, Mother Egan's. Given a noon to 3:00 pm time slot, they surprisingly began to fill the pub with patrons week after week, with fans there calling them the "Bluegrass Bunch". Several months later, The Greencards began performing an additional three to five times per week in Austin, in addition to their Mother Egan's Sunday show. Warner credited the frantic pace of their performance schedule during their Austin formation for their cohesion as a group and for driving them to create more new original music. During their time performing locally in Austin, they toured with various local Texas musicians, including Robert Earl Keen.

Young's voice was noted for its "dreamy, haunting quality". In a review of Viridian, Embo Blake of Hybrid Magazine noted Carol Young's vocal skill, as she "effortlessly diphthongs cadence" on the track "Waiting on the Night".
