= Grammy Award for Best Country Instrumental Performance =

Grammy Award category

The Grammy Award for Best Country Instrumental Performance was awarded from 1970 to 2011. Between 1986 and 1989 the award was presented as the Grammy Award for Best Country Instrumental Performance (Orchestra, Group or Soloist).

In 2012 the award was discontinued in a major overhaul of Grammy categories. From 2012, the best instrumental performances in the country category were shifted to either the Best Country Solo Performance or Best Country Duo/Group Performance categories, both newly formed.

Years reflect the year in which the Grammy Awards were presented, for works released in the previous year.

== Recipients ==
Year	Winner(s)	Title	Nominees	Ref.
1970	Danny Davis & Nashville Brass	The Nashville Brass Featuring Danny Davis Play More Nashville Sounds	Floyd Cramer for Lovin' Season; Bob Dylan for "Nashville Skyline Rag"; Chet Atkins for Solid Gold '69; Tommy Allsup & The Nashville Survey for The Hits of Charley Pride	
1971	Chet Atkins, Jerry Reed	Me & Jerry	Jerry Smith for Drivin' Home; Merle Haggard & the Strangers for Street Singer; Chet Atkins for Yestergroovin; Danny Davis & Nashville Brass for You Ain't Heard Nothin' Yet	
1972	Chet Atkins	"Snowbird"	Floyd Cramer for For the Good Times; Jerry Kennedy for Jerry Kennedy Plays: With All Due Respect to Kris Kristofferson; Bakersfield Brass for Rose Garden; Danny Davis & Nashville Brass for Ruby, Don't Take Your Love to Town	
1973	Charlie McCoy	The Real McCoy	Chet Atkins for Chet Atkins Picks on the Hits; Danny Davis & Nashville Brass for Flowers on the Wall; Lester Flatt for Foggy Mountain Breakdown; Chet Atkins, Jerry Reed for Me and Chet	
1974	Eric Weissberg, Steve Mandell	"Dueling Banjos"	Chet Atkins for Fiddlin' Around; Charlie McCoy for Good Time Charlie; Danny Davis & Nashville Brass for I'll Fly Away; Chet Atkins for Superpickers	
1975	Chet Atkins, Merle Travis	The Atkins–Travis Traveling Show	Charlie McCoy, Barefoot Jerry for Boogie Woogie; Danny Davis & Nashville Brass for Nashville Brass in Blue Grass Country; Charlie McCoy for The Nashville Hit Many; Floyd Cramer for The Young and the Restless	
1976	Chet Atkins	"The Entertainer"	Charlie McCoy for Charlie My Boy; Chet Atkins, Jerry Reed for Colonel Bogey; Asleep at the Wheel for Fat Boy Rag; Vassar Clements for Vassar Clements	
1977	Chet Atkins, Les Paul	Chester and Lester	Ace Cannon for Blue Eyes Crying in the Rain; Floyd Cramer for I'm Thinking Tonight of My Blue Eyes; The Marshall Tucker Band for Long Hard Ride; Danny Davis & Nashville Brass for Texas	
1978	Hargus "Pig" Robbins	Country Instrumentalist of the Year	Chet Atkins, Floyd Cramer, Danny David for Chet, Floyd and Danny; Chet Atkins for Me and My Guitar; Asleep at the Wheel for "Ragtime Annie"; Jerry Reed for "West Bound and Down"	
1979	Asleep at the Wheel	"One O'Clock Jump"	Roy Clark, Buck Trent for Banjo Bandits; Danny Davis & Nashville Brass for Cookin' Country; Roy Clark for "Steel Guitar Rag"; Doc Watson, Merle Watson for Under the Double Eagle	
1980	Doc Watson & Merle Watson	"Big Sandy/Leather Britches"	Osborne Brothers for Bluegrass Concerto; Lester Flatt's Nashville Grass for Fantastic Pickin'; Floyd Cramer for In Concert; Nashville Super Pickers for Live From Austin City Limits; Vassar Clements, Doug Jernigan, Jesse McReynolds, Buddy Spicher for Nashville Jam	
1981	Gilley's Urban Cowboy Band	"Orange Blossom Special/Hoedown"	Danny Davis & Nashville Brass for "Cotton-Eyed Joe"; Floyd Cramer for Dallas; Chet Atkins for Dance With Me; Ry Cooder for The Long Riders	
1982	Chet Atkins	Country, After All These Years	Barbara Mandrell for "Instrumental Medley: Mountain Dew, Fireball Mail, Old Joe Clark, Night Train, Uncle Joe's Boogie"; Chet Atkins, Doc Watson for Reflections; Johnny Gimble for The Texas Fiddle Collection; Merle Travis for Travis Pickin'	
1983	Roy Clark	"Alabama Jubilee"	Doc Watson, Merle Watson for Below Freezing; Poco for "Feudin'"; Albert Coleman's Atlanta Pops Orchestra for Just Hooked on Country; Joe Maphis for The Joe Maphis Flat-Pick-ing Spectacular	
1984	New South	"Fireball"	Albert Coleman's Atlanta Pops for Classic Country I; Doc Watson, Merle Watson for Doc and Merle Watson's Guitar Album; Earl Scruggs for Roller Coaster; Chet Atkins for Tara Theme; Roy Clark for Wildwood Flower	
1985	Ricky Skaggs	"Wheel Hoss"	Carlton Moody & the Moody Brothers for "Cotton-Eyed Joe"; Chet Atkins for East Tennessee Christmas; The Whites for Move It on Over; Doc Watson, Merle Watson for "Twin Sisters"	
1986	Chet Atkins, Mark Knopfler	"Cosmic Square Dance"	Earl Scruggs for Folsom Prison Blues; Charlie McCoy for Lasso the Moon; Vassar Clements, John Hartford, Dave Holland for Vassar Clements, John Hartford, Dave Holland; Doc Watson, Merle Watson for Windy and Warm	
1987	Ricky Skaggs	"Raisin' the Dickens"	Mark O'Connor for Meanings Of; New Grass Revival for Seven by Seven; Albert Lee for Speechless; Jerry Douglas for Under the Wire	
1988	Asleep at the Wheel	"String of Pars"	Jerry Douglas for Changing Channels; Albert Lee for Gagged But Not Bound; Bill Monroe for The Old Brown Country Barn; Stéphane Grappelli, Vassar Clements for Together at Last	
1989	Asleep at the Wheel	"Sugarfoot Rag"	Leo Kottke for "Busy Signal"; Mason Williams, Chip Davis and Mannheim Steamroller for "Country Idyll"; Johnny Gimble for "Still Fiddlin' Around"; Carlton Moody & The Moody Brothers for "The Great Train Song Medley"	
1990	Randy Scruggs	"Amazing Grace"	John Hartford for "All I Got Is Gone Away"; New Grass Revival for "Big Foot"; Asleep at the Wheel for "Black and White Rag"; Jerry Douglas for "If You've Got the Money (Honey I've Got the Time)"	
1991	Chet Atkins, Mark Knopfler	"So Soft, Your Goodbye"	David Grisman for 'Dawg '90; Asleep at the Wheel for Pedernales Stroll; Foster and Lloyd for Whoa; Wild Rose for Wild Rose	
1992	Mark O'Connor	The New Nashville Cats	Chet Atkins, Mark Knopfler for Neck and Neck; The Osborne Brothers for "Orange Blossom Special"; Diamond Rio for "Poultry Promenade"; Roy Rogers, Norton Buffalo for "Song for Jessica"	
1993	Chet Atkins, Jerry Reed	Sneakin' Around	Asleep at the Wheel for "Black and White Rag"; The Chieftains with Ricky Skaggs for "Cotton-Eyed Joe"; Jerry Douglas for "Ride the Wild Turkey"; Emmylou Harris and The Nash Ramblers for "Scotland"	
1994	Asleep at the Wheel Featuring Eldon Shamblin, Johnny Gimble, Chet Atkins, Vince Gill, Marty Stuart & Reuben "Lucky Oceans" Gosfield	"Red Wing"	Roy Clark for "Jingle Bells"; John McEuen for "The Ballad of Jed Clampett"; Mark O'Connor, Byron Berline for "Gold Rush"; Mark O'Connor, Johnny Gimble for "Fiddlin' Around"	
1995	Chet Atkins	"Young Thing"	Roy Clark, Joe Pass for "Kaw-Liga"; Diamond Rio for "Appalachian Dream"; Randy Scruggs, Earl Scruggs, Doc Watson for Keep on the Sunny Side; Marty Stuart for Marty Stuart Visits the Moon	
1996	Asleep at the Wheel, Bela Fleck, Johnny Gimble	"Hightower"	Byron Berline, Earl Scruggs, Bill Monroe for "Sally Goodin"; Béla Fleck for "Cheeseballs in Cowtown"; Flaco Jiménez, Lee Roy Parnell for "Cat Walk"; Doc Watson for "Thunder Road/Sugarfoot Rag"	
1997	Chet Atkins	"Jam Man"	Vassar Clements, Richard Greene, Chris Thile, Scott Nygaard, Todd Philips for "Scotland"; Diamond Rio for "Big"; Ronnie McCoury, David Grier, Stuart Duncan, Craig Smith, Todd Phillips for "Rawhide"; Steve Wariner with Bryan Austin, Derek George, Jeffrey Steele, and Bryan White for "The Brickyard Boogie"	
1998	Alison Krauss & Union Station	"Little Liza Jane"	Asleep at the Wheel for "Fat Boy Rag"; Chet Atkins, Tommy Emmanuel for "Smokey Mountain Lullaby"; Scotty Moore, D.J. Fontana, Bill Black Combo for "Going Back to Memphis"; Lee Roy Parnell for "Mama, Screw Your Wig On Tight"	
1999	Randy Scruggs, Vince Gill	"A Soldier's Joy"	Doc Watson, Merle Watson, Various Artists for "Reuben's Train"; Jerry Douglas, Bela Fleck for "The Ride"; Randy Scruggs, Earl Scruggs, Jerry Douglas for "Lonesome Ruben"; Ricky Skaggs, Kentucky Thunder for "Get Up John"	
2000	Asleep at the Wheel featuring Tommy Allsup, Floyd Domino, Larry Franklin, Vince Gill & Steve Wariner	"Bob's Breakdowns"	Del McCoury, Doc Watson & Mac Wiseman for "Black Mountain Rag"; Marty Stuart & Earl Scruggs for "Mr. John Henry, Steel Driving Man"; Marty Stuart for "The Greatest Love of All Time (Reprise)"; Steve Wariner for "The Harry Shuffle"	
2001	Alison Brown, Bela Fleck	"Leaving Cottondale"	Nickel Creek for "Ode to a Butterfly"; Tim O'Brien, Darrell Scott for "The Second Mouse"; Keith Urban for "Rollercoaster"; Steve Wariner, Ryan Wariner for "Bloodlines"	
2002	Various Artists	"Foggy Mountain Breakdown"	Asleep at the Wheel, Brad Paisley for "Sugarfoot Rag"; Bill Kirchen for "Poultry in Motion"; Alison Krauss & Union Station for "Choctaw Hayride"; Brad Paisley for "Munster Rag"	
2003	Dixie Chicks	"Lil' Jack Slade"	Bering Strait for Bearing Straight; The Chieftains, Earl Scruggs for "Sally Goodin"; Bela Fleck for "Bear Mountain Hop"; Nickel Creek for "Smoothie Song"	
2004	Alison Krauss & Union Station	"Cluck Old Hen"	Ray Benson for "Ain't Chet Yet"; Brad Paisley ft. Redd Volkaert for "Spaghetti Western Swing"; Earl Scruggs, Doc Watson, Ricky Skaggs for "Pick Along"; Ricky Skaggs, Kentucky Thunder for "Get Up John"	
2005	Nitty Gritty Dirt Band ft. Earl Scruggs, Randy Scruggs, Vassar Clements, Jerry Douglas	"Earl's Breakdown"	Asleep at the Wheel for "Billy in the Low Ground"; Sam Bush for "Puppies 'n Knapsacks"; Albert Lee, Vince Gill, Brad Paisley for "Luxury Liner"; Mark O'Connor, Chris Thile, Bryan Sutton, Byron House for "Bowtie"	
2006	Alison Krauss and Union Station	"Unionhouse Branch"	Charlie Daniels for "I'll Fly Away"; Jerry Douglas, Sam Bush, Bela Fleck for "Who's Your Uncle?"; Nickel Creek for "Scotch & Chocolate"; Brad Paisley for "Time Warp"	
2007	Bryan Sutton, Doc Watson	"Whiskey Before Breakfast"	Casey Driessen for "Jerusalem Ridge"; Tommy Emmanuel for "Gameshow Rag/Cannonball Rag"; Chris Thile for "The Eleventh Reel"; Jim Van Cleve for "Nature of the Beast"	
2008	Brad Paisley	"Throttleneck"	Russ Barenberg for "Little Monk"; The Greencards for "Mucky the Duck"; Andy Statman for "Rawhide!"; The Time Jumpers for "Fidoodlin'"	
2009	Brad Paisley, James Burton, Vince Gill, John Jorgenson, Albert Lee, Brent Mason, Redd Volkaert, Steve Wariner	"Cluster Pluck"	Cherryholmes for "Sumatra"; Jerry Douglas, Lloyd Green for "Two Small Cars in Rome"; Bela Fleck & The Flecktones for "Sleigh Ride"; Charlie Haden, Pat Metheny, Jerry Douglas, Bruce Hornsby for "Is This America? (Katrina 2005)"	
2010	Steve Wariner	"Producer's Medley"	Alison Brown for "Under the (Five) Wire"; The Greencards for "The Crystal Merchant"; Sarah Jarosz for "Mansinneedof"	
2011	Marty Stuart	"Hummingbyrd"	Cherryholmes for "Tattoo of a Smudge"; The Infamous Stringdusters for "Magic #9"; Punch Brothers for "New Chance Blues"; Darrell Scott for "Willow Creek"	
