= The Nashville String Band =

Studio album by The Nashville String Band
- Released: 1969
- Recorded: RCA "Nashville Sound" Studios, Nashville, TN
- Genre: Country
- Length: 28:19
- Label: RCA Victor
- Producers: Bob Ferguson, Chet Atkins

Chet Atkins chronology
Lover's Guitar (1969)	The Nashville String Band (1969)	Solid Gold 69 (1969)

Chet Atkins Collaborations chronology
The Pops Goes Country (1966)	The Nashville String Band (1969)	C.B. Atkins & C.E. Snow by Special Request (1969)

The Nashville String Band is the 1969 debut album by The Nashville String Band. The band consisted of Chet Atkins and Homer and Jethro. Atkins produced many of Homer and Jethro's later RCA albums and they in turn performed on a number of his.

They released six albums on the RCA label.

== Track listing ==
=== Side one ===
1. "La Fiesta" (Byron Williams) – 2:30
2. "Yellow Bird" (Keith - Bergman - Luboff)– 3:18
3. "El Paso" (Marty Robbins)– 2:47
4. "Granada" (Lara - Stewart) – 2:49
5. "Adios Amigos" (Ralph Freed - Jerry Livingston) – 2:29
6. "La Golondrina (The Swallow)" (N. Serradell) – 1:51

=== Side two ===
1. "Caribbean" (Mitchell Torok)– 2:24
2. "Tomorrow's Tears (Morir un poco)" (Alvaro Covacevic, R. I. Allen) – 2:07
3. "Maria Elena" (S. K. Russell, Lorenzo Barcelata)– 3:17
4. "Drina" (Stanislav Binički, Vaughn Horton) – 2:35
5. "In a Little Spanish Town" (Sam M. Lewis, Joe Young, Mabel Wayne)– 2:12

== Personnel ==
- Chet Atkins - guitar
- Henry "Homer" Haynes - guitar
- Kenneth "Jethro" Burns - mandolin
