= Eamon McLoughlin =

Country and Bluegrass musician

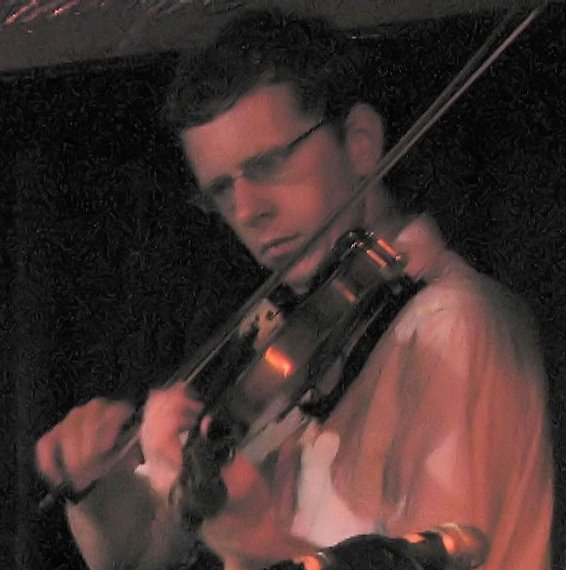
- Eamon McLoughlin in 2007

Background information
- Born: Eamon McLoughlin; London, England, UK
- Genres: Bluegrass, Country music
- Occupations: Singer, songwriter, musician
- Instruments: Vocals, Fiddle, Mandolin
- Years active: 1997–present

Eamon McLoughlin is an English musician based in Nashville, Tennessee. Primarily a fiddle player, he has toured and recorded with artists in the country music, bluegrass, and Americana fields. He holds the position of staff fiddler at the Grand Ole Opry, working with a diverse range of artists including Vince Gill, Nina Simone, Carly Pearce, and the Oak Ridge Boys. McLoughlin performs in the (separate) touring bands of Emmylou Harris and Rodney Crowell. He also sings, plays mandolin, guitar, cello and viola, and can be seen performing regularly with The Fifty Shades of Hay. He has received two Grammy nominations for Country Instrumental Performance as a founding member of the American bluegrass band The Greencards.

== Biography ==
Raised in South London by Irish parents, McLoughlin began to perform country music shows with his family on weekends, influenced by George Jones, George Strait and Ricky Skaggs. McLoughlin's father was head of a London-based country band. At age nine, McLoughlin moved away from piano lessons to play fiddle, and performed with his father's band. He was influenced heavily by fiddlers such as Mark O'Connor, Stuart Duncan, Bobby Hicks, Rob Hajacos, Tommy Jackson, Johnny Gimble, Buddy Spicher. McLoughlin moved to Austin in 1997, after leaving Sussex University with a degree in politics and American studies. He first toured with the Asylum Street Spankers, and later Ray Wylie Hubbard, Bruce Robison, Kelly Willis and the Austin Lounge Lizards. As a founding member of The Greencards, he received two Grammy nominations and recorded four albums for Dualtone Records and Sugar Hill Records.

2010-2015 Eamon McLoughlin worked with Josh Turner. 2015: BoDeans, Ashley Monroe. In 2016 he became the Staff Fiddler for the Grand Ole Opry. In 2016 The Fifty Shades of Hay released their first album.

== Recording ==
He has appeared as a session musician for Rodney Crowell, Robert Earl Keen, Kim Richey, Toby Keith, Hailey Withers, A Thousand Horses, Bruce Robison and Kelly Willis, Nielson Hubbard, Caroline Spence, The Band Perry, Gretchen Peters, Ashley Monroe, Anderson East, Kristin Diable, Danny Burns and others. McLoughlin has written and recorded string arrangements for Mary Chapin Carpenter, Anderson East, John Paul White.
