= Skeeter Davis discography =

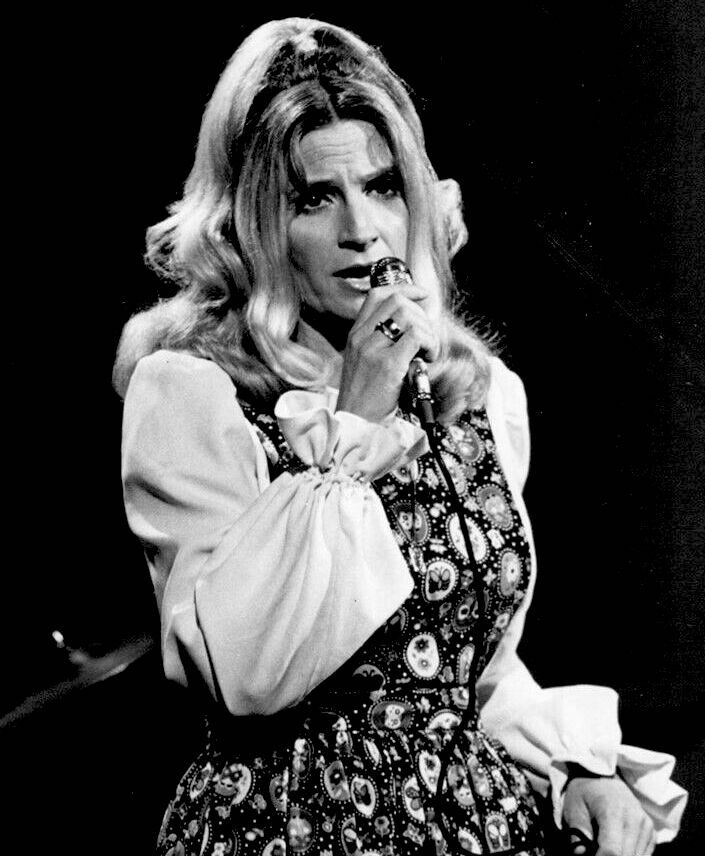
- Davis performing in 1972
- Studio albums: 32
- Compilation albums: 18
- Singles: 59
- Lead singles: 53
- Collaborative singles: 6
- Other charted songs: 2
- Other appearances: 2

The discography of American country artist Skeeter Davis contains 32 studio albums, 18 compilation albums, 59 singles, 53 lead singles, six collaborative singles, two other charted songs and two additional appearances. Davis was first one half of the duo, The Davis Sisters before embarking on a solo career with the RCA Victor label. Her second single was 1957's "Lost to a Geisha Girl", which reached the top 15 of the American Billboard Hot Country Songs chart. It was followed in 1959 by the top five country selection, "Set Him Free". The same year, Davis's debut studio album was issued on RCA Victor titled I'll Sing You a Song and Harmonize Too. Her career momentum continued to build in 1960 with two top five back-to-back singles: "(I Can't Help You) I'm Falling Too" and "My Last Date (With You)". Both selections also climbed into the Billboard Hot 100 top 40. They were featured on Davis's second studio album called Here's the Answer. Between 1961 and 1962, Davis had top ten Billboard country singles with "Optimistic" and "Where I Ought to Be".

In 1963, Davis reached the zenith of commercial success with the single, "The End of the World". The song reached number two on the Billboard country and pop charts. It also reached the top ten of the R&B chart and topped the adult contemporary chart. It was included on her third studio album called Skeeter Davis Sings The End of the World. It was followed by another crossover single titled "I Can't Stay Mad at You". Between 1963 and 1964, Davis reached the Billboard country top ten with "I'm Saving My Love" and "Gonna Get Along Without You Now". Between 1963 and 1964, RCA Victor released two studio LP's of her material, including Cloudy with Occasional Tears, which reached number 11 on the Billboard Top Country Albums chart. Although her singles reached progressively lower chart positions as the sixties progressed, RCA continued releasing a series of LP's of Davis's material. This included My Heart's in the Country (1966) and Why So Lonely? (1968), which reached charting Billboard country positions.

In 1965, Davis collaborated with country artist, Bobby Bare, on the top 20 single, "A Dear John Letter". It was included on their 1965 album, Tunes for Two, which charted at number eight on the Billboard country LP's chart. In 1967, Davis returned to the country top five with the single "What Does It Take (To Keep a Man Like You Satisfied)". Davis had several more top ten and top 20 country singles on the Billboard and RPM charts (Canadian country chart): "Fuel to the Flame" (1967), "There's a Fool Born Every Minute" (1968) and "I'm a Lover (Not a Fighter)" (1969). She continued recording for RCA Victor through 1974. Among her most commercially-successful songs of this period was 1971's "Bus Fare to Kentucky" and 1973's "I Can't Believe That It's All Over". The latter was a top 20 Billboard and RPM country single. Davis then released material on several independent labels through 1989. Among them was a collaborative studio album with NRBQ in 1985 called She Sings, They Play and 1989's You Were Made for Me with Teddy Nelson.

== Albums ==
=== Solo studio albums ===
List of albums, with selected chart positions, showing other relevant details
Title	Album details	Peak chart positions	
Title	Album details	US	US Cou.
I'll Sing You a Song and Harmonize Too	Released: November 1959; Label: RCA Victor; Formats: LP	—	—
Here's the Answer	Released: January 1961; Label: RCA Victor; Formats: LP	—	—
Skeeter Davis Sings The End of the World	Released: March 1963; Label: RCA Victor; Formats: LP	61	—
Cloudy, with Occasional Tears	Released: October 1963; Label: RCA Victor; Formats: LP	—	11
Let Me Get Close to You	Released: October 1964; Label: RCA Victor; Formats: LP	—	—
Written by the Stars	Released: June 1965; Label: RCA Victor; Formats: LP	—	—
Skeeter Sings Standards	Released: November 1965; Label: RCA Victor; Formats: LP	—	—
Singin' in the Summer Sun	Released: May 1966; Label: RCA Victor; Formats: LP	—	—
My Heart's in the Country	Released: November 1966; Label: RCA Victor; Formats: LP	—	14
Hand in Hand with Jesus	Released: May 1967; Label: RCA Victor; Formats: LP	—	—
Skeeter Davis Sings Buddy Holly	Released: June 1967; Label: RCA Victor; Formats: LP	—	—
What Does It Take (To Keep a Man Like You Satisfied)	Released: October 1967; Label: RCA Victor; Formats: LP	—	17
Why So Lonely?	Released: March 1968; Label: RCA Victor; Formats: LP	—	33
I Love Flatt and Scruggs	Released: August 1968; Label: RCA Victor; Formats: LP	—	39
The Closest Thing to Love	Released: February 1969; Label: RCA Victor; Formats: LP	—	—
"maryfrances"	Released: September 1969; Label: RCA Victor; Formats: LP	—	—
A Place in the Country	Released: March 1970; Label: RCA Victor; Formats: LP	—	—
It's Hard to Be a Woman	Released: August 1970; Label: RCA Victor; Formats: LP	—	—
Skeeter	Released: March 1971; Label: RCA Victor; Formats: LP	—	—
Love Takes a Lot of My Time	Released: August 1971; Label: RCA Victor; Formats: LP	—	—
Bring It on Home	Released: January 1972; Label: RCA Victor; Formats: LP	—	—
Skeeter Sings Dolly	Released: June 1972; Label: RCA Victor; Formats: LP	—	45
The Hillbilly Singer	Released: January 1973; Label: RCA Victor; Formats: LP	—	—
I Can't Believe That It's All Over	Released: September 1973; Label: RCA Victor; Formats: LP	—	25
The Best of the Best of Skeeter Davis (re-recordings)	Released: 1978; Label: Gusto; Formats: LP, cassette	—	—
Live Wire	Released: 1982; Label: 51 West; Formats: LP	—	—
Heart Strings	Released: 1983; Label: Tudor; Formats: LP	—	—
"—" denotes a recording that did not chart or was not released in that territory.

=== Collaborative studio albums ===
List of albums, with selected chart positions, showing other relevant details
Title	Album details	Peak chart positions
Title	Album details	US Country
Porter Wagoner and Skeeter Davis Sing Duets (with Porter Wagoner)	Released: May 1962; Label: RCA Victor; Formats: LP	—
Tunes for Two (with Bobby Bare)	Released: February 1965; Label: RCA Victor; Formats: LP	8
Your Husband, My Wife (with Bobby Bare)	Released: March 1970; Label: RCA Victor; Formats: LP	—
She Sings, They Play (with NRBQ)	Released: 1985; Label: Red Rooster/Rounder; Formats: LP, CD	—
You Were Made for Me (with Teddy Nelson)	Released: 1989; Label: Elli; Formats: LP, CD	—
"—" denotes a recording that did not chart or was not released in that territory.

=== Compilation albums ===
List of albums, with selected chart positions, showing other relevant details
Title	Album details	Peak chart positions
Title	Album details	US Country
I Forgot More Than You'll Ever Know	Released: April 1964; Label: RCA Camden; Formats: LP	—
The Best of Skeeter Davis	Released: January 1965; Label: RCA Victor; Formats: LP	—
Blueberry Hill and Other Favorites	Released: July 1965; Label: RCA Camden; Formats: LP	—
Just When I Needed You	Released: 1970; Label: RCA Victor; Formats: LP	—
Easy to Love	Released: 1970; Label: RCA Camden; Formats: LP	—
Foggy Mountain Top	Released: September 1971; Label: RCA Camden; Formats: LP	—
The End of the World	Released: December 1972; Label: RCA Camden; Formats: LP	—
The Best of Skeeter Davis, Vol. 2	Released: June 1973; Label: RCA Victor; Formats: LP	48
He Wakes Me with a Kiss	Released: 1974; Label: RCA Camden; Formats: LP	—
The Versatile Skeeter Davis	Released: 1975; Label: RCA; Formats: LP	—
The Best of Skeeter Davis and Bobby Bare	Released: 1983; Label: RCA Camden; Formats: LP, cassette	—
20 of the Best	Released: 1985; Label: RCA; Formats: LP, cassette	—
Best Selection	Released: October 21, 1989; Label: RCA; Formats: LP, cassette	—
Skeeter Davis	Released: October 21, 1989; Label: RCA; Formats: CD, cassette	—
The Essential Skeeter Davis	Released: March 28, 1995; Label: RCA; Formats: CD	—
RCA Country Legends: Skeeter Davis	Released: September 25, 2001; Label: Buddah/RCA; Formats: CD	—
The Pop Hits Collection	Released: August 26, 2003; Label: Taragon; Formats: CD	—
The Pop Hits Collection, Volume Two	Released: August 15, 2006; Label: Taragon; Formats: CD	—
"—" denotes a recording that did not chart or was not released in that territory.

== Singles ==
=== As lead artist ===
List of singles, with selected chart positions, and other relevant details
Title	Year	Peak chart positions							Album
Title	Year	US	US AC	US Cou.	US R&B	AUS	CAN Cou.	UK	Album
"He Left His Heart with Me"	1957	—	—	—	—	—	—	—	—N/a
"Lost to a Geisha Girl"	1957	—	—	15	—	—	—	—	—N/a
"Walk Softly, Darling"	1958	—	—	—	—	—	—	—	—N/a
"I Forgot More Than You'll Ever Know"	1958	—	—	—	—	—	—	—	I'll Sing You a Song and Harmonize Too
"I Ain't A-Talkin'"	1958	—	—	—	—	—	—	—	—N/a
"Set Him Free"	1959	—	—	5	—	—	—	—	I'll Sing You a Song and Harmonize Too
"Homebreaker"	1959	—	—	15	—	—	—	—	—N/a
"Am I That Easy to Forget?"	1960	—	—	11	—	—	—	—	I'll Sing You a Song and Harmonize Too
"(I Can't Help You) I'm Falling Too"	1960	39	—	2	—	—	—	—	Here's the Answer
"My Last Date (with You)"	1960	26	—	4	—	—	—	—	Here's the Answer
"The Hand You're Holding Now"	1961	—	—	11	—	—	—	—	—N/a
"Optimistic"	1961	—	—	10	—	—	—	—	—N/a
"Where I Ought to Be"	1962	—	—	9	—	—	—	—	—N/a
"The Little Music Box"	1962	—	—	22	—	—	—	—	—N/a
"The End of the World"	1962	2	1	2	4	32	—	18	Skeeter Davis Sings The End of the World
"I'm Saving My Love"	1963	41	13	9	—	—	—	—	Cloudy with Occasional Tears
"I Can't Stay Mad at You"	1963	7	2	14	—	46	—	—	Let Me Get Close to You
"He Says the Same Things to Me"	1964	47	15	17	—	—	—	—	Let Me Get Close to You
"Gonna Get Along Without You Now"	1964	48	15	8	—	75	—	—	Let Me Get Close to You
"Let Me Get Close to You"	1964	— (Note: "Let Me Get Close to You" did not enter the Hot 100, but peaked at number 6 on Bubbling Under Hot 100 Singles, which acts as a 25-song extension of the Hot 100.)	—	45	—	—	—	—	Let Me Get Close to You
"What Am I Gonna Do with You"	1964	— (Note: "What Am I Gonna Do with You" did not enter the Hot 100, but peaked at number 23 on Bubbling Under Hot 100 Singles, which acts as a 25-song extension of the Hot 100.)	—	38	—	—	—	—	—N/a
"I Can't Help It (If I'm Still in Love with You)"	1965	— (Note: "I Can't Help It (If I'm Still in Love with You)" did not enter the Hot 100, but peaked at number 26 on Bubbling Under Hot 100 Singles, which acts as a 25-song extension of the Hot 100.)	—	—	—	—	—	—	Written by the Stars
"Sun Glasses"	1965	— (Note: "Sun Glasses" did not enter the Hot 100, but peaked at number 20 on Bubbling Under Hot 100 Singles, which acts as a 25-song extension of the Hot 100.)	—	30	—	—	—	—	Singin' in the Summer Sun
"I Can't See Me Without You"	1966	—	—	—	—	—	—	—	What Does It Take (To Keep a Man Like You Satisfied)
"If I Had Wheels"	1966	—	—	—	—	—	—	—	—N/a
"Goin' Down the Road (Feelin' Bad)"	1966	—	—	36	—	—	—	—	My Heart's in the Country
"Fuel to the Flame"	1967	—	—	11	—	—	—	—	What Does It Take (To Keep a Man Like You Satisfied)
"What Does It Take (To Keep a Man Like You Satisfied)"	1967	— (Note: "What Does It Take (To Keep a Man Like You Satisfied)" did not enter the Hot 100, but peaked at number 21 on Bubbling Under Hot 100 Singles, which acts as a 25-song extension of the Hot 100.)	—	5	—	—	—	—	What Does It Take (To Keep a Man Like You Satisfied)
"Set Him Free" (Note: The 1967 release "Set Him Free" was a re-recording of the original 1959 single.)	1967	—	—	52	—	—	—	—	What Does It Take (To Keep a Man Like You Satisfied)
"Instinct for Survival"	1968	—	—	54	—	—	—	—	Skeeter
"There's a Fool Born Every Minute"	1968	—	—	16	—	—	18	—	Skeeter
"Timothy"	1968	—	—	—	—	—	—	—	I Can't Believe That It's All Over
"The Closest Thing to Love (I've Ever Seen)"	1968	—	—	66	—	—	—	—	The Closest Thing to Love
"Keep Baltimore Beautiful"	1969	—	—	—	—	—	—	—	The Closest Thing to Love
"Teach Me to Love You"	1969	—	—	—	—	—	—	—	"maryfrances"
"I'm a Lover (Not a Fighter)"	1969	—	—	9	—	—	7	—	A Place in the Country
"It's Hard to Be a Woman"	1970	—	—	65	—	—	—	—	It's Hard to Be a Woman
"We Need a Lot More of Jesus"	1970	—	—	69	—	—	—	—	It's Hard to Be a Woman
"Let's Get Together" (with George Hamilton IV)	1970	—	—	65	—	—	—	—	A Place in the Country
"Bridge Over Troubled Water"	1970	—	—	—	—	—	—	—	It's Hard to Be a Woman
"Bus Fare to Kentucky"	1971	—	—	21	—	—	30	—	Skeeter
"Love Takes a Lot of My Time"	1971	—	—	58	—	—	—	—	Love Takes a Lot of My Time
"One Tin Soldier"	1971	—	—	54	—	—	4	—	Bring It on Home
"Sad Situation"	1972	—	—	46	—	—	6	—	Skeeter
"A Hillbilly Song"	1972	—	—	—	—	—	76	—	The Hillbilly Singer
"I Can't Believe That It's All Over"	1973	— (Note: "I Can't Believe That It's All Over" did not enter the Hot 100, but peaked at number 1 on Bubbling Under Hot 100 Singles, which acts as a 25-song extension of the Hot 100.)	—	12	—	—	11	—	I Can't Believe That It's All Over
"Don't Forget to Remember"	1973	—	—	44	—	—	64	—	—N/a
"One More Time"	1974	—	—	65	—	—	—	—	—N/a
"Lovin' Touch"	1974	—	—	—	—	—	—	—	—N/a
"I Love Us"	1976	—	—	60	—	—	—	—	—N/a
"It's Love That I Feel"	1977	—	—	—	—	—	—	—	—N/a
"The End of the World" (re-recording)	1979	—	—	—	—	—	—	—	The Best of the Best of Skeeter Davis
"The Rose"	1980	—	—	—	—	—	—	—	—N/a
"—" denotes a recording that did not chart or was not released in that territory.

=== As a collaborative artist ===
List of singles, with selected chart positions, and other relevant details
Title	Year	Peak chart positions			Album
Title	Year	US Bub.	US Cou.	CAN Cou.	Album
"Rock-A-Bye Boogie" (with Porter Wagoner)	1962	—	—	—	Porter Wagoner and Skeeter Davis Sing Duets
"A Dear John Letter" (with Bobby Bare)	1965	14	11	—	Tunes for Two
"Chet's Tune" (credited as "Some of Chet's Friends")	1967	—	38	—	—N/a
"For Loving You" (with Don Bowman)	1967	—	72	18	—N/a
"Your Husband, My Wife" (with Bobby Bare)	1970	—	22	—	Your Husband, My Wife
"You Were Made for Me" (with Teddy Nelson)	1989	—	—	—	You Were Made for Me
"—" denotes a recording that did not chart or was not released in that territory.

== Other charted songs ==
List of singles, with selected chart positions, and other relevant details
Title	Year	Peak chart positions		Album	Notes
Title	Year	US	US Cou.	Album	Notes
"Something Precious"	1962	—	23	Skeeter Davis Sings the End of the World	(Note: B-side to "Where I Ought to Be".)
"How Much Can a Lonely Heart Stand"	1964	92	—	—N/a	(Note: B-side to "He Says the Same Things to Me".)
"—" denotes a recording that did not chart or was not released in that territory.

== Other appearances ==
List of non-single guest appearances, with other performing artists, showing year released and album name
Title	Year	Other artist(s)	Album	Ref.
"Santa Claus Is Comin' to Town"	1962	—N/a	Nashville Christmas Party	
"Hallelujah in My Heart"	1996	Philomena Begley; Margo; Liz Anderson	The Two Queens "Old Friends Share Old Memories"	
