= Porter Wagoner and Skeeter Davis Sing Duets =

Studio album by Porter Wagoner and Skeeter Davis
- Released: May 1962
- Recorded: February 1962
- Studio: RCA Victor Studios
- Genre: Country
- Label: RCA Victor
- Producer: Chet Atkins

Porter Wagoner chronology
A Slice of Life: Songs Happy 'n' Sad (1962)	Porter Wagoner and Skeeter Davis Sing Duets (1962)	The Porter Wagoner Show (1963)

Skeeter Davis chronology
Here's the Answer (1960)	Porter Wagoner and Skeeter Davis Sing Duets (1962)	Skeeter Davis Sings The End of the World (1963)

Singles from Porter Wagoner and Skeeter Davis Sing Duets
- 1. "Rock-A-Bye Boogie" Released: 1962

Porter Wagoner and Skeeter Davis Sing Duets is a studio album by American country artists, Porter Wagoner and Skeeter Davis. It was released in May 1962 on RCA Victor and contained 12 tracks. The album was collection of duet recordings between both performers. A total of 12 tracks comprised the album, most of which were covers of songs first recorded by other music artists. The album was given positive reviews at the time of its release.

== Background and content ==
Both Porter Wagoner and Skeeter Davis both had successful solo careers in the country genre. Both were also signed to the RCA Victor label. Wagoner first gained an RCA contract in the mid 1950s and had first top ten single with 1955's "A Satisfied Mind". Wagoner continued having charting singles, but did not become more successful until the early sixties when his own television show became successful. Skeeter Davis was formerly one half of the duo, The Davis Sisters. After a car accident that killed the duo's second member, Davis began a successful solo career with RCA. In the late 1950s and early sixties, she reached the country top ten with songs like "Set Him Free" and "My Last Date (With You)".

Wagoner and Davis first collaborated together for the album's recording. It was produced by Chet Atkins, who both recorded the artists in their individual careers at RCA. The sessions for the album took place in February 1962 at RCA Victor Studios, located in Nashville, Tennessee. The entire project was a collection of duets between the pair. Most of its tracks were covers of previously recorded country songs. Among them was The Davis Sisters's original "Rock-A-Bye Boogie". Among the album's other cover tunes were "Have I Told You Lately That I Love You", "Gonna Find Me a Bluebird" and "A Little Bitty Tear".

== Release and reception ==
Porter Wagoner and Skeeter Davis Sing Duets was originally released in May 1962 on the RCA Victor label. It was originally distributed as a vinyl LP, containing six recordings on either side of the record. Upon its release, the album was given critical attention by Billboard magazine. In June 1962, the publication named it among its "Spotlight Albums of the Week". Critics noted the album's mix of traditional country along with a defined "string section". The further added, "Their singing is first-rate and sure to score with country buyers." The publication also highlighted the album track "Above and Beyond" on a separate page of the same issue.

One single was issued in the original release: "Rock-A-Bye Boogie". The single was issued through RCA Victor in Germany. In 2013, the album was re-released in a digital format via Rockabilly Records. The re-release consisted of a different track listing than the original LP version. In 2017, the album was re-released again as a vinyl LP. Instead however, it was issued in The Netherlands through the Vinyl Passion label. A different track listing was also included and bonus tracks were added.

== Track listings ==
=== Vinyl version ===
Side one
No.	Title	Length
1.	"Rock-A-Bye Boogie"	1:48
2.	"Have I Told You Lately That I Love You"	2:28
3.	"Above and Beyond"	1:59
4.	"Heaven Help Me"	2:32
5.	"A Little Bitty Tear"	2:03
6.	"Sorrow's Tearing Down the House (That Happiness Built)"	2:22

Side two
No.	Title	Length
1.	"Gonna Find Me a Bluebird"	2:35
2.	"Violet and a Rose"	2:39
3.	"There's Always One (Who Loves a Lot)"	2:04
4.	"We Could"	2:11
5.	"My Greatest Weakness"	1:51
6.	"Anymore"	2:45

=== Digital version ===
Music download and streaming version
No.	Title	Length
1.	"Rock-A-Bye Boogie"	1:54
2.	"Anymore"	2:50
3.	"My Greatest Weakness"	1:57
4.	"We Could"	2:17
5.	"There's Always One"	2:09
6.	"Have I Told You Lately That I Love You"	2:34
7.	"Violet and a Rose"	2:45
8.	"Gonna Find Me a Bluebird"	2:41
9.	"Sorrow's Tearing Down the House"	2:27
10.	"A Little Bitty Tear"	2:03
11.	"Heaven Help Me"	2:38
12.	"Above and Beyond"	2:03

=== Vinyl re-release ===
Side A
No.	Title	Length
1.	"Rock-A-Bye Boogie"	–
2.	"Have I Told You Lately That I Love You"	–
3.	"Above and Beyond"	–
4.	"Heaven Help Me"	–
5.	"A Little Bitty Tear"	–
6.	"Sorrow's Tearing Down the House (That Happiness Built)"	–
7.	"Gonna Find Me a Bluebird"	–
8.	"Violet and a Rose"	–
9.	"There's Always One (Who Loves a Lot)"	–
10.	"We Could"	–

Side B
No.	Title	Length
1.	"My Greatest Weakness"	–
2.	"Anymore"	–

Side B Bonus tracks (Skeeter Davis)
No.	Title	Length
3.	"The End of the World"	–
4.	"Am I That Easy to Forget"	–
5.	"My Last Date (With You)"	–
6.	"(I Can't Help You) I'm Falling Too"	–
7.	"Your Cheatin' Heart"	–
8.	"Optimistic"	–
9.	"Rock-A-Bye Boogie" (The Davis Sisters)	–

== Release history ==
Region	Date	Format	Label	Ref.
North America	May 1962	Vinyl	RCA Victor	
North America	June 5, 2013	Music download; streaming	Rockabilly Records	
Netherlands	2017	Vinyl	Vinyl Passion	
