= Something Precious =

Single by Skeeter Davis

from the album Skeeter Davis Sings The End of the World
- A-side: "Where I Ought to Be"
- Released: January 1962
- Recorded: November 1961
- Studio: RCA Studio B, Nashville
- Genre: Country pop; Nashville Sound
- Length: 2:09
- Label: RCA Victor
- Songwriter(s): Lorene Mann
- Producer(s): Chet Atkins

Skeeter Davis singles chronology
"Optimistic" (1962)	"Something Precious" (1962)	"The Little Music Box" (1962)

"Something Precious" is a song composed by Lorene Mann that was originally recorded by American country artist, Skeeter Davis. It was originally released as the B-side to her 1962 single, "Where I Ought to Be". The song itself reached the top 30 of the American country songs chart in 1962, a stand-along chart position from the A-side.

== Background, recording and release ==
Skeeter Davis had made a successful solo career in the country genre following the disbanding of her duo, The Davis Sisters. Since 1958, she had regularly made the top ten and 20 of the American country chart with singles like "Set Him Free", "My Last Date (With You)" and "Optimistic". One of her next releases was the 1962 single, "Where I Ought to Be". It was backed on the B-side by the track, "Something Precious". The song was written by Lorene Mann.

"Where I Ought to Be" (backed with "Something Precious") was released as a single by RCA Victor in January 1962. The A-side reached the top ten of the American Billboard Hot Country Songs chart in 1962. Unlike her other B-side releases, "Something Precious" charted separately from its A-side. Around this time, the B-side reached number 23 on the Billboard country chart. The track was released on Davis's fourth studio album titled Skeeter Davis Sings The End of the World (1963).

== Track listing ==
7" vinyl single

- "Where I Ought to Be" – 2:43
- "Something Precious" – 2:09

== Chart performance ==
Chart (1962)	Peak position
US Hot Country Songs (Billboard)	23
