= The Little Music Box =

Single by Skeeter Davis
- B-side: "The Final Step"
- Released: July 1962
- Recorded: November 1961
- Studio: RCA Victor Studios
- Genre: Country pop; Nashville Sound
- Length: 2:16
- Label: RCA Victor
- Songwriter(s): Skeeter Davis; Rudy Thacker
- Producer(s): Chet Atkins

Skeeter Davis singles chronology
"Where I Ought to Be" (1962)	"The Little Music Box" (1962)	"The End of the World" (1962)

"The Little Music Box" is a song originally recorded by American country artist, Skeeter Davis. It was composed by Davis herself, along with Rudy Thacker. It was released as a single in 1962 via RCA Victor and reached the top 30 of the American country songs chart.

== Background, recording and release ==
Skeeter Davis had recently embarked on a solo career after the death of Betty Jack Davis. Together, both women made up the country duo, The Davis Sisters. In 1957, Skeeter had her first solo success with the single "Lost to a Geisha Girl". Over the next several years she had commercial success with the top ten country songs "(I Can't Help You) I'm Falling Too", "My Last Date (With You)", "Where I Ought to Be" and "Optimistic. Among these charting singles was 1962's "The Little Music Box". The song was penned by Davis, along with Rudy Thacker. It was recorded at the RCA Victor Studios, located in Nashville, Tennessee. Recorded in November 1961, the song was produced by Chet Atkins.

"The Little Music Box" was released as a single by RCA Victor in July 1962. The song later reached number 22 on the American Billboard Hot Country Songs chart in late 1962. It was her first single in her career to chart outside of the country top 20. It was also Davis's tenth entry on the Country Songs chart. The track was not originally issued on an album at the time of its release. It was later included on the 1965 compilation by RCA Camden titled Blueberry Hill.

== Track listing ==
7" vinyl single

- "The Little Music Box" – 2:16
- "The Final Step" – 2:36

== Chart performance ==
Chart (1962)	Peak position
US Hot Country Songs (Billboard)	22
