= I'll Sing You a Song and Harmonize Too =

Studio album by Skeeter Davis
- Released: November 1959
- Recorded: May 1958 – September 1959
- Genre: Country, Nashville sound
- Label: RCA Victor
- Producer: Chet Atkins

Skeeter Davis chronology
I'll Sing You a Song and Harmonize Too (1959)	Here's the Answer (1960)

Singles from I'll Sing You a Song and Harmonize Too
- 1. "I Forgot More Than You'll Ever Know" Released: August 1958; 2. "Set Him Free" Released: February 1959; 3. "Am I That Easy to Forget" Released: January 1960

Professional ratings
Review scores
Source	Rating
Allmusic	4/5 stars

I'll Sing You a Song and Harmonize Too is the debut studio album by American country artist Skeeter Davis. The album was released in November 1959 by RCA Victor and was produced by Chet Atkins. It signified Davis' first solo album ever released after departing from the duo, The Davis Sisters.

== Background and content ==
I'll Sing You a Song and Harmonize Too was recorded in three recording sessions at the RCA Victor studio in Nashville, Tennessee, United States. The first session took place in May 1958, followed by January 30, 1959, and then ending in September 1959. The album took its name from Chet Atkins' idea of harmonizing Davis' vocals with herself. Atkins used this technique because Davis' vocals were not suited to singing lead vocals, as she had previously sung harmony as part of The Davis Sisters. By using the technique of harmonizing with herself, it gave her voice a fuller sound and production. The debut record contained twelve tracks of material. Besides a selected number of new songs ("Am I That Easy to Forget", "Set Him Free", "Have You Seen This Man", and "Devil's Doll") the rest of the album contained cover versions of songs. It included cover versions of Hank Williams' "Your Cheatin' Heart", Jan Howard's "The One You Slip Around With", and Buck Owens' "Under Your Spell Again". It also included a solo version of The Davis Sisters' 1953 hit, "I Forgot More Than You'll Ever Know".

The album was originally released as an LP album with six songs on each side of the record. Allmusic rated the album and gave it four out of five stars, without an official written review provided.

== Release ==
I'll Sing You a Song and Harmonize Too spawned three singles between 1958 and 1960. The first single released was the cover version of "I Forgot More Than You'll Ever Know", released in August 1958. The single failed to chart. "Set Him Free" was released as the second single in February 1959 and peaked at #5 on the Billboard Magazine Hot Country Songs chart, becoming Davis' first Top 10 hit. The third and final single was "Am I That Easy to Forget", which was released in January 1960. The single peaked at #11 on the Billboard Magazine Hot Country Songs chart that same year. The single would later become a hit for Debbie Reynolds, Jim Reeves, and Engelbert Humperdinck. The album was officially issued in November 1959 on RCA Victor Records, but failed to enter any Billboard chart (Billboard's country album chart did not debut until 1964).

== Track listing ==
Side one
No.	Title	Writer(s)	Length
1.	"Just When I Needed You"	Jack Anglin, Clyde Baum, Johnnie Wright	2:45
2.	"Am I That Easy to Forget"	Carl Belew, W.S. Stevenson	2:07
3.	"Have You Seen This Man"	Skeeter Davis, Justin Tubb, Marie Wilson	2:08
4.	"Your Cheatin' Heart"	Hank Williams	2:44
5.	"The One You Slip Around With"	Harlan Howard, Charles Owen	2:42
6.	"Devil's Doll"	Cindy Walker	2:09

Side two
No.	Title	Writer(s)	Length
1.	"Chained to a Memory"	Jenny Lou Carson	2:37
2.	"I Forgot More Than You'll Ever Know"	Cecil Null	2:33
3.	"Standing in the Shadows"	Ray Price	2:27
4.	"Under Your Spell Again"	Buck Owens, Dusty Rhodes	2:35
5.	"Set Him Free"	Davis, Helen Moyers, Wilson	2:13
6.	"Let Those Brown Eyes Smile at Me"	Rusty Nail	2:46

== Personnel ==
- Chet Atkins – guitar
- Floyd Cramer – piano
- Skeeter Davis – harmony vocals, lead vocals
- Jimmy Day – steel guitar
- Ray Edenton – rhythm guitar
- Hank Garland – guitar
- Buddy Harman – drums
- Bud Issac – steel guitar
- Tommy Jackson – fiddle
- Grady Martin – guitar
- Bob Moore – bass
- Donald Slayman – fiddle
- Velma Smith – rhythm guitar

== Sales chart positions ==
Singles

Year	Song	Chart positions
Year	Song	US Country
1959	"Set Him Free"	5
1960	"Am I That Easy to Forget"	11
