= What Am I Gonna Do with You (Skeeter Davis song) =

Single by Skeeter Davis
- B-side: "Don't Let Me Stand in Your Way"
- Released: October 1964
- Recorded: June 1964
- Studio: RCA Victor, Nashville, Tennessee
- Genre: Country; Nashville Sound
- Length: 2:45
- Label: RCA Victor
- Songwriter(s): Gerry Goffin; Russ Titelman
- Producer(s): Chet Atkins

Skeeter Davis singles chronology
"Let Me Get Close to You" (1964)	"What Am I Gonna Do with You" (1964)	"I Can't Help It (If I'm Still in Love with You)" (1965)

"What Am I Gonna Do with You" is a song originally recorded by American country artist, Skeeter Davis. It was composed by Gerry Goffin and Russ Titelman. In 1964, it was released as a single via RCA Victor and reached the top 40 of the American country music chart. Although not originally released on album, it later appeared on the re-release of her sixth studio album titled Let Me Get Close to You. Other artists later recorded the song, most notably Lesley Gore, who released the song on her 1965 album My Town, My Guy & Me.

== Background, recording and release ==
Skeeter Davis had reached the zenith of commercial success with the 1963 single, "The End of the World". The song reached number two on the country charts and crossed over to top ten positions on the pop, R&B and adult contemporary charts. She followed it with another top ten crossover single titled "I Can't Stay Mad at You", which was written by Gerry Goffin. Davis recorded several more Goffin tunes that incorporated a "girl group" sound. Among these Goffin-penned songs was 1964's "What Am I Gonna Do with You". It also included writing credits from Russ Titelman. It was recorded in July 1964 at RCA Victor Studios, located in Nashville, Tennessee. The session was produced by Chet Atkins.

"What Am I Gonna Do with You" was released as a single by RCA Victor in July 1964. The song peaked at number 38 on the American Billboard Hot Country Songs chart in late 1964. It was the third single in her career to chart only in the top 40. It was also her seventeenth chart entry. Unlike her other singles from the era, "What Am I Gonna Do with You" did not enter the Billboard Hot 100. Instead, it reached the 25-extension chart titled the Bubbling Under Hot 100, climbing to number 23. The album was later included on the re-release Davis's sixth studio album titled Let Me Get Close to You.

== Track listing ==
7" vinyl single

- "What Am I Gonna Do with You" – 2:45
- "Don't Let Me Stand in Your Way" – 2:22

== Chart performance ==
Chart (1964)	Peak position
US Bubbling Under Hot 100 (Billboard)	23
US Hot Country Songs (Billboard)	38
