= Bus Fare to Kentucky =

Single by Skeeter Davis

from the album Skeeter
- B-side: "From Her Arms into Mine"
- Released: February 1971
- Recorded: January 1971
- Studio: RCA Victor Studios
- Genre: Country
- Length: 2:55
- Label: RCA Victor
- Songwriter: Ronny Light
- Producer: Ronny Light

Skeeter Davis singles chronology
"Bridge Over Troubled Water" (1970)	"Bus Fare to Kentucky" (1971)	"Love Takes a Lot of My Time" (1971)

"Bus Fare to Kentucky" is a song composed by Ronny Light and originally recorded by American country artist, Skeeter Davis. In 1971, it was released as a single via RCA Victor and reached the top 40 of the American and Canadian country music charts. It was released on Davis's 1971 studio album titled Skeeter

== Background, recording and release ==
Skeeter Davis reached her commercial career peak in the 1960s with crossover country pop songs like "The End of the World" and "I Can't Stay Mad at You". As the decade progressed, Davis's targeted her music and career towards the country music audience. This trend continued into the 1970s when Davis's singles regularly made positions mostly on the country charts. This included the song "Bus Fare to Kentucky", which was written and produced by Ronny Light. Davis recorded the track in January 1971 at the RCA Victor Studios, located in Nashville, Tennessee.

"Bus Fare to Kentucky" was released as a single by RCA Victor in February 1971. The song peaked at number 21 on the American Billboard Hot Country Songs chart later that year. It was Davis's highest-charting single since 1970's "I'm a Lover (Not a Fighter)". The song was her third entry on Canada's RPM Country Tracks survey, peaking at number 30 in 1971. It was included on Davis's 1971 studio album titled Skeeter. In 1993, Davis published her autobiography, which was named for her 1971 single.

== Track listing ==
7" vinyl single

- "Bus Fare to Kentucky" – 2:55
- "From Her Arms into Mine" – 2:05

== Chart performance ==
Chart (1971)	Peak position
Canada Country Singles (RPM)	30
US Hot Country Songs (Billboard)	21
