= Grammy Award for Best Female Country Vocal Performance =

Award category in the Grammys

- Awarded for: Quality of female vocal performance in country music.
- Country: United States
- Presented by: National Academy of Recording Arts and Sciences
- First award: 1965
- Final award: 2011
- Website: grammy.com

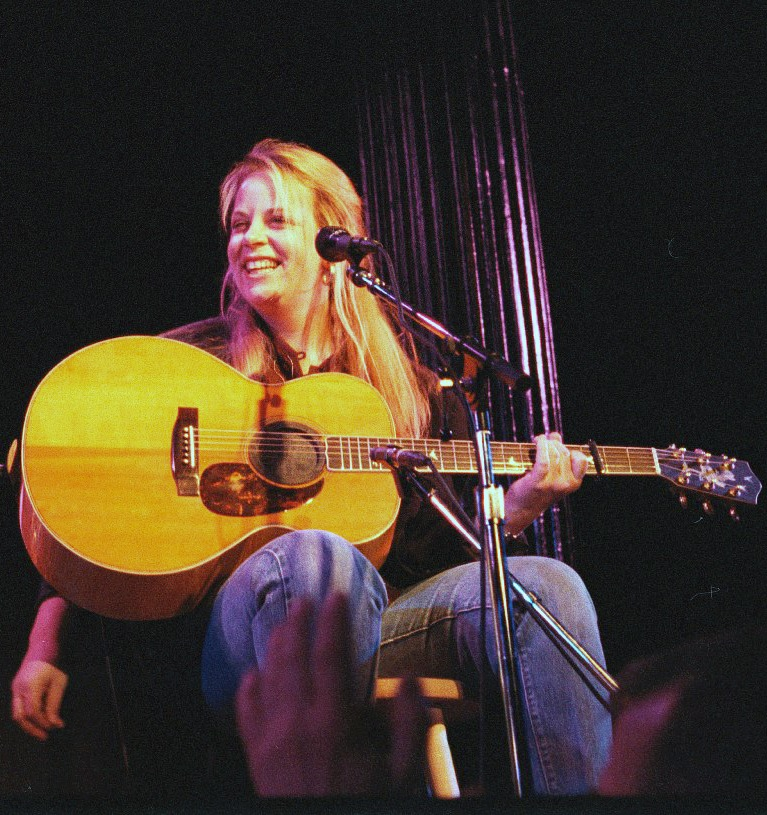
Four-time winner Mary Chapin Carpenter

The Grammy Award for Best Female Country Vocal Performance was first awarded in 1965, to Dottie West. The award has had several minor name changes:

- From 1965 to 1967, the award was known as Best Country & Western Vocal Performance - Female
- In 1968, it was awarded as Best Country & Western Solo Vocal Performance, Female
- From 1969 to 1994, it was awarded as Best Country Vocal Performance, Female
- From 1995 to 2011, it was awarded as Best Female Country Vocal Performance

The award was discontinued after the 2011 award season in a major overhaul of Grammy categories. From 2012 to the present, all solo performances (male, female and instrumental) in the country category are recognized in the newly formed Best Country Solo Performance category.

Years reflect the year in which the Grammy Awards were presented, for works released in the previous year.

== Recipients ==
=== 1960s ===
Year	Artist	Work
1965	Dottie West	"Here Comes My Baby"
1965	Skeeter Davis	"He Says the Same Things to Me"
1965	Wanda Jackson	"Two Sides of Wanda"
1965	Jean Shepard	"Second Fiddle (To an Old Guitar)"
1965	Connie Smith	"Once a Day"
1966	Jody Miller	"Queen of the House"
1966	Molly Bee	"Single Girl Again"
1966	Wilma Burgess	"Baby"
1966	Skeeter Davis	"Sun Glasses"
1966	Dottie West	"Before the Ring on Your Finger Turns Green"
1967	Jeannie Seely	"Don't Touch Me"
1967	Jan Howard	"Evil on Your Mind"
1967	Loretta Lynn	"Don't Come Home a Drinkin' (With Lovin' on Your Mind)"
1967	Connie Smith	"Ain't Had No Lovin'"
1967	Dottie West	"Would You Hold It Against Me"
1968	Tammy Wynette	"I Don't Wanna Play House"
1968	Liz Anderson	"Mama Spank"
1968	Skeeter Davis	"What Does it Take"
1968	Connie Smith	"Cincinnati, Ohio"
1968	Dottie West	"Paper Mansions"
1969	Jeannie C. Riley	"Harper Valley P.T.A."
1969	Lynn Anderson	"Big Girls Don't Cry"
1969	Jan Howard	"My Son"
1969	Dottie West	"Country Girl"
1969	Tammy Wynette	"D-I-V-O-R-C-E"

=== 1970s ===
Year	Artist	Work
1970	Tammy Wynette	"Stand By Your Man"
1970	Lynn Anderson	"That's a No No"
1970	Jeannie C. Riley	"The Backside of Dallas"
1970	Connie Smith	"Ribbon of Darkness"
1970	Diana Trask	"I Fall to Pieces"
1971	Lynn Anderson	"Rose Garden"
1971	Wanda Jackson	"A Woman Lives for Love"
1971	Dolly Parton	"Mule Skinner Blues"
1971	Jean Shepard	"Then He Touched Me"
1971	Tammy Wynette	"Run Woman Run"
1972	Sammi Smith	"Help Me Make It Through the Night"
1972	Lynn Anderson	"How Can I Unlove You"
1972	Jody Miller	"He's So Fine"
1972	Dolly Parton	"Joshua"
1972	Tammy Wynette	Good Lovin' (Makes It Right)
1973	Donna Fargo	"The Happiest Girl in the Whole USA"
1973	Skeeter Davis	"One Tin Soldier"
1973	Loretta Lynn	"One's on the Way"
1973	Dolly Parton	"Touch Your Woman"
1973	Tanya Tucker	"Delta Dawn"
1973	Tammy Wynette	"My Man"
1974	Olivia Newton-John	"Let Me Be There"
1974	Barbara Fairchild	"Teddy Bear Song"
1974	Marie Osmond	"Paper Roses"
1974	Dottie West	"Country Sunshine"
1974	Tammy Wynette	"Kids Say the Darnest Things"
1975	Anne Murray	"A Love Song"
1975	Dolly Parton	"Jolene"
1975	Tanya Tucker	"Would You Lay with Me (In a Field of Stone)"
1975	Dottie West	"Last Time I Saw Him"
1975	Tammy Wynette	"Woman to Woman"
1976	Linda Ronstadt	"I Can't Help It (If I'm Still in Love with You)"
1976	Jessi Colter	"I'm Not Lisa"
1976	Emmylou Harris	"If I Could Only Win Your Love"
1976	Loretta Lynn	"The Pill"
1976	Dolly Parton	"Jolene" (Live from In Concert)
1977	Emmylou Harris	Elite Hotel
1977	Crystal Gayle	"I'll Get Over You"
1977	Dolly Parton	"All I Can Do"
1977	Mary Kay Place	Tonite at the Capri Lounge: Loretta Hagers
1977	Tammy Wynette	"'Til I Can Make It on My Own"
1978	Crystal Gayle	"Don't It Make My Brown Eyes Blue"
1978	Janie Fricke	"What're You Doing Tonight"
1978	Emmylou Harris	"Making Believe"
1978	Barbara Mandrell	"After the Lovin'"
1978	Dolly Parton	"(Your Love Has Lifted Me) Higher and Higher"
1979	Dolly Parton	Here You Come Again
1979	Crystal Gayle	"Talking in Your Sleep"
1979	Emmylou Harris	Quarter Moon in a Ten Cent Town
1979	Barbara Mandrell	"Sleeping Single in a Double Bed"
1979	Anne Murray	"Walk Right Back"

=== 1980s ===
Year	Artist	Work
1980	Emmylou Harris	Blue Kentucky Girl
1980	Crystal Gayle	We Should Be Together
1980	Brenda Lee	"Tell Me What It's Like"
1980	Barbara Mandrell	Just for the Record
1980	Billie Jo Spears	"I Will Survive"
1981	Anne Murray	"Could I Have This Dance"
1981	Crystal Gayle	"If You Ever Change Your Mind"
1981	Emmylou Harris	Roses in the Snow
1981	Barbara Mandrell	"The Best of Strangers"
1981	Sissy Spacek	"Coal Miner's Daughter"
1982	Dolly Parton	"9 to 5"
1982	Rosanne Cash	Seven Year Ache
1982	Terri Gibbs	Somebody's Knockin'
1982	Barbara Mandrell	"I Was Country When Country Wasn't Cool"
1982	Juice Newton	"Queen of Hearts"
1983	Juice Newton	"Break It to Me Gently"
1983	Rosanne Cash	"Ain't No Money"
1983	Emmylou Harris	Cimarron
1983	Dolly Parton	"I Will Always Love You"
1983	Sylvia	"Nobody"
1984	Anne Murray	"A Little Good News"
1984	Deborah Allen	"Baby I Lied"
1984	Crystal Gayle	"Baby, What About You"
1984	Emmylou Harris	Last Date
1984	Dolly Parton	Burlap & Satin
1985	Emmylou Harris	"In My Dreams"
1985	Janie Fricke	"Your Heart's Not in It"
1985	Crystal Gayle	"The Sound of Goodbye"
1985	Anne Murray	Heart over Mind
1985	Dolly Parton	"Tennessee Homesick Blues"
1986	Rosanne Cash	"I Don't Know Why You Don't Want Me"
1986	Janie Fricke	"She's Single Again"
1986	Emmylou Harris	The Ballad of Sally Rose
1986	Juice Newton	"You Make Me Want to Make You Mine"
1986	Dolly Parton	Real Love
1987	Reba McEntire	"Whoever's in New England"
1987	Crystal Gayle	"Cry"
1987	Holly Dunn	"Daddy's Hands"
1987	Emmylou Harris	"Today I Started Loving You Again"
1987	Kathy Mattea	"Love at the Five and Dime"
1988	K. T. Oslin	"80s Ladies"
1988	Rosanne Cash	King's Record Shop
1988	Emmylou Harris	Angel Band
1988	Reba McEntire	"The Last One to Know"
1988	Tanya Tucker	"Love Me Like You Used To"
1989	K. T. Oslin	"Hold Me"
1989	Emmylou Harris	"Back in Baby's Arms"
1989	k.d. lang	"I'm Down to My Last Cigarette"
1989	Reba McEntire	Reba
1989	Tanya Tucker	"Strong Enough to Bend"

=== 1990s ===
Year	Artist	Work
1990	k.d. lang	Absolute Torch and Twang
1990	Rosanne Cash	"I Don't Want to Spoil the Party"
1990	Emmylou Harris	Bluebird
1990	Kathy Mattea	Willow in the Wind
1990	Dolly Parton	"Why'd You Come in Here Lookin' Like That"
1991	Kathy Mattea	"Where've You Been"
1991	Mary Chapin Carpenter	"Quittin' Time"
1991	Carlene Carter	I Fell in Love
1991	Reba McEntire	"You Lie"
1991	K. T. Oslin	"Come Next Monday"
1992	Mary Chapin Carpenter	"Down at the Twist and Shout"
1992	Kathy Mattea	Time Passes By
1992	Reba McEntire	For My Broken Heart
1992	Tanya Tucker	"Down to My Last Teardrop"
1992	Trisha Yearwood	"She's in Love with the Boy"
1993	Mary Chapin Carpenter	"I Feel Lucky"
1993	Wynonna Judd	Wynonna
1993	Reba McEntire	"The Greatest Man I Never Knew"
1993	Lorrie Morgan	"Something in Red"
1993	Pam Tillis	"Maybe It Was Memphis"
1994	Mary Chapin Carpenter	"Passionate Kisses"
1994	Emmylou Harris	"High Powered Love"
1994	Tanya Tucker	"Soon"
1994	Wynonna Judd	"Only Love"
1994	Trisha Yearwood	"Walkaway Joe"
1995	Mary Chapin Carpenter	"Shut Up and Kiss Me"
1995	Wynonna Judd	"Is It Over Yet"
1995	Patty Loveless	"How Can I Help You Say Goodbye"
1995	Martina McBride	"Independence Day"
1995	Reba McEntire	"She Thinks His Name Was John"
1996	Alison Krauss	"Baby Now That I've Found You"
1996	Patty Loveless	"You Don't Even Know Who I Am"
1996	Martina McBride	"Safe in the Arms of Love"
1996	Pam Tillis	"Mi Vida Loca (My Crazy Life)"
1996	Shania Twain	"Any Man of Mine"
1997	LeAnn Rimes	"Blue"
1997	Mary Chapin Carpenter	"Let Me into Your Heart"
1997	Deana Carter	"Strawberry Wine"
1997	Alison Krauss	"Baby Mine"
1997	Trisha Yearwood	"Believe Me Baby (I Lied)"
1998	Trisha Yearwood	"How Do I Live"
1998	Deana Carter	"Did I Shave My Legs For This?"
1998	Patty Loveless	"The Trouble with the Truth"
1998	LeAnn Rimes	"How Do I Live"
1998	Pam Tillis	"All the Good Ones Are Gone"
1999	Shania Twain	"You're Still the One"
1999	Emmylou Harris	"Love Still Remains"
1999	Faith Hill	"This Kiss"
1999	Lee Ann Womack	"A Little Past Little Rock"
1999	Trisha Yearwood	"There Goes My Baby"

=== 2000s ===
Year	Artist	Work
2000	Shania Twain	"Man! I Feel Like a Woman!"
2000	Emmylou Harris	"Ordinary Heart"
2000	Faith Hill	"Let Me Let Go"
2000	Alison Krauss	"Forget About It"
2000	Martina McBride	"I Love You"
2001	Faith Hill	"Breathe"
2001	Jo Dee Messina	"That's the Way"
2001	Dolly Parton	"Travelin' Prayer"
2001	Lee Ann Womack	"I Hope You Dance"
2001	Trisha Yearwood	"Real Live Woman"
2002	Dolly Parton	"Shine"
2002	Sheryl Crow	"Long Gone Lonesome Blues"
2002	Jamie O'Neal	"There Is No Arizona"
2002	Lucinda Williams	"Cold, Cold Heart"
2002	Trisha Yearwood	"I Would've Loved You Anyway"
2003	Faith Hill	"Cry"
2003	Martina McBride	"Blessed"
2003	Dolly Parton	"Dagger Through the Heart"
2003	Lucinda Williams	"Lately"
2003	Lee Ann Womack	"Something Worth Leaving Behind"
2004	June Carter Cash	"Keep on the Sunny Side"
2004	Patty Loveless	"On Your Way Home"
2004	Martina McBride	"This One's for the Girls"
2004	Dolly Parton	"I'm Gone"
2004	Shania Twain	"Forever and for Always"
2005	Gretchen Wilson	"Redneck Woman"
2005	Alison Krauss	"You Will Be My Ain True Love"
2005	Loretta Lynn	"Miss Being Mrs."
2005	Martina McBride	"In My Daughter's Eyes"
2005	Shania Twain	"She's Not Just a Pretty Face"
2006	Emmylou Harris	"The Connection"
2006	Faith Hill	"Mississippi Girl"
2006	Gretchen Wilson	"All Jacked Up"
2006	Lee Ann Womack	"I May Hate Myself in the Morning"
2006	Trisha Yearwood	"Georgia Rain"
2007	Carrie Underwood	"Jesus, Take the Wheel"
2007	Miranda Lambert	"Kerosene"
2007	Martina McBride	"I Still Miss Someone"
2007	LeAnn Rimes	"Something's Gotta Give"
2007	Gretchen Wilson	"I Don't Feel Like Loving You Today"
2008	Carrie Underwood	"Before He Cheats"
2008	Alison Krauss	"Simple Love"
2008	Miranda Lambert	"Famous in a Small Town"
2008	LeAnn Rimes	"Nothin' Better to Do"
2008	Trisha Yearwood	"Heaven, Heartache and the Power of Love"
2009	Carrie Underwood	"Last Name"
2009	Martina McBride	"For These Times"
2009	LeAnn Rimes	"What I Cannot Change"
2009	Lee Ann Womack	"Last Call"
2009	Trisha Yearwood	"This Is Me You're Talking To"

=== 2010s ===
Year	Artist	Work
2010	Taylor Swift	"White Horse"
2010	Miranda Lambert	"Dead Flowers"
2010	Martina McBride	"I Just Call You Mine"
2010	Carrie Underwood	"Just a Dream"
2010	Lee Ann Womack	"Solitary Thinkin'"
2011	Miranda Lambert	"The House That Built Me"
2011	Jewel	"Satisfied"
2011	LeAnn Rimes	"Swingin'"
2011	Carrie Underwood	"Temporary Home"
2011	Gretchen Wilson	"I'd Love to Be Your Last"

== Multiple wins ==
4 wins

- Mary Chapin Carpenter
- Emmylou Harris

3 wins

- Anne Murray
- Dolly Parton
- Carrie Underwood

2 wins

- Faith Hill
- K. T. Oslin
- Shania Twain
- Tammy Wynette

== Multiple nominations ==
18 nominations

- Emmylou Harris
- Dolly Parton

10 nominations

- Trisha Yearwood

9 nominations

- Martina McBride
- Tammy Wynette

8 nominations

- Crystal Gayle

7 nominations

- Reba McEntire
- Dottie West

6 nominations

- Mary Chapin Carpenter
- LeAnn Rimes
- Tanya Tucker
- Lee Ann Womack

5 nominations

- Rosanne Cash
- Faith Hill
- Alison Krauss
- Barbara Mandrell
- Anne Murray
- Shania Twain
- Carrie Underwood

4 nominations

- Lynn Anderson
- Skeeter Davis
- Miranda Lambert
- Patty Loveless
- Loretta Lynn
- Kathy Mattea
- Connie Smith
- Gretchen Wilson

3 nominations

- Janie Fricke
- Wynonna Judd
- Juice Newton
- K. T. Oslin
- Pam Tillis

2 nominations

- Deana Carter
- Jan Howard
- Wanda Jackson
- k.d. lang
- Jody Miller
- Jeannie C. Riley
- Jean Shepard
- Lucinda Williams

== See also ==
- Grammy Award for Best Male Country Vocal Performance
- Grammy Award for Best Country Solo Performance
