= Why So Lonely (disambiguation) =

"Why So Lonely" is a song by Wonder Girls. The phrase may also refer to:

- Why So Lonely?, an album by Skeeter Davis as well as its title track
- "Why So Lonely", a song by the 3rd and the Mortal from the album Tears Laid in Earth
