= Homebreaker =

Single by Skeeter Davis
- B-side: "Give Me Death"
- Released: July 1959
- Recorded: July 1, 1959; Nashville, Tennessee, U.S
- Genre: Country, Nashville Sound
- Label: RCA Victor
- Songwriter(s): Skeeter Davis, Marie Wilson
- Producer(s): Chet Atkins

Skeeter Davis singles chronology
"Set Him Free" (1959)	"Homebreaker" (1959)	"Am I That Easy to Forget" (1960)

"Homebreaker" is a song written by Skeeter Davis and Marie Wilson. In 1959, Skeeter Davis recorded and released the song as a single for RCA Victor.

"Homebreaker" was recorded and released as a single in July 1959 at the RCA Victor Studio in Nashville, Tennessee, United States. and peaked at number fifteen on the Billboard Magazine Hot C&W Sides chart later that year. The single was Davis' third major hit single on the country chart. The song was not originally issued onto an official album.

== Chart performance ==
Chart (1959)	Peak position
U.S. Billboard Hot C&W Sides	15
