= Sad Situation =

Single by Skeeter Davis

from the album Skeeter
- B-side: "All I Ever Wanted Was Love"
- Released: April 1972
- Recorded: January 1971
- Studio: RCA Victor Studios
- Genre: Country
- Length: 2:55
- Label: RCA Victor
- Songwriter(s): Clyde Pitts
- Producer(s): Ronny Light

Skeeter Davis singles chronology
"One Tin Soldier" (1971)	"Sad Situation" (1972)	"A Hillbilly Song" (1972)

"Sad Situation" is a song composed by Clyde Pitts that was originally recorded by American country artist, Skeeter Davis. In 1972, it was released as a single via RCA Victor and reached the top ten of the Canadian country music chart. It was also released on Davis's 1971 studio album titled Skeeter

== Background, recording and release ==
Skeeter Davis was at her commercial peak in the 1960s with crossover pop singles like 1963's "The End of the World". As the decade progressed, Davis targeted her music purely towards the country market. Her songs made the country charts in North America regularity as she entered the next decade. Among these singles was 1972's "Sad Situation", composed by Clyde Pitts. The song was first cut at the RCA Victor Studios in January 1971 with Ronny Light serving as the session producer.

"Sad Situation" was released as a single by RCA Victor in April 1972. In her main market (the United States), the song only peaked at number 46 on the Billboard Hot Country Songs chart. Yet in Canada, the song was more successful and popular. It became her second top ten single the Canadian RPM Country chart, peaking at number six in 1972. It was her Davis's third top ten hit and fifth charting single in Canada. The track was also included on Davis's 1971 studio album titled Skeeter.

== Track listing ==
7" vinyl single

- "Sad Situation" – 2:55
- "All I Ever Wanted Was Love" – 2:02

== Chart performance ==
Chart (1972)	Peak position
Canada Country Singles (RPM)	6
US Hot Country Songs (Billboard)	46
