= The Hands You're Holding Now =

Single by Skeeter Davis
- B-side: "Someday, Someday"
- Released: March 1961
- Recorded: March 1961
- Studio: RCA Victor Studio A, New York, New York, U.S.
- Genre: Country, Nashville Sound
- Label: RCA Victor
- Songwriter: Marty Robbins
- Producer: Chet Atkins

Skeeter Davis singles chronology
| "My Last Date (With You)" (1960) | "The Hands You're Holding Now" (1961) | "Optimistic" (1962) |

"The Hands You're Holding Now" is a song written by Marty Robbins. In 1961, American country artist, Skeeter Davis, recorded and released the song as a single for RCA Victor.

"The Hands You're Holding Now" was recorded in March 1961 at the RCA Victor A Studio in New York, New York, United States. The song was released as a single in March 1961 and peaked at number eleven on the Billboard Hot C&W Sides chart. The song was not originally issued onto an album.

== Charts ==
| Chart (1961) | Peak position |
|---|---|
| U.S. Billboard Hot C&W Sides | 11 |
