= I Forgot More Than You'll Ever Know =

Song by Cecil Null

Single by The Davis Sisters

from the album Memories
- B-side: "Rockabye Boogie"
- Released: 1953
- Recorded: 1953
- Genre: Country
- Length: 2:16
- Label: RCA
- Songwriter: Cecil Null
- Producer: Stephen Sholes

"I Forgot More Than You'll Ever Know" (sometimes "I've Forgotten More Than You'll Ever Know About Him") is a song, written by Cecil Null.

== Song background ==
The song was one of five tracks recorded (including two versions of the "B" side, "Rockabye Boogie") on May 23, 1953. The musicians for the sessions were Chet Atkins, lead guitar; Velma E. Williams Smith, guitar; Jerry Byrd, steel guitar; Ernie Newton, bass; and Hal Smith, fiddle. The session, The Davis Sisters' first in Nashville, Tennessee was recorded at Thomas Productions.

The song tells the story of the ex-girlfriend of a young man warning his smug, ruthless current flame who stole him away that she'll lose him too one day "when his love goes cold." The song is sung completely in duet harmony by Skeeter and Betty Jack with the exception of the lines "You stole his love from me one day, you didn't care how you hurt me, but you can never steal away memories of what used to be" which is sung by Betty Jack.

== Chart performance ==
The song was a number one country music single for The Davis Sisters in 1953. It was the first hit for the duo of Skeeter Davis and Betty Jack Davis, and also their only one, as Betty Jack was killed in an automobile accident the week the record was released.

"I Forgot More Than You'll Ever Know" was a blockbuster hit, the only number one country song by a female duet until the rise of The Judds some thirty years later. The song stayed at number one on the country charts for eight weeks. It ranks among the top 100 country hits of all time according to chart historian Joel Whitburn.

== Cover versions ==
Many artists have recorded versions of the song including:

- Skeeter Davis rerecorded the song as an album track for her first solo album, 1959's I'll Sing You a Song and Harmonize Too and continued to sing the song throughout her career. The song was second only to her blockbuster crossover hit "The End of the World" as her most popular number in concerts. Elvis Presley told Davis that it was one of his favorite country records and Roy Acuff frequently requested she sing the song at the Grand Ole Opry.
- Bob Dylan (on Self Portrait)

"I Forgot More Than You'll Ever Know"

Song by Bob Dylan

from the album Self Portrait
- Released: June 8, 1970
- Genre: Rock, folk rock
- Label: Columbia
- Songwriter: C.A. Null
- Producer: Bob Johnston

- In 1960, Sonny James scored a modest pop hit with his version, which peaked at #80 on the Hot 100.
- Jeanne Pruett had a mid-level charting country single with it in 1972.
- Johnny Cash
- Jerry Lee Lewis
- Patti Page
- Kitty Wells
- Jimmie Rodgers
- Roy Drusky, Del Reeves
- The Statler Brothers
- Slim Whitman
- Jann Browne with Wanda Jackson
- Patty Loveless
- Dolly Parton, Loretta Lynn, and Tammy Wynette on the album Honky Tonk Angels.
- Dylan and Tom Petty performed the song as a duet in their 1986 True Confessions Tour
- Elvis Costello recorded the song as a duet with Tom Waits on the album Such Unlikely Covers.
- Swedish rock artist-songwriter Svante Karlsson covered it on his debut album American Songs in 1999.
- In 2006, The Perrys recorded as a Southern-gospel number, "He Forgot More Than I'll Ever Know".
- Esther Phillips covered also it on her album The country side of Esther Phillips in 1966, I've Forgotten More Than You'll Ever Know About Him.
