= Here's the Answer =

Studio album by Skeeter Davis
- Released: January 1961
- Recorded: May 13, 1960 – December 1960
- Genre: Country, Nashville Sound
- Label: RCA Victor
- Producer: Chet Atkins

Skeeter Davis chronology
I'll Sing You a Song and Harmonize Too (1959)	Here's the Answer (1961)	Porter Wagoner and Skeeter Davis Sing Duets (1962)

Singles from Here's the Answer
- 1. "(I Can't Help You) I'm Falling Too" Released: July 1960; 2. "My Last Date (With You)" Released: December 1960

Here's the Answer is the second studio album by American country artist Skeeter Davis. The album was released in January 1961 on RCA Victor Records and was produced by Chet Atkins. The album consisted of cover versions of hit singles by country artists and answer songs to the hits.

== Background and content ==
Here's the Answer was recorded at the RCA Victor Studio in Nashville, Tennessee, United States in three sessions. The first session took place May 13, 1960, followed by a session October 11, and then ending in December of that year. Like Davis' previous release, she harmonized with herself on the recordings in order to give her voice and the production a fuller sound. The album consisted of cover versions of major hit singles by country artists on the RCA Victor label, followed by Davis' answer song to the hit. It included the original versions of hits by artists such as Jim Reeves' "He'll Have to Go", Floyd Cramer's "Last Date", and Hank Locklin's "Please Help Me, I'm Falling". In response, Davis sings the answer songs; "He'll Have to Stay", "My Last Date (With You)", and "(I Can't Help You) I'm Falling Too". Richie Unterberger of Allmusic called the concept behind the album to be "hokey". Unterberger explained that half of the album wasn't "Davis at all", but instead the original versions of the song by the original artists are included. Unterberger gave the release only two out of five stars, stating, "It gets really ridiculous when Davis sings an answer song ("My Last Date") to Floyd Cramer's instrumental hit "Last Date." Davis' songs are okay mainstream country/pop; a couple of them ("(I Can't Help You) I'm Falling Too" and "My Last Date") were even Top 40 pop hits. But alternating her tracks bang-bang with hits by various other male country stars makes for a rather herky-jerky listening experience."

Here's the Answer was released as an LP record, and contained six songs on each side of the record. The album was reissued on a compact disc in the mid 1990s and added the four additional bonus tracks Davis recorded as duets with Bobby Bare and Porter Wagoner in the 1960s; "A Little Bitty Tear" with Porter Wagoner, "Have I Told You Lately That I Love You" with Porter Wagoner, "A Dear John Letter" with Bobby Bare, and "We'll Sing in the Sunshine" with Bobby Bare.

== Release ==
Here's the Answer spawned two singles in 1960. The first single released was Davis' response to Hank Locklin's "Please Help Me, I'm Falling" called, "(I Can't Help You) I'm Falling Too". The single was released in July 1960 and peaked for three weeks at #2 on the Billboard Magazine Hot Country Songs chart and became her first single to cross over to the Billboard Hot 100, reaching #39. The second single was released in December 1960 called, "My Last Date (With You)". The song reached #5 on the Billboard Magazine Hot Country Songs, while also reaching the Top 40 on the Billboard Hot 100 in 1961. The songs became her second and third Top 10 hits as a solo artist. Here's the Answer was officially released in January 1961, but did not chart any Billboard list.

== Track listing ==
Side one
No.	Title	Writer(s)	Artist performing	Length
1.	"He'll Have to Go"	Joe Allison, Audrey Allison	Jim Reeves	2:22
2.	"He'll Have to Stay"	Allison, Allison, Charles Grean	Skeeter Davis	2:25
3.	"Last Date"	Floyd Cramer	Floyd Cramer	2:28
4.	"My Last Date (With You)"	Boudleaux Bryant, Cramer, Skeeter Davis	Skeeter Davis	2:33
5.	"Tell Laura I Love Her"	Jeff Barry, Ben Raleigh	Ray Peterson	2:58
6.	"Tell Tommy I Miss Him"	Barry, Raleigh	Skeeter Davis	2:26

Side two
No.	Title	Writer(s)	Artist performing	Length
1.	"Please Help Me, I'm Falling"	Hal Blair, Don Robertson	Hank Locklin	2:23
2.	"(I Can't Help You) I'm Falling Too"	Blair, Robertson, Davis	Skeeter Davis	2:25
3.	"I Really Don't Want to Know"	Howard Barnes, Robertson	Eddy Arnold	2:47
4.	"I Really Want You to Know"	Barnes, Robertson, Davis	Skeeter Davis	2:28
5.	"Just One Time"	Don Gibson	Don Gibson	2:45
6.	"I Want to See You Too (Just One Time)"	Gibson, Davis	Skeeter Davis	2:22

Bonus tracks on reissued version
No.	Title	Writer(s)	Artist performing	Length
13.	"A Little Bitty Tear"	Hank Cochran	Skeeter Davis and Porter Wagoner	2:07
14.	"Have I Told You Lately That I Love You"	Scotty Wiseman	Skeeter Davis and Porter Wagoner	2:33
15.	"A Dear John Letter"	Billy Barton, Fuzzy Owen, Louis Talley	Bobby Bare and Skeeter Davis	1:55
16.	"We'll Sing in the Sunshine"	Gale Garnett	Bobby Bare and Skeeter Davis	2:21

== Personnel ==
- Chet Atkins – guitar
- Jerry Byrd – bass
- Floyd Cramer – piano
- Skeeter Davis – harmony vocals, background vocals, lead vocals
- Jimmy Day – steel guitar
- Hank Garland – guitar
- Buddy Harman – drums
- Bud Issac – steel guitar
- Anita Kerr Singers – background vocals
- Grady Martin – guitar
- Bob Moore – bass
- Velma Smith – rhythm guitar

== Sales chart positions ==
Singles

Year	Song	Peak chart positions	
Year	Song	US Country	US
1960	"(I Can't Help You) I'm Falling Too"	2	39
1960	"My Last Date (With You)"	5	26
