= What Does It Take (To Keep a Man Like You Satisfied) =

- Japanese release picture sleeve

Single by Skeeter Davis

from the album What Does It Take (To Keep a Man Like You Satisfied)
- B-side: "What I Go Thru' (To Keep Holding on to You)"
- Released: June 1967
- Recorded: May 1, 1967; Nashville, Tennessee, U.S.
- Genre: Country, Nashville Sound
- Label: RCA Victor
- Songwriter: Jim Glaser
- Producer: Felton Jarvis

Skeeter Davis singles chronology
"Fuel to the Flame" (1967)	"What Does It Take (To Keep a Man Like You Satisfied)" (1967)	"Set Him Free" (1967)

"What Does It Take (To Keep a Man Like You Satisfied)" is a song written by Jim Glaser, that was recorded and released as a single in 1967 by American country artist, Skeeter Davis. Jim Glaser was a member of the popular country music group, Tompall and the Glaser Brothers.

"What Does It Take (To Keep a Man Like You Satisfied)" was recorded at the RCA Victor Studio in Nashville, Tennessee, United States on May 1, 1967, one month before it was released. The session was produced by Felton Jarvis.

The song was released as a single officially in June 1967. "What Does It Take (To Keep a Man Like You Satisfied)" reached a peak of number five on the Billboard Magazine Hot Country Singles chart later that year. The single became Davis' first top-ten country hit in three years since 1964's "Gonna Get Along Without You Now" reached number eight. Additionally, "What Does It Take" was Davis' first entry onto the Billboard Bubbling Under Hot 100 since 1965, reaching a peak of twenty-one. The song was eventually released onto a studio album of the same name.

== Chart performance ==
Chart (1967)	Peak position
U.S. Billboard Hot Country Singles	5
U.S. Billboard Bubbling Under Hot 100 Singles	21
