= Skeeter Davis Sings The End of the World =

The End of the World

Studio album by Skeeter Davis
- Released: March 1963
- Recorded: 1962
- Studio: RCA Studio B, Nashville
- Genre: Pop; folk; country
- Length: 29:21
- Label: RCA Victor
- Producer: Anita Kerr; Chet Atkins

Skeeter Davis chronology
Porter Wagoner and Skeeter Davis Sing Duets (1962)	The End of the World (1963)	Let Me Get Close to You (1964)

Singles from Skeeter Davis
- 1. "The End of the World" Released: October 1962

Professional ratings
Review scores
Source	Rating
AllMusic	4/5 stars

The End of the World is the fourth studio album by American country singer Skeeter Davis. It was released in March 1963 by RCA Victor. It includes the hit single "The End of the World", which peaked at number two on the Billboard Hot 100 pop chart.

== Track listing ==
Side 1
No.	Title	Writer(s)	Length
1.	"The End of the World"	Arthur Kent, Sylvia Dee	2:33
2.	"Silver Threads and Golden Needles"	Dick Reynolds, Jack Rhodes	2:10
3.	"Mine is a Lonely Life"	Justin Tubb	2:13
4.	"Once Upon a Time"	Harlan Howard	2:15
5.	"Why I'm Walkin'"	Howard, Stonewall Jackson	2:45
6.	"Don't Let Me Cross Over"	Penny Jay	2:40

Side 2
No.	Title	Writer(s)	Length
7.	"My Coloring Book"	John Kander, Fred Ebb	2:13
8.	"(I Want to Go) Where Nobody Knows Me"	Dick Flood	3:27
9.	"Keep Your Hands Off My Baby"	Gerry Goffin, Carole King	2:03
10.	"Something Precious"	Lorene Mann	2:09
11.	"Longing to Hold You Again"	Don Robertson	2:15
12.	"He Called Me Baby"	Howard	2:38

== Credits and personnel ==
- Skeeter Davis – vocals
- Anita Kerr – producer
- Chet Atkins – producer

Credits adapted from the album liner notes.
