= Carl Belew =

American country music singer-songwriter (1931–1990)

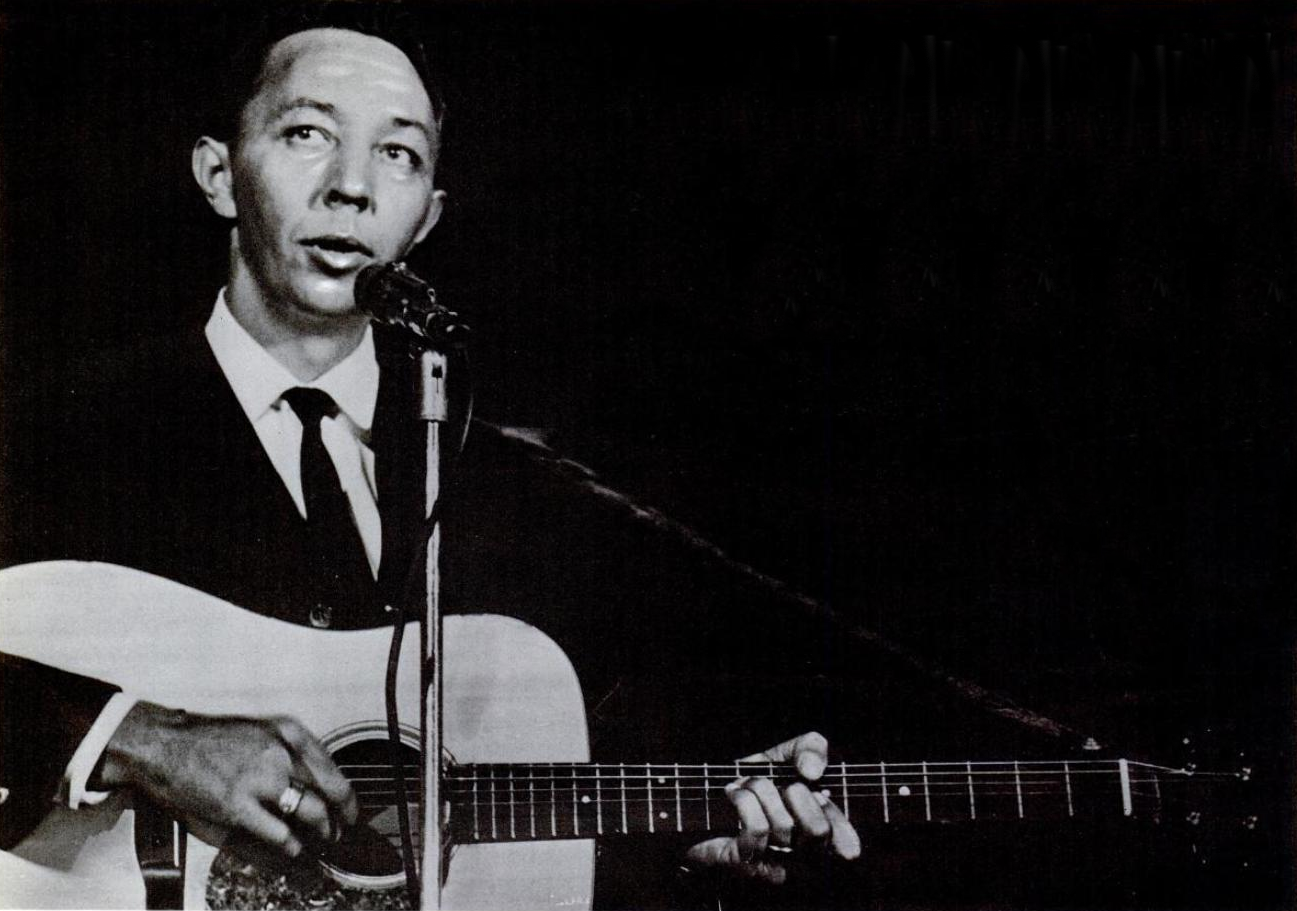
- Carl Belew in 1965

Background information
- Born: Carl Robert Belew; April 21, 1931; Salina, Oklahoma, U.S.
- Origin: Nashville, Tennessee
- Died: October 31, 1990 (aged 59) Salina, Oklahoma, U.S.
- Genres: Country
- Occupation: Singer-songwriter
- Instruments: Vocals, guitar
- Years active: 1950s–1970s
- Labels: Decca, RCA Victor, MCA
- Formerly of: Johnnie & Jack, Jim Reeves

Carl Robert Belew (April 21, 1931 – October 31, 1990) was an American country music singer and songwriter. Belew was recorded for Decca, RCA Victor, and MCA in the 1950s through 1970s, charting 11 times on Hot Country Songs. He also wrote singles for Johnnie & Jack, Eddy Arnold, Jim Reeves, and others.

== Career ==
Born in Salina, Oklahoma, Belew began his musical career in the 1950s when he performed on the Louisiana Hayride. He signed to Decca Records by the end of the decade, reaching number 9 on the country music charts with "Am I That Easy to Forget", which was later recorded by Skeeter Davis, Debbie Reynolds, Esther Phillips, Engelbert Humperdinck, Jim Reeves, and others. Also in this period, Johnnie & Jack recorded Belew's "Stop the World and Let Me Off", while Andy Williams recorded "Lonely Street".

Belew's only other chart entry for Decca was the Number 19 "Too Much to Lose", followed by the Number 8 "Hello Out There", his first RCA Victor release, in 1962. He continued to write songs for others, including "What's He Doing in My World" by Eddy Arnold and "That's When I See the Blues" by Jim Reeves; both Waylon Jennings and Susan Raye charted in the 1970s with covers of "Stop the World and Let Me Off".

Belew died of cancer on October 31, 1990, in Salina, Oklahoma.

== Discography ==
=== Albums ===
- Carl Belew (1960)
- Hello Out There (1964)
- Am I That Easy to Forget (1965)
- Another Lonely Night (1965)
- Country Songs (1966)
- Lonely Street (1967)
- Twelve Shades of Belew (1968)
- When My Baby Sings His Song (1972)

=== Singles ===
| Year | Single | Peak positions | Album |
| Year | Single | US Country | Album |
|---|---|---|---|
| 1957 | "Stop the World (And Let Me Off)" | — | —N/a |
| 1959 | "Am I That Easy to Forget" | 9 | Carl Belew |
| 1960 | "Too Much to Lose" | 19 | Carl Belew |
| 1962 | "Hello Out There"^{A} | 8 | Hello Out There |
| 1964 | "In the Middle of a Memory" | 23 | Am I That Easy To Forget |
| 1965 | "Crystal Chandelier" | 12 | Twelve Shades of Belew |
| 1966 | "Boston Jail" | 43 | Twelve Shades of Belew |
| 1966 | "Walking Shadow, Talking Memory" | 65 | Twelve Shades of Belew |
| 1967 | "Girl Crazy" | 65 | —N/a |
| 1968 | "Mary's Little Lamb" | 68 | —N/a |
| 1971 | "All I Need Is You" (with Betty Jean Robinson) | 51 | When My Baby sings His Songs |
| 1974 | "Welcome Back to My World" | 56 | Big Time Gamblin' Man |

- ^{A}Peaked at 20 on Bubbling Under Hot 100 Singles.
