= Lost to a Geisha Girl =

Single by Skeeter Davis
- B-side: "I'm Going Steady with a Heartache"
- Released: December 1957
- Recorded: September 1957; Nashville, Tennessee, U.S.
- Genre: Country, Nashville Sound
- Label: RCA Victor
- Songwriter: Lawton Williams
- Producer: Chet Atkins

Skeeter Davis singles chronology
"He Left His Heart for Me" (1957)	"Lost to a Geisha Girl" (1957)	"Walk Softly Darling" (1958)

"Lost to a Geisha Girl" is a song written by Lawton Williams. It was recorded and released as a single by American country artist, Skeeter Davis, in 1957.

"Lost to a Geisha Girl" was an answer song to Hank Locklin's 1957 top-ten single, "Geisha Girl". It was the first in a series of answer songs Davis would record. The song was recorded at the RCA Victor Studio in Nashville, Tennessee, United States in September 1957. Included in the session was the eventual b-side to "Lost to a Geisha Girl" entitled, "I'm Going Steady for a Heartache". The song was released as a single in December 1957. It was Davis' second single issued as a solo artist following her departure from The Davis Sisters in 1956. The single peaked at number fifteen on the Billboard Magazine Most Played C&W in Juke Boxes chart in early 1958, becoming her first major hit as a solo artist.

== Chart performance ==
Chart (1957–1958)	Peak position
U.S. Billboard Most Played C&W in Juke Boxes	15
