= Tracey Dey =

American singer (born 1943)

- Born: Nora Ferrari; April 21, 1943 (age 83); Yonkers, New York, United States
- Genres: Pop, rock
- Occupation: Singer

Tracey Dey (born Nora Ferrari, April 21, 1943) is an American former pop singer in the girl group genre of the early and mid-1960s.

== Career ==
Born in Yonkers, New York, United States, she was attending college at Fordham University when producer Bob Crewe became aware of a demo tape she had recorded. Crewe signed her to his production company, Genius Inc., and had her record "Jerry (I'm Your Sherry)", an "answer" to The Four Seasons' "Sherry", which Crewe had also produced. Released by The 4 Seasons' label, Vee Jay, the record reportedly received airplay on New York radio (and made the top ten at KYNO in Fresno, California), but did not become a national hit. The follow-up, also on Vee Jay, was "Long Time, No See" but it failed to chart. Her breakthrough came at Liberty Records with "Teenage Cleopatra", a Beverly Ross (of Ronald and Ruby and cowriter of their hit, "Lollipop"; best known as by The Chordettes) composition. The song was a timely cash-in on the press and fan interest surrounding the Elizabeth Taylor film, "Cleopatra" and became a national hit. The follow-up, "Here Comes The Boy" (co-written by Eddie Rambeau, Bud Rehak and Bob Crewe, the writers of Diane Renay's "Navy Blue" smash) also made the national charts.

Dey released nine solo singles between 1962 and 1966, of which three - "Teenage Cleopatra", "Here Comes The Boy", and her version of Teresa Brewer's 1952 hit "Gonna Get Along Without You Now" - reached the Hot 100. Although none became major hits, they have since been hailed as some of the best of the girl group era. Many of her tunes were written by Crewe and Bob Gaudio, who was the keyboardist and main songwriter for The Four Seasons. Her records were released on Vee Jay, Liberty, Amy, and Columbia. Dey also released two singles with Gary Knight, a Crewe songwriting associate, as Dey and Knight. For several years in the mid-1960s, she was a regular television attraction on The Clay Cole Show.

The majority of the material has been re-released on compact disc via a shared collection with Marcie Blaine but it is now out of print. Several tracks are available on various compilations: "I Won't Tell" can be found on the Rhino Records box set One Kiss Can Lead To Another: Girl Group Sounds, Lost & Found; "Long Time, No See" is included in the Castle Pulse box set, "Chapel of Love and Other Girl Group Gems"; "Teenage Cleopatra" is included on the Ace compilation, "Early Girls, Volume 4"; "Marching Home" can be found on the Ace compilation, Where The Girls Are, Volume 5; "Jerry (I'm Your Sherry)" is on Ace compilation, The Answer To Everything: Girl Answer Songs of the 60s.

Leaving behind the music business and the Tracey Dey moniker in the late 1960s, Ferrari completed a master's degree in Theater Arts at Columbia University and, for a while, taught college courses. She later began acting and writing screenplays and had a small part in the 2007 film, Reservation Road.

She is no relation to Susan Dey of Partridge Family and L.A. Law fame.

== Singles ==
as Tracey Dey

- "Jerry (I'm Your Sherry) / "Once in a Blue Moon" (1962) Vee Jay #467 (#29 CAN)
- "Long Time, No See / "Jealous Eyes" (1963) Vee Jay #506
- "Teenage Cleopatra" / "Who's That (A Dream Smiled at Me)"(1963)Liberty #55604 - US Billboard Hot 100 #75; CAN #14
- "Here Comes the Boy" / "Teddy's the Boy I Love" (1963) Amy #894 - US Billboard Hot 100 #93
- "Gonna Get Along Without You Now" / "Go Away" (1964) Amy #901 US Billboard Hot 100 #51; CAN #25
- "Hangin' On to My Baby" / "Ska-Doo-Dee-Yah" (1964) Amy #908 - US Billboard Bubbling Under #107
- "I Won't Tell" / "Any Kind of Love" (1964) Amy #912 (released 9/64)
- "Blue Turns to Grey" / "Didn't Ya" (1964) Amy #917
- "Hanky Panky" / "Shakin' the Blues Away" (1965) Amy #928
- "Marchin' Home" / "Teddy's the Boy I Love" (1966) Columbia #43889

as Dey and Knight (with Gary Knight)

- "Young Love" / "I'm Gonna Love You Tomorrow" (1965) Columbia #43466
- "Sayin' Something'" / "Ooh Da La Da Lay" (1966) Columbia #43693
