= Sun Glasses (song) =

1965 single by Skeeter Davis

Single by Skeeter Davis

from the album Singin' In The Summer Sun
- B-side: "He Loved Me Too Little"
- Released: 1965
- Genre: Country
- Length: 2:38
- Label: RCA Victor
- Songwriter: John D. Loudermilk
- Producer: Chet Atkins

Skeeter Davis singles chronology
"I Can't Help It" (1965)	"Sun Glasses" (1965)	"I Can't See Me Without You" (1965)

"Sunglasses"

Single by Tracey Ullman

from the album You Caught Me Out
- B-side: "Candy"
- Released: 1984
- Genre: Pop
- Label: Stiff
- Songwriter: John D. Loudermilk
- Producer: Peter Collins

Tracey Ullman singles chronology
"My Guy's Mad at Me" (1984)	"Sunglasses" (1984)	"Helpless" (1984)

Official video
- "Sunglasses" on YouTube

"Sun Glasses" is a song originally released by Skeeter Davis in 1965, which was written by John D. Loudermilk. In 1984 Tracey Ullman released a version of the song titled "Sunglasses", which became an international hit.

== Skeeter Davis version ==
Skeeter Davis's version reached No. 16 on Record World's Top Country Singles chart, No. 19 on Cash Box's Country Top 50, and No. 30 on Billboard's Hot Country Singles chart.

In 1966, Davis was nominated for a Grammy Award for Best Country & Western Vocal Performance - Female for her rendition of "Sun Glasses".

=== Chart performance ===
Chart (1965)	Peak position
US Billboard Hot Country Singles	30
US Cash Box Country Top 50	19
US Record World Top Country Singles	16
US Billboard Bubbling Under the Hot 100	120
US Cash Box Looking Ahead	23
US Record World Singles Coming Up	23

== Tracey Ullman version ==
In 1984 Tracey Ullman released a version of the song titled "Sunglasses". Ullman's version spent 9 weeks on the UK Singles Chart, peaking at No. 18, while reaching No. 6 on Austria's Ö3 Hit wähl mit chart, No. 13 on Sweden's Topplistan, and No. 18 on the Irish Singles Chart.

=== Reception ===
Muriel Gray at Smash Hits said, "This is a completely undisguised Phil Spector/Ronettes/Shangri-Las ripoff, straight from any 'Best of the Sixties' album you care to pick up. So why is Tracey Ullman living in the past so fanatically? Presumably to make a great deal of money."

=== Chart performance ===
Chart (1984)	Peak position
Austria (Ö3 Hit wähl mit)	6
Flanders	25
Germany	52
Ireland (IRMA)	18
Netherlands (Nationale Hitparade)	29
Netherlands (Dutch Top 40)	32
Sweden (Topplistan)	13
UK Singles Chart	18
