= Where I Ought to Be =

Single by Skeeter Davis
- B-side: "Something Precious"
- Released: January 1962
- Recorded: November 1, 1961
- Studio: RCA Victor Studio B Nashville, Tennessee, U.S.
- Genre: Country, Nashville Sound
- Label: RCA Victor
- Songwriter: Harlan Howard
- Producer: Chet Atkins

Skeeter Davis singles chronology
"Optimistic" (1961)	"Where I Ought to Be" (1962)	"The Little Music Box" (1962)

"Where I Ought to Be" is a song written by Harlan Howard. In 1961, Skeeter Davis recorded and released the song as a single for RCA Victor in 1962.

"Where I Ought to Be" was recorded on November 1, 1961, at the RCA Victor Studio in Nashville, Tennessee, United States. The song was released as a single in January 1962, and it peaked at number nine on the Billboard Magazine Hot C&W Sides chart later that year. The single became Davis' fifth top-ten hit on the country chart at that point. The song was not originally issued onto an official album.

== Chart performance ==
Chart (1962)	Peak position
U.S. Billboard Hot C&W Sides	9
