= Why So Lonely? =

Studio album by Skeeter Davis
- Released: March 25, 1968
- Recorded: Early 1968
- Studio: RCA Victor (Nashville, Tennessee)
- Genre: Country; folk
- Length: 30:07
- Label: RCA
- Producer: Felton Jarvis

Skeeter Davis chronology
What Does It Take (To Keep a Man Like You Satisfied) (1967)	Why So Lonely? (1968)	I Love Flatt and Scruggs (1968)

Why So Lonely? is the fourteenth studio album by American country musician Skeeter Davis. It was released on March 25, 1968, through RCA Records.

Professional ratings
Review scores
Source	Rating
AllMusic	3/5 stars

== Track listing ==
Side one
No.	Title	Writer(s)	Length
1.	"Why So Lonely?"	Paul Tannen	2:26
2.	"Burning a Hole in My Mind"	Cy Coben	2:38
3.	"Don't Keep Me Lonely Too Long"	Melba Montgomery	2:32
4.	"Promises, Promises"	Carlyle Hughey; Lynn Anderson	1:50
5.	"The Most Wanted Man"	Jan Zackery; Rupert Stephens	2:46
6.	"Somewhere with Me Sometime"	Paul Craft	2:35

Side two
No.	Title	Writer(s)	Length
1.	"I Don't Wanna Play House"	Billy Sherrill; Glenn Sutton	2:54
2.	"You've Still Gotta Place in My Heart"	Leon Payne	2:25
3.	"Little Things Got Big"	Skeeter Davis	2:36
4.	"I Wouldn't Treat My Dog (Like You Treat Me)"	Coben	2:06
5.	"Lonely Again"	Jean Chapel	2:55
6.	"You Mean the World to Me"	Sherrill; Sutton	2:18
Total length:			30:07

== Personnel ==
- Skeeter Davis – vocals

Production

- Felton Jarvis – producer
- Bill Walker – arranger
