= There's a Fool Born Every Minute =

Single by Skeeter Davis

from the album Skeeter Skeeter Skeeter
- B-side: "I Can't See Past My Tears"
- Released: March 1968
- Recorded: January 11, 1968; Nashville, Tennessee, U.S.
- Genre: Country, Nashville Sound
- Label: RCA Victor
- Songwriters: Paul Evans, Paul Parnes
- Producer: Felton Jarvis

Skeeter Davis singles chronology
| "Instinct for Survival" (1968) | "There's a Fool Born Every Minute" (1968) | "Timothy" (1968) |

"There's a Fool Born Every Minute" is a song written by Paul Evans and Paul Parnes. It was recorded and released as a single in 1968 by American country artist, Skeeter Davis.

"There's a Fool Born Every Minute" was recorded at the RCA Victor Studio in Nashville, Tennessee, United States on January 11, 1968. The session was produced by Felton Jarvis. The song was released as a single in March 1968, reaching the top-twenty of the Billboard Magazine Hot Country Singles chart. Additionally, it became Davis' first single to chart on the Canadian RPM Country Songs chart, reaching number eighteen. In 1971, the song was issued onto her studio album Skeeter Skeeter Skeeter.

== Chart performance ==
| Chart (1968) | Peak position |
|---|---|
| U.S. Billboard Hot Country Singles | 16 |
| CAN RPM Country Songs | 18 |
