= Fuel to the Flame =

Single by Skeeter Davis

from the album What Does It Take (To Keep a Man Like You Satisfied)
- B-side: "You Call This Love"
- Released: January 1967
- Recorded: June 15, 1966; Nashville, Tennessee, U.S.
- Genre: Country, Nashville Sound
- Label: RCA Victor
- Songwriters: Bill Owens, Dolly Parton
- Producer: Felton Jarvis

Skeeter Davis singles chronology
"Goin' Down the Road (Feelin' Bad)" (1966)	"Fuel to the Flame" (1967)	"What Does It Take (To Keep a Man Like You Satisfied)" (1967)

"Fuel to the Flame" is a song written by Dolly Parton and her uncle, Bill Owens. It was recorded and released as a single in 1967 by American country artist, Skeeter Davis.

The song helped to establish Dolly Parton as a major star in American country music. Along with the success of another song she co-wrote, "Put It Off Until Tomorrow", Parton was able to sign a recording contract with Monument Records as a music artist.

"Fuel to the Flame" was recorded at the RCA Victor Studio in Nashville, Tennessee, United States on June 15, 1966, nearly a year before its release. The session was produced by Felton Jarvis. This was one of the first sessions Jarvis would produce by Skeeter Davis. The song was released as a single the following year in January 1967. "Fuel to the Flame" became Davis' first major hit in two years, reaching a peak of number eleven on the Billboard Magazine Hot Country Singles chart. The song was later issued onto Davis' studio album, What Does It Take (To Keep a Man Like You Satisfied). Parton recorded a version of the song herself and included it on her debut album Hello, I'm Dolly.

== Chart performance ==
Chart (1967)	Peak position
U.S. Billboard Hot Country Singles	11
