= He Says the Same Things to Me =

- German release picture sleeve

Single by Skeeter Davis

from the album Let Me Get Close to You
- B-side: "How Much Can a Lonely Heart Stand"
- Released: January 1964
- Recorded: November 15, 1963
- Studio: RCA Victor Studio B Nashville, Tennessee, U.S.
- Genre: Country, girl group
- Label: RCA Victor
- Songwriters: Gary Geld, Peter Udell
- Producer: Chet Atkins

Skeeter Davis singles chronology
| "I Can't Stay Mad at You" (1963) | "He Says the Same Things to Me" (1964) | "Gonna Get Along Without You Now" (1963) |

"He Says the Same Things to Me" is a song written by Gary Geld and Peter Udell. It was recorded by American country artist, Skeeter Davis in 1963.

"He Says the Same Things to Me" was recorded at the RCA Victor Studio in Nashville, Tennessee, United States on November 15, 1963, precisely one week before the assassination of U.S. President John F. Kennedy. The song peaked at number seventeen on the Country Singles chart and later in the year, the single was issued onto Davis' studio album, Let Me Get Close to You.

The session was produced by Chet Atkins. The song was released as a single the following year (January 1964), serving as the follow-up to Davis' major country pop crossover hit, "I Can't Stay Mad at You". The single also reached the Billboard Hot 100, however it peaked outside the top-forty at number forty-seven. In addition, the single reached number fifteen on the Hot Adult Contemporary Tracks chart, becoming Davis' second entry on that chart.

== Chart performance ==
| Chart (1964) | Peak position |
|---|---|
| U.S. Billboard Hot C&W Sides | 17 |
| U.S. Billboard Hot 100 Singles | 47 |
| U.S. Billboard Easy Listening Singles | 15 |

== Appearances in media ==
- In the film The Devil All the Time, this song plays on Tecumseh's jukebox as Deputy Lee Bodecker attempts to investigate the bar's back room.
