= I'm Saving My Love =

- Japanese release picture sleeve

Single by Skeeter Davis

from the album Cloudy, with Occasional Tears
- B-side: "Somebody Else on Your Mind"
- Released: April 1963
- Recorded: January 9, 1963
- Studio: RCA Victor Studio B Nashville, Tennessee, U.S.
- Genre: Country, Nashville Sound
- Label: RCA Victor
- Songwriter: Alex Zanetis
- Producer: Anita Kerr

Skeeter Davis singles chronology
"The End of the World" (1962)	"I'm Saving My Love" (1963)	"I Can't Stay Mad at You" (1963)

"I'm Saving My Love" is a song written by Alex Zanetis and recorded by American country artist, Skeeter Davis in 1963. Later in the year, the single was issued onto Davis' fifth studio album, Cloudy, with Occasional Tears.

"I'm Saving My Love" was recorded at the RCA Victor Studio in Nashville, Tennessee, United States on January 9, 1963. The session was produced by Anita Kerr. The song was released as a single in April 1963, serving as the follow-up to Davis' major country pop crossover hit, "The End of the World". "I'm Saving My Love" also became a top-ten hit, reaching number nine on the Billboard Magazine Hot Country Singles chart, while also just missing the top-forty on the Billboard Hot 100. In addition, the single reached number thirteen on the Hot Adult Contemporary Tracks chart, becoming Davis' second entry on that chart.

== Chart performance ==
Chart (1963)	Peak position
U.S. Billboard Hot 100	41
U.S. Billboard Hot C&W Sides	9
U.S. Billboard Easy Listening	13
