= (I Can't Help You) I'm Falling Too =

- Italian release picture sleeve

Single by Skeeter Davis

from the album Here's the Answer
- B-side: "No Never"
- Released: July 1960
- Recorded: May 13, 1960
- Studio: RCA Victor Studio B, Nashville, Tennessee, U.S.
- Genre: Country, Nashville Sound
- Label: RCA Victor
- Songwriters: Hal Blair, Skeeter Davis, Don Robertson
- Producer: Chet Atkins

Skeeter Davis singles chronology
"Am I That Easy to Forget" (1960)	"(I Can't Help You) I'm Falling Too" (1960)	"My Last Date (With You)" (1960)

"(I Can't Help You) I'm Falling Too" is a song written by Hal Blair, Skeeter Davis, and Don Robertson. In 1960, Skeeter Davis recorded and released the song as a single for RCA Victor. It was an answer song to Hank Locklin's major country pop crossover hit entitled, "Please Help Me, I'm Falling". It was Davis' second answer song in response to a Locklin tune.

"(I Can't Help You) I'm Falling Too" was recorded on May 13, 1960, at the RCA Victor Studio in Nashville, Tennessee, United States. The song was released as a single in July 1960, and it peaked at number two on the Billboard Magazine Hot C&W Sides chart later and number thirty nine on the Billboard Hot 100. The single became Davis' highest-charting single to that point and her fourth solo hit. It also became her first single to chart on the Hot 100. In the later months, the song was issued onto Davis' second studio album entitled, Here's the Answer.

== Chart performance ==
Chart (1960)	Peak position
U.S. Billboard Hot C&W Sides	2
U.S. Billboard Hot 100	39
