= I'm a Lover (Not a Fighter) =

Single by Skeeter Davis

from the album A Place in the Country
- B-side: "I Didn't Cry Today"
- Released: November 1969
- Recorded: October 1, 1969; Nashville, Tennessee, U.S.
- Genre: Country, Nashville Sound
- Label: RCA Victor
- Songwriter: Ronny Light
- Producer: Ronny Light

Skeeter Davis singles chronology
"Teach Me to Love You" (1969)	"I'm a Lover (Not a Fighter)" (1969)	"Your Husband, My Wife" (1970)

"I'm a Lover (Not a Fighter)" is a song written by Ronny Light and recorded and released as a single in 1969 by American country artist, Skeeter Davis.

The song was recorded at the RCA Victor Studio in Nashville, Tennessee, United States on October 1, 1969. The session was produced by Ronny Light as well. The song was released as a single in November 1969, reaching the top-ten on the Billboard Magazine Hot Country Singles chart in 1970. Additionally, it became Davis' second single to chart on the Canadian RPM Country Songs chart. “I'm a Lover (Not a Fighter)” reached #7. The song was her first top 10 country hit in Canada. In 1970, the song was issued onto her studio album A Place in the Country.

== Chart performance ==
Chart (1969–1970)	Peak position
U.S. Billboard Hot Country Singles	9
CAN RPM Country Songs	7
