= I Can't Stay Mad at You =

Single by Skeeter Davis

from the album Let Me Get Close to You
- B-side: "It Was Only a Heart"
- Released: August 1963
- Recorded: April 1963
- Studio: RCA Victor Studio B Nashville, Tennessee, US
- Genre: Country, girl group
- Length: 2:08
- Label: RCA Victor
- Songwriter(s): Gerry Goffin, Carole King
- Producer(s): Chet Atkins

Skeeter Davis singles chronology
"I'm Saving My Love" (1963)	"I Can't Stay Mad at You" (1963)	"He Says the Same Things to Me" (1964)

"I Can't Stay Mad at You" is a song written by Gerry Goffin and Carole King. It was originally recorded by American country artist Skeeter Davis, becoming her second top-ten hit on the Billboard Hot 100 in 1963. "I Can't Stay Mad at You" followed on the popular success of Davis' earlier 1963 crossover hit "The End of the World". The song was one of the first Goffin-King compositions to be recorded by a country music performer.

== Background and reception ==
"I Can't Stay Mad at You" was written by songwriting duo Gerry Goffin and Carole King. They had previously enjoyed pop successes as songwriters, including "Will You Love Me Tomorrow" and "Take Good Care of My Baby". King would eventually embark on a successful recording career in the early 1970s. The song was recorded in April 1963 in Nashville, Tennessee at the RCA Victor Studio, alongside producer Chet Atkins. Six other songs were recorded during the session, including a cover of "I Will Follow Him".

According to Allmusic critic Richie Unterberger, "I Can't Stay Mad at You" was recorded in the popular "girl group" musical style. It included heavy choruses backed by a "wall-of-sound" that the Goffin-King pair was used to writing songs for. Unterberger also explains that the song displays similarities to Neil Sedaka's pop hit "Breaking Up Is Hard to Do", stating "'I Can't Stay Mad at You' begins with a whole verse worth of ultra-catchy doo wop syllables ('Shooby Dooby Doo Bob') that, frankly, is highly reminiscent of the similar patterns used in Neil Sedaka's No. 1 1962 hit 'Breaking Up Is Hard to Do' (written by Sedaka and Howard Greenfield). In fact, the whole song is fairly reminiscent of that previous Sedaka hit, though 'I Can't Stay Mad at You' is, to its credit, a little brighter and more exuberant." The song features a string section featuring violins being played in a high register.

== Release ==
In August 1963, "I Can't Stay Mad at You" was officially released as a single by RCA Victor, with the b-side being "It Was Only a Heart". As a country music artist, the song became Davis' twelfth top-twenty hit on the Billboard Hot Country Singles, peaking at No. 14. The record was an even bigger hit on the pop charts, becoming Davis' second top-ten hit on the Billboard Hot 100, reaching a peak of No. 7 in 1963. The song peaked at No. 2 on the Billboard easy listening chart. The song would become Davis' last single to enter the Billboard Pop top-forty; her follow-up singles would land on progressively-lower positions on the chart in subsequent months and years. "I Can't Stay Mad at You" was later issued onto Davis' studio album Let Me Get Close to You in 1964.

The B side "It Was Only a Heart" also received pop airplay and peaked at No. 92 on the Billboard Hot 100.

== Chart performance ==
Chart (1963)	Peak position
US Billboard Hot Country Singles	14
US Billboard Hot 100 Singles	7
US Billboard Hot Adult Contemporary Singles	2

== Personnel ==
- Floyd Cramer – piano
- Skeeter Davis – lead vocals
- Pete Drake – steel guitar
- Buddy Harman – drums
- Mary Hicks – organ
- Jerry Kennedy – guitar
- Anita Kerr Singers – background vocals
- Velma Smith – rhythm guitar
- Henry Strzelecki – bass

(Uncredited) String section featuring violins in the high register.
