= Gonna Get Along Without Ya Now =

Single by Teresa Brewer
- A-side: "Roll Them Roly Boly Eyes"
- Released: April 1, 1952
- Genre: Traditional pop
- Length: 2:53
- Label: Coral
- Songwriter: Milton Kellem

"Gonna Get Along Without Ya Now" is a popular song written by bandleader and occasional songwriter Milton Kellem. The first known recorded version was released in 1951 by Roy Hogsed. Since then it has been done in several styles and tempos.

== Teresa Brewer's recording ==
The version recorded by Teresa Brewer with an orchestra directed by Ray Bloch on January 10, 1952, was released by Coral Records as catalog number 60676 on April 5, 1952. It reached number 25 on the Billboard charts. It was done in a "swing" style, with big band backing (including mouth harp). Brewer later recorded an album version in 1964, which was done in a semi-Caribbean style.

== Patience and Prudence recording ==
Patience and Prudence had more success with the song when they recorded it in 1956, reaching number 11 on the chart. That rendition has come to be considered the benchmark version of the song due to the intimate harmony of the two young singing sisters. Their version brightened the melody somewhat, and later artists, like Teresa Brewer in her aforementioned second recording of the song, followed the brighter version.

== Other cover versions ==
The song has also been recorded by these artists:

- The Bell Sisters in 1956, using the alternate title "Boom Boom, My Honey" on the Bermuda Records label, with a simple, slightly calypso arrangement and Jamaican accents.
- Chet Atkins on his 1968 LP Solo Flights.
- In 1964, Skeeter Davis' version went to number 48 on the Hot 100 and number 25 in Canada. Davis's version reached the Top 10 on Country charts, peaking at number 8, and was included on her Let Me Get Close to You LP. It is considered by oldies enthusiasts to be "the" cover version. Where the Patience and Prudence version has an orchestral backing, the Davis version has a pop band backing of electronic organ, bass, and drums, with violin and backup singers.
- Tracey Dey, in 1964. Dey's version was done in a style emulating the Wall of Sound, which was popular with girl groups at the time. Her version peaked at number 51 and number 25 in Canada.
- The Vibrations (1966), who did a funk-style version.
- Trini Lopez (U.S. number 93, 1967).
- Brent Dowe and The Melodians (1967), who recorded the rocksteady version produced by Duke Reid.
- Penny Marshall and Cindy Williams, who recorded a version on their 1976 novelty LP, Laverne & Shirley Sing.
- Viola Wills (1979) did a version in "disco" or "Hi-NRG" style, with a slower tempo and heavy electronic instrumental backing. The Viola Wills version of the song peaked at number 52 on the U.S. disco chart, number 8 on the UK Singles Chart, number 37 in Australia and number 3 in New Zealand.
- Tina Charles on The Original British Pop Princess—Tina Charles—Greatest Hits.
- Kati Kovács in 1981, Mindig van valami baj veled.
- Bad Manners (1989), a ska version.
- The Lemonheads (1991).
- Maureen McGovern on her 1992 album, Baby I'm Yours.
- Mr. President (1995), done in a Eurodance style.
- Michelle, then known as Tanja Thomas (2006), dance style and tempo, on her album My Passion.
- Cristina del Valle, in Catalan, again in a dance style and tempo.
- Soraya Arnelas (2007), in both English and Spanish (not mixing the languages), dance style.
- She & Him, with vocals by Zooey Deschanel, covering Skeeter Davis's version of the song on their 2010 album Volume Two.
- UB40, on their Labour of Love IV album (2010) and as a single released on 25 January 2010.
- Aistra (1997), Lithuanian version "A-Ha"
- Štormas (1996), Lithuanian version "Nuostabi Diena"
- Lucecita Benitez (1964), Spanish version "No Seas Tan Bobo."
- Geraldo & His Orchestra (aka Living Strings) RCA
