= Optimistic (Skeeter Davis song) =

- Italian release picture sleeve

Single by Skeeter Davis
- B-side: "Blueberry Hill"
- Released: September 1961
- Recorded: June 29, 1961
- Studio: RCA Victor Studio B Nashville, Tennessee, U.S.
- Genre: Country, Nashville Sound
- Label: RCA Victor
- Songwriter: Aubrey Freeman
- Producer: Chet Atkins

Skeeter Davis singles chronology
"The Hands You're Holding Now" (1961)	"Optimistic" (1961)	"Where I Ought to Be" (1962)

"Optimistic" is a song written by Aubrey Freeman. In 1961, Skeeter Davis recorded and released the song as a single for RCA Victor.

"Optimistic" was recorded on June 29, 1961, at the RCA Victor Studio in Nashville, Tennessee, United States. The song was released as a single in September 1961, peaking at number ten on the Billboard Hot C&W Sides chart. The single became Davis' fourth top-ten hit on the country chart. The song was not originally issued onto an official album.

== Charts ==
Chart (1961)	Peak position
U.S. Billboard Hot C&W Sides	10
