= My Last Date (with You) =

- Italian release picture sleeve

Single by Skeeter Davis

from the album Here's the Answer
- B-side: "Someone I'd Like to Forget"
- Released: December 1960
- Recorded: October 10, 1960
- Studio: RCA Victor Studio B, Nashville, Tennessee
- Genre: Country, Nashville Sound
- Label: RCA Victor
- Songwriters: Boudleaux Bryant, Floyd Cramer, Skeeter Davis
- Producer: Chet Atkins

Skeeter Davis singles chronology
"(I Can't Help You) I'm Falling Too" (1960)	"My Last Date (with You)" (1960)	"The Hands You're Holding Now" (1961)

"My Last Date (with You)" is a song written by Boudleaux Bryant, Floyd Cramer, and Skeeter Davis. In 1960, Skeeter Davis recorded and released the song as a single for RCA Victor. The song was an answer song to Floyd Cramer's country pop crossover hit that year titled "Last Date".

"My Last Date (with You)" was recorded in October 1960 at the RCA Victor Studio in Nashville, Tennessee. The song was released as a single in December 1960, and it peaked at number four on the Billboard Magazine Hot C&W Sides chart later and number 26 on the Billboard Hot 100. The single became Davis' second top-10 hit single in a row on the country chart. It also became her second single to chart on the Hot 100 and her second on to chart among the top 40. In the later months, the song was issued onto Davis' second studio album titled Here's the Answer.

== Charts ==
Chart (1960–1961)	Peak position
U.S. Billboard Hot 100	26
U.S. Billboard Hot C&W Sides	4
