= Am I That Easy to Forget =

1958 country song

Single by Carl Belew
- B-side: "Such Is Life"
- Released: 1959
- Recorded: 1959
- Genre: Country
- Length: 2:25
- Label: Decca
- Songwriters: Carl Belew, W.S. Stevenson

Carl Belew singles chronology
"My Baby's Not Here (In Town Tonight)" (1958)	"Am I That Easy to Forget" (1959)	"Cool Gator Shoes" (1959)

"Am I That Easy to Forget"

Single by Debbie Reynolds
- B-side: "Ask Me to Go Steady"
- Released: December 1959
- Recorded: 1959
- Genre: Pop
- Length: 2:18
- Label: Dot
- Songwriters: Carl Belew, W.S. Stevenson

Debbie Reynolds singles chronology
"It Started With a Kiss" (1959)	"Am I That Easy to Forget" (1959)	"City Lights" (1960)

"Am I That Easy to Forget"

Single by Engelbert Humperdinck

from the album The Last Waltz
- B-side: "Pretty Ribbon"
- Released: 1967
- Genre: Pop
- Length: 3:05
- Label: Parrot
- Songwriters: Carl Belew, W.S. Stevenson
- Producer: Peter Sullivan

Engelbert Humperdinck singles chronology
"The Last Waltz" (1967)	"Am I That Easy to Forget" (1967)	"A Man Without Love" (1968)

"Am I That Easy to Forget" is a popular song written by country music singer Carl Belew with W.S. Stevenson and published in 1958. Belew recorded the song in Nashville on December 17, 1958, and released the single in March 1959, when it reached number nine on the U.S. country music chart. Other country music artists who have recorded cover versions of the song include Skeeter Davis (#11 country, 1960), Ernest Tubb (1960), Jerry Wallace (1962), Gene Vincent (1966), George Jones (1967), Patti Page (1968), Ann-Margret & Lee Hazlewood (1969), Jim Reeves (#12 country, 1973) and Prairie Oyster (1991).

In 1960, the singer and actress Debbie Reynolds recorded a version that reached number 25 on the U.S. pop chart. The highest charting version of the song on the U.S. pop chart was recorded by the singer Engelbert Humperdinck on August 11, 1967. Released as a single in late 1967 from his album The Last Waltz, it reached number 18 on the Hot 100 and number one on the Easy Listening chart in early 1968. Humperdinck's version was also a big hit in the United Kingdom, where it spent two weeks at number three on the UK Singles Chart, as well as in Ireland, where it spent three weeks at number one on the Irish Singles Chart. Humperdinck himself recorded a special version for Italy, in Italian, entitled "Dimenticarti non potrei" ("I couldn't forget you"). Petula Clark recorded the song in French as "Tu Reviendras Vers Ta Maison" ("You Will Come Back to Your Home") and Leon Russell recorded the song as "Hank Wilson" in 1973.

== Chart performance ==
=== Carl Belew ===
Chart (1959)	Peak position
US Billboard Hot Country Singles	9

=== Skeeter Davis ===
Chart (1960)	Peak position
US Billboard Hot Country Singles	11

=== Debbie Reynolds ===
Chart (1960)	Peak position
US Billboard Hot 100	25
US Hot R&B/Hip-Hop Songs (Billboard)	13

=== Esther Phillips ===
Chart (1963)	Peak position
US Billboard Bubbling Under-Hot 100 Singles	12

=== Engelbert Humperdinck ===
Chart (1968)	Peak position
Ireland (IRMA)	1
New Zealand (Listener)	13
South Africa (Springbok Radio)	10
UK Singles (OCC)	3
US Billboard Hot 100	18
US Adult Contemporary (Billboard)	1

=== Jim Reeves ===
Chart (1973)	Peak position
US Billboard Hot Country Singles	12
Canadian RPM Country Tracks	9
South Africa (Springbok Radio)	15

=== Orion ===
Chart (1981)	Peak position
Australia (Kent Music Report)	100

== See also ==
- List of Billboard Easy Listening number ones of 1968
- List of number-one singles of 1968 (Ireland)
