= Set Him Free =

Single by Skeeter Davis

from the album I'll Sing You a Song and Harmonize Too
- B-side: "The Devil's Doll"
- Released: February 1959
- Recorded: January 1959; Nashville, Tennessee, U.S
- Genre: Country, Nashville Sound
- Label: RCA Victor
- Songwriter(s): Skeeter Davis, Helen Moyers, Marie Wilson
- Producer(s): Chet Atkins

Skeeter Davis singles chronology
"The Slave" (1958)	"Set Him Free" (1959)	"Homebreaker" (1959)

"Set Him Free" is a song written by Skeeter Davis, Helen Moyer, and Marie Wilson. In 1959, Skeeter Davis recorded and released the song as a single for RCA Victor.

"Set Him Free" was recorded in January 1959 at the RCA Victor Studio in Nashville, Tennessee, United States. The song was released as a single in February 1959, and it peaked at number five on the Billboard Magazine Hot C&W Sides chart later that year. The single became Davis' highest-charting single to that point and her third solo hit. In November 1959, "Set Him Free" was issued onto Davis' debut studio album entitled, I'll Sing You a Song and Harmonize Too.

In 1959, "Set Him Free" became the first song by a female country artist nominated by the Grammy Awards.

In 1967, Davis re-recorded an updated version of "Set Him Free" and released it as a single in late 1967. The new version peaked at number fifty-two on the Billboard Hot Country Singles chart and was issued onto her studio album entitled, What Does It Take (To Keep a Man Like You Satisfied).

== Chart performance ==
Original recording

Chart (1959)	Peak position
U.S. Billboard Hot C&W Sides	5

Re-recording

Chart (1967)	Peak position
U.S. Billboard Hot Country Singles	52
