= The Davis Sisters (country duo) =

American country music duo

- Betty Jack and Skeeter Davis

Background information
- Origin: Dry Ridge, Kentucky, U.S.
- Genres: Country
- Years active: 1947–1956
- Labels: RCA Records, Fortune Records
- Past members: Betty Jack Davis; Skeeter Davis; Georgia Davis

The Davis Sisters were an American country music duo consisting of two unrelated singers, Skeeter Davis (born Mary Frances Penick) and Betty Jack Davis. One of the original female country groups, they are best known for their 1953 No. 1 country hit "I Forgot More Than You'll Ever Know" and the duo's debut single "Jealous Love" on Fortune Records.

== Rise to fame and success ==
The Davis Sisters were not related; Skeeter Davis was the stage name of Mary Frances Penick. She met Betty Jack Davis at Dixie Heights High School in Edgewood, Kentucky in 1947. During Penick's junior year of high school, she and Davis won a local yodeling contest, the prize for which was a time slot singing on a local daytime television show. The two were billed as the Davis Sisters, with Skeeter adopting Betty Jack's last name, despite their being unrelated. Their appearance on the local program led to them receiving singing opportunities on the Detroit radio station WJR's program Barnyard Frolics. After graduating from high school in 1949, Davis relocated to Detroit with Betty Jack, where they completed demonstration recordings for Fortune Records.

== Fortune Records ==
The duo began appearing regularly on radio shows in nearby Cincinnati, Ohio and Detroit, Michigan. They first started recording in Detroit at Fortune Records in 1952. The pair recorded "Jealous Love" (Fortune 170), a song written by Devora Brown, co-owner of the Fortune label. Two other singles followed in 1953: "Kaw-Liga / Sorrow And Pain" (Fortune 174) and "Heartbreak Ahead / Steel Wool" (Fortune 175).

== RCA ==
In 1953, they landed a recording contract with RCA Records. While recording for RCA, the sessions were backed up by future country star and producer Chet Atkins. That same year, they released their first single, "I Forgot More Than You'll Ever Know". The mournful and heartbreaking song became a No. 1 country hit, as well as a top 20 pop hit. While their vocals invoked the sound of older Appalachian harmony duos such as the Blue Sky Boys and the Delmore Brothers, the Nashville Sound backing made the overall sound more in line with their more polished contemporaries the Louvin Brothers.

== Tragedy and reformation ==
Shortly after the release of "I Forgot More Than You'll Ever Know", the Davis Sisters were in a car accident just outside of Cincinnati, Ohio on August 2, 1953, which killed Betty Jack instantly and seriously injured Skeeter.

Skeeter reformed the group with Betty Jack's older sister, Georgia. The new duo continued to perform and record until 1956, but failed to have another hit. "Georgia was a fine singer, but it just wasn't the same," Skeeter said in the liner notes to 1995's The Essential Skeeter Davis.

Skeeter Davis went on to a successful solo career. Davis continued to perform frequently throughout much of the 1990s and into 2000. In 2001, she became incapacitated by the breast cancer that would claim her life. While Davis remained a member of the Grand Ole Opry until her death, she last appeared on the program in 2002. She died of breast cancer in a Nashville hospice, at the age of 72, on September 19, 2004.

Georgia Davis died on February 16, 2022, at the age of 92.

== Discography ==
=== Compilation albums ===
List of albums, showing relevant details
Title	Album details
Memories	Release date: 1993; Label: Bear Family Records; Format: Compact disc

=== Singles ===
List of singles, with selected chart positions, and other relevant details
Title	Year	Peak chart positions		Album
Title	Year	US	US Cou.	Album
"Jealous Love" (with Roy Hall and His Cohutta Mountain Boys) (Note: Singles that were originally released on Fortune Records in 1954, but then re-released on the RCA Victor label.)	1952	—	—	non-album singles
"I Forgot More Than You'll Ever Know"	1953	18	1	non-album singles
"Sorrow and Pain" (Note: Singles that were originally released on Fortune Records in 1954, but then re-released on the RCA Victor label.)	1953	—	—	non-album singles
"Takin' Time Out for Tears"	1954	—	—	non-album singles
"Foggy Mountain Top"	1954	—	—	non-album singles
"Just Like Me"	1954	—	—	non-album singles
"The Christmas Boogie"	1954	—	—	non-album singles
"Everlovin' (A One Way Love)"	1954	—	—	non-album singles
"Fiddle Diddle Boogie"	1955	—	—	non-album singles
"I've Closed the Door"	1955	—	—	non-album singles
"Baby Be Mine"	1955	—	—	non-album singles
"Don't Take Him for Granted"	1956	—	—	non-album singles
"Lonely and Blue"	1956	—	—	non-album singles
"—" denotes a recording that did not chart or was not released in that territory.
