= The End of the World (Skeeter Davis song) =

1962 single by Skeeter Davis

- One reissue's single cover

Single by Skeeter Davis

from the album Skeeter Davis Sings The End of the World
- B-side: "Somebody Loves You", "Blueberry Hill"
- Released: December 1962
- Recorded: June 8, 1962
- Studio: RCA Studio B, Nashville
- Genre: Country pop; easy listening
- Length: 2:33
- Label: RCA Victor
- Songwriters: Arthur Kent; Sylvia Dee
- Producer: Chet Atkins

Skeeter Davis singles chronology
| "The Little Music Box" (1962) | "The End of the World" (1962) | "I'm Saving My Love" (1963) |

Audio
- "End Of The World" on YouTube

"The End of the World" is a pop song written by composer Arthur Kent and lyricist Sylvia Dee, who often worked as a team. They wrote the song for American singer Skeeter Davis, and her recording of it was highly successful in the early 1960s, reaching the top five on four different charts, including No. 2 on the main Billboard Hot 100. It spawned many cover versions.

== Background ==
"The End of the World" is a sad song about the aftermath of a romantic breakup. Dee, the lyricist, said she drew on her sorrow from her father's death to set the mood for the song.

Davis recorded her version with sound engineer Bill Porter on June 8, 1962, at the RCA Studios in Nashville, produced by Chet Atkins, and featuring Floyd Cramer. Released by RCA Records in December 1962, "The End of the World" peaked in March 1963 at No. 2 on the Billboard Hot 100 (behind "Our Day Will Come" by Ruby & the Romantics), No. 2 on Billboard's Hot Country Singles chart, No. 1 on Billboard's Easy Listening chart, and No. 4 on Billboard's Hot R&B Singles chart. It is the first, and, as of April 2019, only time that a song cracked the Top 10 (and Top 5) on all four Billboard charts. Billboard ranked the record as the No. 2 song of 1963.

In the Davis version, after she sings the whole song through in the key of B-flat-major, the song modulates up by a half step to the key of B, where Davis speaks the first two lines of the final stanza, before singing the rest of the stanza, ending the song.

"The End of the World" was played at Atkins' funeral in an instrumental by Marty Stuart. The song was also played at Davis's own funeral at the Ryman Auditorium. Her version has been featured in several films, TV shows, and video games.

== Chart performance ==
| Chart (1963) | Peak position |
|---|---|
| Australian Kent Music Report | 32 |
| Denmark Hitlisten | 6 |
| New Zealand Hit Parade | 3 |
| South Africa RiSA | 3 |
| UK Singles Chart | 18 |
| US Billboard Hot 100 | 2 |
| US Billboard Hot Country Singles | 2 |
| US Billboard Hot R&B Singles | 4 |
| US Billboard Easy Listening | 1 |
| US Cash Box Top 100 | 2 |
| US Cash Box Country Singles | 2 |

== Sonia version ==
"End of the World"

Single by Sonia

from the album Everybody Knows
- B-side: "Can't Help the Way That I Feel"
- Released: 13 August 1990
- Recorded: 1990
- Genre: Pop
- Length: 3:36: 3:29 (video version)
- Label: Chrysalis
- Songwriters: Arthur Kent, Sylvia Dee
- Producer: Stock, Aitken & Waterman

Sonia singles chronology
| "You've Got a Friend" (1990) | "End of the World" (1990) | "Only Fools (Never Fall in Love)" (1991) |

In 1990, British singer Sonia covered "End of the World". The fifth and final single from her debut album, Everybody Knows, it reached number 18 in the UK, the same chart position as the original, and number 18 too in Ireland. The single's B-side "Can't Help the Way That I Feel" also appeared on Sonia's debut album. This was her final single with Stock Aitken Waterman (SAW).

=== Critical reception ===
David Giles of Music Week praised this version as being a "polished" cover and "a bid for sophistication from the SAW prodigy [Sonia]".

=== Charts ===
1990 weekly chart performance for "End of the World"
| Chart (1990) | Peak position |
|---|---|
| Australia (ARIA Charts) | 153 |
| Europe (Eurochart Hot 100) | 53 |
| Ireland (IRMA) | 18 |
| Luxembourg (Radio Luxembourg) | 11 |
| UK Singles (Official Charts) | 18 |

== Other notable versions ==
The song was recorded by Julie London in 1963 for her album The End of the World. It was covered by the Carpenters on their album Now & Then, released in 1973.

During the summer of 1966, Swedish pop group Mike Wallace & The Caretakers recorded the song. Released as a single in August of that year, it was backed by the song "Whitsand Bay" written by Wallace, based on the tourist destination he'd often visited. It became a hit on Tio i Topp, entering the chart on August 6, 1966, at a position of number five. It topped the chart on August 27, staying on the top for a week. It exited the chart on October 29, at a position of number 14, having spent 13 weeks on the chart. On sales chart Kvällstoppen, it entered on August 16, 1966, at a position of 18. It would reach its peak of number two on September 6, being kept off the top by the Beatles "Yellow Submarine". It exited on November 8, at a position of 18, having spent 13 weeks on the chart.

In June 1965, the British pop group Herman's Hermits released their cover of the song as a B-side on their international hit "I'm Henry VIII, I Am" with a slower tempo.

To capitalize on the Caretakers version, Anna-Lena Löfgren recorded the song in Swedish, as "Allt är förbi", scoring a Svensktoppen hit for seven weeks between 9 October–19 November 1966.

Brilliant recorded a cover version in 1986, produced by Stock Aitken Waterman, the same group that produced Sonia’s later cover.

In 1995, American freestyle girl group Exposé included a cover of the song on their Greatest Hits compilation.

A version by Allison Paige peaked at number 72 on the Billboard Hot Country Singles & Tracks chart in May 2000.

The Dot Wiggin Band released a cover of "End of the World" as the last song on their album Ready! Get! Go! (2013), which Shintaro Sakamoto opined "actually sounds like the end of the world."

Joe Hisaishi incorporated the song into the final movement of his cantata for soprano, chorus and orchestra, also called The End of the World, featured on his 2025 album Joe Hisaishi Conducts.

== Appearances in media ==
- The song is featured in the 1960s period drama film Girl, Interrupted (1999).
- The song appears as a radio track in the video game Fallout 4.
- The song appears at the end of episode 12 ("The Grown-Ups") of the third season of Mad Men.
- The song is used as the opening and closing theme for the 2012 political thriller radio drama Pandemic, produced by BBC Radio 4.
- The Herman's Hermits version was heard during the closing scene of the third episode of The Queen’s Gambit.
- It was featured in the penultimate episode of the 2015 Fox TV series Wayward Pines.
- It was used in the 8th episode of season 1 of The Man in the High Castle. The lyrics were sung in Japanese, except for the title part.
- Patti Smith's cover is played during the end credits of the 2017 film Mother!
- The song is used in the 2017 short film Black Eyed Susan, which stars Denise Welch and her son, Louis Healy.
- A cover version by Sharon Van Etten is used in the 2019 film In the Shadow of the Moon.
- The song appears in the 2021 Marvel Studios film Eternals and was also featured in its first trailer.
- Multiple cover versions are used in the 2026 James Bond video game 007 First Light, first as the background music for the Webb gala, and second as a song Bond can play on a piano during a late gameplay sequence.
- The song appears in "Landscape with Invisible Hand" film by Corey Finley (2023).
- The song appears near the end of the 2022 Hulu film, Not Okay when the protagonist's lie about surviving a terrorist attack ends up turning her life upside down when she tells the truth online.
