= Skeeter Davis =

American singer (1931–2004)

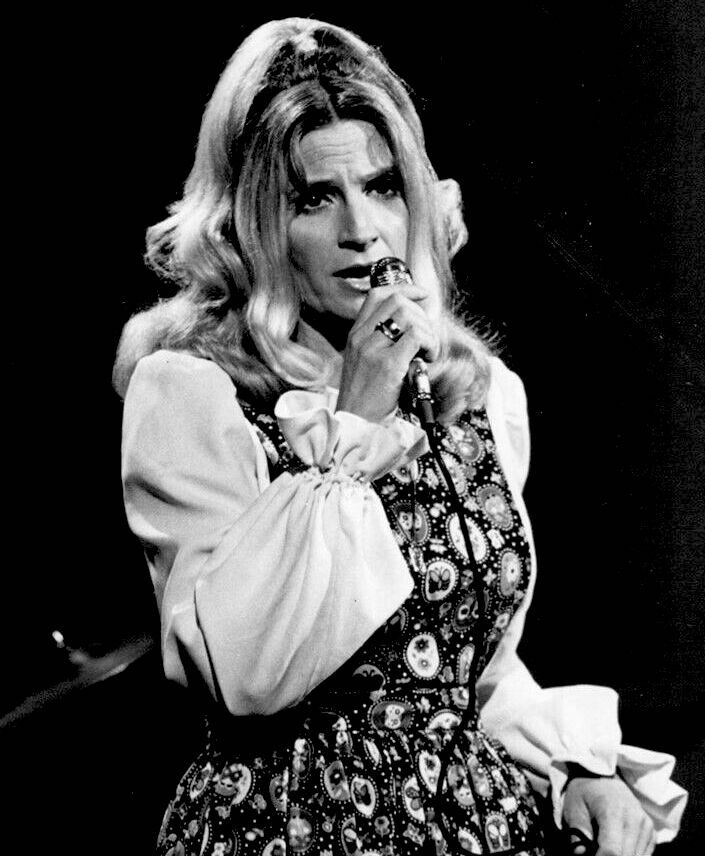
- Davis performing in 1972

Background information
- Born: Mary Frances Penick; December 30, 1931; Glencoe, Kentucky, U.S.
- Died: September 19, 2004 (aged 72) Nashville, Tennessee, U.S.
- Genres: Country; pop; Nashville sound
- Occupations: Singer; songwriter
- Instruments: Vocals; guitar
- Years active: 1947–2002
- Labels: RCA Victor; Mercury; 51 West; Tudor; Red Rooster; Atlantic
- Formerly of: The Davis Sisters
- Spouses: Kenneth DePew (m. 1956; div. 1959) Ralph Emery (m. 1960; div. 1964) Joey Spampinato (m. 1987; div. 1996)

Skeeter Davis (born Mary Frances Penick; December 30, 1931 – September 19, 2004) was an American country music singer and songwriter who sang crossover pop music songs including 1962's "The End of the World". She started out as part of the Davis Sisters as a teenager in the late 1940s, eventually recording for RCA Victor. In the late 1950s, she became a solo star.

One of the first women to achieve major stardom in the country music field as a solo vocalist, she was an acknowledged influence on Tammy Wynette and Dolly Parton, and was hailed as an "extraordinary country/pop singer" by The New York Times music critic Robert Palmer.

== Early life ==
Davis was born Mary Frances Penick on December 30, 1931, the first of seven children born to farmer William Lee and Sarah Rachel Penick (née Roberts), in Glencoe, Kentucky. (Note: Some sources list Davis's birthplace as Dry Ridge, Kentucky, where she spent her early childhood. However, in her 1993 autobiography, she states that she was, in fact, born in a small cabin along the bank of Eagle Creek in Glencoe, Kentucky.) Because her grandfather thought she had extra energy for a young child, he nicknamed Mary Frances "Skeeter" (slang for mosquito), a name she carried for the rest of her life.

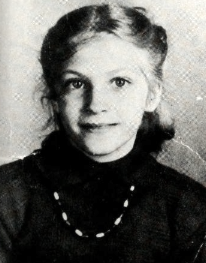
Davis in a school photo, at the age of 10

When Davis was a toddler, her great-uncle was convicted of murdering his brother (her maternal grandfather) in Indiana. After this incident, Davis recalled that her mother became a "bitterly depressed woman". Throughout her childhood, Davis's mother made multiple suicide attempts, several of which Davis herself prevented from being carried out: "I once slapped a bottle of Clorox she was drinking out of her mouth and sat on her hands to keep her from reaching for a butcher knife," she recalled. On one occasion, her mother attempted to leap from the family's apartment window with Davis and her infant brother in her arms. Her relationship with her mother remained strained throughout much of her life, and by Davis's account, she "couldn't seem to win my mother's respect and affection, [so] I turned my attention toward my daddy."

In the mid-1930s, the Penick family relocated to Cincinnati, Ohio, where they remained for several years before returning to Dry Ridge. They later moved to Erlanger, Kentucky, in 1947. Davis was raised a Protestant, attending Disciples of Christ churches. As an adolescent, Davis was inspired by the music of Betty Hutton, and also developed interest in musicals, memorizing songs from films such as Stage Door Canteen (1943) and I'll Be Seeing You (1944). She would sometimes stage routines in her backyard, dancing, singing, and telling ghost stories to neighborhood children. When Davis was in seventh grade, her father relocated to Oak Ridge, Tennessee, for work. Her siblings and she remained in the care of their mother, who during this time, became an alcoholic. In the summer of 1948, Davis and her family relocated to Covington, Kentucky, where her father was working as an electrician, and moved into a house owned by the Villa Madonna Academy, run by Benedictine nuns. Davis became fascinated by the sisters, and for a time considered becoming a nun.

While attending Dixie Heights High School in Erlanger, Skeeter met Betty Jack Davis, and the two became close friends, bonding over their love of music. They began singing songs and playing guitar together during breaks at school, which drew attention from their classmates, and they performed in several school talent shows. On a trip to the Grand Ole Opry, the two convinced a stage manager to allow them backstage, where they met Hank Williams and Chet Atkins.

== Career ==
=== 1948–1956: The Davis Sisters; rise to fame ===
During her junior year of high school, Skeeter and Betty Jack Davis won a local yodeling contest, the prize for which was a time slot singing on a local daytime television show. The two were billed as the Davis Sisters, with Skeeter adopting Betty Jack's last name, despite their being unrelated. Their appearance on the local program led to them receiving singing opportunities on the Detroit radio station WJR's program Barnyard Frolics. After graduating from high school in 1949, Davis relocated to Detroit with Betty Jack, where they completed demonstration recordings for Fortune Records; among these was the song "Jealous Love", which was released as a single in 1953.

RCA Victor producer Steve Sholes heard their demos and was impressed by their harmonies. In the spring of 1953, Skeeter and Betty Jack met with Sholes at RCA's headquarters in New York City, and were offered a recording contract. After signing the contract, they left New York to begin recording material in Nashville, Tennessee. On May 23, 1953, they recorded "I Forgot More Than You'll Ever Know", a song that had previously been recorded by Sonny James. The Davis Sisters toured regionally to support the single on live broadcast radio programs, though Davis recalled that both "were so insecure and uninformed about the [music] business." The single was a significant success, spending eight weeks at number one on the country charts in 1953, as well as making the top 20 on the pop charts. The record ranks number 65 on the Top 100 Country Singles of All Time, according to Billboard historian Joel Whitburn.

On August 1, 1953, the Davis Sisters performed on the WWVA evening show in Wheeling, West Virginia. After midnight, the two left Wheeling en route back to Covington. Around 7:00 am on August 2, near Cincinnati, a passing motorist fell asleep at the wheel, crashing head-on with the car in which Skeeter and Betty Jack Davis were riding. Betty Jack was killed in the collision, while Skeeter sustained serious head injuries. The driver of the car also survived. Newspaper bulletins at the time erroneously reported that both the Davis Sisters had been pronounced dead at Our Lady of Sorrow Hospital in Cincinnati.

Following the accident, Davis moved in with Betty Jack's mother, Ollie, while recovering from her injuries. She recounted in her autobiography that Ollie "took advantage of this tragic situation to suit her own ends”, alleging that she had kept Skeeter sedated with drugs from a local dentist and sequestered her in the house, where she repeatedly played the girls' records. Once Skeeter recovered, Ollie could "hardly wait for her chance to recreate the Davis Sisters", suggesting that Betty Jack's younger sister, Georgia, take her place in the singing duo. Davis reluctantly agreed, and six months after the accident, she resumed singing in the duo with Georgia Davis. In her autobiography, she wrote that she felt she had been brainwashed by Ollie and coerced into resuming the musical duo.

Between 1954 and 1956, Skeeter and Georgia released nine singles for RCA as the Davis Sisters, which they recorded in New York City and Chicago, and toured the United States as a part of the RCA Caravan of the Stars alongside Minnie Pearl, Hawkshaw Hawkins, and Chet Atkins, among others. The singles recorded with Georgia were notably less successful than the duo's former material, with low chart positions, though Davis felt, "the material was good." The two held a tribute performance for Betty Jack at the Grand Ole Opry in 1954. In 1955, the Davis Sisters were booked for a regional tour alongside Hank Snow, the Carter Sisters (minus June), and Elvis Presley. Davis recounted her friendship with Presley in her autobiography. The Davis Sisters formally disbanded in 1956, shortly after Davis's first marriage to Kenneth DePew.

=== 1957–1962: Early solo career ===
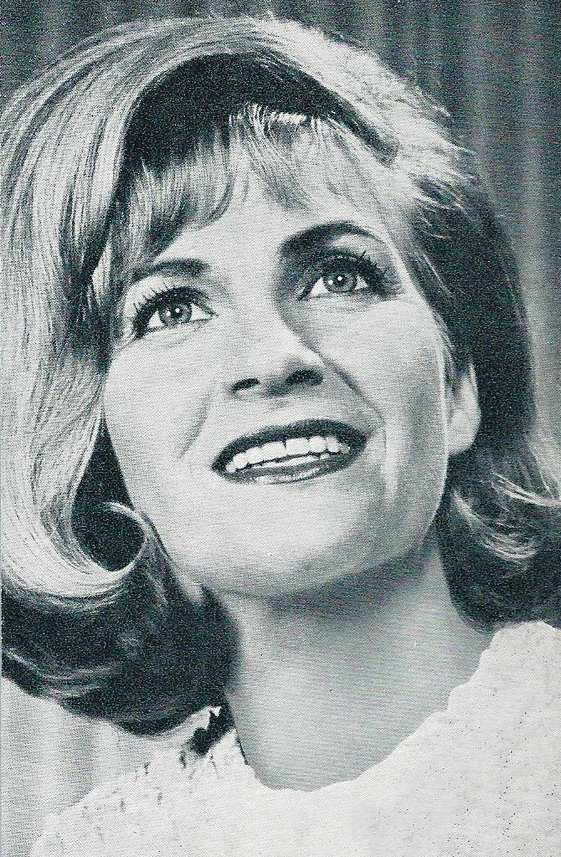
Davis in a publicity photo c. 1960

In the late 1950s during her marriage to DePew, Davis suffered from depression and "harbored a death wish" over the grief of Betty Jack's death, as well as her "contrived" marriage. She resumed performing as a solo act, touring with Ernest Tubb, and co-wrote and recorded the song "Set Him Free" for RCA, produced by Chet Atkins. The song earned Davis a Grammy Award nomination for best country recording. Sometime during this period, around 1958, Davis and DePew were divorced, and she relocated to Nashville. The same year, Davis recorded "Lost to a Geisha Girl", an answer song to Hank Locklin's hit "Geisha Girl", which reached the country number 15 and became her first solo hit. Atkins worked with Davis as a guitarist on all of these sessions. At Davis's suggestion, Atkins frequently multiple-tracked Davis's voice for harmony vocals to resemble the sound of the Davis Sisters. This echo can be found on several of her early solo hits, such as "Am I That Easy to Forget".

She subsequently cowrote and recorded another top-20 hit called ‘Homebreaker’ , which peaked at number 15 on the Hot Country Songs chart in November 1959. The same year, Davis joined the Grand Ole Opry. During this time, she toured with June Carter, and the two became good friends.

From 1960 to 1962, Davis had top-10 hits with the songs "(I Can't Help You) I'm Falling Too", "My Last Date (With You)", "Where I Ought to Be", and "Optimistic". "(I Can't Help You) I'm Falling Too" marked Davis's first entrance as a solo artist onto the Billboard pop charts in 1960 and resulted in her being invited to perform on Dick Clark's American Bandstand. The song went all the way to the top 40, unheard of for a female country singer at the time. In 1961, she scored a second pop hit with a lyric version (written by Skeeter) of Floyd Cramer's instrumental country pop smash "Last Date" called "My Last Date (With You)", which did even better, making the top 30 on the pop charts. Both of these songs did exceptionally well on the country charts, peaking at number two and number five, respectively.

=== 1963–1976: Crossover and critical accolades ===
In 1963, Davis achieved her biggest success with country pop crossover hit "The End of the World". The song just missed topping the country and pop charts that year, but it did top the adult contemporary charts. The record was also a surprise top-five hit on the rhythm and blues charts, making Davis one of the few white female singers to have a top-10 hit in that market. The single sold over one million copies and was awarded a gold disc. "The End of the World" soon became Davis's signature song. Davis achieved one other country-pop hit with the Gerry Goffin and Carole King-penned "I Can't Stay Mad at You", which peaked at number seven on the pop charts and number two on the Easy Listening chart in 1963. In 1964, she was nominated for a Grammy Award for Best Female Country Vocal Performance for her recording of "He Says the Same Things to Me".

Davis's success continued with "I'm Saving My Love" and 1964's "Gonna Get Along Without You Now", an updated cover of a 1956 hit by Patience and Prudence. Both made the top 10 on the country charts and cracked the Billboard Top 50 pop charts, though the success of "Gonna Get" was likely hampered by another remake of the song by vocalist Tracey Dey simultaneously climbing the charts to peak slightly lower than Davis's version. Later pop efforts, such as "Let Me Get Close to You" in July 1964, missed making the Billboard Hot 100, reflecting the changing nature of pop styles due to the ongoing British Invasion. In 1965, she recorded a duet with Bobby Bare called "A Dear John Letter", which just missed the country top 10. The following year, she earned her third Grammy nomination for "Sun Glasses", which peaked at number 30 on the Hot Country Songs chart.

In 1967, Davis was back in the top 10 with "What Does It Take (To Keep a Man Like You Satisfied)". Davis only achieved two other major country hits the rest of the decade, "Fuel to the Flame" (written by Dolly Parton, to whom Davis paid tribute with an album called Skeeter Sings Dolly in 1972), and "There's a Fool Born Every Minute". She received her fourth Grammy nomination for 1967's "What Does It Take".

In the late 1960s, she recorded several full-length albums, including two tribute works: Skeeter Davis Sings Buddy Holly (1967) and I Love Flatt and Scruggs (1968). Davis's recording of the antiwar song "One Tin Soldier", released in 1972, earned her an appearance on The Midnight Special. The single was a major success in Canada, peaking as a top-10 hit on RPM country and adult contemporary charts.

In 1970, Davis had another top-10 hit with "I'm a Lover (Not a Fighter)" and another duet with Bobby Bare with "Your Husband, My Wife". The following year, she had a hit with the autobiographical "Bus Fare to Kentucky". Subsequently, however, her chart success began to fade. Singles such as "It's Hard to Be a Woman" and "Love Takes a Lot of My Time" failed to crack the country top 40. Her last major hit was 1973's "I Can't Believe That It's All Over", which peaked at number 12 in country and number 101 on the pop chart. In the 1970s, she began regularly touring foreign countries such as Barbados, Singapore, and Sweden, where she retained a following.

Davis had the first and only controversy of her career when, during a 1973 Grand Ole Opry performance, she dedicated a gospel song to a group of young church workers whom she noted in her introduction had been arrested for evangelizing at a local mall. The Opry suspended her from membership after receiving complaints from some local policemen. She was reinstated at the Opry more than a year later. After losing several bookings during that period, Davis became active singing with a number of religious ministries and spent an extensive period evangelizing in Africa.

=== 1977–2004: Later life and career ===
Davis returned to the recording studio in 1976 with a brief stint on Mercury Records, which produced two single releases, including her last song to make the national charts, 1976's "I Love Us". In 1978, she recorded the first of several albums for minor record labels, which she did on occasion into the 1990s.

She recorded the album She Sings, They Play with NRBQ and later married their bassist, Joey Spampinato . Her autobiography, Bus Fare to Kentucky (named after her 1971 song), was published in 1993. In 1998, she wrote a children's book, The Christmas Note, with Cathie Pelletier.

== Personal life ==
=== Relationships and marriages ===
In 1956, Davis met Kenneth DePew, a railroad worker and acquaintance of Georgia's. The two began dating and married shortly after, though Davis later stated that he had married her for her income: "He saw the nice new furniture my money had bought the Davises; he saw the Oldsmobile and knew I had money in the bank. I could be a short cut to easy street." According to Davis, their marriage was not consummated until eight days into their honeymoon. The couple divorced in late 1959.

In 1960, she married WSM disc jockey Ralph Emery in Franklin, Kentucky. Their marriage was tumultuous, with Davis recalling that Emery was jealous and controlling of her, refusing to let her work more than a few days per month, obsessively calling her while she was on tour and recurrently accusing her of infidelity: "Ralph accused me of being with everybody from guitar players to agents to producers to my hairdresser and believe it or not, to my brother and sister. Male or female, it made no difference." The couple resided in Ridgetop, Tennessee, for a time, before Emery had a home built for them in the Brentwood area. In 1964, after four years of marriage, Davis divorced Emery after finding he had been unfaithful to her and conceived a child with another woman.

Davis later married NRBQ bassist Joey Spampinato in 1987. The couple divorced in 1996.

=== Vegetarianism ===
Davis became a vegetarian in 1974, and remained so for the rest of her life. She chose to abstain from eating meat after performing at a benefit concert in Kenya, where the concert organizers had killed and roasted a goat for the artists' banquet. "I really connected with that goat," she recounted, "and I couldn't bear to eat it." She declined to participate or allow her music to be used in several lucrative advertising campaigns for meat and meat-related products. Davis partly attributed her vegetarianism to her Christianity, as she felt killing animals for consumption was incongruent with her religious beliefs.

== Illness and death ==
In August 1988, Davis was diagnosed with breast cancer. She underwent a mastectomy of her right breast to treat the cancer and was in remission for several years before having a recurrence in 1996.

In 2001, Davis became incapacitated by her breast cancer, which had metastasized. The following year, she made her final performance on the Grand Ole Opry, performing "The End of the World". She died of breast cancer in a Nashville hospice on September 19, 2004, aged 72. She is interred at Williams Memorial Gardens in Franklin, Tennessee.

== Honors and recognition ==
The first female country singer ever nominated for a Grammy Award, Davis was nominated five times for Grammy Awards, though never winning:

- for Best Country & Western Performance:
  - 1959: "Set Him Free"
- for Best Female Country Vocal Performance:
  - 1964: “He Says The Same Things To Me”
  - 1965 for “Sunglasses”
  - 1967 “What Does It Take”
  - 1972 ”One Tin Soldier”

She won two BMI awards, for:

- "Set Him Free" (1959)
- "My Last Date (with You)"(ca.1961)

In 2013, she was inducted into the Kentucky Music Hall of Fame.

== Legacy ==
Davis's song "The End of the World" has been named as a major influence on several artists: Among them are Lou Reed, and 21st-century singer-songwriter Lana Del Rey, both of whom named it among their favorite recordings of all time. Bob Dylan also recorded a version of "I Forgot More Than You'll Ever Know" featuring the Davis Sisters' arrangements on his 1970 album Self Portrait. "The End of the World" was also used in the popular video game Fallout 4.

Nina Gordon, formerly of Veruca Salt, also covered the song on her 2000 album Tonight and the Rest of My Life.

Davis penned nearly 70 songs over the course of her career, her song "My Last Date with You" was also recorded by Ann-Margret, Pat Boone, Kay Starr, Joni James, and several others, in addition to Davis' original hit version. Deborah Harry recorded a remake of Davis' version in 1993 featuring Michael Stipe, a long-time Davis fan. (Conway Twitty wrote new lyrics for the instrumental in 1972 as "Lost Her Love (On Our Last Date)", which reached number one on the country chart, as did Emmylou Harris' remake of Twitty's version in 1983 retitled "Lost His Love (On Our Last Date)".)

== Sources ==
- Davis, Skeeter (1993). Bus Fare to Kentucky: The Autobiography of Skeeter Davis. New York: Birch Lane Press. ISBN 978-1-559-72191-2.
- Erlewine, Michael (1997). All Music Guide to Country: The Experts' Guide to the Best Recordings In Country Music (3rd ed.). Hal Leonard Corporation. ISBN 0-87930-475-8.
- Feldman, Christopher (2000). The Billboard Book of No 2 Singles. New York: Watson-Guptill. ISBN 0-8230-7695-4.
- Kingsbury, Paul, ed. (2004). The Encyclopedia of Country Music:The Ultimate Guide to the Music: The Ultimate Guide to the Music. Oxford: Oxford University Press. ISBN 0-195-17608-1.
- Murrells, Joseph (1978). The Book of Golden Discs (2nd ed.). London: Barrie and Jenkins Ltd. ISBN 0-214-20512-6.
- Whitburn, Joel (2002). Top Adult Contemporary: 1961-2001. Menomonee Falls, Wisconsin: Record Research.
- Whitburn, Joel (2005). Joel Whitburn's Top Country Songs: 1944–2005, Billboard. Menomonee Falls, Wisconsin: Record Research. ISBN 978-0-898-20165-9.
- Whitburn, Joel (2006). The Billboard Book of Top 40 Country Hits (2nd ed.). New York: Billboard Books. ISBN 0-8230-8291-1.
- Wilson, Scott (2016). Resting Places: The Burial Sites of More Than 14,000 Famous Persons (3rd ed.). Jefferson, North Carolina: McFarland. ISBN 978-1-476-62599-7.
- Wolfe, Charles K. (1996). Kentucky Country: Folk and Country Music of Kentucky. University Press of Kentucky. ISBN 0-813-10879-9.
