= After the Riot at Newport =

Live album by the Nashville All-Stars
- Released: 1960
- Recorded: July 4, 1960
- Genre: Jazz
- Length: 42:51
- Label: RCA Victor LPM-2302
- Producer: Steve Sholes, Richard Weize (re-issue)

Chet Atkins chronology
Mister Guitar (1959)	After the Riot at Newport (1960)	Teensville (1960)

After the Riot at Newport is an album by the Nashville All-Stars, which was recorded live after the cancellation of their appearance at the 1960 Newport Jazz Festival.

== History ==
This group of Nashville session players played a mixture of pop and jazz standards. The all-star lineup featured guitar legends Hank Garland and Chet Atkins, saxophonist Boots Randolph, African-American pianist/violinist Brenton Banks, pianist Floyd Cramer, bassist Bob Moore, drummer Buddy Harman, and vibes prodigy Gary Burton, who was only 17 years old at the time.

Even though the players were playing country music day-in and day-out in Nashville sessions, they had a deep love of jazz and played often at the Carousel Club on Printer's Alley in Nashville, Tennessee. When their much-anticipated festival performance was canceled due to an unruly crowd, the group documented their performance anyway, recording on the lawn of a mansion RCA had rented during the festival (depicted by the drawing on the cover).

Two of the songs, "Nashville to Newport" and "Riot-Chous" were composed for the occasion, the latter after the riot on the night prior to recording.

Other groups since have taken the name Nashville All-Stars.

== Reception ==
Professional ratings
Review scores
Source	Rating
AllMusic	4.5/5 stars

AllMusic critic Thom Owens called the album "a surprisingly jazzy effort, highllighted by some excellent leads by Atkins, yet it is a bit too down-home for jazzbos, and a bit too polished for country fans. Nevertheless, fans of pure musicianship will find plenty to treasure on the album."

== Reissues ==
- Originally released in 1960 by RCA, it was re-released on CD by Bear Family Records (BCD 15447) in 1989 with liner notes by Rich Kienzle, based on interviews with Bob Moore and other participants.
- And More Bears reissued the album as an expanded edition in July 2025. Packaged with a descriptive 72-page hardcover book, the album drew upon recently discovered first-generation session tapes. Among the eight previously unissued tracks were three songs by Andy and the Bey Sisters, a vocal trio featuring Andy Bey, Salome Bey, and Geraldine Bey.

== Track listing ==
=== Side one ===
1. "Relaxin'" (Jimmy Guinn) – 11:11
2. "Nashville to Newport" (Chet Atkins) – 3:18
3. "Opus de Funk" (Horace Silver) – 6:14

=== Side two ===
1. "'S Wonderful" (George Gershwin, Ira Gershwin) – 4:35
2. "'Round Midnight" (Bernie Hanighen, Thelonious Monk, Cootie Williams) – 4:39
3. "Frankie and Johnny" (Traditional) – 3:37
4. "Riot-Chous" (Hank Garland, Boots Randolph) – 8:57

== Personnel ==
- Hank Garland – guitar
- Chet Atkins – guitar
- Boots Randolph – alto and tenor saxophone
- Brenton Banks – piano, violin
- Floyd Cramer – piano
- Gary Burton – vibraphone
- Bob Moore – double bass
- Buddy Harman – drums

== Production notes ==
- Produced by Steve Sholes
- Mastered by Bob Jones
- Reissue producer, photography by Richard Weize
- Liner notes by George Wein
- Reissue Liner notes by Rich Kienzle
- Cover art by Jim Flora

== See also ==
- The Nashville A-Team
