= Hank Garland =

American guitarist and songwriter

Background information
- Born: Walter Louis Garland; November 11, 1930; Cowpens, South Carolina, U.S.
- Died: December 27, 2004 (aged 74) Orange Park, Florida, U.S.
- Genres: Jazz, country, rock and roll, pop
- Occupation: Musician
- Instruments: Guitar, six-string bass
- Years active: 1942-1961

Walter Louis Garland (November 11, 1930 – December 27, 2004), known professionally as Hank Garland, was an American guitarist and songwriter. He started as a country musician, played rock and roll as it became popular in the 1950s, and released a jazz album in 1960. His career was cut short when a car accident in 1961 left him unable to perform.

The Hank Garland biopic Crazy was released in 2008.

== Biography ==
Born in Cowpens, South Carolina, Garland began playing guitar at the age of six, and began to appear on local radio shows at 12. At 14 he moved to Spartanburg, South Carolina where he met Don Reno who gave him lessons, and worked with him on the WSPA-FM station in Spartanburg, both playing lead guitar.

He moved to Nashville at age 16, staying in Ma Upchurch's boarding house, where he roomed with Bob Moore and Dale Potter. At age 18, he recorded his million-selling hit "Sugarfoot Rag". He appeared on the Jubilee program with Grady Martin's band and on The Eddy Arnold Show. Garland is perhaps best known for his Nashville studio work with Elvis Presley from 1958 to 1961 which produced such rock hits as: "I Need Your Love Tonight", "A Big Hunk O' Love", "A Fool Such As I", "I Got Stung", "Stuck on You", "I'm Comin' Home", "I Feel So Bad", "Little Sister" and "(Marie's the Name) His Latest Flame". He worked with many country music and rock and roll musicians of the late 1950s and early 1960s, such as Patsy Cline, Brenda Lee, Mel Tillis, Marty Robbins, The Everly Brothers, Boots Randolph, Roy Orbison, Conway Twitty, and Moon Mullican.

Garland's guitar drove such classic recordings as Little Jimmy Dickens' "I Got a Hole in My Pocket"; Benny Joy's "Bundle of Love" and "I'm Gonna Move"; Jimmy Lloyd's (recorded under pseudonym of (Jimmie Logsdon) "You're Gone Baby" and "I've Got a Rocket in My Pocket"; Lefty Frizzell's "You're Humbuggin' Me"; Simon Crum's "Stand Up, Sit Down, Shut Your Mouth"; and Johnnie Strickland's (1935-1994) "She's Mine"; plus, seasonal staples "Jingle Bell Rock" with Bobby Helms, and Brenda Lee's "Rockin' Around the Christmas Tree". Don Gibson's "Sweet Sweet Girl" and "Don't Tell Me Your Troubles"; Patsy Cline's "Let the Teardrops Fall"; Ronnie Hawkins' "Jambalaya"; and Faron Young's "Alone with You" spotlighted Garland's guitar work.

He played with George Shearing and Charlie Parker in New York and went on to record Jazz Winds from a New Direction with Gary Burton on vibraphone, Joe Benjamin on double bass, and Joe Morello on drums. That session took place in Nashville in 1960.

That same year, Garland, along with other members of the Nashville "A-Team" of session players, was invited to perform at the Newport Jazz Festival. For years, these musicians unwound by playing jazz after hours at Nashville's Carousel Club. The group included Gary Burton on vibes, guitarist Chet Atkins, pianist Floyd Cramer, saxophonist Boots Randolph, bassist Bob Moore, drummer Buddy Harman and African-American violinist Brenton Banks, who played in the string sections that adorned many Nashville recordings. RCA Victor had a mobile recording unit there to record their performance, but when rioting prematurely ended the festival, the group performed (with the tapes rolling) on the porch of the mansion where they were staying. The album was released as After the Riot in Newport.

At the request of Gibson Guitar company president Ted McCarty, Garland and guitarist Billy Byrd influenced the design of the Byrdland guitar, which derived from the Gibson L-5, having a slimmer body and shorter scale for ease of playing.

In September 1961, a car crash left Garland in a coma. He regained consciousness and recovered with the help of his wife, Evelyn, and two daughters, but due to a brain injury sustained in the car accident, he was unable to return to the studios. After Evelyn died at the age of 38 in a car crash in Milwaukee, Wisconsin on December 2, 1965, Garland's parents took care of him until their deaths. He then went to live with his brother, Billy and wife Amy.

Garland suffered from constant ill health in his later years and died in Orange Park, Florida on December 27, 2004, of complications from a staph infection. He was 74 years old. He is interred in Jacksonville Memory Gardens in Orange Park.

== Discography ==
=== As leader ===
- Velvet Guitar (Harmony, 1960)
- After the Riot at Newport with the Nashville All-Stars (RCA Victor, 1961)
- Jazz Winds from a New Direction (Columbia, 1961)
- The Unforgettable Guitar of Hank Garland (Columbia, 1962)
- Hank Garland and His Sugar Footers (Bear Family, 1992)
- Subtle Swing (Sundazed, 2004)

=== As sideman ===
With Elvis Presley

- 50,000,000 Elvis Fans Can't Be Wrong: Elvis' Gold Records, Volume 2 (RCA Victor, 1959)
- Elvis Is Back! (RCA Victor, 1960)
- Something for Everybody (RCA Victor, 1961)
- Follow that Dream (EP) (RCA Victor, 1961)
- Pot Luck (RCA Victor, 1962)
- Elvis' Golden Records, Volume 3 (RCA Victor, 1962)

With others

- Red Foley and Ernest Tubb, Red and Ernie (Decca, 1956)
- Bobby Helms, Jingle Bell Rock, (Decca 30513A, November 1957)
- Janis Martin, The Female Elvis: The Complete Recordings (Bear Family, 1987) – rec. 1956–1957
- Ray Walker, Everybody's Hits But Mine (Columbia, 1961)
- The Everly Brothers, Both Sides of an Evening (Warner Bros., 1961)
- Don Gibson, Girls, Guitars, and Gibson (RCA Victor, 1961)
- Skeeter Davis, Blueberry Hill and Other Favorites (RCA Camden, 1965)
