= Hi-Fi in Focus =

- Original LP cover of Hi Fi in Focus

Studio album by Chet Atkins
- Released: October 1957
- Recorded: Nashville, TN
- Genres: Country, pop, classical
- Length: 27:23
- Label: RCA Victor LPM-1577 (Mono)

Chet Atkins chronology
Chet Atkins at Home (1957)	Hi-Fi in Focus (1957)	Chet Atkins in Hollywood (1959)

Alternative Cover
- Alternate LP cover of Hi-Fi in Focus

Hi-Fi in Focus is the eighth studio album recorded by American guitarist Chet Atkins, released in 1957.

In the same year, "The Rhythm Rockers (featuring Chet Atkins)" released a single of "Tricky"/"Peanut Vendor". It did not chart. An EP was also released with Myrna Lorre on the flip side.

== Reception ==
Professional ratings
Review scores
Source	Rating
Allmusic	4/5 stars

Allmusic music critic Richard S. Ginell praised the album and wrote: "suffice it to say that this is another lovingly played collection of a dozen tunes from what is now considered the great guitarist's most prized period on recordings".

== Reissues ==
- In 2007, Hi-Fi in Focus was reissued on CD with bonus tracks as Hi-Fi in Focus Plus on the Universe label.

== Track listing ==
=== Side one ===
1. "El Cumbanchero" (Rafael Hernández) – 2:01
2. "Ain't Misbehavin''" (Harry Brooks, Andy Razaf, Fats Waller) – 2:17
3. "Shadow Waltz" (Al Dubin, Harry Warren) – 2:23
4. "Anna (El Negro Zumbón)" (Roman Vatro, Franco Giordano) – 2:02
5. "Yesterdays" (Otto Harbach, Jerome Kern) – 2:18
6. "Portuguese Washerwoman" (Roger Lucchesi, André Popp) – 2:05

=== Side two ===
1. "Tiger Rag" (Harry DaCosta, Eddie Edwards, Nick LaRocca, Larry Shields, Harry Regas, Tony Sbarbaro) – 1:49
2. "Walk, Don't Run" (Johnny Smith) – 2:22
3. "Tara's Theme" (David, Max Steiner) – 2:24
4. "Johnson Rag" (Guy Hall, Henry Kleinkauf, Jack Lawrence) – 2:07
5. "Lullaby of the Leaves" (Bernice Petkere, Joe Young) – 2:37
6. "Bouree" (J.S. Bach) – 1:28
7. "Avorada (Little Music Box)" (Traditional) – 1:30

Additional tracks on the 50th Anniversary release Hi-Fi in Focus... Plus:

1. "Hidden Charm" (Rich) – 2:30
2. "Tricky" (Jenkins) – 2:40
3. "Martinique" (DeParis) – 2:37
4. "Dig These Blues" (Chatmon, Greene) – 2:24
5. "Colonial Ballroom" (Atkins, Thompson) – 2:26
6. "August Moon" (Bradley, Cunow) – 2:37
7. "The Red Leaves Of Autumn" (O'Connell) – 2:17
8. "Its About Time" (Hoff) – 2:27
9. "Dont Tease My Heart" (Allan, Stoalting) – 2:27
10. "Fascinating Melody" (O'Connell) – 2:49
11. "Saw Mill River Road" (O'Connell) – 2:39
12. "Delightful Interlude" (O'Connell) – 2:33
13. "Head Over Heels" (Stone) – 2:43
14. "I Must Be Losing My Heart" (Sterling) – 2:10
15. "I Wont Cry Anymore" (Allan, Miller) – 2:00
16. "When Its Cherry Blossom Time" (Bradley) – 2:03

== Personnel ==
- Chet Atkins – guitar, vocals
- Bob Moore (musician) – bass
- Buddy Harman – drums
- Floyd Cramer – piano
