= Songs of the Century =

American music education project for categorization of popular songs

The "Songs of the Century" list is part of an education project by the Recording Industry Association of America (RIAA), the National Endowment for the Arts, and Scholastic Inc. that aims to "promote a better understanding of America's musical and cultural heritage" in American schools. Hundreds of voters, who included elected officials, people from the music industry and from the media, teachers, and students, were asked in 2001 by the NEA (National Endowment for the Arts) and the RIAA (Recording Industry Association of America) to choose the top 365 songs (not necessarily by Americans) of the 20th century with historical significance in mind. RIAA selected the voters, and about 15% (200) of the 1,300 selected voters responded.

== The list ==
The list of the top 25 songs, in the order of votes received. Each song is followed by the name of the artist who made the most notable recording of the song.

Rank	Title	Artist	Year
1	"Over the Rainbow" (Harold Arlen, E.Y. Harburg)	Judy Garland	1939
2	"White Christmas" (Irving Berlin)	Bing Crosby	1942
3	"This Land Is Your Land" (Woody Guthrie)	Woody Guthrie	1940
4	"Respect" (Otis Redding)	Aretha Franklin	1967
5	"American Pie" (Don McLean)	Don McLean	1972
6	"Boogie Woogie Bugle Boy" (Don Raye, Hughie Prince)	The Andrews Sisters	1941
7	West Side Story (album)	Leonard Bernstein and Stephen Sondheim	1957
8	"Take Me Out to the Ball Game" (Jack Norworth, Albert Von Tilzer)	Billy Murray	1908
9	"You've Lost That Lovin' Feelin'" (Phil Spector, Barry Mann and Cynthia Weil)	The Righteous Brothers	1964
10	"The Entertainer" (Scott Joplin)	Scott Joplin	1902
11	"In the Mood" (Wingy Manone, Andy Razaf, Joe Garland)	Glenn Miller Orchestra	1940
12	"Rock Around the Clock" (Max C. Freedman, James E. Myers)	Bill Haley & His Comets	1954
13	"When the Saints Go Marching In"	Louis Armstrong	1938
14	"You Are My Sunshine"	Jimmie Davis	1939
15	"Mack the Knife" (Kurt Weill, Bertolt Brecht)	Bobby Darin	1959
16	"(I Can't Get No) Satisfaction" (Mick Jagger, Keith Richards)	The Rolling Stones	1965
17	"Take the 'A' Train" (Billy Strayhorn, Joya Sherrill)	Duke Ellington Orchestra	1941
18	"Blueberry Hill" (Larry Stock, Al Lewis)	Fats Domino	1956
19	"God Bless America" (Irving Berlin)	Kate Smith	1938
20	"The Stars and Stripes Forever" (John Philip Sousa)	Sousa's Band	1897
21	"I Heard It Through the Grapevine" (Norman Whitfield, Barrett Strong)	Marvin Gaye	1968
22	"(Sittin' On) The Dock of the Bay" (Redding, Steve Cropper)	Otis Redding	1967
23	"I Left My Heart in San Francisco" (George C. Cory Jr., (Douglass Cross)	Tony Bennett	1962
24	"Good Vibrations" (Brian Wilson, Mike Love)	The Beach Boys	1966
25	"Stand by Me" (Ben E. King, Leiber and Stoller)	Ben E. King	1961
