= Finger-Style Guitar =

- Cover of the original release of the LP

Studio album by Chet Atkins
- Released: 1956
- Recorded: Oct 22–Nov 29, 1956, Nashville, TN
- Genre: Country, country pop, classical crossover
- Length: 27:16
- Label: RCA Victor LPM-1383
- Producer: Chet Atkins

Chet Atkins chronology
| Chet Atkins in Three Dimensions (1955) | Finger-Style Guitar (1956) | Chet Atkins at Home (1957) |

Alternative Cover
- Cover of the second release of the LP

Finger-Style Guitar is the sixth studio album by American guitarist Chet Atkins, released in 1956.

== History ==
The original LP consisted of a light rhythm section on the first side and Chet solo on side two.

The four Frank Loesser tunes on the re-release are from the 1956 musical The Most Happy Fella with vocals by Eddy Arnold, all released on an RCA Victor EP. Also included are two duets with Hank Snow and a single released by The Rhythm Rockers. "Blue Echo" was co-written with Boudleaux Bryant, who also co-wrote "How's the World Treating You" and others with Chet. "Blue Echo" was later covered by Lenny Breau on his album Boy Wonder.

Finger-Style Guitar was recorded in one day.

== Reception ==
Professional ratings
Review scores
| Source | Rating |
|---|---|
| Allmusic | 4/5 stars |

Allmusic music critic Richard S. Ginell praised the album and wrote "In general, the tunes with rhythm on side one are more ingratiating than the unaccompanied pieces on side two, yet they all display a relaxed, confident musicality at all times."

== Reissues ==
- Finger-Style Guitar was re-released with an additional 10 tracks in 2006 as Finger-Style Guitar.. Plus on the Universe label.

== Track listing ==
=== Side one ===
1. "Swedish Rhapsody" (Hugo Alfvén) – 2:30
2. "Liza (All the Clouds'll Roll Away)" (George Gershwin, Ira Gershwin, Gus Kahn) – 2:45
3. "In the Mood" (Joe Garland, Andy Razaf) – 2:15
4. "Heartaches" (Al Hoffman, John Klenner) – 2:05
5. "The Glow Worm" (Paul Lincke, Johnny Mercer) – 2:14
6. "Dance of the Golden Rod" (Merle Travis) – 1:58

=== Side two ===
1. "Petite Waltz" (Traditional) – 2:48
2. "La Adelita" (Francisco Tárrega) – 1:35
3. "Gavotte in D" (François Joseph Gossec) – 1:39
4. "Unchained Melody" (Alex North, Hy Zaret) – 2:55
5. "Waltz in A Flat" (Johannes Brahms) – 1:47
6. "Malaguena" (Ernesto Lecuona) – 2:45

Additional tracks:

1. "The Lady Loves Me" (Giese, Heather, Long, Moesser)
2. "New Spanish Two Step" (Bob Wills) (guitar duet with Hank Snow)
3. "Reminiscing" (Snow) (guitar duet with Hank Snow)
4. "Warm All Over" (Frank Loesser)
5. "Big D" (Loesser)
6. "Don't Cry" (Loesser)
7. "Standing on the Corner" (Loesser)
8. "Trambone" (Atkins)
9. "Peanut Vendor" (Wolfe Gilbert, Moises Simons, Marion Sunshine) (with The Rhythm Rockers)
10. "Blue Echo" (Atkins, Boudleaux Bryant)

CD cover of re-issue of Finger-Style Guitar... Plus

== Personnel ==
- Chet Atkins – guitar
- Floyd Cramer – piano
- Farris Coursey – drums
- Jim Carney – drums
- Ernie Newton – bass
- Jack Shook – rhythm guitar
- Hank Snow – guitar (on "New Spanish Two Step" and "Reminiscing")
