= Last Date =

Last Date may refer to:

- "Last Date" (song), a 1960 instrumental by Floyd Cramer; covered with vocals by Conway Twitty in 1972; both versions covered by several performers
- Last Date (Emmylou Harris album), 1982
- Last Date (Eric Dolphy album), 1965
- Last Date (Lawrence Welk album), 1960
- "The Last Date", a 1995 episode of Roseanne
