= Printer's Alley =

Alley in Nashville, Tennessee, US

- Printers Alley Historic District
- U.S. National Register of Historic Places
- U.S. Historic district
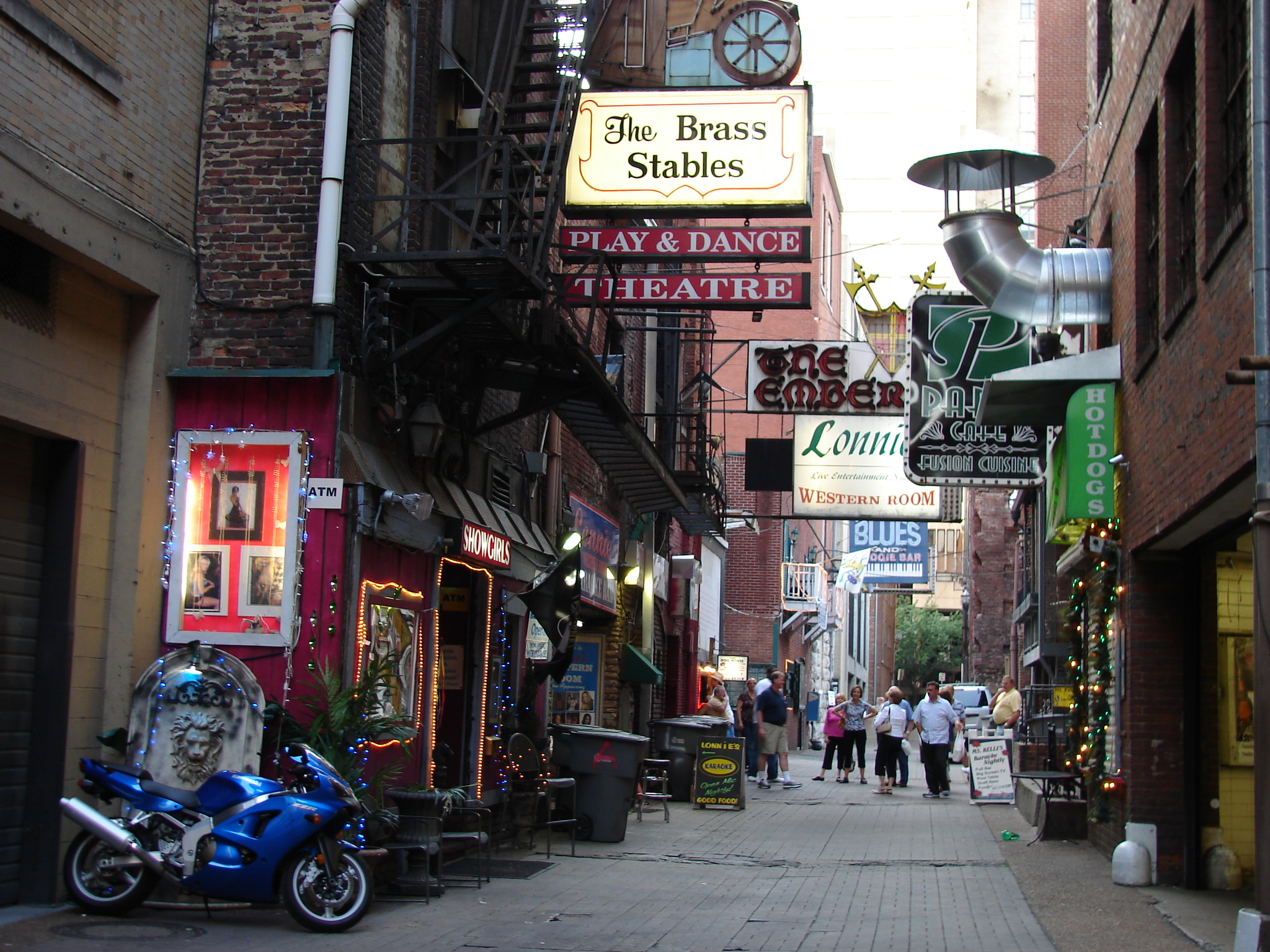
- Numerous bars, nightclubs, and restaurants occupy Printer's Alley.

- Location within Tennessee
- Location: Roughly bounded by 3rd and 4th Aves., Bank Alley, and both sides of Church St., Nashville, Tennessee
- Coordinates: 36.1640°N 86.7784°W
- Area: 5 acres (2.0 ha)
- Architectural style: Italianate, Queen Anne, Romanesque
- NRHP reference No.: 82003964
- Added to NRHP: August 26, 1982

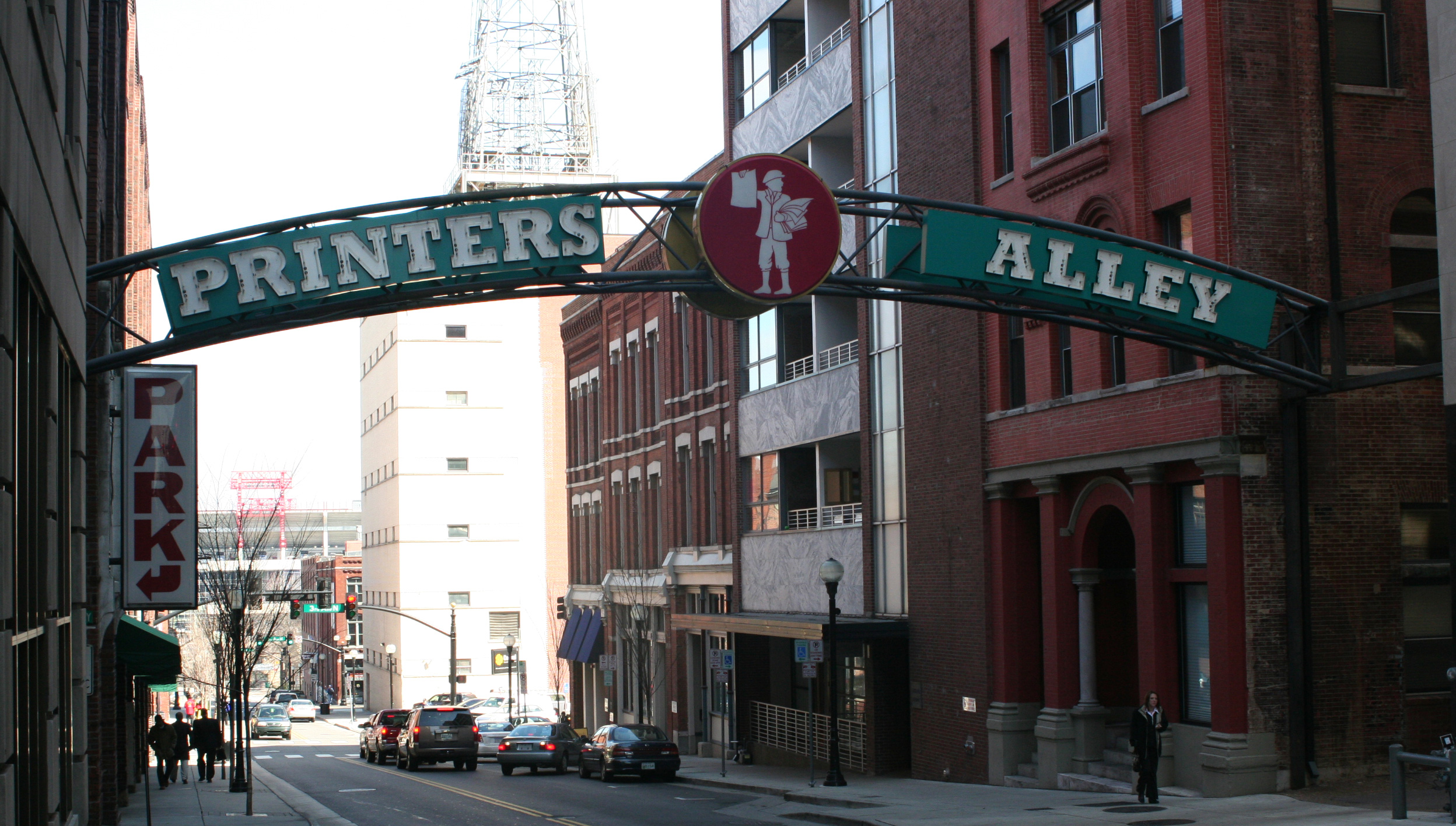
A large sign marks the entrance to Printer's Alley on Church Street.

Printer's Alley is a famous alley in downtown Nashville, Tennessee, U.S., getting its name from the numerous printing houses that were located there in the early 1900s. The alley runs between Union and Church Street, and 3rd Avenue North, and 4th Avenue North, and is the home of a nightclub district that dates back to the 1940s.

== History ==
The area now called Printer's Alley was created thanks to a gift of land by a Virginia businessman, George Michael Deadrick, to the city of Nashville in the 1780s.

It became the center of printing in Nashville starting around 1830. By the beginning of the 20th century, Printer's Alley was the center of the publishing industry in Nashville. Prior to that, it had been the location where men would hitch their horses when going to the courthouse. By 1915, the area was the location of two large newspapers – The Tennessean and the Nashville Banner – along with ten print shops, and thirteen publishers. The last printing company to leave the ally was the Ambrose Printing Company in 1977.

It was also the home to hotels, gambling halls, restaurants and saloons, along with brothels, and by the late 19th century, it was referred to as the Men's Quarter. When Prohibition went into effect in 1909, many of those establishments became speakeasies. However, restaurants and clubs in the alley served liquor anyway–thanks to protection from politicians and police–often claiming it had been "brown bagged" (brought in by customers).

Prohibition was repealed in Tennessee 1937, four years after the national repeal, however alcohol could not be sold by the glass. In response, restaurant and saloon owners created mixer bars where customers could bring their own liquor that was mixed by bartenders at the venue. In theory, patrons of these "member's bars" were supposed to bring a bottle with them on each visit, or have a bottle held with their name on it. In practice, purchasing a drink at these establishments was quite easy.

In the late 1940s, gangsters like Jimmy Washer, James "Slow" Barnes, Bob Carny, and David "Skull" Schulman had found a way to blend fine dining with burlesque dancing and live music. Restaurants included The Captain's Table, The Brass Rail Stables, The Embers, The Black Poodle Lounge, the Voo Doo Lounge and The Rainbow Room, which operated with this model for approximately 30 years. These establishments saw performances by famous burlesque dancers including Dixie Evans, Shannon Doah, and Kitten Natividad.

Printer's Alley has seen performances by many well known musicians and performers. Among them were Chet Atkins, Floyd Cramer, Denise Darcel, Hank Garland, Jimmy Hendrix, Boots Randolph, Jeannie Seely, the Supremes, Ernie Terrell, Mel Tillis, Dottie West, and Hank Williams.

In 1968, alcohol was fully legalized in Nashville, which negatively impacted the businesses of Printer's Alley.

By the late 1980s, longtime club proprietor David "Skull" Schulman, owner of the Rainbow Room, was the last remaining direct link to the historical Printer's Ally. Schulman had transformed the venue into a live music establishment. In 1998, Schulman was murdered by two robbers shortly before his club was due to open. Some believe Schullman's ghost still haunts the venue.

Paul McCartney mentioned Printer's Alley in his song "Sally G.", released as the B-side of Paul McCartney & Wings 1974 single "Junior's farm".

In 1982, Printer's Alley was listed as a Historic District on the National Register of Historic Places by the National Park Service.

Today, Printer's Alley is home to numerous restaurants and nightclubs.

== See also ==
- Music Row
- Tin Pan Alley
