= Hum & Strum Along with Chet Atkins =

Studio album by Chet Atkins
- Released: August 1959
- Recorded: February 1–3, 1959 in Nashville, TN
- Genre: Country
- Length: 28:19
- Label: RCA Victor LSP-2025 (Stereo)
- Producer: Chet Atkins

Chet Atkins chronology
Chet Atkins in Hollywood (1959)	Hum & Strum Along with Chet Atkins (1959)	Mister Guitar (1959)

Hum & Strum Along with Chet Atkins is the tenth studio album by American guitarist Chet Atkins, released in 1959. This is a country-themed "listener participation" album in the vein of the "Sing Along With Mitch" series of albums by Mitch Miller. It came packaged in a gatefold with a lyric and guitar/ukulele chord booklet. It was reissued as an LP in 1961.

== Reception ==
Professional ratings
Review scores
Source	Rating
Allmusic	2/5 stars

Allmusic music critic Richard S. Ginell wrote of the album; "An innocuous period piece through and through, notable only for some witty and elegant Atkins fills that somehow get by the concept."

== Track listing ==
=== Side one ===
1. "In the Good Old Summertime" (George Evans, Ren Shields) – 2:08
2. "Beautiful Brown Eyes" (Alton Delmore, Arthur "Guitar Boogie" Smith) – 2:43
3. "The Prisoner's Song" (Guy Massey) – 2:19
4. "Titanic" (Dean Hudson) – 2:20
5. "Tennessee Waltz" (Pee Wee King, Redd Stewart) – 2:03
6. "Sweet Bunch of Daisies" (Atkins, Boudleaux Bryant) – 2:12

=== Side two ===
1. "John Henry" (Traditional) – 2:23
2. "Birmingham Jail" (Traditional) – 2:56
3. "Music! Music! Music!" (Bernie Baum, Stephen Weiss) – 1:55
4. "Cold, Cold Heart" (Hank Williams) – 2:29
5. "Bill Bailey" (Hughie Cannon) – 2:15
6. "Goodnight Irene" (Lead Belly, Alan Lomax) – 2:35

== Personnel ==
- Chet Atkins – guitar
- Bob Ferris – engineer
