= Janis Martin =

American singer-songwriter

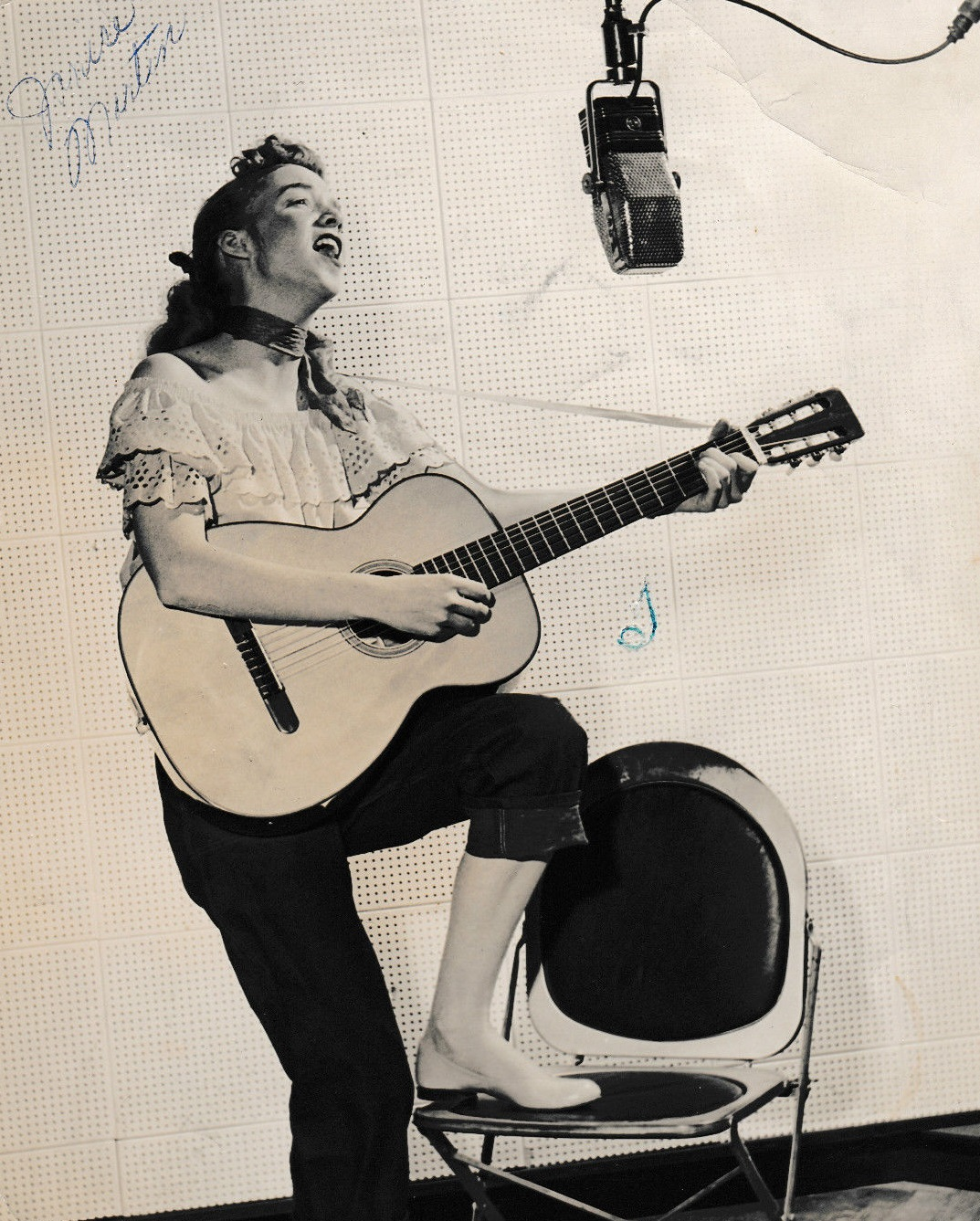
- Martin in 1956

Background information
- Born: Janis Darlene Martin; March 27, 1940
- Origin: Sutherlin, Virginia, United States
- Died: September 3, 2007 (aged 67)
- Genres: Rockabilly, country, rock and roll
- Occupation: Singer
- Years active: 1956–1960, 1970s–2007
- Labels: RCA, Palette

Janis Darlene Martin (March 27, 1940 – September 3, 2007) was an American rockabilly and country music singer. She was one of the few women working in the male-dominated rock and roll music field during the 1950s and one of country music's early female innovators. Martin was nicknamed the Female Elvis for her dance moves on stage, similar to those of Elvis Presley.

== Biography ==
=== Early life and rise to fame ===
Martin was born in Sutherlin, Virginia, east of Danville. Her mother was a stage mother, and her father and uncle were both musicians. Before she was six, Martin was already singing and playing the guitar, inspired by Eddy Arnold and Hank Williams. Over the years, this resulted in statewide contests with over 200 contestants, which she won. As a result, Janis was asked to play on the same bill as Cowboy Copas and Sunshine Sue. Through them Martin became a member of the Old Dominion Barndance on WRVA, which came out of Richmond every Saturday Night on CBS network. When she was in her mid-teens, she was appearing with country singers including Arnold, Hank Snow, The Browns and Jim Reeves. She soon claimed she was tired of country music and began a rock and roll career.

=== Teen rock and roll star ===
The WRVA station announcer, Carl Stutz, wrote a song titled "Will You Willyum", and asked Martin to sing the song live on stage that Saturday night so that he could make a demo tape to send to his publisher in New York. A week later, Stutz called Martin to tell her that RCA Victor was interested in recording "Will You Willyum". As it happened, the publisher offered "Will You Willyum" to Steve Sholes, a producer at RCA Victor, and asked whether Sholes had an artist to record it. Apparently Sholes replied "Well, who's the girl doin' the demo?"

At age 15, Martin signed with RCA Victor in March 1956, just two months after Elvis Presley joined the label. She recorded "Will You Willyum" on March 8, 1956, backed by her own composition "Drugstore Rock 'n Roll".

The song became the biggest hit of her career, selling 750,000 records. Soon, Martin was performing on American Bandstand, The Today Show, and Tonight Starring Steve Allen. She also appeared on Jubilee USA and the Grand Ole Opry in Nashville, Tennessee, becoming one of the younger performers to ever appear. Billboard named her Most Promising Female Vocalist that year.

Presley and RCA were so impressed with Martin's stage presence that they dubbed her the Female Elvis. Presley sent a dozen red roses to her when she appeared at the RCA Victor convention in Miami, Florida. Colonel Tom Parker, Elvis' manager, offered to take over her management seeing the potential of a successful double "boy-girl" bill. Just before, due to his extremely taxing touring schedule, Elvis had collapsed on stage in New York due to exhaustion. Safeguarding the young Janis Martin from this, her parents decided not to accept Parker's offer and instead go with the head of the Old Dominion shows. RCA chose Martin to tour as a member of the Jim Reeves show and continued recording rock and roll and country material that ended up being successful on both charts, including "My Boy Elvis", "Let's Elope Baby", her cover of Roy Orbison's song "Ooby Dooby", and "Love Me to Pieces".

On January 7, 1956, Martin eloped with her boyfriend, a paratrooper. She told her parents of her marriage only after her husband was safely shipped overseas in Germany. Her father tried to have it annulled because she was only 15 years old. Eventually, the matter was left, but Janis' mother ordered her to keep her marriage a secret to safeguard her career. In 1957, Janis went on a USO tour in Europe with Jim Reeves, Del Wood (a pianist famous for performing the song "Down Yonder"), The Browns, and Hank Locklin. Her husband got a 30-day leave and went on the road with her, which resulted in her getting pregnant with her son. Martin's teenage pregnancy caused RCA Victor to drop her in 1958. It was probably during this period that a 10" LP album titled Janis and Elvis was released in South Africa. This was recalled immediately upon request from the U.S. because it suggested that the two performers were singing together. Although King Records and Decca Records were interested, she signed with the Belgian label Palette in 1960.

=== Later career ===
By 1960, Martin was on her second marriage, and her husband demanded she leave the music business. In the 1970s, she began performing again with her newly formed band, The Variations. In 1975, she was working for the Halifax, Virginia, Police Department when music historian Dennis West tracked her down. Edd Bayes, a record collector from Maryland, asked Dennis for her address, which Dennis gave to him. He then coaxed her to appear locally and tell her story in Goldmine magazine. Martin toured through Europe as part of the rockabilly revival there, and in 1979 Bayes convinced RCA to pull four Martin songs from their vault, which were then released on Dog Gone Records in 1977. Edd Bayes took one of the songs that had been recorded twice ("Love Me Love") at different tempos and added the 'cha cha' to the title. In the 1980s, the Bear Family label gathered Martin's complete record history with the compilation album The Female Elvis. Since the early 1980s Janis started performing again at Rockabilly shows throughout Europe and the US. One of her live shows was released on a CD called Here I Am on Hydra Records. In 1995, Martin appeared on Rosie Flores's Rockabilly Filly album for HighTone Records. Flores recorded an album with Martin six months before her death, but it was not released until September 18, 2012, as The Blanco Sessions by Cow Island Music.

=== Death ===
Martin died from cancer on September 3, 2007, at Duke University Medical Center in Durham, North Carolina. Her only son, Kevin Parton, had died that January.

== Honors ==
In 2010, the Library of Virginia posthumously honored Martin as a Virginia Women in History because of her musical career.

== Discography ==
=== Compilation albums ===
List of compilation albums, showing all relevant details
Title	Album details
Rockin' Rollin' Janis, Vol 1	Released: 1976; Label: Country Classics Library; Formats: Vinyl
Rockin' Rollin' Janis, Vol 2	Released: 1977; Label: Country Classics Library; Formats: Vinyl
The Female Elvis: The Complete Recordings	Released: 1987; Label: Bear Family; Formats: Vinyl, CD
Here I Am	Released: August 14, 2001; Label: Hydra; Formats: CD
The Blanco Sessions	Released: October 16, 2012; Label: Cow Island; Formats: Vinyl, CD

=== Singles ===
List of singles, with selected chart positions
Title	Year	Peak chart positions	Album
Title	Year	US	Album
"Will You Willyum"	1956	35	—N/a
"Ooby Dooby"	1956	—	—N/a
"My Boy Elvis"	1956	—	—N/a
"Barefoot Baby"	1956	—	—N/a
"Two Long Years"	1957	—	—N/a
"Love and Kisses"	1957	—	—N/a
"All Right Baby"	1957	—	—N/a
"Cracker Jack"	1958	—	—N/a
"Bang Bang"	1958	—	—N/a
"Hard Times Ahead"	1960	—	—N/a
"Teen Street"	1960	—	—N/a
"I'm Movin' On"	1977	—	—N/a
"Rockin' All Over the World"	1978	—	—N/a
"—" denotes a recording that did not chart or was not released in that territory.
