= Chet Atkins at Home =

Studio album by Chet Atkins
- Released: 1957
- Recorded: Nashville, TN
- Genre: Country, pop, classical
- Label: RCA Victor LPM-1544
- Producer: Chet Atkins

Chet Atkins chronology
Finger Style Guitar (1956)	Chet Atkins at Home (1957)	Hi Fi in Focus (1957)

Chet Atkins at Home is the seventh studio album recorded by American guitarist Chet Atkins. It contains his clever arrangement of Yankee Doodle played at the same time as Dixie.

== Overview ==
Atkins is pictured on the cover in his home studio in Nashville. He was often dissatisfied with his performances in the RCA studios and would take the already recorded rhythm tracks home with him to perfect his guitar part in his own studio.

Chet Atkins at Home became Atkin's first charting album, peaking at No. 21 on the Billboard Best-Selling Pop LPs chart during a four-week stay on it.

An EP with the same title and cover (RCA records #4194) was released including "Say Si Si", "Vilia", "Yankee Doodle Dixie" and "You're Just in Love".

== Reception ==
Professional ratings
Review scores
Source	Rating
Allmusic	4/5 stars

Music critic Richard S. Ginnell, writing for Allmusic, stated that "the record still sounds timeless for its musical beauty and taste, as well as a catholic repertoire that now falls completely outside the boundaries of Nashville country."

== Reissues ==
- Chet Atkins at Home was released as Chet Atkins at Home... Plus with nine bonus tracks on the Universe label in March 2008.

== Track listing ==
=== Side one ===
1. "Say "Si Si"" (Ernesto Lecuona, Francia Luban, Al Stillman)
2. "Vilja" (Franz Lehár)
3. "Sophisticated Lady" (Duke Ellington, Irving Mills, Mitchell Parish)
4. "Ay Ay Ay" (Traditional; arranged by Chet Atkins)
5. "Nagasaki" (Mort Dixon, Harry Warren)
6. "Yankee Doodle Dixie" (Atkins)

=== Side two ===
1. "April in Portugal" (Raúl Ferrão, José Gilhardo, Jimmy Kennedy)
2. "Jungle Drums" (Ernesto Lecuona)
3. "In the Chapel in the Moonlight" (Billy Hill)
4. "Martha" (Traditional; arranged by Chet Atkins)
5. "Czardas" (Vittorio Monti)
6. "You're Just in Love" (Irving Berlin)

Chet Atkins at Home... Plus bonus tracks:

1. "Don't Blame Me"
2. "Muskrat Ramble"
3. "Yankee Doodle Dixie" (EP version)
4. "Asleep in the Deep"
5. "Out of Nowhere"
6. "Even Tho'"
7. "When the Day is Done"
8. ""I'll be with You in Apple Blossom Time"
9. "Swanee River"

== Charts ==
Chart (1958)	Peak position
US Billboard Best-Selling Pop LPs	21

== Personnel ==
- Chet Atkins – guitar
