= Million Dollar Band =

Million Dollar Band may refer to:

- Million Dollar Band (marching band), of the University of Alabama
- Million Dollar Band (country music group), that often performed on the Hee Haw TV variety show 1980–1988
