= Chet Atkins in Hollywood =

- Cover of the original 1959 LP

Studio album by Chet Atkins
- Released: July 1959
- Recorded: October 23, 1958 in Hollywood, CA
- Genre: Country, pop
- Length: 35:47
- Label: RCA Victor LSP-1993
- Producer: Chet Atkins

Chet Atkins chronology
Hi Fi in Focus (1957)	Chet Atkins in Hollywood (1959)	Hum & Strum Along with Chet Atkins (1959)

Alternative Cover
- The 1961 LP re-issue and CD cover of re-issue of Chet Atkins in Hollywood. The photo is the corner of Hollywood Boulevard and Vine Street, Hollywood

Chet Atkins in Hollywood is the ninth studio album recorded by American guitarist Chet Atkins, released in 1959. The title takes its name from the fact that Atkins recorded it in Hollywood. The lush string arrangements are by Dennis Farnon. Atkins later (in 1961) re-recorded this album in his home studio, using the orchestra tapes from the Hollywood session. The original LP lists Atkins as the producer, the 1961 reissue lists "... with Dennis Farnon and his orchestra" and also lists Dick Peirce as producer.

== Reception ==
Professional ratings
Review scores
Source	Rating
Allmusic	4/5 stars

Allmusic music critic Richard S. Ginell specifically praised "Theme from Picnic" and "Jitterbug Waltz" and wrote of the album; "For some, this record might fall under the category of guilty pleasures, but a pleasure it is, one of the great make-out records of its time."

== Track listing ==
=== Side one ===
1. "Armen's Theme" (Ross Bagdasarian) – 2:12
2. "Let It Be Me" (Gilbert Bécaud, Mann Curtis, Pierre Delanoë) – 3:22
3. "Theme from Picnic" (George Duning) – 3:24
4. "Theme from a Dream" (Boudleaux Bryant) – 3:58
5. "Estrellita" (Manuel Ponce) – 2:51
6. "Jitterbug Waltz" (Richard Maltby, Fats Waller) – 3:00

=== Side two ===
1. "Little Old Lady" (Stanley Adams, Hoagy Carmichael) – 2:20
2. "Terry Theme from Limelight" (Charlie Chaplin, Geoffrey Parsons) – 3:16
3. "The Three Bells" (Bert Reisfeld, Jean Villard) – 3:06
4. "Santa Lucia" (Don Titman) – 2:50
5. "Greensleeves" (Traditional) – 3:05
6. "Meet Mister Callaghan" (Eric Spear) – 2:23

== Personnel ==
- Chet Atkins – guitar
- Jethro Burns – mandolin
- Clifford Hils – bass
- Howard Roberts – guitar
- George Callender – bass
- Jim Carney – drums
- Dennis Farnon – orchestrations
- Sam Albert – violin
- Leonard Atkins – violin
- Israel Baker – violin
- Jacques Gasselin – violin
- James Getzoff – violin
- Murray Kellner – violin
- Carl LaMagna – violin
- Marvin Limonick – violin
- Alfred Lustgarten – violin
- Amerigo Marino – violin
- Eudice Shapiro – violin
- Jack Shulman – violin
- Henry Sugar – violin
- Robert Sushel – violin
- Gerald Vinci – violin
- Victor Gottlieb – cello
- Edgar Lustgarten – cello
- Virginia Majewski – viola
- Joseph DiFiore – viola
- Milton Thomas – viola
- Kathyrine Julye – harp
- John Cave – horn
