= Chet Atkins in Three Dimensions =

Studio album by Chet Atkins
- Released: 1955
- Recorded: October 1955 in Nashville, TN
- Genre: Country, pop, classical
- Length: 26:25
- Label: RCA Victor LPM-1197 (Mono)
- Producer: Steve Sholes

Chet Atkins chronology
Stringin' Along with Chet Atkins (LP version) (1955)	Chet Atkins in Three Dimensions (1955)	Finger Style Guitar (1956)

Alternative Cover

Chet Atkins in Three Dimensions is the fifth studio album recorded by American guitarist Chet Atkins. The recording mixes unique arrangements of traditional tunes, pop songs, and classical arrangements (hence the three dimensions of the title). Atkins stated in his 1974 autobiography that this album was the first time he strayed away from country, even though he had been fired numerous times from various radio shows for "not sounding country enough".

A 7-inch EP (EPA-687) was released with the same title in 1956. The tracks were listed as "Minuet and Prelude No. 2", "Intermezzo", "Schon Rosmarin", "Minute Waltz"

== Reception ==
Professional ratings
Review scores
Source	Rating
Allmusic	4/5 stars

In his review for Allmusic, critic Richard S. Ginell wrote Atkins "... tries to transcend categories and stereotypes, dividing the album into three distinct sections... An all-encompassing record like this was the envy of every open-minded guitarslinger of the time."

== Reissues ==
- Chet Atkins in Three Dimensions was later packaged with Mister Guitar and released on CD in 1998 by One Way Records.

== Track listing ==
=== Side one ===
1. "Arkansas Traveler" (Roy Lanham) – 2:18
2. "Londonderry Air" (Traditional; arranged by Chet Atkins) - 3:05
3. "Ochi Chornya (Dark Eyes)" (Traditional; arranged by Chet Atkins) – 2:41
4. "La Golondrina" (Traditional; arranged by Chet Atkins) – 2:42
5. "Blues in the Night" (Harold Arlen, Johnny Mercer) – 2:23
6. "Tenderly" (Walter Gross, Jack Lawrence) – 3:20

=== Side two ===
1. "Little Rock Getaway" (Carl Sigman, Joe Sullivan) – 2:10
2. "Tiptoe Through the Tulips With Me" (Joe Burke, Al Dubin) – 2:18
3. "Johann Sebastian Bach Medley" (J.S. Bach) – 2:25
4. "Intermezzo" (Robert Henning, Heinz Provost) – 2:29
5. "Schön Rosmarin" (Fritz Kreisler) – 1:57
6. "Minute Waltz" (Frédéric Chopin) – 1:42

== Personnel ==
- Chet Atkins – guitar
- Jerry Byrd – guitar
- Ray Edenton – guitar
- Ernie Newton – bass
- Marvin Hughes – piano
- Buddy Harman – drums
