= On the Rebound =

Single by Floyd Cramer

from the album On the Rebound
- A-side: "On the Rebound"
- B-side: "Mood Indigo"
- Released: 1961
- Genre: Nashville Sound
- Length: 2:05
- Label: RCA Victor
- Songwriter(s): Floyd Cramer
- Producer(s): Chet Atkins

Floyd Cramer singles chronology
"Last Date" (1960)	"On the Rebound" (1961)	"San Antonio Rose" (1961)

"On the Rebound" is a 1961 instrumental by pianist Floyd Cramer. In contrast to most of Cramer's work, which consisted mostly of countrypolitan ballads, "On the Rebound" was an uptempo rock and roll instrumental. It made No. 4 in the US and No. 1 in the UK.

== In popular culture ==
- "On the Rebound" was later featured during the opening credits of the 2009 Oscar-nominated film An Education, which was set in England in 1961.
