= Mister Guitar =

- The original LP album cover

Studio album by Chet Atkins
- Released: October 1959
- Recorded: Nashville, TN
- Genre: Country, pop
- Length: 24:43
- Label: RCA Victor LSP-2103 (Stereo)
- Producer: Chet Atkins

Chet Atkins chronology
Hum & Strum Along with Chet Atkins (1959)	Mister Guitar (1959)	After the Riot at Newport (1960)

Alternative Cover
- The LP re-issue of Mister Guitar

Professional ratings
Review scores
Source	Rating
Allmusic	(4.5/5)

Mister Guitar is the eleventh studio album recorded by guitarist Chet Atkins, released in 1959. That title, as well as "Country Gentleman", became names assigned to Chet.

"Country Gentleman", co-written with Boudleaux Bryant, was a minor hit for Atkins in 1953. That original version was recorded in a garage. The liner notes are by David Halberstam, then writing for The Tennessean in Nashville, Tennessee.

== Reissues ==
- Mister Guitar was packaged with Chet Atkins in Three Dimensions and released on CD in 1998 by One Way Records.
- In 2002, Mister Guitar was reissued with Chet Atkins' Workshop by Classic Compact Disc (Disc 2103).

== Track listing ==
=== Side one ===
1. "I Know That You Know" (Anne Caldwell, Vincent Youmans) – 1:53
2. "Rainbow" (Alfred Bryan, Percy Wenrich) – 2:27
3. "Hello Bluebird" (Cliff Friend) – 2:06
4. "Siesta" (Atkins, James Rich) – 2:10
5. "Country Style" (Johnny Burke, Jimmy Van Heusen) – 2:02
6. "Show Me the Way to Go Home" (James Campbell, Reginald Connelly) – 2:06

=== Side two ===
1. "I'm Forever Blowing Bubbles" (John Kellette, James Kendis, James Brockman, Nat Vincent) – 1:30
2. "Backwoods" (James Rich) – 2:09
3. "Country Gentleman" (Atkins, Boudleaux Bryant) – 1:53
4. "Slinkey" (Atkins) – 1:59
5. "Jessie" (Traditional) – 1:44
6. "Piano Concerto in B-Flat Minor" (Pyotr Ilyich Tchaikovsky) – 2:27

== Personnel ==
- Chet Atkins – guitar

== Production notes ==
- Engineered by Bob Farris and Bill Porter
