= Last Date (song) =

1960 single by Floyd Cramer

- Italian release picture sleeve

Single by Floyd Cramer

from the album Last Date
- B-side: "Sweetie Baby"
- Released: August 1960
- Recorded: July 12, 1960
- Studio: RCA Victor, Nashville, Tennessee
- Genre: Country
- Length: 2:26
- Label: RCA Victor
- Songwriter: Floyd Cramer
- Producer: Chet Atkins

Floyd Cramer singles chronology
""Flip Flop and Bop"" (1960)	"Last Date" (1960)	""On the Rebound"" (1961)

"Last Date" is a 1960 instrumental written and performed by Floyd Cramer. It exemplifies the "slip note" style of piano playing that Cramer made popular. It peaked at number 11 on the country chart and at number two on the Hot 100 behind "Are You Lonesome Tonight?" by Elvis Presley. Cramer's recording inspired a number of successful cover versions, including a vocal adaptation by Conway Twitty.

== Charts ==
Chart performance for "Last Date"
Chart (1960)	Peak position
Australia (Kent Music Report)	8
Canada CHUM Hit Parade	4
New Zealand "Lever Hit Parade"	1
US Billboard Hot 100	2

== Cover versions ==
- In 1960, Lawrence Welk's orchestra recorded an instrumental version of the song for an album of the same title; the piano-dominated arrangement stuck very closely to Cramer's original version. Welk's version spent 11 weeks on the Billboard Hot 100 chart, peaking at No. 21.
- In 1960 Skeeter Davis recorded the song, with lyrics written by her and Boudleaux Bryant, titled "My Last Date (with You)". The song reached No. 26 on the Billboard Hot 100 and No. 4 on Billboard's "Hot C&W Sides" chart.
- Also in 1960, the Davis lyric version was successfully released as a single by Joni James, charting at #38 on the Billboard' Hot 100, and as an album track by several artists including Ann-Margret and Pat Boone.
- In 1961 the Ventures covered the song in their distinct surf-guitar style, on their Dolton album Another Smash!!!.
- Ace Cannon recorded a version for his 1963 album Moanin' Sax.
- In 1963 Duane Eddy recorded a version of the song, along with Floyd Cramer, when Eddy joined the RCA label.
- The Spotnicks recorded the song, also in 1963, and it was issued as a single. The song appeared later on the band's Greatest Hits album.
- In 1964 Al Hirt released a version on his album, Cotton Candy.
- In 1967 the Soul Runners released a version of the song as a single which did not chart.
- In 1968 Zal Yanovsky of the group The Lovin' Spoonful released a version on his solo album Alive & Well in Argentina.
- In 1972 Conway Twitty recorded the song, with new lyrics written by him, and was known as "(Lost Her Love) On Our Last Date" and was his seventh solo number one on the US Country Chart. It spent one week at number one and a total of 13 weeks on the chart.
- In 1975 the song was covered by British reggae singer T.T. Ross in 1975 on a single, produced by Dennis Harris, for the Lucky record label, and also issued on Polydor Records.
- In 1982 Emmylou Harris recorded the Conway Twitty version as "(Lost His Love) On Our Last Date" which was her fifth number one on the country chart as a solo artist.
- In 1987 R.E.M. recorded an instrumental version of the Skeeter Davis version for the B-side of their single "It's the End of the World as We Know It (And I Feel Fine)". They recorded a vocal version of it with Debbie Harry for her album Debravation in 1993 using the same arrangement.
- American R&B and boogie-woogie pianist and singer Little Willie Littlefield recorded a version for his 1994 album Yellow Boogie & Blues.
- In 2013 the David Bromberg Band recorded a studio version of "Last Date" which had been a regular part of their live repertoire. The song appears on the album Only Slightly Mad.
- In 2014 Ezra Lee recorded his version on the album, Motor Head Baby.
- On April 8, 2024, St. Louis Musician, Paul Neihaus IV, released a single version.
