= The Nashville A-Team =

Group of American musicians

The Nashville A-Team was a nickname given to an original group of highly skilled session musicians active in Nashville recording studios—particularly RCA Studio B and the Quonset Hut—from the late 1950s through the 1960s. The group did not have a fixed roster; it was a rotating circle of about twelve or thirteen first-call players who appeared on a large share of commercial recordings out of Nashville and were central to the creation of the Nashville Sound. Though hired independently, they worked together on sessions nearly every day. Record producers favored them for their dependability to learn new material quickly, play it flawlessly, and avoid overplaying so as to showcase the vocalist. Most of them were in demand to the extent that they worked sessions around the clock, having little time for their families during their peak years. Core members typically included rhythm-section players: guitar, piano, bass, and drums, being supplemented by specialty instrumentalists and vocal groups as required by specific sessions. They backed dozens of popular singers, including Elvis Presley, Eddy Arnold, Patsy Cline, Jim Reeves, Bob Dylan, Jerry Lee Lewis, Brenda Lee, and others.

== The original core group ==
In 2007, The Nashville A-Team was inducted as a group into the Musicians Hall of Fame and Museum in Nashville. The inductees included Harold Bradley, Floyd Cramer, Pete Drake, Ray Edenton, Hank Garland, Buddy Harman, Tommy Jackson, Grady Martin, Charlie McCoy, Bob Moore, Boots Randolph, Hargus "Pig" Robbins, and Jerry Kennedy.

== Contribution to the "Nashville Sound" ==
In the 1960s and 1970s, the development of the Nashville Sound occurred largely in parallel at the competing Bradley studios and RCA, located just a few blocks apart.

Early country music in the U.S. was tied to rural, working-class America and was called "Hillbilly". It was influenced by Hawaiian music in the 1940s, which explained the steel guitar's prominence. Bluegrass, Honky Tonk, Western Swing, and Rockabilly contributed to the genre's evolution. In the 1960s, another major cultural change came along: rock 'n’ roll.

Country music producers realized that three-chord country songs featuring steel guitars and fiddles were not selling as well as artists such as Roy Orbison and The Everly Brothers, who demonstrated a different sound and drew a broader audience. In response, producers Owen Bradley, Harold Bradley, and Chet Atkins adopted a more polished production style, replacing fiddle and steel in favor of string arrangements, piano, and background vocals. The resulting sound, shaped by the A-Team, proved commercially successful and helped sustain the industry during a period of transition. Examples of the Nashville Sound include Jim Reeves' "Four Walls" with Bob Moore, Chet Atkins, Floyd Cramer, and the Jordanaires; The Everly Brothers' "Bye Bye Love", with Chet Atkins, Buddy Harman, and Lightnin' Chance; and Patsy Cline's "Crazy", a song that included six Nashville A–Team members.

In later years, the original A–Team gradually evolved. An example is when pianist Floyd Cramer's solo success took him in another direction; the void was filled by Hargus "Pig" Robbins. New generations of young session musicians came along. Because the A-Team designation was never formally constituted, the transition occurred without a clearly defined boundary.

== Defining the A-team members by generations ==
Music writer Travis Stimeling published his opinion of who constitutes the Nashville A-Team over 35 years, and grouped them into four generations from 1945 to 1980:

- First generation (c. 1945–c. 1955),
- Second (c. 1955–c. 1963),
- Third (c. 1963–c. 1975), and
- Fourth (c. 1967–c. 1980).

=== Guitar ===
- Chet Atkins (first generation)
- Harold Bradley (first generation)
- Billy Byrd (first generation)
- Hank Garland (second generation)
- Grady Martin (second generation)
- Velma Smith (second generation)
- Fred Carter Jr. (third generation)
- Ray Edenton (third generation)
- Wayne Moss (third generation)
- Jerry Reed (third generation)
- Reggie Young (fourth generation)

=== Piano ===
- Owen Bradley (first generation)
- Floyd Cramer (second generation)
- Hargus "Pig" Robbins (third generation)
- David Briggs (fourth generation)

=== Bass ===
- Joe Zinkan (first generation)
- Bob Moore (second generation)
- Henry Strzelecki (third generation)
- Norbert Putnam (fourth generation)

=== Drums ===
- Farris Coursey (first generation)
- Buddy Harman (second generation)
- Jerry Carrigan (fourth generation)

=== Harmonica and other instruments ===
- Charlie McCoy (third generation)

=== Background vocals ===
- The Jordanaires (second generation)
- The Anita Kerr Singers (second generation)

== Other members ==
Stimeling's list represents his opinion, but other musicians have been associated as "The Nashville A-Team" including:

- Bassists: Ernie Newton, Henry Strzelecki, Roy Madison `Junior' Huskey, Floyd "Lightnin' " Chance, Joe Osborn
- Drummers: Farris Coursey, Doug Kirkham, Larrie Londin (1970s), Kenny Buttrey, Farrell Morris
- Keyboardists:Bill Pursell, Steve Nathan
- Guitarists: Grady Martin, Hank Garland, Velma Williams Smith, Paul Yandell, Pete Wade, Norman Blake, Jimmy Capps, Spider Wilson, Fred Carter Jr., Billy Sanford, Joe South, Wayne Moss, Jimmy Colvard, Chip Young
- Fiddle: Johnny Gimble, Buddy Spicher, Dale Potter, Vassar Clements, Brenton Banks
- Steel guitar: Pete Drake, Jerry Byrd, Buddy Emmons, Ralph Mooney, Lloyd Green, Shot Jackson, Maurice Anderson, Hal Rugg, Weldon Myrick, Little Roy Wiggins, Walter Haynes
- Banjo: Earl Scruggs, Buck Trent, Sonny Osborne, Bobby Thompson
- Mandolin: Jethro Burns
- Harmonica: Jimmy Riddle
- Harp: Mary Alice Hoepfinger
- Backing singers: The Anita Kerr Singers, The Nashville Edition

Although primarily associated with country music, many members of the Nashville A-Team worked in jazz and pop music. Albums associated with A–Team musicians include After the Riot at Newport by the Nashville All-Stars and Chet Atkins, Velvet Guitar by Hank Garland, Modern Country by Kai Winding, Tennessee Firebird by Gary Burton, and Chester and Lester by Chet Atkins and Les Paul. The progressive country band Area Code 615 was composed almost entirely of members of the Nashville A-Team.

== Similar groups in other cities ==
Similar situations developed in other music centers where small studio players created the sounds fans grew to identify with singers or bands. Across the 1960s recording industry, other studio-based groups came to define the sound of their regions. In Muscle Shoals, the Swampers anchored Southern soul recordings; In Detroit the Funk Brothers provided the foundation for Motown’s output; and in Los Angeles the Wrecking Crew dominated West Coast pop sessions. Together, these loosely organized but highly consistent groups played a central role in defining the sound of popular music during the period.

== See also ==
- Booker T. & the M.G.'s
- The Funk Brothers
- The Memphis Boys
- MFSB
- Muscle Shoals Rhythm Section
- Salsoul Orchestra
- The Section
