= Old Dominion Barn Dance =

Country radio show

Old Dominion Barn Dance is an American country music radio show broadcast over WRVA, Richmond, Virginia each Saturday night. Mary Workman, better known as "Sunshine Sue" was the host (1946–1957). Gregg Kimball of the Library of Virginia said of the program, "It was unique because it featured a female host and gained a national audience through syndication on CBS radio."

In 1957, Carlton Haney began the New Dominion Barn Dance, which WRVA broadcast until 1964.

The music and humor show was broadcast live on radio in over 38 states and Canada and were transmitted to military personnel overseas via recordings on the Armed Forces Radio Service. The broadcasts originated at the Lyric Theater (later renamed the WRVA Theater) on North 9th Street and East Broad Street. The theater was filled to capacity every Saturday night, with lines that wrapped around the block. Two shows broadcast, one at 7:30pm and the other at 9:30pm, nationwide and introduced America to Country Music. This show was attended by all ages and classes.

A big fan of the Old Dominion Barn Dance, Virginia Governor William "Bill" Munford Tuck (1946–1950) had a private box reserved for him where he would frequently attend the show on Saturday nights.

The Lyric Theater was built in 1913 and demolished in 1963.

The show also toured at times. The June 7, 1947, issue of The Free Lance–Star in Fredericksburg, Virginia, carried an advertisement promoting the appearance of "20 Radio Stars," the "entire cast" of the Old Dominion Barn Dance for two shows at James Monroe High School on June 9, 1947.

In 1973, an effort was made to revive the Old Dominion Barn Dance, but it was unsuccessful. After almost 5,000 people attended the initial performance, attendance dropped to 900 for the second show and went even lower the third week. An article in Billboard magazine's April 7, 1973, issue quoted a spokesman for the show as saying "We can't understand what happened, and we're trying to evaluate the situation, but people just stopped coming after that first show." The program was broadcast on WTVR.

Beginning in 2015, Donna Meade Dean (the widow of Jimmy Dean) brought back the Old Dominion Barn Dance for four performances in the Henrico Theater in Highland Springs, Virginia. Marty Stuart headlined the first show on February 21, 2015.

== Performers ==
- Mel Hughes
- Bernie Wright
- John Eagles
- Lefty Baker
- Bing Colonori
- Paul Craft
- Charlie Pritchard
- Bent Mountain Boys
- Virginia Travelers
- Rusty Adams
- Barbara Allen
- Suzi Arden
- Bobby Atkins
- Red Battle
- Ray Berry
- Brennen Twins
- Ivan V Yonce Jr.
- Slim Bryant
- Carter Family (Mother Maybelle, Helen, Anita and June)
- Steve Chapman
- Stoney Cooper
- Wilma Lee Cooper
- Jerry Cope
- Sonny Dae & his Radio Raskals
- Buster Puffenbarger
- Jim Eanes
- Tony Edwards
- Crazy Elmer
- Lester Flatt
- Donna Gay
- Harold Hensley
- Shirley Hunter
- Jolly Joe
- Grandpa Jones
- Judy, Jen, and George
- Benny Kissinger
- Knight Sisters
- Rose Lee
- Lonnie Lynne
- Joe Maphis
- Janis Martin
- Clyde Moody
- Abbe Neal
- Zag Pennell
- Jackie Phelps
- Chief Powhatan
- Prairie Songbirds
- Don Reno
- Rock Creek Rangers
- Roy Russell
- The Saddle Sweethearts
- Hank Satterwhite
- Earl Scruggs
- Allen Shelton
- Mary Slaughter
- Slim Idaho
- Red Smiley
- Quincy Snodgrass
- Connie Stewart
- Joe Stone
- Toby Stroud
- Sunshine Sue
- Arnold Terry
- Tuttle Sisters
- Virginia Mountain Boys
- Arlene Wilshire
- Jim Wilson
- Craig Wingfield
- George Winn
- Mac Wiseman
- Jean Wright
