= Sonny Dae and His Knights =

Sonny Dae and His Knights was an American vocal and instrumental group in the early 1950s. The group was the first to record the hit song "Rock Around the Clock".

The group comprised Italian-American singer Sonny Dae (born Paschall Salvatore Vennitti, May 24, 1928–February 1987), pianist Hal Hogan, guitarist Art Buono, and Mark Bennett, bassist, and/or drummer. It was a novelty group that billed itself as "instrumental, vocal and fun makers", and had a regular slot on the Old Dominion Barn Dance radio show in Richmond, Virginia.

"Rock Around the Clock" was authored by Max C. Freedman and James E. Myers and was performed in stage shows in 1953 by Myers's friend and associate Bill Haley. Jimmy De Knight, (born James E. Myers), a music publisher and a songwriter who co-wrote 10 other songs with Freedman, had a songwriting partnership with Freedman. They agreed to publish and copyright the song in 1953 as a joint composition. Myers tailored the song for Bill Haley, for whom he had written songs and had become the music publisher for under Myers Music. Haley's record company, however, Essex Records, initially refused to allow him to record it, because the company's owner, Dave Miller, detested Myers and refused to allow his songs to be released on the label. Instead, Myers' business partner, Jack Howard, offered the song to Sonny Dae and His Knights, who recorded and released it (take 6 was the released version) in Philadelphia on 20 March 1954 (recorded, according to some other sources, late in 1953 or as late as March 1954). "(We're Gonna) Rock Around The Clock To-night!" was copyrighted on 31 March 1953 in the U.S. Library Of Congress.

The recording was released on Howard's Arcade label (label number 123) and reviewed by Billboard in the R&B section. But the record achieved only modest local success. The B-side was an instrumental with accompanying vocals, "Moving Guitar", written by S. Dae, A. Buono and M. Bennett. Bill Haley & The Comets then recorded their version of "Rock Around the Clock" on 12 April 1954, which became a worldwide hit.

Sonny Dae & His Knights is not known to have made any other recordings.
