= Million Dollar Band (country music group) =

US musical group

The Million Dollar Band was an all-star group of session musicians that often performed on the Hee Haw television variety show from August 1980 through November 1988.

The group's members included some of Nashville's most well-known virtuosos at their respective instruments: Chet Atkins, Boots Randolph, Floyd Cramer, Charlie McCoy, Danny Davis, Jethro Burns and Johnny Gimble, along with Hee Haw co-host Roy Clark. Many of them, at one time or another, were members of The Nashville A-Team, the list of session musicians responsible for creating the famous Nashville Sound. Of the group's eight members, only McCoy (the youngest of the group) is still alive as of 2022.

Its name made reference to the 1956 jam-session Sun Records impromptu group known as "The Million Dollar Quartet", which included Elvis Presley, Jerry Lee Lewis, Johnny Cash and Carl Perkins. Although it primarily played instrumental country music, the Million Dollar Band's jam sessions often included influence from jazz, blues, easy listening and other styles that reflected the diverse interests and instruments of the various musicians involved in the project.

== Instrumentation ==
- Lead guitar: Chet Atkins
- Rhythm guitar: Roy Clark
- Mandolin: Jethro Burns
- Fiddle: Johnny Gimble
- Saxophone: Boots Randolph
- Piano: Floyd Cramer
- Harmonica: Charlie McCoy
- Trumpet: Danny Davis

== Performance dates ==
The group performed on the following 27 Hee Haw episodes:

Hee Haw season 13

- Episode 287, 08-13-1980
- Episode 290, 10-04-1980
- Episode 293, 10-25-1980
- Episode 296, 10-18-1980
- Episode 299, 12-06-1980
- Episode 303, 01-17-1981
- Episode 309, 02-28-1981
- Episode 312, 03-21-1981

Hee Haw season 14

- Episode 314, 09-19-1981
- Episode 317, 10-10-1981
- Episode 320, 10-31-1981
- Episode 326, 10-12-1981
- Episode 330, 01-23-1982

Hee Haw season 15

- Episode 340, 09-18-1982
- Episode 349, 11-20-1982
- Episode 353, 12-18-1982
- Episode 356, 01-22-1983
- Episode 363, 03-12-1983

Hee Haw season 16

- Episode 374, 11-26-1983
- Episode 386, 02-25-1984
- Episode 390, 03-24-1984

Hee Haw season 17

- Episode 391, 09-22-1984
- Episode 396, 10-27-1984
- Episode 402, 12-08-1984
- Episode 406, 01-05-1985

Hee Haw season 18

- Episode 438, 02-15-1986

Hee Haw season 21

- Episode 503, 11-26-1988

== Sources ==
- tviv.org tviv.org episode schedule
- tvguide.com episode list
