= Last Date (Lawrence Welk album) =

Studio album by Lawrence Welk and His Orchestra
- Released: 1960
- Genre: Easy listening
- Label: Dot

Last Date is an album by Lawrence Welk and His Orchestra. It was released in 1960 on the Dot label (catalog no. DLP-25350).

The album debuted on Billboard magazine's popular albums chart on December 19, 1960, reached the No. 4 spot, and remained on that chart for 18 weeks

AllMusic gave the album a rating of four-and-a-half stars. Reviewer Greg Adams called it "a program of piano-based pop instrumentals that rank among Welk's best work of the '60s."

== Track listing ==
Side 1

1. "Last Date" (Floyd Cramer) [2:19]
2. "Sleep" (Earl Lebieg) [2:20]
3. "To Each His Own" (Livingston, Evans) [2:29]
4. "The Green Leaves of Summer" (Theme From "The Alamo") (Tiompkin, Webster) [2:22]
5. "Temptation" (Freed, Brown) [2:06]
6. "Georgia on My Mind" (Carmichael, Gorrell) [2:26]

Side 2

1. "Please Help Me, I'm Falling" (Robertson, Blair) [2:24]
2. "Chances Are" (Stillman, Allen) [2:17]
3. "Melodie D'Amour" (Salvador, Johns) [2:23]
4. "Night Theme" (Peterson, Cogswell) [2:24]
5. "My Heart Has a Mind of Its Own" (Greenfield, Keller) [2:32]
6. "Misty" (Erroll Garner) [2:11]
