= Max C. Freedman =

American songwriter (1893–1962)

Max Charles Freedman
- Born: January 8, 1893; Philadelphia, Pennsylvania, U.S.
- Died: October 8, 1962 (aged 69)
- Other name: Ray Freedman
- Occupations: Songwriter, lyricist

Max Charles Freedman (né Friedman; January 8, 1893 – October 8, 1962) was an American songwriter and lyricist, best remembered for co-writing the song "Rock Around the Clock".

== Background ==
Freedman was born in Philadelphia, and became a radio announcer, writer and entertainer, before joining the staff of a music publishing company. Recordings of songs he wrote and co-wrote date back as early as 1919. He joined ASCAP in 1942. One of his first successes as a writer, credited as Ray Freedman, was "Sioux City Sue", a hit record for the song's co-writer Dick Thomas in 1945, and later recorded by many others including Gene Autry, Bing Crosby, Bob Wills and Willie Nelson. His other successful songs, several of which were written with Morty Berk and Frank Capano, included "Dreamy Old New England Moon", "Heartbreaker" (1947), and "Tea Leaves" (1948).

Freedman is credited as co-writer of the landmark song "Rock Around the Clock" with "Jimmy DeKnight", a pseudonym used by music publisher and promoter James E. Myers. The song was copyrighted on March 31, 1953, although there is evidence that it was written in 1952. There are also claims that Freedman wrote the song in its entirety. Myers himself confirmed this during a legal deposition in the late 1950s.

Although Bill Haley & His Comets were supposed to be the first to record it, a dispute between Myers and Dave Miller, the owner of Essex Records, prevented Haley from doing so. The first recording of the song was made by an Italian-American novelty group, Sonny Dae & His Knights, on March 20, 1954 only a few weeks before Haley finally recorded it on April 12, 1954 for Decca Records and in 1955, the song became a no. 1 record, one of the first of the rock and roll era.

Freedman died in 1962 at the age of 69.

== Sources ==
- Dawson, Jim. Rock Around the Clock: The Record that Started the Rock Revolution. Backbeat Books, 2005. ISBN 978-0879308292
- John Swenson. Bill Haley. London: W.H. Allen, 1982. ISBN 978-0491029476
- Haley, John W. and John von Hoelle. Sound and Glory. Dyne-American, 1990. ISBN 978-1878970015
