= Richard Weize =

German businessman and author (1945–2026)

- Born: 4 August 1945; Bad Gandersheim, Free State of Brunswick, Allied-occupied Germany
- Died: 13 November 2026 (aged 81)
- Occupations: Businessman, author

Richard Weize (4 August 1945 – 13 November 2026) was a German businessman who was the founder of Bear Family Records label, operator of the Richard Weize Archives, and an author. Weize and his work have been featured in the Los Angeles Times, Rolling Stone Die Zeit, Welt, Die Presse, Der Standard, and more.

== Education ==
Weize grew up in Bad Gandersheim. His family has been working in the bookbinding trade since 1845, as well as running a book and stationery shop. His passion for pop music emerged when the first Anglo-American 45-rpm records appeared in Germany in the 1950s, and it was fueled by American Forces Network, Elvis Presley and the Star-Club in Hamburg. By 1960, Weize had become a pioneering record trader, importing hard-to-get country and rock ‘n’ roll albums from the US and selling them – with a small surcharge – to his friends. Not only was this the start of his own record collection, but also one of the foundation stones of his Bear Family Records business.

== Bear Family Records ==
Weize founded Bear Family Records in 1975. The label was such a grassroots operation at first that Weize began by typing the label's first "catalogues" on his typewriter, but soon he had to employ some staff to help him with his work. By then Bear Family had changed from a mail order business to a record label selling their own re-releases worldwide. In building the company, Weize had found many companions – producers, authors, musicians, music lovers – some of whom continue to contribute to the label's releases. Among them: Jürgen Brückner, John Cowley, Hank Davis, Colin Escott, Bill Geerhart, Martin Hawkins, Hugo Keesing, Michael Kleff, Volker Kühn, Rainer E. Lotz, Bernd Matheja, Ted Olson, Tony Russel, Dr. Jürgen Schebera.

== Further activities ==
Weize retired in 2015, but continued to compile records for Bear Family Records. In addition, he was on the board of the Klaus Kuhnke Archives and continued to release recordings on the "and more bears" label. He published two books, 1000 Nadelstiche (Amerikaner & Briten singen deutsch 1955-1975—1000 Needlesticks (Americans and British sing in the German language 1955–1975) and Creole Music of the French West Indies – a discography 1900-1959, and co-written LONDON Label Lexikon, and contributed a foreword to The TELDEC Story.

== Personal life and death ==
Weize had five children from his first two marriages to Helga and Petra Weize: Ricky (born 1964), Rene (born 1965), Tobias (born 1972), Sarah (born 1974) and Philipp (born 1979). From 1994, Weize lived with his third wife, Birgit, in Vollersode near Bremen.

Weize died on 13 November 2026, at the age of 81.

== Awards ==
Richard Weize was honored with numerous awards, including the "W.C. Handy Award," the "Blues Music Award," and several Bear Family albums have been nominated for Grammys in the U.S. He also received a special award by the Association of German Music Critics in 2003 for his life's work, and in 2009 the German music industry honored his achievements by granting an Echo award to Bear Family for "outstanding contributions to music."

On 2 February 2021, Weize was awarded the Cross of the Order of Merit – on proposal of Germany's Federal President Frank-Walter Steinmeier – for his life's work. He has devoted his life to the preservation and accessibility of musical cultural assets, or as stated by Götz Alsmann in his written eulogy: "Richard Weize's work is one big recovery of cultural treasures, purely and simply the preservation of the world’s musical heritage." According to Alsmann, Weize's work in the field of musical history is by all means comparable to that of Ludwig von Köchel or Otto Erich Deutsch, whose directories are fundamental contributions to the cataloging and preservation of Mozart's and Schubert's music.
