= James E. Myers =

American songwriter (1919–2001)

James Edward Myers
- Born: October 26, 1919; Philadelphia, Pennsylvania, U.S.
- Died: May 10, 2001 (aged 81); Bonita Springs, Florida, U.S.
- Other name: Jimmy DeKnight
- Occupations: Songwriter; music publisher; actor; director; producer; raconteur

James Edward Myers (October 26, 1919 – May 10, 2001) was an American songwriter, music publisher, actor, director, producer, and raconteur.

Myers is best known as the credited co-writer of "Rock Around the Clock" for which he used the pseudonym "Jimmy DeKnight". Myers is credited as co-writer, with Max C. Freedman, though doubt has been cast as to whether Myers actually participated in the writing of the song.

== Biography ==
Myers came from a musical family in Philadelphia. His father played drums and his mother played piano. Myers became a drummer. He formed his first band when he was fourteen called Jimmy Myers and The Truckadeers Orchestra. He later formed a band called Jimmy DeKnight and His Knights of Rhythm for which he composed the song "Things That You Say".

He served in the Pacific during World War II. He returned to Philadelphia after the war where he joined up with Jack Howard to form Cowboy Records. He first met Bill Haley at the WPWA record station pitching records to the radio host in Chester, Pennsylvania.

The song "Rock Around the Clock" was published in early 1953 by his publishing company Myers Music in Philadelphia. Myers first pitched the song to Bill Haley. Although Bill Haley & His Comets were supposed to be the first to record it, a dispute between Myers and Dave Miller, Haley's producer for Essex Records prevented Haley from doing so (though Haley later claimed he tried several times to record it at Essex). Myers was convinced, however, that the song would be a hit. He organized the recording of the song on Arcade Records. The first recording of the song was made by an Italian-American band, Sonny Dae & His Knights. It was released as a 45 single but failed to chart. Haley finally recorded it in April 1954 for Decca Records and in 1955, following its popular use in the opening credits of the film Blackboard Jungle, the song became the first No. 1 record of the Rock and Roll era.

Myers' songwriting career dated back to the 1940s, and his DeKnight moniker appears on several country and western recordings made by Haley in the 1949-51 era. He co-wrote with Tom Gindhart and copyrighted the song "Ten Gallon Stetson (With a Hole in the Crown)" in 1948, a song which Bill Haley recorded on Keystone Records and released in 1950. "Ten Gallon Stetson" was the first release by Bill Haley and the Saddlemen, a group which would evolve into Bill Haley with Haley's Comets and Bill Haley and His Comets.

Myers formed Myers Music in Philadelphia to publish songs, and oversaw many of his own compositions as well as a number of Haley originals such as "Rock-a-Beatin' Boogie". It is also believed that Myers played drums on an early recording by Haley's pre-Comets group, the Saddlemen, though this has yet to be definitively confirmed. A later claim by Myers (cited in John Swenson's biography Bill Haley: The Daddy of Rock and Roll) that he played drums on "Rock Around the Clock" has been disproven by the existence of an official recording session document indicating the drummer was Billy Gussak.

The relationship between Myers and Haley collapsed in 1955-56 when Myers began providing songs to The Jodimars, a group made up of former Comets. Myers co-wrote the song "Rattle My Bones" with Jesse Stone (who, under the name Charles Calhoun, wrote the lyrically similar "Shake, Rattle and Roll") for The Jodimars in 1956, which was released as the B side of a single on Capitol Records.

He recorded his own instrumental versions of "Rock Around the Clock" in 1959 as Jimmy DeKnight and His Knights of Rhythm, which were released as a 45 single on several record labels, Apt, Peak, President in the UK, and Arzee in 1979. One version was the song arranged in the cha cha format as "Rock Around the Clock Cha Cha". Although credited to DeKnight, it is not known what instruments, if any, Myers played on these recordings.

== Composition of "Rock Around the Clock" ==
He described the composition of the seminal song "Rock Around the Clock". He stated that the melody was developing and evolving for several years before he wrote it down on paper. He was playing the tune on a piano in his office when his friend composer Max C. Freedman joined in.

"When we finished it he said, `What are you going to call it?' I said, 'Rock Around The Clock,"' Myers said in an interview with the Rockabilly Hall of Fame in Burns, Tenn.

"And he said, `Why rock? What's that mean? Why not "Dance Around The Clock?"' And I said, 'I just have a gut feeling and since I'm half writer and whole publisher, I'm the boss! Right!' So, we called it 'Rock Around The Clock.'"

Myers co-wrote a series of songs with Freedman, among which were "The Covered Wagon Goes Roll, Roll, Rollin'", "The Sun Came Through", "A Bucket Full of Tears", "Make Believe Island", "Adalita", "Let Me Know", "The Password", "Can You Spare a Moment (For the Lord)", and "A Bushel of Sunbeams" and "You're a Long Time Dead" which were also copyrighted in 1953 and published by Myers Music and Standard Songs respectively.

== Film roles ==
In later years, Myers turned to acting, appearing in small roles in a number of films such as The China Syndrome; he also directed at least two films under his Jimmy DeKnight pen name. He also wrote an autobiography based upon his experiences in World War II entitled Hell in a Foxhole (Vantage Press, 1966), and opened a museum in his home dedicated to "Rock Around the Clock".

== Death ==
Myers died in Bonita Springs, Florida, on May 10, 2001, at the age of 81.

== Filmography ==
- Uncle Scam (1981)
- Shaft in Africa (1973)
- Refinements in Love (1971)
- Caught in the Can (1970)
- Deep Love (1970)
- Homer... The Late Comer (1970)
- Ride, Mister? (1970)
- The Hang Up (1969)
- The Divorcee (1969)
- The Fabulous Bastard from Chicago (1969)
- Lady Godiva Rides (1969)
- Mrs. Brown, You've Got a Lovely Daughter (1968)
- The Block (1964)
