= Bear Family Records =

German record label

- Founded: 1975
- Founder: Richard Weize
- Genre: Various
- Country of origin: Germany
- Location: 27729 Holste-Oldendorf
- Official website: www.bear-family.de

Bear Family Records is a Germany-based independent record label that specializes in reissues of archival material, specialising primarily in country music, but varying in everything from 1950s rock and roll to vintage German movie soundtracks.

== History ==
The label has been in existence since 1975, founded by collector Richard Weize, starting with the double LP Going Back to Dixie by Bill Clifton. It has become known for its extravagant (and expensive) box sets. The company describes itself as "a collector's record label" due to its primary business, which is reissuing rare recordings in CD format in small amounts.

== Artists ==
Among the many artists who have been the subject of extensive box set releases by Bear Family are Bob Wills, Merle Haggard, Waylon Jennings, David Allan Coe, Hank Snow, Jim Reeves, Johnny Cash, Willie Nelson, Dean Martin, Bill Haley & His Comets, the Kingston Trio, Louis Jordan, The Everly Brothers, Chet Atkins, Ann-Margret, Pat Boone, Frankie Laine, Petula Clark, Burl Ives, the Carter Family, Fats Domino, Rosemary Clooney, Doris Day, Connie Francis, Lesley Gore, Ricky Nelson, Nat King Cole, Gene Autry, Johnny Sea, Joe Dowell, the Treniers, Porter Wagoner, Dolly Parton, Jerry Lee Lewis, The Vipers Skiffle Group, Merle Travis and Weldon Rogers.

Bear Family has also made a habit of producing thorough compilations of artists with a more limited fanbase, such as two separate five-CD Johnnie Ray collections, a five-CD box set of Merle Travis, six-CD box sets of Slim Whitman and the Orioles, a seven-CD Rod McKuen set, eight-CD collections of Lonnie Donegan, Del Shannon, Neil Sedaka and Gene Vincent, a nine-CD omnibus of Johnny Burnette, a 16-CD omnibus of Jim Reeves, and a series of five boxed sets with a total of 26 CDs covering Doris Day's complete recording history for Columbia Records.

== Compilations ==
The company has also released several hundred 'various artists' compilations, organized by theme or genre. These include such eclectic projects as a 10-CD political protest song box set, an 11-CD set of the Jewish and Yiddish performers of the mid-1930s, a seven-CD box featuring 195 different versions of the song "Lili Marleen", compilations of music based on and from the TV series Bonanza, a four-CD collection of British music hall songs of the early 20th century, a 10-CD set of late-1930s calypso music, a 52-CD "History of Pop Music" set and a 26-CD compilation detailing the country hit parade from 1945 to 1970.

In 1996, Bear Family released a 16-CD compilation titled Welcome to My World by Jim Reeves, including more than 75 unissued titles and many demo recordings.

== See also ==
- Bear Family Records albums
- List of record labels
