= Sunshine Sue =

American musician and radio host

Mary Workman (born Mary Arlene Higdon, November 12, 1912 – June 13, 1979), better known by the stage name Sunshine Sue, was an American country music singer best known for her work on the Old Dominion Barn Dance radio program. Her obituary, distributed by the Associated Press, noted that she was "the first woman radio show emcee in the country."

== Early years ==
The daughter of Mr. and Mrs. Grant Higdon, Workman was born in Keosauqua, Iowa.

== Career ==
She and her husband formed a country music duo that entertained on small Iowan radio stations. They gained more attention by appearing on the National Barn Dance broadcast on radio station WLS in Chicago, which was where she gained the name Sunshine Sue. In 1937, she went to WHAS radio in Louisville, Kentucky, performing with her Rock Creek Rangers on the daily Early Morning Jamboree and on the weekly Kentucky Play Party.

Workman went to WRVA in Richmond, Virginia, in 1940, having the five-days-a-week Sunshine Sue & Her Rangers program that began as a local show and later was carried by approximately 40 other stations via the Mutual Broadcasting System. Later, she became known for her work on the Old Dominion Barn Dance, which was broadcast nationally on CBS radio and internationally on Armed Forces Radio. Besides the network broadcast, the program was carried daily on WRVA. She served as MC of the program in addition to singing and playing guitar and organ.

Off the air, she oversaw the Old Dominion Barn Dance's financial affairs and hired talent in her role as the head of Southland Shows, Inc. (SSI). The scope of the company grew beyond the Barn Dance as it brought to Richmond Gene Autry, Tex Ritter, and other stars in addition to touring shows that included Annie Get Your Gun, Hollywood on Ice, and Oklahoma!

Formation of SSI shifted control of the program from WRVA to the company. SSI—primarily Workman—selected entertainers, "signed them to exclusive contracts, polished their acts, directed them, and sold them as a package to the WRVA barn-dance show." That exclusivity eventually led to the departure of Mother Maybelle and the Carter Sisters from WRVA. For 18 months, the Carters had worked under a non-exclusive contract with WRVA, performing in other venues when they didn't have a commitment on the station. In 1948, they resigned from the station rather than be brought under a new, exclusive contract.

To accommodate the Old Dominion Barn Dance, WRVA rented the 1,300-seat Lyric Theatre in Richmond, with the highest tickets selling for 95 cents. By 1953, in-person attendance for broadcasts had totaled more than 700,000. Workman attributed the popularity of her music to the contrast of its style with problems in the world. In a newspaper story distributed by United Press in 1953, she said:

There's a lot of conflict and confusion in the world these days, as anyone can testify. Our kind of music is so simple, soothing, reassuring and direct that people just naturally seem to need it to give them peace of mind.

Workman's fans included William M. Tuck, Virginia's governor from 1946 to 1950. He reserved a private box for each Saturday night performance, often using it to entertain visiting dignitaries. He also issued an official proclamation designating Sunshine Sue "Queen of the Hillbillies".

In 1953, Workman had a 5-minute Sunshine Sue afternoon program on CBS radio. She also performed in the Broadway show Hayride (1954). In the late 1950s, she had a program, Sunshine Sue and Her Rangers, on WRVA-TV in Richmond.

In 1963, Workman retired after having a heart attack.

== Personal life ==
On May 11, 1930, she married John Workman in Fairfield, Iowa. They had a son, Bill, and a daughter, Ginger, and they remained wed until her death.

== Death ==
On June 13, 1979, Workman died in a hospital in Richmond, Virginia, following complications resulting from a series of strokes. She was 66.

== Recognition ==
Workman was a 1972-1973 honorary inductee of the Virginia Country Music Hall of Fame.
