= Boots Randolph =

American saxophonist (1927–2007)

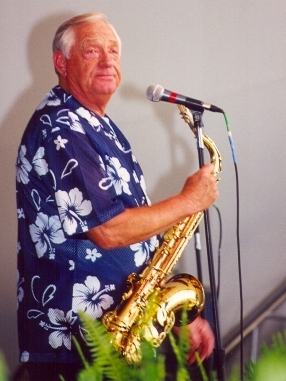
- Randolph in March 2000

Background information
- Also known as: "Boots"
- Born: Homer Louis Randolph III; June 3, 1927; Paducah, Kentucky, U.S.
- Died: July 3, 2007 (aged 80) Nashville, Tennessee, U.S.
- Genre: Nashville sound
- Occupation: Saxophonist
- Instrument: Saxophone
- Labels: RCA Victor, Capitol, Monument
- Website: bootsrandolph.com

Homer Louis "Boots" Randolph III (June 3, 1927 – July 3, 2007) was an American musician. His 1963 saxophone hit "Yakety Sax" became the signature tune of The Benny Hill Show. Randolph was a prolific session musician and member of the Nashville A-Team, performing on numerous recordings by artists including Chet Atkins, Elvis Presley, Roy Orbison, Brenda Lee, REO Speedwagon, and Al Hirt. He performed alongside artists in pop, rock, jazz, and country music.

== Biography ==
Randolph was born in Paducah, Kentucky, on June 3, 1927. and raised in Cadiz, Kentucky. He said a brother gave him the nickname "Boots" to avoid confusion, since his father and he had the same first name, though the reason for the nickname choice is unknown.

As a child, Randolph learned to play music with his family's band, who entered talent shows to win food to help get by during the Great Depression. He started out playing the ukulele and trombone, but switched to tenor saxophone when his father unexpectedly brought one home.

Randolph graduated from Central High School in Evansville, Indiana, and served in the United States Army toward the end of World War II, playing saxophone, trombone, and vibraphone in the U.S. Army Band until his discharge in 1946.

After his service in the Army, he played with Dink Welch's Kopy Kats in Decatur, Illinois, from 1948 to 1954. He briefly resided in Louisville, Kentucky, before returning to Decatur to start his own group. Early in his career, he often billed himself as Randy Randolph. In 1957, he left Decatur and relocated to the Nashville, Tennessee, suburb of Hendersonville and was signed to RCA Victor by Chet Atkins in 1958. While Randolph's initial recordings for the label were not commercial successes, they recognized his potential as a session musician, and Randolph became part of the Nashville A-Team. He played on Brenda Lee's 1958 hit "Rockin' Around the Christmas Tree", Al Hirt's 1963 instrumental hit "Java", Roy Orbison's 1964 hit "Oh, Pretty Woman", and Johnny Cash's 1965 cover hit of "Orange Blossom Special". He played on many recording sessions with Elvis Presley and also performed on soundtracks for a number of Presley's motion pictures, one popular song being "Return to Sender". He was also present on many recordings by guitarist Chet Atkins, with whom he often performed.

In 1961, he signed with Monument Records and as a solo recording artist placed four singles in the top 100 between 1963 and 1967. The most successful of these was "Yakety Sax", which reached number 35 in 1963 and stayed on the charts for nine weeks. Randolph was also successful on Billboard's album charts, having 14 entries between 1963 and 1972. Boots With Strings from 1966 reached number 36 and stayed on the chart for nearly two years.

Randolph often maintained a schedule of over 200 recording and performance commitments annually. He also appeared on numerous television shows. including The Ed Sullivan Show, The Tonight Show Starring Johnny Carson, and The Jimmy Dean Show. In the 1980s, he also frequently appeared on the television program Hee Haw as a member of the Million Dollar Band.

In 1977, Randolph opened and performed regularly at Boots Randolph's, a 275-seat nightclub in downtown Nashville's Printer's Alley, which remained in operation until 1994.

== Personal life and death ==
Randolph married Dee Baker in 1948; they had a son, Randy, and a daughter, Linda. On July 3, 2007, Randolph died at Skyline Medical Center in Nashville, after suffering a brain hemorrhage. He had celebrated his 80th birthday just one month prior.

His final solo studio album, A Whole New Ballgame, was released on June 12, 2007.

== Discography ==
=== Albums ===
Year	Title	Chart positions
Year	Title	US
1960	Boots Randolph's Yakety Sax	79
1963	Yakety Sax!	—
1964	Hip Boots!	—
1964	The Yakin' Sax Man	—
1965	Boots Randolph Plays More Yakety Sax!	118
1965	Plays 12 Monstrous Sax Hits!	—
1965	Sweet Talk	—
1966	Boots with Strings^{A}	36
1966	The Fantastic Boots Randolph	—
1967	Boots Randolph with the Knightsbridge Strings & Voices	189
1967	King of Yakety	—
1968	Sunday Sax	76
1968	The Sound of Boots	60
1969	...With Love/The Seductive Sax of Boots Randolph	82
1969	Boots and Stockings	16
1969	Yakety Revisited	113
1970	Hit Boots 1970	157
1970	Boots with Brass	168
1971	Homer Louis Randolph, III	141
1972	Boots Randolph Plays the Hits of Today	192
1973	Sentimental Journey	—
1974	Country Boots^{B}	—
1975	Cool Boots	—
1976	Party Boots	—
1977	Sax Appeal	—
1978	Boots Randolph Puts a Little Sax in Your Life	—
1982	Dedication	—
1983	Yakety-Madness (featuring Richie Cole)	—
1990	Boots	—
1992	Boots Live	—
1992	Christmas at Boots' Place (featuring Tommy Newsom's Jazztet)	—
2000	Songs for the Spirit	—
2002	A Christmas Holiday	—
2007	A Whole New Ballgame	—

- ^{A} Boots with Strings also peaked at number three on Jazz albums and number 21 on R&B albums
- ^{B} Country Boots peaked at number 30 on Country albums

=== Singles ===
Year	Title	Chart positions	
Year	Title	US	US AC
1963	"Yakety Sax"	35	—
1964	"Hey, Mr. Sax Man"	77	—
1966	"The Shadow of Your Smile"	93	28
	"Miss You"		
	"Yodelin' Sax"		
1967	"Temptation"	93	30
1967	"Big Daddy"	105	—
1968	"Fred"	—	39
1968	"Gentle on My Mind"	—	19
1969	"Hey Jude"		
	"Down Yonder"		
1970	"Anna"	111	40
	"Those Were the Days"		
	"Sunday Mornin' Comin' Down"		

== See also ==
- The Nashville A-Team
