= Floyd Cramer =

American pianist (1933–1997)

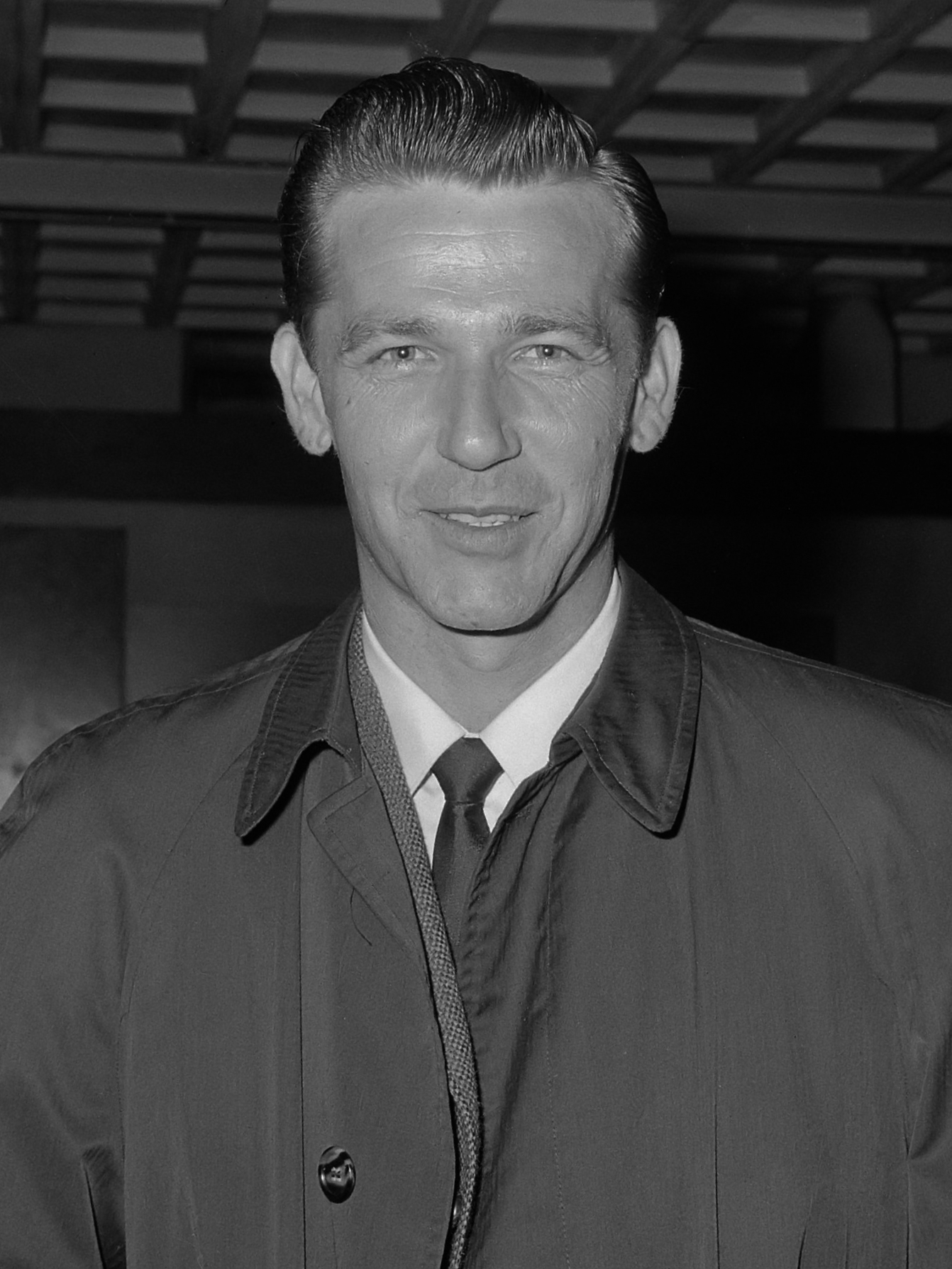
- Cramer in 1965

Background information
- Born: Floyd Cramer; October 27, 1933; Shreveport, Louisiana, U.S.
- Origin: Huttig, Arkansas, U.S.
- Died: December 31, 1997 (aged 64) Nashville, Tennessee
- Genres: Country, Nashville sound
- Occupation: Pianist
- Instrument: Piano
- Years active: 1953−1980
- Label: Abbott

Floyd Cramer (October 27, 1933 – December 31, 1997) was an American pianist who became famous for his use of melodic "whole-step" attacks. He was inducted into both the Country Music Hall of Fame and the Rock and Roll Hall of Fame. His signature playing style was a cornerstone of the pop-oriented "Nashville sound" of the 1950s and 1960s. Cramer's "slip-note" or "bent-note" style, in which a passing note slides almost instantly into or away from a chordal note, influenced a generation of pianists. His sound became popular to the degree that he stepped out of his role as a sideman and began touring as a solo act. In 1960, his piano instrumental solo, "Last Date" went to number two on the Billboard Hot 100 pop music chart and sold over one million copies. Its follow-up, "On the Rebound", topped the UK Singles Chart in 1961. As a studio musician, he became one of a cadre of elite players dubbed the Nashville A-Team and he performed on scores of hit records.

A pianist demonstrating Floyd Cramer's "bent-note" piano style

== Biography ==
Cramer was born in Shreveport, Louisiana, and grew up in the small town of Huttig, Arkansas. He taught himself to play the piano. After finishing high school, he returned to Shreveport, where he worked as a ragtime pianist for the radio show Louisiana Hayride, with a banjo-bass-and-drums combo. His earliest recordings, on the Abbott label, carry the credit "Featuring Floyd Cramer on the Piano with Louisiana Hayride Band".

After Elvis Presley performed on Louisiana Hayride in 1955, he hired his own band which included Cramer, Jimmy Day, Scotty Moore, Bill Black, and D. J. Fontana. This group remained his supporting band for much of that year; however, when Presley asked them to relocate to Hollywood, Cramer and Day declined to follow him there, preferring to remain in Nashville to pursue independent careers as studio musicians. In Nashville, Cramer found that piano accompaniment in country music was growing in popularity. By the next year he was, in his words, "in day and night doing session". Before long, he was one of the busiest studio musicians in the industry, playing piano for stars such as Elvis Presley, Brenda Lee, Patsy Cline, the Browns, Jim Reeves, Eddy Arnold, Roy Orbison, Don Gibson, and the Everly Brothers, among others. It was Cramer's piano playing, for instance, on Presley's first RCA Victor single, "Heartbreak Hotel". While Cramer was well-established as a session player, he had a long career as a solo performer with dozens of his own albums and singles, including some Top 40 instrumental hits.

Cramer had released records under his own name since the early 1950s and became well known following the release of "Last Date", a 45-rpm single, released by RCA Victor in 1960. The instrumental piece exhibited a relatively new concept in piano playing known as the "slip note" style. The record went to number two on the Billboard Hot 100 pop music chart, sold over one million copies, and was awarded a gold disc. The song was kept out of the number one position by Elvis Presley's "Are You Lonesome Tonight?" The session pianist for Presley's recording, in an early morning session (about 4:00 AM) at RCA Studio B in Nashville, was Cramer himself.

Trying to launch myself on a solo career, after being Elvis Presley's pianist for so long, placed me in an unenviable position. Some people thought I was trying to cash in. If I had wanted to cash in on my association with Elvis, I would have done it five years ago.

— NME - November 1961

In 1961, Cramer had a hit with "On the Rebound", which went to number 4, and number 1 on the UK Singles Chart. ("On the Rebound" was featured during the opening credits of the 2009 Oscar-nominated film An Education, which was set in England in 1961.) Also in 1961, Cramer had a hit with "San Antonio Rose" (number 8).

By the mid-1960s, Cramer had become a respected performer, making numerous albums and touring with guitar maestro Chet Atkins and saxophonist Boots Randolph, sometimes headlining and sometimes as the opening act for Eddy Arnold. Cramer also performed with them as a member of the Million Dollar Band.

Cramer died of lung cancer on New Year's Eve, 1997, at the age of 64. He was interred in the Spring Hill Cemetery in the Nashville suburb of Madison, Tennessee.

== Legacy ==
Cramer’s grandson, Jason Coleman, followed in his footsteps taking up the piano, performing with him on television and in concert at a young age. At age 17, he played "Please Help Me, I'm Falling", the first song to feature Cramer's signature slip notes, with Hank Locklin at the Grand Ole Opry, and two years later played piano for the Medallion Ceremony at Cramer's induction into the Country Music Hall of Fame. He carries on his grandfather's legacy with recordings and a touring tribute concert, The Piano Magic of Floyd Cramer, sharing the piano arrangements and story of Cramer's contributions to American music.

== Awards ==
In 2003, Cramer was inducted into the Country Music Hall of Fame and the Rock and Roll Hall of Fame. In 2004, his recording of "Last Date" was inducted into the Grammy Hall of Fame, established to honor recordings of lasting qualitative or historical significance. In 2008, Cramer was inducted into the Louisiana Music Hall of Fame.

East Tennessee State University, in Johnson City, Tennessee, offers the Floyd Cramer Competitive Scholarship.

== Discography ==
=== Albums ===
Year	Album	Chart Positions		Label
Year	Album	US Country	US	Label
1957	That Honky Tonk Piano	—	—	MGM Records
1960	Hello Blues	—	—	RCA Victor
1961	Last Date	—	—	RCA Victor
1961	On the Rebound	—	70	RCA Victor
1962	America's Biggest Selling Pianist	—	—	RCA Victor
1962	Floyd Cramer Gets Organ-ized	—	113	RCA Victor
1962	I Remember Hank Williams	—	130	RCA Victor
1963	Swing Along with Floyd Cramer	—	—	RCA Victor
1963	Comin' On	—	—	RCA Victor
1963	Three Great Pianos (with Peter Nero and Frankie Carle)	—	—	RCA Victor
1964	Country Piano-City Strings	—	—	RCA Victor
1964	Cramer at the Console	—	—	RCA Victor
1964	The Best of Floyd Cramer	—	—	RCA Victor
1965	Hits from the Country Hall of Fame	10	—	RCA Victor
1965	Class of '65	—	107	RCA Victor
1965	The Magic Touch of Floyd Cramer	—	—	RCA Victor
1966	The Distinctive Piano Style of Floyd Cramer	—	—	RCA Victor
1966	Only the Big Ones	—	—	RCA Victor
1966	Class of '66	—	123	RCA Victor
1967	Night Train	—	—	RCA Victor
1967	Here's What's Happening!	20	166	RCA Victor
1967	Floyd Cramer Plays the Monkees	—	—	RCA Victor
1967	Class of '67	21	—	RCA Victor
1967	We Wish You a Merry Christmas	—	26	RCA Victor
1968	Floyd Cramer Plays Country Classics	16	—	RCA Victor
1968	Class of '68	—	—	RCA Victor
1968	Floyd Cramer Plays MacArthur Park	36	—	RCA Victor
1968	The Best of Floyd Cramer Volume 2	—	—	RCA Victor
1969	Class of '69	31	—	RCA Victor
1969	Floyd Cramer Plays More Country Classics	17	—	RCA Victor
1970	The Big Ones, Vol. 2	—	183	RCA Victor
1970	With the Music City Pops	—	—	RCA Victor
1970	This Is Floyd Cramer	39	—	RCA Victor
1970	Class of '70	43	—	RCA Victor
1971	Almost Persuaded	—	—	RCA Victor
1971	Chet, Floyd & Boots (with Chet Atkins and Boots Randolph)	—	—	RCA Victor
1971	Sounds of Sunday	44	—	RCA Victor
1971	Class of '71	34	—	RCA Victor
1972	Detours	—	—	RCA Victor
1972	Class of '72	—	—	RCA Victor
1972	Best of the Class of Floyd Cramer	—	—	RCA Victor
1972	Date with Floyd Cramer	—	—	RCA Victor
1973	Floyd Cramer Plays the Big Hits	—	—	RCA Victor
1973	Super Country Hits	—	—	RCA Victor
1973	Class of '73	34	—	RCA Victor
1974	The Young and the Restless	—	—	RCA Victor
1974	Spotlight On	—	—	RCA Victor
1974	Floyd Cramer in Concert	25	—	RCA Victor
1975	Piano Masterpieces 1900–1975	—	—	RCA Victor
1975	Class of '74 and '75	—	—	RCA Victor
1976	Floyd Cramer Country	46	—	RCA Victor
1977	Floyd Cramer & the Keyboard Kick Band	50	—	RCA Victor
1977	Chet, Floyd & Danny (with Chet Atkins and Danny Davis)	46	—	RCA Victor
1978	Looking for Mr. Goodbar	—	—	RCA Victor
1979	Super Hits	—	—	RCA Victor
1980	Dallas	29	170	RCA Victor
1981	Great Country Hits	—	—	RCA Victor
1981	The Best of the West	—	—	RCA Victor
1982	20 of the Best	—	—	RCA Victor
1985	Collector's Date	—	—	RCA Victor
1985	Country Classics	—	—	
1988	Special Songs of Love	—	—	Step One Records
1988	Country Gold	—	—	Step One Records
1988	Just Me and My Piano	—	—	Step One Records
1989	Forever Floyd Cramer	—	—	Step One Records
1989	We Wish You a Merry Christmas	—	—	Step One Records
1989	Originals	—	—	Step One Records
1991	Gospel Classics	—	—	Step One Records
1994	The Piano Magic of Floyd Cramer	—	—	Ranwood
1995	Favorite Country Hits 1	—	—	Ranwood
1996	The Piano Magic of Floyd Cramer 2	—	—	Ranwood
1997	Blue Skies	—	—	Ranwood
1997	Favorite Country Hits 2	—	—	Ranwood

=== Singles ===
Year	Single	Chart Positions					Album
Year	Single	US	US Country	US R&B	US AC	UK	Album
1953	"Fancy Pants"		—	—	—	—	
1958	"Flip Flop and Bop"	87	—	—	—	—	Last Date
1960	"Last Date"	2	11	3	—	—	Last Date
1961	"On the Rebound"	4	—	16	—	1	On the Rebound
1961	"San Antonio Rose"	8	8	—	3	36	On the Rebound
1961	"Your Last Goodbye"	63	—	—	—	—	America's Biggest Selling Pianist
1961	"Hang On"	95	—	—	—	—	America's Biggest Selling Pianist
1962	"Chattanooga Choo Choo"	36	—	—	9	—	(single only)
1962	"Let's Go"	90	—	—	—	—	Floyd Cramer Gets Organ-ized
1962	"Lovesick Blues"	87	—	—	20	—	I Remember Hank Williams
1962	"Hot Pepper"	63	—	—	—	46	(singles only)
1962	"Swing Low"	110	—	—	—	—	(singles only)
1962	"Losers Weepers"	127	—	—	—	—	(singles only)
1963	"Java"	49	—	—	12	—	Swing Along with Floyd Cramer
1963	"(These Are) The Young Years"	129	—	—	—	—	Comin' On
1963	"How High the Moon"	121	—	—	—	—	(single only)
1963	"Heartless Heart"	124	—	—	—	—	Country Piano-City Strings
1967	"Stood Up"	—	53	—	24	—	(single only)
1968	"By the Time I Get to Phoenix"	—	—	—	32	—	
1970	"Theme from 222"	—	—	—	39	—	
1977	"Rhythm of the Rain"	—	67	—	—	—	Floyd Cramer & the Keyboard Kick Band
1980	"Dallas"^{A}	104	32	—	34	—	Dallas

- ^{A}"Dallas", a cover version of the theme to the popular TV series, peaked at number 8 on the RPM Country Tracks chart in Canada.

== See also ==
- The Nashville A-Team
- Both Sides, Now
- Games People Play (Joe South song)

== Other sources ==
- Escott, Colin (1998), "Floyd Cramer". In Paul Kingsbury (ed.), The Encyclopedia of Country Music, New York: Oxford University Press., pp. 117–18.
