= Billboard year-end top 50 country & western singles of 1961 =

Billboard top 20 country and western singles of 1961

This is a list of Billboard magazine's ranking of the year's top country and western singles of 1961.

Patsy Cline's "I Fall to Pieces" ranked as the year's No. 1 country and western record. It was released in January 1961, entered the Top 40 on Billboard's country and western chart on April 3, and spent a total of 39 weeks on the chart.

George Jones had two records that finished in the year's Top 5 records: "The Window Up Above" spent 34 weeks on the chart and ranked No. 3 on the year-end chart; and "Tender Years" spent 32 weeks on the chart and ranked No. 4 for the year.

Webb Pierce and Buck Owens led all other artists, each having four records on the year-end list.

Three labels, Capitol, Decca, and RCA Victor, each had 11 records finish on the year-end list. Columbia had seven, and Mercury five.

| Rank | Peak (Note: This column recites the record's peak position on Billboard's weekly charts.) | Title | Artist(s) | Label |
|---|---|---|---|---|
| 1 | 1 | "I Fall to Pieces" | Patsy Cline | Decca |
| 2 | 2 | "Foolin' Around" | Buck Owens | Capitol |
| 3 | 2 | "The Window Up Above" | George Jones | Mercury |
| 4 | 1 | "Tender Years" | George Jones | Mercury |
| 5 | 2 | "Three Hearts in a Tangle" | Roy Drusky | Decca |
| 6 | 1 | "Hello Walls" | Faron Young | Capitol |
| 7 | 1 | "Don't Worry" | Marty Robbins | Columbia |
| 8 | 1 | "Heartbreak U.S.A." | Kitty Wells | Decca |
| 9 | 2 | "Sea of Heartbreak" | Don Gibson | RCA Victor |
| 10 | 1 | "On the Wings of a Dove" | Ferlin Husky | Capitol |
| 11 | 3 | "Sweet Lips" | Webb Pierce | Decca |
| 12 | 4 | "I'll Just Have Another Cup of Coffee" | Claude Gray | Mercury |
| 13 | 3 | "I Missed Me" | Jim Reeves | RCA Victor |
| 14 | 5 | "Hillbilly Heaven" | Tex Ritter | Capitol |
| 15 | 5 | "Heart over Mind" | Ray Price | Columbia |
| 16 | 2 | "Under the Influence of Love" | Buck Owens | Capitol |
| 17 | 1 | "North to Alaska" | Johnny Horton | Columbia |
| 18 | 1 | "Walk On By" | Leroy Van Dyke | Mercury |
| 19 | 3 | "My Ears Should Burn" | Claude Gray | Mercury |
| 20 | 5 | "Beggar to a King" | Hank Snow | RCA Victor |
| 21 | 5 | "Let Forgiveness In" | Webb Pierce | Decca |
| 22 | 7 | "Loving You (Was Worth This Broken Heart)" | Bob Gallion | Hickory |
| 23 | 7 | "I Think I Know" | Marion Worth | Columbia |
| 24 | 6 | "When Two Worlds Collide" | Roger Miller | RCA Victor |
| 25 | 4 | "The Blizzard" | Jim Reeves | RCA Victor |
| 26 | 4 | "Loose Talk" | Buck Owens, Rose Maddox | Capitol |
| 27 | 7 | "Odds and Ends (Bits and Pieces)" | Warren Smith | Liberty |
| 28 | 4 | "Fallen Angel" | Webb Pierce | Decca |
| 29 | 7 | "Big River, Big Man" | Claude King | Columbia |
| 30 | 10 | "Louisiana Man" | Rusty and Doug | Hickory |
| 31 | 5 | "My Last Date (With You)" | Skeeter Davis | RCA Victor |
| 32 | 6 | "Sweet Dreams" | Don Gibson | RCA Victor |
| 33 | 4 | "You're the Reason" | Bobby Edwards | Crest |
| 34 | 3 | "It's Your World" | Marty Robbins | Columbia |
| 35 | 9 | "Po' Folks" | Bill Anderson | Decca |
| 36 | 9 | "I Went Out of My Way" | Roy Drusky | Decca |
| 37 | 4 | "Hello Fool" | Ralph Emery | Liberty |
| 38 | 9 | "Walk Out Backward" | Bill Anderson | Decca |
| 39 | 10 | "Your Old Love Letters" | Porter Wagoner | RCA Victor |
| 40 | 7 | "Oklahoma Hills" | Hank Thompson | Capitol |
| 41 | 2 | "Excuse Me" | Buck Owens | Capitol |
| 42 | 12 | "I Love You Best of All" | Louvin Brothers | Capitol |
| 43 | 7 | "Happy Birthday to Me" | Hank Locklin | RCA Victor |
| 44 | 5 | "Walking the Streets" | Webb Pierce | Decca |
| 45 | 9 | "Right or Wrong" | Wanda Jackson | Capitol |
| 46 | 1 | "Big Bad John" | Jimmy Dean | Columbia |
| 47 | 8 | "San Antonio Rose" | Floyd Cramer | RCA Victor |
| 48 | 9 | "Three Steps to a Phone (Millions of Miles)" | George Hamilton IV | RCA Victor |
| 49 | 8 | "Backtrack" | Faron Young | Capitol |
| 50 | 10 | "I'd Rather Loan You Out" | Roy Drusky | Decca |

== See also ==
- List of Hot C&W Sides number ones of 1961
- List of Billboard Hot 100 number ones of 1961
- 1961 in country music
