= List of Hot C&W Sides number ones of 1961 =

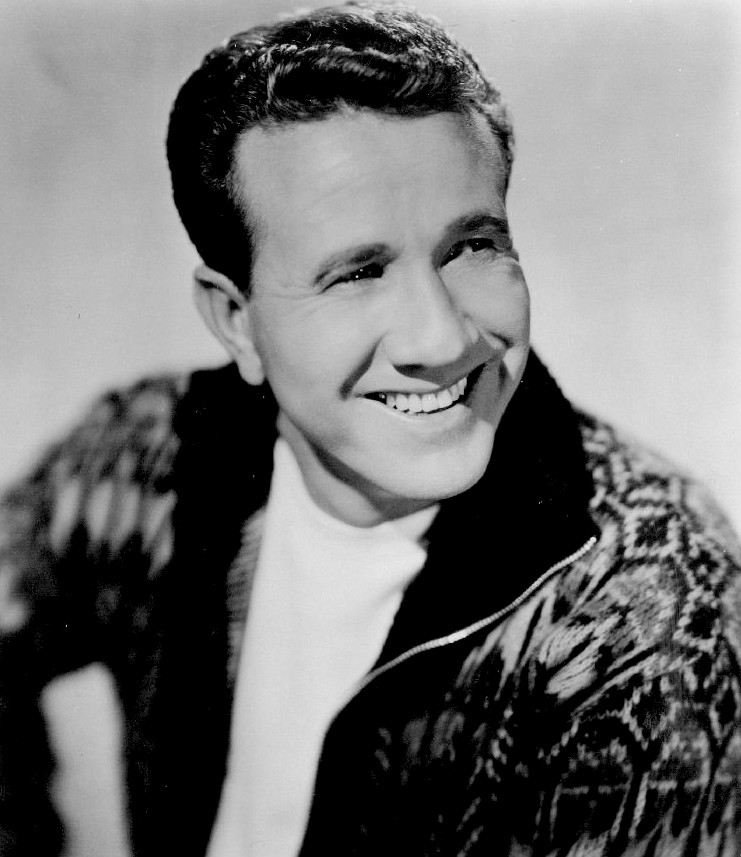
Marty Robbins spent 10 weeks at number one with "Don't Worry".

Hot Country Songs is a chart that ranks the top-performing country music songs in the United States, published by Billboard magazine. In 1961, nine different singles topped the chart, which at the time was published under the title Hot C&W Sides, C&W being an abbreviation for country and western. Chart placings were based on playlists submitted by country music radio stations and sales reports submitted by stores.

Each of the nine number ones during the year was by a different artist. In the first issue of 1961, dated January 9,^{[A]} Johnny Horton reached number one with "North To Alaska", replacing Ferlin Husky's "Wings Of A Dove", the final chart-topper of 1960. Horton's single spent five weeks at number one before Husky's song returned to the top of the chart for two further weeks. "North to Alaska" was a posthumous number one for Horton, who had died in an automobile accident the previous November. Following Husky's spell in the top spot, Marty Robbins had the longest unbroken run at number one of the year, spending ten consecutive weeks atop the chart with "Don't Worry". Immediately after this run, Faron Young had a nine-week spell atop the listing with "Hello Walls", an early songwriting success for Willie Nelson, who would go on to be one of the most successful and celebrated singers in country music history. Despite continuing to chart regularly, Young would not reach number one again until 1972.

The final number one of the year was "Walk On By" by Leroy Van Dyke. The song first reached the top spot in September and by the end of the year had spent ten non-consecutive weeks atop the chart in three separate spells. It would go on to hold the position for a further nine weeks in 1962 for a cumulative total of nineteen weeks at number one. This figure set a record for the most weeks at number one by a song since Billboard combined country music sales and airplay into a single chart in 1958. It would retain the record for more than 50 years, until Florida Georgia Line spent 24 weeks at number one between December 2012 and August 2013 with the song "Cruise". Despite its huge success, "Walk On By" was Van Dyke's first and only number one single. Two other acts gained the first country number one singles of their respective careers in 1961. Patsy Cline spent two weeks at the top with "I Fall To Pieces", the first of two number ones which she would achieve before her death in a plane crash in 1963. Jimmy Dean spent a similar length of time in the peak position with his first number one, "Big Bad John", which also topped the Hot 100, Billboard's pop singles chart. It was the only song to top both charts in 1961.

== Chart history ==
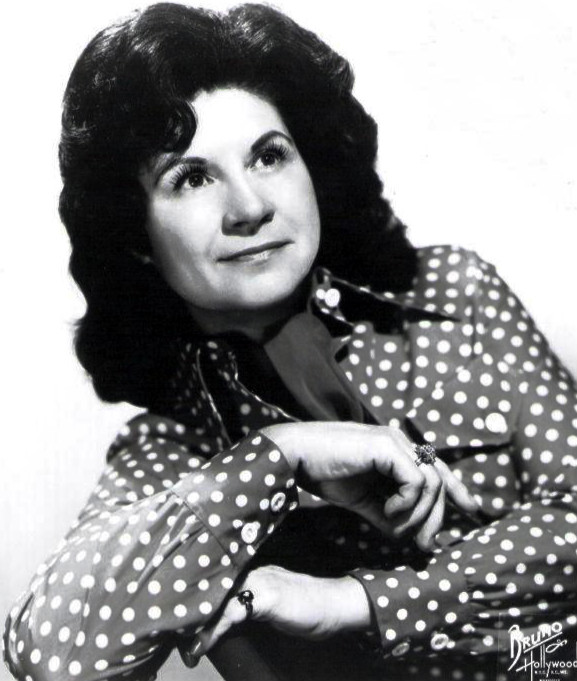
Kitty Wells spent four weeks at number one with "Heartbreak U.S.A."

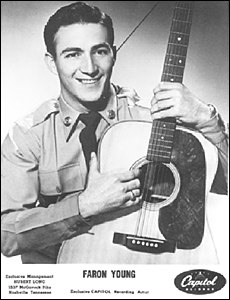
Faron Young had the second-longest unbroken run at number one of 1961, spending nine weeks in the top spot with "Hello Walls".

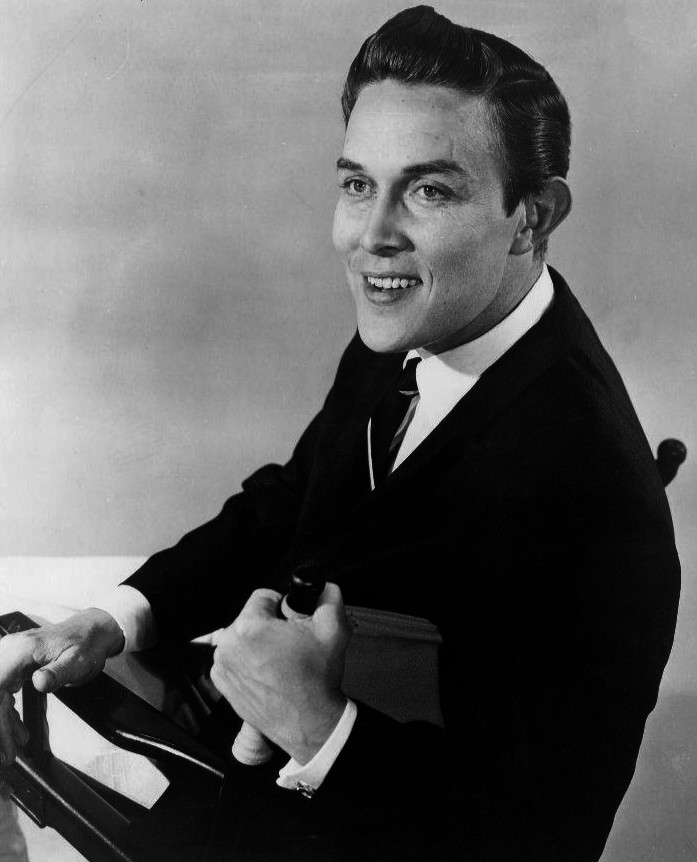
Jimmy Dean's "Big Bad John" had a two-week run at the top.

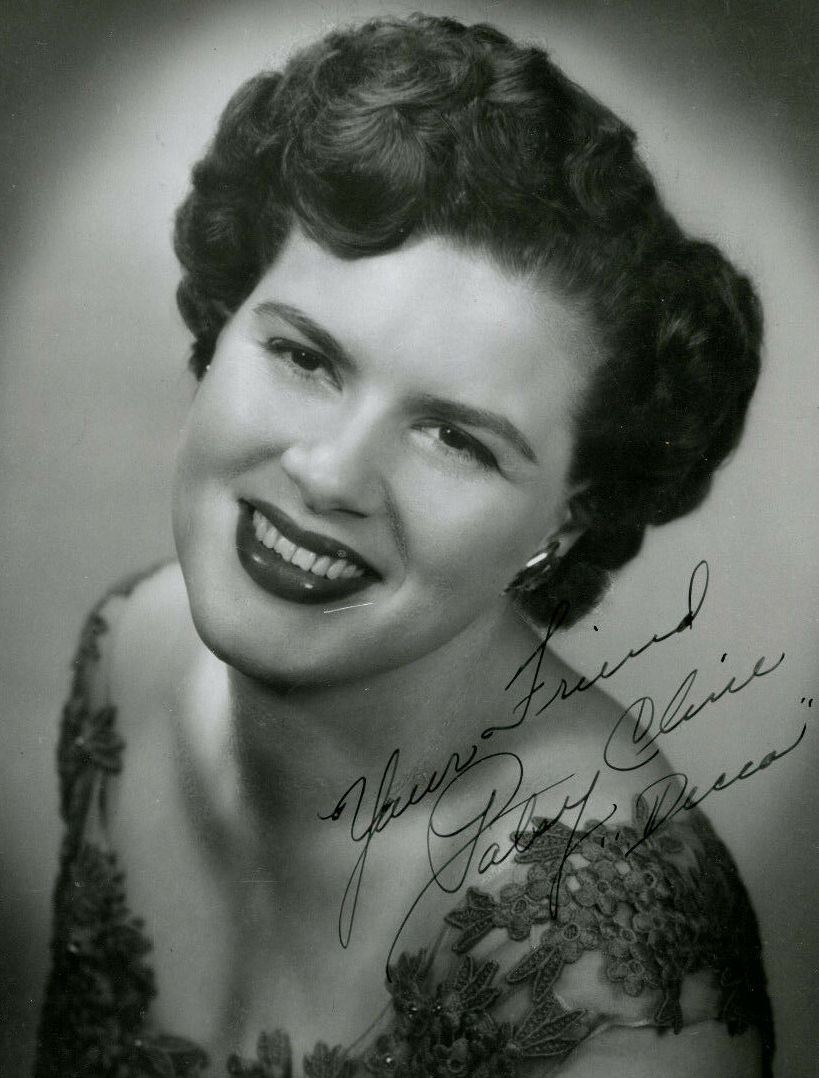
Patsy Cline had her first number one in 1961.

Chart history
Issue date	Title	Artist(s)	Ref.
January 9	"North To Alaska"	Johnny Horton	
January 16	"North To Alaska"	Johnny Horton	
January 23	"North To Alaska"	Johnny Horton	
January 30	"North To Alaska"	Johnny Horton	
February 6	"North To Alaska"	Johnny Horton	
February 13	"Wings Of A Dove"	Ferlin Husky	
February 20	"Wings Of A Dove"	Ferlin Husky	
February 27	"Don't Worry"	Marty Robbins	
March 6	"Don't Worry"	Marty Robbins	
March 13	"Don't Worry"	Marty Robbins	
March 20	"Don't Worry"	Marty Robbins	
March 27	"Don't Worry"	Marty Robbins	
April 3	"Don't Worry"	Marty Robbins	
April 10	"Don't Worry"	Marty Robbins	
April 17	"Don't Worry"	Marty Robbins	
April 24	"Don't Worry"	Marty Robbins	
May 1	"Don't Worry"	Marty Robbins	
May 8	"Hello Walls"	Faron Young	
May 15	"Hello Walls"	Faron Young	
May 22	"Hello Walls"	Faron Young	
May 29	"Hello Walls"	Faron Young	
June 5	"Hello Walls"	Faron Young	
June 12	"Hello Walls"	Faron Young	
June 19	"Hello Walls"	Faron Young	
June 26	"Hello Walls"	Faron Young	
July 3	"Hello Walls"	Faron Young	
July 10	"Heartbreak U.S.A."	Kitty Wells	
July 17	"Heartbreak U.S.A."	Kitty Wells	
July 24	"Heartbreak U.S.A."	Kitty Wells	
July 31	"Heartbreak U.S.A."	Kitty Wells	
August 7	"I Fall To Pieces"	Patsy Cline	
August 14	"I Fall To Pieces"	Patsy Cline	
August 21	"Tender Years"	George Jones	
August 28	"Tender Years"	George Jones	
September 4	"Tender Years"	George Jones	
September 11	"Tender Years"	George Jones	
September 18	"Tender Years"	George Jones	
September 25	"Walk On By"	Leroy Van Dyke	
October 2	"Tender Years"	George Jones	
October 9	"Tender Years"	George Jones	
October 16	"Walk On By"	Leroy Van Dyke	
October 23	"Walk On By"	Leroy Van Dyke	
October 30	"Walk On By"	Leroy Van Dyke	
November 6	"Walk On By"	Leroy Van Dyke	
November 13	"Walk On By"	Leroy Van Dyke	
November 20	"Big Bad John"	Jimmy Dean	
November 27	"Big Bad John"	Jimmy Dean	
December 4	"Walk On By"	Leroy Van Dyke	
December 11	"Walk On By"	Leroy Van Dyke	
December 18	"Walk On By"	Leroy Van Dyke	
December 25	"Walk On By"	Leroy Van Dyke	

== See also ==
- 1961 in music
- 1961 in country music
- List of artists who reached number one on the U.S. country chart

== Notes and references ==
Notes
A. The last issue of 1960 was dated December 31, but the next issue was dated January 9 due to a change in how Billboard dated its issues.
