= 1961 in country music =

This is a list of notable events in country music that took place in 1961.

== Events ==
- March 17 – September 22 — NBC-TV airs Five Star Jubilee, a weekly show featuring five rotating hosts: Rex Allen, Snooky Lanson, Tex Ritter, Carl Smith and Jimmy Wakely.
- June 14 — Patsy Cline is seriously injured after a car accident. While in the hospital, the song "I Fall to Pieces" becomes a huge country-pop crossover hit.

=== No dates ===
- The Country Music Association (CMA) develops and finalizes plans for the new Country Music Hall of Fame, to honor performers and others who were influential in the history of the genre. The first three inductees, honored on November 3, are all posthumous:
  - Jimmie Rodgers, a songwriter who – despite poor health – merged hillbilly and blues music into a revolutionary new sound.
  - Fred Rose, a pioneering song publisher who formed the Acuff-Rose music publishing company in the 1940s. Also a talented songwriter, and record producer/executive.
  - Hank Williams Sr., legendary singer-songwriter whose songs are still sought after today.

With just a $1,500 budget, bronze plaques honoring each of the singers would be cast, a tradition that continues today.

- Spade Cooley is arrested in connection with the beating death of his second wife, Ella Mae Evans. He is convicted and sentenced to prison. En route to prison, he suffers a heart attack, from which he will recover.

== Top hits of the year ==
=== Number one hits ===
==== United States ====
(as certified by Billboard)

| Date | Single Name | Artist | Wks. No.1 | Spec. Note |
|---|---|---|---|---|
| January 9 | North to Alaska | Johnny Horton | 5 | ^{[B]} |
| February 27 | Don't Worry | Marty Robbins | 10 |
| May 8 | Hello Walls | Faron Young | 9 | Young's first Billboard Number One since "Country Girl" in 1959. |
| July 10 | Heartbreak U.S.A. | Kitty Wells | 4 | ^{[B]} |
| August 7 | I Fall to Pieces | Patsy Cline | 2 | ^{[1]}^{[A]} |
| August 21 | Tender Years | George Jones | 7 | ^{[2]}: Jones' first Billboard Number One since "White Lightning" in 1959. |
| September 25 | Walk on By | Leroy Van Dyke | 19 | ^{[2]}^{[C]} |
| November 20 | Big Bad John | Jimmy Dean | 2 | ^{[A]}: Also reached Number One on the Billboard Top Pop 100 and Hot Adult Contemporary Tracks charts. |

Notes

- ^{[1]} No. 1 song of the year, as determined by Billboard.
- ^{[2]} Song dropped from No. 1 and later returned to top spot.
- ^{[A]} First Billboard No. 1 hit for that artist.
- ^{[B]} Last Billboard No. 1 hit for that artist.
- ^{[C]} Only Billboard No. 1 hit for that artist to date.

=== Other major hits ===
| US | Single | Artist |
|---|---|---|
| 8 | Backtrack | Faron Young |
| 9 | Be Quiet Mind | Del Reeves |
| 5 | Beggar to a King | Hank Snow |
| 18 | Big, Big Love | Wynn Stewart |
| 7 | Big River, Big Man | Claude King |
| 16 | Black Land Farmer | Frankie Miller |
| 4 | The Blizzard | Jim Reeves |
| 14 | Blue Blue Day | The Wilburn Brothers |
| 14 | Conscience I'm Guilty | Rose Maddox |
| 16 | Cozy Inn | Leon McAuliffe |
| 11 | Crazy Bullfrog | Lewis Pruitt |
| 15 | Did I Ever Tell You | George Jones and Margie Singleton |
| 14 | Diggy Liggy Lo | Rusty & Doug |
| 14 | Don't Let Your Sweet Love Die | Reno and Smiley |
| 14 | Everybody's Dying for Love | Jimmy C. Newman |
| 16 | Family Bible | George Jones |
| 9 | Flat Top | Cowboy Copas |
| 2 | Foolin' Around | Buck Owens |
| 15 | Forever Gone | Ernest Ashworth |
| 20 | Forget the Past | Faron Young |
| 12 | From Here to There to You | Hank Locklin |
| 10 | Go Home | Flatt & Scruggs |
| 11 | The Hands You're Holding Now | Skeeter Davis |
| 12 | Hangover Tavern | Hank Thompson |
| 7 | Happy Birthday to Me | Hank Locklin |
| 5 | Heart Over Mind | Ray Price |
| 4 | Hello Fool | Ralph Emery |
| 7 | How Do You Talk to a Baby | Webb Pierce |
| 5 | I Dreamed of a Hill-Billy Heaven | Tex Ritter |
| 12 | I Love You Best of All | The Louvin Brothers |
| 15 | I Want to Live Again | Rose Maddox |
| 9 | I Went Out of My Way (To Make You Happy) | Roy Drusky |
| 10 | I'd Rather Loan You Out | Roy Drusky |
| 4 | I'll Just Have a Cup of Coffee (Then I'll Go) | Claude Gray |
| 17 | In Memory of Johnny Horton | Johnny Hardy |
| 3 | It's Your World | Marty Robbins |
| 11 | Kisses Never Lie | Carl Smith |
| 14 | Kissing My Pillow | Rose Maddox |
| 11 | Last Date | Floyd Cramer |
| 5 | Let Forgiveness In | Webb Pierce |
| 20 | Lonelyville | Ray Sanders |
| 4 | Loose Talk | Buck Owens and Rose Maddox |
| 10 | Louisiana Man | Rusty & Doug |
| 7 | Loving You (Was Worth This Broken Heart) | Bob Gallion |
| 8 | Mental Cruelty | Buck Owens and Rose Maddox |
| 3 | My Ears Should Burn (When Fools Are Talked About) | Claude Gray |
| 5 | My Last Date (With You) | Skeeter Davis |
| 7 | Odds and Ends (Bits and Pieces) | Warren Smith |
| 13 | Oh Lonesome Me | Johnny Cash |
| 7 | Oklahoma Hills | Hank Thompson |
| 17 | One Grain of Sand | Eddy Arnold |
| 14 | One Step Ahead of My Past | Hank Locklin |
| 20 | One Way Street | Bob Gallion |
| 10 | Optimistic | Skeeter Davis |
| 19 | The Other Cheek | Kitty Wells |
| 11 | Please Mr. Kennedy | Jim Nesbitt |
| 9 | Po' Folks | Bill Anderson |
| 12 | Polka on a Banjo | Flatt & Scruggs |
| 15 | Ragged but Right | Moon Mullican |
| 11 | The Restless One | Hank Snow |
| 9 | Right or Wrong | Wanda Jackson |
| 8 | San Antonio Rose | Floyd Cramer |
| 2 | Sea of Heartbreak | Don Gibson |
| 16 | Shorty | Jimmy Smart |
| 10 | Signed Sealed and Delivered | Cowboy Copas |
| 20 | Sleep, Baby, Sleep | Connie Hall |
| 9 | Sleepy-Eyed John | Johnny Horton |
| 3 | Soft Rain | Ray Price |
| 16 | Stand at Your Window | Jim Reeves |
| 12 | Sunny Tennessee | Cowboy Copas |
| 6 | Sweet Dreams | Don Gibson |
| 3 | Sweet Lips | Webb Pierce |
| 20 | Sweethearts Again | Bob Gallion |
| 20 | There Must Be Another Way to Live | Kitty Wells |
| 16 | Thoughts of a Fool | Ernest Tubb |
| 2 | Three Hearts in a Tangle | Roy Drusky |
| 9 | Three Steps to the Phone (Millions of Miles) | George Hamilton IV |
| 14 | Through That Door | Ernest Tubb |
| 13 | To You and Yours (From Me and Mine) | George Hamilton IV |
| 10 | Too Many Times | Don Winters |
| 13 | The Twenty-Fourth Hour | Ray Price |
| 2 | Under the Influence of Love | Buck Owens |
| 9 | Walk Out Backwards | Bill Anderson |
| 5 | Walking the Streets | Webb Pierce |
| 15 | What Would You Do | Jim Reeves |
| 6 | When Two Worlds Collide | Roger Miller |
| 2 | Window Up Above | George Jones |
| 8 | Wreck on the Highway | Wilma Lee and Stoney Cooper |
| 14 | You Don't Want My Love | Roger Miller |
| 4 | You're the Reason | Bobby Edwards |
| 14 | You're the Reason | Hank Locklin |
| 16 | You're the Reason | Joe South |
| 10 | Your Old Love Letters | Porter Wagoner |

== Top new album releases ==
| Album | Artist | Record Label |
|---|---|---|
| At the Golden Nugget | Hank Thompson | Capitol |
| Buck Owens | Buck Owens | Capitol |
| Buck Owens Sings Harlan Howard | Buck Owens | Capitol |
| Chet Atkins' Workshop | Chet Atkins | RCA |
| Cowboy Copas Sings the Songs That Made Him Famous | Cowboy Copas | Starday |
| Got You on My Mind | Jean Shepard | Capitol |
| Here's the Answer | Skeeter Davis | RCA |
| Hank Snow Souvenirs | Hank Snow | RCA |
| Chet Atkins in Hollywood | Chet Atkins | RCA |
| Let's Make Memories Tonight | Eddy Arnold | RCA |
| A Man and His Guitar | Chet Atkins | RCA |
| The Most Popular Guitar | Chet Atkins | RCA |
| Our Favorite Folk Songs | The Browns | RCA |
| Patsy Cline Showcase | Patsy Cline | Decca |
| Right or Wrong | Wanda Jackson | Capitol |
| San Antonio Rose | Ray Price | Columbia |
| The Wild, Wicked But Wonderful West | Johnny Bond | Starday |
| The Versatile Burl Ives | Burl Ives | Decca |

== Births ==
- July 1 — Michelle Wright, country star of the 1990s; best known for the hit "Take It Like a Man".
- July 8 — Toby Keith, country star of the 1990s who became a mega-superstar in the 2000s (decade), thanks to his fusion of honky tonk, love ballads and rock (d. 2024).
- August 25 — Billy Ray Cyrus, honky-tonk heartthrob of the 1990s and 2000s (decade), thanks to the huge success of "Achy Breaky Heart".
- December 7 – Dawn Sears, backing vocalist for Vince Gill and member of The Time Jumpers (d. 2014).

== Deaths ==
- September 20 – Karl Farr, member of the Sons of the Pioneers.

== Country Music Hall of Fame Inductees ==
- Jimmie Rodgers (1897–1933)
- Fred Rose (1898–1954)
- Hank Williams Sr. (1923–1953)

== Major awards ==
=== Grammy Awards ===
- Best Country and Western Recording — "Big Bad John", Jimmy Dean

== See also ==
- Country Music Association
- Inductees of the Country Music Hall of Fame
