= Senator Kruse =

Senator Kruse may refer to:

- Benjamin Kruse (politician) (born 1978), Minnesota State Senate
- Dean Kruse (born 1941), Indiana State Senate
- Dennis Kruse (born 1946), Indiana State Senate
- Jeff Kruse (born 1951), Oregon State Senate
- Lowen Kruse (1929–2017), Nebraska State Senate
