= The Best of Faron Young Vol. 2 =

Compilation album by Faron Young
- Released: January 1977
- Genre: Country
- Label: Mercury
- Producer: Jerry Kennedy

Faron Young chronology
I'd Just Be Fool Enough (1976)	The Best of Faron Young Vol. 2 (1977)	That Young Feelin (1978)

The Best of Faron Young Vol. 2 is a compilation album by American country music singer and songwriter Faron Young, released in 1977 by Mercury Records. The album, composed of tracks recorded between 1970 and 1976, reached No. 24 on the US country music chart.

== Track listing ==
Side 1

1. "It's Four in the Morning" (Jerry Chesnut) – 2:55
2. "I'd Just be Fool Enough" (Melvin Endsley) – 3:00
3. "Goin' Steady" (F. Young) – 2:04
4. "Another You" (J. Peppers) – 2:17
5. "Leavin' and Sayin' Goodbye" (J. Seeley) – 2:26
6. "(The Worst You Ever Gave Me Was) The Best I Ever Had" (D. Hice/R. Hice)" – 2:28

Side 2

1. "Here I Am in Dallas" (L. Morris/R. Hughes/T. Ishmall) – 2:35
2. "Some Kind of Woman" (J. Peppers/T. Cash) – 2:35
3. "She Fights That Lovin' Feeling" (J. Adams) – 2:51
4. "Feel Again" (J. M. Virgin) – 2:38
5. "This Little Girl of Mine" (J. Crutchfield) – 2:57
6. "Step Aside" (R. Griff) – 2:41

== Singles chart positions ==
Year	Single	Chart positions
Year	Single	US Country
1977	"(The Worst You Ever Gave Me Was) The Best I Ever Had"	30

== Production ==
- Produced by Jerry Kennedy
- String arrangements by Cam Mullins
- Recorded at U.S. Recording Studios Inc. and Mercury Custom Recording Studio, Nashville, Tennessee
- Mastering by M. C. Rather, Columbia Record Productions.
- Album cover illustration by John Youssi
