= Faron Young Sings the Best of Faron Young =

Compilation album by Faron Young
- Released: 1960
- Genre: Country
- Length: 26:42
- Label: Capitol

Faron Young chronology
| Talk About Hits! (1959) | Faron Young Sings the Best of Faron Young (1960) | Hello Walls (1961) |

Singles from Faron Young Sings the Best of Faron Young
- 1. "Alone with You" Released: May 23, 1958; 2. "That's the Way It's Gotta Be" Released: March 1, 1959; 3. "Country Girl" Released: June 13, 1959; 4. "Riverboat" Released: October 28, 1959; 5. "Your Old Used to Be" Released: February 19, 1960

Professional ratings
Review scores
| Source | Rating |
|---|---|
| AllMusic | 3/5 stars |

Faron Young Sings the Best of Faron Young (also known as Sings the Best) is a compilation album by country music singer Faron Young.

== Track listing ==
| No. | Title | Writer(s) | Length |
|---|---|---|---|
| 1. | "Riverboat" | Bill Anderson | 2:20 |
| 2. | "Lifetime Isn't Long Enough" | Arthur Korb | 2:23 |
| 3. | "Face to the Wall" | Bill Anderson, Faron Young | 2:21 |
| 4. | "Everytime I'm Kissing You" | Carl Belew, Johnny Horton, Faron Young | 2:17 |
| 5. | "Long Time Ago" | Merle Kilgore, Faron Young | 2:39 |
| 6. | "That's the Way It's Gotta Be" | Roy Drusky | 1:56 |
| 7. | "Your Old Used to Be" | Faron Young, Hilda Young | 2:35 |
| 8. | "I Hear You Talkin'" | Faron Young | 2:09 |
| 9. | "Country Girl" | Roy Drusky | 2:07 |
| 10. | "Alone with You" | Roy Drusky, Lester Vanadore, Faron Young | 1:58 |
| 11. | "I'll Be Alright (In the Morning)" | Roy Drusky, Bob Stroud, Faron Young | 1:59 |
| 12. | "I Hate Myself (For Falling in Love With You)" | Cliff Crofford | 1:58 |
