= Story Songs for Country Folks =

Studio album by Faron Young
- Released: 1964
- Recorded: October 29, 1963
- Studio: Bradley's Recording Studio, Nashville
- Genre: Country
- Label: Mercury Records

Faron Young chronology
Faron Young Aims at the West (1963)	Story Songs for Country Folks (1964)	Country Dance Favorites (1964)

Story Songs for Country Folks is a studio album by country music singer Faron Young with backing vocals by The Jordanaires. It was released in 1964 by Mercury Records (catalog SR-60896).

The album debuted on Billboard magazine's country album chart on February 15, 1964, peaked at No. 7, and remained on the chart for a total of 33 weeks.

AllMusic gave the album a rating of four-and-a-half stars.

== Track listing ==
Side A

1. "Rhinestones" (Merle Kilgore)
2. "Saw Mill" (Horace Whatley, Mel Tillis)
3. "Family Bible" (Claude Gray, Paul Buskirk, Walt Breeland)
4. "Company's Comin'" (Johnny Mullins)
5. "Pickin' Time" (Johnny Cash)
6. "Busted" (Harlan Howard)

Side B

1. "Sharecropper Family" (Jerry Smith)
2. "Old Courthouse (Danny Dill, Wayne P. Walker)
3. "Po Folks" (Bill Anderson)
4. "Mama Sang a Song" (Bill Anderson)
5. "Black Land Farmer" (Frankie Miller)
6. "Y'all Come" (Arlie Duff)
