= Russell W. Kruse =

American auctioneer (1922–2007)

- Born: December 12, 1922; Auburn, IN
- Died: May 4, 2007 (aged 84); Auburn, IN
- Scientific career
- Fields: Auctioneer

Russell Wayne Kruse (December 9, 1922 – May 4, 2007) was an American auctioneer best known for building the business of auctioning classic cars through Kruse International.

Born in Auburn, Indiana, he took up farming after graduating from high school. After losing crops to flooding two years in a row, he took up auctioneering to cover the costs of raising his seven children. He attended the Reppert School of Auctioneering in December 1952 and started a local real estate and farm auction business. He was a licensed auctioneer, real estate broker and certified residential appraiser in the state of Indiana.

In 1971, the Auburn Chamber of Commerce needed fundraising for their annual classic-car show. Kruse suggested auctioning off some of the antique cars. When a bidder's $61,000 bid for a locally made Duesenberg was turned down, the press picked up the story, and his fame as a car auctioneer took off. He started the Kruse Auction Institute in 1972 to give pre-licensing training to auctioneers. Russell was on the original Indiana Board of Auctioneers and served as chairman. He was also a past president of the Indiana Auctioneer's Association, and a member of their hall of fame, along with two of his son's - Dean Kruse and Dennis Kruse.

Because of the lucrative divisions that auctioned real estate and oil field equipment, ITT bought Kruse International in 1981, but the family bought it back in 1987. eBay then bought the company in 1999 but sold it back in 2003. Three of his sons are involved in the auction business: Dean Kruse, Dennis Kruse and Daniel Kruse, as well as eight grandchildren. He founded the Kruse Auction Institute in 1972, and served as an instructor at the Reppert School of Auctioneering from 1996 until his death in 2007.

His first wife, Luella (Boger), the mother of his seven children, died in 2000. Kruse died in Fort Wayne, Indiana of a stroke, aged 84.
