= Auction chant =

Repetition of numbers and filler words by auctioneers

A livestock auctioneer using auction chant at the New York State Sheep and Wool Festival in 2010

Auction chant (also known as "bid calling", "the auction cry", "the cattle rattle", or simply "auctioneering") is a rhythmic repetition of numbers and "filler words" spoken by auctioneers when taking bids at an auction. Auction chanting is a method of conducting live auctions frequently found in Europe and North America where it is practiced in English, Spanish, French and other languages. The chant consists of at least the current price, the asking price to outbid and words to keep the audience engaged. Auctioneers typically develop their own style, and competitions are held to judge them. Outside of auctions, the chant has been the subject of music and used in commercials and film.

== Description ==
The auction chant is a repetition of two numbers at a time which indicate the monetary amount involved with the sale of an item.

The first number is the amount of money which is currently being offered by a bidder for a given item. The second number is what the next bid needs to be in order to become the "high bidder", otherwise known as "the current man on". In between the numbers are "filler words" which are what the auctioneer says to tie the chant together making it smooth and rhythmic.

Filler words serve as a thinking point for both the auctioneer and the bidders. Filler words can serve to make a statement, ask questions, or can simply serve as a means of adding rhythm to the chant. Some typical filler words taught at auction schools, are "dollar bid", "now", and "will ya give me?". The typically taught chant for beginning auctioneers follows the pattern: "One dollar bid, now two, now two, will ya give me two? Two dollar bid, now three, now three, will ya give me three?", and continues in this fashion until the crowd stops bidding and the item is sold to the high bidder (automobile auctions have "reserves" or "minimum price" placed on all automobiles, so if the high bidder doesn't meet the reserve, they may be asked to raise their own bid in order to successfully purchase the vehicle in question).

Often prior to "closing the bidding" and selling an item, auctioneers will announce: "Going once, going twice, sold!" or "Going, going, gone!", followed by announcing the winning bid. Often auctioneers will stand at a lectern with a gavel, which they use to bang the lectern to end bidding on an item prior to announcing the winning bid. Slurring filler words to make multi-part filler word phrases is a key element, giving the illusion that the auctioneer is talking fast, meant to create more excitement and bidding anxiety among the bidding crowd.

== Style ==
Once auctioneers become experienced in the auction profession, they usually develop their own style with regards to unique filler words, unique rhythm, and variable speed of delivering the chant. Typically, automobile auctioneers at dealer-only auctions and livestock auctioneers are known for their high-speed chants.

=== Ringmen ===
Many chants are accompanied by the unique yelling of a "ringman" who is an assistant to the auctioneer in the "auction ring". Ringmen are themselves professionals. Because auctioneering can place considerable stress on the vocal cords over time, many auctioneers also choose to serve as ringmen, often alternating duties with one or more partner(s). Ringmen assist in spotting bids and communicating essential information back to the auctioneer.

== Competition ==
Auctioneers also can participate in "competitions" which crown regional and world champion auctioneers based on their chants, which is common in the auto and livestock auction industry, but not limited to them. Ringmen can also compete in competitions. The National Auctioneers Association as well as state specific Auctioneer Associations hold annual Auctioneer "bid calling competitions". These organizations also hold Ringmen competitions.

== In popular culture ==
Auction chants have found their way into the music and the entertainment arena, such as the 1956 song "The Auctioneer" by Leroy Van Dyke, which was about a relative of Van Dyke who was an auctioneer, and the 1995 hit single "Sold (The Grundy County Auction Incident)" by John Michael Montgomery. Radio commercials for the American Tobacco Company's brand, Lucky Strike cigarettes, featured tobacco auctioneer Lee Aubrey "Speed" Riggs's phrase "Sold, American!", which made its way into the 1940 film His Girl Friday.

The auction chant was explored in the 1976 documentary How Much Wood Would a Woodchuck Chuck, by Werner Herzog.

In an episode of The Simpsons titled Homer's Enemy (Season 8, episode 23), an auctioneer sells an abandoned factory for a dollar after a comedic auction chant.
