= Country Dance Favorites =

Studio album by Faron Young
- Released: 1964
- Genre: Country
- Label: Mercury Records

Faron Young chronology
Story Songs for Country Folks (1964)	Country Dance Favorites (1964)	Faron Young Sings The Best of Jim Reeves (1966)

Country Dance Favorites is a studio album by country music singer Faron Young. It was released in 1964 by Mercury Records (catalog SR-60931).

The album debuted on Billboard magazine's country album chart on October 3, 1964, peaked at No. 7, and remained on the chart for a total of 19 weeks.

AllMusic gave the album a rating of three stars.

== Track listing ==
Side A

1. "Save the Last Dance for Me"
2. "You Don't Know Me"
3. "Honky Tonk Song"
4. "Release Me (And Let Me Love Again)"
5. "Dance Her By Me (One More Time)"
6. "Am I That Easy to Forget"

Side B

1. "She Thinks I Still Care"
2. "Faded Love"
3. "Till I Waltz Again with You"
4. "I Can't Stop Loving You"
5. "San Antonio Rose"
6. "The Last Waltz"
