= Bocephus =

Bocephus may refer to:

- Hank Williams Jr., often known as Bocephus
  - Bocephus, a 1975 album by Hank Williams Jr.
- Rod Brasfield's ventriloquist dummy
