= Nick Lowe and His Cowboy Outfit (album) =

Studio album by Nick Lowe and His Cowboy Outfit
- Released: May 31, 1984
- Recorded: January 1984
- Studio: Ampro Studios (Shepherds Bush, London, UK); Riverside Studios and Eden Studios (Chiswick, London, UK); Boathouse Studios (Twickenham, UK)
- Genre: Rock and roll, rockabilly, roots rock, country rock, new wave, power pop
- Length: 37:17
- Label: F-Beat (UK, Australia, Japan and most of Europe); Columbia (US and Canada); RCA (Greece and Spain); Demon (1990 UK reissue)
- Producer: Nick Lowe; Colin Fairley; Paul "Bass" Riley; Elvis Costello

Nick Lowe and His Cowboy Outfit chronology
| The Abominable Showman (1983) | Nick Lowe and His Cowboy Outfit (1984) | The Rose of England (1985) |

Nick Lowe and His Cowboy Outfit is a 1984 album by British singer-songwriter Nick Lowe. The record marked the official debut of Lowe's new band, the Cowboy Outfit (although all of the band members had appeared on Lowe's previous album, The Abominable Showman). Nick Lowe and His Cowboy Outfit was reissued in 2000 by Demon Music Group.

Nick Lowe and His Cowboy Outfit incorporates more of a roots rock feel than Lowe's previous albums, including nods to Tex-Mex music ("Half a Boy and Half a Man"), 1950s guitar instrumentals ("Awesome"), and country music (via a cover of Faron Young's "Live Fast, Love Hard, Die Young"). Other notable tracks include the soul-influenced "L.A.F.S."—which was co-produced and arranged by Elvis Costello (a role reversal of sorts, as Lowe had produced Costello's first five albums).

The album also includes a cover of Mickey Jupp's "You'll Never Get Me Up in One of Those", which had been previously recorded by Lowe's former Rockpile bandmate Dave Edmunds (the Edmunds version can be heard on his album Twangin...). Rockpile had also played as backing band on the Jupp original, on his 1978 album Juppanese.

== Reception ==
Professional ratings
Review scores
| Source | Rating |
|---|---|
| AllMusic | 3.5/5 stars |
| Robert Christgau | B+ |

Despite good reviews (including a B+ grade from critic Robert Christgau), Nick Lowe and His Cowboy Outfit only reached No. 113 on the Billboard 200. The first single off the album, "Half a Boy and Half a Man", would become a moderate chart hit in the UK, reaching No. 53.

== Track listing ==
All songs written by Nick Lowe except as noted.

1. "Half a Boy and Half a Man" – 2:52
2. "Breakaway" (Tom Springfield) – 3:38
3. "You'll Never Get Me Up in One of Those" (Mickey Jupp) – 4:38
4. "Love Like a Glove" (Carlene Carter, James Eller) – 3:14
5. "The Gee and the Rick and the Three Card Trick" – 4:19
6. "(Hey Big Mouth) Stand Up and Say That" – 2:47
7. "Awesome" (Lowe, Profile) – 2:48
8. "God's Gift to Women" – 3:30
9. "Maureen" – 3:04
10. "L.A.F.S." – 3:32
11. "Live Fast, Love Hard, Die Young" (Joe Allison) – 2:39

Note: the US and UK versions of the album had different track orders; the above is the US order. However, there are no song differences between the two.

== Personnel ==
The Cowboy Outfit

- Nick Lowe – vocals, guitars, bass
- Paul Carrack – keyboards, backing vocals
- Martin Belmont – guitars
- Bobby Irwin – drums, backing vocals

Additional musicians

- Billy Bremner – guitars (2, 4)
- Bobby Valentino – fiddle (8)
- Robert Kirby – string arrangements (10)

The TKO Horns on "L.A.F.S."

- Jeff Blythe – saxophones
- Paul Speare – saxophones
- Jim Paterson – trombone
- Dave Plews – trumpet
- Elvis Costello – horn arrangements

=== Production ===
- Nick Lowe – producer (1–9, 11)
- Paul "Bass" Riley – co-producer (1–9, 11)
- Colin Fairley, – co-producer
- Elvis Costello – producer (10)
- Irene Kelly – assistant engineer
- Chris Ludwinski – assistant engineer
- Colin Phillips – assistant engineer
- Tony Phillips – assistant engineer
- Chimp Carver – design
- Keith Morris – photography
