= The Auctioneer =

Single by Leroy Van Dyke
- B-side: "I Fell in Love with a Pony-Tail"
- Released: September 21, 1956
- Recorded: 1956
- Genre: Country; novelty
- Length: 2:52
- Label: Dot
- Songwriters: Leroy Van Dyke; Buddy Black

Leroy Van Dyke singles chronology
"The Auctioneer" (1956)	"Walk On By" (1961)

"The Auctioneer" (also known as "The Auctioneer's Song") is a 1956 country song by Leroy Van Dyke. It was co-written with Buddy Black.

The song is notable for its interspersal of auction chants.

== Origin ==
Van Dyke was inspired to write the song from his own experiences as an auctioneer and those of his second cousin, Ray Sims.

He wrote it while stationed in Korea during the Korean War, and first performed it to troops on the same bill as Marilyn Monroe. After finishing his service, Van Dyke entered the song in a Chicago talent contest. It gained him a record contract with Dot Records. "The Auctioneer" subsequently reached the top 10 on the country charts and the top 20 on the pop chart, selling 2.5 million copies.

== Storyline ==
The song talks of a young Arkansas boy who would skip school and visit a local auction barn. Becoming mesmerized by the auction chant, he decides he wants to be an auctioneer, regularly practising the chant behind the family barn.

Though his parents are initially displeased with his career choice, they eventually relent, but (not wanting their family name to be tarnished because of poor auctioneering skills) they send him to auction school to properly learn the trade.

He returns home a full-fledged auctioneer. Gradually, he becomes a top quality auctioneer, to a point where he ends up purchasing an airplane just to keep up with his sudden business demands.

Van Dyke later stated that the story was largely true; the only artistic license he took with it was changing his cousin's home state from Missouri to Arkansas for scansion purposes: "nothing rhymed with Missouri."

== Covers ==
"The Auctioneer" has been covered by numerous artists, most notably Lynn Anderson, and by Steve Goodman, who played it live while opening for Steve Martin. It was also included on Goodman's posthumous album, No Big Surprise, in 1994. It was also performed by Gordon Lightfoot during live performances for years, and he eventually made a studio recording of the song, which was featured on his album Dream Street Rose in 1980.

== Other versions ==
Czech singer and songwriter Michal Tučný adapted the lyrics and translated it into the Czech language under the name Prodavač ("Shop assistant") some time between 1974 and 1980. He describes his childhood admiration of a shop assistant in a local store, followed by his own entry into this profession, from which he ultimately turned to music. Finally he concludes, that in the year 2000 there may be no LP records or gramophones, but trade will flourish anyway, and he (half-jokingly) dreams about becoming a store manager.

The song is sampled in AJR's 2025 song The Big Goodbye.

== Sources ==
- American Film Institute (1997), The American Film Institute Catalog of Motion Pictures Produced in the United States: Feature Films, 1961-1970, vol. 2, Berkeley, CA: University of California Press, ISBN 0-520-20970-2
- Mays, James C (2006), Savvy Guide to Buying Collector Cars at Auction, Indy Tech Publishing, ISBN 0-7906-1322-0
- Murrells, Joseph (1978), The Book of Golden Discs, London: Barrie & Jenkins, ISBN 0-214-20480-4
- Peppiatt, Francesca (2004), Country Music's Most Wanted: The Top 10 Book of Cheatin' Hearts, Honky-Tonk Tragedies, and Music City Oddities, Dulles, VA: Brassey's, ISBN 1-57488-593-6
