= May the Good Lord Bless and Keep You =

1950 song by Meredith Willson

"May the Good Lord Bless and Keep You" is a popular song by Meredith Willson, originally published in 1950.

The song is now considered a standard, recorded by many artists.

It was used as Tallulah Bankhead's theme song for her NBC radio program, The Big Show. Bankhead would recite the words in her husky voice, with guest stars joining in reciting the words, one line per star, which made a memorable ending for the show.

However, it was most popular when it was regularly sung by Kate Smith on her early 1950s TV show as the closing song.

== Notable recordings ==
Many singers have recorded the song, including:

- Eddy Arnold, The Tennessee Plough Boys and his Guitar recorded in New York City on December 13, 1950. It was released by RCA Victor Records as catalog number 20-0425 (in USA) and by EMI on the His Master's Voice label as catalog number MH 148.
- Jose Mari Chan - included in his album Christmas in Our Hearts (1990).
- Perry Como - for his album When You Come to the End of the Day (1958)
- Bing Crosby - a single release recorded December 13, 1950 for Decca Records.
- Joni James - for her album Give Us This Day (1957).
- Katherine Jenkins - included in her album Sacred Arias (2008).
- Teddy Johnson - A 1951 single release for Columbia Records in the UK. Included in the compilation album These Were Our Songs - The Early 50s.
- Frankie Laine - A single release on Mercury-5580 and included in his album Music, Maestro, Please (1952).
- Liberace - included in his album My Inspiration (1961).
- Johnny Mathis - for his album Good Night, Dear Lord (1959)
- Jim Reeves - for his album Songs to Warm the Heart (1959).
- Cliff Richard - included in his album Good News (1967).
- Ernest Tubb - a single release for Decca in 1951.
- Tammy Wynette - included in her album Inspiration (1969)
- Faron Young - for his album My Garden of Prayer (1959)
- Aled Jones and Russell Watson - included in their album In Harmony (2018)

== See also ==
- Priestly Blessing, an ancient Jewish prayer with similar themes
