= This Is Faron Young! =

Studio album by Faron Young
- Released: 1959
- Genre: Country
- Length: 29:15
- Label: Capitol

Faron Young chronology
The Object of My Affection (1958)	This Is Faron Young! (1959)	My Garden of Prayer (1959)

Professional ratings
Review scores
Source	Rating
AllMusic	4.5/5 stars

This Is Faron Young! is the third album by country music singer Faron Young.

== Track listing ==
No.	Title	Writer(s)	Length
1.	"Live Fast, Love Hard, Die Young"	Joe Allison	2:18
2.	"Tattle Tale Tears"	Owen Peery, Faron Young	2:23
3.	"Goin' Steady"	Faron Young	2:39
4.	"It's a Great Life (If You Don't Weaken)"	Audrey Allison, Joe Allison, Faron Young	2:04
5.	"Just Married"	Tommy Collins	2:26
6.	"Sweet Dreams"	Don Gibson	2:44
7.	"If You Ain't Lovin' (You Ain't Livin')"	Tommy Collins	2:21
8.	"Have I Waited Too Long"	Linda Baggett, Webb Pierce	2:46
9.	"For the Love of a Woman Like You"	Gertrude Cox, Jack Rhodes	2:36
10.	"That's What It's Like to Be Lonesome"	Dan Welch	2:15
11.	"If That's the Fashion"	Tommy Collins	2:36
12.	"I've Got Five Dollars and It's Saturday Night"	Ted Daffan	2:07
