= Hello Walls (album) =

Studio album by Faron Young
- Released: 1961
- Genre: Country
- Length: 27:51
- Label: Capitol
- Producer: Ken Nelson; Marvin Hughes

Faron Young chronology
Faron Young Sings the Best of Faron Young (1960)	Hello Walls (1961)	The Young Approach (1961)

Professional ratings
Review scores
Source	Rating
AllMusic	5/5 stars

Hello Walls is the fifth album by country music singer Faron Young. The Wilburn Brothers sang background vocals.

== Track listing ==
No.	Title	Writer(s)	Length
1.	"Hello Walls"	Willie Nelson	2:22
2.	"There's Not Any Like You Left"	Faron Young	1:53
3.	"Big Shoes"	Justin Tubb	2:12
4.	"Is She All You Thought She'd Be"	Bud Auge, Roy Drusky	2:48
5.	"Anything Your Heart Desires"	Billy Walker	2:17
6.	"Forget the Past"	Faron Young	2:16
7.	"Congratulations"	Willie Nelson	2:25
8.	"A World So Full of Love"	Roger Miller, Faron Young	2:04
9.	"I Made a Fool of Myself"	Donny Young, Faron Young	2:03
10.	"Believing It Yourself"	Justin Tubb	2:21
11.	"Out of My Heart"	Buddy Killen, Faron Young	2:08
12.	"Let Old Mother Nature Have Her Way"	Louie Clark, Loys Sutherland	2:02
