= Mora, Missouri =

- Unincorporated community
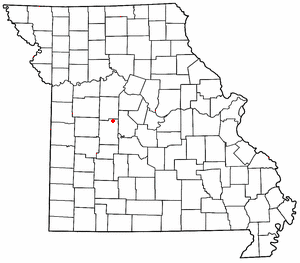
- Location of Mora in Missouri
- Coordinates: 38°31′25″N 93°12′57″W
- Country: United States
- State: Missouri
- County: Benton
- Elevation: 1,017 ft (310 m)
- Time zone: UTC-6 (Central (CST))
  - Summer (DST): UTC-5 (CDT)
- ZIP code: 65345
- Area code: 660
- GNIS feature ID: 722596

Mora is an unincorporated community in northern Benton County, Missouri, United States. It is located on Missouri Supplemental Route U approximately sixteen miles south of Sedalia.

Mora was laid out in 1882, when the railroad was extended to that point. A post office has been in operation at Mora since 1882.

Mora is the birthplace of country music singer Leroy Van Dyke. Stan Kroenke, a sports team owner, grew up in Mora and attended schools in Cole Camp.
