= The Object of My Affection (album) =

Studio album by Faron Young
- Released: 1958
- Genre: Country
- Length: 28:03
- Label: Capitol

Faron Young chronology
Sweethearts or Strangers (1957)	The Object of My Affection (1958)	This Is Faron Young! (1959)

Professional ratings
Review scores
Source	Rating
The Virgin Encyclopedia of Country Music	3/5 stars

The Object of My Affection is the second album by the country music singer Faron Young, released in 1958 via Capitol Records. The album contains country versions of many of the popular standards that Young sang as a teenager.

Buck Owens, Young's guitarist, wanted to sing on the album. Young declined the request, because he feared losing Owens to a solo career, but eventually helped to sign him after listening to a demo.

== Critical reception ==
Billboard wrote that the album included "pretty standards ... done up with poppish, slightly rocking backings."

== Track listing ==
No.	Title	Writer(s)	Length
1.	"Don't Take Your Love from Me"	Henry Nemo	2:58
2.	"If I Had You"	Jimmy Campbell, Reginald Connelly, Ted Shapiro	2:28
3.	"Stay as Sweet as You Are"	Mack Gordon, Harry Revel	2:45
4.	"My Darling, My Darling"	Frank Loesser	2:49
5.	"Who Wouldn't Love You"	Bill Carey, Carl T. Fisher	2:11
6.	"I Can't Believe That You're in Love with Me"	Clarence Gaskill, Jimmy McHugh	2:06
7.	"The Object of My Affection"	Jimmie Grier, Coy Poe, Pinky Tomlin	2:51
8.	"It All Depends on You"	Lew Brown, Buddy DeSylva, Ray Henderson	2:19
9.	"Thank You for a Lovely Evening"	Dorothy Fields, Jimmy McHugh	2:29
10.	"Everything I Have Is Yours"	Harold Adamson, Burton Lane	2:34
11.	"Nearness of You"	Hoagy Carmichael, Ned Washington	3:09
12.	"Sweet and Lovely"	Gus Arnheim, Jules LeMare, Harry Tobias	2:18
