= Sweethearts or Strangers =

Studio album by Faron Young
- Released: 1957
- Genre: Country
- Length: 29:04
- Label: Capitol

Faron Young chronology
Sweethearts or Strangers (1957)	The Object of My Affection (1958)

Professional ratings
Review scores
Source	Rating
AllMusic	2.5/5 stars

Sweethearts or Strangers is the debut album by country music singer Faron Young.

== Track listing ==
No.	Title	Writer(s)	Length
1.	"Sweethearts or Strangers"	Jimmie Davis, Lou Wayne	2:41
2.	"Your Cheatin' Heart"	Hank Williams	2:54
3.	"Shame on You"	Spade Cooley	2:10
4.	"I Can't Tell My Heart"	Marvin McCullough	2:33
5.	"Better Things Than These"	Red Hayes	2:19
6.	"You Call Everybody Darling"	Sam Martin, Ben Trace	2:06
7.	"I'm a Poor Boy"	Buck Peddy, Mel Tillis, Faron Young	2:08
8.	"I Can't Help It (If I'm Still in Love with You)"	Hank Williams	2:19
9.	"Worried Mind"	Ted Daffan, Jimmie Davis	2:18
10.	"I'll Be Yours"	Jim Odom	2:49
11.	"That's What It's Like to Be Lonesome"	Dan Welch	2:18
12.	"You Are My Sunshine"	Jimmie Davis, Charles Mitchell	2:29
