= Dean Kruse =

American politician (born 1941)

Dean V. Kruse
- Born: September 21, 1941 (age 85); Auburn, Indiana, U.S.

Dean V. Kruse (born September 21, 1941) is an American former auctioneer. He is also the former owner and CEO of Kruse International. Kruse started working in the local auction business founded by his father, Russell W. Kruse, and soon became the company's president. Known to many as the "Dean of Auctioneers," Kruse was once a well-respected member of the collector car hobby.

A 1957 graduate of the Reppert School of Auctioneering in Decatur, Indiana, Kruse cried his 5,000th auction in Houston in 1987, and is reportedly one of the youngest men to even attain that goal.

Kruse is a former Indiana State Senator. He was elected as a Democrat at the age of 25, in an election that maintained party control over that body, and served from 1966 to 1970. He is a past president of the Indiana Auctioneer's Association, and was elected as a member of their hall of fame, along with his father Russell and brother Dennis Kruse.

Dean was responsible for negotiating the purchase of his auction company in 1999 by online auctioneer eBay which paid $275 million for Kruse International and Billpoint. The company was purchased back from eBay by Dean Kruse in 2002. Kruse used part of the money he received from eBay to start two museums in Auburn; the World War II Victory Museum and the Kruse Automotive Horse Power and Carriage Museum.

On May 25, 2010, the Indiana Auctioneer Commission suspended Kruse's auctioneer's license for two years and permanently revoked the license of his company, Kruse, Inc., after receiving complaints that he had been failing to pay those who sold items through his auctions.
