= My Garden of Prayer =

Studio album by Faron Young
- Released: 1959
- Genres: Country, country gospel
- Length: 26:07
- Label: Capitol

Faron Young chronology
This Is Faron Young! (1959)	My Garden of Prayer (1959)	Talk About Hits! (1959)

My Garden of Prayer is the first gospel and fourth overall album by country music singer Faron Young.

== Track listing ==
No.	Title	Writer(s)	Length
1.	"I Know Who Holds Tomorrow"	Ira Stanphill	2:20
2.	"He Knows Just What I Need"	Mosie Lister	1:49
3.	"Now I Belong to Jesus"	Norman Clayton, Traditional	2:06
4.	"My Wonderful Lord"	Haldor Lilienas	2:32
5.	"My Home Sweet Home"	Napoleon Bonaparte Vandall, Traditional	2:50
6.	"Beautiful Garden of Prayer"	Eleanor Allen Schroll	2:34
7.	"Suppertime"	Ira Stanphill	2:42
8.	"May the Good Lord Bless and Keep You"	Meredith Willson	2:41
9.	"What Can He Do"	Rachel Rivers, Traditional	2:12
10.	"When I've Learned Enough to Live"	Traditional	2:17
11.	"I Won't Have to Cross Jordan Alone"	Charles Durham, Tom Ramsey	2:06
12.	"Traveling On"	Traditional	2:10
