= Jerry Chesnut =

American country music songwriter

Jerry Donald Chesnut (May 7, 1931 – December 15, 2018) was an American country music songwriter. His hits include "Good Year for the Roses" (originally recorded in 1970 by George Jones), "It's Four in the Morning" (recorded by Faron Young and Elvis Costello), and "T-R-O-U-B-L-E" (recorded by Elvis Presley in 1975 and Travis Tritt in 1992.)

Born and raised in Harlan County, Kentucky, he moved to Nashville in 1958 to pursue his career. In 1967, Del Reeves recorded Chesnut's "A Dime at a Time" to give the songwriter his first chart hit single. In 1968, Jerry Lee Lewis's hit recording of Chesnut's "Another Place, Another Time" was nominated for a Grammy Award. In 1972, Chesnut was named Billboard's Songwriter of the Year, and in 1992, he became a member of the Nashville Songwriters Hall of Fame.

Jerry Chesnut died in Nashville on December 15, 2018, at the age of 87.

== Selective list of songs ==
This list includes the song title and artist(s) who have recorded the song.

- "A Dime at a Time" – Del Reeves, Steep Canyon Rangers (as "One Dime at a Time")
- "Another Place, Another Time" – Jerry Lee Lewis, Arthur Alexander
- "Daddy Did His Best" – Porter Wagoner and Dolly Parton, Dale Ann Bradley
- "Don't She Look Good?" – Bill Anderson, Eddy Arnold
- "Good Year for the Roses" – George Jones, Alan Jackson, Elvis Costello, Counting Crows, Johnny Paycheck, Toni Willé
- "Holding on to Nothing" – Porter Wagoner and Dolly Parton
- "It's Four in the Morning" – Faron Young, Tom Jones, Ernest Tubb
- "Weakness In A Man" – Waylon Jennings, Roy Drusky
- "If Not for You" - George Jones
- "It's Midnight" – Elvis Presley
- "Looking at the World Through a Windshield" – Del Reeves, Son Volt, Commander Cody
- "Love Coming Down" – Elvis Presley
- "Love of a Rolling Stone" – Bonnie Tyler
- "Miles And Miles From Nowhere" – Arthur Alexander
- "Oney" – Johnny Cash
- "T-R-O-U-B-L-E" – Elvis Presley, Travis Tritt
- "They Don't Make 'em Like My Daddy" – Loretta Lynn
- "The Wonders You Perform" – Tammy Wynette
- "Woman Without Love" – Elvis Presley, Bob Luman, Joe Simon, Johnny Darrell, T.D. Valentine, Brook Benton
