= Kruse International =

Kruse International was an auction firm founded by Russell Kruse in Auburn, Indiana, in 1952. The company began as a local auction company selling real estate, farms and personal property run by Kruse and his sons Dean, Dennis and Daniel. The company held its first collector car auction in Auburn on Labor Day in 1971; the Labor Day auction became an annual event and grew to become the largest collector car auction in the world. After the success of this auction, the Kruses were asked by Tom Barrett to have a sale in Scottsdale, Arizona, the next January. This was the first annual sales that continues today. The Kruses were the first to sell a car for a documented $1 million in cash — a 1934 Duesenberg Model SJ La Grande long wheelbase dual-cowl phaeton. The Duesenberg was sold to Tom Monaghan, founder of Domino's Pizza and then owner of the Detroit Tigers.

The Kruse family is also noted for conducting the $41 million sale of the famous William F. Harrah automotive collection. The sale of this 1,000-car collection was spread over three auction sessions in 1985, 1986 and 1987. The company was sold to ITT in 1981, but the family bought it back in 1986. It was then sold to eBay for $275 million in 1999 but was purchased back by Dean Kruse in 2002.

On May 25, 2010, the Indiana Auctioneer Commission revoked the auctioneer's license of Dean Kruse amid charges that the company failed to pay clients who had sold items through the company. On July 1, 2010, Kruse sold its auction park, home to the annual Auburn auto auction, to RM Auctions of Canada.
