= It's Four in the Morning =

Single by Faron Young

from the album It's Four in the Morning
- B-side: "It's Not the Miles"
- Released: November 1971 (US)
- Recorded: 1971
- Genre: Country
- Label: Mercury
- Songwriter: Jerry Chesnut
- Producer: Jerry Kennedy

Faron Young singles chronology
"Leaving and Saying Goodbye" (1971)	"It's Four in the Morning" (1971)	"This Little Girl of Mine" (1972)

"It's Four in the Morning" (also known as "Four in the Morning") is a song made famous by country music singer Faron Young. Released in 1971, the song was his first number-one hit single on the Billboard Hot Country Singles chart since 1961's "Hello Walls". The song was written by Jerry Chesnut.

The song was the title track to his 1971 album and became one of his best-known hits. It was also a major smash in the UK, somewhat rare for a country song, peaking at number three in the UK Singles Chart in September 1972, as well as charting in the top 10 (number nine) in Australia, during late August 1972.

Its pop-crossover impact at home was far more minor, barely scraping the bottom of the Billboard Hot 100 at number 92 (it was Young's last appearance on the Hot 100). It sold over 500,000 copies in the UK, and 750,000 in North America by early 1973, earning Young a gold disc awarded by the Recording Industry Association of America.

A live-performance video clip of Young singing the song was the first music video to air on CMT when the cable television channel first launched on March 5, 1983, as CMTV.

== Chart performance ==
Chart (1971–72)	Peak position
Australian Go-Set Top 40	9
Canadian RPM Country Tracks	1
Irish Singles Chart	4
New Zealand (Listener)	2
UK Singles Chart	3
US Billboard Hot 100	92
US Hot Country Songs (Billboard)	1

== Cover versions ==
The song was covered by Tom Jones on his 1985 album Tender Loving Care. His version peaked at number 36 on the Billboard Hot Country Singles chart in 1986.

The song was also covered by Grammy-award winning Hall of Fame Western swing artist Bobby Flores in 2013.

Although not a cover version, the song is the topic of the song entitled "Faron Young" by Prefab Sprout. The lead chorus lines are “You give me Faron Young Four in the Morning”.
