= Half a Boy and Half a Man =

Single by Nick Lowe

from the album Nick Lowe and His Cowboy Outfit
- B-side: "Awesome"
- Released: 1984
- Genre: Rock and roll
- Length: 2:52
- Label: F-Beat
- Songwriter: Nick Lowe
- Producers: Nick Lowe, Colin Fairley, Paul Riley

Nick Lowe singles chronology
"Wish You Were Here" (1983)	"Half a Boy and Half a Man" (1984)	"L.A.F.S." (1984)

Music video
- "Half a Boy and Half a Man" on YouTube

"Half a Boy and Half a Man" is a 1984 song written by Nick Lowe. It was first included in his 1984 album Nick Lowe and His Cowboy Outfit. The song was then released as the lead single from the album.

The song was his most successful since "Cruel to Be Kind." It debuted at No. 77, and peaked at No. 53 on the UK singles chart, and it reached No. 66 in Australia. The single also peaked at number 110 on the Billboard Bubbling Under Hot 100 chart. A music video was made for the song.

== Critical reception ==
Cash Box writes that the song "is typical Nick: straight ahead, no-nonsense rock’n’roll slippin’ and a slidin’ around a set of pointedly sardonic lyrics." AllMusic's Stewart Mason calls the song a "breathless opener to an ultimately disappointing album," and that "Half a Boy and Half a Man" is "arguably the best thing Nick Lowe wrote in the '80s." Music Week described the song as "High energy, country-tinged rock 'n' roll with a fast pumping bass and Wurlitzer organ playing the main melody."

== Chart performance ==
Weekly charts
Chart (1984)	Peak position
Australia (Kent Music Report)	66
UK Singles (OCC)	53
U.S. Billboard Bubbling Under Hot 100	110

== Notable cover versions ==
- Queen Ida covered the song on her 1985 live album Caught in the Act, the song was recorded in San Francisco, California.
- George Thorogood and the Destroyers covered the song for their 1999 album Half a Boy/Half a Man. A live version of the song was also released on their live album Live in '99, recorded on June 6, 1999 at the Fox Theater in St. Louis, Missouri
- Los Straitjackets covered the song on their 2017 album What's So Funny About Peace Love and Los Straitjackets. The album contains only Nick Lowe covers. Their version is entirely instrumental.
