= Country Music Holiday =

1958 film

- Theatrical release poster
- Directed by: Alvin Ganzer
- Screenplay by: Harry Spalding
- Produced by: Howard B. Kreitsek; Ralph B. Serpe
- Starring: Ferlin Husky; Zsa Zsa Gabor; Rocky Graziano; Faron Young; Al Fisher; Lou Marks; June Carter Cash
- Cinematography: William J. Kelly
- Edited by: Ralph Rosenblum
- Production company: Aurora Productions
- Distributed by: Paramount Pictures
- Release date: March 1, 1958
- Running time: 81 minutes
- Country: United States
- Language: English

Country Music Holiday is a 1958 American musical film directed by Alvin Ganzer and written by Harry Spalding. The film stars Ferlin Husky, Zsa Zsa Gabor, Rocky Graziano, Faron Young, Al Fisher, Lou Marks and June Carter Cash. The film was released in March 1958, by Paramount Pictures.

== Plot ==
Though produced on a shoestring, Country Music Holiday has a lot more going for it than most popular-music melanges of the 1950s. Ferlin Husky stars as Verne Brand, a talented hillbilly warbler who is discovered by fast-talking Sonny Moon (Jesse White). Verne's rise to the top of country-western fame is compromised by the machinations of a predatory Hungarian lass (Zsa Zsa Gabor) who owns 50 percent of the boy's contract. The film boasts some of the strangest casting of any film of its era: Rocky Graziano, for example, costars as a savvy record-company executive, while Patty Duke is seen as Ferlin Husky's kid sister! In addition to Husky, Country Music Holiday offers such rural favorites as June Carter, The Jordanaires, Drifting Johnny Miller, Lonzo & Oscar, the La Dell Sisters and Bernie Nee. In comparison, the strip-joint comedy team of Al Fisher and Lou Marks seems as sophisticated and urbane as Noël Coward. ~ Hal Erickson, Rovi

== Cast ==
- Ferlin Husky as Verne Brand
- Zsa Zsa Gabor as herself
- Rocky Graziano as himself
- Faron Young as Clyde Woods
- Al Fisher as himself
- Lou Marks as himself
- June Carter Cash as Marietta
- Jesse White as Sonny Moon
- Cliff Norton as Morty Chapman
- Rod Brasfield as Pappy Brand
- Hope Wainwright as 'Ma' Brand
- Patty Duke as 'Sis' Brand
- Art Ford as himself
- Lew Parker as himself
- The Jordanaires as themselves
- Lonzo and Oscar as Comedy Team
- Drifting Johnny Miller as himself
- Ladell Sisters as themselves
- Bernie Knee as Bernie
