= Dennis Kruse =

American politician (born 1946)

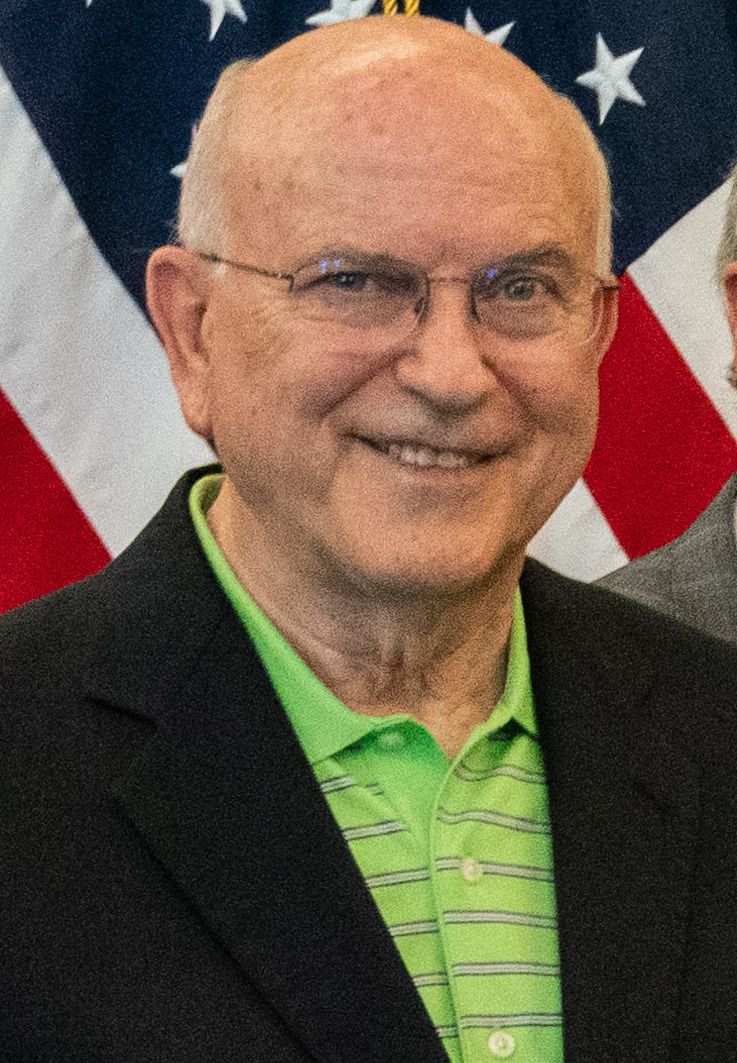

Member of the Indiana Senate from the 14th district
- In office April 14, 2004 – November 22, 2022
- Preceded by: Charles "Bud" Meek
- Succeeded by: Tyler Johnson

Member of the Indiana House of Representatives from the 51st district
- In office November 4, 1992 – April 14, 2004
- Preceded by: Vanessa Summers
- Succeeded by: Dick Dodge

Member of the Indiana House of Representatives from the 1st district
- In office August 19, 1989 – November 4, 1992
- Preceded by: Orville H. Moody
- Succeeded by: Ron Tabaczynski

Personal details
- Born: October 7, 1946 (age 79) Auburn, Indiana
- Party: Republican
- Education: Indiana University
- Profession: Auctioneer, politician

Dennis K. Kruse (born October 7, 1946) is an American businessman and politician. Kruse was a founder of the auction business Kruse International before entered politics as a Republican. He was a member of the Indiana House of Representatives from 1989 to 2004 and the Indiana Senate from 2004 to 2022, representing Senate District 14.

== Early life, education, and business career ==
Kruse started working in the local auction business with his father, Russell W. Kruse, and his older brother Dean Kruse. They were later joined by his younger brother, Daniel J. Kruse, and started what became Kruse International Collector Car Auctions in 1971.

In 1979, Kruse left the collector car business to focus on local auctions and real estate. A 1964 graduate of the Reppert School of Auctioneering in Decatur, Indiana, Kruse served as president of the auction school, from his purchase of the school in 1996, until its sale to the Christy family in Indianapolis in 2011. Kruse graduated from the School of Education at Indiana University in 1970, and was a licensed teacher in Indiana from 1970 to 1975. He currently serves on the board of trustees at Trine University in Angola, Indiana.

He is a past president of the Indiana Auctioneer's Association, and a member of their hall of fame. Kruse was president of the National Auctioneers Association from 2005 to 2006, and was instrumental in advocating for industry research for the auction profession. In 2013, Kruse was inducted into the National Auctioneers Association Hall of Fame.

== Political career ==
Kruse was an Indiana State Representative from 1989 to 2004. Originally, he was appointed to the 1st district after the death of incumbent State Representative Orville H. Moody. In 1992, after redistricting, Kruse was reelected into the 51st district. He was succeeded by Ron Tabaczynski in the 1st district in 1992. Kruse succeeded Vanessa Summers in the 51st district. He was succeeded by Richard Dodge in the State House. Since 2004, Kruse has been a member of the Indiana Senate for the 14th District. He was appointed to the seat after the death of Charles "Bud" Meeks.

Kruse is a creationist and in 2012 proposed legislation to allow the teaching of "creation science" to be taught in Indiana schools, The National Center for Science Education strongly opposed the bill, noting that it would violate the Establishment Clause of the First Amendment and the Supreme Court's ruling in Edwards v. Aguillard. Kruse said: "I believe in creationism, and it's worthy of being taught equally with evolution theory. . . . Just because there are constitutional concerns doesn't mean you don't try to get something done you believe in." Kruse also introduced a bill during the 2013 session to allow school districts to mandate the recitation of the Lord's Prayer at the beginning of the day in Indiana public schools. Legal experts and the state Senate's legal committee stated that the proposal was unconstitutional.

In 2018, Kruse introduced legislation that would prohibit public schools from providing sex education to students without a parent's prior written permission ("opt-in"). The legislation would have changed the existing practice in may public schools, in which parents can exclude their children from sex education classes through an "opt-out" note. The legislation was backed by social conservatives and passed the state Senate, but Kruse's controversial proposal was removed in the state House version of the legislation.

Kruse served three years as chairman of the Senate Pensions and Labor Committee, then served as chairman of the influential Senate Committee on Education and Career Development from 2009 to 2018, resigning that position at the onset of his wife's health issues. He was known as a champion of community college and received an honorary degree from Ivy Tech Community College in 2016, at the time, the nation's largest, singly-accredited community college.

Kruse announced he would not seek re-election in 2022 and would instead retire. Republican Tyler Johnson, a physician at Parkview DeKalb Hospital in Auburn, was elected to succeed Kruse to his Senate seat.
