= Half a Boy/Half a Man =

Studio album by George Thorogood and the Destroyers
- Released: April 13, 1999
- Recorded: 1999
- Studio: Compass Point Studios
- Genre: Blues rock; Boogie rock
- Length: 43:08
- Label: CMC International
- Producer: Terry Manning the Delaware Destroyers

George Thorogood and the Destroyers chronology
Rockin' My Life Away (1997)	Half a Boy/Half a Man (1999)	Ride 'Til I Die (2003)

Singles from Half a Boy/Half a Man
- 1. "I Don't Trust Nobody" Released: 1999; 2. "Be Bop Grandma" Released: 1999

Half a Boy/Half a Man is the eleventh studio album by American blues rock band George Thorogood and the Destroyers. It was released in 1999, on the CMC International label. The band supported the album with a world tour.

After being dropped by EMI America, the Destroyers signed with CMC International and released the album on April 13, 1999. The album received mixed reviews from critics, and failed to chart in any capacity.

== Background ==
In 1997, the Destroyers released Rockin' My Life Away, which failed to chart on the Billboard 200. The next year EMI America dropped them, so they signed with CMC International.

== Songs ==
The album consists of eleven songs, nine covers and two originals.

"I Don't Trust Nobody" is the album's opening track, written by Eddie Shaw, and also the lead single. "Double Shot" was written by Don Smith and Cyril Vetter. This song, and many others, feature Hank "Hurricane" Carter on keyboards, alongside saxophone. "Half a Boy, Half a Man" was written by Nick Lowe, while "Just Passin' Thru", and the album's closer, "Not Tonight", were both written by Thorogood. "Not Tonight" was written by Thorogood almost 15 years earlier, but no record company wanted to record it. The song is more of a slower country ballad, compared to the rest of the album.

== Release ==
CMC International released Half a Boy/Half a Man on April 13, 1999. The album failed to chart in any capacity. Two singles were released from the album, "I Don't Trust Nobody" was the lead single. It debuted at No. 35, and peaked at No. 24 on the Billboard Mainstream Rock charts. "Be Bop Grandma" was also released as a single, but it failed to chart. "I Don't Trust Nobody" was the band's final single to chart.

== Critical reception ==
Half A Boy/Half A Man received mixed reviews from critics.

Professional ratings
Review scores
Source	Rating
AllMusic	3/5 stars
Daily Vault	A
The Penguin Guide to Blues Recordings	2.5/4 stars

AllMusic's Stephen Thomas Erlewine wrote, "Unfortunately, the album isn't blessed with the strong material that characterized Rockin' My Life Away, but that album didn't have the raw, visceral edge that this album does. And when it comes to rockin' blues, sometimes it's better to have better sound than better songs." Daily Vault critic Christopher Thelen wrote "Half A Boy / Half A Man is an album that reaffirms Thorogood and the Destroyers' ability to work the blues into a frenzy that you hope will never stop. It's an album that must be experienced - but good luck getting it out of your CD player."

== Track listing ==
Half a Boy/Half a Man track listing
No.	Title	Writer(s)	Length
1.	"I Don't Trust Nobody"	Eddie Shaw	5:02
2.	"Double Shot"	Don Smith, Cyril Vetter	3:12
3.	"99 Days in Jail"	Willie Dixon, L. P. Weaver	3:53
4.	"Half a Boy, Half a Man"	Nick Lowe	3:27
5.	"As Long as I Have You"	Willie Dixon	4:04
6.	"B.I.G.T.I.M.E."	Keith Sykes	3:07
7.	"Be Bop Grandma"	Solomon Burke, Delores Burke	3:58
8.	"Nothing New"	Dave Bartholomew, Fats Domino, Jack Jessup, Murphy Maddux	3:24
9.	"Just Passin' Thru"	George Thorogood	4:43
10.	"Hellbound Train (Downbound Train)"	Chuck Berry	4:56
11.	"Not Tonight, I Have a Heartache"	George Thorogood	4:43
Total length:			43:08

== Personnel ==
The following personnel were credited in the album liner notes:

Musicians

- George Thorogood – vocals, rhythm guitar, slide guitar
- Billy Blough – bass guitar
- Hank Carter – saxophone, keyboards, lead guitar, vocals
- Jeff Simon – drums and percussion

Technical

- Terry Manning – producer, engineer, mixing
- The Delaware Destroyers – producers
- C. J. Buscaglia, Osie Bowe – assistant engineers
- Ted Jensen – mastering
- Mark Weiss – photography
