= Live Fast, Love Hard, Die Young =

"Live Fast, Love Hard, Die Young" was Faron Young's first number-one song and his fifth consecutive top ten hit. It spent three weeks at the top of the Billboard country music chart in 1955.

== Background ==
"This was a tune I detested", Young said. "Ken Nelson made me record this song. I put it out and it was a big, big hit. Then I got to liking it." The song mentions a Wampus cat.

The song idea came to Joe Allison while watching a gangster movie starring a young John Derek. Allison explained, "All through this picture he said, 'I want to die young and leave a good-looking corpse.' It struck me as a good idea for a song, so I wrote 'Live Fast, Love Hard, Die Young.' I didn't write it for anybody, but when Ken Nelson heard it, he said, 'We'll do that with Faron Young.'"

== Cover versions ==
- A 1955 version by Eddie Cochran was released in 1997 on the album Rockin' It Country Style.
- A 1961 version by Conway Twitty was included on the album The Conway Twitty Touch
- Nick Lowe released a version of the song on his 1984 album Nick Lowe and His Cowboy Outfit.

== Popular culture ==
- Live Fast, Love Hard: The Faron Young Story is a 2007 biography written by Diane Diekman and published by the University of Illinois Press.
