= Reppert School of Auctioneering =

The Reppert School of Auctioneering is an auctioneer education provider, since 1921.

== History ==
The Reppert School of Auctioneering was founded in 1921 by Col. Fred Reppert of Decatur, Indiana. Fred Reppert started in the auction business as a young boy and quickly rose to the top of his profession, selling auctions in every state of America, and in every province of Canada and Mexico.

The school's tradition as an institution for auction education was carried on by Fred Reppert's daughter Eleanor and later by his son Rolland Reppert, M.D., who both owned and operated the school, with the assistance of Quentin R. Chaffee, who served as the school's dean of instruction. Phil Neuenschwander and Ron Chaffee then operated the school from 1980 until 1996, when it was purchased by Dennis Kruse of Auburn, Indiana. Dennis Kruse, a 1964 graduate of Repperts, a past president of the National Auctioneers Association, Indiana State Senator, and Trine University Board of Trustees member, now serves as president emeritus of the auction school. In May 2011, Reppert Auction School was purchased by Jack Christy and his daughter Melissa Davis of Christy's of Indiana. John Kruse, Dennis's son and one of the principles of Worldwide Auctioneers, purchased the school in September 2017. He is now president of the school, and his brother Matthew Kruse is the Dean of Instruction. Ron Chaffee served as the dean and dean emeritus of the school until his death in 2019. His father Q.R. Chaffee was Dean of the school from 1938 until his death.

The school held three-week classes twice a year from 1921 to 1985, with all the classes being held in Decatur, Indiana, with the exception of one class given in Colorado. In 1985, the school format was changed to two weeks, and was offered three times a year. After the purchase by Dennis Kruse, the number of class terms was expanded to four a year, with additional classes being given for a short time in Scottsdale, Arizona, and Indianapolis, Indiana. The auction school gave classes in Indianapolis from 2012 through 2018. The school currently offers a ten-day auction training class three times a year in their Auburn, Indiana location at Kruse Plaza.

The Reppert School of Auctioneering has had graduates from every state in the United States, as well as multiple foreign countries, and is the nation's longest continually operated auction school, with classes every year since 1921.

== Location ==
The auction school was originally located in Decatur, Indiana. The school was located on the Reppert Farm, which was also the location of the Bellmont Track and is the current location of Bellmont High School. Reppert was moved to Auburn, Indiana, from 1996 to 2011. Reppert then moved to Indianapolis from 2011 to 2017 and was held at the Christy's Auction Gallery. The auction school moved back to Auburn in 2017.

== Curriculum ==
Repperts School of Auctioneering has an 80-hour, ten-day course that focuses on the business aspects of the auction profession. The curriculum is divided into seven sections, which include:

1. Instruction on how to set up and manage an auction business
2. The legal aspects of auctions
3. Advertising and marketing
4. The auction chant, bid calling, voice and ringwork
5. Auction preparation, conduction and settlement
6. Appraising and real estate
7. Specialty Auction types

Repperts is approved to offer pre-licensing education in almost every state that requires attendance at an auction school. Repperts provides the required hours of auction instruction for Alabama, Florida, Georgia, Indiana, Louisiana, Michigan, Mississippi, New Hampshire, North Carolina, Ohio, South Carolina, Tennessee, Texas, Virginia, and West Virginia.

== Continuing Education ==
The Reppert School of Auctioneering is also a provider of continuing education for auctioneers. Repperts is approved to offer continuing education in multiple states and has provided seminars for multiple state auctioneer associations.
