= Rod Brasfield =

American singer-songwriter (1910–1958)

- Brasfield c. 1950
- Born: Rodney Leon Brasfield; August 22, 1910; Smithville, Mississippi, U.S.
- Died: September 12, 1958 (aged 48); Martin, Tennessee, U.S.
- Occupation: Comedian
- Years active: 1947–1958
- Known for: Grand Ole Opry Member

Rodney Leon Brasfield (August 22, 1910 – September 12, 1958) was an American comedian who was prominently featured on the Grand Ole Opry from 1947 until his death in 1958. In 1987, he was inducted into the Country Music Hall of Fame.

== Life and career ==
Brasfield was born in Smithville, Mississippi, United States. He began his career in the late 1920s with Bisbee's Dramatic Shows, a touring tent repertory troupe, serving as a straight man for his older brother, actor and comedian Boob Brasfield. In 1931, he married Eleanor Humphrey, a Hohenwald, Tennessee, school teacher.

Brasfield was recruited by George D. Hay for the Grand Ole Opry in 1944. With his trademark baggy suit, battered hat and rubbery face, he could make audiences laugh before he spoke a word. He soon became the primary comic on The Prince Albert Show, the Opry's NBC Radio broadcast, playing off the show’s host, Red Foley. Assuming the role of a hapless hayseed, he often poked fun at country life—always with good humor.

He formed a double act in 1948 with Minnie Pearl, playing what she referred to as "double comedy", in which each of them delivered alternating punch lines and neither played the straight man. Some of these routines were broadcast on the Opry's live ABC television network show from 1955–56. He lived in Hohenwald, called himself the Hohenwald Flash, and often mentioned the local restaurant (which he once owned), the Snip-Snap-and-Bite, in his routines. Brasfield sometimes did ventriloquist routines with a dummy named Bocephus, after whom Hank Williams Sr. nicknamed his then-infant son Hank Williams Jr.; and also did comedy with June Carter.

In March 1956, Brasfield appeared with Elvis Presley at Atlanta's Fox Theatre. In A Face in the Crowd (1957) he played Andy Griffith's ex-con sidekick, and appeared in Country Music Holiday (1958). Heart failure combined with an ongoing problem with alcohol abuse, led to his death at age 48 in 1958 in Martin, Tennessee. He is buried in Smithville.

== Filmography ==
Year	Title	Role	Notes
1957	A Face in the Crowd	Beanie	
1958	Country Music Holiday	Pappy Brand	(final film role)

== Other sources ==
- Encyclopedia of Country Music, Country Music Hall of Fame and Museum (Oxford University Press)
- Faye, Byron "Remembering Rod Brasfield", FayFair's Opry Blog, August 22, 2011
- Rod Brasfield - Smithville at the Mississippi Country Music Trail
