= Country Girl (Faron Young song) =

Single by Faron Young

from the album Sings the Best
- B-side: "I Hear You Talkin'"
- Released: June 13, 1959
- Recorded: 1959
- Genre: country
- Length: 2:33
- Label: Capitol
- Songwriter: Roy Drusky

Faron Young singles chronology
"That's the Way It's Gotta Be" (1959)	"Country Girl" (1959)	"Riverboat" (1959)

"Country Girl" is a 1959 single by Faron Young, written by Roy Drusky. The single was Young's fourth number one on the country chart. "Country Girl" stayed on the charts for thirty-two weeks. The B-side, "I Hear You Talkin'", peaked at number twenty-seven on the country chart.
