= Bob Gallion =

American singer-songwriter

- Born: April 22, 1924; Ashland, Kentucky
- Origin: Nashville, Tennessee
- Died: August 20, 1999 (aged 75) Williamstown, West Virginia
- Genres: Country
- Occupations: Singer, talent agent
- Instruments: Vocals, guitar
- Years active: 1958–1973
- Label: MGM; Hickory; United Artists
- Formerly of: Pati Powell

Bob Gallion (April 22, 1924, in Ashland, Kentucky – August 20, 1999) was an American country music singer. Between 1958 and 1973, he recorded for various country labels, charting nine times on the Hot Country Songs charts. His biggest hit was "Wall to Wall Love", which went to number 5 in 1962.

== Biography ==
Bob Gallion was born April 22, 1924, in Ashland, Kentucky. In the 1940s, he worked as a session guitar player before joining Stoney Cooper and Wilma Lee Cooper's band. Gallion recorded for MGM Records in the 1950s, releasing the singles "That's What I Tell My Heart" and "You Take the Table and I'll Take the Chairs". In September 1959, he joined the promotion staff at Acuff-Rose Music.

Moving to Hickory Records in 1960, he charted five more singles, including the top 10 hits "Loving You (Was Worth This Broken Heart" and "Wall to Wall Love". Gallion worked as a disc jockey for WGUN in Atlanta Georgia, then returned to recording in 1968 with the single "Pick a Little Happy Song" on United Artists Records. He also toured with Pati Powell and performed at the WWVA Jamboree, and charted one last time with the duet "Love by Appointment". After this song, Gallion retired as a performer and worked at a booking agency.

He is also credited with composing several successful songs, including "Sweethearts Again" and "Love Pains", recorded by the Osborne Brothers.

Gallion died in 1999 at age 75, in Williamstown, West Virginia. He was survived by his wife, June, who continued to run his booking agency.

== Singles ==
Year	Title	Chart Positions
Year	Title	US Country
1958	"That's What I Tell My Heart"	28
1959	"You Take the Table and I'll Take the Chairs"	18
1960	"Loving You (Was Worth This Broken Heart)"	7
1961	"One Way Street"	20
1961	"Sweethearts Again"	20
1962	"Wall to Wall Love"	5
1963	"Ain't Got Time for Nothin'"	23
1968	"Pick a Little Happy Song"	71
1973	"Love by Appointment" (with Pati Powell)	99
