= Hello Walls =

Single by Faron Young

from the album Hello Walls
- B-side: "Congratulations"
- Released: March 1961 (U.S.)
- Recorded: January 7, 1961
- Genre: Country
- Length: 2:26
- Label: Capitol
- Songwriter(s): Willie Nelson
- Producer(s): Ken Nelson; Marvin Hughes

Faron Young singles chronology
"Forget the Past" (1960)	"Hello Walls" (1961)	"Backtrack" (1961)

"Hello Walls" is an American country music song written by Willie Nelson and first recorded by Faron Young. It was number one on Billboard's country chart for nine weeks in 1961 and spent 23 weeks on the chart. It peaked at number 12 on the pop chart and was Young's only top-40 pop hit in the United States. Young's recording featured Floyd "Lightnin’" Chance on double bass and The Wilburn Brothers on background vocals.

"Hello Walls" introduced Nelson to a national audience. In 1996, Nelson recorded a rock version of the song with the band The Reverend Horton Heat for the album Twisted Willie.

== Content ==
The lyrics portray a man's lonely conversation with his walls, window and ceiling after having been jilted by his lover.

== Chart performance ==
Chart (1961)	Peak position
U.S. Billboard Hot C&W Sides	1
U.S. Billboard Hot 100	12
U.S. Billboard Easy Listening	13
Australian Kent Music Report	69

== Other notable recordings ==
- Ralph Emery had an answer song called "Hello Fool" in 1961, which peaked at number 4 on the Country Charts. That song was Emery's only hit as a singer.
