= Walk On By (Leroy Van Dyke song) =

Single by Leroy Van Dyke

from the album Walk On By
- B-side: "My World Is Caving In"
- Released: August 1961
- Genre: Country
- Length: 2:19
- Label: Mercury
- Songwriter: Kendall Hayes
- Producer: Shelby Singleton

Leroy Van Dyke singles chronology
"The Auctioneer" (1956)	"Walk On By" (1961)	"If a Woman Answers (Hang Up the Phone)" (1962)

Audio
- "Walk On By" on YouTube

"Walk On By" is a song written by Kendall Hayes and performed by American country music artist Leroy Van Dyke. It was released in June 1961 as the first single and title track from the album Walk On By. The song was Van Dyke's most successful single, spending 37 weeks on the country chart and a record-breaking 19 at the number-one position. "Walk On By" crossed over to the pop chart peaking at number five, and was named by Billboard magazine, in its 100th-anniversary issue (1994), as the biggest country music record in history.

The 19-week run of "Walk On By" is a record that stood for 51 years until "Cruise" by Florida Georgia Line reached its 19th week at number one on July 20, 2013; the following week, "Cruise" surpassed the standard when it recorded its 20th week at the top spot. Until Florida Georgia Line surpassed it in total weeks at number one, "Walk On By" held the record for most weeks at number one since the introduction of the all-encompassing Hot Country Songs (then called Hot C&W Sides) chart in October 1958; the all-time record for most weeks at number one (50 weeks) is the 2017 release "Meant to Be" by Bebe Rexha featuring Florida Georgia Line.

== Synopsis ==
A two-timing man has begun a new relationship, but never fully cut off the previous one. While the old girlfriend is aware of his new flame, the new one does not know about it, and he intends to keep it that way by not acknowledging his old girlfriend in public. He advises the old girlfriend to treat him as a stranger — “just walk on by, wait on the corner” — and that he will continue meeting with her in dim cafes just outside of town.

== Musicians ==
- Leroy Van Dyke – lead vocals
- Margie Singleton — background vocals
- Hank "Sugarfoot" Garland — guitar
- Jerry Kennedy — guitar
- Harold Bradley — guitar
- Kelso Herston — guitar
- Buddy Killen — double bass
- Hargus "Pig" Robbins — piano
- Willie Ackerman — drums

Production staff

- Shelby Singleton — producer
- Mort Thomasson — recording engineer

== Cover versions ==
- Donna Fargo covered the song in 1980. Fargo's version peaked at 43 on the Billboard Hot Country Singles chart. A 1988 cover by Asleep at the Wheel made number 55 on the same chart.
- In 1983, Kikki Danielsson recorded the song on her Singles Bar album.
- Martina McBride covered this song on her 2005 album Timeless.
- Conway Twitty, Dean Martin, Patti Page, Karl Denver, Hank Williams Jr., Kay Starr, Connie Francis, Robert Gordon, and Asleep at the Wheel have also recorded it.
- A Finnish language cover version of this song has the title "Käy Ohitsein", and has been performed and recorded by several artists, including Laila Kinnunen. Another Finnish version, with slightly different lyrics, had the title "Kun Ohi Käyt", and was performed by Irmeli Mäkelä.
- The Swedish language cover version of this song has the title "Du kom för sent", and was recorded by Håkan Stahre.
- The Estonian language cover version of this song has the title "Sa möödu vaid", with lyrics by Heldur Karmo and was recorded by Anu Anton, later by Uno Loop and Heidy Tamme. Song also recorded by Ivo Linna with Rock Hotel. Also some other Estonian artists performed covers with the same title and words.
- In Steven Spielberg's 2022 semiautobiographical film The Fabelmans, the song is performed during the prom scene by the character of Claudia Denning, played by Isabelle Kusman.

== Chart performance ==
=== Leroy Van Dyke ===
Chart (1961–62)	Peak position
New Zealand lever hit parade	5
Norwegian Singles Chart	1
Sweden (Tio i Topp)	1
US Hot Country Songs (Billboard)	1
US Billboard Hot 100	5
UK Singles Chart	5

=== Donna Fargo ===
Chart (1980)	Peak position
US Hot Country Songs (Billboard)	43
Canadian RPM Country Tracks	53

=== Asleep at the Wheel ===
Chart (1988)	Peak position
US Hot Country Songs (Billboard)	55
