= Don't Worry (Marty Robbins song) =

Single by Marty Robbins

from the album More Greatest Hits
- B-side: "Like All the Other Times"
- Released: February 6, 1961
- Recorded: 1960
- Studio: Bradley Studios (Nashville, Tennessee)
- Genre: Country
- Length: 3:15
- Label: Columbia
- Songwriter: Marty Robbins
- Producer: Don Law

Marty Robbins singles chronology
"Five Brothers" (1960)	"Don't Worry" (1961)	"Jimmy Martinez" (1961)

"Don't Worry" is a song written and recorded by American country music artist Marty Robbins. It was released in February 1961 as the third single from his compilation album More Greatest Hits. The song was Robbins' seventh number one on the country chart and stayed at number one for ten weeks. The single crossed over to the pop chart and was one of Marty Robbins' most successful crossover songs, peaking at number three on the Hot 100.

== Background ==
The track has an early example of guitar distortion. A faulty channel in the mixing desk at Bradley Studio B unexpectedly transformed Grady Martin's six-string bass tone in the bridge section and brief reprise right at the end into an unusual distorted sound. Although Martin disliked the sound, Robbins' producer left the guitar track as it was. The effect was eventually reverse-engineered and developed into the Maestro FZ-1 Fuzz-Tone, one of the first guitar pedals, produced by Gibson under the Maestro brand name.

In a 1968 report on sound effects in pop for Beat Instrumental, Crotus Pike believed the effect to be a result of the guitar being "played at a half speed", describing the resulting solo break as exhibiting "the tones of a rich, deep cello–a beautiful sound which no doubt attracted many buyers." He wrote that the effect was the opposite of the use of sped-up instrument solos used in other songs, such as Alan Price Set's "The House That Jack Built" and John Lee Hooker's "Walking the Boogie".

== Chart performance ==
Chart (1961)	Peak position
Canada (CHUM Chart)	6
US Hot Country Songs (Billboard)	1
US Billboard Hot 100	3

== Cover versions ==
- The song was covered by Holly Dunn on her 1990 album, Heart Full of Love.
- The song was covered by LeAnn Rimes on her 1999 album, LeAnn Rimes.
- The song was covered by Jimmie Dale Gilmore on his 2005 album, Come on Back.
