= Auction school =

An auction school is an institution or course of study that prepares an individual to become an auctioneer.

== Requirements ==
Many U.S. states regulate the auction industry, and require that (among other things) an individual attend an approved auction school to obtain a state auctioneer's license.

== Course of study ==
The practice of auctioneering involves more than the well-known auction chant heard at most auctions in the U.S.

In addition to learning the chant, a typical auction school will provide instruction on the legal requirements involved with auctioneering as well as instruction on how to conduct various types of auctions (livestock, real estate, government, etc.) and how to start and operate a successful auction house.
