= Roy Drusky =

American country music singer and songwriter (1930–2004)

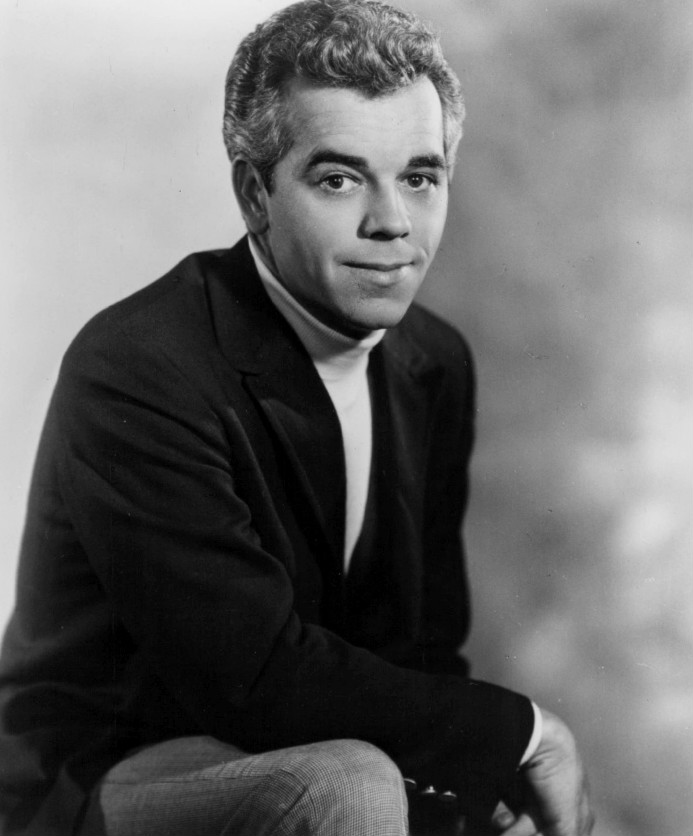
- Drusky in 1969

Background information
- Birth name: Roy Frank Drusky, Jr.
- Born: June 22, 1930; Atlanta, Georgia, U.S.
- Died: September 23, 2004 (aged 74); Portland, Tennessee, U.S.
- Genres: Country music
- Occupation(s): Singer, songwriter
- Instrument: Vocals
- Years active: 1953–2004
- Labels: Starday Records, Columbia Records, Decca Records, Mercury Records, Chapel Records
- Formerly of: Eddy Arnold, Jim Reeves, Priscilla Mitchell

Roy Frank Drusky, Jr. (June 22, 1930 – September 23, 2004) was an American country music singer and songwriter popular from the 1960s through the early 1970s. Known for his baritone voice, he was known for incorporating the Nashville sound and for being one of the first artists to record a song written by Kris Kristofferson ("Jody and the Kid"). His highest-charting single was the number-one "Yes, Mr. Peters", a duet with Priscilla Mitchell.

== Biography ==
=== Early life and career ===
Drusky was born in 1930 in Atlanta, Georgia, United States. His mother, a church organist, had tried for years to get her son into music as a child, but he was focused more on sports, allegedly declining a contract with the Cleveland Indians, then beginning his music career in the early 1950s performing on a Decatur, Georgia, radio station. He began singing while in the US Navy during the 1940s, and later attended Emory University and studied veterinary medicine. During this time, he also played country music with a group he founded, the Southern Ranch Boys.

Drusky also worked as a disc jockey. In 1953, he signed with Starday Records; the first single he released was called "Such a Fool". That same year, he joined the Grand Ole Opry. A few years later, he recorded for Columbia Records, but none of his work gained much success.

=== Work as a songwriter ===
Faron Young, a well-known country singer, helped Drusky's career by recording his songs. Two songs he wrote, "Alone With You" and "Country Girl", Young turned into number-one country hits. After that, Drusky moved on to Decca Records. He also wrote "Anymore", which charted for Teresa Brewer in 1960.

=== Height of his career ===
Drusky charted in Cashbox with "Wait and See" and "Our Church Your Wedding" in 1959.

In 1960, Drusky finally struck it big. At Decca Records, where he worked with producer Owen Bradley, he released a single called "Another", which he co-wrote. Bradley was a well-known producer who had led country singer Patsy Cline to big success in the early 1960s. Bradley helped smooth out Drusky's orchestral tones; the next year, Drusky reached the Country Top 10 with the single "Second Hand Rose".

In 1963, Drusky switched to Mercury Records and released his first hit from his new record company the same year he signed on to it. The song was called "Peel Me a Nanner", which was written by Bill Anderson. He cut several duets with Priscilla Mitchell; one of his biggest hits with her was the number-one hit "Yes, Mr. Peters". During his career, Drusky racked up a number of top-40 Country hits.

Some of his top-40 songs were written by famous singer-songwriters. Liz Anderson wrote "Pick of the Week" for him, as well as "(My Friends Are Gonna Be) Strangers", which is best remembered by the concurrent hit by Merle Haggard, although Drusky's was the more successful record at the time. Kris Kristofferson wrote "Jody and the Kid". Another song, "Red, Red Wine", was written by Neil Diamond.

Drusky appeared on most of the country music television programs of the era, and in 1965, he appeared in the movie White Lightnin' Express and two other films, The Golden Guitar and Four Acre Feud.

=== The 1970s ===
Drusky had his most successful record in several years with 1970's "Long Long Texas Road", a top-five hit. He continued to score several top-40 country hits with the occasional low-charting single.

Drusky's last top-40 country song was a remake of "A Satisfied Mind" in 1973. which had earlier been a hit for both Porter Wagoner and Jean Shepard. He made his last appearance on the Billboard charts in 1974, but occasionally recorded on smaller record labels into the 1990s. He also recorded a number of gospel albums for Chapel Records during this period. He returned to writing and producing music, the latter of which he had done since the 1960s.

Drusky's membership with the Grand Ole Opry ensured him exposure for decades long after the radio hits stopped coming. He appeared regularly on the Grand Ole Opry until the year of his death, singing the hit songs he had racked up in the 1960s and 1970s, in addition to performing country standards from other artists, which became a tradition at the Opry.

=== Death ===
On September 23, 2004, Drusky died at age 74 from complications stemming from lung cancer, which he fought for several years.

=== Personal life ===
Drusky joined the Seventh-day Adventist Church in 1980. He traveled and performed with Kenneth Cox Ministries for 15 years. His wife Bobbye and he had three sons, Roy Frank, III ("Twig"), Tracy Alan ("Tad"), and Darel Bryon ("Tip").

== Discography ==
=== Albums ===
Year	Album	US Country
1961	Anymore with Roy Drusky	—
1962	It's My Way	—
1963	Roy Drusky	—
1964	Songs of the Cities	14
1964	Yesterday's Gone	14
1965	Pick of the Country	11
1965	Country Music All Around the World	18
1965	The Great Roy Drusky Sings	
1966	Roy Drusky's Greatest Hits	7
1966	Together Again (w/ Priscilla Mitchell)	14
1966	In a New Dimension	20
1966	If the Whole World Stopped Lovin'	17
1967	Now Is a Lonely Time	31
1968	Greatest Hits Volume 2	33
1968	Jody and the Kid	27
1969	Portrait of Roy Drusky	33
1969	My Grass Is Green	37
1970	I'll Make Amends	38
1970	The Best of Roy Drusky	42
1970	All My Hard Times	20
1971	I Love the Way You've Been Lovin' Me	3
1976	New Lips	–
1977	Ramblin' Man	–
1979	English Gold	–
1982	Songs Of Willie Nelson	–
1984	Country Sunshine	–

=== Singles ===
Year	Single	Chart Positions		Album
Year	Single	US Country	CAN Country	Album
1960	"Another"	2	—	Anymore with Roy Drusky
1960	"Anymore"	3	—	Anymore with Roy Drusky
1960	"I Can't Tell My Heart That" (with Kitty Wells)	26	—	single only
1961	"Three Hearts in a Tangle"^{A}	2	—	Anymore with Roy Drusky
1961	"I'd Rather Loan You Out"	10	—	Anymore with Roy Drusky
1961	"I Went Out of My Way"	9	—	singles only
1962	"There's Always One (Who Loves a Lot)"	17	—	singles only
1962	"Second Hand Rose"	3	—	singles only
1964	"Peel Me a Nanner"	8	—	singles only
1964	"Pick of the Week"	13	—	Pick of the Country
1964	"Summer, Winter, Spring and Fall"	41	—	singles only
1965	"(From Now On All Of My Friends Are Gonna Be) Strangers"	6	—	singles only
1965	"Yes, Mr. Peters" (with Priscilla Mitchell)	1	—	Love's Eternal Triangle
1965	"White Lightnin' Express"	21	—	Roy Drusky's Greatest Hits
1965	"Slippin' Around" (with Priscilla Mitchell)	45	—	Love's Eternal Triangle
1966	"Rainbows and Roses"	20	—	In a New Dimension
1966	"The World Is Round"	10	—	In a New Dimension
1967	"If the Whole World Stopped Lovin'"	12	—	If the Whole World Stopped Lovin'
1967	"New Lips"	25	—	Now Is a Lonely Time
1967	"Weakness in a Man"	18	—	Greatest Hits Volume 2
1967	"I'll Never Tell on You" (with Priscilla Mitchell)	61	—	single only
1968	"You Better Sit Down Kids"	26	21	Jody and the Kid
1968	"Jody and the Kid"	24	9	Jody and the Kid
1968	"Where the Blue and Lonely Go"	10	16	Portrait of Roy Drusky
1968	"My Grass Is Green"	14	—	My Grass Is Green
1969	"Such a Fool"	7	42	My Grass Is Green
1969	"I'll Make Amends"	11	33	I'll Make Amends
1970	"Long Long Texas Road"	5	4	I'll Make Amends
1970	"All My Hard Times"	9	12	All My Hard Times
1971	"I Love the Way That You've Been Lovin' Me"	15	25	I Love the Way That You've Been Lovin' Me
1971	"I Can't Go On Lovin' You"	37	—	I Love the Way That You've Been Lovin' Me
1971	"Red Red Wine"	17	16	I Must Be Doin' Something Right
1972	"Sunshine and Rainbows"	58	—	I Must Be Doin' Something Right
1972	"The Last Time I Called Somebody Darlin'"	25	63	I Must Be Doin' Something Right
1973	"I Must Be Doin' Something Right"	32	60	I Must Be Doin' Something Right
1973	"That Rain Makin' Baby of Mine"	50	65	I Must Be Doin' Something Right
1973	"Satisfied Mind"	25	38	singles only
1974	"Close to Home"	81	—	singles only
1974	"Dixie Lily"	45	—	Peaceful Easy Feeling
1976	"Night Flying"	81	—	Night Flying
1977	"Betty's Song"	91	—	single only

- ^{A}"Three Hearts in a Tangle" also peaked at number 35 on the Billboard Hot 100.
