= Leroy Van Dyke =

American singer-songwriter (born 1929)

- Born: Leroy Frank Van Dyke; October 4, 1929 (age 97); Mora, Missouri, U.S.
- Genres: Country; honky-tonk; rockabilly
- Occupations: Singer; guitarist; auctioneer
- Instruments: Vocals; guitar
- Years active: 1956–present
- Labels: Dot; Mercury
- Website: www.leroyvandyke.com

Leroy Frank Van Dyke (born October 4, 1929) is an American country music and honky-tonk singer and guitarist, best known for his hits "The Auctioneer" (1956) and "Walk On By" (1961).

== Biography ==
Van Dyke was born in Mora, Missouri, and graduated from the University of Missouri, majoring in agricultural journalism, as well as being a member of FarmHouse Fraternity. He was catapulted into country music fame in 1956 with his composition "The Auctioneer", which sold over 2.5 million records. He wrote the song about the life of his cousin, National Auctioneers Association Hall of Famer Ray Sims, also a Missourian. Van Dyke had the lead role of a budding country music performer in the 1967 movie What Am I Bid? in which Sims played himself as an auctioneer.

In his 50 year-plus career, Van Dyke has recorded more than 500 songs, dozens of them making the charts. His record of "Walk On By" (1961) was named by Billboard magazine in 1994 as the biggest country single of all time, based on sales, plays, and weeks in the charts. It stayed at number one in the U.S. country chart for 19 weeks, and in all, charted for 42 weeks, reaching number five on the pop listings. It sold more than 1.5 million copies.

Other Van Dyke hits were "If a Woman Answers", "Black Cloud", "Big Man in a Big House", "Anne of a Thousand Days", "Happy to Be Unhappy", "Night People", "Be a Good Girl", "Dim Dark Corner", "Five Steps Away", "How Long Must You Keep Me a Secret", "Afraid of a Heartache", "Big Wide Wonderful World of Country Music", "Birmingham", "Just a State of Mind", "Mr. Professor", "My World Is Caving In", "The Other Boys Are Talking", "Poor Guy", "Roses from a Stranger", "Texas Tea", "Who’s Gonna Run the Truck Stop in Tuba City When I’m Gone", "Wrong Side of the Tracks", "Your Daughter Cried All Night", "Your Money", and "The Life You Offered Me".

In the UK Singles Chart Van Dyke had two hits: "Walk On By" reached number five in February 1962, and "Big Man in a Big House" made number 34 in May that year.

He was a cast member in the late 1950s on Ozark Jubilee, and was co-host, with Bill Mack, of the Southern Baptist Radio/TV Commission-produced Country Crossroads radio show for 10 years, and was joined by a third co-host Jerry Clower. It became the most widely syndicated radio show in country music history.

Van Dyke continues a performance schedule, traveling from his office/home complex on his 1,000-acre (4 km^{2}) ranch in west-central Missouri near Sedalia. He is a member of the National Auctioneers Association Hall of Fame, is active in many music industry organizations, and as a sideline, raises premium quality Arabian mules. All aspects of Leroy Van Dyke Enterprises are managed by his wife Gladys, a former legal secretary and court reporter. Their son Ben plays lead guitar in all Van Dyke performances. Van Dyke is also a Korean War veteran.

== Discography ==
=== Albums ===
Year	Album	Label
1962	Walk On By	Mercury
1962	Movin' Van Dyke	Mercury
1963	The Great Hits	Mercury
1964	Songs for Mom and Dad	Mercury
1964	At the Trade Winds	Mercury
1965	Out of Love	Wing
1965	Walk On By	Mt. Dew
1965	The Leroy Van Dyke Show	Warner Bros.
1966	Country Hits	Warner Bros.
1966	Movin	Wing
1966	Auctioneer	Dot
1967	Have a Party	Mt. Dew
1967	What Am I Bid	MGM
1968	Lonesome Is	Kapp
1969	Greatest Hits	Kapp
1969	Just a Closer Walk with Thee	Kapp
1969	I've Never Been Loved Before	Harmony
1972	Greatest Hits	Decca
1973	Golden Hits	Sun
1975	Just for You	Dot
1977	Gospel Greats	Plantation
1978	Rock Relics	Plantation
1982	Cross Section	Audiograph
1983	Audiograph Live	Audiograph

=== Singles ===
Year	Single	Chart Positions		Album
Year	Single	US Country	US	Album
1956	"The Auctioneer"	9	19	single only
1961	"Walk On By"	1	5	Walk On By
1962	"If a Woman Answers (Hang Up the Phone)"	3	35	Movin' Van Dyke
1962	"Black Cloud"	16		The Great Hits
1964	"Happy to Be Unhappy"	54		singles only
1964	"Night People"	45		singles only
1965	"Anne of a Thousand Days"	40		singles only
1966	"You Couldn't Get My Love Back (if You Tried)"		120	singles only
1966	"Roses from a Stranger"	34		I've Never Been Loved Before
1967	"I've Never Been Loved"	66		I've Never Been Loved Before
1968	"Louisville"	23		I've Never Been Loved Before
1968	"You May Be Too Much for Memphis, Baby"	69		Lonesome Is
1969	"Crack in My World"	56		singles only
1970	"An Old Love Affair, Now Showing"	63		singles only
1970	"Mister Professor"	71		singles only
1971	"I Get Lonely When It Rains"	62		singles only
1972	"I'd Rather Be Wantin' Love"	69		singles only
1975	"Unfaithful Fools"	79		singles only
1976	"Who's Gonna Run the Truck Stop in Tuba City When I'm Gone?"	75		singles only
1977	"Texas Tea"	77		singles only

== Awards ==
In 1967, Leroy Van Dyke was awarded the Founding President's Award (formerly Connie B. Gay Award) from the Country Music Association.
