= Faron Young =

American country singer (1932–1996)

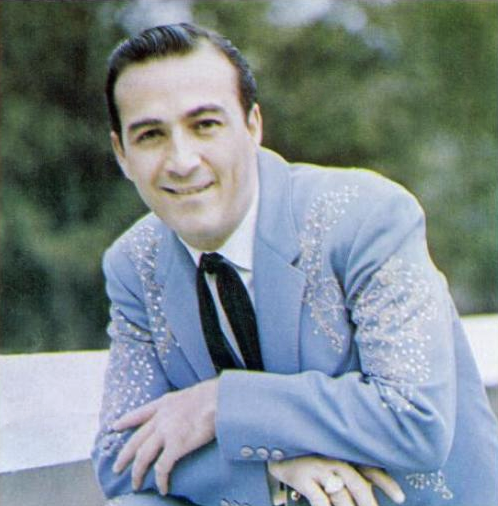
- Young in 1964

Background information
- Also known as: The Hillbilly Heartthrob; The Singing Sheriff; The Young Sheriff
- Born: Faron Young; February 25, 1932; Shreveport, Louisiana, U.S.
- Died: December 10, 1996 (aged 64) Nashville, Tennessee, U.S.
- Genres: Country; honky-tonk
- Occupations: Musician, singer-songwriter, actor
- Instrument: Guitar
- Years active: 1951–1994
- Labels: Gotham, Capitol, Mercury, MCA, Step One

Faron Young (February 25, 1932 – December 10, 1996) was an American country singer, musician, and songwriter from the early 1950s into the mid-1980s. His hits including "If You Ain't Lovin' (You Ain't Livin')" and "Live Fast, Love Hard, Die Young" marked him as a honky-tonk singer in sound and personal style; and his chart-topping singles "Hello Walls" and "It's Four in the Morning" showed his versatility as a vocalist.

Known as the "Hillbilly Heartthrob", and following a singing cowboy film role as the "Young Sheriff", Young's singles charted for more than 30 years.

In failing health, he died by suicide at the age of 64 in 1996. Young is a member of the Country Music Hall of Fame.

== Early years ==
Young was born in Shreveport, Louisiana, the youngest of six children of Harlan and Doris Young. He grew up on a dairy farm his family operated outside the city.

Young began singing at an early age, imagining a career as a pop singer, but after he joined some friends watching Hank Williams perform with nine encores on the Louisiana Hayride, Young switched to country music, instead. He performed at the local Optimist Club and was discovered by Webb Pierce, who brought him to star on the Louisiana Hayride in 1951, then broadcast on KWKH-AM.

He graduated from Fair Park High School that year and attended Centenary College of Louisiana.

== Career ==
Young recorded in Shreveport. His first releases were on Philadelphia's Gotham Records. By February 1952, he was signed to Capitol Records, where he recorded for the next 10 years. His first Capitol single appeared that spring.

Young moved to Nashville and recorded his first chart hit, "Goin' Steady", in October 1952. His career was sidetracked when he was drafted into the United States Army the following month. "Goin' Steady" hit the Billboard country chart while Young was in basic training. It peaked at number two, and the US Army Band took Young to replace Eddie Fisher on tours—its first country music singer—just as "If You Ain't Lovin'" was hitting the chart. He was discharged in November 1954 and returned to Nashville.

From 1954 to 1962, Young recorded many honky-tonk songs for Capitol, including the first hit version of Don Gibson's "Sweet Dreams". Most famous was "Hello Walls", a Willie Nelson song Young turned into a crossover hit in 1961. It sold over one million copies, and was awarded a gold disc.

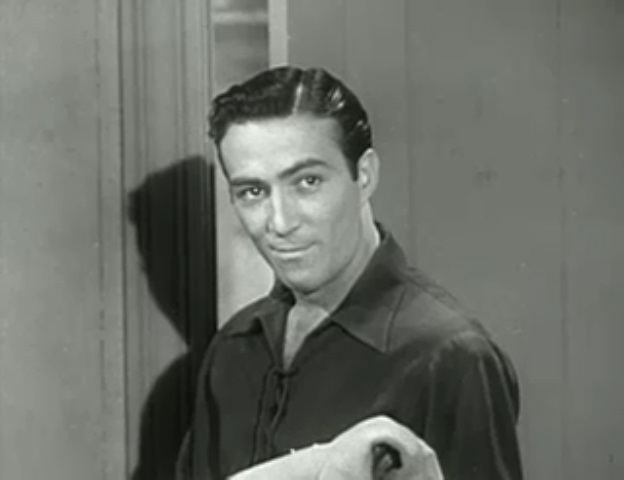
Faron Young in Raiders of Old California (1957)

During the mid-1950s, Young starred in four low-budget films: Hidden Guns, Daniel Boone, Trail Blazer, Raiders of Old California, and Country Music Holiday. He appeared as himself in cameo roles and performances in later country music films and was a frequent guest on television shows throughout his career, including ABC-TV's Ozark Jubilee. His band, the Country Deputies, was one of country music's top bands who toured for many years. He invested in real estate along Nashville's Music Row in the 1960s, and in 1963, co-founded, with Preston Temple, the trade magazine, Music City News.

The same year, Young switched to Mercury Records and drifted musically, but by the end of the decade, he had returned to his sound, including "Wine Me Up". Released in 1971, the waltz-time ballad "It's Four in the Morning", written by Jerry Chesnut, was one of Young's best records and his last number-one hit, also becoming his only major success in the United Kingdom, where it peaked at number three on the UK Singles Chart.

By the mid-1970s, his records were becoming overshadowed by his behavior, making headlines in 1972, when he was charged with assault for spanking a girl in the audience at a concert in Clarksburg, West Virginia, whom he claimed spat on him, and for other later incidents. In the mid-1970s, Young was the spokesman for BC Powder.

Young signed with MCA Records in 1979; the association lasted two years. Nashville independent label Step One Records signed him in 1988, where he recorded into the early 1990s (including a duet album with Ray Price), then withdrew from public view. Although country acts including BR549 were putting his music before audiences in the mid-1990s, Young apparently felt the music industry, which had undergone a revolution of sorts in 1991, had mostly rejected him.

Faron Young's son Robyn followed him into the country music business starting in 1975. Robyn was the main headliner at his father's night club, Faron Young's Jailhouse. In the early 1980s, Robyn began touring with his father, performing as an opening act.

== Personal life ==
Young briefly dated Billie Jean Jones before she became the second wife of country music superstar Hank Williams. Jones met Williams through Young; they went on to wed in October 1952.

In 1952, while Young was stationed at Fort McPherson, he met his future wife, Hilda Macon, the daughter of an Army master sergeant and the great-granddaughter of Uncle Dave Macon. The couple married two years later in November 1954 after Young was discharged from the Army. They had four children, sons Damion, Robyn, and Kevin, and a daughter Alana.

Young's later life was plagued with bouts of depression and alcoholism. In 1972, Young was arrested and charged with assault for spanking a girl in the audience at a concert in Clarksburg, West Virginia, after claiming she spat on him. Young appeared before a Wood County, West Virginia, justice of the peace and was fined $24, plus $11 in court costs. On the night of December 4, 1984, Young fired a pistol into the kitchen ceiling of his Harbor Island home. When he refused to seek help for his drinking problem, Young and his wife Hilda separated, sold their home, and bought individual houses. When asked at the divorce trial if he feared hurting someone by shooting holes into the ceiling, Young answered "Not whatsoever." The couple divorced after 34 years of marriage in 1987.

A combination of feeling he had been abandoned by country music, and despondency over his deteriorating health, were cited as possible reasons as to why Young shot himself on December 9, 1996, then died in Nashville the following day. He was later cremated. His ashes were spread by his family over Old Hickory Lake outside Nashville at Johnny Cash and June Carter Cash's home while the Cashes were away.

== Legacy ==
- In 2000, Young was inducted into the Country Music Hall of Fame.
- The cat owned by Peanuts character Frieda was named "Faron" after Young, whom Charles Schulz "admired very much," but made few appearances in the strip.
- A live performance video clip of Young's "It's Four in the Morning" was the first music video to air on CMT when it launched on March 6, 1983.
- A country song by Tex Garrison mentions Faron Young in his opening lyrics with the lines "Got a stack of records when I was one, listened to Hank Williams and Faron Young."
- The Bottle Rockets make a wistful reference to Young in their song "Sometimes Found" on their album Brand New Year.
- Prefab Sprout recorded a country-tinged song called "Faron Young" on their album Steve McQueen. The chorus repeats the line "You give me Faron Young four in the morning". The track reached number 74 in the UK Singles Chart.
- Faron's hits "Hello Walls" and "Alone with You" make brief appearances in the movie biography 3: The Dale Earnhardt Story.
- The Blazing Zoos' song "Still Up at Five" on their album Chocks Away is a sequel/homage to "It's Four in the Morning."
- "I Miss You Already" can be heard in the 2005 Johnny Cash movie biography Walk the Line.

== CD reissues ==
=== Box sets ===
In 2012, the UK-based Jasmine Records released a budget-minded two-CD box set entitled Live Fast, Love Hard, Die Young: The Early Album Collection. The set focused on Young's first four albums. Later in 2012, Real Gone Music released a similar compilation, which combined Young's first six albums with key singles.

Two years before Young's death, German independent record label Bear Family Records released a box set entitled The Classic Years 1952–1962, which showcased Young's early recordings for Capitol. It did not include Young's recordings for Mercury or Step One.

Young's final recordings were released on a CD entitled Are You Hungry? Eat Your Import by the record label Showboat Records, which was founded by fellow country music star Liz Anderson.

== Discography ==
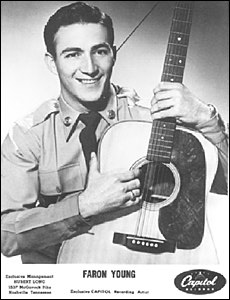
Capitol Records promotional photo

=== Albums ===
Year	Album	US Country	Label
1957	Sweethearts or Strangers	—	Capitol T-778
1958	The Object of My Affection	—	Capitol T-1004
1959	This Is Faron Young!	—	Capitol T-1096
1959	My Garden of Prayer	—	Capitol T-1185
1959	Talk About Hits!	—	Capitol T-1245
1960	Faron Young Sings the Best of Faron Young	—	Capitol ST-1450
1961	Hello Walls	—	Capitol ST-1528
1961	The Young Approach	—	Capitol ST-1634
1963	All Time Greatest Hits	—	Capitol DT-2037
1963	This Is Faron	—	Mercury SR-60785
1963	Aims at the West	11	Mercury SR-60840
1964	Story Songs for Country Folks	7	Mercury SR-60896
1964	Country Dance Favorites	7	Mercury SR-60931
1964	Story Songs of Mountains and Valleys	—	Mercury SR-60931
1965	Pen and Paper	—	Mercury SR-61007
1965	Greatest Hits	—	Mercury SR-61047
1966	Sings the Songs of Jim Reeves	18	Mercury SR-61058
1967	Unmitigated Gall	18	Mercury SR-61110
1968	Greatest Hits Vol. 2	24	Mercury SR-61143
1968	Here's Faron Young	35	Mercury SR-61174
1969	I've Got Precious Memories	38	Mercury SR-61212
1969	Wine Me Up	13	Mercury SR-61241
1970	The Best of Faron Young	45	Mercury SR-61267
1970	Occasional Wife	31	Mercury SR-61275
1971	Step Aside	19	Mercury SR-61337
1971	Leavin' and Sayin' Goodbye	23	Mercury SR-61354
1972	Its Four in the Morning	11	Mercury SR-61359
1972	This Little Girl of Mine	17	Mercury SR-61364
1973	This Time the Hurtin's on Me	19	Mercury SR-61376
1973	Just What I Had in Mind	26	Mercury SRM1-674
1974	Some Kind of a Woman	25	Mercury SRM1-698
1974	A Man and His Music	45	Mercury SRM1-1016
1976	I'd Just Be Fool Enough	—	Mercury SRM1-1075
1977	The Best of Faron Young Vol. 2	32	Mercury SRM1-1130
1978	That Young Feelin'	—	Mercury SRM1-5005
1979	Chapter Two	—	MCA 3092
1980	Free and Easy	—	MCA 3212
1983	Faron Young's Black Tie Country	—	51 West Q 16296
1987	Funny How Time Slips Away (with Willie Nelson)	—	Columbia FC 39484
1987	Here's to You	—	Step One SOR 0040
1987	Greatest Hits 1–3	—	Step One SOR 43/44/45
1988	Country Christmas	—	Step One SOP 0059
1990	Memories That Last (with Ray Price)	—	Step One SOP 0068
1993	Live in Branson	—	Laserlight 12137

=== Singles ===
Year	Single	Chart positions				Album
Year	Single	US Country	US	AU	CAN Country	Album
1951	"Hot Rod Shot Gun Boogie No 2"	—	—	—	—	singles only
1952	"You're Just Imagination"	—	—	—	—	singles only
1952	"I Heard the Juke Box Playing"	—	—	—	—	singles only
1952	"Tattle Tale Tears"	—	—	—	—	This Is Faron Young
1952	"Foolish Pride"	—	—	—	—	singles only
1952	"Saving My Tears for Tomorrow"	—	—	—	—	singles only
1952	"Goin' Steady"	2	—	—	—	This Is Faron Young
1953	"I Can't Wait (For the Sun to Go Down)"	5	—	—	—	singles only
1953	"That's What I'd Do for You"	—	—	—	—	singles only
1953	"I'm Gonna Tell Santa Claus on You"	—	—	—	—	singles only
1953	"Just Married"	—	—	—	—	This Is Faron Young
1954	"They Made Me Fall in Love with You"	—	—	—	—	singles only
1954	"A Place for Girls Like You"	8	—	—	—	singles only
1954	"If You Ain't Lovin' (You Ain't Livin')"	2	—	—	—	This Is Faron Young
1955	"Live Fast, Love Hard, Die Young"	1	—	—	—	This Is Faron Young
1955	"God Bless God"	—	—	—	—	singles only
1955	"Go Back, You Fool"	11	—	—	—	singles only
1955	"It's a Great Life (If You Don't Weaken)"	5	—	—	—	This Is Faron Young
1956	"I've Got Five Dollars and It's Saturday Night"	4	—	—	—	This Is Faron Young
1956	"Sweet Dreams"	2	—	—	—	This Is Faron Young
1956	"Turn Her Down"	9	—	—	—	singles only
1956	"I Miss You Already (And You're Not Even Gone)"	5	—	—	—	singles only
1957	"The Shrine of St. Cecilia"	15	96	—	—	singles only
1957	"Love Has Finally Come My Way"	12	—	—	—	singles only
1957	"Vacation's Over"	—	—	—	—	singles only
1957	"Locket"	—	—	—	—	singles only
1958	"I Can't Dance"	—	—	—	—	singles only
1958	"Alone with You"	1	51	—	—	Sings the Best
1958	"That's the Way I Feel"	9	—	—	—	singles only
1958	"Last Night at a Party"	20	—	—	—	singles only
1959	"That's the Way It's Gotta Be"	14	—	—	—	Sings the Best
1959	"Country Girl"	1	—	—	—	Sings the Best
1959	"Riverboat"	4	83	—	—	Sings the Best
1960	"Your Old Used to Be"	5	—	—	—	Sings the Best
1960	"There's Not Any Like You Left"	21	—	—	—	Hello Walls
1960	"Forget the Past"	20	—	—	—	Hello Walls
1961	"Hello Walls"	1	12	69	—	Hello Walls
1961	"Backtrack"	8	89	70	—	The Young Approach
1962	"Three Days"	7	—	—	—	The Young Approach
1962	"The Comeback"	4	—	—	—	single only
1962	"Down by the River"	9	—	—	—	All Time Greatest Hits
1963	"The Yellow Bandana"	4	114	65	—	This Is Faron
1963	"I've Come to Say Goodbye"	30	—	—	—	This Is Faron
1963	"We've Got Something in Common"	13	—	—	—	This Is Faron
1963	"You'll Drive Me Back (Into Her Arms Again)"	10	—	—	—	singles only
1964	"Keeping Up with the Joneses" (with Margie Singleton)	5	—	—	—	singles only
1964	"Old Courthouse"	48	—	—	—	Story Songs for Country Folks
1964	"Another Woman's Man – Another Man's Woman" (with Margie Singleton)	38	—	—	—	single only
1964	"My Friend on the Right"	11	—	—	—	Story Songs of Mountains and Valleys
1965	"Walk Tall"	10	—	—	—	Greatest Hits
1965	"Nothing Left to Lose"	34	—	—	—	Greatest Hits
1965	"My Dreams"	14	—	—	—	Unmitigated Gall
1966	"You Don't Treat Me Right"	—	—	—	—	Unmitigated Gall
1966	"Unmitigated Gall"	7	—	—	—	Unmitigated Gall
1967	"I Guess I Had Too Much to Dream Last Night"	48	—	—	—	Unmitigated Gall
1967	"Wonderful World of Women"	14	—	—	—	Greatest Hits Vol. 2
1968	"She Went a Little Bit Farther"	14	—	—	32	Here's Faron Young
1968	"I Just Came to Get My Baby"	8	—	—	1	Here's Faron Young
1969	"I've Got Precious Memories"	25	—	—	—	I've Got Precious Memories
1969	"Wine Me Up"	2	—	—	3	Wine Me Up
1969	"Your Time's Coming"	4	—	—	—	Wine Me Up
1970	"Occasional Wife"	6	—	—	15	Occasional Wife
1970	"If I Ever Fall in Love (With a Honky Tonk Girl)"	4	—	—	2	Occasional Wife
1970	"Goin' Steady"	5	—	—	8	Step Aside
1971	"Step Aside"	6	—	—	11	Step Aside
1971	"Leavin' and Sayin' Goodbye"	9	—	—	11	Leavin' and Sayin' Goodbye
1971	"It's Four in the Morning"	1	92	9	1	It's Four in the Morning
1972	"This Little Girl of Mine"	5	—	—	3	This Little Girl of Mine
1972	"Woman's Touch"	—	—	—	—	This Little Girl of Mine
1973	"She Fights That Lovin' Feeling"	15	—	—	6	This Time The Hurtin's on Me
1973	"Just What I Had in Mind"	9	—	—	9	Just What I Had in Mind
1974	"Some Kind of a Woman"	8	—	—	6	Some Kind of a Woman
1974	"The Wrong in Loving You"	20	—	—	22	Some Kind of a Woman
1974	"Another You"	23	—	—	—	A Man and His Music
1975	"Here I Am in Dallas"	16	—	—	49	The Best of Faron Young Vol. 2
1975	"Feel Again"	21	—	—	15	The Best of Faron Young Vol. 2
1976	"I'd Just Be Fool Enough"	33	—	—	—	I'd Just Be Fool Enough
1976	"(The Worst You Ever Gave Me Was) The Best I Ever Had"	30	—	—	—	The Best of Faron Young Vol. 2
1977	"Crutches"	25	—	—	—	That Young Feelin'
1978	"Loving Here and Living There and Lying in Between"	38	—	—	—	That Young Feelin'
1979	"The Great Chicago Fire"	67	—	—	30	Chapter Two
1979	"That Over Thirty Look"	69	—	—	68	Chapter Two
1980	"(If I'd Only Known) It Was the Last Time"	56	—	—	74	Free and Easy
1980	"Tearjoint"	72	—	—	—	singles only
1981	"Until the Bitter End"	88	—	—	—	singles only
1981	"Pull Up a Pillow"	—	—	—	—	singles only
1982	"He Stopped Loving Her Today"	—	—	—	—	"Black Tie Country"
1988	"Stop and Take the Time"	100	—	—	—	
1988	"Here's to You"	87	—	—	—	
1989	"It's Four in the Morning"	—	—	—	—	Greatest Hits 1–3
1991	"Just an Ol' Heartache"	—	—	—	—	single only
1992	"Memories That Last" (with Ray Price)	—	—	—	—	Memories That Last
1992	"Too Big to Fight" (with Ray Price)	—	—	—	—	Memories That Last
1992	"Christmas Song"	—	—	—	—	Country Christmas

=== B-sides ===
Year	B-side	US Country	Original A-side
1955	"Forgive Me, Dear"	flip	"Live Fast, Love Hard, Die Young"
1955	"All Right"	2	"Go Back, You Fool"
1955	"For the Love of a Woman Like You"	flip	"It's a Great Life (If You Don't Weaken)"
1956	"You're Still Mine"	3	"I've Got Five Dollars and It's Saturday Night"
1956	"Until I Met You"	flip	"Sweet Dreams"
1956	"I'll Be Satisfied with Love"	flip	"Turn Her Down"
1957	"I'm Gonna Live Some Before I Die"	flip	"I Miss You Already (And You're Not Even Gone)"
1958	"Every Time I'm Kissing You"	10	"Alone with You"
1958	"I Hate Myself"	22	"That's the Way I Feel"
1958	"A Long Time Ago"	16	"Last Night at a Party"
1959	"I Hear You Talkin'"	27	"Country Girl"
1959	"Face to the Wall"	10	"Riverboat"
1960	"A World So Full of Love"	28	"Forget the Past"
1961	"Congratulations"	28	"Hello Walls"
1963	"Nightmare"	14	"I've Come to Say Goodbye"
1964	"No Thanks, I Just Had One" (with Margie Singleton)	40	"Keeping Up with the Joneses"
1964	"Rhinestones"	23	"Old Courthouse"
1979	"Second Hand Emotion"	70	"That Over Thirty Look"

=== Guest singles ===
Year	Single	Artist	Peak chart positions	Album
Year	Single	Artist	US Country	Album
1985	"One Big Family"	Heart of Nashville	61	single only

=== Music videos ===
Year	Video	Director
1985	"One Big Family" (Heart of Nashville)	Steve Von Hagel

== Filmography ==
- 1956 Hidden Guns
- 1956 Daniel Boone, Trail Blazer
- 1957 Raiders of Old California
- 1958 Country Music Holiday
- 1966 Second Fiddle to a Steel Guitar
- 1966 Nashville Rebel
- 1967 What Am I Bid?
- 1967 The Road to Nashville
- 1977 That's Country

== Film depiction ==
Actor Fred Parker Jr. portrayed Young in the biopic I Saw the Light, released on March 25, 2016.
