= Chandler Travis =

American musician and producer

- Born: Peter Chandler Travis; March 15, 1950 (age 76); New York City, US
- Occupations: Musician, singer, songwriter, record producer
- Instruments: Guitar, Vocals, Bass
- Years active: 1969–present
- Labels: Iddy Biddy, Akers Records, Boss Sounds, Demon Records, Eat Records, Just Like Real, Red Rooster Records, Rounder Records, Sonic Trout, Target Earth Records
- Website: chandlertravis.com

Peter Chandler Travis (born March 15, 1950) is an American musician, songwriter, producer and owner of Iddy Biddy record label. Travis plays many unique styles of music sometimes labeled as an "alternative Dixieland," though it is difficult to classify into genres. His career began with the comedic songwriting duo started with Steve Shook, Travis Shook and the Club Wow, which worked closely with top comedians of the time like George Carlin and Martin Mull. Travis co-founded Sonic Trout Records with Chris Blood and later created his own record company, Iddy Biddy. He has toured across America, Europe and Japan, and has developed a Japanese fan-base leading to several of Travis' albums being released on Japanese labels.

Travis created The Cape Cod Christmas Cavalcades for the Homeless and The Boston Christmas Cavalcades for the Homeless, annual fundraisers benefiting various organizations, and is the musical director for The Boston charity. Travis has written articles and reviews for New England publications as himself and under the byline Thurston Kelp.

== Personal life ==
Chandler Travis was born in New York City and his family moved to Connecticut when he was a child. His father worked as a textile salesman, his mother condensed books for Reader's Digest and his sister, Deborah Travis, is a nurse. Travis was influenced by jazz music from a young age; Duke Ellington, Ella Fitzgerald, Count Basie, and Ray Charles were among his favorite musicians, and he began playing guitar at the age of 13. In Connecticut, he attended prep schools (Taft, along with Steve Shook; and Forman School.) At Forman, Travis played guitar in a garage band that played from 1966-1968 called The Good Fairies, later renamed The St. James Infirmary. He played his first show at a coffee house at age 15, and had his first paying gig at age 16.

Travis has been a Cape Cod resident since the early 1970s. He continues performing, mostly in small New England venues, as a lead member of the Chandler Travis Philharmonic, the Chandler Travis Three-O, the Chandler Travis Philharmonette, and the Catbirds.

== Travis, Shook and the Club Wow ==
Travis moved to Boston to attend Boston University. There he became friends with Steve Shook and the two formed the acoustic-comedy group Travis, Shook and the Club Wow, in 1969. The group wrote folk-rock music with comedic, whimsical lyrics, and created several recurring characters. They quickly gained popularity playing shows at campuses across the Northeast United States, and were opened for by artists such as Bruce Springsteen, and the E Street Band. They appeared on The Dick Cavett Show, The Tonight Show Starring Johnny Carson, and The Midnight Special. In 1972 the group released their only contemporaneous full-length album, The Essential Travis, Shook and the Club Wow, along with several other musicians including members of NRBQ. Tom Staley, the drummer from NRBQ, joined them on tour for a period of time, as did Rikki Bates (also performed as Vince Valium, formerly known as Rich Bates) who has been a frequent drummer in Travis' collaborations ever since.

=== Touring with George Carlin ===
Starting July 29, 1971, they were booked as the opening act for Dave Van Ronk for a three-day set at a coffee house in Bryn Mawr, Pennsylvania, called The Main Point. Van Ronk had to cancel last minute and the club owner called in George Carlin, who had opened a series of shows at the same venue earlier that month, as an emergency replacement headliner. Travis and Shook nearly missed the set, being detained by police en route to the show for marijuana possession which the police confiscated; however, they did not find several tablets of MDA (a drug similar to MDMA) which the duo shared with Carlin, who smoked marijuana with them in return. After the set Carlin was so impressed with the group that he signed them as his opening act, and they toured with him until 1981, including a performance at Carnegie Hall in 1974.

Carlin appeared on several tracks released by the Chandler Travis Philharmonic, such as "Tarnation", a track made from a blethering voicemail Carlin left Travis spoken in alien-mimicking phrases. They continued working together until Carlin's death in 2008. Travis wrote and recorded the theme songs for The George Carlin Show, and Carlin's TV pilot, Apt. 2c, and wrote two additional songs for the show performed by Brian Doyle-Murray.

== The Incredible Casuals ==
Travis and Shook met with drummer Rikki (Rich) Bates in 1978 and began working on a new, more serious band focused on pop-rock. Originally with Eric Rosenfeld on the guitar they went by the name The Susan Anton People; they were joined by Johnny Spampinato a couple of years later and became The Incredible Casuals. After a couple of singles, the "Let'S Go Summer Fun Maxi-EP" was released in 1982. Shook then left the group and was later replaced by Aaron Spade. In 1983 and '84, the group produced a monthly mail-order cassette subscription called the Inedible Casserole series in which they recorded and released a new album every other month. The Casuals played at a club called the Wellfleet Beachcomber in Wellfleet for 35 years every Sunday during summer months. Spampinato joined NRBQ in 1994; however, the Casuals continued to play part-time while their members focused on other projects for over 20 years until 2014.

Over the years, The Casuals were joined on stage by guest singers, including their soundman, Chris Blood, who had a recurring feature as "The White Prince," performing unusually inept covers of classic songs, with the Casuals credited as the Brain Bats of Venus, and they have released two albums on Sonic Trout Records: You've Got a Friend: The White Prince Story, and Resurrection!

== Chandler Travis Philharmonic ==
In 1996, the house band of the Lizard Lounge in Cambridge, Massachusetts, was a rhythm section led by Dinty Child. The club had a guest position that rotated weekly; Child was joined by Travis for one of these positions and by Travis' suggestion Child recruited a full brass section, leading to the formation of Chandler Travis Philharmonic. The Lizard Lounge resident band position was next filled by Session Americana.

Travis has created two smaller versions of the Philharmonic: the Chandler Travis Three-O, and the Chandler Travis Philharmonette; each group mostly plays different material with unique styles. The groups are known for regularly performing in brightly colored pajamas, smoking jackets, and hats. The Philharmonic in particular is a high-energy, theatrical group, often engaging with the audience in quirky ways during their performances like the way they present their tip jar; it is taped to a Roomba robot vacuum and roams the audience randomly and was dubbed the Honey Bunny 6000 by its inventor, trumpetist Kami Lyle.

The Philharmonic usually consists of nine members, currently, Chandler Travis (guitar/vocals), Alex Brander (drums), John Clark (upright bass), Fred Boak (vocals), Cliff Spencer (keyboards), Dinty Child (mandocello/mandolin/accordion/cello), and their three-piece horn section known as The June Trailer Dancers; Berke McKelvey (clarinets/saxophones/keys), Kami Lyle (trumpet), and Bob Pilkington (trombone).

Fred Boak (also known as "The Valet") was a longtime fan of the group before joining them. After befriending the group he began selling their merchandise at shows and managing Travis' website. Boak became a harmony singer with the Philharmonic's many versions around 2001 when he was called in as a last-minute substitute, and now performs regularly, although he describes his role as “being on stage, with a drink in my hand, looking good.” Boak replaced Travis as the musical director of The Cape Cod Christmas Cavalcades for the Homeless in 2018.

== Chandler Travis Three-O ==
Chandler Travis Three-O is a quartet that was created to play smaller venues than Chandler Travis Philharmonic, it being difficult to find venues with the budget and stage-space to fulfill the Philharmonic's needs. Although they have rearranged songs from the Philharmonic to work with the quartet, there is enough material that the Three-O has quite a different repertoire from the Philharmonic, and they have released two albums. The scaled-down group is: Chandler Travis (guitar/vocals), Fred Boak (vocals), John Clark (upright bass), Berke McKelvey (saxes/clarinets/keyboards), and sometimes Kami Lyle (trumpet, vocals).

== The Catbirds ==
The Catbirds are a simple guitar/bass/drums quartet, play rootsier, louder rock, a bit closer to the Casuals in style than any of Travis's other current groups. They've released a couple of EPs and 2012's full-length "Catbirds Say Yeah". The Catbirds' current lineup is: Travis (bass/vocals), Steve Wood (guitar/vocals), Mark Usher (guitarist) and Sam Wood (drums).

== Discography ==
=== Travis Shook and the Club Wow ===
Year	Album
1974	Essential Travis Shook and the Club Wow
1974	It's Not Too Late (single)
2000	Weekend on Mt. Cod (Radio Ball #14)

=== The Incredible Casuals ===
Year	Album
1981	Money Won't Buy You Happiness (single)
1981	That's Why (single)
1982	Picnic Ape (single)
1982	Let's Go (EP)
1983	hi there. (Inedible Casserole #1)
1983	New Hats for Summer (Inedible Casserole #2)
1983	There Goes 5 Dollars (Inedible Casserole #3)
1983	Sammy Davis Jr. (Inedible Casserole #4)
1983	It's Christmas Time (Inedible Casserole #5)
1984	The Casserole of Death (Inedible Casserole #6)
1984	*You've Got a Friend: The White Prince Story
1987	Live! At Da 'Coma!
1987	That's That
1990	Parsley, Sage, Suffer and Leroy (Inedible Casserole #7)
1991	Your Sounds
1992	Live, Loud, Drunk & Out of Tune
1995	College Girls/Go Bruins (single)
1995	It is Balloon
2000	The Future Will Be Better Tomorrow (Radio Ball #11)
2004	Yearbook '04: Live! At Da 'Coma! (Radio Ball #24)
2005	Nature Calls
2005	Doin' Time (single)
2007	World Championship Songs 1980-2007 (compilation)
2008	*Resurrection
2010	Rip Your Mother

*Recorded, with Chris Blood on vocals, under the name of The White Prince with the Bat Brains From Venus.

Year	Album (Compilation Features)	Tracks
1983	Sub Pop-9	"Picnic Ape"
1984	1983 Rock Hunt	"Somethings"
1988	The Rounder Sub-Compact Disc, Volume 2	"Don't Tell Me"
1989	Lyrics by Ernest Noyes Brooking	"Headphones"
1991	Place of General Happiness (Lyrics by Ernest Noyes Brooking, vol. 2)	"Toast"
1993	Mash It Up '93	"Let's Get Better", "Step it Up"
1994	39 Steps to Seattle: An Alternative American History	"Crazy Girl"
1995	Outstandingly Ignited (Lyrics by Ernest Noyes Brooking, Volume 4)	"Spiders"
1997	The Tarquin Records All-Star Holiday Extravaganza	"Thanksgiving in Stoughton:
1997	Fireworks (24 Explosive Tracks)	"Be Here Now", "College Girls"
1999	Hit the Hay vol. 3	"I Still Believe in Summer"
1999	It's Heartbreak That Sells: A Tribute to Ray Mason	"Between Blue and Okay"
2000	Home Runs: Songs That'll Take You All the Way	"Money Won't Buy Happiness"
2001	What's Up Buttercup	"Everyone Plays Guitar (in the United States)"
2001	Ernie - Songs of Ernest Noyes Bookings	"Ape"
2009	Micke Finell and Friends: Walking With Me and Mr. Lee	"Yackety Yak"
2011	The Figgs/The Incredible Casuals: Citizen Band/Ape	"Ape"

=== Chandler Travis Philharmonic ===
Year	Album
1997	The Dreadful Hummings of Chandler Travis Philharmonic
1999	Raw Blarney
1999	Holiday Time (Radio Ball #1)
1999	Y' Gotta Have The Mental (Radio Ball #2)
2000	Rocket Travis Infinity Caravan 2000 (Radio Ball #3)
2000	Miss America Presents (Radio Ball #4)
2000	Let's Music, Volume 1 (Radio Ball #5)
2000	Taffy Shoot (Radio Ball #6)
2000	The Dog Ate My Album (Radio Ball #8)
2000	Bosoms (Radio Ball #9)
2000	The Sound of Food (Radio Ball #10)
2000	Live at Bickford's (Radio Ball #12)
2000	Monkeys of Nothing (Radio Ball #13)
2000	Let's Music, Volume 2 (Radio Ball #15)
2000	Introducing Chandler Travis Philharmonic (Radio Ball #18)
2000	Le Spectacle dans le Lizarde (Radio Ball #21)
2000	Let's Have a Pancake!
2002	Llama Rhymes
2003	Live at Babala's (Radio Ball #23)
2005	I'm a Fool for Christmas (Radio Ball #25)
2006	In Our Room (Radio Ball #26)
2007	Tarnation and Alastair slim aka Kitty
2010	The Chandler Travis Philharmonic Blows
2016	Waving Kissyhead vol. 1 (EP)
2017	Waving Kissyhead vol. 1 & 2
2017	Tribute to the Midway: Blurry Then, Blurry Now....
2017	Live at the Cutting Room
2018	Advice to the President (single)

Year	Album (Compilation Features)	Tracks
2005	Holiday Heart, A Hospice Awareness & Benefit Project	"If We Can Just Make it Through Christmas"
2012	Superhits of the Seventies	"Right Back Where We Started From"
2012	The Petite 7-inch Record	"Still Wanna Make a Record"
2014	The Date Fork Seeps the River Volume 3	"Italian Ape"

=== Chandler Travis Three-O ===
Year	Album
2012	This is What Bears Look Like Underwater
2012	January/Drunk, Angry People, Shut Up (single)
2018	Backwards Crooked From the Sunset

=== The Catbirds ===
Year	Album
2011	Viborate (EP)
2011	Gonna Keep Driving (single)
2012	Catbirds Say Yeah
2018	What Th? (EP)

Year	Album (Compilation Features)	Tracks
2013	Eponymously Titled	"Playin' Records"

=== Independent ===
Year	Album
1992	Writer-Songsinger
1996	His Lavender Silhouette
1996	Hi! I'm Lippy Blappinklappy!
1998	Ivan in Paris
2000	Dogsuit, Volume One (Radio Ball #7)
2000	Burned (Radio Ball #15)
2000	Dogsuit, Volume Two (Radio Ball #19)
2000	*Lester (Radio Ball #22)
2000	You Must Come Over Tonight (Radio Ball #20)
2004	Another Christmas Gift for You (compilation)
2009	After She Left
2012	First Warm Day by The Incredible Chandler Travis Catual Birdomonics (single)
2015	**Bocce and Bourbon: The Comforting Songs of Chandler Travis and David Greenberger

*Lester was recorded by Lester, a group led by Steve Wood from 1992-1993 with members: Travis, Jay Cournoyer and Cliff Letsche.

**Bocce and Bourbon: The Comforting Songs of ChandlerTravis and David Greenberger was co-written with David Greenberger.

Year	Album (Compilation Features)	Tracks
2004	Eddie-G's Screamin' Xmas!!	"Xmas Time"
2010	New Orleans Musicians Clinic	"I Want My Heart Back"
2014	7-inches and Other Delights	"Records 'n' Bubble"
2015	7-inches in Heaven	"Victrola", "Blamey Bubbles", "Blamey Bubble (outro)", "Side 2!"
2015	Rabbit Rabbit Radio vol. 3, Year of the Wooden Horse	"Nokomis"

== Other works ==
- Travis played on Jonathan Edwards albums; maraca on Honky-Tonk Stardust Cowboy (1972), and marimba on Rhino Hi-five (2006).
- Travis is credited on Martin Mull's albums; with backing vocals, harmonica, percussion and auxiliary in Martin Mull (1972), and with vocals on Mulling it Over: A Musical Oeuvre View (1998).
- Travis wrote and recorded the theme song for The George Carlin Show, and Carlin's TV pilot, Apt. 2c.
- Travis played bass guitar for the track "Antidisestablishmentarianism" from Go, Go, Gorilla's 1993 album It Was a Nightmare.
- The Incredible Casuals song "Summertime" was used in the film Touching the Game: The Story of the Cape Cod Baseball League (2004).
- Travis, Tom Ardolino, Johnny Spampinato, Aaron Spade & Rikki Bates are credited on P.J. O'Connell's album Careful (2007).
- Five songs by The Incredible Casuals were used in the film Paper Man (2009): "This World", "Summer Nights" and "No Fun at Parties", "I Wanna Play Loud" and "Gotta Have You."
- Travis wrote the score for the musical Boyce & Melinda Peterson’s Investment Strategies for the Post-Money World! (premiered 2009)
- Travis is credited on P.J. O'Connell's albums Join the Crowd (2011), and Happy Go Lucky (.
- Travis and Johnny Spampinato wrote original songs included on a soundtrack for The Simpsons.
- Travis played bass in Zoë Lewis & the Souvenirs.
- Travis is featured in the Mewgenics soundtrack song "Chumbucket Kitty", as well as the game's main theme song.
