= Shaggs' Own Thing =

Compilation album by the Shaggs
- Released: 1982
- Recorded: 1969–1975
- Genres: Pop, rock
- Length: 30:34
- Labels: Rounder; Red Rooster
- Producer: Austin Wiggin Jr. (original sessions)
- Compiler: Terry Adams

The Shaggs chronology
Philosophy of the World (1969)	Shaggs' Own Thing (1982)	The Shaggs (1988)

Shaggs' Own Thing is a 1982 compilation album by the American band the Shaggs, containing unreleased recordings made between 1969 and 1975. In 1988, Shaggs' Own Thing and the Shaggs' first album, Philosophy of the World, were remastered and rereleased by Rounder Records as the compilation The Shaggs.

== History ==
The Shaggs were an American rock band formed in Fremont, New Hampshire, in 1965, at the insistence of their father, Austin Wiggin, who believed that his mother had predicted their rise to fame. In 1969, Austin paid for the Shaggs to record an album, Philosophy of the World, at Fleetwood Studios in Revere, Massachusetts. It received no attention on release, but later developed a cult following, notable for its lack of technical proficiency, with bizarre melodies and rhythms.

In 1975, Austin took the Shaggs to Fleetwood Studios for another recording session. Though they had become more proficient through hundreds of hours of practice, the engineer wrote: "As the day progressed, I overcame my disappointment and started feeling sorry for this family paying $60 an hour for studio time to record — this?" The recordings went unreleased. Shortly after, Austin died of a heart attack and the Shaggs disbanded.

In 1980, Terry Adams and Tom Ardolino of the band NRBQ convinced the Shaggs sisters to reissue Philosophy of the World under their record label, Rounder Records. Shaggs' Own Thing, featuring material recorded in the 1975 session, was curated by Adams and Ardolino and released in 1982. In 1988, Philosophy of the World and Shaggs' Own Thing were remastered and rereleased by Rounder Records as the compilation The Shaggs.

== Content ==
Shaggs' Own Thing contains previously unreleased recordings made between 1969 and 1975. It includes contributions from the Shaggs' father, Austin Jr., their younger sister Rachel, and their brother Robert. It also includes several covers of popular songs of the early 1970s, in addition to new original songs and a re-recording of "My Pal Foot Foot" from Philosophy of the World.

== Reception ==
Professional ratings
Review scores
Source	Rating
AllMusic	4/5 stars

Shaggs' Own Thing was noted for greater stylistic variety and a higher level of musicianship compared to Philosophy of the World. The title track is a duet between Austin and his eldest son, Robert. Pitchfork described it as "particularly disturbing" and unintentionally Oedipal, noting that Austin sings of catching another man, his son, "doin' it" with "his girl".

== Track listing ==
Side One
No.	Title	Writer(s)	Length
1.	"You're Somethin' Special to Me"	Dorothy Wiggin	2:03
2.	"Wheels" (String-A-Longs cover)	Jimmy Torres; Richard Stephens	1:18
3.	"Paper Roses" (Anita Bryant/Marie Osmond cover)	Fred Spielman; Janice Torre	3:48
4.	"Shaggs' Own Thing (Musical Version)"	Dorothy Wiggin	2:05
5.	"Painful Memories"	Betty Wiggin	3:54
6.	"Gimme Dat Ding" (Pipkins cover; recorded live at Fremont Town Hall, Fremont, N.H.)	Albert Hammond; Mike Hazlewood	1:18

Side Two
No.	Title	Writer(s)	Length
7.	"My Cutie"	Dorothy Wiggin	2:14
8.	"Yesterday Once More" (Carpenters cover)	Richard Carpenter; John Bettis	3:23
9.	"My Pal Foot Foot"	Dorothy Wiggin	3:04
10.	"I Love" (Tom T. Hall cover)	Tom T. Hall	2:18
11.	"Shaggs' Own Thing (Vocal Version)"	Dorothy Wiggin; Austin Wiggin Jr.	3:54

== Personnel ==
- Dot Wiggin – lead guitar, vocals, arrangements
- Betty Wiggin – rhythm guitar, vocals
- Helen Wiggin – drums
- Rachel Wiggin – bass
- Austin Wiggin Jr. – vocal on "Shaggs' Own Thing"
- Robert Wiggin – vocal on "Shaggs' Own Thing"
- Original sessions produced by Austin Wiggin Jr.
- Sessions compiled and prepared for release by Terry Adams
- Snapshots of the Shaggs by Austin Wiggin Jr.
- Back photo by Ben Swiezyzski
- Design by Susan Marsh

2020 reissue

- Recorded January 20, 1975 at Fleetwood (tracks 1, 3–5, 8–11, 12), home rehearsal tapes (tracks 2 and 7), recorded live April 1, 1972 at Fremont Town Hall, Fremont, NH (track 6)
- Produced for rerelease by Pat Thomas
- Matt Sullivan and Josh Wright – rerelease executive producers
- Patrick McCarthy – project manager
- Yosuke Kitazawa – project assistance
- John DeAngelis – liner notes
- Henry H. Owings, Chunklet Graphic Control – rerelease design
- Paul Gold, Salt Mashering – remastering
