= NRBQ (album) =

Studio album by NRBQ
- Released: 1999
- Genre: Rock
- Label: Rounder
- Producer: Terry Adams, Joey Spampinato

NRBQ chronology
You Gotta Be Loose (1998)	NRBQ (1999)	Atsa My Band (2002)

NRBQ is an album by the American band NRBQ, released in 1999. According to NRBQ, the album is untitled, with just the band's name on the cover. It was NRBQ's final studio album for Rounder Records.

The album coincided with NRBQ's 30th anniversary and a period of renewed interest in the band, during which they appeared in The Simpsons and the film 28 Days. The band supported the album with a North American tour that included a 30th anniversary celebration with the Shaggs.

== Production ==
The album was recorded between January and May 1999. It was the first regular studio album with Johnny Spampinato on lead guitar; he wrote some of the album's songs with his brother. "Housekeeping" was inspired by decades of being awakened by hotel maids while on tour. "Tired of Your Permanent" was influenced by rockabilly music. "Birdman" was originally intended for Space Ghost Coast to Coast.

== Critical reception ==
Professional ratings
Review scores
Source	Rating
AllMusic	3/5 stars
Orlando Sentinel	4/5 stars
(The New) Rolling Stone Album Guide	3.5/5 stars
Winston-Salem Journal	1.5/4 stars

The Hartford Courant noted that "I Want My Mommy" "may well be the most annoying NRBQ song of all time." The Orlando Sentinel determined that the "gorgeous 'Blame It on the World' ... sounds like a long-lost McCartney-Gilberto Gil collaboration." The Courier News concluded that, "for the first time in many years, an NRBQ studio album fails to contain at least one truly memorable song."

The Telegram & Gazette stated that the album is "rocking, jazzy, bluesy, ballady, cartoony stuff pulled together with a patented NRBQ sense of logic." The New York Times wrote that NRBQ "still loves the same basic rock ingredients: the ingratiating melodies of 1960's pop, the twang and two-beat of rockabilly and the splashy, rowdy piano playing that links Jerry Lee Lewis to Sun Ra." The Morning Call listed NRBQ among the worst albums of 1999. The Winston-Salem Journal opined that "the aging band's air of childlike innocence, once charming, now seems creepy."

== Track listing ==
No.	Title	Writer(s)	Length
1.	"Ain't No Horse"	Donn Adams, Terry Adams	3:46
2.	"Sail On Sail On"	Joey Spampinato	3:10
3.	"Pain"	T. Adams	2:33
4.	"Housekeeping"	Joey Spampinato, Johnny Spampinato, T. Adams	3:26
5.	"Breakaway to My Dreams"	Joey Spampinato, Johnny Spampinato	2:52
6.	"Puddin' Truck"	T. Adams	3:14
7.	"CM Pups"	T. Adams	3:09
8.	"Take Me to Your Secret"	Joey Spampinato, Johnny Spampinato, T. Adams	2:47
9.	"Blame It on the World"	Joey Spampinato, Johnny Spampinato	3:02
10.	"Birdman"	David Greenberger, T. Adams	1:03
11.	"I Want My Mommy"	T. Adams	2:01
12.	"Careful What You Ask For"	Joey Spampinato	3:23
13.	"Tired of Your Permanent"	T. Adams	2:05
14.	"Love Came to Me"	Joey Spampinato	3:05
15.	"Termites"	T. Adams	3:22
