= Philosophy of the World =

1969 studio album by the Shaggs

Studio album by the Shaggs
- Released: June 15, 1969
- Recorded: March 9, 1969
- Studios: Fleetwood Studios (Revere, Massachusetts); Fremont Town Hall (Fremont, New Hampshire)
- Genres: Avant-garde; outsider music; experimental rock
- Length: 31:39
- Label: Third World
- Producer: Austin Wiggin Jr.

The Shaggs chronology
| Philosophy of the World (1969) | Shaggs' Own Thing (1982) |

Singles from Philosophy of the World
- 1. "My Pal Foot Foot" / "Things I Wonder" Released: 1969

Philosophy of the World is the only studio album by the American band the Shaggs, released in 1969. It has been described as both among the worst records of all time and a work of "accidental genius".

The Shaggs formed at the insistence of their father, Austin Wiggin, who believed that his mother had predicted their rise to fame. Philosophy of the World was recorded in 1969 in Revere, Massachusetts, and released in limited quantities by a local record label. It received no attention and the Shaggs disbanded in 1975 after Austin's death.

The Shaggs had no interest in becoming musicians and never became proficient in songwriting or performing. Philosophy of the World features bizarre songs with badly tuned guitars, erratically shifting time signatures, disconnected drum parts, wandering melodies and rudimentary lyrics about pets and families. Over the decades, Philosophy of the World developed a cult following, circulating among musicians and attracting fans including NRBQ, Frank Zappa and Kurt Cobain. After it was reissued on Rounder Records in 1980, it received enthusiastic reviews for its uniqueness in Rolling Stone and The Village Voice.

== Background ==
The Shaggs were formed in 1965 by the teenage sisters Dorothy ("Dot"), Betty, and Helen Wiggin in the small town of Fremont, New Hampshire. They formed at the behest of their father and manager, Austin Wiggin Jr. When Austin was young, his mother had read his palm and made three predictions: he would marry a strawberry-blonde woman, he would have two sons after she had died, and his daughters would form a popular band. When the first two predictions proved accurate, Austin set about fulfilling the third. Dot later said the sisters thought their father was "nuts", but they did not want to do anything to insult their grandmother in his eyes.

Austin withdrew his daughters from school, bought them instruments and arranged for them to receive music and vocal lessons. He designed their schedule and had them practice as a band for hours every day. The sisters had no interest in becoming musicians and did not enjoy the rehearsals. Dot later said: "[Our father] was stubborn and he could be temperamental. He directed. We obeyed. Or did our best." Austin arranged for the band to perform at the Fremont town hall every weekend for several years.

== Recording ==
In March 1969, Austin took the Shaggs to record at Fleetwood Studios in Revere, Massachusetts. The studio was mainly used to record local rock groups and school marching bands. Austin dismissed the engineer's opinion that the Shaggs were not ready to record, saying: "I want to get them while they're hot."

One producer, Bobby Herne, recalled: "We shut the control room doors and rolled on the floor laughing. Just rolled! It was horrible. They did not know what they were doing, but they thought it was okay. They were just in another world." He said the girls "smelled like cows. Right off the farm. Not a dirty smell — just smelled like cows."

Shortly afterwards, Herne and another Fleetwood employee, Charlie Dreyer, bought the Third World recording studio in Jamaica Plain, Massachusetts. They were enlisted to remix the Shaggs' recordings, and hired session musicians to rerecord parts. The attempt was abandoned when the musicians were unable to follow the Shaggs' erratic timing.

== Release ==
Austin paid to have Third World press 1000 copies of Philosophy of the World. He wrote the album's liner notes, which said the Shaggs "loved" making music and described them as "real, pure, unaffected by outside influences".

According to many accounts, Dreyer delivered only 100 copies of the album and disappeared with the remaining 900. Dot recalled: "He took my father's money, gave us one box of albums, and ran. My father couldn't get in touch with him. He tried telephone calls, but no one knew where he was." However, according to the music executive Harry Palmer, Dreyer said Austin had refused to distribute the extra copies because he feared someone would copy the Shaggs' music. Dreyer kept boxes of the records in the studio and would give them to anyone who asked. The journalist Irwin Chusid argued that it was unlikely Dreyer had stolen the records, as they were valueless at the time; many copies may have simply been disposed of. Philosophy of the World received no media coverage.

The songs "My Pal Foot Foot" and "Things I Wonder" were released as a 45 rpm single on Fleetwood Records. In 1975, Austin died of a heart attack at the age of 47. The Shaggs disbanded and sold most of their equipment. They had never profited from their music and took blue-collar jobs to support their families.

=== Reissues ===
In the 1970s, copies of Philosophy of the World circulated among musicians and it developed a cult following. In 1980, Terry Adams and Tom Ardolino of the American band NRBQ convinced the Wiggin sisters to reissue Philosophy of the World under their record label, Rounder Records. The sisters were cautious, and asked how much it would cost. Adams told them: "No, we'll be paying you." Adams and Ardolino curated a new release, the 1982 compilation Shaggs' Own Thing, comprising unreleased recordings made between 1969 and 1975. In 1988, Philosophy of the World and Shaggs' Own Thing were remastered and rereleased by Rounder Records as the compilation The Shaggs. In 1999, RCA Victor reissued Philosophy of the World with the original cover and track listing. Despite the increasing interest in outsider music and airplay on college radio stations, the reissue sold poorly.

== Reception ==
Professional ratings
Aggregate scores
| Source | Rating |
|---|---|
| Metacritic | 86/100 |
Review scores
| Source | Rating |
| AllMusic | 4.5/5 stars |
| Lester Bangs | (favorable) |
| Mojo | (favorable) (2008) (2016) |
| Pitchfork | 8.6/10 |
| PopMatters | 8/10 |
| Record Collector | 4/5 stars |
| Spin Alternative Record Guide | 9/10 |
| Uncut | 4.5/5 stars |

When it was released, Philosophy of the World received no media coverage. When it was reissued in 1980, Debra Rae Cohen wrote for Rolling Stone: "Philosophy of the World is the sickest, most stunningly awful wonderful record I've heard in ages: the perfect mental purgative for doldrums of any kind. Like a lobotomized Trapp Family Singers, the Shaggs warble earnest greeting-card lyrics (...) in happy, hapless quasi-unison along ostensible lines of melody while strumming their tinny guitars like someone worrying a zipper. The drummer pounds gamely to the call of a different muse, as if she had to guess which song they were playing — and missed every time." In a later Rolling Stone article, Chris Connelly wrote: "Without exaggeration, it may stand as the worst album ever recorded." Rolling Stone awarded it their "Comeback of the Year" honor.

In The Village Voice, Lester Bangs wrote: "How do they sound? Perfect! They can't play a lick! But mainly they got the right attitude, which is all rock 'n' roll's ever been about from day one." He wrote that Philosophy of the World could stand with albums by the Beatles, Bob Dylan and Teenage Jesus and the Jerks as "one of the landmarks of rock 'n' roll history".

Many listeners wondered if Philosophy of the World was the worst album ever recorded. In a 1999 profile for The New Yorker, Susan Orlean wrote that "depending on whom you ask, the Shaggs were either the best band of all time or the worst". In 2026, The Times called Philosophy of the World the worst album of all time.

Due to its sloppy playing and mostly nonsensical lyrics, the album became a favorite among collectors and has been called "proto-punk" by some critics. Nirvana frontman Kurt Cobain listed Philosophy of the World as his fifth favorite album of all time. The album also came to the attention of Frank Zappa, who described the band as "The missing link between Fanny and Captain Beefheart" when he appeared on the Dr. Demento radio show in late 1973.

In 2007, Blender named Philosophy of the World the 100th-greatest indie rock album. NME included it in its list of the "100 greatest albums you've never heard". In 2016, Rolling Stone ranked it the 17th-greatest "one-album wonder", and in 2018 Paste listed named it the 30th-best garage rock album.

== Track listing ==
All songs written and arranged by Dorothy Wiggin.

Side one
| No. | Title | Length |
|---|---|---|
| 1. | "Philosophy of the World" | 2:56 |
| 2. | "That Little Sports Car" | 2:06 |
| 3. | "Who Are Parents?" | 2:58 |
| 4. | "My Pal Foot Foot" | 2:31 |
| 5. | "My Companion" | 2:04 |
| 6. | "I'm So Happy When You're Near" | 2:12 |
| Total length: | | 14:47 |

Side two
| No. | Title | Length |
|---|---|---|
| 1. | "Things I Wonder" | 2:12 |
| 2. | "Sweet Thing" | 2:57 |
| 3. | "It's Halloween" | 2:22 |
| 4. | "Why Do I Feel?" | 3:57 |
| 5. | "What Should I Do?" | 2:18 |
| 6. | "We Have a Savior" | 3:06 |
| Total length: | | 16:52 |

== Personnel ==
- Dorothy (aka Dot) Wiggin – lead guitar, vocals
- Betty Wiggin Porter – rhythm guitar, backing vocals
- Helen Wiggin – drums
- Rachel Wiggin – bass guitar on "That Little Sports Car"

Production

- Original recordings produced by Austin Wiggin Jr. (and Charlie Dreyer, uncredited)
- Recorded and engineered by Bob Olive and Austin Wiggin Jr.
