= Message for the Mess Age =

Studio album by NRBQ
- Released: 1994
- Genre: Pop, pop rock
- Label: Forward
- Producer: Terry Adams, Joey Spampinato

NRBQ chronology
Stay with We (1993)	Message for the Mess Age (1994)	Tokyo (1996)

Message for the Mess Age is an album by the American band NRBQ, released in 1994. It marked the band's 25th anniversary as a recording act. The album became the band's biggest seller less than six months after it was released. The first single was "A Little Bit of Bad". The band supported the album with a North American tour.

== Production ==
The album was produced by Terry Adams and Joey Spampinato. It was the last album to which guitar player Al Anderson contributed; he used a Fender Squier guitar and amp. Johnny Spampinato took Anderson's position. Gary Windo played saxophone on "Spampinato", a song about the correct way to spell the bass player's name.

The band wrote six new songs for Message for the Mess Age. "Don't Bite the Head" is about the banality of mainstream music. "Ramona" and "A Better Word for Love" are performed as ballads. The lyrics to "Over Your Head" were inspired by journalistic reporting of the Gulf War.

== Critical reception ==
Professional ratings
Review scores
Source	Rating
Calgary Herald	B+
Chicago Tribune	3.5/4 stars
The Encyclopedia of Popular Music	3/5 stars
MusicHound Rock: The Essential Album Guide	3.5/5 stars
Orlando Sentinel	5/5 stars
Pittsburgh Post-Gazette	3/4 stars
(The New) Rolling Stone Album Guide	3.5/5 stars
Spin Alternative Record Guide	7/10
The Tampa Tribune	3.5/4 stars
USA Today	3/4 stars

The Austin American-Statesman wrote that Anderson's songs "are the album's strongest, and they provide a necessary balance for Adams' incorrigible whimsy, which occasionally infects the material with an incurable case of the cutes." The Los Angeles Times noted that, "if overall the album lacks the seamless wonder of its predecessor, Wild Weekend, it's only because the band's laudable willingness to experiment inevitably produces some failures." The Vancouver Sun deemed NRBQ "the world's premier pop-rock-jazz-country quartet."

The Orlando Sentinel determined that "the production has a lustrous sheen, but the arrangements are full of striking and unusual details." The Pittsburgh Post-Gazette called the album "infectious, foot-stomping music... And the quirkiness reflected in the disc's title is found throughout." The Gazette stated that "NRBQ is virtually alone in expressing the sense of wonder at the heart of great pop, a band putting effortless complexity and more chops than the lumberjack union at the service of throwaway, top-down summer-breeze toons."

== Track listing ==
No.	Title	Length
1.	"Over Your Head"
2.	"A Little Bit of Bad"
3.	"Don't Bite the Head"
4.	"Big Dumb Jukebox"
5.	"Designated Driver"
6.	"Ramona"
7.	"Everybody Thinks I'm Crazy"
8.	"Nothin' Wrong with Me"
9.	"Spampinato"
10.	"A Better Word for Love"
11.	"Advice for Teenagers"
12.	"Girl Scout Cookies"
13.	"Everybody's Smokin'"
