= Scraps (album) =

Studio album by NRBQ
- Released: 1972
- Recorded: July 1970 – December 1971
- Genre: Power pop, folk, country rock, rock and roll
- Length: 48:11
- Label: Kama Sutra (original); Rounder (reissue)
- Producer: Eddie Kramer

NRBQ chronology
Boppin' the Blues (with Carl Perkins) (1970)	Scraps (1972)	Workshop (1973)

Professional ratings
Review scores
Source	Rating
AllMusic	4/5 stars
Christgau's Record Guide	B
PopMatters	(favorable)
Rolling Stone	(not rated)

Scraps is an album by the rock band NRBQ (New Rhythm and Blues Quartet), released in 1972 on Kama Sutra Records, which also released their next album, Workshop. It is the group's first album with guitarist/vocalist Al Anderson, who would remain with the band for over twenty years. Anderson replaced previous guitarist Ken Sheehan. Anderson was prohibited from singing lead vocals on the album due to an existing contract as a solo artist with Vanguard Records. Frank Gadler, the group's original vocalist, sings lead on most of the songs, although Joey Spampinato, (credited under both his real name and the pseudonym Jody St. Nicholas), sings lead on all the songs he had a hand in writing except "Don't Knock At My Door," on which Gadler takes the lead. A promotional version of the album was released with a different cover, entitled "Changes."

== Track listing ==
1. "Howard Johnson's Got His Ho-Jo Working" (Terry Adams) – 3:20
2. "Magnet" (Adams, Joey Spampinato) – 3:30
3. "Don't Knock at My Door" (Spampinato) – 2:59
4. "Tragic Magic" (Adams) – 1:52
5. "Only You" (Spampinato) – 2:46
6. "Who Put the Garlic in the Glue?" (Adams) – 2:01
7. "Get a Grip" (Adams, Steve Ferguson) – 4:29
8. "Boys in the City" (Spampinato) – 2:29
9. "New Tune" (Adams) – 2:35
10. "Scraps" (Adams) – 4:06
11. "It's Not So Hard" (Spampinato) – 2:44
12. "Ac-Cent-Tchu-Ate the Positive / Things Are Getting Better" (Johnny Mercer, Harold Arlen / Cannonball Adderley) – 3:15
13. "Do You Feel It?" (Adams) – 2:51
14. "Ain't It All Right" (Ferguson, Adams) – 2:23
15. "Just Close Your Eyes and Be Mine Ruby" (Adams) – 3:18
16. "Hymn #9" (Adams) – 1:14
17. "Trouble at the Henhouse" (Spampinato) – 2:13

Note: Tracks 15–17 were not on the original LP; they were first issued on the 2000 CD reissue.

== Personnel ==
- Terry Adams - clavinet, piano, harmonica, vocals
- Joey Spampinato - bass, vocals, acoustic guitar
- Al Anderson - electric and acoustic guitars
- Tom Staley - drums
- Frank Gadler - vocals
- Kenny Sheehan - guitar on 1, 9, 10
- Steve Ferguson - guitar on 14
- Donn Adams - trombone on 4, 12
- Doug Wray and Link Wray - backing vocals on 7
