= Tapdancin' Bats =

Studio album by NRBQ
- Released: 1983
- Recorded: 1972–1981
- Genre: Pop; rock; avant-garde jazz; classical
- Label: Rounder
- Producer: Terry Adams; Joey Spampinato

NRBQ chronology
Grooves in Orbit (1983)	Tapdancin' Bats (1983)	She Sings, They Play (with Skeeter Davis (1985)

Professional ratings
Review scores
Source	Rating
AllMusic	4/5 stars
Robert Christgau	A−
The New Rolling Stone Album Guide	3/5 stars

Tapdancin' Bats is an album by the band NRBQ. It was released in 1983.

The album is composed entirely of archival material. At the time of production, NRBQ were signed to Bearsville Records and the label's owner, Albert Grossman, did not want NRBQ to record more albums for the label, but also would not let them out of their contract. NRBQ had amassed enough archival material to compile several future albums and used some of this material for Tapdancin' Bats.

== Track listing ==
1. "Captain Lou" (Al Anderson, Terry Adams) - 2:32
2. "I Don't Think Of..." (Joey Spampinato) - 2:45
3. "Proctor's Gamble" - 1:56
4. "You Got It" (Terry Adams) - 2:54
5. "Rats in My Room" (Danny Neaverth, James Cupola, Joey Reynolds) - 2:30
6. "Big Goodbyes" (Terry Adams) - 3:52
7. "Tex" (Al Anderson, Joey Spampinato) - 1:29
8. "Boardin' House Pie" - 2:57
9. "Trouble at the Henhouse" (Joey Spampinato) - 2:18
10. "Ain't It All Right" (Steve Ferguson, Terry Adams) - 3:01
11. "Pretty Thing" (Terry Adams) - 2:40
12. "Dry Up and Blow Away" (Donn Adams) - 3:06
13. "Come On and Ride" - 4:44
14. "Capriccio" - 1:56
15. "The Dough Got Low" (Terry Adams) - 2:12
16. "Tapdancin' Bats" (Donn Adams, Joey Spampinato, Keith Spring, Terry Adams, Tom Ardolino) - 2:52
