= Brass Tacks (album) =

Studio album by NRBQ
- Released: June 17, 2014
- Genre: Rock and roll; jazz; R&B; rockabilly
- Length: 37:07
- Label: Clang!
- Producer: Big Notes

NRBQ chronology
We Travel the Spaceways (2012)	Brass Tacks (2014)	Turn On, Tune In (2019)

Brass Tacks is an album by the rock band NRBQ. It was released by Clang! Records on June 17, 2014. It was NRBQ's third album since the band was re-formed by founding member Terry Adams in 2011. Besides Adams on keyboards and vocals, Brass Tacks features Scott Ligon on guitar and vocals, Casey McDonough on bass and vocals, and Conrad Choucroun on drums.

== Critical reception ==
Professional ratings
Review scores
Source	Rating
Allmusic	3.5/5 stars
PopMatters	7/10 stars

In Rolling Stone, Dave DiMartino wrote, "If you were to take every NRBQ album ever released and grade it for sheer joy and listenability, well, you probably should spend less time grading and more time listening.... Brass Tacks... contains the fun, zest, humor and flat-out rock that has defined the band since their birth decades ago. When this band covers "Getting To Know You", it is a sign that all is right with the world, there is yet another NRBQ album to enjoy, and that some folks, thankfully, never know when to quit. Please do keep it up."

On AllMusic, Mark Deming said, "... the group sounds more like the old NRBQ than ever, and given how great that band was, that's a fine thing. Now as always, Adams is a tremendously gifted keyboard man, songwriter, and vocalist, and he's fired up his bandmates with the sound and feel that was the band's trademark... NRBQ's mix of rock & roll, jazz, and R&B is as singular and as satisfying as ever, and this wouldn't sound out of place next to much of the classic lineup's recordings, no small accomplishment."

In PopMatters, Will Layman wrote, "While Adams is clearly the leader of the band when you see them in a small club these days – he's the circus master and the mad old man, the magician and the trickster – the music on all these records is decidedly cooperative, which was always the 'Q way.... All of the music might have appeared on an old NRBQ collection: it is tuneful, rootsy, rockabilly, sentimental, about cars or love or both, weird, interesting. There’s hardly a tune here that isn't built with a sturdy set of chords or a fun metaphor at the center — but it's equally true that the recordings themselves are almost willfully casual."

On Making a Scene, Robert Putignano said, "I've always thought highly of Terry Adams piano playing and felt he never received the appropriate kudos for his creativity and superb chops. He's so unique (at times) blending and bending the likes of Jerry Lee Lewis and Sun Ra, how's that for a pairing?... But there’s no doubt that under Adams' tutelage this edition of NRBQ captures and maintains the core nuances and quirkiness of any and all previous versions of NRBQ. So I am very impressed to hear their old-school familiar antics, along with a new flare for staying fully committed to carrying their unique banner into 2014 and (hopefully) onward."

== Track listing ==
1. "Waitin' on My Sweetie Pie" (Scott Ligon) – 2:52
2. "Greetings from Delaware" (Terry Adams) – 3:29
3. "Sit in My Lap" (Adams) – 2:38
4. "Fightin' Back" (Casey McDonough) – 3:30
5. "It'll Be Alright" (Ligon) – 2:33
6. "This Flat Tire" (Adams) – 4:39
7. "I'd Like to Know" (Jim Hoke) – 2:03
8. "Places Far Away" (Adams) – 4:36
9. "Can't Wait to Kiss You" (McDonough) – 1:47
10. "I'm Not Here" (Adams, Ligon) – 3:34
11. "Getting to Know You" (Richard Rodgers, Oscar Hammerstein II) – 2:03
12. "Love This Love We Got" (Adams, Ligon, McDonough) – 2:49

== Personnel ==
NRBQ

- Terry Adams – piano, clavinet, harmonica, vocals
- Scott Ligon – guitar, banjo, piano, vocals
- Casey McDonough – bass, vocals
- Conrad Choucroun – drums

Additional musicians

- Joe Camarillo – drums on "Greetings from Delaware" and "I'm Not Here"
- Jimmy Gordon – harmonica on "This Flat Tire"

Production

- Produced by Big Notes
- Recording, mixing, photography: Norm DeMoura
- Mastering: Alan Stockwell
- Design: David Greenberger
