= Tom Ardolino =

American drummer (1955–2012)

- Born: Thomas Robert Ardolino; January 12, 1955; Springfield, Massachusetts
- Died: January 6, 2012 (aged 56) Springfield, Massachusetts
- Occupation: Musician
- Instrument: Drums
- Formerly of: NRBQ, The Minus 5
- Website: www.nrbq.com

Thomas Robert Ardolino (January 12, 1955 – January 6, 2012) was an American rock drummer best known as a member of NRBQ (New Rhythm and Blues Quartet).

== Biography ==
Tom Ardolino was born and raised in Springfield, Massachusetts. A fan of the band, he began corresponding and trading tapes with keyboardist and co-founder Terry Adams. This led to him meeting and befriending the band. At one live show at the Rusty Nail in Sunderland, Massachusetts, when original NRBQ drummer Tom Staley did not return for an encore, Adams invited Ardolino to fill in. He performed well enough that when Staley left the band in 1974, his bandmates agreed that Ardolino was the natural choice as successor.

Ardolino remained in the lineup until the band went on hiatus in 2004, returning for occasional performances with Adams, and contributing to solo recordings by Adams (Rhythm Spell and Holy Tweet), by NRBQ (Keep This Love Going and We Travel the Spaceways) and others (see Selected Discography).

While lead vocals were generally performed by other members of NRBQ, live shows often included a moment where Ardolino would take the spotlight and sing, either with a karaoke backing track or with one of the other band members drumming.

Ardolino's solo album Unknown Brain was released in 2004 on CD by Bumble Bee Records, Japan and on vinyl LP in the USA on Mystra Records. The album consists mostly of basement recordings made in 1971–72. The cover states "WARNING: If out-of-tuneness bothers you, do not listen."

He was also an avid collector of song poems, and initiated the "MSR Madness" series of compilations.

Ardolino appeared in a promotional video to campaign for the world premiere of The Simpsons Movie in his hometown of Springfield.

Tom Ardolino died on January 6, 2012, at a Springfield, Massachusetts, hospital; this was reported on the NRBQ Headquarters page on Facebook. A later article from the Washington Post specified the cause as diabetes.

== Selected discography ==
- All Hopped Up (Red Rooster Records) 1978
- At Yankee Stadium (Mercury Records) 1978
- Kick Me Hard (Red Rooster Records) 1979
- Tiddlywinks (Red Rooster Records) 1980
- NRBQ in Person! (Red Rooster Records) 1982
- Grooves in Orbit (Bearsville Records) 1983
- Tapdancin' Bats (Red Rooster Records) 1983
- She Sings, They Play (Red Rooster Records) 1985, with Skeeter Davis
- Christmas Wish (Rounder Records) 1985
- Lou & the Q (Red Rooster Records) 1986, with Lou Albano
- Uncommon Denominators (Rounder Records) 1986
- God Bless Us All (Rounder Records) 1987
- Through the Eyes of a Quartet (Demon Music Group) 1987
- Diggin' Uncle Q (Rounder Records) 1988
- Truth or Consequences (Amigo-Sweden) 1988
- Wild Weekend (Virgin Records) 1989
- Peek-A-Boo, The Best of NRBQ 1969-89 (Rhino Entertainment) 1990
- Honest Dollar (Rykodisc) 1992
- Stormalong (Rabbit Ears/BMG Kidz) 1992, with John Candy
- Message for the Mess Age (Rhino Entertainment) 1992
- Tokyo (Dreamsville – Japan) 1996
- Christmas Wish (Big Notes) 1996
- Tokyo (Rounder Records) 1997
- You're Nice People, You Are (Rounder Records) 1997
- You Gotta Be Loose (Rounder Records) 1997
- NRBQ (Rounder Records) 1999
- Ridin' in My Car (Rounder Records) 1999
- Christmas Wish – Extended Edition (Dreamsville – Japan) 2000
- Atsa My Band (Edisun) 2002
- Music's Been Good to You (Edisun) 2007
- Live from Mountain Stage (Blue Plate) 2002
- Live at the Wax Museum (Edisun) 2003, with John Sebastian
- Transmissions (Caraway-Japan) 2004
- Froggy's Favorites (Clang) 2006
- Christmas Wish – Deluxe Edition (Clang!) 2007
- Keep This Love Going (Clang!) 2011
- We Travel the Spaceways (Clang!) 2012

With Terry Adams

- Terrible (New World Records) 1995
- Rhythm Spell (Clang!) 2007
- Holy Tweet (Clang!) 2009

With Steve Ferguson

- Mama U-Seapa (Schoolkids Records) 1995

With Terry Adams and Steve Ferguson

- Louisville Sluggers (Clang!) 2006

With PJ O'Connell

- Happy Go Lucky (Edisun) 2002
- Careful (Clang!) 2006

With Johnny Johnson

- Johnnie B. Bad (Elektra Records) 1991

With Hot Shots

- Teen Street (Clang! – US and Vivid Sound Corporation - Japan) 2008

With Neanderthals

- The Modern Stone-Age Family (Sundazed Music) 1999

With Jim Stephanson

- Say Go (Clang!) 2010

With Instant Cytron

- Little Gang Of The Universe (Dreamsville Records) 2000

Solo:

- Unknown Brain (Bumblebee Records) 2004

As Producer/Presenter

- The Beat of the Traps: MSR Madness Vol 1 (Carnage Press) 1992
- The Makers of Smooth Music: MSR Madness Vol 2 (Carnage Press) 2007
- Off The Charts: The Song Poem Story Various artists (Red Rock Records - film soundtrack)

== Video/Film/TV ==
- Derbytown (Recorded Live in Louisville, 1982, MVD Visual)
- One in a Million (Recorded Live in Montreal, 1989, MVD Visual)
- Saturday Night with Connie Chung (band profile, CBS, 1989)
- Complex World, (director Jim Wolpaw, 1992)
- Take My Wife, Sleaze, episode 234 of The Simpsons, first broadcast November 28, 1999
- Off the Charts: The Song Poem Story (director Jamie Meltzer, 2003)
- NRBQ: Rock & Roll's Best-Kept Secret (produced by Mike Scully and Julie Thacker), first broadcast on A&E (TV channel)'s Breakfast with the Arts on January 26, 2003
- Live in Performance (SRO Entertainment, 2006)
