= Kami Lyle =

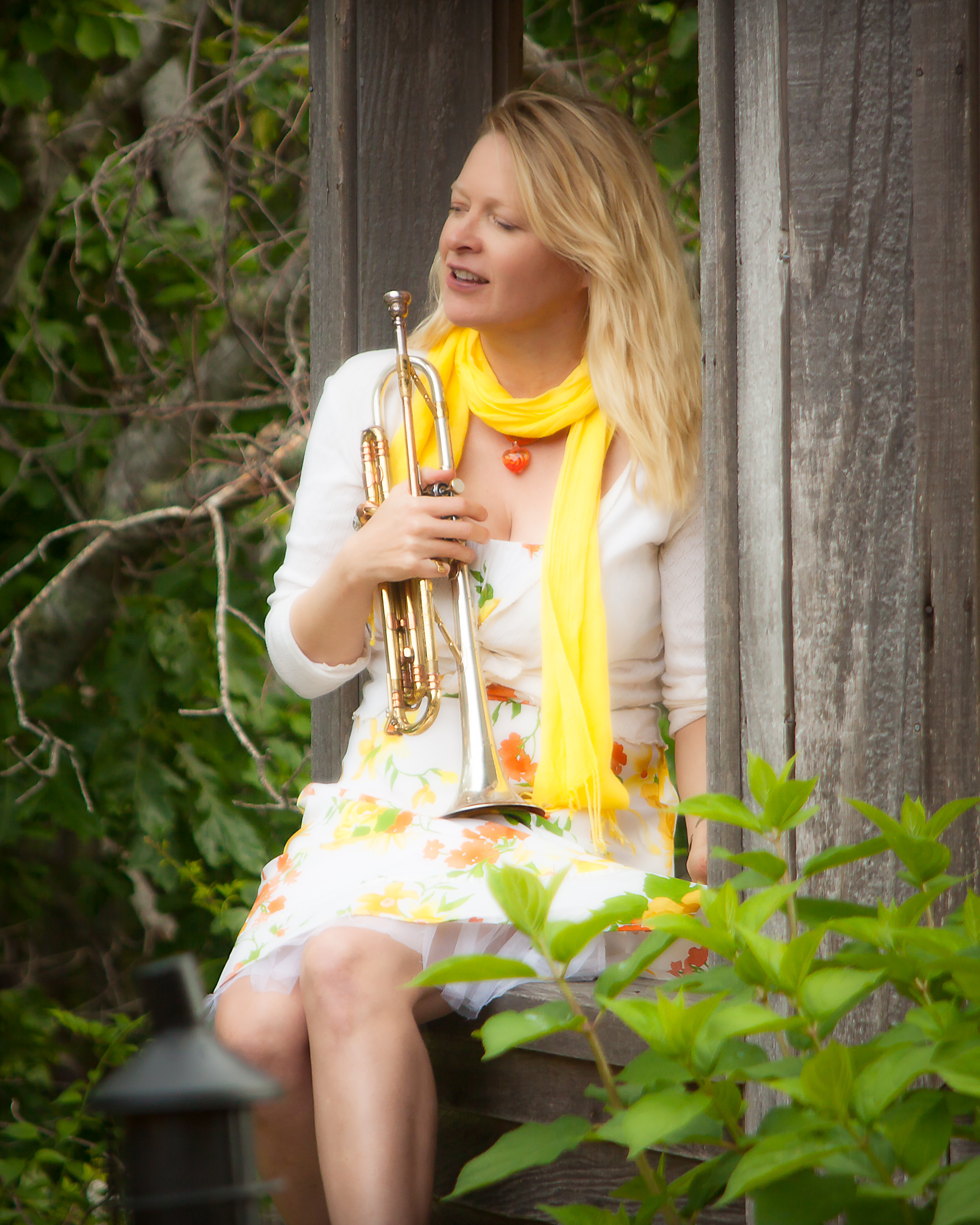

Background information
- Born: Kimberlee Howg; September 7, 1968 (age 58); Edina, Minnesota
- Genres: Jazz, Pop
- Occupations: Musician, Singer-songwriter
- Instruments: trumpet, piano
- Labels: MCA, Artists House, Criterion Music
- Website: https://www.kamilyle.net/

Kami Lyle is an American singer/songwriter from Minneapolis, now living on Cape Cod, Massachusetts with her husband and musician, Joey Spampinato.

== Early life and education ==
Born in the Minneapolis suburb of Edina, Minnesota, Lyle studied trumpet at the age of 9, having learned to appreciate music from her mother, a classically trained pianist and saxophonist. By the age of 19, she accompanied a salsa band for a gig at the University of Minnesota, and subsequently joined a local musical group, Mexcal, a Tex-Mex band. She gained her stage name while working at a local bookstore, when she lost her name-tag and replaced it with that of a prior employee named Kami. She combined this with her father's first name, Lyle. Her many experiences and travels throughout Minnesota would later serve as material for her intimate songwriting.

== Professional career ==
Lyle graduated from the Berklee College Of Music in 1992. After graduation, she moved to Nashville where she worked a variety of side jobs (many of which serve as a basis for her songwriting) while pursuing her musical career. While playing with an informal Sunday-Night combo called “Swill Cheese Pontiac”, she was signed by MCA and produced her debut album, Blue Cinderella, released in 1997, which consisted of a series of character-sketch narratives and semi-autobiographical passages. One such song, ‘Grocery Song’ was written about her experiences as a supermarket bagger. She won multiple accolades and reviews, including a review by Billboard who dubbed her “a young lady with a horn and a fresh take on pop”.

Lyle formed a band called the Kami Lyle Trio with her husband, Joey Spampinato, and guitarist Tad Price. In 2013, Lyle began hosting an interactive musical and storytelling forum, bring national artists to Cape Cod using a format of "playing in the round", called the "Kami Lyle Sit a While". In recent years, Kami formed Kami and Friends with Joey Spampinato, Jerome Deupree, Barbara Blaisdell and Tim Utt. They performed at The Continental Club for the South by Southwest Music Conference and Festival in March of 2023.

== Discography ==
- Blue Cinderella, 1997, MCA
- Ten Songs, 2005, Kami Lyle
