= Dot Wiggin Band =

American rock band

- The Dot Wiggin Band in 2013, from left to right: Brittany Anjou, Nick Oddy, Adam Minkoff, Dot Wiggin, Mike Fornatale, Jesse Krakow and Rich Bennett

Background information
- Origin: United States
- Years active: 2012–2015
- Label: Alternative Tentacles
- Members: Brittany Anjou; Rich Bennett; Laura Cromwell; Mike Fornatale; Jesse Krakow; Adam Minkoff; Nick Oddy; Dorothy "Dot" Wiggin
- Website: dotwigginband.com

The Dot Wiggin Band was an American band fronted by Dot Wiggin of the 1960s outsider music band the Shaggs. They released their debut album, Ready! Get! Go! in 2013 on Jello Biafra's label Alternative Tentacles.

== Formation ==
Dot Wiggin was the lead singer, guitarist and songwriter of the Shaggs, along with her sisters Helen (drums) and Betty Wiggin (guitar, vocals). In 2012, bassist Jesse Krakow organized a tribute to the Shaggs, in which he invited Dot, Betty and Rachel Wiggin of the Shaggs to be honored guests. At the Q&A portion of the evening, Dot was asked if she still wrote songs, to which she replied yes. Jesse raised his hand and asked if he could help her record them. The Dot Wiggin Band quickly formed, and recorded their first album in winter of 2012, and began performing live in 2013. Band members include Dot Wiggin (vocals, songwriting), Brittany Anjou (keys, co-vocals, toy piano), Laura Cromwell (drums, vocals), Adam Minkoff (guitar/bass), Nick Oddy (guitar), Rich Bennett (guitar), Mike Fornatale (guitar), and Jesse Krakow (bass, vocals, songwriting). The album includes recent songs written by Dot as well as songs she wrote for the Shaggs in the 1970s that had not been previously recorded. In 2026, Wiggin said the band had ended and that she would no longer be performing.

== Live ==
The Dot Wiggin Band opened for Neutral Milk Hotel on tour in April 2015. The band has many fans and support from Shaggs' audiences worldwide. In performance, Dot sings old Shaggs songs re-created live by members who have become familiar with the repertoire as recorded on the original Shaggs albums, which has created interest and confusion amongst audiences unfamiliar with the Shaggs. The live touring lineup features members of sister band, Bi TYRANT, a feminist hardcore punk band from Brooklyn led by co-vocalist Brittany Anjou.

== Discography ==
Albums

- Ready! Get! Go! (2013, Alternative Tentacles)

Singles

- "Banana Bike" (2013, Below The Radar 16, Wire Magazine)
- "A Christmas Song" (2014, SoundCloud, featuring the Shaggs)
- "My Favorite Record" (2015, 7 Inches In Heaven, Bubbles in the Think Tank Records)
