= Brittany Anjou =

American musician

- Born: Brittany Anjou
- Genre: Jazz
- Occupations: Musician, composer, producer, bandleader
- Instrument: Piano
- Years active: 2006- Present

Brittany Anjou is a New York City-based musician, composer, pianist, vibraphonist, and producer. Anjou leads music ensembles, works as a music director and side musician, and produces several projects as a composer, multi-instrumentalist, vocalist, and songwriter.

As a mixed-methods researcher, she has presented her music psychology research on NYC musicians' mental health and wellbeing at academic and global conferences.

== Biography ==
Anjou studied jazz while growing up in Seattle. She performed with Clark Terry and Wynton Marsalis before attending New York University, where she studied music with Stefon Harris, Don Friedman, Gil Goldstein, George Garzone, Sherrie Maricle, Jason Moran, Ralph Alessi, Vijay Iyer, and Rudresh Manhanthappa.

Anjou also studied music in Prague with Emil Viclicky and Milan Slavický, and studied traditional Gyil in Ghana, with xylophonists Bernard Woma, Jerome Balsab, and Alfred Kpebesaane.

In 2021, Anjou graduated from the University of Sheffield with a master's degree in Music Psychology, Education and Wellbeing with merit. Her dissertation surveyed NYC jazz musicians' wellbeing and mental health in the pandemic. Her data and advocacy involvement with Music Workers Alliance helped New York legislators pass a $200M grant for independent artist workers in 2022.

== Music ==
Anjou has self-released many albums of original music ranging from piano trio, modern big band jazz, experimental improvisation, vibraphone, Ghanaian xylophone, hardcore, and feminist punk.

=== Enamiĝo Reciprokataj / Reciprocal Love (2019) ===
In February 2019, Anjou released her debut piano album Enamiĝo Reciprokataj, on Origin Records, a phrase in the Esperanto language meaning "falling in love reciprocated" or "mutual breakdown." The album features Greg Chudzik, Nick Anderson, Ben Perowsky, and Ari Folman-Cohen. The album received positive reviews from Downbeat Magazine, Amazon, All About Jazz, NYC Jazz Record, and France Musique. She has been called a "virtuosa" and "highly sophisticated".

=== Nong Voru / Fake Love (2021) ===
Anjou produced, co-performed, and released an album with Ghanaian xylophonist Alfred Kpebesaane entitled "Nong Voru", translated as "fake love" from Dagara. Released on Chant Records, it features songs of the gyil, a traditional 14-bar non-western tuned xylophone honoring the dead. The album explores the juxtaposition of the non-traditional Ghanaian tuning of the gyil and Western tuning of the Rhodes, microtonal Casio 1000P synthesizer, drums, microtonal electric bass, and Gleetchlab computer processing effects by electronic musician Michael Clemow.

The album was born out of her studies with Alfred while living in Ghana in 2006, their 2018 residency in NYC at Barbes known as "Ghanaian Gyil Gala", and performances at The Stone, Rockwood Music Hall, and The Owl Music Parlor.

=== The Shaggs and The Dot Wiggin Band ===
In 2012, Anjou began performing with members of The Shaggs, and helped to form, record and tour The Dot Wiggin Band, of which she is the co-vocalist, and frequently interviewed about. At the invitation of American band Wilco, The Shaggs performed at the 2017 Solid Sound Festival at Mass MoCA. Anjou supported as the stand-in bassist and vocalist with Dot and Betty Wiggin for their second time onstage together in over 46 years. The backing band included guitarist Richard Bennett (Friendly Bears), drummer Laura Cromwell, and guitarist Jesse Krakow (Time of Orchids, Shudder to Think).

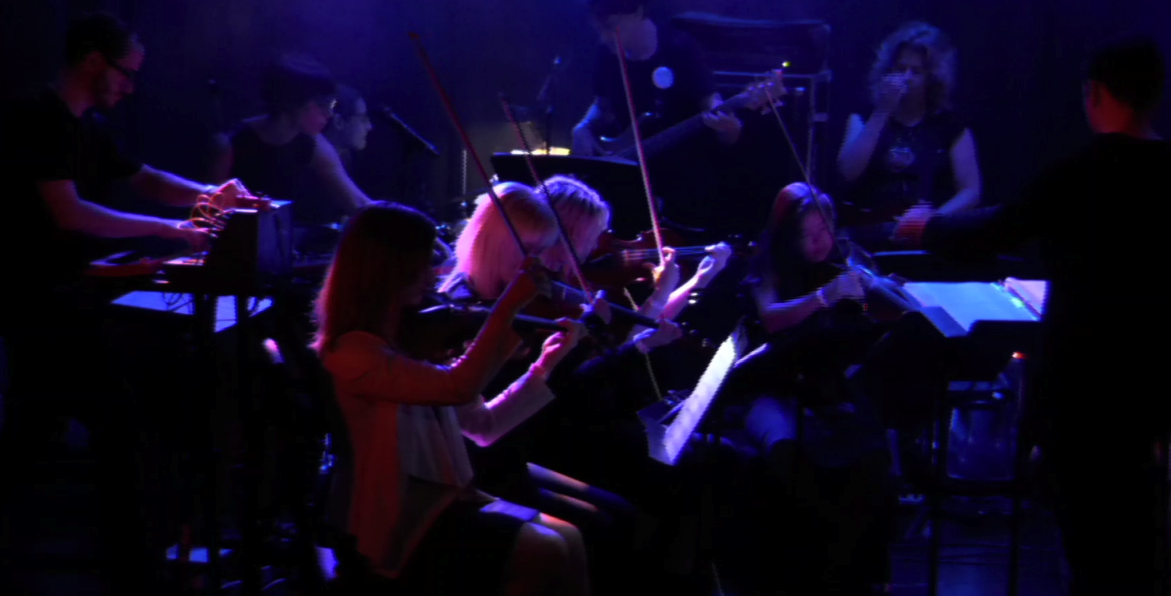
LARCENY Chamber Orchestra's Tribute to Portishead, live at Le Poisson Rouge, NYC, 2017

=== L.A.R.C.E.N.Y. ===
In 2013, Anjou founded and led the LARCENY Chamber Orchestra, a 30-member chamber ensemble that performed Anjou's arrangements and transcriptions of Portishead's Roseland NYC Live album at Le Poisson Rouge in NYC, complete with strings, horns, turntables, rhythm section, guest vocalists, using original sourced samples.

=== Other appearances ===
Anjou has recorded and toured as a pianist, keyboardist, vibraphonist, and background vocalist for The Shaggs, the Dot Wiggin Band, Ravens and Chimes, Elysian Fields, Oren Bloedow, Sophie Auster, Christeene Vale, Boshra Al Saadi, Brittain Ashford, and others. She performed at the Women Rock Rhodes Festival in LA in 2020 and 2021.

In 2016, Anjou composed a live score for the theater piece In the Eruptive Mode: Hijacked Voices of the Arab Spring, by Sulayman Al Bassam. The work premiered in Kuwait, followed by tours in Beirut, Tunis, Metz (France), Antwerp, and Boston from 2016-2018, and was reviewed positively by French and Arab press.

From 2018-2020, Anjou was the director of jazz and artist in residence at the JACC music school located in Kuwait’s Sheikh Jaber Al-Ahmad Cultural Center opera house.
