= The Spampinato Brothers =

American rock band

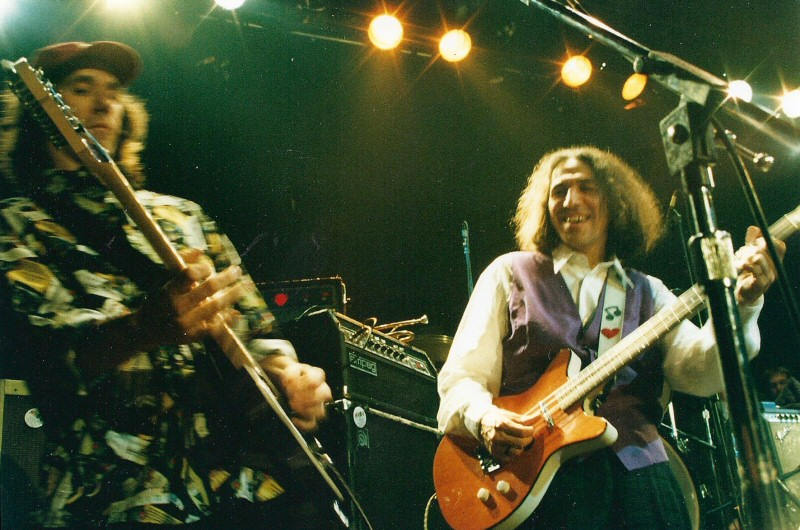
The Spampinato Brothers performing live in concert.

The Spampinato Brothers were a rock band from Cape Cod, Massachusetts. They played music combining a variety of styles including rockabilly, jazz rock, power pop, garage rock, alternative country, Americana music, country rock and folk rock.

The group features Joey Spampinato, a founding member, former singer, songwriter and bass player of NRBQ from 1967 to 2008. Spampinato is also known for his bass playing on numerous albums including Keith Richards' album “Talk Is Cheap”, Bonnie Raitt's “Fundamental”, and was one of the bassists on Eric Clapton's “24 Nights: Live From Albert Hall” in 1991. He appeared in the film “Hail, Hail Rock N’ Roll”, with rock legends Chuck Berry and Keith Richards. Spampinato's songs have been covered by Bonnie Raitt, Shakin' Stevens, Los Lobos, Dave Edmunds and others.

Joey Spampinato formed The Spampinato Brothers with his younger brother Johnny Spampinato (The Incredible Casuals), who toured, recorded and played lead guitar with NRBQ from 1994 until 2008. Johnny replaced NRBQ's previous guitarist Big Al Anderson, who left the group in 1994 to pursue a fruitful musical career as a respected songwriter, producer and session player in Nashville.

== The Spampinato Brothers in TV & Film ==
During their tenure with NRBQ, bandmates Joey Spampinato, Johnny Spampinato, Terry Adams and Tom Ardolino were featured in animated form on an episode of The Simpsons. The group served as the unofficial "house band" for The Simpsons for the season 10-12 period in which longtime NRBQ fan Mike Scully was head writer and executive producer. Several of NRBQ's songs were featured on The Simpsons, including "Mayonnaise and Marmalade", which was written specifically for the show. The band also appeared in non-animated form on camera during the end credits to perform the show's theme song during the episode "Take My Wife, Sleaze". NRBQ also recorded a song entitled "Birdman" for an episode of Space Ghost Coast to Coast entitled "Pilot". The same lineup also appeared in motion pictures, including Day of the Dead, Shakes the Clown, and 28 Days.

== New Projects ==
In 2011, The Spampinato Brothers released their first full-length album, entitled "Pie In The Sky," which featured eleven songs written by Joey and Johnny with input from the band's guitarist Aaron Spade and drummer J. Cournoyer. During 2012, The Spampinato Brothers embarked on a tour in Japan, showcasing their new material in addition to fan favorites from their years with NRBQ. In 2013, the band released a 6-song CD entitled "Smiles". Former Captain Beefheart guitarist Zoot Horn Rollo (Bill Harkleroad) is featured on the title track.

In 2019 and onward, Johnny Spampinato and the Value Leaders were touring regularly in Cape Cod, MA and elsewhere.

== Members ==
=== Current members ===
- Joey Spampinato – lead vocals, bass, guitar (2008–present on)
- Johnny Spampinato – lead guitar, vocals, keyboard, steel guitar (2008–present on)
- Aaron Spade – rhythm guitar, vocals, keyboard (2008–present on)
- J. Cournoyer – drums, percussion (2008–present on)
