= The Shaggs =

American rock band

- The Shaggs in 1968

Background information
- Origin: Fremont, New Hampshire, US
- Genre: Outsider music
- Years active: 1965–1975; 1999; 2017
- Labels: Third World; Fleetwood; Red Rooster; Rounder; RCA Victor; Light in the Attic
- Past members: Dorothy "Dot" Wiggin; Helen Wiggin; Betty Wiggin; Rachel Wiggin

The Shaggs were an American rock band formed in Fremont, New Hampshire, in 1965. They comprised the sisters Dorothy "Dot" Wiggin (vocals, lead guitar), Betty Wiggin (vocals, rhythm guitar), Helen Wiggin (drums) and, later, Rachel Wiggin (bass guitar). The Shaggs wrote seemingly simple and bizarre songs using untuned guitars, erratic rhythms, wandering melodies and rudimentary lyrics. Their only album, Philosophy of the World (1969), has been described as both among the worst of all time and as a work of unintentional brilliance.

The Shaggs formed at the insistence of their father, Austin Wiggin, who believed that his mother had predicted their rise to fame. For several years, he made them practice every day and perform weekly at the Fremont town hall. The girls had no interest in becoming musicians and never became proficient in songwriting or performing. In 1969, Austin paid for them to record their debut album, which was distributed in limited quantities in 1969 by a local record label. The Shaggs disbanded in 1975 after Austin's death.

Over the decades, Philosophy of the World circulated among musicians and found fans such as Frank Zappa, Lester Bangs and Kurt Cobain. A 1980 reissue on Rounder Records received enthusiastic reviews for its uniqueness in Rolling Stone and The Village Voice. According to Rolling Stone, the sisters sang like "lobotomized Trapp Family Singers", while the musician Terry Adams compared their music to the free jazz compositions of Ornette Coleman. A compilation of unreleased material, Shaggs' Own Thing, was released in 1982.

The Shaggs became the subject of fascination in the 1990s, when interest grew in outsider music, and they are credited with influencing twee pop. Dot and Betty reunited for shows in 1999 and 2017, organized by the musician Jesse Krakow. Helen died in 2006. With Krakow, Dot released an album as the Dot Wiggin Band in 2013, containing previously unrecorded Shaggs songs.

== History ==
=== 1965–1968: Formation and first years ===
The Shaggs were formed in 1965 by the teenage sisters Dorothy ("Dot"), Betty, and Helen Wiggin in the small town of Fremont, New Hampshire. Dot wrote the songs, played lead guitar and sang; Betty, the youngest, played rhythm guitar and sang; and Helen, the eldest, played drums. Their younger sister, Rachel, sometimes joined them on bass guitar.

The Shaggs formed at the behest of their father and manager, Austin Wiggin Jr. Austin worked as a mill hand in Exeter, and the family was poor. A Fremont local described him as a humorless man who rarely smiled. He did not allow the girls to attend concerts or have social lives, friends, or boyfriends. Betty said the girls "missed everything", and she fantasized about getting a car and leaving home. Some accounts indicated that the girls suffered parental abuse, and Helen said her father was once "inappropriately intimate" with her.

When Austin was young, his mother read his palm and made three predictions: he would marry a strawberry-blonde woman, he would have two sons after she had died, and his daughters would form a popular band. When the first two predictions proved accurate, Austin set about fulfilling the third. According to Dot, he occasionally had the family hold seances in an attempt to communicate with his mother. Dot later said the sisters thought their father was "nuts", but they did not want to do anything to insult their grandmother in his eyes. She said Austin had no interest in music and only created the band to fulfill the prediction. Their mother, Anne, supported their father and did not express her feelings.

Austin withdrew his daughters from school, bought them instruments and arranged for them to receive music and vocal lessons. He named them the Shaggs after the shag hairstyle, which was popular at the time, and in reference to the 1959 film The Shaggy Dog. He designed their schedule, with several hours of calisthenics and band practice every day. The sisters had no interest in becoming musicians and did not enjoy the rehearsals. Dot later said: "[Our father] was stubborn and he could be temperamental. He directed. We obeyed. Or did our best." Although Austin oversaw their rehearsals, he left the songwriting to the girls. Dot said later she would have been happier writing only lyrics. The girls sometimes went to the lake when Austin was out, then arranged their instruments to appear as if they had been practicing.

The Shaggs made their first public performance at a talent show in Exeter in 1968, which was met with mockery. Following a performance at a local nursing home, Austin arranged for the Shaggs to play at the Fremont town hall every weekend, joined sometimes by their brothers Austin III and Robert on percussion and drums. Their mother sold snacks. The shows attracted up to a hundred adolescents, who would heckle and throw junk. Rumors spread about the girls' controlling father, and Dot said Rachel, who attended high school, was bullied. The sisters felt they were poor musicians and found the performances embarrassing. Footage of one concert emerged in 2015, with the Shaggs playing from handwritten charts and performing rudimentary choreography.

=== 1969: Philosophy of the World ===
In March 1969, Austin took the Shaggs to record an album, Philosophy of the World, at Fleetwood Studios in Revere, Massachusetts. The studio was mainly used to record local rock groups and school marching bands. The sisters did not think they were ready to record, and one engineer recalled that they looked "miserable". Austin dismissed an engineer's opinion that they were not ready, saying: "I want to get them while they're hot." He insisted that their guitars did not need to be tuned as he had purchased them at Sears. One producer, Bobby Herne, recalled that the studio staff shut the control room doors and "rolled on the floor laughing" after they performed.

Philosophy of the World was recorded in a single day. Herne and another Fleetwood employee, Charlie Dreyer, were enlisted to remix the recordings. They hired session musicians to rerecord parts, but they were unable to follow the Shaggs' erratic tempos. Austin paid to have Dreyer's record company, Third World, press 1000 copies of the album. The liner notes, written by Austin, said the Shaggs "loved" making music and described them as "real, pure, unaffected by outside influences ... The Shaggs will not change their music or style to meet the whims of a frustrated world." The songs "My Pal Foot Foot" and "Things I Wonder" were released as a 45 rpm single on Fleetwood Records.

According to many accounts, Dreyer delivered only 100 copies of the album and disappeared with the remaining 900. Dot said that Dreyer had stolen her father's money and could not be traced. However, according to the music executive Harry Palmer, Dreyer said Austin had refused to distribute the extra copies because he feared someone would copy the Shaggs' music. Palmer said that Dreyer kept boxes of the records in the studio and would give them to anyone who asked. The journalist Irwin Chusid argued that it was unlikely Dreyer had stolen the records, as they were valueless at the time. The record producer Joe Chiccarelli, who had a teenage job at Fleetwood Studios, said he found boxes of the records while sweeping the studio basement. Philosophy of the World received no media coverage and the Shaggs resumed performing locally.

=== 1970s: Decline and disbandment ===
Palmer, who had been given several copies of Philosophy of the World by Dreyer, was intrigued and wondered if he could find the Shaggs an audience. In 1970 or 1971, he attended one of their Fremont performances and was amazed to see locals dancing awkwardly to the music. Palmer approached Austin about promoting the Shaggs, but stressed that people laughed at them and asked if this was a problem. Austin responded with resignation. Palmer decided he was in danger of exploiting the Shaggs as a freak show and did not pursue them.

In 1973, the Shaggs' weekly town hall shows were halted by the Fremont town supervisors. The sisters were relieved, as they were now adults and had tired of their father's control. When Austin discovered that Helen, then 28, had secretly married, he chased her husband with a shotgun. After the police intervened, Helen left the family home to be with her husband, but rejoined the band later.

In 1975, Austin took the Shaggs to Fleetwood Studios for another recording session. Though they had become more proficient through hundreds of hours of practice, the engineer wrote of their poor performances and felt sorry for them. He said they did not notice their out-of-tune guitars or disjointed rhythms when he played the recordings back to them. The recordings went unreleased.

Shortly after the recording session, Austin died of a heart attack, aged 47. The Shaggs disbanded and sold most of their equipment. A few years later, Betty and Dot married and moved out, and their mother sold the family house. The new owner became convinced that the house was haunted by Austin's ghost and donated it to the Fremont fire department, who burnt it down in a firefighting exercise. The Wiggin sisters had never profited from their music and took blue-collar jobs to support their families.

=== 1980s: Cult following and reissues ===
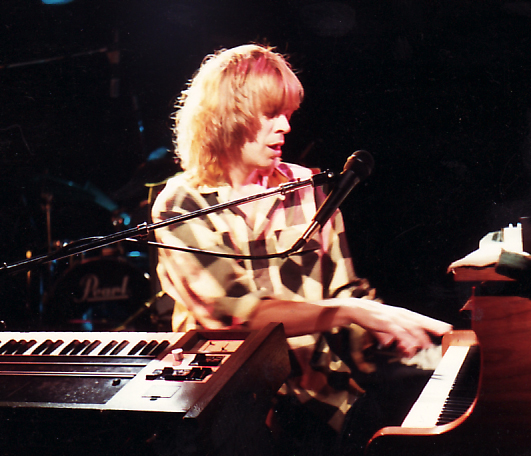
Terry Adams of the band NRBQ (pictured in 2007) became a fan of the Shaggs and helped reissue Philosophy of the World in 1980.

By the 1980s, copies of Philosophy of the World had circulated among musicians. It developed a cult following, with fans including Frank Zappa, Patti Smith, Bonnie Raitt, Jonathan Richman, Carla Bley and Terry Adams of NRBQ. Zappa is often quoted as having called the Shaggs "better than the Beatles", but this may be apocryphal. Tracks were played by the Boston radio station WBCN-FM.

Adams said he saw beauty and originality in the music, that it was "outside of the normal thinking process for songwriting at the time", and that there was an audience for it. He traced the Wiggin sisters and convinced them to reissue Philosophy of the World in 1980 under NRBQ's record label, Rounder Records. According to Adams, the sisters were hesitant to reissue the album and initially assumed they would have to pay for it themselves. They had no idea of the following it had attracted. According to the filmmaker Ken Kwapis, who later made a documentary about the Shaggs, Adams became their archivist.

Reviewing the reissue for Rolling Stone, Debra Rae Cohen described Philosophy of the World as "the sickest, most stunningly awful wonderful record I've heard in ages". In another Rolling Stone review that year, Chris Connelly suggested it was the worst album ever recorded. Rolling Stone awarded it their "Comeback of the Year" honor. In The Village Voice, Lester Bangs wrote: "How do they sound? Perfect! They can't play a lick! But mainly they got the right attitude, which is all rock 'n' roll's ever been about from day one." He wrote that Philosophy of the World could stand with albums by the Beatles, Bob Dylan and Teenage Jesus and the Jerks as "one of the landmarks of rock 'n' roll history". In 2004, Pitchfork observed that the Shaggs had been "embraced by the exact opposite audience Austin desired: the longhaired avant-garde intellectuals".

Adams and Ardolino curated a new release, the 1982 compilation Shaggs' Own Thing, comprising unreleased recordings made between 1969 and 1975. The title track is a duet between Austin and his eldest son, Robert. Pitchfork described it as "particularly disturbing" and unintentionally oedipal, noting that Austin sings of catching another man, his son, "doin' it" with "his girl". In 1988, Philosophy of the World and Shaggs' Own Thing were remastered and rereleased by Rounder Records as the compilation The Shaggs.

=== 1990s: Media attention and first reunion ===
In the 1990s, interest grew in outsider music (music created by self-taught or naïve musicians). The Nirvana frontman Kurt Cobain named the Shaggs as a favorite band. The Deadline writer Damon Wise said the trends of 1980s pop music, "over-produced and synthesized almost to death", had made Philosophy of the World more vulnerable to criticism. However, this endeared them to 1990s musicians such as Cobain, who were "more inclined to embrace noble failure than mindless success" following the "shallow" 1980s.

In 1999, RCA Victor reissued Philosophy of the World with the original cover and track listing. Joe Mozian, a vice president of marketing at RCA Victor, said: "It's so basic and innocent, the way the music business used to be. ... It is kind of a bad record—that's so obvious, it's a given. But it absolutely intrigued me, the idea that people would make a record playing the way they do." Despite the increasing interest in outsider music and airplay on college radio stations, the reissue sold poorly. Mozian speculated that "people are a little afraid of having the Shaggs in their record collections".

In 1999, The New Yorker ran a profile of the Shaggs by the staff writer Susan Orlean. Dot said she did not listen to their music or feel sentimental about it, and Betty was surprised that Orlean enjoyed it, saying, "God, it's horrible." The sisters did not like Orlean's article, and Dot objected that Orlean had written that Betty's hair was not in place. Soon after it was published, the actor Tom Cruise and his producing partner Paula Wagner optioned Orlean's article for a film.

As of 1999, Dot was working as a cleaner, Betty was a school janitor and a warehouse employee and Helen was living on disability benefits with severe depression. Only Dot remained musically active, playing handbells in a church choir and writing lyrics. That November, Dot and Betty performed four songs at NRBQ's 30th-anniversary celebration at the Bowery Ballroom in New York, with the NRBQ drummer Tom Ardolino filling in for Helen. The performance was attended by fans from around the world. Dot said later it was the first time she realized the following the Shaggs had amassed. Reviewing the performance for The Village Voice, Eric Weisbard wrote that Dot seemed comfortable in front of the audience but that Betty appeared nervous.

=== 2000s–present: Tributes and second reunion ===
In 2001, the label Animal World released Better than the Beatles, a tribute album with covers of Shaggs songs by acts including Ida, Optiganally Yours, R. Stevie Moore, Deerhoof and Danielson Famille. A stage musical about the Shaggs, Philosophy of the World, opened in New York City in 2011 in a co-production between Playwrights Horizons and New York Theatre Workshop. The New York Times described it as "quirky but dreary" and "hamstrung by tonal uncertainty", with the girls' lack of talent made clear but the script hesitant to "turn their lives into a loopy joke". Rounder Records reissued the Shaggs compilation in 2004. Helen died by suicide in 2006.

In 2012, Dot and Betty attended a Shaggs tribute show in Brooklyn organized by the musician Jesse Krakow. Krakow endeavoured to remain faithful to the recordings, saying, "Everybody says the Shaggs are impossible to play, but we're going to do it as is." After Krakow discovered that Dot had unrecorded Shaggs songs, he assembled a group, the Dot Wiggin Band, to record them with her. They released an album, Ready! Get! Go!, on Alternative Tentacles Records on October 29, 2013, and toured in support of Neutral Milk Hotel in April 2015. Dot said she had not been interested in recording and was only motivated by royalties. Philosophy of the World was reissued again in 2016 by Light in the Attic Records. By this point, original copies were selling for up to $10,000.

In 2017, Dot and Betty performed a reunion show at the Solid Sound Festival at the Massachusetts Museum of Contemporary Art, curated by the band Wilco. Their band comprised Krakow, Brittany Anjou and the drummer Laura Cromwell, who spent hours studying Helen's rhythms. Dot was disappointed that Krakow did not correct the mistakes in the music, but acknowledged that "everybody seems to like it the way it was". She and Betty sang but did not play instruments, and relied on cues from the band on when to come in. Cromwell said that Dot was "game" in rehearsals, but that Betty was passive and "bewildered". Dot said Betty only performed for the money, and Betty said she had no interest in performing again.

According to the musician Howard Fishman, reporting on the 2017 show for The New Yorker, the Wiggin sisters did not seem at ease on stage and did not engage much with the audience. He wrote that it was jarring to see them "being led through a zealous re-creation of music they'd never been particularly proud of". Though he acknowledged that Krakow and his band clearly respected the music, he asked: "What did it mean to celebrate a mistake? If accidental art is recreated on purpose, what is it?"

At the 2025 Edinburgh Festival Fringe, the theater company In Bed With My Brother performed Philosophy of the World, a play based on the Shaggs. It attacks the patriarchy and celebrates the Shaggs as "an inspirational failure to conform – whether by accident or design". It received positive reviews in The Guardian, The Telegraph and The Stage. As of 2026, Dot was no longer performing. She said she would not repeat her music career given the choice, but was proud of what the music had become and the following it had gained. A documentary by Ken Kwapis, We Are the Shaggs, premiered at the South by Southwest festival in March 2026. Asked what their father would think of the film, Betty replied that he would say: "I told you so."

== Style ==
A clip of "Who Are Parents?", released on the 1969 album Philosophy of the World

Though the Shaggs attempted to write traditional pop songs, they instead created unconventional music that many found unpleasant. They were unaware that their music was unusual and did not understand the critical discourse it attracted. NME described them as proto-punk, while Wise identified elements of surf music, girl group pop, rockabilly, lo-fi music and garage rock.

The Shaggs used incoherent chord progressions and played cheap Avalon guitars that were unintentionally out of tune. Their songs move unintentionally between different unconventional time signatures. Helen, the drummer, was often detached from her sisters' playing, and instead played rudiments she recalled from school drum lessons. Krakow identified unusual musical elements such as hemiola, decrescendos and ritardandos. The Shaggs' melodies, sung in unison, appear random; Adams compared them to the free jazz compositions of Ornette Coleman. Fishman wrote that Dot and Betty's vocals had a "sort of intuitive, spooky closeness" similar to sibling acts such as the Delmore Brothers and the Blue Sky Boys, while the Rolling Stone critic Debra Rae Cohen likened them to "lobotomized Trapp Family Singers".

Dot wrote lyrics based on her experiences, such as the disappearance of her cat and her longing for straight hair. The Vice writer Jennifer Park likened the lyrics to "dilapidated nursery rhymes, fables with overriding messages, and odd Christian songs". In Rolling Stone, Kory Grow wrote that while some Shaggs songs are happy, others "have an inexplicable sadness about them". Kwapis likened the lyrics to those of Brian Wilson.

Ron Eyre, the head of the international division of United Artists Records, likened Philosophy of the World to aboriginal music and music he had heard in China. The Pitchfork critic Quinn Moreland found the songs intriguing and catchy, and said that the "chaos is negated in the same way that after enough contemplation the violent splatters of a Jackson Pollock painting become calming". The musician Cub Koda observed an innocence in the Shaggs' music that he found "both charming and unsettling". The journalist Irwin Chusid described it as "100 percent authentic", free of irony or "self-conscious indie-rock trendiness".

After recording Philosophy of the World, the Shaggs' technique improved, though they never mastered their instruments. The Pitchfork critic David Moore characterized their later material, released on the compilation Shaggs' Own Thing, as "amateurish bubblegum country". Moreland felt it was "playful and free of anxiety", and that the covers of songs by acts including the Carpenters were "faithful, even graceful".

== Legacy ==
The Shaggs' music has been described as both among the worst of all time and a work of unintentional brilliance. The Guardian described them as "one of the most divisive bands in rock history, provoking wonder and horror in equal measure". Chusid noted that many listeners wondered if Philosophy of the World was the worst album ever recorded. Orlean wrote that "depending on whom you ask, the Shaggs were either the best band of all time or the worst ... Such a divergence of opinion confuses the mind." The LA Weekly critic Bruce D. Rhodewalt wrote: "If we can judge music on the basis of its honesty, originality and impact, then the Shaggs' Philosophy of the World is the greatest record ever recorded in the history of the universe." The Pitchfork critic Lindsay Zoladz said the Shaggs' music was "inscrutable" and challenged listeners to consider what good and bad music is. Koda said it would cause "any listener coming to this music to rearrange any pre-existing notions about the relationships between talent, originality, and ability".

The Shaggs are important to the history of outsider music (music created by self-taught or naïve musicians). Chusid described them as "the legendary—if unwitting—godmothers of outsider music". Alan McGee, the founder of Creation Records, wrote that they were "ground zero in the spurious world of outsider music" and "created possibilities" for unheard acts including Daniel Johnston and Wesley Willis. Moreland argued that the Shaggs were not outsider musicians, as outsider music "is meant to come from an undisturbed place". She quoted the art brut founder, Jean Dubuffet, who said: "[In outsider art] we are witness to the artistic operation in its pristine form, something unadulterated, something reinvented from scratch at all stages by its maker, who draws solely upon his private impulses." By contrast, Moreland noted that the Shaggs were forced to make music by their father. She identified a claustrophobia and trauma in their music that she argued was negated by calling them outsiders.

Pitchfork wrote that the Shaggs had "laid the groundwork" for the "faux-naivete" of twee pop. According to the journalist and musician Bob Stanley, they inspired "a wave of faux-naive groups", such as Beat Happening. Reviewing the Shaggs' 1999 reunion for The Village Voice, Eric Weisbard wrote that they now seemed less unusual, likening their out-of-tune guitars to Sonic Youth and their "mixture of repression and cutesiness" to Shonen Knife. He concluded that their music provided "rough sketches for the future of underground rock".

== Members ==
- Dorothy "Dot" Wiggin – vocals, lead guitar (1965–1975, 1999, 2017)
- Betty Wiggin – vocals, rhythm guitar (1965–1975, 1999, 2017)
- Helen Wiggin – drums (1965–1975; died 2006)
- Rachel Wiggin – bass guitar (1965–1975)

== Discography ==
=== Studio albums ===
- Philosophy of the World (1969)

=== Compilations ===
- Shaggs' Own Thing (1982)
- The Shaggs (1988)

=== Singles ===
- "My Pal Foot Foot" / "Things I Wonder" (1969)
- "Sweet Maria" / "The Missouri Waltz (Missouri State Song)" (2016)

=== Tribute albums ===
- Better than the Beatles (2001)

=== Various artists compilations ===
- Songs in the Key of Z – The Curious Universe of Outsider Music (2000)
