= Zoë Lewis =

English folk musician

Zoë Lewis is an English folk musician from Brighton, England.

== Discography ==
=== Albums ===
- Rotary Phone (2012)
- A Cure for the Hiccups (2008)
- Small Is Tremendous (2005)
- Fishbone, Wishbone, Funnybone (2001)
- Sheep (1998)
- Full of Faraway (1996)
- A Little Piece of Sky (1994) (cassette only)
