= Red Rooster Records =

- Founded: 1977
- Founder: The band NRBQ and Don Badgely
- Country of origin: United States

Red Rooster Records was a record label founded by the band NRBQ and Don Badgely in 1977. The band released their fifth album All Hopped Up on the label, following two albums each with Columbia Records (NRBQ and Boppin' the Blues) and Kama Sutra (Scraps and Workshop). It was distributed by Rounder Records until 1989, when the band signed with Virgin Records for their album Wild Weekend. The label folded into Rounder in 1990. This was the label that NRBQ would go back to after major label releases on Mercury Records (1977) and Bearsville Records (1983). The label also released The Shaggs' recordings during the late 1970s to late 80s. Besides "All Hopped Up", NRBQ albums on Red Rooster included "Kick Me Hard", "Tiddlywinks", "Tapdancin' Bats", "Lou & the Q" (with Captain Lou Albano) and "She Sings, They Play" (with Skeeter Davis). The label reissued the first Shaggs album, "Philosophy of the World" and then issued an album of previously unreleased Shaggs recordings called "Shaggs Own Thing". Red Rooster released singles by both NRBQ and Jake & the Family Jewels, as well as three extended play singles: "NRBQ Live", "Little Al" (featuring 4 songs performed by a pre-pubescent Al Anderson) and "Bax on Wax" (featuring 4 songs performed by Red Rooster cofounder Don Badgely AKA Baxter backed by NRBQ).

== See also ==
- List of record labels
