= The Incredible Casuals =

American rock band

The Incredible Casuals was an American rock band based in Cape Cod, Massachusetts. They were formed in 1980 by bassist and songwriter Chandler Travis, guitarist Steve Shook, drummer Rikki Bates (formerly known as Vince Valium), and guitarist Johnny Spampinato, brother of NRBQ's Joey Spampinato. The band has been described as "The Beach Boys meets the Who". The Incredible Casuals were created from the remnants of "Travis Shook and Club Wow", a comedy duo that opened for George Carlin, Martin Mull and others, appearing on The Tonight Show Starring Johnny Carson and The Midnight Special in the '70s.

Chandler Travis and Steve Shook were joined by drummer Rikki Bates in 1978 and began performing as The Incredible Casuals in the Boston area in 1980. The trio released two 45 rpm 7 inch singles, "Money Won't Buy You Happiness" and "That's Why" (Red Rooster Records) prior to the addition of Johnny Spampinato. Johnny joined NRBQ when Al Anderson left that band in 1994, but remained active with The Incredible Casuals. After the addition of Johnny to the band, the single "Picnic Ape" (Eat Records) was released. The revised lineup also released the "Let's Go" Maxi-EP, also on Eat records. This lineup of the band was also featured on the USA Network show "Hotspots" along with NRBQ.

Steve Shook left the group prior to the release of their first LP That's That (originally released on Demon Records in the UK and on Rounder Records in the U.S). Shook's songwriting and guitar are prominently featured on the album, which opens and closes with his compositions.

The band's final lineup included Spampinato, Bates, and Travis, as well as guitarist Aaron Spade, who wrote the songs "Burn Me Up" and "Tearin' My Hair Out". The Casuals maintained one constant through their career, playing the Beachcomber in Wellfleet, Cape Cod every summer Sunday afternoon since 1980. The band has composed over 100 songs.

The Incredible Casuals officially disbanded in 2013 after a highly celebrated three-decade run.

In 2023, original members Chandler Travis and Rikki Bates reteamed with guitarist Steve "Woo Woo" Wood to revive the music. Because they returned with a slightly altered power-trio lineup, they began touring under the modified name The Invincible Casuals.

Their song, "I Wanna Play Loud", was the theme song for most of the "Socky & Jamie" a weekly web show in the late 2000s and early 2010s..

== Discography ==
- That's That. Rounder, 1987 (CD release in Japan)
- Your Sounds. Sonic Trout, 1991
- Nature Calls. Iddy Biddy, 2005
- World Championship Songs: 1980-2007. Iddy Biddy, 2007
- It is Balloon. Akers Records
- The Future Will Be Better Tomorrow
