= Joey Spampinato =

American singer-songwriter

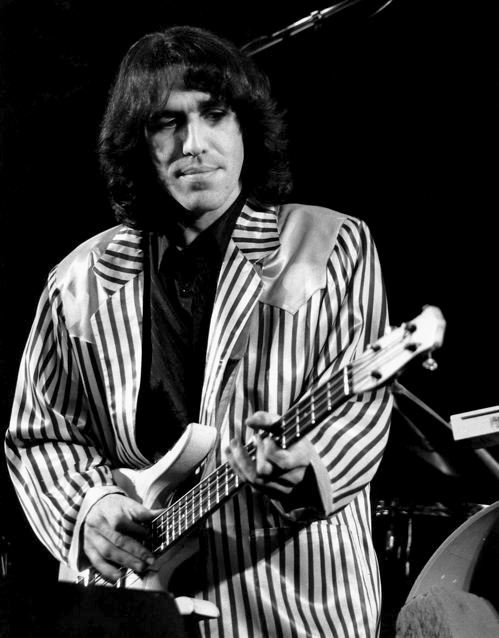

Background information
- Born: Joseph Nicholas Spampinato; August 16, 1948 (age 77); New York City, New York, U.S.
- Genres: Rock, power pop, jazz rock, rockabilly, garage rock, alternative country
- Occupation: Singer-songwriter
- Instruments: Vocals bass guitar
- Years active: 1967–present
- Label: Revolvo Records
- Website: www.spampinatobrothers.com

Joseph Nicholas Spampinato (born August 16, 1948) is a multi-instrumentalist and was a founding member and bass player of NRBQ. He was also one of the band's lead singers and chief songwriters. Before NRBQ he played in several bands, including The Seven of Us, which in 1967 while in Miami, Florida, met another band, The Mersey-Beats USA. The bands merged to form NRBQ. On the group's first two albums, NRBQ (Columbia, 1969) and Boppin' the Blues (With Carl Perkins, Columbia, 1970) Spampinato is credited as "Jody St. Nicholas".

== Biography ==
Spampinato was born in the Bronx borough of New York City. Musically, he was known for getting an acoustic, stand-up bass sound out of his instrument; he played bass on many albums including Keith Richards' album Talk Is Cheap, Bonnie Raitt's Fundamental, M. Ward's album A Wasteland Companion. and was one of the bassists on Eric Clapton's 24 Nights in 1991. His songs have been covered by Bonnie Raitt, Shakin' Stevens, Los Lobos, Dave Edmunds and others.

In 1986, Keith Richards of The Rolling Stones invited Spampinato to play in the band Richards put together to back up Chuck Berry for the rock legend's 60th birthday party concert, which was recorded for the 1987 documentary Hail! Hail! Rock 'n' Roll. NRBQ bandmate and co-founder Terry Adams wrote the song "Spampinato" in celebration of his friend's family name; the song appeared on the band's 1994 album Message for the Mess Age.

Spampinato appeared with NRBQ in several feature films and television shows. During his tenure with NRBQ, he and bandmates Johnny Spampinato, Adams and Tom Ardolino were featured in animated form on an episode of The Simpsons. The group served as the unofficial "house band" for The Simpsons for the season 10–12 period during which time longtime NRBQ fan Mike Scully was head writer and executive producer of the show. Several of NRBQ's songs were featured on The Simpsons, including "Mayonnaise and Marmalade", which was written specifically for the show. The band also appeared in non-animated form on camera during the end credits to perform the show's theme song during the episode "Take My Wife, Sleaze". NRBQ also recorded a song entitled "Birdman" for an episode of Space Ghost Coast to Coast entitled "Pilot". The same lineup also appeared in motion pictures, including Day of the Dead, Shakes the Clown, and 28 Days.

When the NRBQ stopped touring and recording in 2004 due to Adams's diagnosis of throat cancer, Spampinato and his brother, Johnny, continued for a short while with Tom Ardolino in the band Baby Macaroni. In 2008, Spampinato formed a new group called The Spampinato Brothers with his younger brother Johnny Spampinato, who himself toured, recorded and played lead guitar with NRBQ from 1994 until 2008. Johnny replaced NRBQ's previous guitarist Al Anderson, who left the group in 1994 to pursue a career as a songwriter, producer and session player in Nashville.

In 2011, The Spampinato Brothers announced the release of their new full-length album, entitled Pie in the Sky, which features eleven songs written by the brothers.

During 2012, The Spampinato Brothers embarked on a tour in Japan, showcasing their new material in addition to fan favorites from their years with NRBQ. In 2013, it was announced that they were finishing a new EP, Smiles, which was released later that year under the label Revolve Records.

In October 2015, Spampinato was diagnosed with cancer and was undergoing a long term treatment. In 2016, Cape Cod musician Sarah Burrell created a YouCaring fundraiser page to help with the anticipated expenses. While its intended goal was $50,000, it quickly surpassed that raising, as of February 2016, $90,830.

On June 25, 2021, True North Records released a fundraising tribute album, Party for Joey-A Sweet Relief Tribute to Joey Spampinato, as he was declared cancer-free.

== Personal life ==
Spampinato lives in Cape Cod, Massachusetts with his wife, Kami Lyle, a singer, songwriter and trumpeter. He was previously married to country singer Skeeter Davis.
