= NRBQ =

American rock band

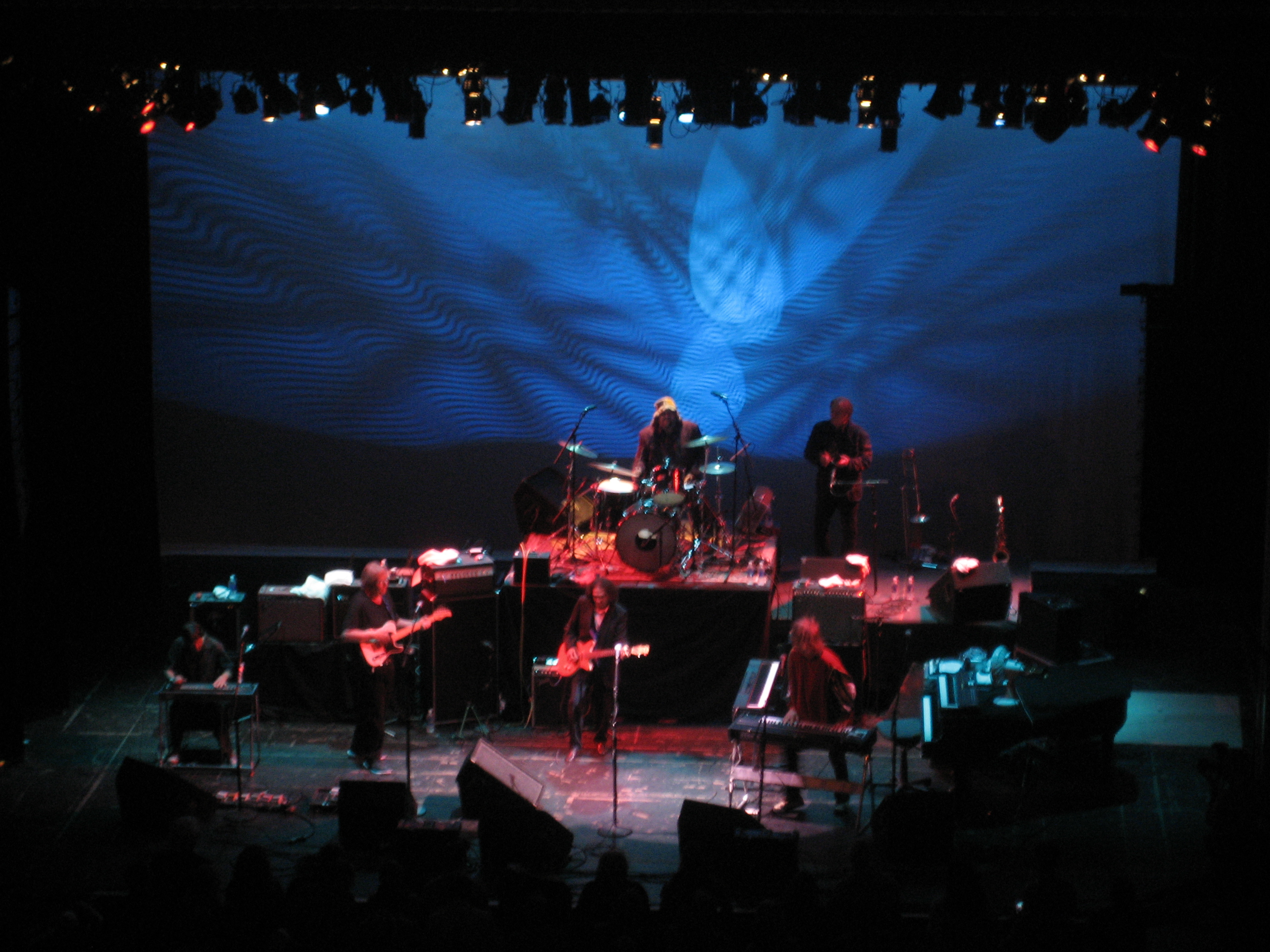
- NRBQ in 2007

Background information
- Origin: Louisville, Kentucky, U.S.
- Genres: Rock; pop; jazz; blues; country; folk; R&B
- Years active: 1966–2004, 2007, 2011–present
- Label: Various
- Members: Terry Adams; Scott Ligon; Casey McDonough; Jake Edwards
- Past members: Joey Spampinato; Tom Ardolino; Johnny Spampinato; Al Anderson; Steve Ferguson; Frank Gadler; Tom Staley; Ken Sheehan; Pete Donnelly; Conrad Choucroun; Bobby Lloyd Hicks; Joe Camarillo; John Perrin
- Website: www.nrbq.com

NRBQ is an American rock band founded by Terry Adams (piano), Steve Ferguson (guitar) and Joey Spampinato (bass). Originally the "New Rhythm and Blues Quintet", the group was formed circa 1965. Adams disbanded it for a time, and the group re-formed in 1967. The quartet is known for its live performances, containing a high degree of spontaneity and levity, and blending rock, pop, jazz, blues and Tin Pan Alley styles.

From 1974 to 1994, the band included pianist Adams, bassist Spampinato, guitarist Al Anderson, and drummer Tom Ardolino. This is considered the classic lineup of the group. Its current membership includes Adams, bassist Casey McDonough, guitarist Scott Ligon, and drummer Jake Edwards. Other members in the band's long history include guitarists Kenny Sheehan and Johnny Spampinato; drummers Tom Staley, Conrad Choucroun, Bobby Lloyd Hicks, Joe Camarillo and John Perrin; and vocalist Frank Gadler.

== History ==
NRBQ began in late 1965 as a rehearsal band in the Shively, Kentucky, home of brothers Terry and Donn Adams, and they appeared on stage for the first time in 1966. Along with drummer Charlie Craig, they made home tapes of their experiments. The first known reference to the band's name can be heard on one of these home tapes, with Donn announcing, "Here they are, the New Rhythm and Blues Quintet!" as though presenting them to a live audience.

In late spring of 1966, guitarist Steve Ferguson was invited to join NRBQ after he quit Mersey Beats USA (no relation to the Liverpool group who recorded "I Stand Accused"). He met Adams when the latter briefly joined the Mersey Beats USA to fill in for the regular keyboard player. After playing a few live dates in Louisville, Jimmy Orten (Soul Inc) was recruited on bass and vocals and the band left for Florida in late 1966.

In Miami, early January 1967, NRBQ played six nights at The Cheetah. Soon after, Orten and Ferguson returned to Louisville. Adams stayed behind and joined The Seven of Us, a band that was playing the same club. By August, the NRBQ was Adams (keyboards), Ferguson (guitar), Spampinato (bass) and Frank Gadler (vocals) from The Seven of Us, and Tom Staley (drums).

In December 1968, they began recording with Eddie Kramer at the Record Plant and by early 1969 were signed to a two-record deal with Columbia Records. Their self-titled debut album was released that year, with songs by both Eddie Cochran and Sun Ra, and a number of similarly wide-ranging originals. The following year, the group collaborated with rockabilly legend Carl Perkins on an album titled Boppin' the Blues.

Over the next three years, the band experienced personnel shifts, with the departure of Ferguson (replaced for one year by Ken Sheehan), Gadler, and Staley, and the arrival of two new members: guitarist/singer Al Anderson formerly of The Wildweeds, known for the Connecticut and Massachusetts regional hit "No Good To Cry", and drummer Tom Ardolino. The Adams / Spampinato / Anderson / Ardolino quartet stayed together longer than any other incarnation of the band (20 years, from 1974 until 1994), and was often augmented by the Whole Wheat Horns (Donn Adams, Keith Spring and others).

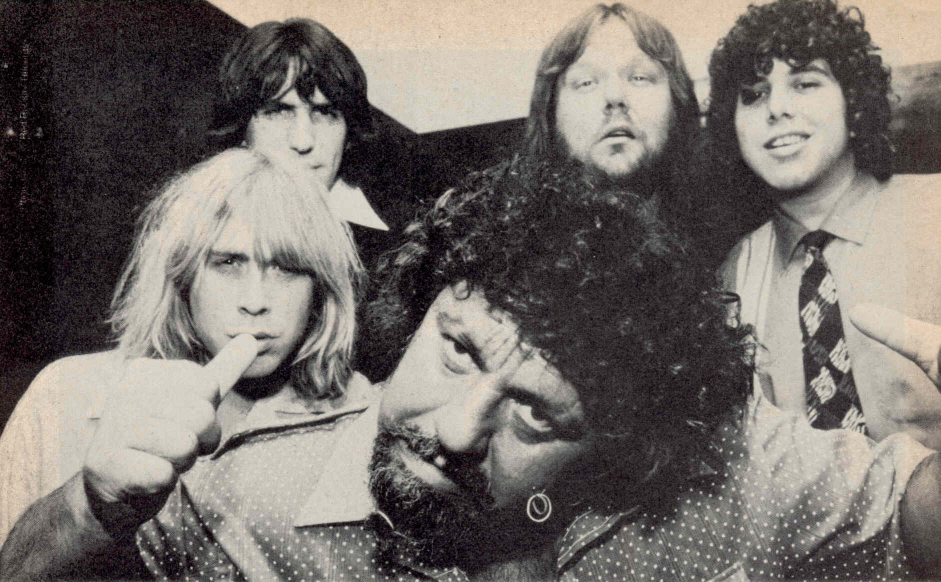
NRBQ with Lou Albano

Starting in September 1989, NRBQ opened for R.E.M. on the "Acronym Tour" with the first concert taking place on the 27th at the University of Dayton Arena. The last stop on the tour was at the Shoreline Amphitheater at Mountain View in Mountain View, California on October 21. Rolling Stone's Sam Freedman noted that the NRBQ played a compressed 30-minute club show. He also reported that both Mike Mills and Peter Buck of R.E.M. watched each of the NRBQ's opening sets during their portion of the tour from the edge of the stage "as if to endorse NRBQ for their fans".

In 1994 Anderson departed the group. He would become an award-winning Nashville songwriter for many country and western acts. He was replaced in NRBQ by Joey Spampinato's younger brother, Johnny Spampinato, who was (and still is) a member of power-pop band The Incredible Casuals.

On April 30 and May 1, 2004, the group celebrated its 35th anniversary with concerts at the Calvin Theater in Northampton, Massachusetts. The shows featured every former and current member of the band, as Ferguson, Gadler, Staley, Sheehan and Anderson returned for an NRBQ reunion.

== Hiatus and return ==
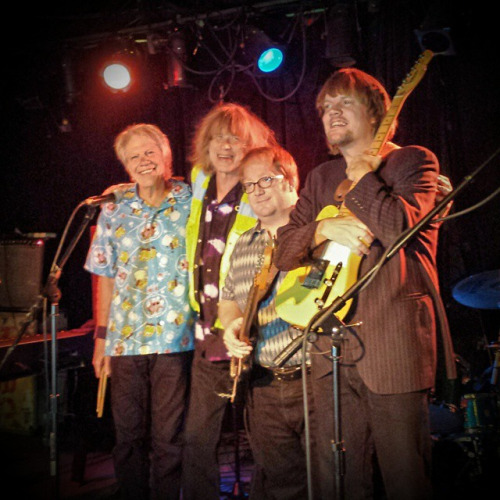
NRBQ at Jim Porter's Good Time Emporium, Louisville, KY, October 24, 2014 Left to right: Bobby Lloyd Hicks, Terry Adams, Casey McDonough and Scott Ligon

After the Halloween engagement at Shank Hall in Milwaukee in 2004, NRBQ went on hiatus. Adams had developed stage 4 throat cancer. During this time, Ardolino and the Spampinato brothers started playing shows as a trio, under the name "Baby Macaroni" and as the "Spampinato Bros.". After a number of months, Adams recovered and toured with former drummer Staley and Japanese rockabilly group the Hot Shots.

In June 2006, Adams and Ferguson released the album Louisville Sluggers (with Ardolino on drums, Pete Toigo on bass and other supporting musicians), and this album's lineup performed live shows in the U.S. and Japan as "The Terry Adams – Steve Ferguson Quartet" and "Rock & Roll Summit Meeting."

Also in September 2006 came the release of a SpongeBob SquarePants album, The Best Day Ever, which included backing music by all four NRBQ members, as well as Anderson. The album, a collection of '60s-influenced pop/rock produced by Andy Paley, and co-written by Paley and the voice of SpongeBob, Tom Kenny, also included such musical luminaries as Brian Wilson, Tommy Ramone, James Burton, Flaco Jiménez and Philadelphia DJ Jerry "The Geator" Blavat.

In November 2007, Adams formed "The Terry Adams Rock & Roll Quartet" with Scott Ligon on guitar and vocals, Pete Donnelly (of The Figgs) on bass and Conrad Choucroun and Ardolino on drums.

In March 2011, Adams posted an open letter to fans announcing that with the release of the upcoming album, Keep This Love Goin', this lineup would take on the NRBQ name. He also explained that while he did have tendinitis, the real reason for the hiatus was his treatment for cancer. In May 2012, the group released a live album, We Travel the Spaceways, on Clang! records.

During September 2012, bassist Donnelly was replaced by Scott Ligon's friend Casey McDonough. (As of 2021, Ligon and McDonough have also been members of the Flat Five, based in Chicago.)

In July 2013, NRBQ toured with drummer Joe Camarillo of The Waco Brothers and Hushdrops, where he recorded two songs on the Brass Tacks album: "Greetings from Delaware" and "I'm Not Here". Bobby Lloyd Hicks became the drummer from 2013 to 2015. He played on "Love In Outer Space" and "Let Go" from the 5-CD box set High Noon. John Perrin became the drummer in 2015.

Steve Ferguson died of cancer on October 7, 2009.

Tom Ardolino died on January 6, 2012, following a long illness.

Bobby Lloyd Hicks died of bronchiectasis on February 20, 2017.

Joe Camarillo died on January 24, 2021, of a stroke after contracting COVID-19.

== Reunion shows ==
On April 27 and 28 of 2007, NRBQ gave a pair of "38th Anniversary" performances in Northampton, Massachusetts, the first public NRBQ shows since 2004. Both Anderson and Johnny Spampinato appeared in the line-up, along with "Whole Wheat Horns" Donn Adams and Jim Bob Hoke, and guest appearances by John Sebastian, original NRBQ drummer Staley, and the band's former road manager Klem Klimek on saxophone. Gadler, former lead vocalist, also appeared.

== Style and influence ==
The band's music is a blend of styles from rockabilly to Beatles-influenced pop to Thelonious Monk-inspired jazz. They have attracted fans as diverse as Bob Dylan, Paul McCartney, Elvis Costello, Keith Richards, The Replacements, John Sebastian, Dave Edmunds, Yo La Tengo and Penn & Teller. NRBQ songs have been performed by Bonnie Raitt, Los Lobos, and Dave Edmunds among others. Also, the group served as the unofficial "house band" for The Simpsons for the season 10–12 period in which NRBQ fan Mike Scully was head writer and executive producer. NRBQ allowed several of their songs to be used on The Simpsons, including "Mayonnaise and Marmalade", written specifically for the show. The band also appeared in animated form and on camera during the end credits to perform the show's theme song during the episode "Take My Wife, Sleaze" and to perform Edmunds's cover of "Me & The Boys". The band also recorded a song entitled "Birdman" for an episode of Space Ghost Coast to Coast entitled "Pilot". The group appeared in feature films, including Day of the Dead, Shakes the Clown, and 28 Days. Their cover version of "Down in My Heart" appeared in the series finale of Wilfred.

NRBQ has a large following from decades of live shows. The band always performs without a set list which makes them, in the words of AllMusic's Mark Deming, "a stellar and wildly unpredictable live act." In addition to its own compositions, the band performs a broad range of cover material and audience requests.

In their nearly 50-year history, NRBQ's records have been released by many record companies, including Columbia Records, Kama Sutra Records, Mercury Records, Virgin Records, Rhino Entertainment, Rounder Records, and more. Their song "Get That Gasoline Blues" (on Kama Sutra) reached No. 70 in 1974 on the Billboard Hot 100 chart. Over the years, the group played sets while wearing pajamas, hired professional wrestling manager "Captain" Lou Albano as the band's manager (for whom they penned a song in tribute), and exploded Cabbage Patch Dolls on stage.

== Members ==
=== Current line-up ===
- Terry Adams – vocals, keyboards (1966–2004, 2007, 2011–present); occasional live drums (1974–2004, 2016–present)
- Scott Ligon – vocals, guitar (2011–present)
- Casey McDonough – vocals, bass (2012–present)
- Jake Edwards – drums (2025–present)

=== Former members ===
- Steve Ferguson – vocals, guitar (1966–1970, 1973–1974; guest 2004; died 2009)
- Joey Spampinato – vocals, bass (1967–2004, 2007)
- Tom Staley – drums (1968–1974; guest 2004, 2007)
- Frank Gadler – lead vocals (1967–1972; guest 2004, 2007)
- Joe Gallivan – drums (1968)
- Ken Sheehan – guitar (1970; guest 2004)
- Al Anderson – vocals, guitar (1971–1994, 2007; guest 2004)
- Tom Ardolino – vocals, drums (1974–2004, 2007; guest 2011; died 2012)
- Johnny Spampinato – vocals, guitar (1994–2004, 2007)
- Conrad Choucroun – drums (2011–2013)
- Pete Donnelly – vocals, bass (2011–2012)
- Joe Camarillo – drums (2013; died 2021)
- Bobby Lloyd Hicks – drums (2013–2015; died 2017)
- John Perrin - drums (2015–2025)

== Discography ==
=== Studio albums ===
- NRBQ (1969) (Columbia) 1969 No. 162 US; rereleased (Omnivore) 2018
- Boppin' the Blues (w/ Carl Perkins) (Columbia) 1970
- Scraps (Kama Sutra) 1972
- Workshop (Kama Sutra) 1973
- All Hopped Up (Red Rooster) 1977; rereleased (Omnivore) 2018
- At Yankee Stadium (Mercury) 1978
- Kick Me Hard (Rounder/Red Rooster) 1979
- Tiddlywinks (Rounder/Red Rooster) 1980
- Grooves in Orbit (Bearsville) 1983
- Tapdancin' Bats (Rounder/Red Rooster) 1983
- She Sings, They Play (w/ Skeeter Davis) (Rounder/Red Rooster) 1985
- Lou and the Q (w/ "Captain" Lou Albano) (Rounder/Red Rooster) 1986
- Wild Weekend (Virgin) 1989 No. 198 US
- Message for the Mess Age (Rhino) 1994
- You're Nice People You Are (Rounder) 1997
- Christmas Wish (Rounder) 1997
- NRBQ (sometimes known as "The Yellow Album") (Rounder) 1999
- Atsa My Band (Edisun) 2002
- Dummy (Edisun) 2004
- Keep This Love Goin' (Clang!) 2011
- Brass Tacks (Clang!) 2014
- Happy Talk [5 song EP] (Omnivore) 2017
- April Showers [3 song EP] (Omnivore) 2018
- Dragnet (Omnivore) 2021
- Grooves in Orbit [reissue with bonus tracks] (Omnivore) 2026

=== Live albums ===
- God Bless Us All (Rounder) 1987
- Diggin' Uncle Q (Rounder) 1988
- Honest Dollar (Rykodisc) 1992
- Tokyo (Rounder) 1996
- You Gotta Be Loose (Rounder) 1998
- Live from Mountain Stage (Live performances from the Mountain Stage radio show) (Blue Plate) 2002
- Live at the Wax Museum (previously unreleased concert from 1982, with guest John Sebastian) (Edisun) 2003
- Froggy's Favorites Vol. 1 (compilation of unreleased live tracks 1979–1999) (Edisun) 2006
- Ludlow Garage 1970 (previously unreleased concert from 1970) (Sundazed) 2006
- We Travel the Spaceways (Clang!) 2012
- Talk Thelonious (Euclid Records) 2015
- Turn On, Tune In (Omnivore) 2019
- NRBQ at the Ardmore Music Hall 2015 (arQive) 2020
- NRBQ & the Whole Wheat Horns Park West 83 (arQive) 2022

=== Compilations ===
- RC Cola and a Moon Pie (Rounder/Red Rooster) 1986
- Uncommon Denominators (Rounder-era compilation covering 1972 through 1984) (Rounder) 1987
- Kick Me Hard — The Deluxe Edition (reissue, w/ 8 bonus tracks) (Rounder) 1989
- Peek-A-Boo (multi-label compilation covering 1969 through 1989) (Rhino) 1990
- Stay with We (compilation of Columbia years, w/ unreleased songs) (Columbia/Legacy) 1993
- Tapdancin' Bats — The Anniversary Edition (reissue, w/ 4 bonus tracks) (Rounder) 1998
- Ridin' in My Car (reissue of All Hopped Up, w/ unreleased songs) (Rounder) 1999
- Scraps (reissue, remastered, w/ 3 bonus tracks) (Rounder) 2000
- Scraps Companion (15 tracks from radio show from Memphis in 1972 and 6 outtakes from Scraps sessions) (Edisun) 2000
- Music's Been Good to You (18 previously unreleased tracks (studio & live) between 1975 - 2001) (Edison) 2002
- Transmissions (2-disc Japan-only compilation featuring about 40 percent unissued material) (Caraway) 2004
- Christmas Wish — Deluxe Version (Clang!) 2007
- High Noon: A 50-Year Retrospective [106-track 5-CD version] (Omnivore) 2016
- High Noon: A 50-Year Retrospective [17-track digital version] (Omnivore) 2016
- High Noon: A 50-Year Retrospective [26-track 2-LP version] (Omnivore) 2017
- In • Frequencies (Omnivore) 2020

=== Singles ===
- "Stomp / I Didn't Know Myself" (Columbia) 1969 No. 122 US
- "C'mon Everybody / Rocket Number 9" (Columbia) 1969
- "Down In My Heart / Sure To Fall (In Love With You)" (Columbia) 1969
- "All Mama's Children / Step Aside" (with Carl Perkins) (Columbia) 1970
- "Howard Johnson's Got His Ho-Jo Workin' / Only You" (Kama Sutra) 1972
- "Magnet / Do You Feel It?" (Kama Sutra) 1972
- "C'mon If You're Comin' / RC And A Moon Pie" (Kama Sutra) 1973
- "Get That Gasoline Blues / Mona" (Kama Sutra) 1973 No. 70 US
- "Rumors / Sourpuss" (Select-O-Hit) 1974
- "Ridin' In My Car / Do The Bump" (Red Rooster) 1977
- "I Got A Rocket In My Pocket / Tapdancin' Bats" (Red Rooster) 1977
- "I Love Her, She Loves Me / Green Lights" (Mercury) 1978
- "Hot Biscuits And Sweet Marie / Don't She Look Good" (Red Rooster/Rounder) 1979
- "Get That Gasoline / Wacky Tobacky" (Red Rooster/Rounder) 1979 No. 105 US Cashbox
- "Me And The Boys / People" (Red Rooster/Rounder) 1980
- "Christmas Wish / Jolly Old St. Nicholas" (Red Rooster/Rounder) 1980
- "Never Take The Place Of You / Radio Spot / TV Spot" (Red Rooster/Rounder) 1980
- "Captain Lou / Boardin' House Pie" (W/ Captain Lou Albano) (Red Rooster) 1982
- "Rain At The Drive-In / Smackaroo" (Instrumental) (Bearsville) 1983
- "Wild Weekend / This Love Is True" (Virgin) 1989
- "If I Don't Have You" (Virgin) 1989
- "A Little Bit Of Bad / Tom Dooley" (Forward) 1994
- "Over Your Head / Blues Stay Away From Me / Spampinato" (Forward) 1994
- "Careful What You Ask For" (Rounder) 1999
- "Everybody Say Yeah! / Hornin' In" (Euclid) 2012
- "Never Cop Out / Scram! It's The Fuzz" (B-side By Los Straitjackets) (Spinout) 2016
- "Do The Primal Thing" (Extended Version) (Omnivore) 2020
- "I'm Not Here / All I Have To Do Is Dream" (Folc) 2021
