= Terry Adams (musician) =

American musician (born 1948)

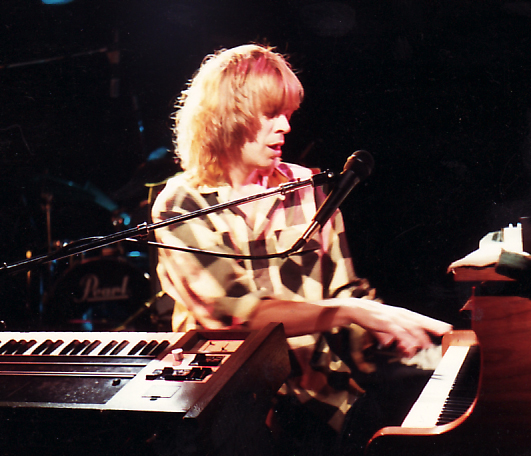
- Adams performing with NRBQ in 2007

Background information
- Born: August 14, 1948 (age 77)
- Genres: Rock; jazz; blues; R&B; folk
- Occupations: Musician; composer
- Instruments: Piano; vocals
- Works: See discography section
- Member of: NRBQ
- Formerly of: The Minus 5

Terry Adams (born August 14, 1948) is an American musician and composer. He is a founding member of the band NRBQ (New Rhythm and Blues Quintet/Quartet), which was formed in 1965.

Adams was born in Louisville, Kentucky, where he met fellow resident Steve Ferguson, a singer and guitarist who also became a charter member of NRBQ. His younger brother, Donn Adams, has served the band in various support roles, including originally coining the NRBQ name, playing the trombone (as part of the "Whole Wheat Horn" section), and writing liner notes.

The Los Angeles Times once attempted to sum up his musical approach: "If Adams has often been likened to a cross between Jerry Lee Lewis and Thelonious Monk, it is only because the image is so apt. He perfectly combines Lewis’ fiery recklessness with the spare freedom and novel chordings of Monk's work."

== Career ==
While Adams spent his early musical years playing in various rock and R&B groups in and around Louisville, he and Ferguson eventually arrived in Florida, where they met up with three other musicians (singer/bassist Joey Spampinato, drummer Tom Staley, and singer Frank Gadler) who joined them to launch NRBQ in 1967. The group relocated to the northeast, and a recording contract with Columbia Records followed soon thereafter. However, most of NRBQ's subsequent recorded works have been released on smaller, independent labels. Although the group has made personnel changes over the years, Adams has remained in the lineup throughout the band's history. The band worked almost constantly, either in the studio or on the road, from their formation until 2004, when the group went on a hiatus for several years, interrupted only by a few select concert dates. After NRBQ stopped performing, Adams continued to record and tour as a solo artist and with other musicians. 2006 saw the release of Louisville Sluggers, a collaboration with former bandmate Ferguson, and an accompanying tour. Afterward, Adams released Rhythm Spell and Holy Tweet, and began touring with his new group, the Terry Adams Rock & Roll Quartet. In a March 2011 letter to his fans on NRBQ.com, Adams revealed that in 2004 he had been diagnosed with stage 4 throat cancer, which was, at the time of the letter, in remission. In the same letter, Adams also announced the rebranding of his quartet as the new NRBQ. The band's members are Adams, Scott Ligon on guitar and vocals, Casey McDonough on bass and vocals, and John Perrin on drums. (As of 2024, Ligon and McDonough are also members of the Flat Five, based in Chicago.)

Adams has focused much of his career on playing, writing, and singing with NRBQ, but he has found time to devote to other projects, including the discovery and production of the musically untrained sisters comprising The Shaggs; live and recorded work with jazz composer Carla Bley's band in the 1970s; collaborations with spoken word artist David Greenberger; solo recordings and performances; a duet recording with alto saxophonist Marshall Allen (known for his long career with the Sun Ra Arkestra); and the recent performances and recordings described above.

Adams also released a solo jazz album, Terrible, in 1995.

== Discography ==
=== Solo ===
- Terrible (New World Records) 1995
- Ten by Two (Edisun Records) 2005
- Louisville Sluggers (Clang) 2006
- Rhythm Spell (Clang) 2007
- Love Letter to Andromeda (Clang) 2008
- Holy Tweet (Clang) 2009
- Crazy 8's (Clang) The Terry Adams Rock & Roll Quartet, 2010
- Talk Thelonious (Clang) 2015
