= Hank Locklin discography =

- Studio albums: 29
- Compilation albums: 10
- Singles: 96
- Other charted songs: 2
- Box sets: 2
- Other album appearances: 1

The discography of American country singer-songwriter Hank Locklin contains 29 studio albums, 10 compilation albums, two box sets, 96 singles, two additionally-charting songs and one album appearance. He had his first hit with "The Same Sweet Girl" (1949) after signing with 4 Star Records. The song reached the top ten of the Billboard country singles chart, peaking at number eight. A string of singles were released over the next several years that were not successful. With a leasing agreement administered by Decca Records, he had his next hit in 1953 with the number one song, "Let Me Be the One." Disappointed by label management, he switched to RCA Victor Records in 1955. Under the production of Chet Atkins, he had his biggest success. His next hit came with 1956's "Why Baby Why," which reached number nine on the country chart. Between 1957 and 1958, he had three top-ten country hits: "Send Me the Pillow You Dream On," "Geisha Girl" and "It's a Little More Like Heaven." In 1958, he recorded country music's first concept albums, Foreign Love. In 1960, Locklin released his biggest hit single, "Please Help Me, I'm Falling." Not only did it top the Billboard country singles chart, but it also reached number eight on the Billboard Hot 100 list. It was also one of several hits Locklin had in the United Kingdom, peaking at number nine on their pop chart.

Locklin had several more Billboard country hit singles in the early 1960s. This included "One Step Ahead of My Past," "Happy Birthday to Me" and "Happy Journey." He also released several more concept studio albums, beginning with a tribute album to Roy Acuff and an album of Irish recordings. His studio releases also began appearing on the Billboard Top Country Albums chart, beginning with The Girls Get Prettier in 1966. In 1968, he had his last top ten hit with "The Country Hall of Fame." As the decade progressed, his singles continued charting, yet went into lower-end song positions. In 1968 and 1969 he had his final top 40 singles on the country chart. His final album to peak on the country albums chart was 1969's Softly. He remained with RCA records until the early 1970s and released several more studio albums. This included a collaboration with Danny Davis on an album of brass instrumentation. In the latter part of the 70s, he recorded studio albums for two separate labels. In 2001, he released his first studio offering in many years titled Generations in Song. This was followed in 2006 by his final album, a collection of gospel tunes called By the Grace of God.

== Albums ==
=== Studio albums ===
List of studio albums, with selected chart positions, and other relevant details
Title	Album details	Peak chart positions
Title	Album details	US Country
Foreign Love	Released: January 1958; Label: RCA Victor; Formats: LP	—
Please Help Me, I'm Falling	Released: July 1960; Label: RCA Victor; Formats: LP	—
Happy Journey	Released: January 1962; Label: RCA Victor; Formats: LP	—
A Tribute to Roy Acuff: The King of Country Music	Released: February 1962; Label: RCA Victor; Formats: LP	—
Hank Locklin	Released: March 1962; Label: RCA Camden; Formats: LP	—
This Song Is Just for You	Released: May 1963; Label: RCA Camden; Formats: LP	—
The Ways of Life	Released: July 1963; Label: RCA Victor; Formats: LP	—
Irish Songs, Country Style	Released: January 1964; Label: RCA Victor; Formats: LP	—
Hank Locklin Sings Hank Williams	Released: September 1964; Label: RCA Victor; Formats: LP	—
Hank Locklin Sings Eddy Arnold	Released: June 1965; Label: RCA Victor; Formats: LP	—
My Kind of Country Music	Released: September 1965; Label: RCA Camden; Formats: LP	—
Once Over Lightly	Released: November 1965; Label: RCA Victor; Formats: LP	—
The Girls Get Prettier	Released: May 1966; Label: RCA Victor; Formats: LP	26
The Gloryland Way	Released: August 1966; Label: RCA Victor; Formats: LP	—
Send Me the Pillow You Dream On and Other Great Country Hits	Released: March 1967; Label: RCA Victor; Formats: LP	—
Nashville Women	Released: August 1967; Label: RCA Victor; Formats: LP	36
Country Hall of Fame	Released: February 1968; Label: RCA Victor; Formats: LP	20
My Love Song for You	Released: August 1968; Label: RCA Victor; Formats: LP	40
Softly	Released: December 1968; Label: RCA Victor; Formats: LP	32
Lookin' Back	Released: July 1969; Label: RCA Victor; Formats: LP	—
Hank Locklin & Danny Davis & the Nashville Brass (with Danny Davis and the Nashville Brass)	Released: March 1970; Label: RCA Victor; Formats: LP	—
Bless Her Heart...I Love Her	Released: August 1970; Label: RCA Victor; Formats: LP	—
The Mayor of McLellan, Florida	Released: November 1972; Label: RCA Victor; Formats: LP	—
Hank Locklin	Released: June 1975; Label: MGM; Formats: LP	—
There Never Was a Time	Released: 1977; Label: Plantation; Formats: LP	—
Country Hall of Fame	Released: 1978; Label: Top Spin; Formats: LP	—
All Kinds of Everything	Released: 1979; Label: Top Spin; Formats: LP	—
Generations in Song	Released: 2001; Label: Coldwater; Formats: CD	—
By the Grace of God: The Gospel Album	Released: September 26, 2006; Label: Yell; Formats: CD	—
"—" denotes a recording that did not chart or was not released in that territory.

=== Compilation albums ===
List of albums, showing all relevant details
Title	Album details
3 Country Gentlemen (with Hank Snow and Porter Wagoner)	Released: 1963; Label: RCA Victor; Formats: LP
The Best of Hank Locklin	Released: August 1966; Label: RCA Victor; Formats: LP
That's How Much I Love You	Released: 1968; Label: RCA Camden; Formats: LP
Wabash Cannon Ball	Released: 1969; Label: RCA Camden; Formats: LP
Candy Kisses	Released: November 1970; Label: RCA Camden; Formats: LP
The First Fifteen Years	Released: 1971; Label: RCA Victor; Formats: LP
Send Me the Pillow You Dream On	Released: 1973; Label: RCA Camden; Formats: LP
20 of the Best	Released: 1982; Label: RCA International; Formats: LP
The Very Best of Hank Locklin	Released: October 21, 1996; Label: Hallmark; Formats: CD
RCA Country Legends	Released: March 4, 2003; Label: RCA; Formats: CD

=== Box sets ===
List of albums, showing all relevant details
Title	Album details
Please Help Me I'm Falling	Released: December 1995; Label: Bear Family; Formats: CD
Send Me the Pillow You Dream On	Released: 1997; Label: Bear Family; Formats: CD

== Singles ==
=== As lead artist ===
List of singles, with selected chart positions, showing other relevant details
Title	Year	Peak chart positions					Album
Title	Year	US	US Coun.	AUS	NLD	UK	Album
"Rio Grande Waltz"	1948	—	—	—	—	—	non-album singles
"Please Come Back and Stay"	1949	—	—	—	—	—	non-album singles
"I Worship You"	1949	—	—	—	—	—	non-album singles
"The Same Sweet Girl"	1949	—	8	—	—	—	non-album singles
"Born to Ramble" (Note: Credited as "Hank Locklin and the Rocky Mountain Playboys.")	1949	—	—	—	—	—	non-album singles
"Send Me the Pillow You Dream On" (Note: Credited as "Hank Locklin and the Rocky Mountain Playboys.")	1949	—	—	—	—	—	non-album singles
"Our Love Will Show the Way"	1949	—	—	—	—	—	non-album singles
"Are You Treating Your Neighbor as Yourself" (Note: Credited as "Hank Locklin and the Rocky Mountain Playboys.")	1950	—	—	—	—	—	non-album singles
"Midnight Tears" (Note: Credited as "Hank Locklin and the Rocky Mountain Playboys.")	1950	—	—	—	—	—	non-album singles
"Pinball Millionaire" (Note: Credited as "Hank Locklin and the Rocky Mountain Playboys.")	1950	—	—	—	—	—	non-album singles
"Come Share the Sunshine with Me" (Note: Credited as "Hank Locklin and the Rocky Mountain Playboys.")	1950	—	—	—	—	—	non-album singles
"The Holy Train" (Note: Credited as "Hank Locklin and the Rocky Mountain Playboys.")	1950	—	—	—	—	—	non-album singles
"Tho I've Lost" (Note: Credited as "Hank Locklin and the Rocky Mountain Playboys.")	1950	—	—	—	—	—	non-album singles
"Year of Time" (Note: Credited as "Hank Locklin and the Rocky Mountain Playboys.")	1950	—	—	—	—	—	non-album singles
"The Song of the Whispering Leaves" (Note: Credited as "Hank Locklin and the Rocky Mountain Playboys.")	1951	—	—	—	—	—	non-album singles
"Your House of Love Won't Stand" (Note: Credited as "Hank Locklin and the Rocky Mountain Playboys.")	1951	—	—	—	—	—	non-album singles
"Send Me the Pillow You Dream On #2"	1951	—	—	—	—	—	non-album singles
"Crazy Over You"	1951	—	—	—	—	—	non-album singles
"Stumpy Joe"	1951	—	—	—	—	—	non-album singles
"Tomorrow's Just Another Day to Cry"	1952	—	—	—	—	—	non-album singles
"Down Texas Way"	1952	—	—	—	—	—	non-album singles
"Harvest Is Ripe"	1952	—	—	—	—	—	non-album singles
"Who Is Knocking at My Heart"	1952	—	—	—	—	—	non-album singles
"Golden Wristwatch"	1953	—	—	—	—	—	non-album singles
"I Like to Play with Your Kisses"	1953	—	—	—	—	—	non-album singles
"Crazy Over You"	1953	—	—	—	—	—	non-album singles
"I Can't Run Away"	1953	—	—	—	—	—	non-album singles
"Let Me Be the One"	1953	—	1	—	—	—	non-album singles
"Mysteries of Life"	1954	—	—	—	—	—	non-album singles
"Baby You Can Count on Me"	1954	—	—	—	—	—	non-album singles
"Your Heart Is an Island"	1955	—	—	—	—	—	My Kind of Country Music
"Let Me Confess"	1955	—	—	—	—	—	non-album singles
"Who Am I to Cast the First Stone"	1955	—	—	—	—	—	non-album singles
"Empty Bottle, Empty Bottle"	1955	—	—	—	—	—	non-album singles
"Why Baby Why"	1955	—	9	—	—	—	non-album singles
"A Good Woman's Love"	1956	—	—	—	—	—	Hank Locklin (1962)
"Seven or Eleven"	1956	—	—	—	—	—	Hank Locklin (1962)
"She's Better Than Most"	1956	—	—	—	—	—	Hank Locklin (1962)
"Fourteen Karat Gold"	1957	—	—	—	—	—	Hank Locklin (1962)
"(I'm So Tired Of) Goin' Home All By Myself"	1957	—	—	—	—	—	non-album single
"Geisha Girl"	1957	66	4	—	—	—	Foreign Love
"Send Me the Pillow That You Dream On" (Note: "Send Me the Pillow That You Dream On" was re-recorded when Locklin was contracted under RCA Victor Records. The 1957 version was the hit single.)	1957	77	5	—	4	—	Please Help Me, I'm Falling
"It's a Little More Like Heaven"	1958	—	3	—	—	—	Please Help Me, I'm Falling
"The Upper Room"	1958	—	—	—	—	—	The Gloryland Way
"I Gotta Talk to Your Heart"	1958	—	—	—	—	—	This Song Is Just for You
"Foreign Car"	1959	—	—	—	—	—	Please Help Me, I'm Falling
"Border of the Blues"	1959	—	—	—	—	—	This Song Is Just for You
"Blues In Advance"	1959	—	—	—	—	—	Please Help Me, I'm Falling
"Please Help Me, I'm Falling"	1960	8	1	22	9	9	Please Help Me, I'm Falling
"One Step Ahead of My Past"	1960	—	14	—	—	—	This Song Is Just for You
"From Here to There to You"	1961	—	12	—	—	44	Hank Locklin (1962)
"You're the Reason"	1961	— (Note: "You're the Reason" peaked at number 7 on the Billboard Bubbling Under Hot 100 singles chart, a list which acts as a 25-song extension of the Hot 100.)	14	66	—	—	Happy Journey
"Happy Journey"	1961	—	10	—	—	—	Happy Journey
"We're Gonna Go Fishin'"	1962	—	14	—	—	18	The Ways of Life
"Wabash Cannonball"	1962	—	—	—	—	—	A Tribute to Roy Acuff: The King of Country Music
"Flyin' South"	1963	—	23	—	—	—	non-album single
"Wooden Soldier"	1963	—	41	—	—	—	My Kind of Country Music
"Followed Closely by My Teardrops"	1964	—	15	—	—	—	non-album single
"I Was Coming Home to You"	1964	—	—	—	—	—	My Kind of Country Music
"I'm Blue"	1965	—	—	—	—	—	My Kind of Country Music
"Forty Nine, Fifty One"	1965	—	32	—	—	—	non-album single
"The Girls Get Prettier (Every Day)"	1965	—	35	—	—	—	The Girls Get Prettier
"Insurance"	1966	—	48	—	—	—	non-album single
"There's More Pretty Girls Than One"	1966	—	—	—	—	—	The Girls Get Prettier
"The Best Part of Loving You"	1966	—	69	—	—	—	Nashville Women
"Hasta Luego (See You Later)"	1967	—	41	—	—	—	Nashville Women
"Nashville Women"	1967	—	73	—	—	—	Nashville Women
"The Country Hall of Fame"	1967	—	8	—	—	—	Country Hall of Fame (1968)
"Love Song for You"	1968	—	40	—	—	—	My Love Song for You
"Everlasting Love"	1968	—	57	—	—	—	non-album single
"Lovin' You (The Way I Do)"	1968	—	62	—	—	—	My Love Song for You
"Where the Blue of the Night Meets the Gold of the Day"	1969	—	35	—	—	—	Softly
"Jeannie"	1969	—	—	—	—	—	The Mayor of McLellan, Florida
"Bless Her Heart...I Love Her"	1970	—	68	—	—	—	Bless Her Heart...I Love Her
"She's as Close as I Get to Loving You"	1971	—	61	—	—	—	The Mayor of McLellan, Florida
"Only a Fool"	1971	—	—	—	—	—	The Mayor of McLellan, Florida
"Softly"	1971	—	—	—	—	—	non-album singles
"Love Has a Mind of Its Own"	1972	—	—	—	—	—	non-album singles
"I Forgot to Live Today"	1972	—	—	—	—	—	non-album singles
"Goodbye Dear Ole Ryman"	1972	—	—	—	—	—	non-album singles
"Before My Time"	1973	—	—	—	—	—	non-album singles
"Jonas P. Jones"	1973	—	—	—	—	—	non-album singles
"Sweet Inspiration"	1974	—	—	—	—	—	non-album singles
"Send Me Your Coffee Cup"	1974	—	—	—	—	—	Hank Locklin (1975)
"The Sweetest Mistake"	1975	—	—	—	—	—	Hank Locklin (1975)
"Irish Eyes"	1975	—	—	—	—	—	Hank Locklin (1975)
"Baby I Need You"	1976	—	—	—	—	—	There Never Was a Time
"Daytime Love Affair"	1976	—	—	—	—	—	There Never Was a Time
"You Love Me Don't 'Cha"	1976	—	—	—	—	—	There Never Was a Time
"There Never Was a Time"	1977	—	—	—	—	—	There Never Was a Time
"The Upper Room"	1978	—	—	—	—	—	All Kinds of Everything
"Turning Point in Life"	1992	—	—	—	—	—	non-album single
"—" denotes a recording that did not chart or was not released in that territory.

=== As a collaborative artist ===
List of singles, with selected chart positions, showing other relevant details
Title	Year	Peak chart positions	Album
Title	Year	US Country	Album
"Chet's Tune" (credited as "Some of Chet's Friends")	1967	38	non-album single
"Please Help Me, I'm Falling" (with Danny Davis and the Nashville Brass)	1969	68	Hank Locklin & Danny Davis & the Nashville Brass
"Flying South" (with Danny Davis and the Nashville Brass)	1970	56	Hank Locklin & Danny Davis & the Nashville Brass
"Hello Dolly" (with Carol Channing and Jimmy C. Newman)	1977	—	non-album single
"—" denotes a recording that did not chart or was not released in that territory.

== Other charted songs ==
List of singles, with selected chart positions, showing other relevant details
Title	Year	Peak chart positions		Album	Notes
Title	Year	US Coun.	UK	Album	Notes
"Happy Birthday to Me"	1961	7	—	Happy Journey	(Note: "Happy Birthday to Me" was released as the B-side to the 1961 single, "You're the Reason.")
"I Feel a Cry Coming On"	1966	—	29	Nashville Women	(Note: "I Feel a Cry Coming On" was released originally as the B-side to the 1966 single, "Insurance," which charted in the United States.)
"—" denotes a recording that did not chart or was not released in that territory.

== Other album appearances ==
List of non-single guest appearances, with other performing artists, showing year released and album name
Title	Year	Other artist(s)	Album	Ref.
"Rudolph the Red-Nosed Reindeer"	1973	—	Christmas in the Country	
