= The Best of Hank Locklin =

Compilation album by Hank Locklin
- Released: August 1966
- Genre: Country; Nashville Sound
- Label: RCA Victor
- Producer: Chet Atkins

Hank Locklin chronology
| The Gloryland Way (1966) | The Best of Hank Locklin (1966) | Send Me the Pillow You Dream On and Other Great Country Hits (1967) |

The Best of Hank Locklin is a compilation album by American country singer–songwriter Hank Locklin. It was released in August 1966 via RCA Victor Records and contained 12 tracks of re-released material. The album was a collection of Locklin's biggest hit songs up to that point. It was his second compilation record for the RCA Victor label. The album received positive reviews following its release.

== Background, release and reception ==
After Hank Locklin signed with RCA Victor Records in the late 1950s, he had his greatest commercial success. He had several major hits with songs like "Send Me the Pillow You Dream On," "Geisha Girl" and the crossover hit "Please Help Me, I'm Falling". RCA released a series of studio recordings during the 1960s following his success. The Best of Hank Locklin was his first compilation release for the label.

The compilation contained a total of 12 tracks. Contained on the album were Locklin's previous hits "Please Help Me, I'm Falling", "Send Me the Pillow You Dream On", "Geisha Girl", "It's a Little More Like Heaven", "From Here to There to You", "Happy Journey", "Flying South", and a remake of 1953's "Let Me Be the One." Other tracks on the album were not originally released as a singles, with the exception of "I Was Coming Home to You".

The Best of Hank Locklin was released in August 1966. It was Locklin's second compilation album issued in his career and his second with RCA Victor. The album was issued as a vinyl LP, containing six tracks on both sides. It received a 2.5 star rating from Eugene Chadbourne of AllMusic, who considered some of the album's tracks to be "bloated by choruses and string sections." Nonetheless, he concluded the review positively by saying, "Some listeners may find the Locklin repertoire a bit on the sentimental side; the point is, he had both the voice and the passion to pull off this kind of material – even "Danny Boy." This is a nice collection; the four Locklin collections advertised on the back cover are even better bets."

== Track listing ==
Side one
| No. | Title | Writer(s) | Length |
|---|---|---|---|
| 1. | "Please Help Me, I'm Falling" | Hal Blair; Don Robertson | 2:20 |
| 2. | "I Was Coming Home to You" | Kendall Hayes; Jimmy Rule | 2:29 |
| 3. | "Danny Boy" | Frederic Weatherly | 2:24 |
| 4. | "Happy Journey" | Charles Nowa; Fred Jacobson; Nicola Wilke | 2:31 |
| 5. | "Fraulein" | Lawton Williams | 2:32 |
| 6. | "Flying South" | Cindy Walker | 2:02 |

Side two
| No. | Title | Writer(s) | Length |
|---|---|---|---|
| 1. | "Send Me the Pillow You Dream On" | Hank Locklin | 2:26 |
| 2. | "Geisha Girl" | Williams | 2:07 |
| 3. | "From Here to There to You" | Pete McKinlay | 2:20 |
| 4. | "It's a Little More Like Heaven" | Hoyt Atkins; Jimmy Atkins | 2:32 |
| 5. | "The Old Bog Road" | Teresa Brayton | 2:57 |
| 6. | "Let Me Be the One" | Paul Blevins; Joe Hobson; W.S. Stevenson | 2:17 |

== Release history ==
| Region | Date | Format | Label | Ref. |
|---|---|---|---|---|
| Canada | August 1966 | Vinyl | RCA Victor | |
| United States | August 1966 | Vinyl | RCA Victor | |
| United Kingdom | 1972 | Vinyl | RCA Victor | |
