= Once Over Lightly (Hank Locklin album) =

Studio album (re-recording) by Hank Locklin
- Released: November 1965
- Recorded: August 1965
- Studio: RCA Victor Studio
- Genre: Country; Nashville Sound
- Label: RCA Victor
- Producer: Bob Ferguson

Hank Locklin chronology
My Kind of Country Music (1965)	Once Over Lightly (1965)	The Girls Get Prettier (1966)

Once Over Lightly is a re-recorded studio album by American country singer–songwriter Hank Locklin. It was released in November 1965 via RCA Victor Records and was produced by Bob Ferguson. Once Over Lightly was a concept studio album that included 24 songs that were made shorter in length. It was Locklin's twelfth studio album as well.

== Background and content ==
Once Over Lightly was one of several concept albums released by Hank Locklin during his career. Like his previous concept releases, Once Over Lightly focused around a particular theme. Consisting of 24 songs, Locklin re-recorded many of his former hit singles in what the liner considered to be a "compact arrangement." The original song lengths were shortened so that each track was under two minutes length. Among the re-recorded hits by Locklin on the album were "Send Me the Pillow (That You Dream On)," "Geisha Girl" and "Please Help Me, I'm Falling." In addition, Locklin recorded shorter versions of songs first made famous by other country artists. Among the record's cover tunes was Johnny Cash's "I Walk the Line," Hank Snow's "I Don't Hurt Anymore" and Brenda Lee's "Fool No. 1." Once Over Lightly was recorded at the RCA Victor Studio in August 1965. The recording sessions were produced by Bob Ferguson. It was Locklin's first album to be fully produced by Ferguson, who had previously co-produced a studio release of Locklin's.

== Release and reception ==
Professional ratings
Review scores
Source	Rating
Allmusic	3/5 stars
Billboard	Favorable

Once Over Lightly was released in November 1965 on RCA Victor Records. It was Locklin's twelfth studio album in his recording career. It was originally distributed as a vinyl LP. Each LP had 12 songs in total on both sides of the record. It was later re-issued on a digital and streaming format in the 2010s. The project did not spawn any known singles upon its release. Once Over Lightly received a favorable response from writers of Billboard magazine in 1965, who called it "a powerful package." It later years, it received three out of five stars from Allmusic. The online publication also named four of the record's tracks to be "album picks." This included "Geisha Girl" and "Please Help Me, I'm Falling."

== Track listing ==
=== Vinyl version ===
Side one
No.	Title	Writer(s)	Length
1.	"Send Me the Pillow You Dream On"	Hank Locklin	1:13
2.	"The Same Sweet Girl"	Locklin	1:12
3.	"Fraulein"	Lawton Williams	1:10
4.	"Flying South"	Cindy Walker	1:09
5.	"I Walk the Line"	Johnny Cash	1:10
6.	"I Don't Hurt Anymore"	Don Robertson; Jack Rollins	3:56
7.	"Tennessee Border"	Jimmy Work	1:00
8.	"The Wild Side of Life"	Arlie Carter; William Warren	1:02
9.	"Loose Talk"	Freddie Hart; Anne Lucas	1:02
10.	"Before I'm Over You"	Betty Sue Perry	1:12
11.	"Geisha Girl"	Williams	1:02
12.	"Fool No. 1"	Kathryn R. Fulton	1:02

Side two
No.	Title	Writer(s)	Length
1.	"Please Help Me, I'm Falling"	Hal Blair; Robertson	1:15
2.	"Back Street Affair"	Jimmy Rule; Billy Wallace	1:10
3.	"Shame on You"	Spade Cooley	1:04
4.	"My Shoes Keep Walking Back to You"	Lee Ross; Bob Wills	1:06
5.	"I'll Be There (If You Ever Want Me)"	Rusty Gabbard; Ray Price	1:02
6.	"Together Again"	Buck Owens	1:15
7.	"Act Naturally"	Voni Morrison; Johnny Russell	1:07
8.	"From Here to There to You"	Pete McKinlay	1:12
9.	"Let Me Be the One"	Paul Blevins; Joe Hobson; W.S. Stevenson	1:08
10.	"Faith and Truth"	Locklin	1:15
11.	"This Song Is Just for You"	Cecil Harris; Perk Williams	1:14
12.	"No One Is Sweeter Than You"	Locklin	1:08

=== Digital version ===
Once Over Lightly
No.	Title	Writer(s)	Length
1.	"Send Me the Pillow You Dream On"	Locklin	1:19
2.	"The Same Sweet Girl"	Locklin	1:17
3.	"Fraulein"	Williams	1:16
4.	"Flying South"	Walker	1:12
5.	"I Walk the Line"	Cash	1:14
6.	"I Don't Hurt Anymore"	Don Robertson; Rollins	1:20
7.	"Tennessee Border"	Work	1:03
8.	"The Wild Side of Life"	Carter; Warren	1:10
9.	"Loose Talk"	Hart; Lucas	1:04
10.	"Before I'm Over You"	Perry	1:14
11.	"Geisha Girl"	Williams	1:10
12.	"Fool No. 1"	Fulton	1:12
13.	"Please Help Me, I'm Falling"	Blair; Robertson	1:21
14.	"Back Street Affair"	Rule; Wallace	1:15
15.	"Shame on You"	Cooley	1:07
16.	"My Shoes Keep Walking Back to You"	Ross; Wills	1:06
17.	"I'll Be There (If You Ever Want Me)"	Gabbard; Price	1:12
18.	"Together Again"	Owens	1:22
19.	"Act Naturally"	Morrison; Russell	1:10
20.	"From Here to There to You"	McKinlay	1:16
21.	"Let Me Be the One"	Blevins; Hobson; Stevenson	1:12
22.	"Faith and Truth"	Locklin	1:20
23.	"This Song Is Just for You"	Harris; Williams	1:17
24.	"No One Is Sweeter Than You"	Locklin	1:08

== Personnel ==
All credits are adapted from the liner notes of Once Over Lightly.

Musical and technical personnel

- Bob Ferguson – producer
- Hank Locklin – lead vocals
- William Vandevort – recording engineer

== Release history ==
Region	Date	Format	Label	Ref.
Canada	November 1965	Vinyl	RCA Victor	
United Kingdom	1966	Vinyl	RCA Victor	
United States	November 1965	Vinyl	RCA Victor	
United States	2010s	Digital; Streaming	Sony Music Entertainment	
