= Lookin' Back (Hank Locklin album) =

Studio album by Hank Locklin
- Released: July 1969
- Recorded: April 1969
- Studio: RCA Victor Studio
- Genre: Country; Nashville Sound
- Label: RCA Victor
- Producer: Danny Davis

Hank Locklin chronology
Softly (1968)	Lookin' Back (1969)	Hank Locklin & Danny Davis & the Nashville Brass (1970)

Lookin' Back is a studio album by American country singer–songwriter Hank Locklin. It was released in July 1969 via RCA Victor Records and contained 11 tracks. The project was produced by Danny Davis and contained no single releases. Lookin' Back centered around cover songs by country and pop artists of the era. It was Locklin's twentieth studio album release in his career.

== Background and content ==
Hank Locklin had several years of major commercial success with RCA Victor Records with hits like "Geisha Girl," "Please Help Me, I'm Falling" and "Happy Birthday to Me." After one final major hit in 1968, Locklin's success began to wane on the popularity charts. In 1969, he had his final top 40 single, yet continued releasing studio albums on RCA's label. Lookin' Back was an album of covers first recorded by other artists in the country and pop genres. A total of 11 cover songs were included on the record. It featured covers of country hits of the time, such as Jim Reeves' "He'll Have to Go," Jimmy C. Newman's "Cry, Cry, Darling" and Locklin's cover of his original 1953 hit, "Let Me Be the One." Covers of pop songs included Guy Mitchell's "My Heart Cries for You" and the pop standard "When I Grow Too Old to Dream." Lookin' Back was recorded at the RCA Victor Studio in April 1969. It was produced by Danny Davis.

== Release and reception ==
Professional ratings
Review scores
Source	Rating
Allmusic	2/5 stars
Billboard	Favorable

Lookin' Back was released in July 1969 on RCA Victor Records, making it Locklin's twentieth studio album. It was originally distributed as a vinyl LP, containing six songs on "side A" and five songs on "side B." It was eventually re-released to digital markets in the 2010s, such as Apple Music. No singles were spawned from the album. It also did not chart on the Billboard Top Country Albums list, Locklin's first album not to make the list since 1965. Lookin' Back received mixed reviews from writers and critics. Billboard magazine positively commented on it in their 1969 review, calling Locklin "smooth and compelling as ever." Thom Owens of Allmusic gave the album only two stars in his review: "Though Hank Locklin is in fine voice throughout Lookin' Back, the LP is burdened by too many average songs and overblown production that makes the record a frustrating listen."

== Track listing ==
=== Vinyl version ===
Side one
No.	Title	Writer(s)	Original artist(s)	Length
1.	"Cry, Cry, Darling"	J.D. Miller; Jimmy C. Newman	Jimmy C. Newman	2:55
2.	"He'll Have to Go"	Audrey Allison; Joe Allison	Jim Reeves	2:45
3.	"My Blue Heaven"	Walter Donaldson; George A. Whiting	Gene Austin	2:30
4.	"Almost"	Vic McAlpin; Jack Toombs	George Morgan	2:59
5.	"When I Lost You"	Irving Berlin	Henry Burr	2:46
6.	"When I Grow Too Old to Dream"	Oscar Hammerstein II; Sigmund Romberg	Evelyn Laye; Ramon Novarro	3:07

Side two
No.	Title	Writer(s)	Original artist(s)	Length
1.	"My Heart Cries for You"	Percy Faith; Carl Sigman	Guy Mitchell	3:05
2.	"My Melancholy Baby"	Ernie Burnett; George A. Norton	William Frawley	2:51
3.	"Let Me Be the One"	Paul Blevins; Joe Hobson; W.S. Stevenson	Hank Locklin	2:39
4.	"I Don't Know Why"	Fred E. Ahlert; Roy Turk	Russ Columbo	2:58
5.	"She Thinks I Still Care"	Steve Duffy; Dickey Lee	George Jones	3:15

=== Digital version ===
Lookin' Back
No.	Title	Writer(s)	Original artist(s)	Length
1.	"Cry, Cry, Darling"	J.D. Miller; Jimmy C. Newman	Jimmy C. Newman	2:53
2.	"He'll Have to Go"	Audrey Allison; Joe Allison	Jim Reeves	2:44
3.	"My Blue Heaven"	Walter Donaldson; George A. Whiting	Gene Austin	2:28
4.	"Almost"	Vic McAlpin; Jack Toombs	George Morgan	3:00
5.	"When I Lost You"	Irving Berlin	Henry Burr	2:46
6.	"When I Grow Too Old to Dream"	Oscar Hammerstein II; Sigmund Romberg	Evelyn Laye; Ramon Novarro	3:07
7.	"My Heart Cries for You"	Percy Faith; Carl Sigman	Guy Mitchell	3:05
8.	"My Melancholy Baby"	Ernie Burnett; George A. Norton	William Frawley	2:52
9.	"Let Me Be the One"	Paul Blevins; Joe Hobson; W.S. Stevenson	Hank Locklin	2:36
10.	"I Don't Know Why"	Fred E. Ahlert; Roy Turk	Russ Columbo	3:00
11.	"She Thinks I Still Care"	Steve Duffy; Dickey Lee	George Jones	3:15

== Personnel ==
All credits are adapted from the liner notes of Lookin' Back.

Musical and technical personnel

- Danny Davis – producer
- The Jordanaires – background vocals
- Hank Locklin – lead vocals
- Bill McElhiney – arrangement
- Tom Pick – engineer
- Roy Shockley – assistant engineer
- Lawton Williams – liner notes

== Release history ==
Region	Date	Format	Label	Ref.
New Zealand	July 1969	Vinyl	RCA Victor	
United States	July 1969	Vinyl	RCA Victor	
United States	2010s	Digital; Streaming	Sony Music Entertainment	
