= Hank Locklin & Danny Davis & the Nashville Brass =

Studio album by: Hank Locklin; Danny Davis; Nashville Brass
- Released: March 1970
- Genre: Country; Nashville Sound
- Length: 28:20
- Label: RCA Victor
- Producer: Danny Davis

Hank Locklin chronology
Lookin' Back (1969)	Hank Locklin & Danny Davis & the Nashville Brass (1970)	Bless Her Heart...I Love Her (1970)

Danny Davis chronology
Down Homers (1969)	Hank Locklin & Danny Davis & the Nashville Brass (1970)	Somethin' Else (1971)

Singles from Hank Locklin & Danny Davis & the Nashville Brass
- 1. "Please Help Me, I'm Falling" Released: November 1969; 2. "Flying South" Released: April 1970

Hank Locklin & Danny Davis & the Nashville Brass is a studio album by American country music artist Hank Locklin, American record producer Danny Davis and session band named the Nashville Brass. It was released in March 1970 via RCA Victor Records and was produced by Davis as well. Consisting of 11 tracks, the album featured re-recordings of former hits and songs by other artists. It included brass instrumentation by the Nashville Brass session group. It also spawned two singles between 1969 and 1970.

== Background and content ==
Hank Locklin had major success in the early 1960s with the hits "Geisha Girl," "Please Help Me, I'm Falling" and "Happy Birthday to Me." His popularity on the radio began to wane in the late 1960s. In 1969, he had his final top 40 single, yet continued releasing studio albums on RCA's label.

For Hank Locklin & Danny Davis & the Nashville Brass, Locklin collaborated with producer and musician Danny Davis. Davis had previously produced albums for Locklin during the late 1960s. It was also his first collaboration with the Nashville Brass, a studio group founded by Davis. The album contained a total of eleven tracks. It featured re-recordings of former hits by Locklin, such as 1960's "Please Help Me, I'm Falling" and "Send Me the Pillow You Dream On." Also included were cover versions of Connie Smith's "Once a Day," Bill Monroe's "Blue Moon of Kentucky" and Leon Ashley's "Laura (What's He Got That I Ain't Got)." The project was recorded at the Nashville Sound Studio and was produced by Davis.

== Release and reception ==
Hank Locklin & Danny Davis & the Nashville Brass was released in March 1970 via RCA Victor Records. With its release, it became Locklin's twenty first studio album issued in his career. It was originally distributed as a vinyl LP, containing six songs on "side one" and five songs on "side two." The project spawned two singles between 1969 and 1970. The first was Locklin's re-recording of "Please Help Me, I'm Falling," which was issued on RCA in November 1969. It later peaked at number 68 on the Billboard Hot Country Songs chart.It was followed in April 1970 by Locklin's re-recording of "Flying South."

The single spent six weeks on the Billboard country list before peaking at number 56 in July 1970. The album received a mixed review from Thom Owens of Allmusic, who gave it three stars. He found Locklin and Davis' collaboration to be "an awkward fusion." However, he found other tracks to fit the album's concept such as "Once a Day" and "Blue Moon of Kentucky."

== Track listing ==
Side one
No.	Title	Writer(s)	Original artist(s)	Length
1.	"Flying South"	Cindy Walker	Hank Locklin	1:56
2.	"Melody of Love"	Hans Engelmann; Tom Glazer	Billy Vaughn	2:41
3.	"Rosalita"	Al Dexter	Al Dexter	2:18
4.	"Laura (What's He Got That I Ain't Got)"	Leon Ashley; Margie Singleton	Leon Ashley	2:54
5.	"Please Help Me, I'm Falling"	Hal Blair; Don Robertson	Hank Locklin	2:55
6.	"Once a Day"	Bill Anderson	Connie Smith	2:27

Side two
No.	Title	Writer(s)	Original artist(s)	Length
1.	"Blue Moon of Kentucky"	Bill Monroe	Bill Monroe	2:28
2.	"Little Acorns"	Arthur Kent	Hank Locklin	2:00
3.	"One Minute Past Eternity"	Stanley Kesler; William E. Taylor	Jerry Lee Lewis	2:33
4.	"Send Me the Pillow You Dream On"	Hank Locklin	Hank Locklin	2:42
5.	"Anna"	Locklin	Hank Locklin	4:05
Total length:				28:20

== Personnel ==
All credits are adapted from the liner notes of Hank Locklin & Danny Davis & the Nashville Brass.

Musical and technical personnel

- Danny Davis – producer
- Hank Locklin – lead vocals
- Bill McElhiney – arrangement

== Release history ==
Region	Date	Format	Label	Ref.
Canada	March 1970	Vinyl	RCA Victor	
United States	March 1970	Vinyl	RCA Victor	
