= The Mayor of McLellan, Florida =

Studio album by Hank Locklin
- Released: November 1972
- Recorded: 1967 – 1971
- Studio: RCA Victor Studio
- Genre: Country; Nashville Sound
- Label: RCA Victor
- Producer: Chet Atkins; Jerry Bradley; Danny Davis; Ronny Light

Hank Locklin chronology
Bless Her Heart...I Love Her (1970)	The Mayor of McLellan, Florida (1972)	Hank Locklin (1975)

Singles from The Mayor of McLellan, Florida
- 1. "Jeannie" Released: June 1969; 2. "She's as Close as I Can Get to Loving You" Released: February 1971; 3. "Only a Fool" Released: May 1971

The Mayor of McLellan, Florida is a studio album by American country music singer–songwriter Hank Locklin. It was released in November 1972 via RCA Victor Records. Consisting of ten tracks, the album was co-produced by Chet Atkins, Jerry Bradley, Danny Davis and Ronny Light. It was Locklin's final studio release for the RCA Victor label and contained among his final single releases.

== Background and content ==
Hank Locklin had his biggest chart success in the late 1950s and early 1960s with songs like "Geisha Girl," "Please Help Me, I'm Falling" and "Happy Birthday to Me." His popularity on the radio began to wane in the late 1960s. In 1969, he had his final top 40 single, yet continued releasing studio albums on RCA's label through the early 1970s. His final RCA Victor release would be The Mayor of McLellan, Florida. The album was named for Locklin's hometown, which is where the record's photographs were taken. Locklin was given the nickname "The Mayor of McLellan, Florida" from disc jockey Ralph Emery. Emery gave him the nickname due to Locklin's decision to permanently live in his hometown despite having country music success in Nashville, Tennessee.

The project contained a total of ten tracks. It included one composition penned by Locklin himself titled "I Like a Woman." It also included a cover of "Sweet Memories," which was first a hit for Andy Williams. The Mayor of McLellan, Florida was recorded in sessions held between 1967 and 1970 at the RCA Victor Studio, located in Nashville. The album was co-produced by Chet Atkins, Jerry Bradley, Danny Davis and Ronny Light.

== Release and reception ==
The Mayor of McLellan, Florida was released in November 1972 via RCA Victor Records. It became the twenty third studio release of Locklin's career in music. The album was distributed as a vinyl LP, containing five songs on either side of the record. In December 1972, Billboard announced the album's release in their "New LP/Tape Releases" section. Allmusic rated the album at 2.5 stars. The project included three previously released singles. The first single issued was the track "Jeannie," which RCA Victor released in June 1969. The song did not chart. "Only a Fool" (the third single) also did not chart following its May 1971 release. The second single released was "She's as Close as I Can Get to Loving You," which was issued in February 1971. Like the previous single, it did not chart. Spending four weeks on the Billboard Hot Country Songs chart, it peaked at number 61. The song was Locklin's final charting single in his career.

== Track listing ==
Side one
No.	Title	Writer(s)	Length
1.	"I Forgot to Live Today"	Dickey Lee; Allen Reynolds	3:09
2.	"Love the Devil Out of Me"	Lorene Allen; Jim Owen	2:11
3.	"Sweet Memories"	Mickey Newbury	3:04
4.	"Love Has a Mind of Its Own"	Dallas Frazier	2:27
5.	"Only a Fool"	Jerry Foster; Bill Price	2:06

Side two
No.	Title	Writer(s)	Length
1.	"She's as Close as I Can Get to Loving You"	Frazier; Arthur Leo "Doodle" Owens	2:37
2.	"If Loving You Means Anything"	Jerry Chesnut; Dale Ward	2:30
3.	"Wishing It Was You"	Joy Byers; Clyde Otis	2:33
4.	"I Like a Woman"	Hank Locklin	2:09
5.	"Jeannie"	Richard Davis	2:14

== Release history ==
Region	Date	Format	Label	Ref.
United States	November 1972	Vinyl	RCA Victor	
