= Bless Her Heart...I Love Her =

Studio album by Hank Locklin
- Released: August 1970
- Recorded: May – June 1970
- Studio: RCA Victor Studio
- Genre: Country; Nashville Sound
- Label: RCA Victor
- Producer: Danny Davis

Hank Locklin chronology
| Hank Locklin & Danny Davis & the Nashville Brass (1970) | Bless Her Heart...I Love Her (1970) | The Mayor of McLellan, Florida (1972) |

Singles from Bless Her Heart...I Love Her
- 1. "Bless Her Heart...I Love Her" Released: September 1970

Bless Her Heart...I Love Her is a studio album by American country music singer–songwriter Hank Locklin. It was released in August 1970 and was produced by Danny Davis. It was Locklin's twenty second studio release in his music career and contained a total of ten tracks.

The project was among Locklin's final LP's for long-time label, RCA Victor. The title track was issued as the album's only single and reached a charting position in 1970.

== Background and content ==
Hank Locklin had major success in the early 1960s with the hits "Geisha Girl," "Please Help Me, I'm Falling" and "Happy Birthday to Me." His popularity on the radio began to wane in the late 1960s. In 1969, he had his final top 40 single, yet continued releasing studio albums on RCA's label through the early 1970s.

Among his final releases for RCA was Bless Her Heart...I Love Her. The project was produced by Danny Davis, whom had produced several of Locklin's previous LP's. It was recorded between May and June 1970 at the RCA Victor Studio located in Nashville, Tennessee.

The album contained ten tracks. The title track was co-written by Locklin and Jack Smith. The project also included cover versions of two songs by Conway Twitty: "Hello Darlin'" and "It's Only Make Believe."

== Release and reception ==
Bless Her Heart...I Love Her was released in August 1970 via RCA Victor Records. It marked the twenty second studio album released in Locklin's music career.

The album was issued as a vinyl LP, containing five songs on each side of the record. The project received a favorable response from Billboard magazine who described its content to be "songs of love with a strong melodic line."

Writers also highlighted the title track, "Livin' Alone," "Morning" and "It's Only Make Believe." The record spawned its title track as the only single release. It was issued by RCA Victor in September 1970. The song spent four weeks on the Billboard Hot Country Songs chart and peaked at number 68 in October 1970.

== Track listing ==
Side one
| No. | Title | Writer(s) | Length |
|---|---|---|---|
| 1. | "Bless Her Heart...I Love Her" | Danny Davis; Hank Locklin | 2:26 |
| 2. | "All Kinds of Everything" | Derry Lindsay; Jackie Smith | 2:37 |
| 3. | "It's Raining All Over the World" | Harlan Howard | 2:27 |
| 4. | "Hello Darlin'" | Conway Twitty | 2:20 |
| 5. | "Morning" | Bill Graham | 3:00 |

Side two
| No. | Title | Writer(s) | Length |
|---|---|---|---|
| 1. | "It's Only Make Believe" | Jack Nance; Twitty | 2:08 |
| 2. | "The One Girl for Me" | Jim Morehead; George Nowlan | 2:47 |
| 3. | "If Not for You" | Jerry Chesnut | 3:09 |
| 4. | "Don't You Ever Get Tired of Hurting Me" | Hank Cochran | 3:15 |
| 5. | "Livin' Alone" | Wayne Walker | 2:40 |

== Personnel ==
All credits are adapted from the liner notes of Bless Her Heart...I Love Her.

Musical and technical personnel

- Chet Atkins – Producer (track 10)
- Jesse Burt – Liner Notes
- Danny Davis – Producer
- Danny Davis and the Nashville Brass – Ensemble
- The Jordanaires – Background vocals
- Hank Locklin – Lead vocals
- Al Pachucki – Engineer
- Tom Pick – Engineer

== Release history ==
| Region | Date | Format | Label | Ref. |
|---|---|---|---|---|
| United Kingdom | August 1970 | Vinyl | RCA Victor | |
| United States | August 1970 | Vinyl | RCA Victor | |
