= All Kinds of Everything (album) =

Studio album (re-recording) by Hank Locklin
- Released: 1979
- Studio: Fireside Studios
- Genre: Country
- Label: Top Spin
- Producer: Porter Wagoner

Hank Locklin chronology
| Country Hall of Fame (1978) | All Kinds of Everything (1979) | Generations in Song (2001) |

Singles from All Kinds of Everything
- 1. "The Upper Room" Released: 1978

All Kinds of Everything is a studio album by American country singer–songwriter Hank Locklin. It was released in 1979 via Top Spin Records and contained 12 tracks of new material. It contained mostly re-recordings of songs Locklin had previously recorded. The album was issued to international markets outside of his home market: the United States.

== Background, content and release ==
Hank Locklin had major hits in the 1950s and 1960s with songs like "Send Me the Pillow You Dream On" and "Please Help Me, I'm Falling." These songs (among others) gained notable international success, especially in Europe. After Locklin's commercial success declined in the 1970s, he began touring more overseas. He remained a popular concert attraction in Ireland specifically.

All Kinds of Everything was Locklin's second studio recording tailored specifically for the Irish market. In 1978, he had released his first international album. The project was recorded at Fireside Studios in Nashville, Tennessee and was produced by country artist Porter Wagoner. The record contained 12 tracks of material. It included a remake of Locklin's self-penned tune, "The Upper Room". The album's remaining songs were also re-recordings of titles Locklin had previously cut for RCA Victor Recordings during his career with them. This included "Day of Autumn Gold" as well as "Time and Eternity."

All Kinds of Everything was released in 1979 on Top Spin Records, an Irish record label which had issued his previous album. The project was issued as a vinyl LP, containing six songs on each side of the record. In later decades, the album would be re-issued for digital and streaming sites. The album included one single release. Locklin's re-recording of "The Upper Room" was first released as a single on the Top Spin label in 1978.

== Track listing ==
=== Vinyl version ===
Side one
| No. | Title | Writer(s) | Length |
|---|---|---|---|
| 1. | "Love with Feeling" | Porter Wagoner | 3:36 |
| 2. | "Please Mama Stay Home with Me" | Eddy Arnold; Wally Fowler; Graydon Hall | 3:34 |
| 3. | "Eventually" | Hank Locklin | 3:07 |
| 4. | "I Gotta Take a Week Off (From the World)" | Locklin | 2:56 |
| 5. | "Day of Autumn Gold" | S. Carroll; M. Carroll | 2:14 |
| 6. | "The Upper Room" | Locklin | 4:22 |

Side two
| No. | Title | Writer(s) | Length |
|---|---|---|---|
| 1. | "All Kinds of Everything" | D. Lindsey; J. Smith | 2:16 |
| 2. | "Send Me Your Coffee Cup" | Locklin | 3:00 |
| 3. | "Jealous Heart" | Jenny Lou Carson | 3:25 |
| 4. | "The Best Woman" | Locklin; Ben Peters | 3:16 |
| 5. | "Wedding Bells" | Claude Boone | 4:01 |
| 6. | "Time and Eternity" | Jack Cardwell | 3:19 |

=== Digital version ===
All Kinds of Everything
| No. | Title | Writer(s) | Length |
|---|---|---|---|
| 1. | "Love with Feeling" | Wagoner | 3:37 |
| 2. | "Please Mama Stay Home with Me" | Arnold; Fowler; Hall | 3:35 |
| 3. | "Eventually" | Locklin | 3:08 |
| 4. | "I Gotta Take a Week Off (From the World)" | Locklin | 2:57 |
| 5. | "Day of Autumn Gold" | S. Carroll; M. Carroll | 2:15 |
| 6. | "The Upper Room" | Locklin | 4:24 |
| 7. | "All Kinds of Everything" | Lindsey; Smith | 2:16 |
| 8. | "Send Me Your Coffee Cup" | Locklin | 3:01 |
| 9. | "Jealous Heart" | Carson | 3:25 |
| 10. | "The Best Woman" | Locklin; Peters | 3:17 |
| 11. | "Wedding Bells" | Boone | 4:03 |
| 12. | "Time and Eternity" | Cardwell | 3:19 |

== Personnel ==
All credits are adapted from the liner notes of All Kinds of Everything.

Musical personnel

- Joe Chrisman – Drums
- Ronald Drake – Background vocals
- Bobby Dyson – Guitar
- Beckie Foster – Background vocals
- Allen Henson – Background vocals
- Dave Kirby – Guitar
- Hank Locklin – Lead vocals
- Laverna Moore – Background vocals
- Weldon Myrick – Steel guitar
- Fred Newell – Guitar
- Hargus "Pig" Robbins – Piano

Technical personnel

- Tom Pick – Engineer
- Roy Shockley – Engineer
- Porter Wagoner – Producer

== Release history ==
| Region | Date | Format | Label | Ref. |
|---|---|---|---|---|
| Ireland | 1979 | Vinyl | Top Spin Records | |
| United States | 2010s | Digital download; streaming | IML (Irish Music Licensing) | |
