= Country Hall of Fame =

Country Hall of Fame may refer to:

- Country Hall of Fame (1968 album), an album by Hank Locklin
- Country Hall of Fame (1978 album), an album by Hank Locklin

== See also ==
- Country Music Hall of Fame
