= Hank Locklin Sings Eddy Arnold =

Studio album by Hank Locklin
- Released: June 1965
- Recorded: February 1965
- Studio: RCA Victor Studio
- Genre: Country; Nashville Sound
- Label: RCA Victor
- Producer: Chet Atkins

Hank Locklin chronology
Hank Locklin Sings Hank Williams (1964)	Hank Locklin Sings Eddy Arnold (1965)	My Kind of Country Music (1965)

Hank Locklin Sings Eddy Arnold is a studio album by American country singer–songwriter Hank Locklin. It was released in June 1965 via RCA Victor Records and was produced by Chet Atkins. The project was Locklin's tenth studio album and one of several concept albums he made during his career. The album was a collection of cover songs first recorded by Locklin's musical inspiration, Eddy Arnold. It included some of his biggest hits and most well-known songs. The collection received mixed reviews from critics and publications.

== Background and content ==
Hank Locklin was among country music's first vocalists to release a concept album (albums that centered around a particular theme). His first studio album, Foreign Love, was a concept project and was issued in 1958. Among the concept records he recorded were tribute albums to those that Locklin admired and drew inspiration from. This included 1962's tribute LP to Roy Acuff, among others. Hank Locklin Sings Eddy Arnold would be his third tribute album to a fellow performer. Locklin had long admired the work of Eddy Arnold and watched his career rise in the 1940s and 1950s. Both performers were also signed to the RCA Victor label and were both produced by Chet Atkins.

The album was recorded in February 1965 at the RCA Victor Studio, located in Nashville, Tennessee. The sessions were produced by Chet Atkins, who had been Locklin's longtime RCA producer. The session work featured The Nashville A-Team of musicians, including Floyd Cramer on piano and Grady Martin on guitar. The record consisted of twelve tracks. All of its tracks were previously recorded and made successful by Arnold. It featured his early hits like "Bouquet of Roses" and "I'll Hold You in My Heart (Till I Can Hold You in My Arms)." It also featured later hits such as "I Really Don't Want to Know."

== Release and reception ==
Professional ratings
Review scores
Source	Rating
Allmusic	2.5/5 stars
Billboard	Favorable

Hank Locklin Sings Eddy Arnold was released in June 1965 via RCA Victor Records. It was Locklin's tenth official studio album in his recording career. The project was distributed as a vinyl LP, featuring six songs on either side of the record. No known singles were spawned from the album, unlike many of Locklin's studio releases. Upon its release, the album received a positive response from Billboard, who reviewed it in their July 1965 issue. Reviewers described Locklin as "a fine country singer" and praised his unique vocal styling: "Locklin does not imitate the Arnold style, for he has his own distinction as an artist." In later years, the LP received a rating from Allmusic, which gave it a less favorable response: 2.5 out of 5 stars.

== Track listing ==
Side one
No.	Title	Writer(s)	Length
1.	"Bouquet of Roses"	Bob Hilliard; Steve Nelson	2:41
2.	"A Heart Full of Love (For a Handful of Kisses)"	Eddy Arnold; Nelson; Ray Soehnel	2:16
3.	"I Really Don't Want to Know"	Howard Barnes; Don Robertson	2:30
4.	"Anytime"	Herbert "Happy" Lawson	2:48
5.	"That's How Much I Love You"	Arnold; Wally Fowler; Graydon Hall	2:12
6.	"Mommy, Please Stay Home with Me"	Arnold; Fowler; Hall	3:56

Side two
No.	Title	Writer(s)	Length
1.	"Chained to a Memory"	Jenny Lou Carson	2:41
2.	"I'll Hold You in My Heart (Till I Can Hold You in My Arms)"	Arnold; Howard Horton; Vic McAlpin	2:15
3.	"Just a Little Lovin' (Will Go a Long Way)"	Arnold; Zeke Clements	2:18
4.	"I Walk Alone"	Herbert Wilson	3:00
5.	"Each Minute Seems a Million Years"	Alton Watson	2:57
6.	"It's a Sin"	Fred Rose; Zeb Turner	2:54

== Personnel ==
All credits are adapted from the liner notes of Hank Locklin Sings Eddy Arnold.

Musical personnel

- Kenneth Buttrey – drums
- Floyd Cramer – piano
- Pete Drake – steel guitar
- Ray Edenton – guitar
- Buddy Harman – drums
- Roy Huskey – bass
- The Jordanaires – background vocals
- Jerry Kennedy – guitar
- The Anita Kerr Singers – background vocals
- Hank Locklin – lead vocals
- Grady Martin – guitar
- Bob Moore – bass
- Henry Strzelecki – bass

Technical personnel

- Chet Atkins – producer
- William Vandevort – engineer

== Release history ==
Region	Date	Format	Label	Ref.
Canada	June 1965	Vinyl	RCA Victor	
United States	June 1965	Vinyl	RCA Victor	
