= Hank Locklin Sings Hank Williams =

Studio album by Hank Locklin
- Released: September 1964
- Recorded: July 1964
- Studio: RCA Victor Studio
- Genres: Country; Nashville Sound
- Label: RCA Victor
- Producers: Chet Atkins; Bob Ferguson

Hank Locklin chronology
Irish Songs, Country Style (1964)	Hank Locklin Sings Hank Williams (1964)	Hank Locklin Sings Eddy Arnold (1965)

Hank Locklin Sings Hank Williams is a studio album by American country singer–songwriter Hank Locklin. It was released in September 1964 via RCA Victor Records. The record was co-produced by Chet Atkins and Bob Ferguson. The project was a tribute effort to Locklin's friend and fellow country artist Hank Williams. It was recorded in an orchestral style that embodied Locklin's new Nashville Sound musical identity. It received mixed reviews from writers and critics.

== Background and content ==
Hank Locklin recorded among country music's first concept albums (albums centered around a particular theme), beginning with Foreign Love in 1958. He followed with several more studio releases that focused on concepts, including a handful of tribute LP's to artists Locklin considered inspirations to his own career. This began with 1962's tribute album to Roy Acuff. As the 1960s progressed, Locklin's musical production featured more orchestral arrangements. This orchestral sound was also embedded into Hank Locklin Sings Hank Williams.

The project featured The Nashville A-Team session musicians, which included a handful of string instruments. The album was recorded in July 1964 at the RCA Victor Studio in Nashville, Tennessee. It was produced by Chet Atkins, who produced Locklin's previous studio releases for RCA. Bob Ferguson is also given co-production credit. Hank Locklin Sings Hank Williams consisted of twelve tracks, all of which had been first recorded by Hank Williams. Locklin chose to record the album as a tribute to Williams, who was a friend of his. In his earliest years of performing, Locklin sang alongside Williams in small clubs and dance halls often singing the songs featured on the album. Songs Locklin recorded for the project included "I'm So Lonesome I Could Cry," "Your Cheatin' Heart" and "Hey, Good Lookin'."

== Release and reception ==
Professional ratings
Review scores
Source	Rating
Allmusic	2.5/5 stars
Billboard	Favorable

Hank Locklin Sings Hank Williams was released in September 1964 on RCA Victor Records. It was Locklin's ninth studio record in his music career. The album was distributed as a vinyl LP and contained six songs on either side of the record. In later years, the album would be issued in digital formats as a music download and for streaming services. No known singles were spawned from the album, unlike many of Locklin's studio releases. The album would receive a nomination from the Grammy Awards in 1964 for Best Country and Western Vocal Performance.

Following its release, Hank Locklin Sings Hank Williams was reviewed by Billboard magazine in December 1964. Critics gave the album a warm response, calling it "a winner for dealers and stations." Meanwhile, Greg Adams of Allmusic only gave the album 2.5 out of 5 stars. Although he considered to be a "respectable update" of Williams' catalog, he also found the record to be a "countrypolitan affair" (in reference to the album's string instrumentation). Adams commented that Locklin's is not that of a crooner like Eddy Arnold and Jim Reeves and therefore, pop instrumentation should be avoided.

== Track listing ==
All songs are composed by Hank Williams, except where noted.

=== Vinyl version ===
Side one
No.	Title	Length
1.	"Cold, Cold Heart"	2:41
2.	"Why Don't You Love Me"	1:57
3.	"May You Never Be Alone"	2:53
4.	"Jambalaya (On the Bayou)"	1:49
5.	"Hey, Good Lookin'"	2:15
6.	"Your Cheatin' Heart"	2:37

Side two
No.	Title	Writer(s)	Length
1.	"Mansion on the Hill"	Fred Rose; Williams	3:20
2.	"There'll Be No Teardrops Tonight"		2:43
3.	"I Can't Help It (If I'm Still in Love with You)"		2:35
4.	"You Win Again"		3:06
5.	"Long Gone Lonesome Blues"		2:20
6.	"I'm So Lonesome I Could Cry"		2:08

=== Digital version ===
Hank Locklin Sings Hank Williams
No.	Title	Writer(s)	Length
1.	"Cold, Cold Heart"		2:35
2.	"Why Don't You Love Me"		1:52
3.	"May You Never Be Alone"		2:49
4.	"Jambalaya (On the Bayou)"		1:45
5.	"Hey, Good Lookin'"		2:11
6.	"Your Cheatin' Heart"		2:30
7.	"Mansion on the Hill"	Rose; Williams	3:17
8.	"There'll Be No Teardrops Tonight"		2:40
9.	"I Can't Help It (If I'm Still in Love with You)"		2:29
10.	"You Win Again"		3:01
11.	"Long Gone Lonesome Blues"		2:17
12.	"I'm Lonesome I Could Cry"		2:05

== Personnel ==
All credits are adapted from the liner notes of Hank Locklin Sings Hank Williams.

Musical personnel

- Brenton Banks – strings
- George Binkley – strings
- Cecil Brower – strings
- Kenneth Buttrey – drums
- Pete Drake – steel guitar
- Ray Edenton – rhythm guitar
- Lillian Hunt – strings
- The Jordanaires – background vocals
- The Anita Kerr Singers – background vocals
- Hank Locklin – lead vocals
- Grady Martin – guitar
- Wayne Moss – guitar
- Hargus "Pig" Robbins – piano
- Booker Rowe – strings

Technical personnel

- Chet Atkins – producer
- Bob Ferguson – liner notes, producer
- Bill Vandevort – engineer

== Release history ==
Region	Date	Format	Label	Ref.
Canada	September 1964	Vinyl	RCA Victor	
Germany	September 1964	Vinyl	RCA Victor	
United States	September 1964	Vinyl	RCA Victor	
United States	2010s	Music download; streaming	Sony Music Entertainment	
