= Followed Closely by My Teardrops =

Single by Hank Locklin
- B-side: "You Never Want to Love Me"
- Released: February 1964
- Recorded: March 15, 1963
- Studio: RCA Victor Studio
- Genre: Country
- Length: 2:10
- Label: RCA Victor
- Songwriter(s): Paul Evans; Fred Tobias
- Producer(s): Chet Atkins

Hank Locklin singles chronology
"Wooden Soldier" (1963)	"Followed Closely by My Teardrops" (1964)	"I Was Coming Home to You" (1964)

"Followed Closely by My Teardrops" is a song written by Paul Davis and Fred Tobias. It was originally recorded by American country singer–songwriter Hank Locklin. In 1964, it was released as a single and became a major hit on the American country chart that year.

== Background, release and chart performance ==
In 1960, Hank Locklin had the biggest hit single of his career with the song "Please Help Me, I'm Falling." The song became his second to top the country charts and also crossed over into the pop market, becoming a top ten hit there. Its success elevated Locklin's career and he had further fits after the single. These further hits included "One Step Ahead of My Past," "We're Gonna Go Fishin'" and "Followed Closely by My Teardrops." The track was composed by Paul Evans and Fred Tobias. The song was recorded on March 15, 1963 at the RCA Victor Studio, located in Nashville, Tennessee. It was produced by Chet Atkins.

"Happy Journey" was released as a single in February 1964 on RCA Victor Records. The single was released as a seven-inch RPM record, containing "You Never Want to Love Me" on its B-side. The song spent a total of 17 weeks on the Billboard Hot Country and Western Sides chart, peaking at number 15 in May 1964. The song was not issued on a studio album of Locklin's upon its initial release. It was first issued on his 1970 compilation, Candy Kisses.

== Track listing ==
7 inch vinyl single

- "Followed Closely by My Teardrops" – 2:10
- "You Never Want to Love Me" – 2:24

== Chart performance ==
Chart (1964)	Peak position
US Hot Country Songs (Billboard)	15
