= By the Grace of God: The Gospel Album =

Studio album by Hank Locklin
- Released: September 26, 2006
- Studio: 16 Ton; Merit
- Genre: Gospel
- Length: 58:33
- Label: Yell

Hank Locklin chronology
Generations in Song (2001)	By the Grace of God: The Gospel Album (2006)

By the Grace of God: The Gospel Album is a studio album by American country singer–songwriter Hank Locklin. It was released on September 26, 2006, via Yell Records and contained 22 tracks. It was the twenty ninth studio project of Locklin's career and his final album release before his death in 2009. By the Grace of God was a collection of gospel recordings containing a variety of solo and duet tracks with various artists. The album received positive reviews from critics following its release.

== Background ==
Hank Locklin had commercial success as a country artist during the 1950s and 60s with songs like "Send Me the Pillow You Dream On," "It's a Little More Like Heaven" and the crossover pop hit "Please Help Me, I'm Falling." After his commercial momentum waned during the early 1970s, Locklin entered a recording hiatus following the 1970s. A blood cell disease impacted his physical health in later years but with the support his son, Locklin released his first studio record in over two decades titled Generations in Song (2001). At the time of the 2001 release, Locklin had announced plans to record a gospel album but had not yet put the plan into effect.

== Content and recording ==
Locklin recorded the tracks for By the Grace of God at the 16 Ton and Merit recording studios, both located in Nashville, Tennessee. According to Larry Stephens of Country Standard Time, the album was a reflection of Locklin's "personal journey as a Christian". The album featured 22 gospel recordings in total. The remaining five songs on the collection were considered bonus tracks and all were cover versions of traditional gospel hymns. Most of the album's material was composed by Locklin himself and had originally been penned over the course of a 20-year period. In addition, Locklin also covered the traditional gospel tunes "Amazing Grace" and "When the Saints Go Marching In". He is joined by collaborators The Oak Ridge Boys, The Jordanaires, Jeff & Sheri Easter, Gold City and his son, Hank Adam Locklin. His son also contributed towards arranging several of the album's tracks.

== Release and critical reception ==
By the Grace of God: The Gospel Album was originally released on September 26, 2006, on Yell Records. The album was originally distributed as a compact disc with all 22 tracks on one disc. In later years, the project was re-released to digital markets including Apple Music. By the Grace of God would ultimately be Locklin's final studio project released in music career before his death in 2009. The album received a mostly favorable response from Larry Stephens of Country Standard Time following its release. Stephens praised Locklin's voice: "It's amazing that a singer at 88 can be in such good voice." Yet, Stephens did note that the album's material felt "a little uneven at times". He concluded by stating, "This is an CD every fan of Hank Locklin should have and the only complaint you're likely to voice is the skimpy insert."

== Track listing ==
All songs are composed by Hank Locklin, except where noted.

By the Grace of God: The Gospel Album
No.	Title	Writer(s)	Length
1.	"Gloryland Way"	J.S. Torbelt	1:52
2.	"Right Out of a Clear Blue Sky"		3:26
3.	"The Bottle (For the Cross)"		2:34
4.	"A Whole Lot of Love (To Come Home To)" (featuring The Oak Ridge Boys)		2:46
5.	"When the Saints Go Marching In" (with Hank Adam Locklin)	Traditional	2:54
6.	"Amazing Grace"	Traditional	1:38
7.	"My Valley"		2:22
8.	"Turn On to Jesus" (featuring Gold City)		2:55
9.	"My Soul Is Strong" (with Hank Adam Locklin)	Ray "Chip" Davis; Hank Locklin	2:31
10.	"Sweet Loving Word"		3:19
11.	"Today Has Already Come to Pass" (featuring Jeff & Sheri Easter)		2:31
12.	"My Savior's Arms" (with Hank Adam Locklin)	Hank Adam Locklin	3:06
13.	"Church Behind the Wall" (with Hank Adam Locklin)		3:26
14.	"Wisdom and Knowledge"		2:47
15.	"I Praise the Lord"		2:35
16.	"From Thorns to Feathers"		2:59
17.	"Are the Seeds Still in the Barn"		3:02

Bonus tracks
No.	Title	Writer(s)	Length
18.	"Have a Little Talk with Jesus"	Cleavant Derricks	2:21
19.	"Just a Closer Walk with Thee"	Traditional	2:57
20.	"Nothing but the Blood of Jesus"	Traditional	1:21
21.	"Lead Me Gently Home"	Traditional	2:50
22.	"Milky White Way"	Lander Coleman	2:22

== Personnel ==
All credits are adapted from the liner notes of By the Grace of God: The Gospel Album and AllMusic.

Musical personnel

- Jimmy Capps – Bass guitar, rhythm guitar, hi string guitar, tic tac bass
- Gene Chrisman – Drums, percussion
- Jeff & Sheri Easter – Guest artist
- Herbert "Hoot" Hester – Fiddle, mandolin, rhythm guitar
- John Hughey – Steel guitar
- The Jordanaires – Guest artist
- Billy Linneman – Upright bass
- Hank Locklin – Lead vocals
- Hank Adam Locklin – Guest artist
- The Oak Ridge Boys – Guest artist
- Boots Randolph – Saxophone
- Hargus "Pig" Robbins – Organ, piano
- Johnny Rose – Dobro, mandolin, rhythm guitar
- Joe Rucker – Mandolin, rhythm guitar
- Pete Wade – Electric guitar, rhythm guitar

Technical personnel

- Hank Adam Locklin – Arrangement
- Linda Nail – Engineer
- Tom Pick – Engineer, mixing
- Danny White – Engineer

== Release history ==
Region	Date	Format	Label	Ref.
United States	September 26, 2006	Compact disc	Yell Records	
United States	2010s	Music download; streaming	Yell Records	
