= Nashville Women =

Studio album by Hank Locklin
- Released: August 1967
- Recorded: 1967–67
- Studio: RCA Victor Studio
- Genre: Country; Nashville Sound
- Label: RCA Victor
- Producer: Chet Atkins

Hank Locklin chronology
Send Me the Pillow You Dream On and Other Great Country Hits (1967)	Nashville Women (1967)	Country Hall of Fame (1968)

Singles from Nashville Women
- 1. "The Best Part of Loving You" Released: September 1966; 2. "Hasta Luego (See You Later)" Released: January 1967; 3. "Nashville Women" Released: May 1967

Nashville Women is a studio album by American country singer–songwriter Hank Locklin. It was released in August 1967 via RCA Victor Records and was produced by Chet Atkins. Nashville Women was Locklin's sixteenth studio recording and contained 12 tracks. Three of the album's tracks were singles that became minor hits on the country chart in 1967. The album itself would also chart following its release. Nashville Women would receive positive reviews from critics and music publications.

== Background and content ==
Although Hank Locklin had his biggest hits several years prior ("Send Me the Pillow You Dream On" and "Please Help Me, I'm Falling"), he continued having charting country singles through the remainder of the 1960s. Songs such as "Insurance" and "The Girls Get Prettier" helped facilitate the release of further Locklin studio albums, including Nashville Women. The studio project was recorded in sessions between 1964 and 1967 at the RCA Victor Studio, located in Nashville, Tennessee. The sessions were produced by Chet Atkins, Locklin's longtime producer at RCA.

Nashville Women contained a total of 12 tracks. Locklin composed the track, "This Memory," which was included towards the end of the record. Other writers who contributed to the record included Liz Anderson, Harlan Howard and Marijohn Wilkin. Howard had composed the album's title track. The album also featured a cover of "Release Me (And Let Me Love You Again)," which had originally been covered by various country and pop artists. Also included is a cover of Carl and Pearl Butler's number one country hit, "Don't Let Me Cross Over."

== Release and reception ==
Professional ratings
Review scores
Source	Rating
Allmusic	4/5 stars
Billboard	Favorable

Nashville Women was released in August 1967 on RCA Victor Records. It would be Locklin's sixteenth studio recording released in his career. It was also his second studio album released in 1967. The album was distributed originally as a vinyl LP, containing six songs on each side of the record. Nashville Women became Locklin's second album to chart on the Billboard Top Country Albums list. It spent a total of two weeks on the chart and peaked at number 36 in October 1967. The record received a positive response from music publications and critics following its release. Billboard magazine positively commented that the album would be sure to please fans of Hank Locklin and that record stores would see high sales. Thom Owens of Allmusic would also review the album in later years, giving it four out of five stars. "Although it has a couple of slow spots, Nashville Women is a highly enjoyable LP, boasting a number of engaging country-pop songs," he wrote.

Nashville Women included three songs that were released as singles. The first single release was "The Best Part of Loving You," which was originally released in September 1966. The song would peak at number 69 on the Billboard Hot Country Singles chart in October 1966. "Hasta Luego (See You Later)" was released as the second single in January 1967. Spending ten weeks on the Billboard country songs chart, it would peak at number 41. The final single released off the album was its title track. It was issued in May 1967. Spending only four weeks on the Billboard country singles chart, it would peak at number 73 in July 1967.

== Track listings ==
=== Vinyl version ===
Side one
No.	Title	Writer(s)	Length
1.	"Nashville Women"	Harlan Howard	2:29
2.	"After the Hurt Is Gone"	Marijohn Wilkin	2:35
3.	"Behind My Back"	Liz Anderson	2:25
4.	"Hasta Luego (See You Later)"	Johnny Hicks	2:21
5.	"Burning Inside"	Anderson	2:25
6.	"The Best Part of Loving You"	Ann Prince	2:18

Side two
No.	Title	Writer(s)	Length
1.	"Hurt Me Again"	Jerry Foster; Bill Rice	2:10
2.	"Release Me"	Eddie Miller; James Pebworth; Robert Yount	2:20
3.	"I Don't Apologize for Loving You"	Velma Burns	2:34
4.	"This Memory"	Hank Locklin	2:27
5.	"Don't Let Me Cross Over"	Penny Jay	2:37
6.	"I Feel a Cry Coming On"	Prince	2:42

=== Digital version ===
Nashville Women
No.	Title	Writer(s)	Length
1.	"Nashville Women"	Howard	2:36
2.	"After the Hurt Is Gone"	Wilkin	2:40
3.	"Behind My Back"	Anderson	2:30
4.	"Hasta Luego (See You Later)"	Hicks	2:25
5.	"Burning Inside"	Anderson	2:32
6.	"The Best Part of Loving You"	Prince	2:25
7.	"Hurt Me Again"	Foster; Rice	2:14
8.	"Release Me"	Miller; Pebworth; Yount	2:25
9.	"I Don't Apologize for Loving You"	Burns	2:38
10.	"This Memory"	Locklin	2:33
11.	"Don't Let Me Cross Over"	Jay	2:45
12.	"I Feel a Cry Coming On"	Prince	2:43

== Personnel ==
All credits are adapted from the liner notes of Nashville Women.

Musical and technical personnel

- Chet Atkins – producer
- The Jordanaires – background vocals
- Hank Locklin – lead vocals
- Jim Malloy – recording engineer
- Chuck Seitz – recording engineer
- Bill Vandevort – recording engineer

== Chart performance ==
Chart (1967)	Peak position
US Top Country Albums (Billboard)	36

== Release history ==
Region	Date	Format	Label	Ref.
United States	August 1967	Vinyl	RCA Victor	
United States	2010s	Digital; Streaming	Sony Music Entertainment	
