= Country Hall of Fame (1978 album) =

Studio album (re-recording) by Hank Locklin
- Released: 1978
- Studio: Big Tom's Studios
- Genre: Country
- Label: Top Spin
- Producer: Basil Hendricks

Hank Locklin chronology
There Never Was a Time (1977)	Country Hall of Fame (1978)	All Kinds of Everything (1979)

Country Hall of Fame is a studio album by American country music singer–songwriter Hank Locklin. It was released in 1978 via Top Spin Records and contained a total of 12 tracks. The album featured new songs and re-recordings of material previously cut by Locklin.

== Background, content and release ==
Hank Locklin had his biggest commercial success in the 1950s and 1960s with songs like "Send Me the Pillow You Dream On" and "Please Help Me, I'm Falling." These songs (among others) gained notable popularity overseas, particularly in Europe and Japan. After Locklin's commercial success declined in the 1970s, he began touring more internationally. He remained a popular concert attraction in Ireland specifically.

Country Hall of Fame was recorded during this period and was tailored specifically for the Irish music market. It was recorded at Big Tom's Studios, located in Castleblayney, Ireland. The sessions were produced by Basil Hendricks. The project contained 12 tracks. Most of the album's material were re-recordings of songs previously made successful by Locklin. Covers included "Please Help Me, I'm Falling," "Irish Eyes" and "The Country Hall of Fame." New material included "Country Girl Star" and "Green, White and Gold."

Country Hall of Fame was released in 1978 via Top Spin Records. It was the twenty sixth studio album release of Locklin's music career and his first with the Top Spin label. The project was originally issued as a vinyl LP, containing six songs on either side. In later years, it was released for other markets in a digital and streaming format.

== Track listings ==
=== Vinyl version ===
Side one
No.	Title	Writer(s)	Length
1.	"Country Girl Star"	Becki Bluefield
2.	"Please Help Me, I'm Falling"	Hal Blair; Don Robertson
3.	"Country Hall of Fame"	Karl Davis
4.	"Green, White and Gold"	Hank Locklin
5.	"The Wild Side of Life"	Arlie Carter; William Warren
6.	"These Arms You Push Away"	Bluefield

Side two
No.	Title	Writer(s)	Length
1.	"Irish Eyes"	George Carroll; Locklin
2.	"Last Look at Mother"	Locklin
3.	"I Can't Stop Loving You"	Don Gibson
4.	"Send Me the Pillow"	Locklin
5.	"Before the Next Teardrop Falls"	Vivian Keith; Ben Peters
6.	"Please Release Me"	Eddie Miller; James Pebworth; Robert Yount

=== Digital version ===
Country Hall of Fame
No.	Title	Writer(s)	Length
1.	"Country Girl Star"	Bluefield	2:54
2.	"Please Help Me, I'm Falling"	Blair; Robertson	2:23
3.	"Country Hall of Fame"	Davis	3:29
4.	"Green, White and Gold"	Locklin	2:42
5.	"The Wild Side of Life"	Carter; Warren	2:43
6.	"These Arms You Push Away"	Bluefield	3:08
7.	"Irish Eyes"	Carroll; Locklin	2:50
8.	"Last Look at Mother"	Locklin	2:53
9.	"I Can't Stop Loving You"	Gibson	3:50
10.	"Send Me the Pillow"	Locklin	2:22
11.	"Before the Next Teardrop Falls"	Keith; Peters	2:33
12.	"Please Release Me"	Miller; Pebworth; Yount	2:37

== Release history ==
Region	Date	Format	Label	Ref.
Ireland	1978	Vinyl	Top Spin Records	
United States	2010s	Digital download; streaming	IML (Irish Music Licensing)	
