= A Tribute to Roy Acuff: The King of Country Music =

Studio album by Hank Locklin
- Released: February 1962
- Studio: RCA Studio
- Genre: Country; Nashville Sound
- Label: RCA Victor
- Producer: Chet Atkins; Anita Kerr

Hank Locklin chronology
Happy Journey (1962)	A Tribute to Roy Acuff: The King of Country Music (1962)	Hank Locklin (1962)

Singles from A Tribute to Roy Acuff: The King of Country Music
- 1. "Wabash Cannonball" Released: November 1962

A Tribute to Roy Acuff: The King of Country Music is a studio album by American country artist Hank Locklin. It was released in February 1962 via RCA Victor Records. It was co-was produced by Chet Atkins and Anita Kerr. The project was a tribute record to fellow country artist and Grand Ole Opry member Roy Acuff. It featured a collection of 12 songs recorded famously by Acuff up to that point in his own career. The album received positive reviews and reception from critics following its release.

== Background and content ==
In the early 1960s, Hank Locklin became a more established country music artist. He had a series of major country hits, which included "Send Me the Pillow (That You Dream On)," "Geisha Girl" and "Please Help Me, I'm Falling." The latter tune was a number one hit and crossed over into the pop charts. His new success allowed him to record more studio albums. Among the albums Locklin chose to record during this era was a tribute collection to country performer, Roy Acuff. Locklin was largely influenced by Acuff's music and was his first tribute project to be released with the RCA label. A Tribute to Roy Acuff was recorded at the RCA Studio in Nashville, Tennessee. The sessions for the album were produced by Chet Atkins, who also produced Locklin's previous three studio projects. Anita Kerr also co-produced the project.

A total of 12 songs were included on the album that were notable recordings by Acuff. Two of the tracks were composed by Acuff himself: "Precious Jewel" and "As Long as I Live." Other songs were composed by others and were recorded by others before Acuff chose to perform them. This includes "Wabash Cannonball" and "Blue Eyes Crying in the Rain." Acuff's original recordings featured a simpler, traditional country musical style. Meanwhile, Locklin's renditions included more instrumentation, such as background vocals from the Anita Kerr Singers and more guitar presence.

== Release and reception ==
Professional ratings
Review scores
Source	Rating
Allmusic	3/5 stars
Billboard	Favorable

A Tribute to Roy Acuff was released in February 1962 on RCA Victor Records. The project was Locklin's fourth studio album in his career. The album was distributed as a vinyl LP, featuring six songs on either side of the record. Following its release, Locklin's cover of "Wabash Cannonball" was spawned as the album's single. The single was issued in November 1962, but failed to chart. A Tribute to Roy Acuff received positive reviews following its release. Billboard magazine gave it a favorable response in their October 1962 publication. Critics praised Locklin as a singer, calling him "one of today's top country singers." They also noted that Locklin interpreted the songs in his own style rather than mimic Acuff's original vocal performances. "A fine tribute to Acuff," they concluded. The album also received three out of five stars from Allmusic.

== Track listing ==
Side one
No.	Title	Writer(s)	Length
1.	"Waltz of the Wind"	Fred Rose	2:35
2.	"As Long as I Live"	Roy Acuff	2:25
3.	"Wabash Cannonball"	A.P. Carter	2:46
4.	"All the World Is Lonely Now"	Mel Foree	2:19
5.	"The Wreck on the Highway"	Dorsey Dixon	2:03
6.	"Pins and Needles (In My Heart)"	Floyd Jenkins	2:25

Side two
No.	Title	Writer(s)	Length
1.	"The Great Speckled Bird"	Carter; Guy Smith; Swain	2:39
2.	"Maple on the Hill"	Addison Cole	2:58
3.	"We Live in Two Different Worlds"	Rose	2:09
4.	"A Precious Jewel"	Acuff	2:26
5.	"Blue Eyes Crying in the Rain"	Rose	2:35
6.	"Once More"	Dusty Owens	2:23

== Personnel ==
All credits are adapted from the liner notes of A Tribute to Roy Acuff: The King of Country Music.

Musical personnel

- Buddy Harman – drums
- The Jordanaires – background vocals
- Anita Kerr – accordion
- The Anita Kerr Singers – background vocals
- Hank Locklin – lead vocals
- Grady Martin – guitar
- Bob Moore – bass
- Hargus "Pig" Robbins – piano
- Velma Smith – guitar
- Gordon Stoker – accordion

Technical personnel

- Chet Atkins – producer
- Archie Campbell – liner notes
- Anita Kerr – producer
- Bill Porter – engineer

== Release history ==
Region	Date	Format	Label	Ref.
Canada	February 1962	Vinyl	RCA Victor	
Germany	February 1962	Vinyl	RCA Victor	
United States	February 1962	Vinyl	RCA Victor	
