= The Girls Get Prettier =

Studio album by Hank Locklin
- Released: May 1966
- Recorded: January 1966
- Studio: RCA Victor, Nashville, Tennessee
- Genre: Country; Nashville Sound
- Label: RCA Victor
- Producer: Chet Atkins

Hank Locklin chronology
Once Over Lightly (1965)	The Girls Get Prettier (1966)	The Gloryland Way (1966)

Singles from The Girls Get Prettier
- 1. "The Girls Get Prettier (Every Day)" Released: October 1965; 2. "There's More Pretty Girls Than One" Released: July 1966

The Girls Get Prettier is a studio album by American country singer–songwriter Hank Locklin. It was released in May 1966 via RCA Victor Records and was produced by Chet Atkins. It was Locklin's thirteenth studio recording in his music career and contained two singles, one of which became a top forty hit in 1966. The album consisted of 12 tracks and received mixed reviews from music publications.

== Background and content ==
Hank Locklin had his biggest career hits during the 1960s, beginning with "Please Help Me, I'm Falling" in 1960. He continued having several more hits with "We're Gonna Go Fishin'," "Flyin' South" and 1965's "The Girls Get Prettier." The latter hit prompted the recording and release of a studio album of the same name in 1966. The project was recorded mostly in January 1966 at the RCA Victor Studio in Nashville, Tennessee. Sessions were produced by Chet Atkins with vocal accompaniment from The Jordanaires.

The Girls Get Prettier consisted of 12 tracks. The title track was composed by well-known Nashville songwriter, Harlan Howard. It also included a song written by another Nashville writer, Cy Coben. Most of the album's remaining tracks were cover versions of songs made famous by other artists. This included "My Happiness," "I Loved You a Thousand Ways" and "Before I Met You." The album also includes Locklin's 1955 hit "Why Baby Why," which was also made successful in a different version by its composer, George Jones.

== Release and reception ==
Professional ratings
Review scores
Source	Rating
Allmusic	2.5/5 stars
Billboard	Favorable

The Girls Get Prettier was released in May 1966 via RCA Victor Records. It was Locklin's thirteenth studio project in his career. It was originally distributed as a vinyl LP, containing six songs on each side of the record. It was later made available for digital and streaming services on sites including Apple Music. The Girls Get Prettier became Locklin's first album to enter the Billboard Top Country Albums chart. It spent ten weeks on the latter chart and peaked at number 26 in July 1966. The record included two singles. The first was the album's title track, which was first issued as a single in October 1965. It spent nine weeks on the Billboard Hot Country Singles chart, reaching number 35 in February 1966. Its second single was "There's More Pretty Girls Than One." Released in July 1966, the single failed to chart. The album was reviewed favorably by Billboard magazine in 1966. The publication called the music "sincere" and stated that longtime Locklin fans would enjoy the album as a whole. It only received 2.5 out of 5 stars from Allmusic.

== Track listing ==
=== Vinyl version ===
Side one
No.	Title	Writer(s)	Length
1.	"There's More Pretty Girls Than One"	Alton Delmore; Arthur Smith	2:36
2.	"My Happiness"	Betty Peterson Blasco; Borney Bergantine	2:28
3.	"The Honey Song"	Arbie Gibson; Cliff Massey	1:58
4.	"A Good Woman's Love"	Cy Coben	2:16
5.	"The Girls Get Prettier (Every Day)"	Harlan Howard	2:00
6.	"Put Me in Your Pocket"	Waldo O'Neal	2:36

Side two
No.	Title	Writer(s)	Length
1.	"Why Baby Why"	Darrell Edwards; George Jones	2:06
2.	"I Love You a Thousand Ways"	Jim Beck; Lefty Frizzell	2:05
3.	"My Blue Eyed Jane"	Jimmie Rodgers; Lulu Belle White	2:06
4.	"Tie Me to Your Apron Strings Again"	Joe Goodwin; Larry Shay	2:05
5.	"Before I Met You"	J. William Denny; Joe "Cannonball" Lewis; Chuck Seitz	2:25
6.	"It's Another World"	Richard D. Staedtler	2:01

=== Digital version ===
The Girls Get Prettier
No.	Title	Writer(s)	Length
1.	"There's More Pretty Girls Than One"	Delmore; Smith	2:41
2.	"My Happiness"	Peterson Blasco; Bergantine	2:31
3.	"The Honey Song"	Gibson; Massey	2:02
4.	"A Good Woman's Love"	Coben	2:21
5.	"The Girls Get Prettier (Every Day)"	Howard	2:01
6.	"Put Me in Your Pocket"	O'Neal	3:10
7.	"Why Baby Why"	Edwards; Jones	2:04
8.	"I Love You a Thousand Ways"	Beck; Frizzell	2:40
9.	"My Blue Eyed Jane"	Rodgers; White	2:10
10.	"Tie Me to Your Apron Strings Again"	Goodwin; Shay	2:09
11.	"Before I Met You"	Denny; Lewis; Seitz	2:29
12.	"It's Another World"	Staedtler	2:03

== Personnel ==
All credits are adapted from the liner notes of The Girls Get Prettier.

Musical and technical personnel

- Chet Atkins – producer
- Chuck Bettis – recording engineer
- Hank Locklin – lead vocals
- Jim Malloy – recording engineer

== Chart performance ==
Chart (1966)	Peak position
US Top Country Albums (Billboard)	26

== Release history ==
Region	Date	Format	Label	Ref.
United Kingdom	May 1966	Vinyl	RCA Victor	
United States	May 1966	Vinyl	RCA Victor	
United States	2010s	Digital; Streaming	Sony Music Entertainment	
