= There Never Was a Time =

Studio album by Hank Locklin
- Released: 1977
- Studio: Singleton Sound Studio
- Genre: Country; Countrypolitan
- Label: Plantation
- Producer: Shelby Singleton

Hank Locklin chronology
Hank Locklin (1975)	There Never Was a Time (1977)	Country Hall of Fame (1978)

Singles from There Never Was a Time
- 1. "Baby I Need You" Released: February 1976; 2. "Daytime Love Affair" Released: July 1976; 3. "You Love Me, Don'cha" Released: November 1976; 4. "There Never Was a Time" Released: July 1977

There Never Was a Time is a studio album by American country music singer–songwriter Hank Locklin. It was released in 1977 via Plantation Records and contained ten tracks. It was Locklin's twenty fifth studio album released in his career and his only album for the Plantation label. The project spawned four singles released between 1976 and 1977.

== Background and content ==
For nearly twenty years, Hank Locklin recorded with RCA Victor Records where he had his biggest commercial success and released multiple albums. In the early 1970s, he left the label and recorded for MGM Records and later signed with Plantation Records. Locklin recorded There Never Was a Time under the production of Shelby Singleton at his Nashville, Tennessee studio titled Singleton Sound Studio. It was Locklin's first time working with Singleton. The album contained a total of ten tracks. There Never Was a Time included re-recordings of Locklin's previous hits for RCA: "Happy Journey" and "We're Gonna Go Fishin'." Several new tracks were also included, such as the self-penned track "Baby, I Need You." Another new recording, "You Love Me, Don'cha," was composed by Plantation recording artist Jeannie C. Riley. Webb Pierce also contributed to the track "Night Life Queen."

== Release and singles ==
There Never Was a Time was released in 1977 via Plantation Records. It was originally distributed as a vinyl LP, with five songs on each side of the record. It was later reissued in a digital format to several online music retailers, including Apple Music. There Never Was a Time spawned a total of three singles between 1976 and 1977. Its first single was issued in February 1976 via Plantation: "Baby I Need You." In July 1976, "Daytime Love Affair" was released as the album's second single. In November 1976, "You Love Me, Don'cha" was released as the album's third single. The title track was issued as the album's final single release in July 1977.

== Track listings ==
=== Vinyl version ===
Side one
No.	Title	Writer(s)	Length
1.	"Down on My Knees"	Robert J. O'Gwynn	2:28
2.	"Daytime Love Affair"	Paul L. Smith	2:47
3.	"Baby, I Need You"	Hank Locklin	3:05
4.	"You Love Me, Don'cha"	Jeannie C. Riley	2:58
5.	"We're Gonna Go Fishin'"	Tex Atchinson	2:10

Side two
No.	Title	Writer(s)	Length
1.	"Night Life Queen"	Webb Pierce; Max Powell	2:16
2.	"Happy Journey"	Charles Nowa; Fred Jacobson; Nicola Wilke	2:07
3.	"These Arms Push You Away"	Becki Bluefield	2:16
4.	"Days of Autumn Gold"	S. Carol	2:26
5.	"There Never Was a Time"	Margaret Lewis; Myra Smith	2:12

=== Digital version ===
There Never Was a Time
No.	Title	Writer(s)	Length
1.	"Down on My Knees"	O'Gwynn	2:29
2.	"Daytime Love Affair"	Smith	2:50
3.	"Baby, I Need You"	Locklin	3:06
4.	"You Love Me, Don'cha"	Riley	3:00
5.	"We're Gonna Go Fishing"	Atchinson	2:12
6.	"Night Life Queen"	Pierce; Powell	2:19
7.	"Happy Journey"	Nowa; Jacobson; Wilke	2:10
8.	"These Arms Push You Away"	Bluefield	2:18
9.	"Days of Autumn Gold"	Carol	1:51
10.	"There Never Was a Time"	Lewis; Smith	2:35

== Personnel ==
All credits are adapted from the liner notes of There Never Was a Time.

Musical and technical personnel

- Gayle Allen – Back cover artist
- Betty Cherry – Cover artist
- LeRoy Duncan – Engineer
- Hank Locklin – Lead vocals
- John Singleton – Photography
- Shelby Singleton – Producer

== Release history ==
Region	Date	Format	Label	Ref.
United States	1977	Vinyl	Plantation Records	
United States	2010s	Digital download; streaming	Plantation Records	
