= My Kind of Country Music =

Studio album by Hank Locklin
- Released: September 1965
- Recorded: 1955–1964
- Genre: Country; Nashville Sound
- Length: 22:53
- Label: RCA Camden
- Producer: Chet Atkins; Steve Sholes

Hank Locklin chronology
Hank Locklin Sings Eddy Arnold (1965)	My Kind of Country Music (1965)	Once Over Lightly (1965)

Singles from My Kind of Country Music
- 1. "Your Heart Is an Island" Released: June 1955; 2. "Wooden Soldier" Released: October 1963; 3. "I Was Coming Home to You" Released: July 1964; 4. "I'm Blue" Released: February 1965

My Kind of Country Music is a studio album by American country singer–songwriter Hank Locklin. It was released in September 1965 via RCA Camden records. My Kind of Country Music was Locklin's eleventh studio album project and his third studio release for the RCA Camden subsidiary label. The album contained a total of ten tracks, of which included four singles that been released prior to the album. It received favorable reviews from critics and publications.

== Background and content ==
Although signed to the RCA label since 1955, Locklin would not have his biggest success until 1960s's "Please Help Me, I'm Falling." A number one country hit and crossover pop hit, the song elevated his career and helped him have further hits with the label. Further hits facilitated the record label to release studio albums of Locklin's material. Several of these albums were issued on RCA Victor's "budget" label subsidiary: RCA Camden. My Kind of Country Music would be Locklin's third studio release on the budget series.

The project consisted of ten tracks. It was recorded mostly between 1963 and 1964, but also featured several un-issued songs recorded in 1955. All tracks were recorded in Nashville, Tennessee. The original 1955 recording sessions were produced by Steve Sholes. Later sessions in 1963 and 1964 were produced by Chet Atkins. Of its ten tracks, only "These Ruins Belong to You" was co-written by Locklin. The album's first seven tracks were the album's newest material, recorded between 1963 and 1964. The remaining three tracks were first cut in 1955 but had not been released on albums.

== Release and reception ==
My Kind of Country Music was released in September 1965 on RCA Camden records. It was Locklin's eleventh studio album in his recording career. The project was distributed as a vinyl LP, containing five songs on both sides of the record. Four singles were included on the album. The earliest single included was the track, "Your Heart Is an Island." It was first released in June 1955. The second single included was "Wooden Soldier," which was first released in October 1963. It was the project's only charting single, spending four weeks on the Billboard Hot Country Singles chart and peaking at number 41. Its next single, "I Was Coming Home to You," was issued in July 1964 while "I'm Blue" was released in February 1965. My Kind of Country Music received 4.5 out of 5 stars from Thom Owens of Allmusic. "My Kind of Country may only contain one hit but the LP demonstrates Hank Locklin's gift for tear-jerking ballads and pure traditional country," Owens wrote.

== Track listing ==
Side one
No.	Title	Writer(s)	Length
1.	"I Was Coming Home to You"	Kendall Hayes; Jimmy Rule	2:29
2.	"I'm Blue"	Mirriam Eddy	2:00
3.	"Hello Heartache"	Ben Raleigh; Art Wayne	2:00
4.	"Wooden Soldier"	Lawton Williams	2:27
5.	"You Never Want to Love Me"	Carl Belew	2:24

Side two
No.	Title	Writer(s)	Length
1.	"Give Your Wife a Kiss for Me"	Victor Millrose; Doc Pomus; Vini Poncia	2:29
2.	"Kiss on the Door"	Williams	2:21
3.	"Your Heart Is an Island"	Cy Coben	2:10
4.	"These Ruins Belong to You"	Madge Broadway; Willa Locklin	2:22
5.	"You're Out of Step"	Donn Reynolds; Slim Stuart	2:11

== Personnel ==
All credits are adapted from the liner notes of My Kind of Country Music.

Musical and technical personnel

- Chet Atkins – producer
- Ethel Gabriel – A&R coordinator
- Hank Locklin – lead vocals
- Steve Sholes – producer

== Release history ==
Region	Date	Format	Label	Ref.
Canada	September 1965	Vinyl	RCA Camden	
United States	September 1965	Vinyl	RCA Camden	
