= The Gloryland Way =

Studio album by Hank Locklin
- Released: August 1966
- Recorded: April 1966
- Studio: RCA Victor Studio
- Genre: Country; religious
- Label: RCA Victor
- Producer: Chet Atkins

Hank Locklin chronology
The Girls Get Prettier (1966)	The Gloryland Way (1966)	The Best of Hank Locklin (1966)

The Gloryland Way is a studio album by American country music singer–songwriter Hank Locklin. It was released in August 1966 via RCA Victor Records and was produced by Chet Atkins. It was Locklin's first studio release to contain entirely religious music, specifically gospel music. The project was also Locklin's fourteenth studio album. After its release, the album received positive reception from critics.

== Background, release and reception ==
Hank Locklin was known in his music career for recording concept albums. Previously, he had released concept albums that centered around Irish music and tribute albums to Eddy Arnold and Roy Acuff. The Gloryland Way was Locklin's first concept record to center around gospel music. It was recorded mostly in April 1966 at the RCA Victor Studio, located in Nashville, Tennessee. The sessions were produced by Chet Atkins, Locklin's longtime record producer at RCA Victor Records. The Gloryland Way consisted of 12 tracks. Three of the album's tracks were composed by Locklin himself: "That Inner Glow," "The Upper Room" and "Fifty Miles of Elbow Room." The remainder of the album's tracks were composed by other songwriters and performers. This included a cover of "Kneel at the Cross," which was written by Charles E. Moody. The final track, "Wings of a Dove," was first a hit for Ferlin Husky.

The Gloryland Way was released in August 1966 via RCA Victor Records. It was Locklin's fourteenth studio album released in his career. It was distributed as a vinyl LP, with six tracks on either side of the record. It was later issued digitally for music downloads and streaming services, including Apple Music. The project did not spawn any known singles upon its release. While "The Upper Room" had been released as a single several years prior, it was re-recorded for this album. The album received a positive response from Billboard magazine upon its release in 1966. Writers of the publication called The Gloryland Way, "a package of gospel sides with a world of life and spirit." The writers also praised the album's unique gospel approach, in comparison to his previous studio releases.

== Track listing ==
=== Vinyl version ===
Side one
No.	Title	Writer(s)	Length
1.	"Anywhere Is Home"	Bill Walker	2:36
2.	"Fifty Miles of Elbow Room"	Hank Locklin	2:26
3.	"The Good Book Song"	Karl Davis	2:21
4.	"Lead Me Gently Home Father"	Gene Clark; Will Thompson	3:20
5.	"It Is Love"	Edwin Perry; James Rowe	2:18
6.	"The Upper Room"	Locklin; Frank Peterson	2:56

Side two
No.	Title	Writer(s)	Length
1.	"The Gloryland Way"	J.S. Torbelt	2:15
2.	"Kneel at the Cross"	Charles E. Moody	2:28
3.	"Wings of a Dove"	Bob Ferguson	2:57
4.	"Come and Dine"	S.H. Bolton; Charles Windmeyer	2:32
5.	"Just Over in Gloryland"	James Acuff; Emmet Dean	2:36
6.	"That Inner Glow"	Locklin; Peterson	2:37

=== Digital version ===
The Gloryland Way
No.	Title	Writer(s)	Length
1.	"Anywhere Is Home"	Walker	2:40
2.	"Fifty Miles of Elbow Room"	Locklin	2:30
3.	"The Good Book Song"	Davis	2:24
4.	"Lead Me Gently Home Father"	Clark; Thompson	3:23
5.	"It Is Love"	Perry; Rowe	2:23
6.	"The Upper Room"	Locklin; Peterson	3:00
7.	"The Gloryland Way"	Torbelt	2:19
8.	"Kneel at the Cross"	Moody	2:32
9.	"Wings of a Dove"	Ferguson	3:01
10.	"Come and Dine"	Bolton; Windmeyer	2:32
11.	"Just Over in Gloryland"	Acuff; Dean	2:39
12.	"That Inner Glow"	Locklin; Peterson	2:38

== Personnel ==
All credits are adapted from the liner notes of The Gloryland Way.

Musical and technical personnel

- Chet Atkins – producer
- Hank Locklin – lead vocals
- The Imperials Quartet – background vocals
- William Vandevort – recording engineer

== Release history ==
Region	Date	Format	Label	Ref.
United Kingdom	August 1966	Vinyl	RCA Victor	
United States	August 1966	Vinyl	RCA Victor	
United States	2010s	Digital; Streaming	Sony Music Entertainment	
