= McLellan, Florida =

- Unincorporated community
- Location within Florida
- Coordinates: 30°59′12″N 86°53′11″W
- Country: United States
- State: Florida
- County: Santa Rosa
- Elevation: 282 ft (86 m)
- Time zone: UTC-6 (Central (CST))
  - Summer (DST): UTC-5 (CDT)
- Area code: 850
- GNIS feature ID: 294851

McLellan (also McLellen) is an unincorporated community in Santa Rosa County, Florida, United States.

== Notable people ==
- Hank Locklin, country music singer, was born in McLellan.
