= The Country Hall of Fame (song) =

Single by Hank Locklin

from the album Country Hall of Fame
- B-side: "Evergreen" (U.S.); "Hasta Luego" (Germany)
- Released: September 1968
- Recorded: August 18, 1967
- Studio: RCA Victor Studio
- Genre: Country; Nashville Sound
- Length: 3:08
- Label: RCA Victor
- Songwriter: Karl Davis
- Producer: Chet Atkins

Hank Locklin singles chronology
"Nashville Women" (1967)	"The Country Hall of Fame" (1968)	"Love Song for You" (1968)

"The Country Hall of Fame" is a song written by Karl Davis that was originally recorded by American country singer–songwriter Hank Locklin. It was released as a single in 1967 and became a top ten hit on the American country chart the following year. It was Locklin's first major hit in several years and would be released on an album of the same name.

== Background and content ==
By 1968, Hank Locklin had not had a major hit in nearly four years. He had his biggest commercial success in the early part of the decade. Songs like "Please Help Me, I'm Falling," became a number one single and crossed over to the pop chart. "The Country Hall of Fame" would be his first major hit in several years. The song was composed by Karl Davis, who wrote it as a tribute to country performers who had been inducted into the Country Music Hall of Fame and Museum. Performers such as Jim Reeves and Patsy Cline are mentioned in the song's lyric. Locklin would record the song on August 18, 1967, at the RCA Victor Studio in Nashville, Tennessee. The session was produced by Chet Atkins, who was his long-time record producer at the RCA label. Three additional tracks were cut at the same session, including the single release's eventual B-side.

== Release and chart performance ==
"The Country Hall of Fame" was released as a single in September 1967 via RCA Victor Records. It was Locklin's third and final single released that year. It was issued as a seven inch single with an A-side and a B-side. The single was included with the B-side, "Evergreen," in its original American release. In 1968, it would be released in Germany with a different B-side, "Hasta Luego (See You Later)." The single spent a total of 20 weeks on the Billboard Hot Country Singles chart, peaking at number eight in January 1968. It was Locklin's first top ten hit on the Billboard country chart since 1962's "Happy Journey," which climbed to number ten. It would also be Locklin's final top ten hit on the chart. "The Country Hall of Fame" was later released on Locklin's studio album of the same name.

== Track listings ==
7" vinyl single (United States)

- "The Country Hall of Fame" – 3:08
- "Evergreen" – 2:18

7" vinyl single (Germany)

- "The Country Hall of Fame" – 3:08
- "Hasta Luego (See You Later)" – 2:21

== Chart performance ==
Chart (1967–68)	Peak position
US Hot Country Songs (Billboard)	8
