= Hank Locklin (1975 album) =

Studio album by Hank Locklin
- Released: June 1975
- Recorded: August – November 1974
- Genre: Country
- Label: MGM
- Producer: Mel Tillis

Hank Locklin chronology
The Mayor of McLellan, Florida (1972)	Hank Locklin (1975)	There Never Was a Time (1977)

Singles from Hank Locklin
- 1. "Send Me Your Coffee Cup" Released: September 1974; 2. "Sweetest Mistake" Released: January 1975; 3. "Irish Eyes" Released: April 1975

Hank Locklin is a studio album by American country music singer–songwriter Hank Locklin. It was released in June 1975 via MGM Records and contained ten tracks of new material. The album spawned three singles between 1974 and 1975. It was the twenty fourth studio release of Locklin's career and the second to be self-titled.

== Background and release ==
Hank Locklin spent nearly two decades recording for RCA Victor Records before leaving the label in the 1970s. He later recorded for several more labels, including MGM Records. Locklin recorded the tracks for the album in Nashville, Tennessee, between 1974 and 1975. The sessions were produced by country singer and songwriter, Mel Tillis. It was Locklin's first (and only) album produced by Tillis. The self-titled effort contained ten tracks of new material. Three of the tracks were composed by Locklin himself: "Send Me Your Coffee Cup", "True Love Is Always True" and "Irish Eyes." He also cut a track by Tillis, which appeared as the final cut on the album titled "Hang My Picture in Your Heart." It also included a track written by Nashville songwriters Danny Dill ("Come in Out of the Rain") and Wayne Walker ("If I Throw Away My Pride").

Hank Locklin was released in June 1975 on MGM Records. It was Locklin's twenty fourth studio album issued in his career. The album was offered as a vinyl LP, containing five songs on either side. The album spawned three singles, which were issued on MGM between 1974 and 1975. In September 1974, the first single was released: "Send Me Your Coffee Cup." In January 1975, "Sweetest Mistake" was issued as the album's second single. The final single was released in April 1975, "Irish Eyes."

== Track listing ==
Side one
No.	Title	Writer(s)	Length
1.	"Sweetest Mistake"	Rochelle Frazier	2:47
2.	"Send Me Your Coffee Cup"	Hank Locklin	2:37
3.	"Scarlet Wings"	Damon Black	2:31
4.	"Come in Out of the Rain"	Danny Dill	2:56
5.	"If I Throw Away My Pride"	Wayne P. Walker	2:29

Side two
No.	Title	Writer(s)	Length
1.	"Irish Eyes"	George Carroll; Locklin	3:01
2.	"Please Let Me Have You"	Johnny Gore	2:19
3.	"I Love My Meemaw"	Locklin; Walker	2:36
4.	"True Love Is Always True"	Locklin; Walker	2:56
5.	"Woman in the Back of My Mind"	Roger Jaudon; Ronal McCown	2:47
6.	"Hang My Picture in Your Heart"	Mel Tillis	3:00

== Release history ==
Region	Date	Format	Label	Ref.
Canada	June 1975	Vinyl	MGM Records	
United States	June 1975	Vinyl	MGM Records	
