= Let Me Be the One (Hank Locklin song) =

Single by Hank Locklin
- B-side: "I'm Tired Of Bummin' Around"
- Released: July 1953
- Recorded: May 4–5, 1953; Castle Studio, Tulane Hotel; Nashville, Tennessee
- Genre: Country
- Length: 2:30
- Label: 4 Star Records 45-1641
- Songwriters: Paul Blevins, Joe Hobson and W.S. Stevenson
- Producer: Owen Bradley

Hank Locklin singles chronology
"Red Rose" (1953)	"Let Me Be the One" (1953)	"Lessons in Love" (1953)

"Let Me Be the One" is a 1953 song written by Paul Blevins, Joe Hobson and W.S. Stevenson, and made famous by the then up-and-coming country singer Hank Locklin.

== Background ==
Locklin, a fledgling country star who had formed a backing band called the Rocky Mountain Boys, had recorded for a variety of small regional labels, including Gold Star and Royalty. Success did not come his way until he joined with 4 Star Records, when 1949's "The Same Sweet Girl" reached No. 8 on the Billboard country chart. However, it was not until 1953 when he finally broke through to the top of the chart with "Let Me Be the One." While sustained success did not come until the mid-1950s, "Let Me Be the One" paved the way for Locklin's future successes at the Decca and RCA recording labels, where he became associated with such songs as "Why Baby Why," "Geisha Girl," "Send Me the Pillow That You Dream On" and "Please Help Me, I'm Falling."

== Chart performance ==
In December 1953, the song was Hank Locklin's first No. 1 hit, spending three weeks atop the Billboard country chart.
