= Hank Locklin =

American country music singer (1918–2009)

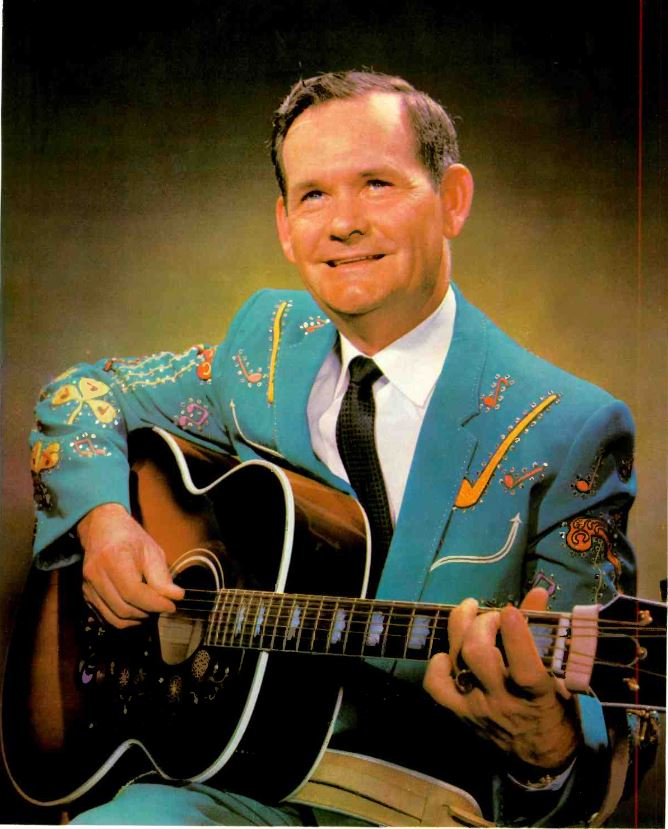
- Locklin in 1966
- Born: Lawrence Hankins Locklin; February 15, 1918; McLellan, Florida, U.S.
- Died: March 8, 2009 (aged 91); Brewton, Alabama, U.S.
- Occupations: Singer; songwriter
- Years active: 1947–2007
- Spouses: Willa Jean Murphy (m. 1938, divorced); Anita Crooks (m. 1970)
- Children: 6
- Musical career
- Genres: Country; gospel
- Instruments: Vocals; guitar
- Labels: 4 Star; Decca; RCA Victor; MGM; Plantation; Coldwater; Yell
- Website: hanklocklin.com

Lawrence Hankins Locklin (February 15, 1918 – March 8, 2009) was an American country music singer and songwriter. He had 70 chart singles, including two number-one hits on Billboard's country chart. His biggest hits included "Send Me the Pillow You Dream On" and his signature "Please Help Me, I'm Falling". The latter also went to number eight on the Billboard Hot 100 pop music chart. Billboard's 100th anniversary issue listed it as the second-most successful country single of the rock and roll era. It sold over one million copies, and was awarded a gold disc by the Recording Industry Association of America.

Locklin was born and raised in Florida. He developed a fondness for country music following an accident in his childhood. He learned to play the guitar during his recovery and began performing locally, as well. In his early adulthood, he formed his own band called the Rocky Mountain Playboys, which played gigs and performed on local radio. Locklin was heard singing during one of these gigs, which led to his first recording contract in 1949. He had his first major hit on the Billboard country chart the same year. His 1953 single "Let Me Be the One" was his first to top the country chart.

In 1955, Locklin signed with RCA Victor Records and under the production of Chet Atkins, he had his biggest success as a country artist. He had a string of major hits during the late 1950s and early 1960s. He also joined the cast of the Grand Ole Opry and remained a member for nearly 50 years. He became a major concert attraction internationally, as well, touring overseas in Europe beginning in the 1960s and '70s. Locklin also recorded a handful of concept albums during this period, which made him among the genre's first artists to release albums centered around a theme. He later recorded for other labels, including MGM, Plantation, and Coldwater. Despite his country success, Locklin never lived in Nashville, choosing to stay in Florida. Locklin died in 2009 at the age of 91.

== Early life ==
Locklin was born on February 15, 1918 in McLellan, Florida, where he was also raised. He was the youngest of four children born to a musically inclined family. Although he had a fondness for music in his early years, he became more interested following an accident. At age 9, he was hit by a school bus. "It almost mashed me flatter than a fritter," he recalled. He learned to play the guitar during his recovery and continued pursuing music through his teenaged years. He also won several talent contests and performed at a radio station in Pensacola, Florida. To pursue his music full-time, Locklin dropped out of high school. However, working as a musician amounted to a small income. In one instance, he recalled being paid $2 for working a gig at a Florida roadhouse. To make ends meet, he worked odd jobs, including working on a farm and a shipyard.

During the early 1940s, Locklin was dismissed from participating in World War II due to the bus accident in his childhood (which still affected his leg). Instead, he continued performing. Locklin performed in nearby states, including regular gigs with bands in Mobile, Alabama. He also began composing his own material, largely influenced by the music of Ernest Tubb. He then joined the band of country musician Jimmy Swan and made regular concert appearances. Locklin formed his own backing band in 1947 named the Rocky Mountain Playboys. The group performed regularly on radio stations. Their sponsor was businessman Elmer Laird, who intended to form a record label to get Locklin's music recorded. He was killed in a stabbing incident, though, shortly after his proposal. Instead, Locklin's association with producer Pappy Daily helped him sign with 4 Star Records.

== Career ==
=== 1949–1954: Early success ===
Locklin secured a contract with 4 Star Records through his association with Pappy Daily. Daily brought him to the attention of Bill McCall of 4 Star, where he signed his first recording contract in 1949. Also in 1949, Locklin joined the cast of the Louisiana Hayride in Shreveport, Louisiana. He had his first major hit in 1949 with a self-penned single titled "The Same Sweet Girl". The song reached the top 10 of the Billboard country singles chart, peaking at number eight. Despite having a hit, Locklin did not see many royalties from its success. Because his recording contract allowed for McCall to gain all of the publishing rights, McCall also made all the money from its success. "I never made no money with him. My understanding was that he liked to go to Vegas. I guess Bill was just a guy who liked to take everything," Locklin recalled in 2001.

Locklin's follow-up singles did not become hits, which caused further financial difficulties. He even recorded the original version of his future hit "Send Me the Pillow You Dream On". Although it was not a hit, Locklin did recall the song getting a warm reception after he performed it live on a radio show. By this time, McCall had arranged for Locklin's material to be leased to Decca Records, which was headed by Owen Bradley. With this partnership, he had his second major hit in 1953 titled "Let Me Be the One". The single became his first to reach the number-one position on the Billboard country chart. "Let Me Be the One" spent a total of three weeks at the country chart summit. His follow-up 4 Star releases were unsuccessful. Furthermore, Locklin still was receiving little royalties from his success with the label. For McCall to not claim them as his own, he started composing songs under his wife's name. Cuts such as "These Ruins Belong to You" were written under the pen name Willa. After an argument with McCall, he left 4 Star Records.

=== 1955–1974: Move to RCA Records and biggest success ===
In 1955, Locklin switched to the larger RCA Records. Collaborating with producer Chet Atkins, Locklin developed a simpler musical style. His recordings often included heavy acoustic guitar and piano production. These styles were individualized by that of the Nashville A-Team, a group of studio musicians who included Floyd Cramer and several others. In 1956, he had his first hit with RCA titled "Why Baby Why". The single reached the top 10 of the Billboard Country and Western Records Most Played By Folk Disk Jockeys chart, becoming his first major hit in three years. It was followed in 1957 by "Geisha Girl". The song reached number five on the Billboard country chart, and was his first to reach the pop chart, climbing to number 66. The hit was included on his debut studio album Foreign Love. Marketed toward overseas servicemen, the record was one of several concept albums released by Locklin during his career. In 1958, Locklin had major hits with "It's a Little More Like Heaven" and a remake of "Send Me the Pillow You Dream On".

Locklin's singles over the next two years were unsuccessful. In 1960, a song composed by Hal Blair and Don Robertson was brought to his attention. Both writers had the idea of writing a "cheating song" that centered around a man's conscience. Blair brought in elements from his own marital troubles to write the song. Their finished product was the tune "Please Help Me, I'm Falling". The song was first offered to Jim Reeves, who turned it down. Locklin believed it to be a hit and decided to cut it in the studio. Released as a single in 1960, "Please Help Me, I'm Falling" reached number one on the Billboard country songs chart in May. It spent a total of 14 weeks at the top of country charts. It also became Locklin's biggest hit on the Billboard pop chart, reaching the number-eight position in August 1960. In the United Kingdom, the song reached the top 10 of the national charts, as well. "Please Help Me, I'm Falling" became the biggest hit of Locklin's career and his biggest-selling single. The song's success led to an invitation to join the Grand Ole Opry cast, which he accepted in 1960. He remained with the program for 49 years.

"Please Help Me, I'm Falling"
In 1960, "Please Help Me, I'm Falling" was released on RCA Victor and became Locklin's best-known hit.

Locklin did not reach the top of the country charts again, but he continued having commercial success with RCA Victor. In 1961, he had three top-20 hits with "One Step Ahead of My Past", "From Here to There to You", and "You're the Reason". In November 1961, the single "Happy Birthday to Me" (written by Bill Anderson) reached number seven on the Billboard country songs chart. It was followed by "Happy Journey", which went to number 10 on the country singles list in February 1962. An album of the same name followed in 1962, and it included the top-20 single "We're Gonna Go Fishin'". The song also became a major hit in the United Kingdom. His 1964 song "Followed Closely by My Teardrops" was his only major hit for several years.

Locklin expanded his recording of concept albums during the 1960s. This began with a tribute effort to Roy Acuff titled A Tribute to Roy Acuff: The King of Country Music. It featured a collection of Acuff's best-known songs, including "Wabash Cannonball" and "Once More". The album was reviewed positively by Billboard in 1962. Writers noted their appreciation for the fact that Locklin chose to sing Acuff's songs in his own style rather than emulate him. In later years, Allmusic rated the album three out of five stars. With an expanding fan base in Ireland, Locklin recorded 1963's Irish Songs, Country Style. The following year, he recorded a studio album of Hank Williams' songs. Allmusic's Greg Adams rated it 2 1/2 out of 5 stars, calling Locklin "a good yodeler [who] seems to struggle a little." Meanwhile, 1965's My Kind of Country Music fared better with critics. Reviewer Thom Owens gave the release 4 1/2 stars and praised his "gift for tear-jerking ballads and pure traditional country." Locklin's 1966 studio release The Girls Get Prettier was his first to chart the Billboard Top Country Albums list, reaching number 26.

In 1968, Locklin returned with his first top 10 hit in several years titled "The Country Hall of Fame". Its corresponding studio effort of the same name was also successful, reaching number 20 on the country albums chart. Allmusic gave it a warm response in its review, calling it "one of his best albums of the late '60s." Following its release, Locklin saw declining radio success on the American country charts. He had his last top 40 single on the Billboard country songs survey was 1969's "Where the Blue of the Night Meets the Gold of the Day". At the start of the early 1970s, he spent time touring and performing in Europe, where he became popular. He was among country music's early artists to perform at military bases and clubs in Europe. He also toured with producer Chet Atkins in Japan during the early 1970s. Locklin remained with RCA Victor until 1974. Among the highlights in his remaining RCA years was a collaborative record with Danny Davis and the Nashville Brass in 1970. It featured re-recordings of some his bigger hits. His final album for the label was 1972's The Mayor of McLellan, Florida.

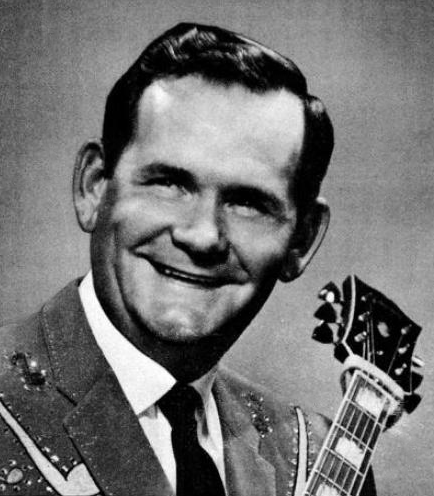
Locklin in a trade ad for Billboard magazine, 1968

=== 1975–2007: Later years ===
Following his departure from RCA Victor Records, Locklin recorded for various other labels, beginning with MGM Records. In 1975, his self-titled studio album was released on the label and included a collection of 10 tracks. The record was produced by fellow country artist Mel Tillis. Three singles were spawned from the album, but failed to become commercially successful. He then moved to Plantation Records in 1977 where he recorded the studio record There Never Was a Time. It was produced by Shelby Singleton and featured 10 tracks of original material. Four singles were spawned from the album, which were unsuccessful. He also turned his attention to other opportunities during this period. In the 1970s, Locklin hosted a handful of television programs in Dallas, Texas and Houston, Texas. He also continued performing overseas, particularly in Ireland. He also remained an active performer on the Grand Ole Opry. During this period, he was made the honorary mayor in his hometown of McLellan, Florida. The honor was given to him after he was nicknamed the "Mayor of McLellan" by radio and television host Ralph Emery.

Locklin's career began slowing after the 1970s. In the early 2000s, his son (Hank Adam Locklin) encouraged his father to return to the recording studio. In 2001, Locklin's first album in decades was released, titled Generations in Song. The project was produced by his son and featured session instrumentation from some of the original Nashville A-Team. It also featured collaborations with Vince Gill, Dolly Parton, and others. The album received positive reviews from writers and critics following its release. Bruce Eder of AllMusic gave it four stars and praised Locklin's voice: "His voice sounds at least three decades fresher than it has a right to, and the harmonizing and the playing are first-rate, along with the arrangements, which makes this more than an exercise in nostalgia." No Depression also gave the album a warm response, calling its production to have "clean arrangements" that allow his "clear voice to shine through." Ken Burke of Country Standard Time also gave the album a positive review. "The Florida-born tenor can boast not only that he clawed his way out of dire poverty, but built a musical legacy that he can share with his family," Burke wrote.

In 2006, Locklin released his final album titled By the Grace of God: The Gospel Album. The album was a collection of Gospel songs that featured collaborations with the Oak Ridge Boys and the Jordanaires. The record was issued on Yell Records. It was reviewed favorably by Larry Stephens of Country Standard Time, who praised Locklin's youthful voice and songwriting effort. Also in 2006, Locklin appeared on Country Pop Legends in which he performed "Send Me the Pillow That You Dream On", and "Please Help Me I'm Falling". In his final years of performing, Locklin continued appearing at the Grand Ole Opry. In September 2007, he made his last appearance at the venue.

== Personal life and death ==
Locklin was married twice. His first marriage to Willa Jean Murphy began in 1938, but ended in divorce. In 1970, he married Anita Crooks of Brewton, Alabama. He had two sons and four daughters, 12 grandchildren, and eight great-grandchildren. Among his children is his son Hank Adam Locklin, a producer and musician. Locklin's son helped manage his career and produce some of his later records. In the 1960s, Locklin built a ranch house called the Singing L, located in McClellan.

He moved to Brewton, where he remained throughout his later years, and died there at home in the early morning on March 8, 2009. He is buried in the United Methodist Church Mount Carmel Cemetery, located in Jay, Florida. Following his death, longtime friend Sandy Wyatt stated, "Not only was (Hank) a great artist, [but also] he was the nicest man you’d ever meet."

== Musical styles ==
Locklin's musical style stems from country music's honky-tonk and Nashville Sound subgenres. In his early years, Locklin was primarily a honky-tonk singer who also incorporated elements of Texas shuffles. His early records on the 4 Star label embodied this particular style. His early songs also took influence from other artists, including Hank Williams. In reviewing Locklin's 1997 compilation, Bruce Eder wrote that songs such as "Born to Ramble" drew a strong influence from Williams. Locklin also emulated the musical styles of Ernest Tubb (among the artists responsible for the formation of country's honky-tonk style).

Locklin's sound and style became individualized once he signed with RCA Records in 1955. His producer Chet Atkins helped create his image by incorporating a softer Nashville Sound instrumentation. Writer Greg Adams described Locklin's RCA years as having "sweet vocal choruses" backed by horn and string sections. In a 2001 interview, Locklin recounted how Chet Atkins created musical arrangements by using the guitar he kept in his office: "Then, all of a sudden he'd pick it up and hit a chord or two on something or other that floated through his head. He was so good, and he really helped me a lot with RCA."

== Legacy ==
Locklin is considered by many writers to be one of country music's "great tenors". Critics have noted that his distinctive high-pitched singing made him stand out from other performers of the era. In a review of the compilation RCA Country Legends, Stephen Thomas Erlewine highlighted this characteristic: "Locklin held firm to his country ideals, and whittled down to the essentials as they are here, they offer proof of why country connoisseurs consider him among the best pure singers in the genre." Locklin also helped define the Nashville Sound subgenre of country music. This particular style brought a cosmopolitan feel and a smooth quality to country music. "I’ve been blessed to have hit songs that are timeless," Locklin commented in 2001.

Locklin's legacy can be linked with his 49-year membership to the Grand Ole Opry. He was known for his "folksy" style of humor and often joked with his Opry audience by saying, "We’ll treat you so many ways you’re bound to like one of ’em." In 2007, he was inducted to the Florida Artists Hall of Fame. In November 2020, PBS aired a documentary on Locklin's career and legacy titled Hank Locklin: Country Music's Timeless Tenor. Fellow country artists spoke of his influence on their careers, including Dolly Parton and Dwight Yoakam.

== Discography ==
Studio albums

- 1958: Foreign Love
- 1960: Please Help Me, I'm Falling
- 1962: Happy Journey
- 1962: A Tribute to Roy Acuff: The King of Country Music
- 1962: Hank Locklin
- 1963: This Song Is Just for You
- 1963: The Ways of Life
- 1964: Irish Songs, Country Style
- 1964: Hank Locklin Sings Hank Williams
- 1965: Hank Locklin Sings Eddy Arnold
- 1965: My Kind of Country Music
- 1965: Once Over Lightly
- 1966: The Girls Get Prettier
- 1966: The Gloryland Way
- 1967: Send Me the Pillow You Dream On and Other Great Country Hits
- 1967: Nashville Women
- 1968: Country Hall of Fame
- 1968: My Love Song for You
- 1968: Softly
- 1969: Lookin' Back
- 1970: Hank Locklin & Danny Davis & the Nashville Brass (with Danny Davis)
- 1970: Bless Her Heart...I Love Her
- 1972: The Mayor of McLellan, Florida
- 1975: Hank Locklin
- 1977: There Never Was a Time
- 1978: Country Hall of Fame
- 1979: All Kinds of Everything
- 2001: Generations in Song
- 2006: By the Grace of God: The Gospel Album

== Awards and nominations ==
Year	Nominee / work	Award	Result	Ref.
1960	Grand Ole Opry	Inducted as a member	Won	
1960	Grammy Awards	Best Country & Western Record for "Please Help Me, I'm Falling"	Nominated	
1964	Grammy Awards	Best Country & Western Vocal Performance – Male for Hank Locklin Sings Hank Williams	Nominated	
