= We're Gonna Go Fishin' =

Single by Hank Locklin

from the album The Ways of Life
- B-side: "Welcome Home Mister Blues"
- Released: May 1962
- Recorded: April 13, 1962
- Studio: RCA Victor Studio
- Genre: Country; Nashville Sound
- Length: 2:05
- Label: RCA Victor
- Songwriter: Tex Atchison
- Producer: Chet Atkins

Hank Locklin singles chronology
"Happy Journey" (1961)	"We're Gonna Go Fishin'" (1962)	"Wabash Cannonball" (1962)

"We're Gonna Go Fishin'" is a song written by Tex Atchison that was originally recorded by American country singer–songwriter Hank Locklin. In 1962, it was released as a single and became a major hit on the American country chart and in the United Kingdom. It would later be released on Locklin's 1963 album, The Ways of Life.

== Background, release and chart performance ==
Hank Locklin reached the zenith of his commercial success with the 1960 single "Please Help Me, I'm Falling." The song topped the American country charts and also crossed over into the pop market, becoming a top ten hit there. Its success elevated Locklin's career and he had further fits after the single. These further hits included "One Step Ahead of My Past" and "Happy Journey" and "We're Gonna Go Fishin'." The song was composed by Tex Atchison. "We're Gonna Go Fishin'" was recorded on April 13, 1962 at the RCA Victor Studio, located in Nashville, Tennessee. It was produced by Chet Atkins. The song's eventual B-side was recorded during the same studio session.

"We're Gonna Go Fishin'" was released as a single in May 1962 via RCA Victor Records. The single was released as a seven-inch RPM record, containing "We're Gonna Go Fishin'" as the A-side and "Welcome Home Mister Blues" as the B-side. The song spent a total of 11 weeks on the Billboard Hot Country and Western Sides chart, peaking at number 14 in August 1962. The song became Locklin's sixth major since the number one success of "Please Help Me, I'm Falling" in 1960. In the United Kingdom, it became his third charting single where it would reach a peak position of 18 on the UK Singles Chart. It was later released on Locklin's 1962 studio album, also titled The Ways of Life.

== Track listing ==
7 inch vinyl single

- "We're Gonna Go Fishin'" – 2:05
- "Welcome Home Mister Blues" – 2:24

== Chart performance ==
Chart (1962)	Peak position
UK Singles Chart (The Official Charts Company)	18
US Hot Country Songs (Billboard)	14
