= The Same Sweet Girl =

Single by Hank Locklin
- B-side: "The Last Look at Mother"
- Released: April 1949
- Recorded: March 1949
- Studio: ACA Studio
- Genre: Country; Honky-tonk
- Label: 4 Star
- Songwriter: Hank Locklin

Hank Locklin singles chronology
"I Worship You" (1949)	"The Same Sweet Girl" (1949)	"Born to Ramble" (1949)

"The Same Sweet Girl" is a song written and originally recorded by American country singer–songwriter, Hank Locklin. It was released as a single via 4 Star Records in 1949. The song became Locklin's first major hit as a recording artist, reaching the top ten of the Billboard country chart. Since its release, it has been reissued several times on compilation records.

== Background and content ==
Locklin had composed "The Same Sweet Girl" after several years performing in the southeastern region of the United States. He had been gaining notoriety performing with his backing band titled "The Rocky Mountain Playboys." Locklin signed his first recording contract with his band under the Gold Star label. Without much success, he moved to 4 Star Records, where he would record "The Same Sweet Girl." The song was composed for Locklin's first wife, Willa Locklin, whom he would later divorce. It was recorded in March 1949 in the ACA Studio, which was located in Houston, Texas. In the same session, Locklin also cut "The Last Look at Mother," which would later be released on the opposite side of the single release. It was only Locklin's third studio session.

== Release and reception ==
"The Same Sweet Girl" was released as a single in April 1949 on the 4 Star label. It was Locklin's first single release with the label and would also be his first major hit. The song became a top ten hit, reaching number eight on the Billboard's Country & Western Records Most Played By Folk Disk Jockeys chart. In its original release, the single was issued as a 78 RPM record, containing "The Last Look at Mother" on its B-side.

The song would later be re-recorded several times and would later appear on several compilation albums, including 1997's Send Me the Pillow You Dream On box set by Bear Family Records. In his review of the box set, Bruce Eder of Allmusic commented that Locklin's earliest recordings (which includes "The Same Sweet Girl") incorporated a more traditional musical style: "They present Locklin doing a rougher, harder honky-tonk brand of music, derived from Texas dance-band roots, but different from the Nashville countrypolitan sound with which he achieved lasting fame -- compared to his later, softer material, this stuff rocks."

== Track listing ==
78 PM single

- "The Same Sweet Girl"
- "The Last Look at Mother"

== Charts ==
=== Weekly charts ===
Chart (1949)	Peak position
Country & Western Records Most Played By Folk Disk Jockeys (Billboard)	8

== Personnel ==
All credits are adapted from the box set, Send Me the Pillow You Dream On.

- Lew Frisby – bass
- Hank Locklin – lead vocals
- Sleepy Short – fiddle
- J.D. Standlee – steel guitar
