= Foreign Love =

Studio album by Hank Locklin
- Released: January 1958
- Recorded: December 1957
- Studio: RCA Studio
- Genres: Country; Nashville sound
- Label: RCA Victor
- Producer: Chet Atkins

Hank Locklin chronology
Foreign Love (1958)	Please Help Me, I'm Falling (1960)

Singles from Foreign Love
- 1. "Geisha Girl" Released: July 1957

Foreign Love is a studio album by American country singer-songwriter Hank Locklin. It was released in January 1958 via RCA Victor Records and was produced by Chet Atkins. It was the Locklin's debut studio album in his recording career. It was also a concept album that focused around the theme of love overseas. The album would be one of many Locklin concept records issued by RCA Victor until 1972. Foreign Love featured his major hit from 1957, "Geisha Girl." It was received favorably by critics in years following its release.

== Background and content ==
In 1955, Hank Locklin signed with the RCA Victor label. Under the production of Chet Atkins he had his biggest success, beginning with his first hit on the label in 1956. Atkins helped Locklin create a new musical style, backed by lush instrumentation that helped cement him with the Nashville Sound sub-genre of country music. Among these Nashville Sound hits was 1957's "Geisha Girl." The song became the inspiration for Locklin's debut studio album. Its chosen title was Foreign Love and would be a concept record, the first of many concept LP's Locklin would record at RCA. The project was recorded mostly in December 1957 at the RCA Studio, located in Nashville, Tennessee. Not only produced by Chet Atkins, many of the record's guitar work was also done by Atkins.

Foreign Love was described in the liner notes as a project that "captures all the excitement and wonder of a young American far away from home." Its theme was meant to be marketed towards American servicemen overseas. The album contained a total of 12 tracks, all of which had a similar "foreign" concept. It included the uptempo songs "Blue Grass Skirt" and the "Foreign Love Affair." The seventh track, "Geisha Girl," was Locklin's major hit from the previous year. Many of the album's tracks featured songs about love affairs with women from different countries. Examples of this included "Filipino Baby," "Mexicali Rose," and "My Wild Irish Rose." The latter tune was written by Cindy Walker.

== Release and reception ==
Professional ratings
Review scores
Source	Rating
Allmusic	3/5 stars

The album was inspired by the track, "Geisha Girl," which was the hit single off the album. The song was released as a single in July 1957. Later that year, "Geisha Girl" became a top five hit, peaking at number four on the Billboard Hot Country and Western Sides chart. It was Locklin's second major country hit for RCA. It was also his first single to reach a peak position on the Billboard Hot 100, climbing to number 66 in 1957. Foreign Love was then released in January 1958, shortly after the single's success. It was offered as a vinyl LP, containing six songs on each side of the record. In later years, Foreign Love received positive reception from Allmusic. Reviewer Greg Adams gave the album three out of five stars. Adams found that Locklin's tenor voice was "ideally suited" to the mid-tempo tracks that were part of the record. "It's a winner almost all the way around," he wrote.

== Track listing ==
Side one
No.	Title	Writer(s)	Length
1.	"Fraulein"	Lawton Williams
2.	"Lili Marlene"	Mack David; Hans Leip; Norbert Schultze
3.	"Foreign Love"	Williams
4.	"My Wild Irish Rose"	Chauncey Scott
5.	"Anna Marie"	Cindy Walker
6.	"Mademoiselle"	Ted Edlin

Side two
No.	Title	Writer(s)	Length
1.	"Geisha Girl"	Williams
2.	"Blue Hawaii"	Ralph Rainger; Leo Robin
3.	"Bluegrass Skirt"	Williams
4.	"Filipino Baby"	Bill Cox; Clark Van Ness
5.	"Foreign Love Affair"	Wayne Walker
6.	"Mexicali Rose"	Helen Stone; Jack Tenney

== Personnel ==
All credits are adapted from the liner notes of Foreign Love.

Musical personnel

- Chet Atkins – guitar
- Floyd Cramer – piano
- Ray Edenton – guitar
- Buddy Harman – drums
- Hank Locklin – lead vocals
- Grady Martin – guitar

Technical personnel

- Chet Atkins – producer

== Release history ==
Region	Date	Format	Label	Ref.
Canada	January 1958	Vinyl	RCA Victor	
United States	January 1958	Vinyl	RCA Victor	
