= Danny Davis and the Nashville Brass =

American country music band

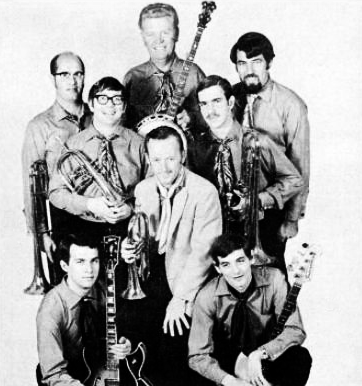
- Danny Davis (center) and the Nashville Brass in 1970

Background information
- Born: George Joseph Nowlan; May 29, 1925; Dorchester, Massachusetts, U.S.
- Died: June 12, 2008 (aged 83) Nashville, Tennessee, U.S.
- Genres: Country, Big Band
- Past members: Floyd Cramer; Danny Davis; Buddy Harmon; John Hartford; Grady Martin; Bob Moore; Bobby Thompson

Danny Davis and the Nashville Brass was an American country music band. They were founded by bandleader Danny Davis (May 29, 1925 – June 12, 2008) a trumpeter, vocalist, and producer. The Nashville Brass were founded in 1968 and recorded a variety of projects between then and the 1980s, including collaborations with Willie Nelson and Hank Locklin. Other members of the band included Floyd Cramer, Buddy Harmon, John Hartford, Grady Martin, Bob Moore, and Bobby Thompson.

== Early life and career ==
Danny Davis was born as George Joseph Nowlan into a large Irish-Catholic family in Dorchester, Massachusetts, United States, (one of his brothers became a priest who at one time was assigned to the Vatican). When he became a professional musician, he changed his name to Danny Davis because MGM executive Harry Meseron told him that "he looked like a Danny." He took the last name Davis because it was a common name in the South.

Davis's father died when he was five years old. His mother supported the family by giving music lessons (piano and voice) in the family home.

Davis began playing trumpet at an early age under the guidance of a man named Joseph Donovan. By age 14 he was trumpet soloist with the Massachusetts All-State Symphony Orchestra and was granted admittance to the New England Conservatory of Music. In 1940, he decided to leave the conservatory after only six weeks, when he was offered a job as a trumpeter with the band of the drummer, Gene Krupa.

During the remainder of the 1940s and into the 1950s, Davis continued working as a trumpeter/vocalist in several big bands, including those of Bobby Byrne, Sammy Kaye, Art Mooney (he played First Trumpet on Mooney's "I'm Looking Over a Four Leaf Clover"), Vincent Lopez and Freddy Martin. In Martin's band, in addition to his duties on trumpet, Davis sang as one of the "Martin Men" and roomed on the road with the band's male vocalist, Merv Griffin.

== The MGM days ==
During the early 1950s, Davis found some moderate success as a vocalist, releasing several singles including "Object of My Affection" and "Crazy Heart." The late 1950s was a transitional period in Davis's career. He found himself in New York City working as a producer for the MGM label. He also made an important contact in Nashville with Fred Rose. Davis cut pop demos of country songs for Rose. His demo of "Cold, Cold Heart" led to the pop recording by Tony Bennett.

In the early 1960s, Davis assembled a session group called Danny Davis & the Titans around guitarist Billy Mure. In 1961, the group released an instrumental album entitled, Today's Teen Beat (MGM SE 3992). A few months later, the group followed it up with an album designed to capitalize on the "Twist" craze, with another instrumental album entitled, Let's Do the Twist for Adults (MGM SE 3997). Six of the Titan songs on the second album received a great deal of exposure in 1964, when MGM used them to pad-out a collection of nascent Beatles tracks on an album called, The Beatles with Tony Sheridan & Guests (MGM SE 4215).

While at MGM Davis was assigned to produce one of the label's most successful artists, Connie Francis. This collaboration lead to several number 1 hits for Francis. In the early 1960s, Davis began taking Francis to Nashville where he recorded pop versions of country songs with her. It was during this time that his idea to record country songs with brass instruments was born. Also during his time at MGM Davis was responsible for bringing Herman's Hermits (featuring Peter Noone) to the label.

During his stint at MGM, Davis recorded several albums with an orchestra composed of some of the best studio musicians working in New York at the time. Most notable among these is an album entitled Brass on the Rebound. This album was recorded in 1963 and featured only one woodwind player in the orchestra. In his career as a record producer Davis worked with a wide variety of artists, from Nina Simone to Frank Yankovic. During his days in New York, he was also involved in early testing for broadcasting television programs in color.

== Move to RCA Victor ==
In the mid-1960s, Davis signed with RCA Victor. While still in New York he pitched his idea of recording country songs with a brass ensemble. Not long after he joined RCA Victor, Davis was approved for transfer to the Nashville office by Chet Atkins.

In Nashville, Atkins assigned Davis to produce sessions for Waylon Jennings. Even though it was a recording produced by Davis that earned Jennings his first Grammy Award ("MacArthur Park" with The Kimberlys), the two men did not have a good working relationship. It is reported that on one occasion Jennings pulled a gun on Davis during a recording session, but Davis denies the incident ever took place. Davis also worked with other RCA artists including Dottie West, Floyd Cramer and Hank Locklin.

== Launching the Nashville Brass ==
One evening Davis was in the presence of his employer, Chet Atkins, and Davis told Atkins of his idea of recording country songs with brass instruments. Davis set out to work on a demo. He chose Nashville arranger and fellow trumpeter, Bill McElhiney, to help create the sound of the Nashville Brass. The basic idea was to replace the vocalist with a brass ensemble (two to three trumpets, two trombones) playing over a standard country rhythm section (guitar, bass, drums, banjo).

For his recordings, Davis assembled a rhythm section from Nashville's A-Team of session musicians: Grady Martin (guitar), Floyd Cramer (piano), Bob Moore (bass), Buddy Harmon (drums), Bobby Thompson (banjo), John Hartford (banjo). When completed, Atkins hand carried the demo (Hank Williams' "I Saw The Light") to a meeting of RCA executives in California. In October 1968 the first album The Nashville Brass Play The Nashville Sound was released. The first album was followed by The Nashville Brass featuring Danny Davis Play More Nashville Sounds in 1969. Neither sold well.

== Acceptance and success ==
In 1970, the second album received the Grammy Award for Best Country Instrumental Performance. Beginning in 1969 and continuing for the next five years Danny Davis and the Nashville Brass dominated the Country Music Association Awards Best Instrumental Group category. Over the years the group garnered eleven more Grammy nominations and received many other awards from recording industry publications and associations.

Also in 1970 Davis changed his relationship with RCA, in that he ceased to produce other artists so he could concentrate all his energies on the Nashville Brass.

Danny Davis and the Nashville Brass took country music around the world, being one of the first acts in the genre to have their own airplane (originally a DC-3 later a Martin 404, named "Lady Barbara" for Davis's wife). They were also one of the first country acts to take the music to the Vegas strip, working first as an opening act for Connie Francis and later Kay Starr, they soon returned to headline. The group also guest starred on many of the biggest television shows of the day including Red Skelton, Ed Sullivan (including its last show) and the show of his old friend, Merv Griffin.

In the 1980s, Davis joined the cast of Hee Haw as a member of the "Million Dollar Band" with fellow instrumentalists Floyd Cramer, Chet Atkins, Boots Randolph, Roy Clark (guitar), Charlie McCoy (harmonica), Johnny Gimble (fiddle) and Kenneth C. "Jethro" Burns (mandolin). Davis and his group maintained a heavy touring schedule well into the 1990s. In the mid-1990s, Davis partnered with his old friend, Boots Randolph, opening the Stardust Theater in Nashville (near the Opryland Hotel). The two performed shows nightly for a couple of years. For the majority of his touring years, Davis retained on salary a fairly consistent personnel line-up. Among those musicians were: Bill Pippin (trumpet/flugelhorn/flute); Ray Carroll (trumpet/flugelhorn); Rex Peer (trombone); Phil Jones (bass trombone—Jones replaced the band's original bass trombonist, Frank Smith, after Smith's death in a car accident); Larry Morton (guitar); Chuck Sanders (bass); Terry Waddell (drums); Curtis McPeake (banjo). Davis and his group performed the English version of the theme song for the Japanese animated series Speed Racer.

Danny Davis's last chart appearance came in 1987 with the single "Green Eyes (Cryin' Those Blue Tears)" with featured vocalist Dona Mason. This song was the last appearance by a Black woman on the country music charts until Rissi Palmer's "Country Girl" twenty years later.

== Farewell to public performing ==
Danny Davis and the Nashville Brass gave their final public performance on July 23, 2005, at the Colonnade in Ringgold, Georgia. Davis was eighty years old at the time.

== Later years ==
After Davis retired from performing, he and his wife of fifty-seven years, Barbara continued to make Nashville their home. The couple has four children: Kerry, Kim, Gavin and Tara. Danny and former Nashville Brass trumpeter, Ray Carroll, began a mail-order business selling Nashville Brass recordings on the internet. Also, at the time of his death Davis and writer Thom King had nearly completed an autobiography tentatively titled Guess Who I Met Today.

== Death ==
Davis suffered a heart attack at his home in Nashville, Tennessee, on June 7, 2008. He died on June 12, 2008, at the age of 83.

== Discography ==
=== Albums ===
Year	Album	Chart Positions			Label
Year	Album	US Country	US BB	US CB	Label
1968	The Nashville Brass Play The Nashville Sound	33	78	89	RCA
1969	The Nashville Brass featuring Danny Davis Play More Nashville Sounds	6	143	—	RCA
1969	Movin On	16	141	—	RCA
1970	You Ain't Heard Nothin' Yet	9	102	—	RCA
1970	Christmas with Danny Davis and the Nashville Brass	—	11	—	RCA
1970	Down Homers	11	140	—	RCA
1970	Hank Locklin & Danny Davis and the Nashville Brass	—	—	—	RCA
1971	Somethin' Else	12	161	—	RCA
1971	Super Country	25	184	—	RCA
1972	Nashville Brass Turns to Gold	25	202	—	RCA
1972	Live in Person	35	—	—	RCA
1972	Turn on Some Happy	34	193	—	RCA
1973	Travelin'	—	—	—	RCA
1973	Caribbean Cruise	44	—	—	RCA
1974	The Best of Danny Davis and the Nashville Brass	22	—	—	RCA
1974	Danny Davis' Nashville Brass Bluegrass Country	23	—	—	RCA
1974	Latest and Greatest	34	—	—	RCA
1975	Dream Country	41	—	—	RCA
1975	Country Gold	35	—	—	RCA
1976	Texas	43	—	—	RCA
1976	Supersongs	46	—	—	RCA
1976	America 200 Years Young	—	—	—	RCA
1977	Chet Floyd & Danny	46	—	—	RCA
1977	Live! In Vegas	—	—	—	RCA
1978	How I Love Them Ol' Songs	—	—	—	RCA
1978	Cookin' Country	—	—	—	RCA
1979	Great Songs of the Big Band Era	—	—	—	RCA
1980	Danny Davis & Willie Nelson with the Nashville Brass	14	150	—	RCA
1981	Cotton Eyed Joe	—	—	—	RCA

=== Singles ===
Year	Single	Chart Positions			Album
Year	Single	US Country	US	CAN Country	Album
1969	"I Saw the Light"	—	129	—	The Nashville Brass Play the Nashville Sound
1970	"Please Help Me, I'm Falling" (with Hank Locklin)	68	—	—	Hank Locklin & Danny Davis and the Nashville Brass
1970	"Wabash Cannon Ball"	63	131	3	Movin' On
1970	"Flying South" (with Hank Locklin)	56	—	—	Hank Locklin & Danny Davis and the Nashville Brass
1970	"Columbus Stockade Blues"	70	—	—	You Ain't Heard Nothin' Yet
1977	"How I Love Them Old Songs"	91	—	—	How I Love Them Old Songs
1980	"Night Life" (with Willie Nelson)	20	—	9	Danny Davis & Willie Nelson with the Nashville Brass
1980	"Funny How Time Slips Away" (with Willie Nelson)	41	—	—	Danny Davis & Willie Nelson with the Nashville Brass
1981	"Colinda"	—	—	59	Cotton Eyed Joe
1985	"I Dropped Your Name"	82	—	—	singles only
1987	"Green Eyes (Cryin' Those Blue Tears)" (with Dona Mason)	62	—	—	singles only
