= Geisha Girl (song) =

Single by Hank Locklin

from the album Foreign Love
- B-side: "Livin' Alone"
- Released: July 1957
- Studio: RCA Victor Studio
- Genre: Country
- Label: RCA Victor
- Songwriter(s): Lawton Williams
- Producer(s): Chet Atkins

"Geisha Girl" is a song written by Lawton Williams, sung by Hank Locklin, and released on the RCA Victor label (catalog no. 20-6984). In August 1957, it peaked at No. 4 on Billboard's country and western best seller's chart. It spent 39 weeks on the charts and was also ranked No. 19 on Billboard's 1957 year-end country and western retail best seller chart.

== Charts ==
=== Weekly charts ===
Chart (1957)	Peak position
Billboard Hot 100 (Billboard)	66
Hot Country & Western Sides (Billboard)	4

== See also ==
- "Lost to a Geisha Girl"
- Billboard Top Country & Western Records of 1957
