= Send Me the Pillow You Dream On =

Song by Hank Locklin, The Browns, Johnny Tillotson and Dean Martin
- Published: 1949
- Songwriter: Hank Locklin

"Send Me the Pillow You Dream On" is a country song written and recorded by Hank Locklin. The song has become a standard for the Nashville sound, and has been covered by pop, country, and bluegrass artists.

Locklin first released the song in 78-disc 4 Star Records 1360 in September 1949, but it did not hit the charts. Locklin re-released it in December 1957 on RCA Victor 47-7127 single, and it peaked at No. 5 on Billboard's chart of "Most Played C&W by Jockeys" and crossed over to the pop charts. There is some ambiguity about the song's title: the original 1949 version and occasional later ones render it as "Send Me the Pillow That You Dream On", the phrase used consistently in the lyrics, but most versions use the shorter title.

== Cover versions ==
In the 1960s, the song was a hit for

- The Browns
- Johnny Tillotson
- Dean Martin

Among the many other artists who have recorded cover versions of the song are:

- Jerry Lee Lewis
- Connie Francis
- Hank Williams Jr.
- Daniel O'Donnell
- Dolly Parton
- The Everly Brothers
- Foster and Allen
- Hepie en Hepie
- Jerry Vale
- Loretta Lynn
- Marty Wilde
- Pat Boone
- Roy Rogers
- Slim Whitman
- Willie Nelson and Hank Snow
- Dwight Yoakam on his album Buenas Noches from a Lonely Room
- Skeeter Davis on her album Written by the Stars
- The Whites

== Chart performance ==
=== Hank Locklin ===
Chart (1958)	Peak position
US Billboard - C&W Best Sellers in Stores	7
US Billboard - Most Played C&W by Jockeys	5
US Billboard Top 100 Sides	77
Netherlands	4

=== Lydia and her Melody Strings ===
Chart (1959)	Peak position
Netherlands	4

=== The Browns ===
Chart (1960)	Peak position
US Billboard Hot C&W Sides	23
US Billboard Hot 100	56

=== Johnny Tillotson ===
Chart (1962)	Peak position
US Billboard Hot 100	17
US Billboard Hot C & W Sides	11
US Billboard Easy Listening	5
Norway VG-lista	3
U.K. - Record Retailer	21
Irish Singles Chart	7
Sweden Kvällstoppen Charts	17
Canada CHUM Chart	37

=== Dean Martin ===
Chart (1965)	Peak position
US Billboard Hot 100	22
US Billboard Middle-Road Singles	5
Canada RPM Top 40 & 5	16

=== The Whites ===
Chart (1981)	Peak position
US Billboard Hot Country Singles	66
