= Please Help Me, I'm Falling =

- Italian release picture sleeve

Single by Hank Locklin

from the album Please Help Me, I'm Falling
- B-side: "My Old Home Town"
- Released: February 1960
- Recorded: January 5, 1960
- Genre: Country
- Length: 2:21
- Label: RCA Victor
- Songwriter(s): Don Robertson; Hal Blair
- Producer(s): Chet Atkins

Hank Locklin singles chronology
"Blues in Advance" (1959)	"Please Help Me, I'm Falling" (1960)	"One Step Ahead of My Past" (1961)

"Please Help Me, I'm Falling" is a 1960 song written by Don Robertson and Hal Blair and first recorded by Hank Locklin. The single was Locklin's most successful recording and was his second number one on the country charts. "Please Help Me, I'm Falling" spent 14 weeks at the top spot and spent nine months on the country chart and crossed over to the Hot 100 peaking at number eight.

== Chart performance ==
Chart (1960)	Peak position
US Hot Country Songs (Billboard)	1
US Billboard Hot 100	8
U.K. Singles Chart	9
Norway VG Lista	4

== Answer record ==
Later in 1960, Skeeter Davis had a hit with an answer record titled "(I Can't Help You) I'm Falling Too", which peaked at number two for three weeks on the Hot C&W Sides charts and number 39 on the Hot 100.

== Cover versions ==
- During the early 1960s, Broadway Record Label released a version of this song on an EP - 45 rpm that featured "Vocals and Orchestra by Popular Artists," none of which are listed anywhere on the record label.
- In October 1963, The Everly Brothers recorded the song as one of the tracks on their album The Everly Brothers Sing Great Country Hits, featuring their covers of classic country songs.
- In June 1965, Vic Damone recorded the song as one of the tracks on his album You Were Only Fooling.
- On August 1, 1967, Charley Pride covered the song. His version was not released as a single and remained unreleased until it was included on his 1997 album The Essential Charley Pride.
- In 1973, John Fogerty covered the song on his first solo album Blue Ridge Rangers.
- In 1978, Janie Fricke released a cover version of the song as "Please Help Me (I'm Fallin' in Love with You)" and took it to number 12 on the country charts. Unlike Locklin's piano-based, bright mid-tempo version, Fricke's version is a ballad in the country pop vein.
- In 1989, Kirsty MacColl covered the song as b-side to her single "Days".
- In 1993, Dolly Parton, Loretta Lynn and Tammy Wynette recorded their version of "Please Help Me (I'm Fallin' in Love with You)" for their album Honky Tonk Angels, and Loretta recorded a duet with Conway Twitty from the 1987 album Heartland Music.
- In 1996, Puff Johnson recorded a version of "Please Help Me (I'm Fallin' in Love with You)" for her album Miracle.
- Gladys Knight covered the song on her 2001 album At Last.
- In 2007, David Ball covered the song on his album Heartaches by the Number.
- In 2008, Patty Loveless covered the song on her album Sleepless Nights.
