= 1968 in country music =

This is a list of notable events in country music that took place in 1968.

== Events ==
- January 13 – Johnny Cash records his legendary concert at Folsom State Prison. The resulting album, At Folsom Prison, becomes a huge international success and a cornerstone of his music catalog; the lead single, "Folsom Prison Blues" (an update of his 1956 hit) becomes one of the most famous recordings of his career.
- February 1 – Elvis Presley's only child, Lisa Marie, is born in Memphis, Tennessee.
- March 1 – Johnny Cash and June Carter are married.
- November – The Country Music Association Awards are aired on television for the first time. Hosted by Roy Rogers and Dale Evans, the awards show is taped in October and aired on NBC a month later.
- December 3 – Elvis Presley's '68 Comeback Special airs on NBC. Although this special focuses more on the pop/rock side of his musical talents, the special will reinvigorate Presley's career in both the country and mainstream pop genres.

=== No dates ===
- The National Barn Dance – by now on WGN-AM – broadcasts its final show, after a run of 44 years.

== Top hits of the year ==
=== Number one hits ===
==== United States ====
(as certified by Billboard)

Date	Single Name	Artist	Wks. No.1	CAN peak	Spec. Note
January 20	Sing Me Back Home	Merle Haggard	2	7
February 3	Skip a Rope	Henson Cargill	5		^{[C]}
March 9	Take Me to Your World	Tammy Wynette	1
March 16	A World of Our Own	Sonny James	3
April 6	How Long Will My Baby Be Gone	Buck Owens	1	16
April 13	You Are My Treasure	Jack Greene	1
April 20	Fist City	Loretta Lynn	1
April 27	The Legend of Bonnie and Clyde	Merle Haggard	2	3
May 11	Have a Little Faith	David Houston	1
May 18	I Wanna Live	Glen Campbell	3		^{[2], [A]}: Returned to Number One on June 15.
May 25	Honey	Bobby Goldsboro	3		^{[C]}: Also peaked at Number One on the Billboard Pop and Adult Contemporary charts.
June 29	D-I-V-O-R-C-E	Tammy Wynette	3
July 20	Folsom Prison Blues	Johnny Cash	4		^{[1]}: Originally the B-side single of "So Doggone Lonesome" in 1956, "Folsom Prison Blues" was re-released as a live cut, becoming the more-remembered version of the song.
August 17	Heaven Says Hello	Sonny James	1	26
August 24	Already It's Heaven	David Houston	1
August 31	Mama Tried	Merle Haggard	4
September 28	Harper Valley PTA	Jeannie C. Riley	3		^{[C]}: Also peaked at Number One on the Billboard Pop and Adult Contemporary charts.
October 19	Then You Can Tell Me Goodbye	Eddy Arnold	2		^{[B]}: Cover of The Casinos' 1967 doo-wop hit.
November 2	Next in Line	Conway Twitty	1	2	^{[A]}: Originally known as a Rock & Roll singer in the early 1960s, Conway Twitty crossed over into country music in the mid-1960s, with this song becoming the first of 45 Number One hits of his career.
November 9	I Walk Alone	Marty Robbins	2	3
November 23	Stand by Your Man	Tammy Wynette	3		Released during the height of the women's rights movement, "Stand by Your Man" was often derided by many feminist supporters.
December 14	Born to Be with You	Sonny James	1	9
December 21	Wichita Lineman	Glen Campbell	2		Also reached Number Three on the Billboard Hot 100 chart and Number One on the Hot Adult Contemporary Tracks chart.

Notes

- 1 No. 1 song of the year, as determined by Billboard.
- 2 Song dropped from No. 1 and later returned to top spot.
- A First Billboard No. 1 hit for that artist.
- B Last Billboard No. 1 hit for that artist.
- C Only Billboard No. 1 hit for that artist to date.

==== Canada ====
(as certified by RPM)

Date	Single Name	Artist	Wks. No.1	U.S. peak	Spec. Note
January 13	Tell Me Not to Go	Myrna Lorrie	2	—
January 27	By the Time I Get to Phoenix	Glen Campbell	3	2	^{[A]}
February 17	Here Comes Heaven	Eddy Arnold	1	2	^{[A]}
February 24	I Heard from a Heart Break Last Night	Jim Reeves	1	9
March 2	Skip a Rope	Henson Cargill	2		^{[C]}
March 16	Take Me to Your World	Tammy Wynette	1		^{[A]}
March 23	Rosanna's Going Wild	Johnny Cash	3	2	^{[A]}
April 13	A World of Our Own	Sonny James	1		^{[A]}
April 20	Turn Down the Music	Myrna Lorrie	2	—	^{[B]}
May 4	You Are My Treasure	Jack Greene	1		^{[C]}
May 11	Fist City	Loretta Lynn	1		^{[A]}
May 18	Have a Little Faith	David Houston	1
May 25	Wild Week-End	Bill Anderson	1	2	^{[A]}
June 1	Honey	Bobby Goldsboro	2		^{[A]}
June 15	I Wanna Live	Glen Campbell	2
June 29	D-I-V-O-R-C-E	Tammy Wynette	3
July 20	Folsom Prison Blues	Johnny Cash	2		RPM didn't publish on July 27 or August 12.
August 19	What's Made Milwaukee Famous (Has Made a Loser Out of Me)	Jerry Lee Lewis	1	2	^{[A]}
August 26	Already It's Heaven	David Houston	1
September 2	Dreams of the Everyday Housewife	Glen Campbell	2	3
September 16	Harper Valley PTA	Jeannie C. Riley	2		^{[A]}
September 30	Only Daddy That'll Walk the Line	Waylon Jennings	1	2	^{[A]}
October 7	Applesauce	Lynn Jones	2	—	^{[B]}
October 21	Big Girls Don't Cry	Lynn Anderson	1	12	^{[A]}
October 28	I Just Came to Get My Baby	Faron Young	1	8	^{[A]}
November 4	Happy State of Mind	Bill Anderson	1	2
November 11	Then You Can Tell Me Goodbye	Eddy Arnold	1		^{[B]}
November 18	When You Are Gone	Jim Reeves	1	7
November 25	Mama Tried	Merle Haggard	1		^{[A]}
December 2	Where Love Used to Live	David Houston	1	2
December 9	Stand by Your Man	Tammy Wynette	1
December 16	Little Arrows	Leapy Lee	1	11	^{[C]}
December 23	I Take a Lot of Pride in What I Am	Merle Haggard	3	3	^{[2]}: Fell to #2 on the week of January 13, 1969.

Notes

- 2 Song dropped from No. 1 and later returned to top spot.
- A First RPM No. 1 hit for that artist.
- C Only RPM No. 1 hit for that artist.

=== Other major hits ===
==== Singles released by American artists ====
US	CAN	Single	Artist
20	24	Age of Worry	Billy Walker
19	6	Ain't Got Time to Be Unhappy	Bob Luman
16	13	Angry Words	Stonewall Jackson
4	—	Another Place, Another Time	Jerry Lee Lewis
12	20	Anything Leaving Town Today	Dave Dudley
3	6	As Long as I Live	George Jones
15	2	Autumn of My Life	Bobby Goldsboro
7	7	Baby's Back Again	Connie Smith
14	7	Ballad of Two Brothers	Autry Inman
16	—	Be Proud of Your Man	Porter Wagoner
11	—	Blue Lonely Winter	Jimmy C. Newman
21	8	Born a Fool	Freddie Hart
20	35	Born to Love You	Jimmy C. Newman
23	11	The Cajun Stripper	Jim Ed Brown
50	3	The Canadian Railroad Trilogy/It's My Time	George Hamilton IV
41	17	Christopher Robin	The Stonemans
16	6	Count Your Blessings, Woman	Jan Howard
15	5	Country Girl	Dottie West
8	—	The Country Hall of Fame	Hank Locklin
20	—	Cry, Cry, Cry	Connie Smith
4	5	The Day the World Stood Still	Charley Pride
45	15	Down in the Flood	Flatt & Scruggs
2	2	The Easy Part's Over	Charley Pride
13	11	The Enemy	Jim Ed Brown
15	5	Find Out What's Happening	Bobby Bare
8	—	Flower of Love	Leon Ashley
18	15	Foggy River	Carl Smith
72	18	For Loving You	Skeeter Davis & Don Bowman
10	10	From Heaven to Heartache	Bobby Lewis
30	20	Gentle on My Mind	Glen Campbell
52	17	Gypsy King	Kitty Wells
22	10	Happy Street	Slim Whitman
24	18	Harper Valley P.T.A. (Later That Same Day)	Ben Colder
18	—	Heaven Help the Working Girl	Norman Jean
4	—	Here Comes the Rain, Baby	Eddy Arnold
15	21	Hey Daddy	Charlie Louvin
13	2	Hey Little One	Glen Campbell
7	17	Holding on to Nothin'	Porter Wagoner and Dolly Parton
10	30	I Believe in Love	Bonnie Guitar
4	2	I Got You	Waylon Jennings and Anita Carter
14	6	I Keep Coming Back for More	Dave Dudley
26	13	I Promised You the World	Ferlin Husky
27	8	I Still Believe in Love	Jan Howard
11	—	I'd Give the World (To Be Back Loving You)	Warner Mack
10	—	I'll Love You More (Than You Need)	Jeannie Seely
38	11	I'm Coming Back Home to Stay	The Buckaroos
7	10	I'm Gonna Move On	Warner Mack
11	35	I've Been There Before	Ray Price
5	6	I've Got You on My Mind Again	Buck Owens
5	2	The Image of Me	Conway Twitty
16	14	In Love	Wynn Stewart
12	20	It's a Long, Long Way to Georgia	Don Gibson
11	—	It's All Over	David Houston and Tammy Wynette
3	3	It's All Over but the Crying	Hank Williams, Jr.
4	15	It's Over	Eddy Arnold
24	9	Jody and the Kid	Roy Drusky
17	8	Just Because I'm a Woman	Dolly Parton
4	—	Just for You	Ferlin Husky
17	—	The Last Goodbye	Dick Miles
7	4	The Last Thing on My Mind	Porter Wagoner and Dolly Parton
4	3	Let the Chips Fall	Charley Pride
7	36	Let the World Keep on A-Turnin'	Buck Owens and Buddy Alan
14	7	Little Bit Later on Down the Line	Bobby Bare
6	33	Little Green Apples	Roger Miller
22	8	Little Things	Willie Nelson
18	2	Little World Girl	George Hamilton IV
5	4	Looking at the World Through a Windshield	Del Reeves
10	11	Love Is in the Air	Marty Robbins
14	8	Love Me Love Me	Bobby Barnett
4	4	Love Takes Care of Me	Jack Greene
7	—	Love's Gonna Happen to Me	Wynn Stewart
24	7	Luzianna	Webb Pierce
14	4	Mental Journey	Leon Ashley
12	—	Milwaukee, Here I Come	George Jones and Brenda Carter
21	16	Mother, May I	Lynn Anderson and Liz Anderson
17	—	My Can Do Can't Keep Up with My Want To	Nat Stuckey
11	—	My Goal for Today	Kenny Price
8	19	No Another Time	Lynn Anderson
7	12	On Tap in the Can or in the Bottle	Hank Thompson
9	8	Plastic Saddle	Nat Stuckey
4	—	Promises, Promises	Lynn Anderson
45	18	Raggedy Ann	Charlie Rich
17	6	Rainbows Are Back in Style	Slim Whitman
8	14	Ramona	Billy Walker
14	16	Remembering	Jerry Reed
19	6	Reno	Dottie West
10	—	Repeat After Me	Jack Reno
11	3	Row Row Row	Henson Cargill
10	18	Run Away Little Tears	Connie Smith
8	—	Say It's Not You	George Jones
2	2	She Still Comes Around (To Love What's Left of Me)	Jerry Lee Lewis
6	7	She Wears My Ring	Ray Price
14	32	She Went a Little Bit Further	Faron Young
10	20	Something Pretty	Wynn Stewart
17	—	Something Special	Mel Tillis
—	4	Son of Hickory Holler's Tramp	O. C. Smith
41	17	The Sounds of Goodbye	Tommy Cash
13	—	Stop the Sun	Bonnie Guitar
37	7	The Straight Life	Bobby Goldsboro
18	—	Sundown Mary	Billy Walker
2	4	Sweet Rosie Jones	Buck Owens
31	11	Take Me Along with You	Van Trevor
8	3	Take Me As I Am (Or Let Me Go)	Ray Price
9	5	That's When I See the Blues (In Your Pretty Brown Eyes)	Jim Reeves
10	5	There Ain't No Easy Run	Dave Dudley
16	18	There's a Fool Born Every Minute	Skeeter Davis
21	14	A Thing Called Love	Jimmy Dean
24	13	Togetherness	Freddie Hart
16	21	Town That Broke My Heart	Bobby Bare
15	14	Tupelo Mississippi Flash	Jerry Reed
10	—	Undo the Right	Johnny Bush
5	5	Walk on Out of My Mind	Waylon Jennings
5	—	We'll Get Ahead Someday	Porter Wagoner and Dolly Parton
18	—	Weakness in a Man	Roy Drusky
25	18	White Fences and Evergreen Trees	Ferlin Husky
18	5	Wild Blood	Del Reeves
20	22	Will You Visit Me on Sundays?	Charlie Louvin
3	—	With Pen in Hand	Johnny Darrell
14	—	Wonderful World of Women	Faron Young
2	—	You've Just Stepped In (From Stepping Out on Me)	Loretta Lynn
3	17	Your Squaw Is on the Warpath	Loretta Lynn

==== Singles released by Canadian artists ====
US	CAN	Single	Artist
—	8	Blue Day	Bob King
—	3	Calgary	Gary Buck
—	4	Changing of the Seasons	Myrna Lorrie
—	12	Chaser for the Blues	Bernie Early
68	12	Come on Home	Debbie Lori Kaye
—	19	For Breaking Up My Heart	Wayne King
—	2	Gonna Put Some Lovin' On You	Lynn Jones
—	2	Half a World Away	Tommy Hunter
20	5	The Late and Great Love (Of My Heart)	Hank Snow
—	3	Ride Ride Ride	Debbie Lori Kaye
—	19	Such a Lovely Day	Jeanie Ward
50	14	The Sugar from My Candy	Ray Griff
—	16	Thunderation	Odie Workman
—	13	The Wife You Save May Be Your Own	Dianne Leigh

== Top new album releases ==
Album	Artist	Record Label
The Best of Bobby Bare Vol. 2	Bobby Bare	RCA
The Best of Wanda Jackson	Wanda Jackson	Capitol
Big Girls Don't Cry	Lynn Anderson	Chart
The Bottom of the Bottle	Porter Wagoner	RCA
Count Your Blessings, Woman	Jan Howard	Decca
Country Girl	Dottie West	RCA
Cream of the Crop	Wanda Jackson and The Party Timers	Capitol
Country Hall of Fame	Hank Locklin	RCA
D-I-V-O-R-C-E	Tammy Wynette	Epic
Glen Campbell and Bobbie Gentry	Glen Campbell and Bobbie Gentry	Capitol
Happy State of Mind	Bill Anderson	Decca
Harper Valley PTA	Jeannie C. Riley	Plantation
Honey	Bobby Goldsboro	United Artists
I'll Love You More	Jeannie Seely	Monument
Johnny Cash at Folsom Prison	Johnny Cash	Columbia
Just Because I'm a Woman	Dolly Parton	RCA
Liz Anderson Sings Her Favorites	Liz Anderson	RCA
Little Things	Jeannie Seely	Monument
The Many Moods of Wanda Jackson	Wanda Jackson	Capitol
My Love Song for You	Hank Locklin	RCA
Softly	Hank Locklin	RCA
Something Pretty	Wynn Stewart	Capitol
Walking in Love Land	Eddy Arnold	RCA
Wild Weekend	Bill Anderson	Decca

== Births ==
- January 27 — Tracy Lawrence, singer with a string of hits in the 1990s and 2000s (decade) ("Sticks and Stones", "Alibis", "Find Out Who Your Friends Are", and others)
- March 26 — Kenny Chesney, became one of the genre's leading superstars in the late 1990s onward.
- June 3 — Jamie O'Neal, Australian-born female vocalist of the 2000s (decade).
- June 5 – Brett James, singer-songwriter (d. 2025).
- August 5 — Terri Clark, Canadian-born female vocalist since the mid-1990s.
- November 10 — Chris Cagle, contemporary-styled singer of the 2000s (decade)
- December 22 - Lori McKenna, singer/songwriter whose songs have impacted the lives of millions around the world. McKenna penned such hits as "Girl Crush" by Little Big Town and "Humble & Kind" by Tim McGraw. McKenna first gained fame in 2004, while in 2005 Faith Hill used 3 of McKenna’s songs on her Fireflies album. McKenna is currently one of the most in-demand artists on Music Row.

== Deaths ==
- April 22 – Stephen H. Sholes, 57, music executive and record producer, most prominently with RCA Records (heart attack).
- May 8 – George D. Hay, 72, "The Solemn Old Judge", legendary announcer, first on WLS and later on WSM's Grand Ole Opry radio program.
- June 14 — Ernest "Pop" Stoneman, 75, country music pioneer and leader of the Stoneman Family.
- September 19 — Red Foley, 58, one of country music's top stars of the 1940s and 1950s (respiratory failure).

== Country Music Hall of Fame Inductees ==
- Bob Wills (1905–1975)

== Major awards ==
=== Grammy Awards ===
- Best Female Country Vocal Performance — "Harper Valley PTA", Jeannie C. Riley
- Best Male Country Vocal Performance — "Folsom Prison Blues", Johnny Cash
- Best Country Performance by a Duo or Group with Vocal — "Foggy Mountain Breakdown", Flatt & Scruggs
- Best Country Song — "Little Green Apples", Bobby Russell (Performer: Roger Miller)

=== Academy of Country Music ===
- Single of the Year — "Little Green Apples", Roger Miller
- Album of the Year — Bobbie Gentry & Glen Campbell, Bobbie Gentry and Glen Campbell
- Top Male Vocalist — Glen Campbell
- Top Female Vocalist — Cathie Taylor
- Top Vocal Duo — Johnny Mosby and Jonie Mosby
- Top New Male Vocalist — Ray Sanders
- Top New Female Vocalist — Cheryl Poole

=== Country Music Association ===
- Founding President's Award (formerly Connie B. Gay Award) — Owen Bradley
- Entertainer of the Year — Glen Campbell
- Song of the Year — "Honey", Bobby Russell (Performer: Bobby Goldsboro)
- Single of the Year — "Harper Valley PTA", Jeannie C. Riley
- Album of the Year — At Folsom Prison, Johnny Cash
- Male Vocalist of the Year — Glen Campbell
- Female Vocalist of the Year — Tammy Wynette
- Vocal Group of the Year — Porter Wagoner and Dolly Parton
- Instrumentalist of the Year — Chet Atkins
- Instrumental Group of the Year — The Buckaroos
- Comedian of the Year — Ben Colder

== Other links ==
- Country Music Association
- Inductees of the Country Music Hall of Fame
