= Billboard Top Country Singles of 1968 =

This is a list of Billboard magazine's ranking of the top country singles of 1968.

The ranking was based on performance on the Billboard Country Chart during the period from January 6, 1968, to August 31, 1968. Accordingly, the list excludes songs like (i) "Stand by Your Man", which was released in September 1968 and held the No. 1 spot for three consecutive weeks from November 23 to December 7, and (ii) "Mama Tried", which held the No. 1 spot for four consecutive weeks from August 31 to September 21.

Rank	Peak (Note: This column recites the record's peak position on Billboard's weekly charts.)	Title	Artist(s)	Label
1	1	"Skip a Rope"	Henson Cargill	Monument
2	1	"A World of Our Own"	Sonny James	Capitol
3	1	"D-I-V-O-R-C-E"	Tammy Wynette	Epic
4	1	"I Wanna Live"	Glen Campbell	Capitol
5	1	"Folsom Prison Blues"	Johnny Cash	Columbia
6	1	"Honey"	Bobby Goldsboro	United Artists
7	2	"Wild Week-End"	Bill Anderson	Decca
8	1	"Fist City"	Loretta Lynn	Decca
9	1	"The Legend of Bonnie and Clyde"	Merle Haggard	Capitol
10	5	"Image of Me"	Conway Twitty	Decca
11	1	"Take Me to Your World"	Tammy Wynette	Epic
12	3	"With Pen in Hand"	Johnny Darrell	United Artists
13	1	"Sing Me Back Home"	Merle Haggard	Capitol
14	4	"Another Time, Another Place"	Jerry Lee Lewis	Smash
15	4	"The Day the World Stood Still	Charley Pride	RCA
16	1	"How Long Will My Baby Be Gone"	Buck Owens	Capitol
17	1	"Heaven Says Hello"	Sonny James	Capitol
18	1	"Just for You"	Ferlin Husky	Capitol
19	7	"I'm Gonna Move On"	Warner Mack	Decca
20	1	"Have a Little Faith"	David Houston	Epic
21	1	"You Are My Treasure"	Jack Greene	Decca
22	2	"The Easy Part's Over"	Charley Pride	RCA Victor
23	5	"Walk on Out of My Mind"	Waylon Jennings	RCA Victor
24	2	"Sweet Rosie Jones"	Buck Owens	Capitol
25	10	"Run Away Little Tears"	Connie Smith	RCA Victor
26	10	"Love Is in the Air"	Marty Robbins	Columbia
27	4	"I Got You"	Waylon Jennings and Anita Carter	RCA Victor
28	14	"She Went a Little Bit Further"	Faron Young	Mercury
29	2	"Rosanna's Going Wild"	Johnny Cash	Columbia
30	7	"Holding on to Nothin'"	Porter Wagoner and Dolly Parton	RCA Victor
31	2	"What's Made Milwaukee Famous (Has Made a Loser Out of Me)"	Jerry Lee Lewis	Smash
32	4	"Here Comes the Rain, Baby"	Eddy Arnold	RCA Victor
33	11	"I've Been There Before"	Ray Price	Columbia
34	4	"Promises, Promises"	Lynn Anderson	Chart
35	8	"Take Me As I Am (Or Let Me Go)"	Ray Price	Columbia
36	1	"For Loving You"	Bill Anderson and Jan Howard	Decca
37	1	"Already It's Heaven"	David Houston	Epic
38	6	"Little Green Apples"	Roger Miller	Smash
39	14	"Remembering"	Jerry Reed	RCA Victor
40	11	"It's All Over"	David Houston and Tammy Wynette	Epic
41	10	"Repeat After Me"	Jack Reno	Jab
42	8	"Say It's Not You"	George Jones	Musicor
43	2	"You've Just Stepped In (From Stepping Out on Me)"	Loretta Lynn	Decca
44	13	"Stop the Sun"	Bonnie Guitar	Dot
45	7	"The Last Thing on My Mind"	Porter Wagoner and Dolly Parton	RCA Victor
46	7	"Baby's Back Again"	Connie Smith	RCA Victor
47	10	"There Ain't No Easy Run"	Dave Dudley	Mercury
48	4	"It's Over"	Eddy Arnold	RCA Victor
49	9	"That's When I See the Blues (In Your Pretty Brown Eyes)"	Jim Reeves	RCA Victor
50	10	"I Believe in Love"	Bonnie Guitar	Dot
68	15	"Country Girl"	Dottie West	RCA Victor

== See also ==
- List of Hot Country Singles number ones of 1968
- List of Billboard Hot 100 number ones of 1968
- 1968 in country music
