= List of Hot Country Singles number ones of 1968 =

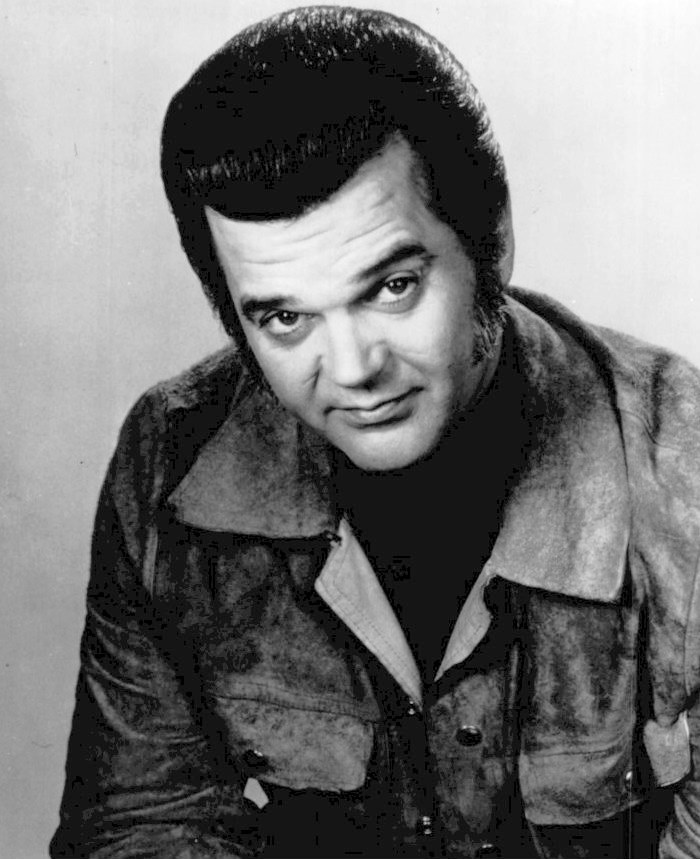
Conway Twitty reached number one for the first time in 1968. He would go on to achieve a record-breaking 40 chart-toppers.

Hot Country Songs is a chart that ranks the top-performing country music songs in the United States, published by Billboard magazine. In 1968, 24 different singles topped the chart, then published under the title Hot Country Singles, in 52 issues of the magazine, based on playlists submitted by country music radio stations and sales reports submitted by stores.

At the start of the year the number-one single was "For Loving You" by Bill Anderson and Jan Howard, its third week in the top spot. It remained at number one until the issue dated January 20, when it was replaced by Merle Haggard's single "Sing Me Back Home". Haggard spent the highest number of weeks at number one in 1968, topping the chart for a total of eight weeks with "Sing Me Back Home", "The Legend of Bonnie and Clyde" and "Mama Tried". He was one of three artists to take three different singles to number one during the year, the most by any act. Sonny James reached number one with "A World of Our Own", "Heaven Says Hello" and "Born To Be With You", and Tammy Wynette topped the chart with "Take Me to Your World", "D-I-V-O-R-C-E" and "Stand by Your Man". The longest run at number one by a single was the five weeks which Henson Cargill spent in the top spot with "Skip a Rope" in February and March. Two of 1968's country number ones also topped Billboard's all-genre singles chart, the Hot 100. Bobby Goldsboro's single "Honey" had already had a run atop the Hot 100 when it reached number one on the country chart in May. Jeannie C. Riley's "Harper Valley PTA" topped the Hot 100 in September and reached the peak position on the country chart the following week. Although it did not achieve the same level of crossover success, Wynette's November chart-topper "Stand by Your Man" has come to be regarded as one of the greatest country songs of all time. In 2003 it topped a poll of critics, journalists and industry insiders to find the top song of the genre, and in 2010 the song was added by the Library of Congress to the National Recording Registry, which selects recordings annually that are "culturally, historically, or aesthetically significant".

In the issue of Billboard dated October 19, Eddy Arnold, one of the most successful country singers of the preceding 20 years, achieved his final number one with "Then You Can Tell Me Goodbye". The single was his 28th number one on Billboard's country charts (including Hot Country Singles and its predecessor charts), a record at the time. Two weeks later Arnold was replaced in the top spot when Conway Twitty reached number one for the first time with his single "Next in Line". A former rock and roll singer who had turned to country music in the mid-1960s, Twitty would remain a fixture at the top of the country charts for two decades, and set a new record for the most country chart-toppers when he achieved his 29th number one in 1980. Twitty would ultimately take 40 singles to the top of the chart from 1968 to 1986, a record which would stand until 2006, when George Strait topped the chart for the 41st time. In addition to Twitty, four other acts reached number one on the Hot Country chart for the first time in 1968: Henson Cargill, Jeannie C. Riley, Bobby Goldsboro and Glen Campbell. Of these four acts, only Campbell would go on to top the chart again, and he did so before the end of 1968, when his single "Wichita Lineman" was the final number one of the year.

== Chart history ==
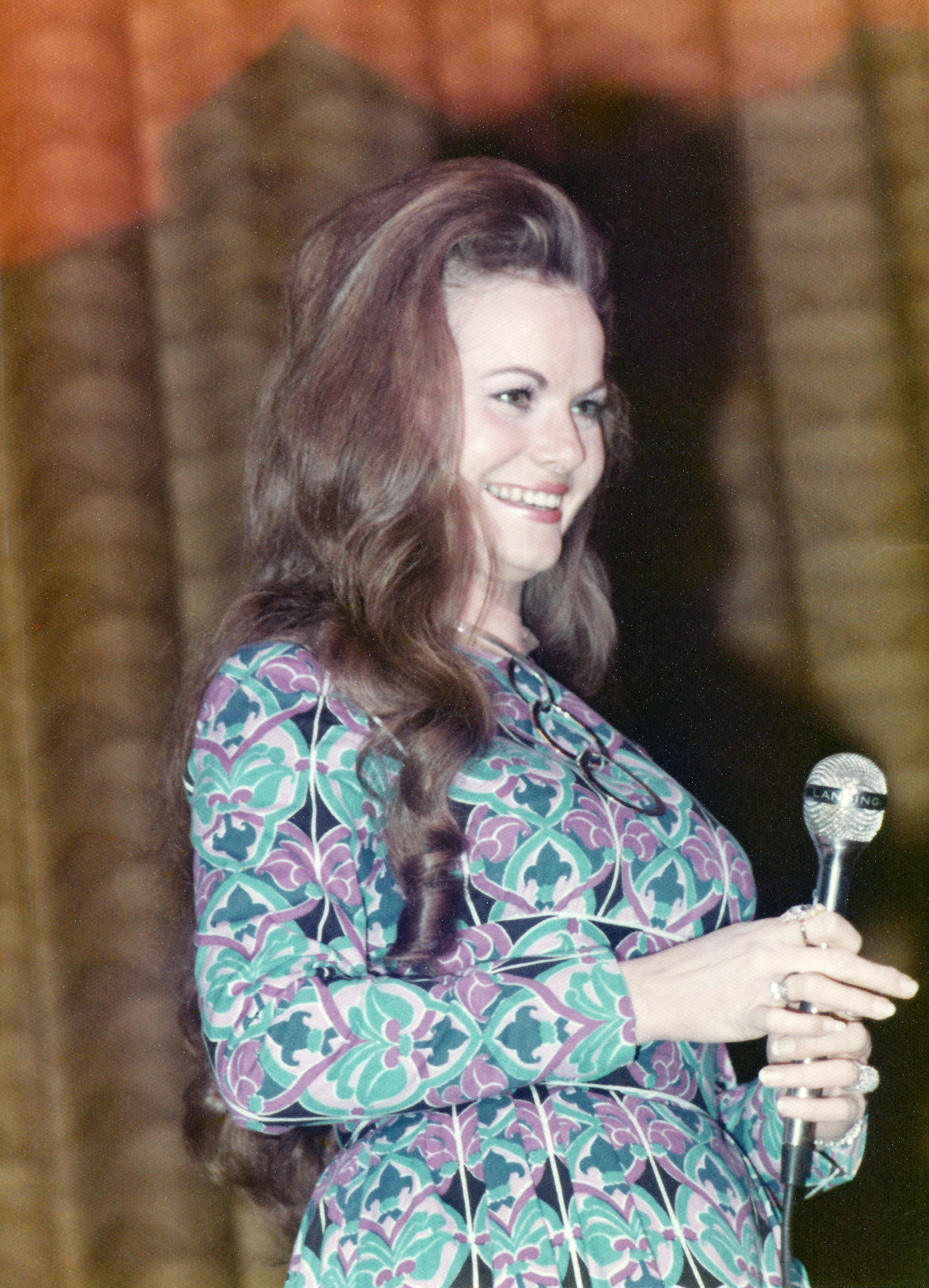
Jeannie C. Riley's "Harper Valley PTA" also topped the Billboard Hot 100 and went on to inspire a film and a TV show.

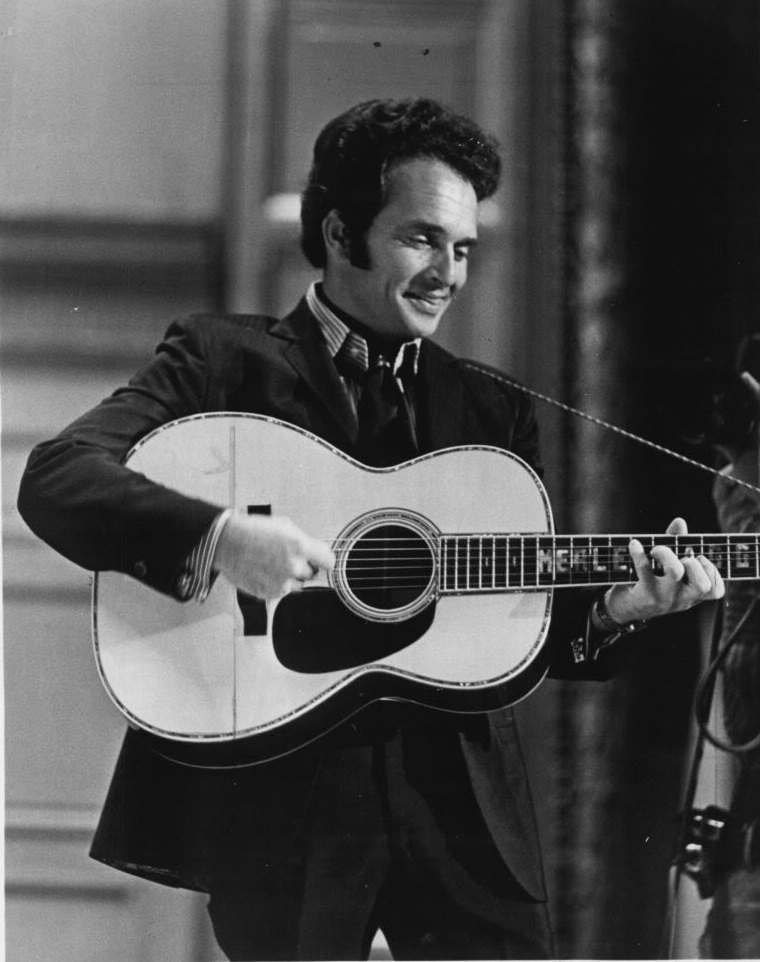
Merle Haggard had three number ones in 1968.

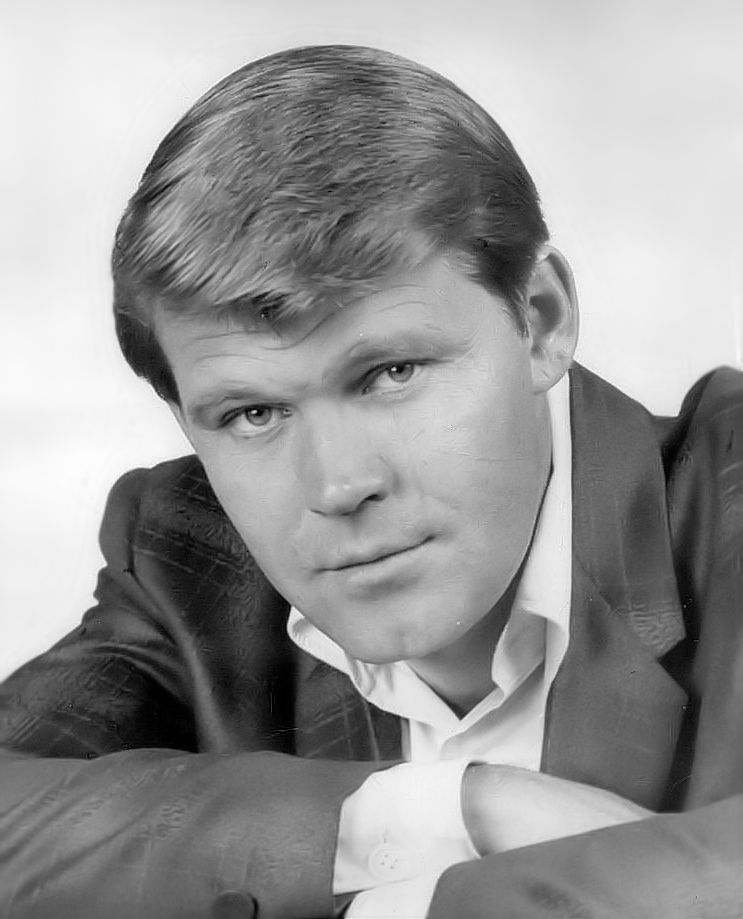
Glen Campbell achieved his first number one in 1968 with "I Wanna Live".

Hot Country Singles number ones of 1968
Issue date	Title	Artist(s)	Ref.
January 6	"For Loving You"	Bill Anderson and Jan Howard	
January 13	"For Loving You"	Bill Anderson and Jan Howard	
January 20	"Sing Me Back Home"	Merle Haggard	
January 27	"Sing Me Back Home"	Merle Haggard	
February 3	"Skip a Rope"	Henson Cargill	
February 10	"Skip a Rope"	Henson Cargill	
February 17	"Skip a Rope"	Henson Cargill	
February 24	"Skip a Rope"	Henson Cargill	
March 2	"Skip a Rope"	Henson Cargill	
March 9	"Take Me to Your World"	Tammy Wynette	
March 16	"A World of Our Own"	Sonny James	
March 23	"A World of Our Own"	Sonny James	
March 30	"A World of Our Own"	Sonny James	
April 6	"How Long Will My Baby Be Gone"	Buck Owens and his Buckaroos	
April 13	"You Are My Treasure"	Jack Greene	
April 20	"Fist City"	Loretta Lynn	
April 27	"The Legend of Bonnie and Clyde"	Merle Haggard	
May 4	"The Legend of Bonnie and Clyde"	Merle Haggard	
May 11	"Have A Little Faith"	David Houston	
May 18	"I Wanna Live"	Glen Campbell	
May 25	"Honey"	Bobby Goldsboro	
June 1	"Honey"	Bobby Goldsboro	
June 8	"Honey"	Bobby Goldsboro	
June 15	"I Wanna Live"	Glen Campbell	
June 22	"I Wanna Live"	Glen Campbell	
June 29	"D-I-V-O-R-C-E"	Tammy Wynette	
July 6	"D-I-V-O-R-C-E"	Tammy Wynette	
July 13	"D-I-V-O-R-C-E"	Tammy Wynette	
July 20	"Folsom Prison Blues"	Johnny Cash	
July 27	"Folsom Prison Blues"	Johnny Cash	
August 3	"Folsom Prison Blues"	Johnny Cash	
August 10	"Folsom Prison Blues"	Johnny Cash	
August 17	"Heaven Says Hello"	Sonny James	
August 24	"Already It's Heaven"	David Houston	
August 31	"Mama Tried"	Merle Haggard	
September 7	"Mama Tried"	Merle Haggard	
September 14	"Mama Tried"	Merle Haggard	
September 21	"Mama Tried"	Merle Haggard	
September 28	"Harper Valley PTA"	Jeannie C. Riley	
October 5	"Harper Valley PTA"	Jeannie C. Riley	
October 12	"Harper Valley PTA"	Jeannie C. Riley	
October 19	"Then You Can Tell Me Goodbye"	Eddy Arnold	
October 26	"Then You Can Tell Me Goodbye"	Eddy Arnold	
November 2	"Next In Line"	Conway Twitty	
November 9	"I Walk Alone"	Marty Robbins	
November 16	"I Walk Alone"	Marty Robbins	
November 23	"Stand By Your Man"	Tammy Wynette	
November 30	"Stand By Your Man"	Tammy Wynette	
December 7	"Stand By Your Man"	Tammy Wynette	
December 14	"Born To Be With You"	Sonny James	
December 21	"Wichita Lineman"	Glen Campbell	
December 28	"Wichita Lineman"	Glen Campbell	

== See also ==
- 1968 in music
- 1968 in country music
- List of artists who reached number one on the U.S. country chart
