= List of RPM number-one country singles of 1968 =

These are the Canadian number-one country songs of 1968, per the RPM Country Tracks chart.

Issue date	Title	Artist
January 6	It Takes People Like You (To Make People Like Me)	Buck Owens
January 13	Tell Me Not to Go	Myrna Lorrie
January 20	Tell Me Not to Go	Myrna Lorrie
January 27	By the Time I Get to Phoenix	Glen Campbell
February 3	By the Time I Get to Phoenix	Glen Campbell
February 10	By the Time I Get to Phoenix	Glen Campbell
February 17	Here Comes Heaven	Eddy Arnold
February 24	I Heard from a Heartbreak	Jim Reeves
March 2	Skip a Rope	Henson Cargill
March 9	Skip a Rope	Henson Cargill
March 16	Take Me to Your World	Tammy Wynette
March 23	Rosanna's Gone Wild	Johnny Cash
March 30	Rosanna's Gone Wild	Johnny Cash
April 6	Rosanna's Gone Wild	Johnny Cash
April 13	A World of Our Own	Sonny James
April 20	Turn Down the Music	Myrna Lorrie
April 27	Turn Down the Music	Myrna Lorrie
May 4	You Are My Treasure	Jack Greene
May 11	Fist City	Loretta Lynn
May 18	Have a Little Faith	David Houston
May 25	Wild Week-End	Bill Anderson
June 1	Honey	Bobby Goldsboro
June 8	Honey	Bobby Goldsboro
June 15	I Wanna Live	Glen Campbell
June 22	I Wanna Live	Glen Campbell
June 29	D-I-V-O-R-C-E	Tammy Wynette
July 6	D-I-V-O-R-C-E	Tammy Wynette
July 13	D-I-V-O-R-C-E	Tammy Wynette
July 20	Folsom Prison Blues	Johnny Cash
August 5	Folsom Prison Blues	Johnny Cash
August 19	What's Made Milwaukee Famous (Has Made a Loser Out of Me)	Jerry Lee Lewis
August 26	Already It's Heaven	David Houston
September 2	Dreams of the Everyday Housewife	Glen Campbell
September 9	Dreams of the Everyday Housewife	Glen Campbell
September 16	Harper Valley PTA	Jeannie C. Riley
September 23	Harper Valley PTA	Jeannie C. Riley
September 30	Only Daddy That'll Walk the Line	Waylon Jennings
October 7	Applesauce	Lynn Jones
October 14	Applesauce	Lynn Jones
October 21	Big Girls Don't Cry	Lynn Anderson
October 28	I Just Came to Get My Baby	Faron Young
November 4	Happy State of Mind	Bill Anderson
November 11	Then You Can Tell Me Goodbye	Eddy Arnold
November 18	When You Are Gone	Jim Reeves
November 25	Mama Tried	Merle Haggard
December 2	Where Love Used to Live	David Houston
December 9	Stand by Your Man	Tammy Wynette
December 16	Little Arrows	Leapy Lee
December 23	I Take a Lot of Pride in What I Am	Merle Haggard
December 30	I Take a Lot of Pride in What I Am	Merle Haggard

== See also ==
- 1968 in music
