= Countrypärlor =

Studio album by Mona Gustafsson
- Released: April 21, 2010
- Genre: country
- Length: 38.52 minutes
- Label: Scranta
- Producer: Dennis Lagerqvist

Mona Gustafsson chronology
Mona (1977)	Countrypärlor (2010)	Countrypärlor 2 (2012)

Countrypärlor was released on 21 April 2010, and is a studio album by Mona Gustafsson, mostly consisting of cover recordings of country songs, and the own-composed songs En liten bit av mitt hjärta and Hur kan du tro att jag ska glömma.

The song "En liten bit av mitt hjärta" charted at Norska Dansbandstoppen for 10 weeks and at Sverigetoppen for five weeks. Somebody Else Will was also tested for the chart in 2009, but failed to enter.

== Track listing ==
#	Title	Writer	Length
1.	"Wait a Minute"	Rodney Croewell, Hank Devito	2.47
2.	"Don't Darken My Door Step"	Anders Glenmark, Tomas Minor	3.43
3.	"Together Again"	Buck Owens	3.54
4.	"Rose Garden"	Joe South	3.10
5.	"En liten bit av mitt hjärta"	Mona Gustafsson	3.52
6.	"Help Me Make It Through the Night"	Kris Kristofferson	3.06
7.	"Undercover Lovers"	Paul Hotchkiss, Sandra Johnson	2.51
8.	"Top of the World"	John Bettis, Richard Carpenter	3.06
9.	"Hur kan du tro att jag ska glömma"	Mona Gustafsson	3.31
10.	"Somebody Else Will"	Anders Glenmark, Tomas Minor	3.02
11.	"I Don't Wanna Play House"	Billy Sherril, Glen Sutton	2.46
12.	"Some Days Are Diamonds"	Dick Feller	3.04

== Personnel ==
- Producer – Dannis Lagerqvist
- Recording: Liquid Studio
- Mastering: Conny Ebergård, Sweton
- Mixning (track 8) Lars Rosin
- Photo: Ateljé Braun AB
- Design: Forma
- Mattias Olofsson – steel guitar
- Marcus Persson – guitar
