= My Country (disambiguation) =

"My Country" is a poem about Australia written by Dorothea Mackellar.

My Country may also refer to:

- My Country: The New Age, a 2019 South Korean television series
- My Country (1986 film), an Australian film
- My Country (2011 film), a Brazilian drama film

== Music ==
- My Country (album), a 1968 album by George Jones
- "My Country" (Midnight Oil song)
- "My Country" (Roger Taylor song)
- Má vlast or My Country, a set of six symphonic poems composed by Bedřich Smetana
