= Fist City (Loretta Lynn album) =

Studio album by Loretta Lynn
- Released: April 15, 1968
- Recorded: April 20, 1967–March 22, 1968
- Studios: Bradley's Barn, Mount Juliet, Tennessee
- Genre: Country
- Length: 25:36
- Label: Decca
- Producer: Owen Bradley

Loretta Lynn chronology
| Who Says God Is Dead! (1968) | Fist City (1968) | Here's Loretta Lynn (1968) |

Singles from Fist City
- 1. "What Kind of a Girl (Do You Think I Am?)" Released: August 14, 1967; 2. "Fist City" Released: January 29, 1968

Fist City is the twelfth solo studio album by American country music singer-songwriter Loretta Lynn. It was released on April 15, 1968, by Decca Records.

== Critical reception ==
Professional ratings
Review scores
| Source | Rating |
|---|---|
| AllMusic | 4.5/5 stars |

In the issue dated May 4, 1968, Billboard magazine published a review of the album, saying, "Loretta Lynn couples potent lyrics with intense emotion on this LP. Call it county soul. "You Never Were Mine" is a tear jerker. An excellent LP."

The April 27, 1968 issue of Cashbox featured a review which said, "Highlighted by her No. 1 smash, "Fist City", Loretta Lynn's latest album is a powerhouse effort that's bound to be climbing the charts in short order. Loretta’s warm, sincere singing has long made her the uncontested Queen of Country Music, and she seems only to get better with each successive disk." The review highlighted "Fist City", "A Satisfied Mind", "I Don’t Wanna Play House", and "What Kind of a Girl (Do You Think I Am?)" as the best songs on the album.

== Commercial performance ==
The album peaked at No. 1 on the US Billboard Hot Country LP's chart, becoming Lynn's second album to top the chart.

The first single, "What Kind of a Girl (Do You Think I Am)" was released in August 1967 and peaked at No. 5 on the US Billboard Hot Country Singles chart. The second single, "Fist City", was released in January 1968 and peaked at No. 1 on the chart, making it Lynn's second No. 1 hit.

== Recording ==
Recording sessions for the album began on January 9, 1968, at Bradley's Barn in Mount Juliet, Tennessee. Two additional sessions followed on March 21 and March 22. "What Kind of a Girl (Do You Think I Am)" was recorded during the April 20, 1967 session for 1967's Singin' with Feelin'.

== Track listing ==
Side one
| No. | Title | Writer(s) | Recording date | Length |
|---|---|---|---|---|
| 1. | "Fist City" | Loretta Lynn | January 9, 1968 | 2:10 |
| 2. | "Jackson Ain't a Very Big Town" | Vic McAlphin | March 21, 1968 | 2:16 |
| 3. | "You Didn't Like My Lovin'" | Joe "Red" Hayes; Lynn; Teddy Wilburn | March 22, 1968 | 1:52 |
| 4. | "I've Got Texas in My Heart" | Mildred Burk; Rose Burk | January 9, 1968 | 2:14 |
| 5. | "You Never Were Mine" | Jay Lee Webb | March 22, 1968 | 2:09 |
| 6. | "Somebody's Back in Town" | Lynn; Doyle Wilburn; T. Wilburn | March 21, 1968 | 2:34 |

Side two
| No. | Title | Writer(s) | Recording date | Length |
|---|---|---|---|---|
| 1. | "A Satisfied Mind" | Joe "Red" Hayes; Jack Rhodes | March 21, 1968 | 2:42 |
| 2. | "How Long Will It Take?" | Warren McPherson | March 22, 1968 | 2:23 |
| 3. | "I Don't Wanna Play House" | Billy Sherrill; Glenn Sutton | March 21, 1968 | 2:32 |
| 4. | "I'm Shootin' for Tomorrow" | Lynn | March 22, 1968 | 1:55 |
| 5. | "What Kind of a Girl (Do You Think I Am)" | Lynn; T. Wilburn | April 20, 1967 | 2:49 |

== Personnel ==
Adapted from the album liner notes and Decca recording session records.

- Harold Bradley – electric bass guitar
- Owen Bradley – producer
- Hal Buksbaum – photography
- Floyd Cramer – piano
- Ray Edenton – guitar, acoustic guitar
- Larry Estes – drums
- Buddy Harman – drums
- Junior Huskey – bass
- The Jordanaires - background vocals
- Loretta Lynn – lead vocals
- Grady Martin – guitar, lead electric guitar
- Harold Morrison – banjo
- Hal Rugg – steel guitar
- Pete Wade – guitar
- Joe Zinkan – bass

== Charts ==
Album

| Chart (1968) | Peak position |
|---|---|
| US Hot Country Albums (Billboard) | 1 |

Singles

| Title | Year | Peak position | |
| Title | Year | US Country | CAN Country |
|---|---|---|---|
| "What Kind of a Girl (Do You Think I Am?)" | 1967 | 5 | 6 |
| "Fist City" | 1968 | 1 | 1 |
