= Countrypärlor 2 =

Studio album by Mona Gustafsson
- Released: September 26, 2012
- Genre: country
- Length: 38.52 minutes
- Label: Scranta

Mona Gustafsson chronology
Countrypärlor (2010)	Countrypärlor 2 (2012)

Countrypärlor 2 is a 2012 Mona Gustafsson studio album. The album mostly consists of country cover songs, but also the own-composed song "Som ljuset på min jord", which was also released as a single in late 2011, and scored successes at the Internet-based chart Pop i topp where it stayed for 10 weeks.

== Track listing ==
1. Blame it on Your Lyin' Heart
2. Crying Time
3. Yellow Roses
4. Tennessee Waltz
5. Som ljuset på min jord
6. Blue Eyes Crying in the Rain
7. If You Love Me Let Me Know
8. Forget Me Not
9. Let Your Love Flow
10. Your Cheatin' Heart
11. Every Little Thing
