= If My Heart Had Windows (George Jones album) =

Studio album by George Jones
- Released: April 1968
- Genre: Country
- Label: Musicor
- Producer: Pappy Daily

George Jones chronology
Sings the Songs of Dallas Frazier (1968)	If My Heart Had Windows (1968)	The George Jones Story (1968)

Singles from If My Heart Had Windows
- 1. "If My Heart Had Windows" Released: October 7, 1967; 2. "Unwanted Babies (as by Glen Patterson)" Released: November 1967; 3. "Say It's Not You" Released: January 24, 1968

Professional ratings
Review scores
Source	Rating
Allmusic	3/5 stars

If My Heart Had Windows is an album by American country music artist George Jones released in 1968 on the Musicor Records label.

If My Heart Had Windows rose to number 13 on the country music album chart. In 1988, Patty Loveless recorded the song for her second album If My Heart Had Windows and the song was her first top ten hit.

As recounted in Rich Kienzle's 2016 book The Grand Tour, at least one account survives of DJ Ralph Emery playing "Unwanted Babies" when George visited his late-night show, and an upset and embarrassed George insisting, 'It's not me, Ralph! It's not me!"

== Track listing ==
No.	Title	Writer(s)	Length
1.	"If My Heart Had Windows"	Dallas Frazier	2:24
2.	"Between My House and Town"	Sanger D. Shafer	2:27
3.	"On Second Thought"	Charlie Carter	2:22
4.	"Possum Holler"	Dallas Frazier	2:15
5.	"Unwanted Babies"	Earl Montgomery	2:22
6.	"Say It's Not You"	Dallas Frazier	2:26
7.	"Wrong Side of the World"	Alex Zanetis	2:25
8.	"Stranger's Me"	Dallas Frazier	2:00
9.	"Your Angel Steps Out of Heaven"	Jack Ripley	2:12
10.	"The Poor Chinee"	Eddie Noack, V. Feuerbacher	1:58

== Personnel ==
- The Jordanaires – vocal accompaniment

== Chart performance ==
Chart (1968)	Peak position
US Top Country Albums (Billboard)	12

== Charting Singles ==
Single	Chart	Peak position
If My Heart Had Windows	U.S. Billboard Hot Country Singles	7
Say It's Not You	U.S. Billboard Hot Country Singles	8
