= Mona G:s orkester =

- Origin: Växjö, Sweden
- Genres: dansband music
- Years active: 1996-2009

Mona G:s orkester was a dansband in Växjö, Sweden, founded in 1996 in that town by Mona Gustafsson, Patrik Ahlm and René Saulesco, former members of Leif Bloms, which had been disbanded on 31 December 1996. The band's first gig was at "Sommarlust" in Kristianstad during the 1996 Epiphany holiday.

== Discography ==
=== Albums ===
- "Många vackra stunder" - 2001
- "Du finns alltid i mitt hjärta" - 2006

=== Singles ===
- "Lite av din tid lite av din kärlek/Ung blåögd och blyg" - 1996
- "Med dig är himlen alltid blå/Vägen hem till dig" - 1996
- "La Romantica" - 1998
- "Vid älvens strand" - 1998
- "Aldrig nån som du" - 1999
- "Jag hörde änglarna sjunga" - 1999
- "Bortom natten finns en dag" - 2001
- "Ditt liv är nu" - 2002
- "Trivselvarning special" - 2002
- "Om så himlen faller ner" - 2003
- "Vem ska älska dig som jag" - 2004
- "Om du tror att jag glömt" - 2004
- "Jag ska inte räkna tårarna" - 2005
- "Vem kan älska dig som jag"/"Jag ska inte räkna tårarna" - 2005
- "Du finns alltid i mitt hjärta" - 2006
- "Inte en dag utan dig (i mina tankar) (radio single) - 2006
- "Så länge mina ögon ser" (radio single) - 2007
- "Hur kan du tro att jag ska glömma" - 2008

=== Video ===
- "La Romantica" - 1998

== Svensktoppen songs ==
- "Med dig är himlen alltid blå" - 1996
- "Aldrig nå'n som du" - 1999
- "Jag hörde änglarna sjunga" - 1999

=== Failed to enter chart ===
- "La Romantica" - 1998
