= Hey Little One =

1968 studio album by Glen Campbell

Hey, Little One

Studio album by Glen Campbell
- Released: March 1968
- Recorded: 1968
- Studio: Capitol (Hollywood)
- Genre: Country, pop
- Length: 29:26
- Label: Capitol
- Producer: Al De Lory

Glen Campbell chronology
By the Time I Get to Phoenix (1967)	Hey, Little One (1968)	A New Place in the Sun (1968)

Professional ratings
Review scores
Source	Rating
AllMusic	3.5/5 stars

Hey, Little One is the eighth studio album by American singer-guitarist Glen Campbell, released in 1968 by Capitol Records. The single "I Wanna Live" became Campbell's first number-one hit on the country charts.

== Track listing ==
Side 1

1. "Hey, Little One" (Dorsey Burnette, Barry De Vorzon) – 2:32
2. "Elusive Butterfly" (Bob Lind) – 2:17
3. "That's All That Matters" (Hank Cochran) – 2:29
4. "Break My Mind" (John D. Loudermilk) – 2:49
5. "Take Me Back" (Teddy Randazzo) – 2:38
6. "I Don't Believe You (She Acts Like We Never Have Met)" (Bob Dylan) – 2:39

Side 2

1. "I Wanna Live" (John D. Loudermilk) – 2:42
2. "It's Over" (Roy Orbison, Bill Dees) – 2:38
3. "Turn Around and Look at Me" (Jerry Capehart, Glen Campbell) – 2:50
4. "Woman, Woman" (Jim Glaser, Jimmy Payne) – 3:08
5. "The Impossible Dream (The Quest)" (Joe Darion, Mitch Leigh) – 2:44

== Personnel ==
- Glen Campbell – vocals, acoustic guitar
- Al Casey – acoustic guitar
- Bob Felts – drums
- Earl Palmer – drums, percussion
- Joe Osborn – bass guitar
- Doug Dillard – banjo
- Jim Gordon – drums

== Charts ==
Album – Billboard (United States)

Chart	Entry date	Peak position
Billboard Country Albums	03/30/1968	1
Billboard 200	4/6/1968	26

Singles – Billboard (United States)

Year	Single	Hot Country Singles	Hot 100	Easy Listening
1968	"Hey, Little One"	13	54	20
1968	"I Wanna Live"	1	36	18
