= What Kind of a Girl (Do You Think I Am) =

Single by Loretta Lynn

from the album Fist City
- B-side: "Bargain Basement Dress"
- Released: August 1967
- Recorded: 20 April 1967
- Studio: Bradley's Barn, Mount Juliet, Tennessee
- Genre: Honky tonk country
- Length: 2:49
- Label: Decca
- Songwriter(s): Loretta Lynn; Teddy Wilburn
- Producer(s): Owen Bradley

Loretta Lynn singles chronology
"If You're Not Gone Too Long" (1967)	"What Kind of a Girl (Do You Think I Am)" (1967)	"Fist City" (1968)

"What Kind of a Girl (Do You Think I Am)" is a song written by Loretta Lynn and Teddy Wilburn that was also recorded by Australian country music artist Jean Stafford.

== Background and reception ==
"What Kind of a Girl (Do You Think I Am)" was recorded at Bradley's Barn studio in Mount Juliet, Tennessee on January 18, 1967. The session was produced by the studio's owner, renowned country music producer Owen Bradley. Three additional tracks were recorded during this session.

"What Kind of a Girl (Do You Think I Am)" reached number five on the Billboard Hot Country Singles survey in 1967. The song became her eleventh top ten single under the Decca recording label. Secondly, the song became Lynn's first single to chart in Canada. It peaked at number six on the Canadian RPM Country Tracks chart. It was included on her studio album, Fist City (1968).

== Track listings ==
7" vinyl single

- "What Kind of a Girl (Do You Think I Am)" – 2:49
- "Bargain Basement Dress" – 2:25

== Charts ==
=== Weekly charts ===
Chart (1968)	Peak position
Canada Country Songs (RPM)	6
US Hot Country Singles (Billboard)	5
