= Softly (Hank Locklin album) =

Studio album by Hank Locklin
- Released: December 1968
- Recorded: November 1968
- Studio: RCA Victor Studio
- Genre: Country; Nashville Sound
- Label: RCA Victor
- Producer: Chet Atkins; Danny Davis

Hank Locklin chronology
My Love Song for You (1968)	Softly (1968)	Lookin' Back (1969)

Singles from Softly
- 1. "Where the Blue of the Night Meets the Gold of the Day" Released: January 1969

Softly is a studio album by American country singer–songwriter Hank Locklin. It was released in December 1968 via RCA Victor Records and contained 11 tracks. The album was co-produced by Chet Atkins and Danny Davis. Softly was Locklin's nineteenth studio album released in his career and third to be released in 1968. It contained one single, "Where the Blue of the Night Meets the Gold of the Day." The song became a charting single in 1969. The album itself would also reach a charting position following its original release.

== Background and content ==
Hank Locklin had several years of limited commercial success during the mid 1960s. In 1968 however, his single titled "The Country Hall of Fame," reached the top ten of the American country charts. This brought a commercial resurgence to his career. His recent success prompted RCA Victor to release additional studio material of Locklin's, including Softly. The album was recorded in November 1968 at the RCA Victor Studio, located in Nashville, Tennessee. The sessions were co-produced by Chet Atkins and Danny Davis. It was Locklin's second studio effort to be co-produced by both men. Softly consisted of 11 tracks. Many of the record's tracks were new material. Also included was a cover of Merle Haggard's "Today I Started Loving You Again." "With One Exception" was originally a hit for country artist David Houston. The album's eventual lead single was also a cover of the hit, notably recorded by Bing Crosby.

== Release and chart performance ==
Softly was released in December 1968 via RCA Victor Records. The record marked Locklin's nineteenth studio album release in his career. It was originally distributed as a vinyl LP, containing six songs on "side A" and five songs on "side B." In the 2010s, it was re-released in a digital format for music downloads and streaming. Softly spent six weeks on the Billboard Top Country Albums chart and peaked at number 32 in March 1969. It would be Locklin's final album to chart any Billboard list. One single was spawned from the album: "Where the Blue of the Night Meets the Gold of the Day." It was released on RCA Victor in January 1969. The single spent ten weeks on the Billboard Hot Country Songs chart and peaked at number 34 in March 1969. It was Locklin's final top 40 entry on the Billboard country songs chart.

== Track listings ==
=== Vinyl version ===
Side one
No.	Title	Writer(s)	Length
1.	"Softly"	Ray Griff	2:08
2.	"Today I Started Loving You Again"	Merle Haggard	2:13
3.	"From Heaven to Heartache"	Ben Peters	2:40
4.	"And Then"	Gloria Shayne	2:38
5.	"Always Missing You"	Jean Chapel; Alda Cologne	2:22
6.	"Happy Face"	Becki Bluefield	3:05

Side two
No.	Title	Writer(s)	Length
1.	"Where the Blue of the Night Meets the Gold of the Day"	Fred Ahlert; Bing Crosby; Roy Turk	2:30
2.	"With One Exception"	Billy Sherrill; Glenn Sutton	2:34
3.	"Turn Ole Nothing Loose"	Charlie Craig	2:12
4.	"Imagination Running Wild"	David Turner	2:51
5.	"It Hardly Hurts Anymore"	Dolores Fuller; Ben Raleigh	2:55

=== Digital version ===
Softly
No.	Title	Writer(s)	Length
1.	"Softly"	Griff	2:15
2.	"Today I Started Loving You Again"	Haggard	2:14
3.	"From Heaven to Heartache"	Peters	2:34
4.	"And Then"	Shayne	2:40
5.	"Always Missing You"	Chapel; Cologne	2:27
6.	"Happy Face"	Bluefield	3:11
7.	"Where the Blue of the Night Meets the Gold of the Day"	Ahlert; Crosby; Turk	2:27
8.	"With One Exception"	Sherrill; Sutton	2:34
9.	"Turn Ole Nothing Loose"	Craig	2:12
10.	"Imagination Running Wild"	Turner	2:52
11.	"It Hardly Hurts Anymore"	Fuller; Raleigh	2:58

== Personnel ==
All credits are adapted from the liner notes of Softly.

Musical and technical personnel

- Chet Atkins – producer
- Danny Davis – producer
- Hank Locklin – lead vocals
- Bill McElhiney – arrangement

== Chart performance ==
Chart (1968–69)	Peak position
US Top Country Albums (Billboard)	32

== Release history ==
Region	Date	Format	Label	Ref.
Canada	December 1968	Vinyl	RCA Victor	
United States	December 1968	Vinyl	RCA Victor	
United States	2010s	Digital; Streaming	Sony Music Entertainment	
