= My Elusive Dreams (David Houston and Tammy Wynette album) =

Studio album by David Houston and Tammy Wynette
- Released: August 1967
- Recorded: June 1967
- Studio: Columbia (Nashville, Tennessee)
- Genre: Country; Nashville Sound
- Label: Epic
- Producer: Billy Sherrill

David Houston chronology
Golden Hymns (1967)	My Elusive Dreams (1967)	You Mean the World to Me (1967)

Tammy Wynette chronology
Your Good Girl's Gonna Go Bad (1967)	My Elusive Dreams (1967)	Take Me to Your World / I Don't Wanna Play House (1968)

Singles from My Elusive Dreams
- 1. "My Elusive Dreams" Released: June 1967; 2. "It's All Over" Released: December 1967

My Elusive Dreams is a studio album by American country artists David Houston and Tammy Wynette. It was released on Epic Records in August 1967 and contained ten tracks. It was the duo's first and only collaborative album together. My Elusive Dreams contained mostly duets between Houston and Wynette (two solo tracks by both artists were also included). The album was named for the title track, which topped the American country songs chart in 1967. Another single titled "It's All Over" also became a commercially-successful country song. The album received positive reviews following its release.

== Background and content ==
Both David Houston and Tammy Wynette had individual careers as country music artists. Both individuals also shared the same producer, Billy Sherrill. Houston first achieved success through Epic Records. In 1966, he reached his commercial peak with the number one country single, "Almost Persuaded". It crossed over to the pop charts and received accolades from the Grammy Awards. Wynette signed with Epic in 1966 and had her first chart success with 1967's "Your Good Girl's Gonna Go Bad". Sherrill chose to pair the two together after composing with Glenn Sutton the song "My Elusive Dreams". Originally, Sherrill wanted it to be a solo release for Wynette but changed his mind and decided to also make an album of duets between the pair.

My Elusive Dreams was recorded in June 1967 at the Columbia Studios, located in Nashville, Tennessee. The album contained a total of ten tracks. Eight of these tracks were duets between Houston and Wynette. This included three songs which were covers: Patsy Cline's "Back in Baby's Arms", Hank Williams's "Hey Good Lookin'" and "Somethin' Stupid". The latter was originally a duet by Frank Sinatra and Nancy Sinatra. Other duets included the title track, "It's All Over" and "I'll Take My Chances with You". Two solo recordings also appear. "Set Me Free" is performed solely by Wynette while "Clinging Vine" is performed solely by Houston.

== Critical reception ==
Professional ratings
Review scores
Source	Rating
Allmusic	3.5/5 stars

A review published in the August 19, 1967 issue of Billboard said, "Now and then a country duet set the field on fire and when these two artists—both outstanding on their own—teamed up, their "My Elusive Dreams" raced up the chart and even scored pop sales. The duo follows up that hit with sensational performances on "Somethin' Stupid" and "Back in Baby's Arms", among others." Cashbox also published a review in their August 19, 1967 issue, which read, "Look out for David Houston and Tammy Wynette to grab a top chart spot with this groovy LP. The set, which bears the same title as the duo's current chart-climbing single, includes, in addition to "My Elusive Dreams", nine other striking tracks, notably "Ill Take My Chances with You", "Somethin' Stupid" and "Marriage on the Rocks". Watch this one move." A review published by Record World said, ""My Elusive Dreams" by Curly Putman and Billy Sherrill is certainly one of the best songs of the year and makes this high quality duet album that much better. Tammy and David also do "Somethin' Stupid", "Hey Good Lookin'" and more." The album also features Wynette's first songwriting credit.

== Release, chart performance and singles ==
My Elusive Dreams was released in August 1967. It was distributed as a vinyl LP, containing five songs on either side of the record. It was the pair's first and only album collection together. They would both later record duets with other artists; Houston would collaborate with Barbara Mandrell while Wynette would collaborate with future husband, George Jones. After its release, the album peaked at number 11 on the American Billboard Country LP's chart. The title track topped the Billboard Hot Country Songs chart in 1967 while "It's All Over" reached number 11 on the same chart. The album has never had any further releases and is not currently available on any streaming platforms.

== Track listing ==
Side one
No.	Title	Writer(s)	Length
1.	"My Elusive Dreams"	Curly Putman; Billy Sherrill	2:48
2.	"I'll Take My Chances with You"	Marge Barton; Fred MacRae	2:25
3.	"Hey Good Lookin'"	Hank Williams	2:27
4.	"Set Me Free" (Solo: Tammy Wynette)	Putman	2:16
5.	"Together We Stand (Divided We Fall)"	Don Chapel; Tammy Wynette	2:12

Side two
No.	Title	Writer(s)	Length
1.	"Somethin' Stupid"	Carson Parks	2:34
2.	"Back in Baby's Arms"	Bob Montgomery	2:25
3.	"It's All Over"	Sherrill; Glenn Sutton	2:30
4.	"Clinging Vine" (Solo: David Houston)	Leon Carr; Grace Lane; Earl Shuman	2:38
5.	"Marriage on the Rocks"	Sherrill; Sutton	2:47

== Personnel ==
All credits are adapted from the liner notes of My Elusive Dreams.

- David Houston – lead vocals
- Michael Mendel – cover design
- Billy Sherrill – producer
- Tammy Wynette – lead vocals

== Chart performance ==
Chart (1967)	Peak position
US Top Country Albums (Billboard)	11

== Release history ==
Region	Date	Format	Label	Ref.
North America	August 1967	Vinyl	Epic Records	
