= I Don't Wanna Play House =

1967 song by Tammy Wynette

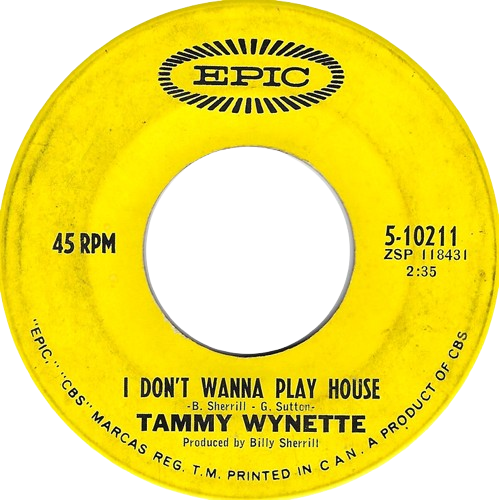

Single by Tammy Wynette

from the album Take Me to Your World / I Don't Wanna Play House
- B-side: "Soakin' Wet"
- Released: July 1967
- Studio: Columbia (Nashville, Tennessee)
- Genre: Country
- Length: 2:38
- Label: Epic; 5-10211
- Songwriters: Billy Sherrill; Glenn Sutton
- Producer: Billy Sherrill

Tammy Wynette singles chronology
"Your Good Girl's Gonna Go Bad" (1967)	"I Don't Wanna Play House" (1967)	"Take Me to Your World" (1967)

"I Don't Wanna Play House"

Single by Connie Francis
- B-side: "Am I Blue"
- Released: August 1968
- Genre: Country
- Length: 3:05
- Label: MGM Records
- Songwriters: Billy Sherrill; Glenn Sutton
- Producers: Bobby Russel; Buzz Cason

Connie Francis singles chronology
"Somebody Else Is Taking My Place" (1968)	"I Don't Wanna Play House" (1968)	"The Wedding Cake" (1969)

"I Don't Wanna Play House" is a song written by Billy Sherrill and Glenn Sutton. In 1967, the song was Tammy Wynette's first number one country song as a solo artist.

== Tammy Wynette version ==
=== Release ===
"I Don't Wanna Play House" by Tammy Wynette was released as a seven-inch single in July 1967 by Epic Records. The recording earned Wynette the 1968 Grammy Award for Best Female Country Vocal Performance. It was backed by another country song, "Soakin' Wet" on the B-side, which didn't see an immediate album inclusion.

=== Charts ===
"I Don't Wanna Play House" by Tammy Wynette spent three weeks at the top spot and a total of eighteen weeks on the Billboard Hot Country Singles chart. The song was also later released in the UK in 1976 and made the Top 40.

== Content ==
In the song, the narrator, a young mother whose husband has left her, overhears her daughter describing to a neighborhood boy their broken home, and informing him that she doesn't want to play house since, after observing her parents' troubles, she knows that it cannot be fun.

== Chart performance ==
Chart (1967)	Peak position
U.S. Billboard Hot Country Singles	1
Canadian RPM Country Tracks	3

Chart (1976)	Peak position
U.K. Singles Chart	37

== Barbara Ray versions ==
In 1973, South African singer Barbara Ray recorded a version that was a number-one hit in her home country as well as a top 10 hit in Australia, reaching No. 3 later in the year. Her version was South Africa's highest-selling single of 1973.

=== Charts ===
Chart (1973)	Peak position
Australia (Kent Music Report)	3

== Other versions ==
- Connie Francis released a cover version of the song in August 1968. It peaked at No. 40 on Billboard's Easy Listening Charts.
- Skeeter Davis covered the song on her 1968 album Why So Lonely?.
- Lynn Anderson (then the wife of the song's co-writer, Sutton) covered the song in 1970 on her album Rose Garden.
- Loretta Lynn covered the song on her 1968 album, Fist City.
- Mona Gustafsson recorded the song on her 2010 album Countrypärlor.
