= Leif Bloms =

Swedish dansband

- Origin: Växjö, Sweden
- Genres: dansband music
- Years active: 1956-1995
- Labels: Telestar, RCA Victor, Viking, Tor, RCA, Låg Music, Mariann, Anette

Leif Bloms was a dansband in Växjö in Sweden. scoring chart successes at the Swedish album chart during the mid-late 1970s.

== Background ==
The nucleus of the band was three brothers from Växjö. They tried to get a break for a few years when in 1958, they became known as Leif Blom's Orchestra. They debuted with the single "En liten gnista". Appearing on the popular television show in 1968, Nygammalt, they were seen and heard by an audience of three million.

The 1968 line up of the group was Åke Blom (electric guitar), Gert Blom (trumpet, electric guitar); Leif Blom (organ), Sven Erik Hanson (bass, acoustic guitar), Hans Peter Heigis (drums), and Ingrid Jones (vocals).

On 31 December 1995 the band was disbanded after singing and playing together for almost 40 years.

One of the singers in the band was Lisbeth Magnusson. According to an article on Sveriges Radio, she came on board in the 1970s. She is married to Hasse Magnusson, the saxophonist of the band Thorleifs.

== Career ==
=== 1960s ===
The group released the single, "En Liten Gnista" / "Min Lyckostjärna" with Ingrid Jones on vocals. Credited to Leif Bloms med Ingrid Jones, it was released on Anette AS 120 in 1968. The same year, they released the single, "Om Sanningen Ska Fram" / "Låt Oss Möta Sommaren" that they had recorded with singer Lisbeth (Lisbeth Magnusson). Credited to Leif Bloms med Lisbeth, it was released on Anette AS 132.

=== 1970s ===
Leif Bloms recorded the song " Då föddes kärleken". Backed with "Trumpetens sång", it was released Anette AS 190 in 1971.

In 1976, their album, Här igen was released. It entered the Swedish charts on 26 April 1975. Spending four weeks in the chart, it peaked at no. 26.

Their album Hem till dig was released in 1977. It entered the chart in Sweden on 22 April that year. It peaked at 34 during its two-week run.

The group's En souvenir album was released in 1978. It spent a week in the chart, peaking at no. 34 on 19 May 1978.

In 1979, their album Vem får din sång was released on Tor TORS 2209. It contained the songs, "Nu har du tänt mej" ("Baby I'm Burnin"), "It's A Cowboy Loving Night", "Vem får din sång" ("Mexican Girl"), "Skateboard-ooh-ah-ah" and an instrumental version of "Aloha ʻOe".

=== 1980s - 1990s ===
Starting with the 1981 album Håll dig kvar, the band's singer was Mona Gustafsson, who wrote the band's 1992 song "Dej ska jag älska all min tid" which won the 1992 Hänt song contest in Älvsjö.

After the band was disbanded, Mona Gustafsson, Patrik Ahlm and René Saulesco founded another dansband, Mona G:s orkester.

== Members ==
=== From start ===
- Åke Blom - guitar
- Leif Blom - keyboard
- Simon Blom - bass

=== Later members ===
- Gert Blom - trumpet, guitar, keyboard
- Mona Gustafsson - vocals (1981-1995)
- Svend Erik Hansèn - bass
- Peo Henriksson - bass, vocals
- Peter Heigis - drums
- Madeleine Käll - vocals
- Kenneth Karlsson - drums
- C A Olsson - drums
- Egon Olsson - drums
- Ingrid Jones - vocals
- Lisbeth Magnusson - vocals
- Ulf Lindstrand - drums, vocals
- Carina Jönsson - vocals
- Olle Hallstedt - drums, vocals
- Stefan Svensson - bass
- Renè Saulesco - drums, violin, vocals
- Patrik Ahlm - bass, vocals

== Discography ==
=== Album ===
- Leif Bloms orkester - 1973
- På världens tak - 1974
- Vilken härlig fest - 1975
- Här igen - 1976
- Hem till dej - 1977
- Amore - 1977
- En souvenir - 1977
- Vem får din sång - 1979
- Cindy - 1979
- Jul för dig och mig - 1980
- Håll dig kvar - 1981
- Jubileumsalbum - 1983
- Som en saga - 1984
- Alltid på väg - 1986
- Härligt ljusblåa ögon - 1988
- Bara för en stund (samling) - 1988
- Årets skiftningar - 1990
- Vilken underbar värld: 12 instrumentala önskemelodier - 1992
- Dej ska jag älska all min tid - 1993
- Det bästa som hänt (samling) - 1993
- En ring av guld (samling) - 1994
- Leif Bloms 20 bästa (samling) - 1997
- Nu och för alltid (samling) - 2008

=== Singles ===
- En liten gnista/Min lyckostjärna - 1968
- Lat oss slå på stora trumman/Nei jag kandig ej förlåta - 1968
- Om sanningen ska fram/Låt oss möta sommaren - 1968
- Det var du som stal mitt hjärta Carl Johan/Vill du vinna mig tillbaka - 1969
- Snart är våren här/Ta mej hem till din mamma - 1970
- Ticke ticke tong/Vilken underbar dag i dag - 1971
- Då föddes kärleken/Trumpetens sång - 1971
- Alla har vi våra drömmar/Klockornas sång - 1972
- Gotländsk sommarnatt/En tidlös dröm - 1974
- Vi ha glädjen tillsammans/Petter och Frida - 1974
- En gunga för två/En sommarnatt - 1975
- Vilken härlig fest/Säg fröken får jag en dans - 1975
- Du dansar verkligt bra/När sommaren kommer - 1976
- Vid mitt fönster/Angelique - 1977
- Vem får din sång/Substitud - 1978
- Oh Susie bara vi två vet/Yours - 1979
- Släng dej i väggen/Om du stannar kvar - 1988
- Ännu en gång/Finns det tro finns det hopp - 1991
- Jag vill ha dej för mig själv/En enda vår - 1990
- Jag sjunger för dej/När jag kysste lärar'n - 1991
- Stopp stanna upp/Tid att förstå - 1991
- Dej ska jag älska all min tid/Öppna ett fönster/Ensam med dig - 1992
- Det bästa som hänt/Det finns ingenting att hämta/Om du ser i mina ögon - 1993
- En ring av guld/Om du ser i mina ögon - 1994

== Melodier på Svensktoppen ==
- Då föddes kärleken - 1971 (with Gert Blom)
- Jag ska ta morfar med mig ut i kväll - 1977
- Nu och för alltid - 1993
- Det bästa som har hänt - 1993
- En ring av guld - 1994
