= My Love Song for You =

Studio album by Hank Locklin
- Released: August 1968
- Recorded: December 1967–May 1968
- Studio: RCA Victor Studio
- Genre: Country; Nashville Sound
- Label: RCA Victor
- Producer: Chet Atkins; Danny Davis

Hank Locklin chronology
Country Hall of Fame (1968)	My Love Song for You (1968)	Softly (1968)

Singles from My Love Song for You
- 1. "Love Song for You" Released: February 1968; 2. "Lovin' You (The Way I Do)" Released: October 1968

My Love Song for You is a studio album by American country singer–songwriter Hank Locklin. It was released in August 1968 via RCA Victor Records and contained 12 tracks. It was co-produced by Chet Atkins and Danny Davis. My Love Song for You was Locklin's eighteenth studio album released in his career and his second album to be released in 1968. The record included two singles, which became charting singles on the Billboard country chart. The album itself would also chart and receive positive reviews from music publications.

== Background and content ==
Hank Locklin had several years of limited commercial success during the mid 1960s. In 1968 however, his single titled "The Country Hall of Fame," reached the top ten of the American country charts. This brought a commercial resurgence to his career. Its success prompted Locklin's record label to release more studio albums. The recording of My Love Song for You took place in sessions held between December 1967 and May 1968. All sessions took place at the RCA Victor Studio, located in Nashville, Tennessee. The sessions were co-produced by Chet Atkins and Danny Davis. It was Locklin's first studio record to be produced by Davis.

The album contained a total of 12 tracks. According to the album's liner notes, Locklin had chosen all of the album's material himself by spreading out different records on the floor of his home. The album's title was derived from the record's conceptual theme: love songs. While new tracks were also contained, several covers of previously recorded songs were also included. Among its covers was "Danny Boy," "Before the Next Teardrop Falls," "The Minute You're Gone" and "You've Still Got a Place in My Heart."

== Release and reception ==
Professional ratings
Review scores
Source	Rating
Allmusic	4/5 stars
Billboard	Favorable

My Love Song for You was originally released in August 1968 on RCA Victor Records. The album marked Locklin's eighteenth studio release in his recording career. It was first distributed as a vinyl LP, containing six songs on either side of the record. In the 2010s, the album was re-released in a digital format to streaming and downloading services, such as Apple Music. My Love Song for You spent five weeks on the Billboard Top Country Albums chart and peaked at number 40 in October 1968. It was Locklin's fourth album to make the chart.

The project received positive reviews from critics following its release in 1968. Billboard magazine highlighted the album in its review of recent LP's, calling it "a fine example of the Nashville Sound." Writers noted that its piano and lyrical phrasing helped make it stand out from other releases at the time. Thom Owens of Allmusic gave it four out five stars in his review: "My Love Song for You is an excellent collection of country ballads highlighted by 'Danny Boy,' 'Longing to Hold You Again,' 'I Came So Close to Living Alone,' and the hit single 'Lovin' You (The Way I Do)'." The album included two singles. The first was the project's title track, which was first released in February 1968. Spending eight weeks on the Billboard Hot Country Songs chart, it peaked at number 40 there in April 1968. "Lovin' You (The Way I Do)" was released as the second single in October 1968. In November 1968, it had reached number 62 on the country songs chart.

== Track listings ==
=== Vinyl version ===
Side one
No.	Title	Writer(s)	Length
1.	"The Tender Side of Me"	Becki Bluefield; Ron Criss	2:36
2.	"Before the Next Teardrop Falls"	Vivian Keith; Ben Peters	2:20
3.	"Danny Boy"	Frederic Weatherly	2:57
4.	"Tonjours Moi (Always Me)"	Cindy Walker	2:30
5.	"Longing to Hold You Again"	Don Robertson	3:05
6.	"Loving Arms"	Walker	2:16

Side two
No.	Title	Writer(s)	Length
1.	"I'm Slowly Going Out of Your Mind"	Bluefield	2:41
2.	"The Minute You're Gone"	Jimmy Gateley	2:26
3.	"You've Still Got a Place in My Heart"	Leon Payne	2:38
4.	"Love Song for You"	Bob Merrill	2:43
5.	"I Came So Close to Living Alone"	Little Jimmy Dickens; Pete Hunter	2:26
6.	"Lovin' You (The Way I Do)"	Frank Peterson	2:55

=== Digital version ===
My Love Song for You
No.	Title	Writer(s)	Length
1.	"The Tender Side of Me"	Bluefield; Criss	2:38
2.	"Before the Next Teardrop Falls"	Keith; Peters	2:22
3.	"Danny Boy"	Weatherly	2:58
4.	"Tonjours Me (Always Me)"	Walker	2:28
5.	"Longing to Hold You Again"	Robertson	3:03
6.	"Loving Arms"	Walker	2:19
7.	"I'm Slowly Going Out of Your Mind"	Bluefield	2:39
8.	"The Minute You're Gone"	Gateley	2:27
9.	"You've Still Got a Place in My Heart"	Payne	2:37
10.	"Love Song for You"	Merrill	2:43
11.	"I Came So Close to Living Alone"	Dickens; Hunter	2:22
12.	"Lovin' You (The Way I Do)"	Peterson	2:53

== Personnel ==
All credits are adapted from the liner notes of My Love Song for You.

Musical and technical personnel

- Chet Atkins – producer
- Danny Davis – producer
- Hank Locklin – lead vocals
- Bill McElhiney – arrangement
- Al Pachucki – engineer
- Bill Vandevort – engineer
- Chuck Seitz – engineer

== Chart performance ==
Chart (1968)	Peak position
US Top Country Albums (Billboard)	40

== Release history ==
Region	Date	Format	Label	Ref.
Canada	August 1968	Vinyl	RCA Victor	
United Kingdom	August 1968	Vinyl	RCA Victor	
United States	August 1968	Vinyl	RCA Victor	
United States	2010s	Digital; Streaming	Sony Music Entertainment	
