= D-I-V-O-R-C-E (album) =

Studio album by Tammy Wynette
- Released: July 1968
- Recorded: March 22 – 25, 1968
- Studios: Columbia Studio B (Nashville, Tennessee)
- Genres: Country; Nashville Sound
- Label: Epic
- Producer: Billy Sherrill

Tammy Wynette chronology
Take Me to Your World / I Don't Wanna Play House (1968)	D-I-V-O-R-C-E (1968)	Stand by Your Man (1969)

Singles from D-I-V-O-R-C-E
- 1. "D-I-V-O-R-C-E" Released: April 1968

D-I-V-O-R-C-E is a studio album by American country artist Tammy Wynette. It was released in July 1968 via Epic Records and contained 11 tracks. Several recordings were cover tunes, including songs by Merle Haggard and The Beatles. Several new selections were also part of the collection, including the title track. Released as a single, the title track became Wynette's fourth number one song on the North American country charts in 1968. The album itself would also top the American country LP's chart in 1968. D-I-V-O-R-C-E received positive reviews from critics following its release.

== Background, recording and content ==
Tammy Wynette signed a recording contract with Epic Records in 1966 and her success began to grow over the next several years. By 1968, Wynette was having a series of number one singles on the country music charts, including "My Elusive Dreams", "I Don't Wanna Play House" and "D-I-V-O-R-C-E". The latter track, written by Bobby Braddock and Curly Putman, was brought to Wynette's attention by her producer, Billy Sherrill. "I hated myself for not writing that song. It fit my life completely," Wynette later commented. Her fourth studio album would be named for the song. The project was recorded at the Columbia Studio B, located in Nashville, Tennessee. Sessions took place between March 22 and March 25, 1968 and were all produced by Billy Sherrill.

The album consisted of 11 tracks. Including the title track, five songs on the album were new recordings. These included "All Night Long", "Come on Home", "When There's a Fire in Your Heart" and an answer song to Bobby Goldsboro's "Honey". Remaining songs on the album were cover tunes originally made commercially-successful as pop and country singles. The covers included a remake of The Beatles's "Yesterday", Ronnie Dove's "Kiss Away", Patsy Cline's "Sweet Dreams", Glen Campbell's "Gentle on My Mind" and Andy Williams's "Lonely Street".

== Release, reception and singles ==
Professional ratings
Review scores
Source	Rating
Allmusic	4.5/5 stars

D-I-V-O-R-C-E was originally released in July 1968 on Epic Records. It was the fourth studio album of Wynette's career. Epic distributed the album as a vinyl LP, with six songs on "side A" and five songs on "side B". It was re-released as a compact disc by eOne and Koch Records in 1998. It was then released digitally several years later. The album received a positive review from Billboard magazine in 1968. Reviewers praised her vocal delivery: "Tammy Wynette sings with feeling and power like no other, and this latest LP offering is sure to be much in demand by her numerous fans." Years later, Greg Adams of AllMusic gave it a 4.5 star-rating. "The vocal performances are excellent even on the more disposable material, and although nothing here approaches the level of the title track, the album is ultimately rewarding for those whose interest in Wynette extends beyond her greatest hits," he concluded.

Three months after its original release, the album reached the number one spot on the American Billboard Country LP's chart. It became Wynette's first album in her career to top the chart. The title track was the album's only single. Epic issued the single in April 1968. Two months later, it topped the Billboard Hot Country Songs chart. It became Wynette's fourth song number one country single. It also reached number 63 on the Billboard Hot 100 and topped Canada's RPM Country chart.

== Track listings ==
=== Vinyl version ===
Side one
No.	Title	Writer(s)	Length
1.	"Gentle on My Mind"	John Hartford	3:12
2.	"Honey (I Miss You)"	Bobby Russell	3:10
3.	"Legend of Bonnie and Clyde"	Merle Haggard; Bonnie Owens	2:02
4.	"All Night Long"	Don Chapel	2:24
5.	"Sweet Dreams"	Don Gibson	2:29
6.	"Yesterday"	Lennon–McCartney	1:56

Side two
No.	Title	Writer(s)	Length
1.	"D-I-V-O-R-C-E"	Bobby Braddock; Curly Putman	2:54
2.	"Come On Home"	George Richey; Jack Rhodes	2:27
3.	"When There's a Fire in Your Heart"	Merle Kilgore; Sonny Williams	2:39
4.	"Kiss Away"	Billy Sherrill; Glenn Sutton	2:25
5.	"Lonely Street"	Carl Belew; Kenny Sowder; W.S. Stevenson	2:08

=== CD and digital versions ===
D-I-V-O-R-C-E (compact disc and digital)
No.	Title	Writer(s)	Length
1.	"Gentle on My Mind"	Hartford	3:14
2.	"Honey (I Miss You)"	Russell	4:13
3.	"Legend of Bonnie and Clyde"	Haggard; Owens	2:03
4.	"All Night Long"	Chapel	2:25
5.	"Sweet Dreams"	Gibson	2:29
6.	"Yesterday"	Lennon–McCartney	1:58
7.	"D-I-V-O-R-C-E"	Braddock; Putman	2:57
8.	"Come On Home"	Richey; Rhodes	2:30
9.	"When There's a Fire in Your Heart"	Kilgore; Williams	2:41
10.	"Kiss Away"	Sherrill; Sutton	2:28
11.	"Lonely Street"	Belew; Sowder; Stevenson	2:18

== Personnel ==
All credits are adapted from the original liner notes of D-I-V-O-R-C-E and the re-issued version of the album in 1998.

Technical personnel

- Barry Feldman – Executive producer (1998 version)
- Bill Grimes – Photography
- Michael Mendel – Design
- Thomas Molesky – Design (1998 version)
- Dave Nives – Reissue inspiration (1998 version)
- Don Richardson, Sr. – Liner notes
- Billy Sherrill – Producer

== Chart performance ==
Chart (1968)	Peak position
US Billboard 200	147
US Top Country Albums (Billboard)	1

== Release history ==
Region	Date	Format	Label	Ref.
Japan	July 1968	Vinyl	CBS Records International; Sony Music	
North America	July 1968	Vinyl	Epic Records	
North America	February 17, 1998	Compact disc	eOne; Koch Records	
North America	2010s	Music download; streaming	Sony Music	
