= Barbara Ray =

British-South African singer

- Born: Barbara Ray McKenzie Brown; Dalmellington, East Ayrshire, Scotland
- Genres: Country and Western
- Occupation: Musician
- Instrument: Vocals

Barbara Ray McKenzie Brown is a Scottish-born singer, who was based in South Africa, where she released several albums and singles in the 70's and 80's.

Ray began her career singing with the Scottish Group The Sundowners in the early 1960s, and sang on their single Bill Bailey.

After moving to South Africa she found chart success with several singles such as a cover of the Tammy Wynette hit "I Don't Wanna Play House" (Number #3 in South Africa and top ten Australia), "Like I Do" and "Funny Face". She was awarded multiple Gold disks such as for "Silver Threads and Golden Needles", and Down The Mississippi,

In 1976 together with Bobby Angel she won a SARIE for vocal group and in 1979 together with Lance James she won the same award.

== Discography ==
Singles

- "Like I Do" Barbara Ray And The 5th Association (1971)
- "Where the Gypsies Play" Barbara Ray And The 5th Association (1971)
- "Happy Birthday Baby" with The Lindsay Heard Assembly (1971)
- "Silver Threads and Golden Needles" (1972)
- "Valley of the Moon" with The Lindsay Heard Assembly(1972)
- "Divorce" (1972)
- "I Don't Wanna Play House" (1973)
- "Single Girl" (1973)
- "Funny Face" (1974)
- "Joey" (1974)
- "Let Me Be There" (1974)
- "The Greatest Christmas Gift" with Bobby Angel (1975)
- "The Last One To Touch Me" (1975)
- "Republic Of South Africa" (1975)
- "Sad Movies" (1975)
- "After The Fire Is Gone" with Lance James (1977)
- "Bring Him Safely Home To Me" (1977)
- "Womanhood" (1979)
- "Down The Mississippi" (1980)
- "Tears On My Pillow" (1981)
- "Sayonara" (1982)
- "Voices" with Bobby Angel (1983)
- 'Wasn't That Love" with Bobby Angel (1983)
- "Walking Talking Dolly" (1984)

Albums

- Like I Do (1971)
- The Greatest Hits Featuring Valley Of The Moon with The Lindsay Heard Assembly (1972)
- The Barbara Ray Album (1972)
- Golden Hits Of Barbara Ray (1972)
- Double Gold (1972)
- Serenade of the Bells (1973)
- Dance On (1973)
- Single Girl (1973)
- I Don't Wanna Play House (1973)
- The Magic of Barbara Ray (1974)
- In the Valley of the Moon (1974)
- A Little Bit Country (1974)
- Barbara (1975)
- Bittersweet (1976)
- Republic of South Africa (1976)
- Who's Gonna Tie My Shoes (1976)
- 24 Golden Hits (1977)
- Bedtime Story (1977)
- I Need You (1978)
- Barbara and Lance with Lance James (1978)
- Walk Right Back with Lance James (1978)
- Welcome To My World with Lance James (1979)
- The Barbara Ray Collection (1979)
- Womanhood (1979)
- Barbara Ray Sings Her 20 Greatest Hits (1980)
- Down The Mississippi (1980)
- The Country Music Of Barbara Ray (1980)
- What's Wrong With The Way That We're Doing It Now (1981)
- Sayonara (1982)
- Our Own (1983)
- Like I Do (1983)
- The First Ten Years (1984)
- Sings Country Classics (1985)
- Made For Each Other (1985)
- 16 Greatest Love Songs (1985)
- The Very Best Of Barbara Ray (1988)
- Love Me Or Leave Me (1988)
