= Take Me to Your World / I Don't Wanna Play House =

Studio album by Tammy Wynette
- Released: January 1968
- Recorded: June – October 1967
- Studios: Columbia Studio B (Nashville, Tennessee)
- Genres: Country; Nashville Sound
- Label: Epic
- Producer: Billy Sherrill

Tammy Wynette chronology
My Elusive Dreams (1967)	Take Me to Your World / I Don't Wanna Play House (1968)	D-I-V-O-R-C-E (1968)

Singles from Take Me to Tour World / I Don't Wanna Play House
- 1. "I Don't Wanna Play House" Released: July 1967; 2. "Take Me to Your World" Released: December 1967

Professional ratings
Review scores
Source	Rating
Allmusic	4/5 stars

Take Me to Your World / I Don't Wanna Play House is a studio album by American country artist Tammy Wynette. It was released in January 1968 via Epic Records and contained 11 tracks. It was the third studio album of Wynette's career. The album featured several new recordings as well as covers of previously recorded material. Among the new recordings were two singles, which both topped the American country chart: "I Don't Wanna Play House" and "Take Me to Your World". The album itself reached the top five of the American country LP's chart in 1968. It received positive reviews from several publications following its release.

== Background, content and recording ==
Tammy Wynette had recently broken through as a country music artist with the top five single, "Your Good Girl's Gonna Go Bad", and a number one duet with David Houston, "My Elusive Dreams". Epic issued two studio albums of her material up to this point. Both were released in 1967 and her previous albums most contained covers of songs. With producer Billy Sherrill, Wynette recorded the tracks for her third studio album between June and October 1967. The tracks were cut by Sherrill at the Columbia Studios, located in Nashville, Tennessee. Engineer Lou Bradley recalled that the album's sound was built around the way Wynette sang the material. "I think the dynamics Billy [Sherrill] got evolved from Billy makin' the band play to Tammy. She'd sing the verses soft, and when she belted, he'd make the musicians play to that. That was just her way of singin," Bradley recalled.

Her third album consisted of 11 tracks. For this album, only three songs on the album were covers: Norma Jean's "Jackson Ain't a Very Big Town", Johnnie Ray's "Cry" and Bobbie Gentry's "Ode to Billie Joe". Sherrill envisioned Wynette performing "Cry" as a spoken recitation, but she disagreed. The remaining eight tracks were new recordings. Three of these songs were penned by both Billy Sherrill and Glenn Sutton: "I Don't Wanna Play House", "Take Me to Your World" and "Good". Other new songs included "It's My Way", "Broadminded", "The Phone Call", "Fuzzy Wuzzy Ego" and "(Or) Is It Love".

== Release and reception ==
Take Me to Your World / I Don't Wanna Play House was originally released by Epic Records in January 1968. It was the third studio album in Wynette's career. It was first distributed as a vinyl LP, containing six tracks on "side A" and five tracks on "side B". In 1998, eOne and Koch Records re-released the album as a compact disc. On June 2, 2017 it was re-released digitally and was made available as a music download and for streaming. Following its original release, Billboard magazine gave the album a positive response, calling Wynette an "exceptional young artist". The magazine highlighted tracks such as "Broadminded" and "Cry", calling them "good cuts". Years later, Richie Unterberger of AllMusic rated the album four out of five stars. "Built around the two big hits comprising the title, Take Me to Your World/I Don't Wanna Play House was a strong outing from Tammy Wynette, sensitively and sparely produced by Billy Sherrill," he said.

Following its original release, the album peaked at number three on the Billboard Country LP's chart. Two singles were included on the project that had been released one year prior. Its first was "I Don't Wanna Play House", which Epic issued in July 1967. By October 1967, the single reached number one on the American Billboard Hot Country Songs chart. It was Wynette's second number one single, but her first number one as a solo artist. In December 1967, "Take Me to Your World" was issued as a single. It became Wynette's third number one single on the Billboard Hot Country Songs chart, peaking in the position in March 1968. Both singles also became Wynette's first to enter Canada's RPM country chart. "Take Me to Your World" topped the chart while "I Don't Wanna Play House" reached number three.

== Track listings ==
=== Vinyl version ===
Side one
No.	Title	Writer(s)	Length
1.	"I Don't Wanna Play House"	Billy Sherrill; Glenn Sutton	3:25
2.	"Jackson Ain't a Very Big Town"	Vic McAlpin	2:35
3.	"Broadminded"	Jimmy Payne; Leona Williams	2:12
4.	"Cry"	Churchill Kohlman	2:44
5.	"The Phone Call"	Norris Wilson	1:55
6.	"It's My Way"	Webb Pierce; Wayne Walker	2:20

Side two
No.	Title	Writer(s)	Length
1.	"Take Me to Your World"	Sherrill; Sutton	2:45
2.	"(Or) Is It Love"	Ray Buzzeo	2:28
3.	"Fuzzy Wuzzy Ego"	Hank Mills	2:16
4.	"Good"	Sherrill; Sutton	2:21
5.	"Ode to Billie Joe"	Bobbie Gentry	4:14

=== CD and digitial versions ===
Take Me to Your World / I Don't Wanna Play House
No.	Title	Writer(s)	Length
1.	"I Don't Wanna Play House"	Sherrill; Sutton	2:38
2.	"Jackson Ain't a Very Big Town"	McAlpin	2:39
3.	"Broadminded"	Payne; Williams	2:16
4.	"Cry"	Kohlman	2:49
5.	"The Phone Call"	Wilson	1:59
6.	"It's My Way"	Pierce; Walker	2:24
7.	"Take Me to Your World"	Sherrill; Sutton	2:50
8.	"(Or) Is It Love"	Buzzeo	2:33
9.	"Fuzzy Wuzzy Ego"	Mills	2:19
10.	"Good"	Sherrill; Sutton	2:25
11.	"Ode to Billie Joe"	Gentry	4:19

== Personnel ==
All credits are adapted from the original liner notes of Take Me to Your World / I Don't Wanna Play House and the re-issued version of the album in 1998.

Technical personnel

- Laura Cantrell – Liner notes (1998)
- Barry Feldman – Reissued producer
- Kerin J. Kolonoskie – Reissued cover design (1998)
- Michael Mendel – Cover design
- Dave Nives – Reissued producer (1998)
- Billy Sherrill – Producer
- Tom Sparkman – Engineer

== Chart performance ==
Chart (1968)	Peak position
US Top Country Albums (Billboard)	3

== Release history ==
Region	Date	Format	Label	Ref.
North America	January 1968	Vinyl	Epic Records	
North America	February 17, 1998	Compact disc	eOne; Koch Records	
North America	June 2, 2017	Music download; streaming	Sony Music	
