= The George Jones Story =

Studio album by George Jones
- Released: 1968
- Genre: Country
- Label: Musicor
- Producer: Pappy Daily

George Jones chronology
If My Heart Had Windows (1968)	The George Jones Story (1968)	My Country (1968)

The George Jones Story is a double album by George Jones. It was released on the Musicor label in 1968.

== Track listing ==
=== Record Number One ===
Unless notated, songs were not previously released on prior albums.

No.	Title	Writer(s)	Original album	Length
1.	"Am I That Easy To Forget"	Carl Belew, W.S. Stevenson	Walk Through This World With Me	2:04
2.	"I Threw Away The Rose"	Merle Haggard		2:55
3.	"Back In Baby's Arms Again"	Dallas Frazier, A. L. Owens	We Found Heaven Right Here on Earth at "4033"	2:00
4.	"Run 'Em Off"	Tony Lee, Onie Wheeler		1:51
5.	"The Man That You Once Knew"	Dallas Frazier	I Can't Get There From Here	2:00
6.	"Seasons of My Heart"	George Jones, Darrell Edwards	Grand Ole Opry's New Star	2:51
7.	"Lonely Street"	Carl Belew, W.S. Stevenson, Kenny Snowder	Walk Through This World With Me	2:05
8.	"Ruby Don't Take Your Guns to Town"	Mel Tillis		2:26
9.	"Soldier's Last Letter"	Ernest Tubb, Redd Stewart		3:18
10.	"Ain't Nothin' Shakin' (But the Trees")"	Dallas Frazier, A. L. Owens		2:05

=== Record Number Two ===
Unless notated, songs were not previously released on prior albums.

No.	Title	Writer(s)	Original album	Length
1.	"Green, Green Grass of Home"	Curly Putman		2:37
2.	"That Heart Belongs To Me"	Webb Pierce	Walk Through This World With Me	3:04
3.	"I'll Sail My Ship"	Bernard, Burns, Mann, Thurston		2:22
4.	"Please Don't Let That Woman Get Me"	Dallas Frazier	We Found Heaven Right Here on Earth at "4033"	2:06
5.	"Worst of Luck"	Leon Payne	Mr. Country and Western	2:34
6.	"Color of the Blues"	Jones, Lawton Williams		2:51
7.	"Even the Bad Times Are Good"	Carl Belew	Mr. Country and Western	2:35
8.	"The Shoe Goes On The Other Foot Tonight"	Buddy Mize	Walk Through This World With Me	2:34
9.	"Swinging Doors"	Merle Haggard		2:26
10.	"Your Steppin' Stone"	Bozo Darnell, Major Luper	We Found Heaven Right Here on Earth at "4033"	3:02

== Chart performance ==
Chart (1968)	Peak position
US Top Country Albums (Billboard)	18
