= My Country (album) =

Studio album by George Jones
- Released: 1968
- Genre: Country
- Length: 48:35
- Label: Musicor
- Producer: Pappy Daily

George Jones chronology
The George Jones Story (1968)	My Country (1968)	I'll Share My World with You (1969)

Singles from My Country
- 1. "As Long as I Live" Released: June 16, 1968

My Country is a double album by George Jones. It was released on the Musicor label in 1968 and includes earlier Musicor works.

== Track listing ==
=== Record Number One ===
No.	Title	Writer(s)	Original album	Length
1.	"How Proud I Would Have Been"	Joe Poovey	Mr. Country and Western Music	2:41
2.	"Green Grass Grows All Around"			1:50
3.	"I'm Wasting Good Paper"	Earl Montgomery		2:33
4.	"Tell Me Something I Don't Know"	Jimmy Peppers		2:28
5.	"Let a Little Lovin' Come In"	Leon Payne	Mr. Country and Western Music	2:20
6.	"Beneath Still Waters"	Dallas Frazier, Charles Rains		2:39
7.	"My Favorite Lies"	George Jones, Jack Ripley	George Jones and Gene Pitney (Recorded in Nashville!)	2:37
8.	"New Man in Town"	Sanger D. Shafer		2:34
9.	"How Wonderful A Poor Man's Life Can Be"	Montgomery		2:18
10.	"I Stopped Living Yesterday"	Frazier		2:22

=== Record Number Two ===
No.	Title	Writer(s)	Original album	Length
1.	"As Long as I Live"	Roy Acuff	George Jones and Gene Pitney (Recorded in Nashville!)	2:30
2.	"Let It Rain, Let It Shine"	Frazier		2:10
3.	"Developing My Pictures"	Montgomery		2:17
4.	""I Can't Go Home"	Gene Crysler		2:38
5.	"Blue Side of Lonesome"	Payne	Love Bug	2:46
6.	"Even the Loser Likes to Dream"	Frazier		2:19
7.	"Small Time Laboring Man"	Jones, Montgomery	Cup of Loneliness	2:35
8.	"Mansion on the Hill"	Hank Williams, Fred Rose	My Favorites of Hank Williams	2:27
9.	"Till I Hear It from You"	Jones, Ripley	Country Heart	2:31
10.	"The Stranger's Me"	Frazier	If My Heart Had Windows	2:00

== Chart performance ==
Chart (1968)	Peak position
US Top Country Albums (Billboard)	36
