= Hey Little One (song) =

Single by Glen Campbell

from the album By the Time I Get to Phoenix
- B-side: "My Baby's Gone"
- Released: January 1968
- Recorded: August 29, 1967
- Studio: Capitol, Hollywood
- Genre: Country
- Length: 2:32
- Label: Capitol
- Songwriters: Dorsey Burnette, Barry De Vorzon
- Producer: Al DeLory

Glen Campbell singles chronology
"By the Time I Get to Phoenix" (1967)	"Hey Little One" (1968)	"I Wanna Live" (1968)

"Hey Little One", a song written by Dorsey Burnette and Barry De Vorzon, was initially recorded by Dorsey, released on May 2, 1960 on the Era label as the double A-side "Hey Little One"/"Big Rock Candy Mountain" (Era 3019). "Hey Little One" reached number 48 on the Billboard Hot 100 chart. Musicians on the recording include veteran session drummer Earl Palmer.

== Glen Campbell version ==
American country-pop music artist Glen Campbell covered the song for his Grammy-winning 1967 LP By the Time I Get to Phoenix and released it as the second single from the album. Campbell's more grandiose version reached number 13 on Billboard's Hot Country Singles chart and in February 1968 peaked at 54 on the Hot 100. The single also reached the Top Ten on the RPM Country Tracks chart in Canada. Campbell's follow-up LP Hey Little One, released in March 1968 just four months after its predecessor, also featured the track.

=== Chart performance ===
Chart (1968)	Peak position
US Hot Country Songs (Billboard)	13
US Billboard Hot 100	54
US Billboard Easy Listening	20
Canadian RPM Country Tracks	2
