= As Long as I Live (George Jones song) =

Single by George Jones

from the album My Country
- B-side: "Your Angel Steps Out of Heaven"
- Released: 1968
- Recorded: 1968
- Genre: Country
- Length: 2:32
- Label: Musicor
- Songwriter(s): Roy Acuff
- Producer(s): Pappy Daily

George Jones singles chronology
"Small Town Laboring Man" (1968)	"As Long as I Live" (1968)	"Milwaukee (Here I Come)" (1968)

"As Long as I Live" is a song by George Jones. It reached #3 on the Billboard country singles chart when it was released as a single on the Musicor label in 1968. An oath of love and devotion, the ballad is similar to Jones' 1967 #1 hit "Walk Through This World with Me," with a strikingly similar guitar introduction. The song was written by Roy Acuff, whose songs, many of which echoed the haunting melodies and spooky atmosphere of the old sacred hymns and Elizabethan and mountain-style ballads, had a profound impact on Jones as a child. In a 2006 interview with Ray Waddell of Billboard, Jones stated, "I loved Roy Acuff with all my heart, and I never dreamed I'd be able to meet him or see him onstage, or especially become good friends with him."

The song was originally recorded by the Bailes Brothers in 1946.
