= Country Hall of Fame (1968 album) =

Studio album by Hank Locklin
- Released: February 1968
- Recorded: November 1967
- Studio: RCA Victor Studio
- Genre: Country; Nashville Sound
- Label: RCA Victor
- Producer: Chet Atkins; Felton Jarvis

Hank Locklin chronology
Nashville Women (1967)	Country Hall of Fame (1968)	My Love Song for You (1968)

Singles from Country Hall of Fame
- 1. "The Country Hall of Fame" Released: September 1967

Country Hall of Fame is a studio album by American country singer–songwriter Hank Locklin. It was released in February 1968 via RCA Victor Records and contained 12 tracks. The album was co-produced by Chet Atkins and Felton Jarvis. The album's name was derived from its single of the same, which became Locklin's first major hit in several years. It would also be his seventeenth studio recording released in his career and one of many to be produced by Chet Atkins. Country Hall of Fame received positive reviews from writers and publications.

== Background and content ==
Hank Locklin had not had a major hit single since the early 1960s when songs like "Please Help Me, I'm Falling" reached the top of the country charts. Yet, he continued releasing studio albums, other top 40 hits and toured. In 1968, Locklin's single that paid tribute to the Country Music Hall of Fame and Museum became his first to reach the top ten in many years. Its success prompted the recording (and release) of a studio album of the same name.

The album was a collection of 12 tracks. Despite being a songwriter as well, none of the album's material was composed by Locklin. Instead, it featured songs first recorded by other artists and songs written by other composers. Included was covers like Hank Williams' "Lovesick Blues," Jim Reeves' "Four Walls" and "High Noon." All of the album's songs paid homage to country artists (mostly whom Locklin was influenced by) who been inducted into the Country Music Hall of Fame and Museum. The project was recorded in November 1967 at the RCA Victor Nashville Sound Studio, located in Nashville, Tennessee. The sessions were co-produced by Chet Atkins (Locklin's producer of many years) and Felton Jarvis.

== Release and reception ==
Professional ratings
Review scores
Source	Rating
Allmusic	4.5/5 stars
Billboard	Favorable

The album's release was preceded by its title track, which was first released as a single in September 1967. Spending 20 weeks on the Billboard Hot Country Songs chart, the single would climb to number eight in January 1968. The title track brought Locklin's his first top ten hit since 1962's "Happy Journey," prompting the release of the studio album. The album was first released in February 1968 on RCA Victor Records. It would mark Locklin's seventeenth studio album. It was originally distributed as a vinyl LP, containing six songs on each side. Several decades later, it was re-released in a digital format to online music stores such as Apple Music.

Country Hall of Fame entered the Billboard Top Country Albums chart following its release and spent a total of 20 weeks there. By April of that year, it reached a peak of 20. It would be Locklin's highest-charting Billboard album. Following its original release, the record received positive responses from music publications and critics. Billboard magazine responded positively to it in their March 1968 issue. They highlighted the album's covers of various country songs, but called its title track "the key song of the LP." Thom Owens of Allmusic would later rate the album four and a half stars. "It's a very entertaining and even moving record, and it ranks as one of his best albums of the late '60s," he commented.

== Track listings ==
=== Vinyl version ===
Side one
No.	Title	Writer(s)	Original artist(s)	Length
1.	"High Noon (Do Not Forsake Me)"	Dimitri Tiomkin; Ned Washington	Tex Ritter	2:49
2.	"Four Walls"	George Campbell; Marvin Moore	Jim Reeves	2:36
3.	"The Country Hall of Fame"	Karl Davis	Hank Locklin	3:07
4.	"I'll Hold You in My Heart (Till I Can Hold You in My Arms)"	Eddy Arnold; Tommy Dilbeck; Hal Horton	Eddy Arnold	2:15
5.	"Walking the Floor Over You"	Ernest Tubb	Ernest Tubb	2:50
6.	"Lovesick Blues"	Cliff Friend; Irving Mills	Hank Williams	3:09

Side two
No.	Title	Writer(s)	Original artist(s)	Length
1.	"Night Train to Memphis"	Harry Beasley Smith; Owen Bradley; Marvin Hughes	Roy Acuff	1:44
2.	"Signed Sealed and Delivered"	Cowboy Copas; Lois Mann	Cowboy Copas	3:03
3.	"No One Will Ever Know"	Fred Rose; Mel Forre	Hank Williams	3:37
4.	"Blue Yodel ("T For Texas")"	Jimmie Rodgers	Jimmie Rodgers	2:07
5.	"When I Stop Dreaming"	Charlie Louvin; Ira Louvin	The Louvin Brothers	2:30
6.	"Peace in the Valley"	Thomas A. Dorsey	Red Foley	3:20

=== Digital version ===
Country Hall of Fame
No.	Title	Writer(s)	Original artist(s)	Length
1.	"High Noon (Do Not Forsake Me)"	Tiomkin; Washington	Tex Ritter	2:55
2.	"Four Walls"	Campbell; Moore	Jim Reeves	2:44
3.	"The Country Hall of Fame"	Davis	Hank Locklin	3:15
4.	"I'll Hold You in My Heart"	Arnold; Dilbeck; Horton	Eddy Arnold	2:20
5.	"Walking the Floor Over You"	Ernest Tubb	Ernest Tubb	2:56
6.	"Lovesick Blues"	Friend; Mills	Hank Williams	3:19
7.	"Night Train to Memphis"	Beasley Smith; Bradley; Hughes	Roy Acuff	1:44
8.	"Signed Sealed and Delivered"	Copas; Mann	Cowboy Copas	3:08
9.	"No One Will Ever Know"	Rose; Forre	Hank Williams	3:45
10.	"Blue Yodel ("T For Texas")"	Rodgers	Jimmie Rodgers	2:12
11.	"When I Stop Dreaming"	C. Louvin; I. Louvin	The Louvin Brothers	2:37
12.	"Peace in the Valley"	Dorsey	Red Foley	3:24

== Personnel ==
All credits are adapted from the liner notes of Country Hall of Fame.

Musical personnel

- The A Strings – string section
- Chet Atkins – guitar
- Harold Bradley – guitar
- Jerry Carrigan – drums
- Floyd Cramer – piano
- Ray Edenton – guitar
- The Jordanaires – background vocals
- Hank Locklin – lead vocals
- Grady Martin – guitar
- Wayne Moss – guitar
- The Nashville Edition – background vocals
- Jerry Reed – guitar
- Hargus "Pig" Robbins – piano
- Jerry Smith – piano
- Pete Wade – guitar
- Bill Walker – vibes

Technical personnel

- Chet Atkins – producer
- Felton Jarvis – producer
- Bill McElhiney – arrangements

== Chart performance ==
Chart (1968)	Peak position
US Top Country Albums (Billboard)	20

== Release history ==
Region	Date	Format	Label	Ref.
Canada	February 1968	Vinyl	RCA Victor	
Germany	February 1968	Vinyl	RCA Victor	
United Kingdom	February 1968	Vinyl	RCA Victor	
United States	February 1968	Vinyl	RCA Victor	
United States	2010s	Digital; Streaming	Sony Music Entertainment	
