= I Just Came to Get My Baby =

Single by Faron Young

from the album Here's Faron Young
- B-side: "Missing You Was All I Did Today"
- Released: July 1968
- Genre: Country
- Label: Mercury
- Songwriter(s): Wayne Kemp

Faron Young singles chronology
"She Went a Little Bit Farther" (1968)	"I Just Came to Get My Baby" (1968)	"I've Got Precious Memories" (1969)

"I Just Came to Get My Baby" is a single by American country music artist Faron Young. Released in July 1968, it was the second single from his album Here's Faron Young. The song peaked at number 8 on the Billboard Hot Country Singles chart. It also reached number 1 on the RPM Country Tracks chart in Canada.

== Chart performance ==
Chart (1968)	Peak position
U.S. Billboard Hot Country Singles	8
Canadian RPM Country Tracks	1
