= The Country Hall of Fame – Patsy Cline =

The Country Hall of Fame

Greatest hits album by Patsy Cline
- Released: 1979
- Recorded: November 16, 1960 – February 7, 1963
- Genre: Country, traditional pop
- Label: MCA

Patsy Cline chronology
Always (1969)	The Country Hall of Fame (1979)	Always (1980)

The Country Hall of Fame is a 1979 compilation album consisting of the popular hit singles by country music singer and Country Music Hall of Fame inductee, Patsy Cline. It was released on MCA Records.

The Country Hall of Fame was released six years after Patsy Cline had been inducted into the Country Music Hall of Fame. It contained some of her biggest hit singles from the Decca Records label, such as "I Fall to Pieces," "Crazy," and "She's Got You." It also contained some less familiar song, such as "Anytime," "He Called Me Baby," and "When You Need a Laugh." The album contains sixteen tracks with eight tracks on each side of the record.

The record's mixing/mastering process muted the sound of some instruments or eliminated them altogether. The album was released to the United Kingdom by MCA Records Ltd. and the album was manufactured and distributed by CBS Records. In 1985, the album was reissued and retitled as, Golden Greats.

== Track listing ==
Side 1:

1. "Walkin' After Midnight" — 2:32
2. "I Fall to Pieces" — 2:47
3. "Crazy" — 2:41
4. "Who Can I Count on" — 2:13
5. "She's Got You" — 2:58
6. "Strange" — 2:09
7. "When I Get Thru with You (You'll Love Me Too)" — 2:35
8. "Imagine That" — 2:51

Side 2:

1. "So Wrong" — 2:59
2. "Heartaches" — 2:08
3. "Leavin' on Your Mind" — 2:24
4. "Sweet Dreams (Of You)" — 2:32
5. "Faded Love" — 3:41
6. "When You Need a Laugh" — 2:47
7. "He Called Me Baby" — 2:38
8. "Anytime" — 1:55
