= Next in Line (Conway Twitty song) =

Single by Conway Twitty

from the album Next in Line
- B-side: "I'm Checking Out"
- Released: August 5, 1968
- Recorded: June 22, 1968
- Studio: Columbia (Nashville, Tennessee)
- Genre: Country
- Length: 2:51
- Label: Decca
- Songwriter(s): Wayne Kemp; Curtis Wayne
- Producer(s): Owen Bradley

Conway Twitty singles chronology
"The Image of Me" (1968)	"Next in Line" (1968)	"Darling You Know I Wouldn't Lie" (1968)

"Next in Line" is a song written by Wayne Kemp and Curtis Wayne, and recorded by American country music artist Conway Twitty. It was released in August 1968 as the first single and title track from the album Next in Line. The song was Twitty's sixth entry to make the country charts and his first of 54 number ones on all the country charts. His 2nd number one overall ("It's Only Make Believe" went to number one in 1958 on the Pop charts.) The single spent a single week at number one and spent a total of 13 weeks within the top 40.

== Personnel ==
- Conway Twitty — lead vocals
- Joe E. Lewis, The Jordanaires — background vocals
- Ray Edenton — acoustic guitar
- John Hughey — steel guitar
- Tommy "Porkchop" Markham — drums and percussion
- Norbert Putnam — bass
- Hargus "Pig" Robbins — piano
- Jerry Shook — six-string bass guitar
- Herman Wade — electric guitar

== Chart performance ==
Chart (1968)	Peak position
US Hot Country Songs (Billboard)	1
Canadian RPM Country Tracks	2
