= Dreams of the Everyday Housewife =

1968 single by Glen Campbell

Single by Glen Campbell

from the album Wichita Lineman
- B-side: "Kelli Hoedown"
- Released: July 1968
- Recorded: April 15 and May 10, 1968
- Studio: Capitol (Hollywood)
- Genre: Country
- Length: 2:34
- Label: Capitol
- Songwriter(s): Chris Gantry
- Producer(s): Al DeLory

Glen Campbell singles chronology
"I Wanna Live" (1968)	"Dreams of the Everyday Housewife" (1968)	"Gentle on My Mind" (1968)

"Dreams of the Everyday Housewife" is a song written by Chris Gantry and recorded by American country music artist Glen Campbell. It was released in July 1968 as the first single from his album Wichita Lineman. The song peaked at number 3 on the Billboard Hot Country Singles chart. It also reached number 1 on the RPM Country Tracks chart in Canada.

== Chart performance ==
=== Glen Campbell ===
Chart (1968)	Peak position
US Hot Country Songs (Billboard)	3
US Billboard Hot 100	32
U.S. Billboard Easy Listening	6
Canadian RPM Country Tracks	1
Canadian RPM Top Singles	25

=== Wayne Newton ===
Wayne Newton recorded the first version of the song (June 1968) which reached number 14 on the Easy Listening chart.

Chart (1968)	Peak position
US Billboard Hot 100	60
U.S. Billboard Easy Listening	14
Canadian RPM Top Singles	28

== Other recordings ==
- Gary Puckett & The Union Gap released a cover version on their album Young Girl.
- Mike Minor also performed the song on episode 184 of Petticoat Junction, "The Ballad of the Everyday Housewife". The show first aired on January 4, 1969.
