= Heaven Says Hello =

Single by Sonny James

from the album Heaven Says Hello
- B-side: "Fairy Tales"
- Released: May 1968
- Genre: Country
- Label: Capitol
- Songwriter(s): Cindy Walker
- Producer(s): Kelso Herston

Sonny James singles chronology
| "A World of Our Own" (1968) | "Heaven Says Hello" (1968) | "Born to Be with You" (1968) |

"Heaven Says Hello" is an April 1968 single by Sonny James. "Heaven Says Hello" went to number one on the country charts for one week, and spent a total of sixteen weeks on the chart.

== Chart performance ==
| Chart (1968) | Peak position |
|---|---|
| U.S. Billboard Hot Country Singles | 1 |
| Canadian RPM Country Tracks | 26 |

== Cover Versions ==
- Later in 1968,Slim Whitman recorded the song.
