= Say It's Not You =

Single by George Jones

from the album If My Heart Had Windows
- B-side: "The Poor Chinee"
- Released: 1968
- Recorded: 1967
- Genre: Country
- Length: 2:30
- Label: Musicor
- Songwriter(s): Dallas Frazier
- Producer(s): Pappy Daily

George Jones singles chronology
"If My Heart Had Windows" (1967)	"Say It's Not You" (1968)	"Small Town Laboring Man" (1968)

"Say It's Not You" is a song by American country singer George Jones. It was written by Dallas Frazier.

== Background ==
Musicor released "Say It's Not You" as a single in 1968. The song, a ballad in which a man confronts his adulterous lover, reached #8 on the country Billboard charts. During his time with Musicor, Jones would record at a furious pace, cutting over 280 singles, and remained a constant presence on the country charts. However, the hastily produced sessions, combined with the sloppy LP packages that were issued under his name, left some with the impression that Musicor was not taking as much time as it should with Jones, who was by far its top country star. Although the quality control was not always what it should have been, Jones singing was stellar, and songs like "Say It's Not You" would heavily influence Gram Parsons, who would be a key figure in the creation of the country-rock genre.

== Keith Richards version ==
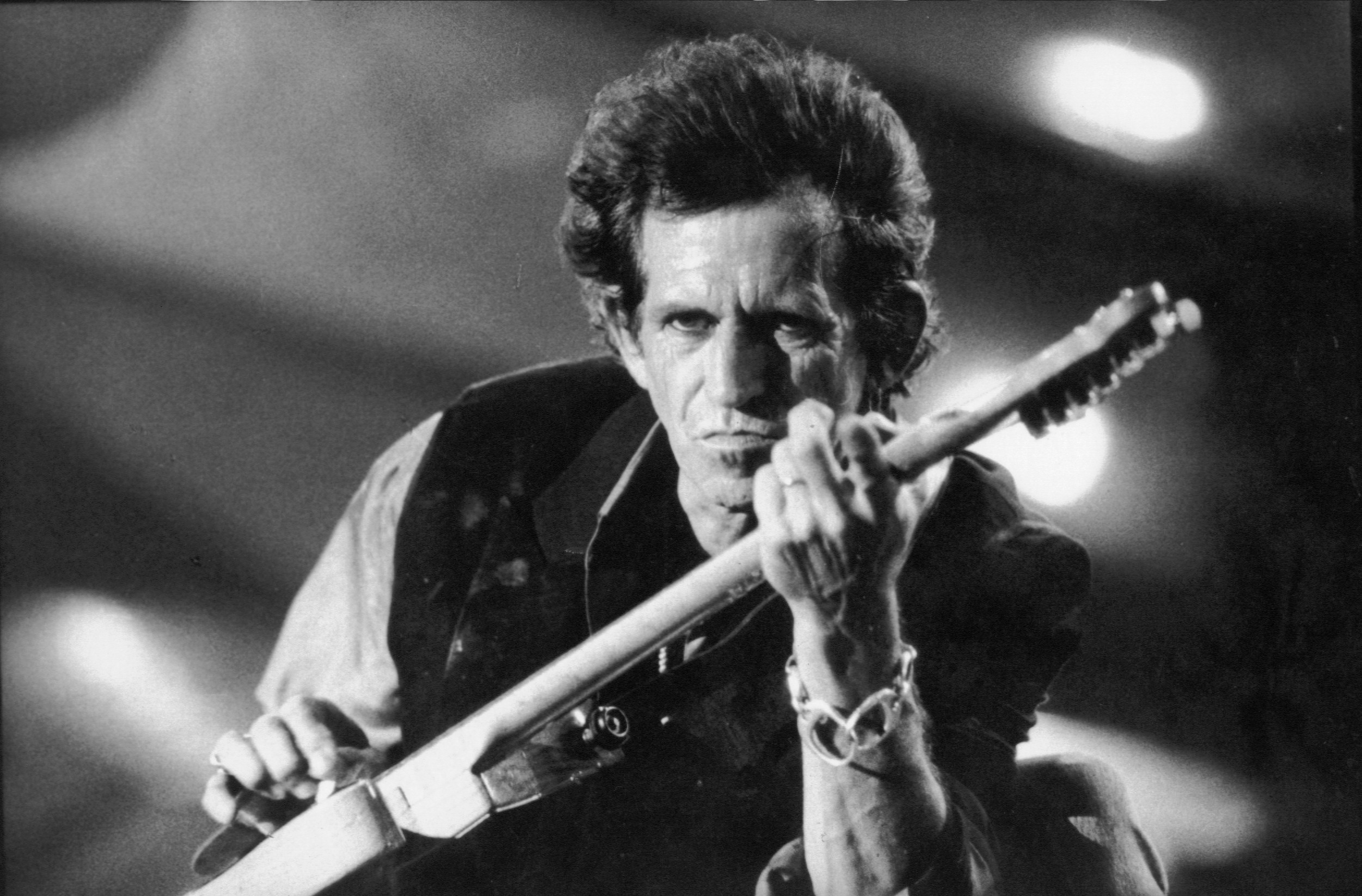
Richards, Rolling Stones Voodoo Lounge World Tour, Rio de Janeiro, Brazil, 1995.

Jones would record "Say It's Not You" as a duet with Rolling Stones guitarist Keith Richards in 1994, with the guitarist writing in his memoir Life that country-rock pioneer and Jones fan Gram Parsons first made him aware of the song: "Gram taught me country music - how it worked, the difference between the Bakersfield style and the Nashville style...Some of the seeds he planted in the country music area are still with me, which is why I can record a duet with George Jones with no compunction at all." Richards also recalls first crossing paths with the country singer when the Rolling Stones and Jones were on the same show in Texas in 1964: "They trailed in with tumbleweed following them, as if tumbleweed was their pet. Dust all over the place, a bunch of cowboys. But when George got up, we went whoa, there's a master up there." "Say It's Not You" remained a special song for Richards, who performed it along with several other sad country songs at a piano during his drug trial for heroin possession in Toronto in 1977 (a bootleg, recorded at a time when the guitarist's future remained quite cloudy, was eventually released as KR's Toronto Bootleg). After they finally recorded the song together at Bradley's Barn, both men praised each other effusively, with Jones calling Richards "the world's greatest rock 'n' roll guitarist" in his autobiography and confessing to Chuck Dean of Rolling Stone in 1996, "I'll be honest with you: I love Keith Richards more than anything as a person. He's a character – just fun to be around." In his own autobiography Richards recalled, "George was a great guy to work with, especially when he had the hairdo going. Incredible singer."
