= It's All Over (David Houston and Tammy Wynette song) =

Single by David Houston and Tammy Wynette

from the album My Elusive Dreams
- B-side: "Send Me No Roses"
- Released: January 1968
- Recorded: June 21, 1967
- Studio: Columbia (Nashville, Tennessee)
- Genre: Country
- Length: 2:30
- Label: Epic
- Songwriter(s): Billy Sherrill; Glenn Sutton
- Producer(s): Billy Sherrill

"It's All Over" is a song written by Billy Sherrill and Glenn Sutton. It was originally recorded by American country artists David Houston and Tammy Wynette. It was released as a single in 1968.

== Background and reception ==
"It's All Over" was first recorded on June 21, 1967 in the Columbia Recording Studios in Nashville, Tennessee. Additional tracks between the pair were also recorded during this session. The session was produced by Billy Sherrill.

The song reached number 11 on the Billboard Hot Country Singles chart in 1968. It became the pair's second and final major hit as a duet partnership. It was also released on their only studio album together entitled My Elusive Dreams.

== Track listings ==
7" vinyl single

- "It's All Over"
- "Together We Stand (Divided We Fall)"

== Charts ==
=== Weekly charts ===
Chart (1968)	Peak position
AUS Top Singles (Kent Music Report)	78
US Hot Country Singles (Billboard)	11
