= Take Me to Your World =

- Dutch release picture sleeve

Single by Tammy Wynette

from the album Take Me to Your World / I Don't Wanna Play House
- B-side: "Good"
- Released: November 1967
- Studio: Columbia (Nashville, Tennessee)
- Genre: Country
- Length: 2:50
- Label: Epic
- Songwriter(s): Billy Sherrill; Glenn Sutton
- Producer(s): Billy Sherrill

Tammy Wynette singles chronology
"I Don't Wanna Play House" (1967)	"Take Me to Your World" (1967)	"D-I-V-O-R-C-E" (1968)

"Take Me to Your World" is a 1968 single written by Billy Sherrill and Glenn Sutton and recorded by Tammy Wynette. "Take Me to Your World" was Tammy Wynette's second number one on the country charts as a solo artist. The single stayed at number one for a single week and spent a total of fourteen weeks on the country chart.

== Chart performance ==
Chart (1967–1968)	Peak position
U.S. Billboard Hot Country Singles	1
Canadian RPM Country Tracks	1

== Other versions ==
- Patti Page included the song on her album Gentle on My Mind (1968)
- Jean Shepard recorded the song for her album A Real Good Woman (1968)
- George Jones recorded the song as "I'll Take You to My World" on his album George Jones (1972)
