= Born to Be with You (song) =

Single by The Chordettes
- B-side: "Love Never Changes"
- Released: June 1956
- Genre: Traditional pop
- Length: 2:46
- Label: Cadence
- Songwriter: Don Robertson

The Chordettes singles chronology
"Eddie My Love" (1956)	"Born to Be with You" (1956)	"Lay Down Your Arms" (1956)

"Born to Be with You" is a song by the American female vocal quartet The Chordettes. Written by Don Robertson, the song was released in 1956. The song reached a position of number five on the pop charts in the United States. In Ireland, Butch Moore & The Capitol Showband took it to No. 1 in 1965.

== Background ==
In the Chordettes version, because of the short verses, the Chordettes hum two choruses in-between the verses, while in the second humming chorus, a whistling of composer Don Robertson, is heard playing a counterpoint melody. Several disc jockeys wrongly fade the song out when the bass guitar plays a rumba rhythm that seems to fade out, however, following a brief pause, the Chordettes sing a harmonic variation Capella of the word "AMEN".

== Cover versions ==
- Don Robertson also recorded this song in 1965.
- In 1968, Sonny James recorded a version of the song which reached number one on the country charts.
- J.D. Crowe recorded the song on his 1978 release Blackjack. It is a bluegrass rendition.
- Bing Crosby recorded the song in 1956 for use on his radio show and it was subsequently included in the box set The Bing Crosby CBS Radio Recordings (1954-56) issued by Mosaic Records (catalog MD7-245) in 2009.
- In 1973, Dave Edmunds had a No. 5 hit in the UK with the song, using his then popular "wall of sound" technique, borrowed from Phil Spector.
- Dion DiMucci recorded the song as the title song of his 1975 Born to Be with You album, the song and much of the album being produced by Phil Spector.
- Steel-string acoustic guitarist Leo Kottke included his rendition of the song on his 1974 album, Ice Water.
- Country singer Sandy Posey released the song in 1978 and it went to No. 21 on the US country chart.
- Anne Murray recorded a version of the song for her album Croonin' (1993).
