= How Long Will My Baby Be Gone =

Single by Buck Owens

from the album Sweet Rosie Jones
- B-side: "Everybody Needs Somebody"
- Released: January 8, 1968
- Genre: Country
- Label: Capitol
- Songwriter(s): Buck Owens
- Producer(s): Ken Nelson

Buck Owens singles chronology
"It Takes People Like You (To Make People Like Me)" (1967)	"How Long Will My Baby Be Gone" (1968)	"Sweet Rosie Jones" (1968)

"How Long Will My Baby Be Gone" is a 1968 song written and recorded by Buck Owens.

== Overview ==
"How Long Will My Baby Be Gone" was the last of eight number ones on the country chart in a row for Buck Owens. The single spent a single week at number one and a total of thirteen weeks on the country chart. The song is still performed at the Country Bear Jamboree attraction at certain Disney parks.

== Chart performance ==
Chart (1968)	Peak position
U.S. Billboard Hot Country Singles	1
Canadian RPM Country Tracks	16
