= Mona Gustafsson =

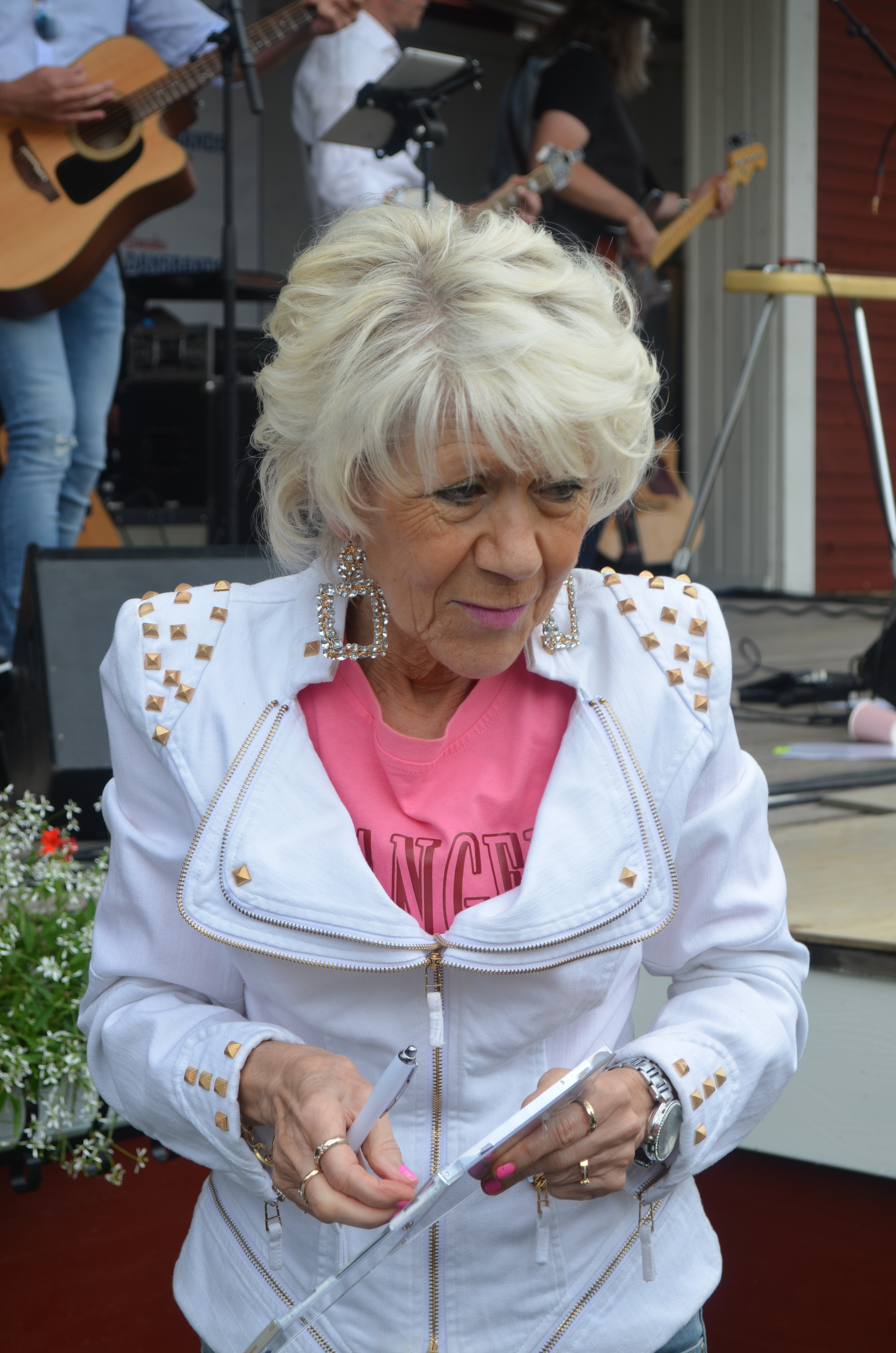
- Mona G in 2023

Background information
- Birth name: Mona Agneta Marianne Gustafsson
- Also known as: Mona G
- Born: August 9, 1956 (age 68); Halmstad, Sweden
- Genres: Country; Dansband music Gammaldans; Rock
- Occupations: Singer; songwriter; guitarist
- Instrument: Guitar
- Years active: 1970–

Mona Agneta Marianne Gustafsson, born 9 August 1956 in Halmstad, Sweden, is a Swedish singer, songwriter and guitarist.

Earlier, she used to sing with Leif Bloms, but as the band was disestablished on 31 December 1995, she established another dansband in 1996, Mona G:s orkester, which was disestablished in January 2009, and she started a country music career. She was nominated as "Female Singer of the Year 2006" by SR P4, and in the Får jag lov magazines Guldklaven voting.

As a 15 years old girl, Mona Gustafsson started to sing with the Lill-Nickes dansband from Halmstad, which was established on 1 May 1972. Other members were her father, Kurt Gustafsson, 44 years old, Sven-Arne Olofsson, 21 years old, and Kapellmeister Dan Larsson, 17 years old. Their first appearance occurred in Värnamo on 14 June 1972. Mona began her career during a talent show at Halmstad Folkets hus in the spring of 1970.

Some years later, she was a founder of another dansband Curt Jürgens.

In the early 1980s, she moved to Växjö, and in 1981, she started touring with Leif Bloms, and when the three Leif, Gert and Åke Blom retired on 31 December 1995, she started her own dansband in 1996.

As a songwriter, she has composed music for both herself and others, one of her most famous songs are Dej ska jag älska all min tid, winner of Hänts meloditävling, in 1992 with Leif Bloms. This was the first and only in the history of the later cancelled competition, when the winning song was written and performed by the same person. She has also written songs for acts like Thorleifs, Curt Haagers, Kikki Danielsson and Sandins. The song Så länge mina ögon ser, originally recorded by Thorleifs on the 1987 album Till Folkets park, was recorded by Mona G:s orkester and released as a solo single in 2007. Several of her songs have been covered by others.

So called "Mona songs" are recognized by calm, ballad-like, songs with lyrics in Swedish about love, longing and missing someone. Writing own songs within a larger scale is rare within the dansband genre.

In the spring of 2020, she observed her 50th anniversary as an artist, but the anniversary ended up cancelled because of the Corona Pandemic.

== Svensktoppen solo songs ==
- En vanlig lördagskväll – 1978
- Georgio – 1980
