= D-I-V-O-R-C-E =

1968 single by Tammy Wynette

Single by Tammy Wynette

from the album D-I-V-O-R-C-E
- B-side: "Almost Persuaded"
- Released: May 1968
- Recorded: March 22, 1968
- Studio: Columbia Studio B (Nashville, Tennessee)
- Genre: Country
- Length: 2:57
- Label: Epic
- Songwriters: Bobby Braddock and Curly Putman
- Producer: Billy Sherrill

Tammy Wynette singles chronology
| "Take Me to Your World" (1968) | "D-I-V-O-R-C-E" (1968) | "Stand by Your Man" (1968) |

"D-I-V-O-R-C-E" is a song written by Bobby Braddock and Curly Putman, and recorded by American country music artist Tammy Wynette. It was released in May 1968 as the first single and title track from the album D-I-V-O-R-C-E. Wynette's version was a number one country hit in 1968 and earned her a Grammy nomination for Best Country Vocal Performance, Female.

== Background ==
Just a year after Wynette scored her first hit with "Your Good Girl's Gonna Go Bad", she had already gained a reputation for catering to the female perspective in country music that, according to country music writer Kurt Wolff, audiences badly craved. Her repertoire already included songs that urged understanding and forgiveness, but critics noted she had also become adept at singing songs of heartbreak. In Wolff's words, "(W)hen the end of the road was reached, she also spoke plainly of the hard issues facing modern-day couples."

Recorded in 1968, "D-I-V-O-R-C-E" is a woman's perspective on the impending collapse of her marriage. The song's title is an old parenting trick of spelling out words mothers and fathers hope their young children will not understand, they (the children) being not yet able to spell or comprehend the word's meaning. In this case, the soon-to-be-divorcee spells out words such as "divorce", "Joe" (the name of the woman's four-year-old son), "hell", and "custody" to shield the young, carefree boy from the cruel, harsh realities of the world surrounding him and the ultimate breakup of his mother and father.

Country music historian Bill Malone wrote that Wynette's own tumultuous life (five marriages) "encompassed the jagged reality so many women have faced." Therefore, he asserts that Wynette identified so well with "D-I-V-O-R-C-E"; her rendition, Malone wrote, is "painfully sincere—there is no irony here—and if there is a soap opera quality to the dialogue, the content well mirrors both her own life and contemporary experience."

Wolff, meanwhile, hailed the song as "tearjerking as any country song before or since. It approaches parody, but stops just short thanks to the sincerity of Tammy's quivering voice."

== Critical reception ==
In 2024, Rolling Stone ranked the song at #59 on its 200 Greatest Country Songs of All Time ranking.

== Chart performance ==
"D-I-V-O-R-C-E" was released in May 1968, and was one of Wynette's fastest-climbing songs to that time. It reached number one on the Billboard Hot Country Singles chart that June, and was also a minor pop hit, stopping at No. 63 on the Billboard Hot 100.

In 1975, a Tammy Wynette greatest hits album was released in the UK. Two of the songs from this album ascended the British pop chart that year, with "Stand by Your Man" reaching the top of the chart in April and "D-I-V-O-R-C-E" climbing to a peak position of No. 12 in July

| Chart (1968) | Peak position |
|---|---|
| US Hot Country Songs (Billboard) | 1 |
| US Billboard Hot 100 | 63 |
| Canadian RPM Country Tracks | 1 |
| Canadian RPM Top Singles | 74 |
| Chart (1975) | Peak position |
| Dutch Top 40 | 9 |
| UK Singles Chart | 12 |

== Parodies ==
Sheb Wooley recorded a spoof version of the song under his Ben Colder pseudonym in 1969 with a dog in place of the little boy in the lyrics and spelt out words such as vet and quarantine. A rendition of this version, sung by Scottish comedian Billy Connolly, was a No. 1 hit in the UK in November 1975.

== In culture ==
Along with three other songs by Wynette, this one was played in the Bob Rafelson film, Five Easy Pieces (1970). The song was also featured in the radio station Rebel Radio in Grand Theft Auto V.
