= You Are My Treasure =

Single by Jack Greene

from the album You Are My Treasure
- B-side: "If God Can Forgive You So Can I"
- Released: February 1968
- Genre: Country
- Label: Decca
- Songwriter(s): Cindy Walker
- Producer(s): Owen Bradley

Jack Greene singles chronology
"What Locks the Door" (1967)	"You Are My Treasure" (1968)	"Love Takes Care of Me" (1968)

"You Are My Treasure" is a 1968 single by Jack Greene; it was Jack Greene's third number one on the country chart. The single spent a single week at number one and a total of 12 weeks on the country chart.

== Chart performance ==
Chart (1968)	Peak position
U.S. Billboard Hot Country Singles	1
Canadian RPM Country Tracks	1
