= Fist City =

- Japanese release picture sleeve

Single by Loretta Lynn

from the album Fist City
- B-side: "Slowly Killing Me"
- Released: 1968
- Recorded: 9 January 1968
- Studio: Bradley's Barn, Mount Juliet, Tennessee
- Genre: Country
- Label: Decca
- Songwriter: Loretta Lynn
- Producer: Owen Bradley

Loretta Lynn singles chronology
"What Kind of a Girl (Do You Think I Am)" (1967)	"Fist City" (1968)	"You've Just Stepped In (From Stepping Out on Me)" (1968)

"Fist City" is a country music song written and recorded by Loretta Lynn, released in 1968. Inspired by her husband's dalliances with other women who pursued him while she was on tour, Lynn wrote the song as a warning for other women to stay away from him if they do not wish to be soundly beaten. It is one of several songs that got Lynn banned from the radio in the 1960s for her controversial themes.

== Composition and reception ==
Lynn wrote "Fist City" in response to a woman who began pursuing her husband, Doolittle, while Lynn was frequently touring in Tennessee. The Lynns' marriage was often tumultuous; he threw her out of the house early in the relationship, ostensibly for her bad cooking. Lynn found out, however, that he was seeing a woman with whom he had been previously involved and blamed Lynn for driving her away. (`Who's that sow a-wallerin' in yer Jeep?')

Lynn wrote a letter to the other woman, who promptly showed it to Doolittle, who confronted Lynn, telling her to stay out of his business and that any love he had for her was gone. Lynn wrote that his statement broke her heart, and the experience eventually led her to write "Fist City" and the similar "You Ain't Woman Enough".

Admitting that she was tenaciously jealous and Doolittle sometimes did not spurn the advances of other women, Lynn penned the song as a warning, later reflecting in her 2001 autobiography, "I've been in a couple of fights in my life. I fight like a woman. I scratch and kick and bite and punch. Women are much meaner than men. So I warned any girl making eyes at Doo then, and I'm still jealous enough to warn 'em today—if you see this cute little old boy near me wearing his cowboy hat, you'd better walk a circle around us if you don't want to go to Fist City."

"Fist City" was Loretta Lynn's second number 1 hit in early 1968. Released under Decca Records, and produced by Owen Bradley, "Fist City" was recorded in late 1967, but not released until early 1968. An album of the same name was also released that was as successful as the single. "Fist City" was the second of 16 number 1 country hits Lynn has had during the course of her career, following "Don't Come Home A' Drinkin' (With Lovin' on Your Mind)" in early 1967.

During one of Lynn's 2016 tour dates at her Ranch which she was unable to attend due to having recent surgery her son (Ernest Ray) and her twin daughters (Patsy and Peggy) performed and when talking about ‘Fist City’ Ernest Ray actually said the woman's name the song was about.

Nathan Rabin at The A.V. Club writes that "Fist City" is the "single greatest song title of all time", justifying the designation by stating,

Lynn grappled with the most important social issues facing our nation, but she did not hesitate to beat a bitch down when the situation called for it. In song and life, Lynn could be a fierce lioness when it came to fighting for her man. As chronicled in Coal Miner's Daughter, she had her hands full trying to tame a hard-drinking womanizer who felt threatened by his wife's incredible success. On "Fist City," for example, Lynn deliciously taunts a silly little thing whose interest in Lynn's husband is destined to earn her a one-way invitation to a beatdown.

== Chart performance ==
Chart (1968)	Peak position
U.S. Billboard Hot Country Singles	1
Canadian RPM Country Tracks	1

== Other versions ==
- Lynn re-recorded "Fist City" and included it in her 2016 release Full Circle
- Eilen Jewell released a version of "Fist City" on her 2010 Loretta Lynn tribute album Butcher Holler.
- Best Coast released a version of "Fist City" on their 2011 iTunes session EP, which was also released on vinyl in a limited edition of 200 copies as Live at East West Studios 2011
- Chapel Hart released the answer song "Welcome to Fist City" in 2023. Prior to her death, Lynn had requested that the group reinterpret her song after seeing them perform "You Can Have Him Jolene" on America's Got Talent.

== Bibliography ==
- Lynn, Loretta, Vecsey, George (2001). Loretta Lynn: Coal Miner's Daughter, Da Capo Press. ISBN 0-306-81037-9
- Lynn, Loretta, Cox, Patsi Bale (2002). Still Woman Enough: A Memoir, Hyperion. ISBN 0-7868-6650-0
