= I Wanna Live =

- German release picture sleeve

Single by Glen Campbell

from the album Hey Little One
- B-side: "That's All That Matters"
- Released: March 1968
- Recorded: January 11, 1968
- Venue: Capitol (Hollywood)
- Genre: Country
- Length: 2:42
- Label: Capitol Nashville
- Songwriter: John D. Loudermilk
- Producer: Al DeLory

Glen Campbell singles chronology
"Hey Little One" (1968)	"I Wanna Live" (1968)	"Dreams of the Everyday Housewife" (1968)

"I Wanna Live" is a song written by John D. Loudermilk and recorded by American country music singer Glen Campbell. It was released in March 1968 as the lead single from the album, Hey Little One. The song was Campbell's sixth release on the country charts and his first of five number ones on the country chart. The song spent three non-consecutive weeks at number one and a total of fifteen weeks on the country charts. The song was also Glen Campbell's third Top 40 release peaking at number thirty-six.

== Chart performance ==
Chart (1968)	Peak position
US Hot Country Songs (Billboard)	1
US Billboard Hot 100	36
US Adult Contemporary (Billboard)	18
Canadian RPM Country Tracks	1
Canadian RPM Top Singles	18

== Cover versions ==
A Swedish cover 1968 "Leva mitt liv" (Live my life) by Svante Thuresson (Metronome – J 45-784). It peaked at #5 on the Swedish best selling chart Kvällstoppen.

"I Wanna Live" was covered by Eddy Raven in 1976 and reached number 87 on the US country chart.
