= Mira Ann Smith =

American songwriter and record label owner (1924–1989)

- Also known as: Myra Smith; Grace Tennessee; Laura Martin
- Born: October 22, 1924; Alexandria, Louisiana, U.S.
- Died: August 29, 1989 (aged 64) Shreveport, Louisiana, U.S.
- Genres: Country; rockabilly; swamp pop; R&B
- Occupations: Musician; songwriter; record label owner; recording engineer
- Instrument: Guitar
- Years active: 1955–1986
- Labels: Ram; Clif; Checker; K Label
- Formerly of: Louisiana Hayride; Margaret Lewis

Mira Ann Smith (often credited as Myra Smith; October 22, 1924 – August 29, 1989) was an American songwriter, music industry pioneer, record label owner, studio engineer, and multi-instrumentalist. In 1955, she founded Royal Audio Music, Inc., (a.k.a. Ram Records) and became one of the first women to own a record company. Her success led some in the music business to dub her "the female Sam Phillips". Smith is most well known for the songs she wrote with singer-songwriter Margaret Lewis, many of which charted on the Billboard Top 10. Smith and Lewis found their greatest songwriting success with singer Jeannie C. Riley, and wrote many of her songs, including "The Girl Most Likely", "Oh Singer", "The Rib", and "There Never Was a Time". In addition, Smith and Lewis wrote hit songs for artists such as Margaret Whiting ("I Almost Called Your Name") and Peggy Scott and Jo Jo Benson ("Soulshake"). Four artists charted on Billboard with the Smith and Lewis song "Reconsider Me": Johnny Adams (1969), Ray Pillow (1969), John Wesly Ryles (1971), and Narvel Felts (1975). Smith received six outstanding achievement awards from Broadcast Music, Inc. (BMI). In 1988, she was inducted into the Southern Songwriters Hall of Fame, and in 1995, Smith was the first woman inducted into the Women in Music Hall of Fame.

== Early life and influences ==
Smith was born in 1926 in Alexandria, Louisiana, to parents George W. Smith and Beulah Martin Smith. Her mother was a seamstress for The Fashion, Inc., a women's clothing company. She grew up attending the local Baptist church. Smith had two older sisters, Kathleen and Birdie Lee, and from an early age, all three were encouraged to play music. Her parents saved their money and bought Smith an expensive Martin guitar on which she quickly became proficient.

In 1955, Smith was elected president of the newly-organized Song Writers Club of Shreveport, which was founded to give young writers the opportunity to introduce their work to the public. The club started with six members.

Smith was greatly inspired by Les Paul, both by his guitar playing and his innovations with multi-track studio recording. When the first Les Paul guitar came on the market, she "had to have" one.

=== Louisiana Hayride ===
Smith was a fan of, and later performed on, the Louisiana Hayride, a live radio show recorded from the city auditorium in Shreveport and broadcast on station KWKH. Smith began to notice many Hayride artists were being offered recording contracts and others were looking for a place to record their music. Smith recognized the opportunity to open her own recording studio.

== Royal Audio Music, Ram Recording Co. ==
In 1955, when Smith was 29, she acquired the building located at 2439 Lakeshore Drive in Shreveport and turned it into the Royal Audio Recording studio. She purchased a single-track Crown tape recorder, a Neumann U 47 microphone, and a Rek-O-Kut acetate disc cutter. Her cousin, Alton Warwick, worked on the carpentry there and attached egg crates to the walls as a soundproofing measure. To publicize her new recording services, she placed ads in the local papers and in Billboard magazine.

== Ram Records ==
In 1955, a short time after opening the studio, Smith started her own record label, Ram Records. Smith discovered that RCA made quality custom pressings for independent labels and began to use their services. She scoured most of Louisiana and east Texas, crossing racial and genre boundaries in her search for talented artists. She recorded musicians performing country, rockabilly, swamp pop, and R&B.

Ram recording artists included Linda Brannon, Margaret Lewis, Roy "Boogie Boy" Perkins, The Lonesome Drifter, Bobby Page and the Riff Raffs, Endom Spires, June Bug Bailey, Sonny ("Golden Boy") Williamson II, Carol Williams, Larry Bamburg, James Heubert Wilson, Charlotte Ray Hunter, and many others. Smith utilized the talents of some of the best musicians in Shreveport, many of whom went on to sign contracts with major labels and become highly respected musicians, including James Burton, Joe Osborn, Dale Hawkins, and Jerry Kennedy.

=== Clif Records ===
In 1957, Smith partnered with Cliff Hagin, and they added Clif Records as a subsidiary record label. Clif Records' first success was with T.V. Slim (Oscar Wills) and his song "Flat Foot Sam" (Clif #103), written by his wife, Clara Wills. When it was reviewed by Billboard on July 7, 1957, the magazine gave it a 65 or less rating. However, Slim had connections with Leonard Chess and was able to get Checker Records to distribute the song across the nation. Under the Checker label (#870), Billboard gave the song a 77 rating. In 2005, Brian Setzer recorded a cover of "Flat Foot Sam" for his album Rockabilly Riot! Live From the Planet. Chico Chism & His Jetanairs also released "Hot Tamales and Bar-B-Que" on the Clif Label.

=== K Label ===
K Label was another Ram subsidiary record label named after Smith's sister, Kathleen. The Lonesome Drifter (Thomas Johnson) and his 1958 single "Eager Boy" b/w "Tear Drop Valley" (K-Records #5812) is considered one of the more significant recordings from this label.

=== Studio struggles ===
As a woman in an almost completely male industry, Smith often found it difficult to find distribution and promotion services. Her cousin, Alton Warwick, was quoted in 1994 as saying, "(Being a woman) did handicap her, as far as people taking her seriously with things like financing. If she had better funding for distribution and promotion, she could've made some of her records really go." Due to her tight budget, she was only able to promote a few singles each year and was often forced to leave quality songs unreleased. Many of Ram's recordings were forgotten and unreleased for decades.

In 1960, Smith opened a new studio on Greenwood Drive, which included a built-in echo unit and separate vocal booths.

On August 27, 1960, the Louisiana Hayride performed its last show. Rock and roll was growing in popularity, and the Shreveport music scene was slowing and changing. As a result, the studio began to struggle. Within a few years, Smith closed her studio and moved to Nashville, Tennessee, along with many other Shreveport musicians.

=== Ram Records catalog release ===
In 1994, London-based Ace Records, a British reissue label which specializes in American roots music, released a 6-CD box set which included many previously unreleased songs from the Ram catalog. Ray Topping, a London native, assembled the collection. He learned about Ram Records in 1969, when he purchased the song "Drop Top" by Roy "Boogie Boy" Perkins. The Ace release received many mentions in the press, including in Billboard magazine. NPR's Alex Chadwick ran a series of interviews about the Ram Records legacy during September and October of 1994.

== Songwriting success ==
In the early 1960s, Smith teamed up with Margaret Lewis to create a songwriting and publishing partnership. Their first success was a hit for David Houston, "Mountain of Love" (1963), which reached No. 2 on the U.S. Country Charts and No. 132 on the U.S. Charts.

In 1966, Smith and Lewis moved their studio to Nashville. They joined the Country Music Association and signed a contract with record producer Shelby Singleton's SSS International Corporation. During an interview with a journalist, Smith and Lewis commented that when looking for songwriting inspiration, they would often go camping in the woods. The pair composed over 100 songs.

In 1966, they wrote a hit song for Margaret Whiting, "I Almost Called Your Name" (1966, London #115), which spent 16 weeks on the Billboard charts and peaked at No. 4 on the Billboard Adult Contemporary chart. Several other artists also recorded "I Almost Called Your Name", including Linda Martell (Plantation, 1970) and Freddy Fender (ABC Dot, 1974).

In 1968, Smith and Lewis wrote four of the songs on Jeannie C. Riley's album Yearbooks and Yesterday (cat# PLP-2), which peaked at No. 9 on the 1969 Billboard Hot Country Albums and included their songs "Girl Most Likely" (No. 6 on Hot Country Songs, No. 55 U.S. Hot 100), and "Yearbooks and Yesterdays" (No. 187 on the Billboard 200).

In 1969, Riley recorded the Smith and Lewis songs "There Never Was a Time" (No. 5 on Hot Country Songs), "The Rib" (No. 32 on Hot Country songs), "Things Go Better With Love" (No. 142 on Billboard 200), and "The Wedding Cake" for her album Things Go Better With Love. (Plantation, #PLP-3). "The Wedding Cake" was also recorded by Connie Francis (MGM, 1969), Connie Smith (RCA Victor, 1969), and Linda Martell (Plantation, 1970). Dolly Parton and Porter Wagoner also recorded a duet of "There Never Was a Time" for their RCA Records album Always, Always (1969). On March 15, 1969, "There Never Was a Time" was included in the Billboard Top 60 Spotlight.

Riley's hit songs "Oh Singer" (No. 4 on Hot Country Songs, No. 74 on U.S. Hot 100) and "Country Girl" (No. 7 on Hot Country, No. 106 on Billboard 200), were also written by Smith and Lewis.

In 1969, Smith and Lewis's song "Reconsider Me" became a hit for R&B singer Johnny Adams. His rendition peaked at No. 8 on the Billboard R&B charts and No. 28 on the Billboard Hot 100. Also in 1969, the song was a hit for country artist Ray Pillow and peaked at No. 38 on the Billboard Country Charts. In 1971, "Reconsider Me" was the title track of John Wesley Ryles's Plantation Records album, hitting No. 39 on the Country Charts. In 1975, Narvel Felts released a cover of "Reconsider Me". His version charted at No. 1 on Canada's RPM Country charts, spent six weeks on the U.S. Charts, and peaked at No. 67 on the Billboard Hot 100. Smith and Lewis also recorded themselves performing this song, but their version wasn't released until 1994, five years after Smith's death. (Ace #CDCHD 495).

Also in 1969, Jo Jo Benson and Peggy Scott recorded the Smith and Lewis song "Soulshake" which peaked at No. 37 on the Billboard U.S. Pop charts and No. 13 on the U.S. R&B charts. Several other artists recorded this song, including Conway Twitty and Loretta Lynn (MCA, 1977), Delaney & Bonnie and Friends (ATCO/Atlantic, 1970), and Bruce Willis (Motown, 1989).

== Awards and recognitions ==
Smith was the recipient of six BMI Awards for her songs "The Girl Most Likely", "Mountain of Love", "Oh Singer", "Reconsider Me", "There Never Was a Time", and "The Wedding Cake".

In 1988, Smith was inducted into the Southern Songwriters Hall of Fame, and in 1995, she was the first woman inducted into the Women in Music Hall of Fame.

== Pseudonyms ==
Smith was a talented guitarist and pianist and her playing can be heard on many Ram releases, though she often used the aliases Grace Tennessee and Laura Martin (writing credits), or changed the spelling of her name to Myra in the song/album credits.

== Death ==
In 1986, Mira wrote and played guitar for her last recording, "Wings Like Eagles". In 1988, she moved back to Shreveport, and in 1989, she died of leukemia. While many sources report her death as September 29, 1989, her obituary in Shreveport's The Times is dated August 29, 1989.

== Songwriting hits ==
| Song | Songwriters | Performing artist | Album | Label | Year | Charts |
|---|---|---|---|---|---|---|
| "I Almost Called Your Name" | Mira Smith & Margaret Lewis | Jewell Hall | I Almost Called Your Name / (Remember Me) I'm the One Who Loves You | MGM | 1963 | |
| "I Almost Called Your Name" | Mira Smith & Margaret Lewis | Margaret Whiting | I Almost Called Your Name / Let's Pretend | London | 1967 | No. 4 Billboard Adult Contemporary Songs |
| "I Almost Called Your Name" | Mira Smith & Margaret Lewis | Johnny Soul | I Almost Called Your Name / Take me Where the Sun Never Shines | SSS International | 1969 | |
| "I Almost Called Your Name" | Mira Smith & Margaret Lewis | Jeannie C. Riley | Country Girl | Plantation | 1970 | No. 25 Top Country Albums |
| "I Almost Called Your Name" | Mira Smith & Margaret Lewis | Linda Martell | Color Me Country | Plantation | 1970 | No. 40 Country Albums chart |
| "I Almost Called Your Name" | Mira Smith & Margaret Lewis | Freddy Fender | Before the Next Teardrop Falls | ABC Dot | 1974 | No. 1 Hot Country Albums, No. 20 Hot 200 LPS |
| "Mountain of Love" | Mira Smith & Margaret Lewis | David Houston | New Voice from Nashville | Columbia | 1963 | No. 2 Top Country Hits |
| "Soulshake" | Mira Smith & Margaret Lewis | Peggy Scott & Jo Jo Benson | Soulshake | SSS International | 1969 | No. 37 on U.S. Pop Charts, No. 13 on R&B charts |
| "Soulshake" | Mira Smith & Margaret Lewis | Delaney & Bonnie and Friends | Soul Shake / Free the People | ATCO/Atlantic | 1970 | No. 43 Billboard Hot 100 |
| "Soulshake" | Mira Smith & Margaret Lewis | Jerry Williams (Sven Erik Fernstrom) | Leader of the Pack | Sonet | 1970 | |
| "Soulshake" | Mira Smith & Margaret Lewis | Conway Twitty & Loretta Lynn | Dynamic Duo | MCA | 1977 | No. 2 on Top Country Albums Chart |
| "Soulshake" | Mira Smith & Margaret Lewis | Bruce Willis | If It Don't Kill You, It Just Make You Stronger | Motown | 1989 | |
| "Soulshake" | Mira Smith & Margaret Lewis | Chus Martinez Y Su Conjunto | Beat, Soul, Pop, Super Hits | Ekipo (Spain) | 1969 | |
| "I Am the Grass" | Mira Smith and Margaret Lewis | Dee Mullins | I Am the Grass / The World I'm Livin' In | SSS International | 1968 | No. 64 Top Country Songs |
| "I Am the Grass" | Mira Smith and Margaret Lewis | Tommy Hancock | I Am the Grass / I've Got to See My Baby | Sandyland | 1970 | |
| "The Girl Most Likely" | Mira Smith and Margaret Lewis | Jeannie C. Riley | The Girl Most Likely / My Scrapbook | Plantations | 1968 | No. 6 Top Country Hits, No. 55 Billboard Hot 100 |
| "There Never Was a Time" | Mira Smith and Margaret Lewis | Jeannie C. Riley | There Never Was a Time / Back to School | Plantation | 1968 | No. 5 Hot Country Songs, No. 77 on Billboard Hot 100 |
| "There Never Was a Time" | Mira Smith and Margaret Lewis | Dolly Parton & Porter Wagoner | Always, Always | RCA | 1969 | No. 5 on Top Country Albums |
| "There Never Was a Time" | Mira Smith and Margaret Lewis | Lawanda Lindsey | Swingin' & Singing My Song | Chart | 1969 | No. 45 U.S. Country Albums |
| "There Never Was a Time" | Mira Smith and Margaret Lewis | Bobby Bare & Skeeter Davis | Your Husband, My Wife | RCA Victor | 1970 | |
| "There Never Was a Time" | Mira Smith and Margaret Lewis | Bobby Bare & Skeeter Davis | More Tunes for Two | RCA International | 1980 | |
| "There Never Was a Time" | Mira Smith and Margaret Lewis | Hank Locklin | There Never Was a Time | Plantation | 1976 | |
| "Reconsider Me" | Mira Smith and Margaret Lewis | Johnny Adams | Reconsider Me / If I Could See You One More Time | SSS International | 1969 | No. 8 R&B Charts, No. 28 Billboard Hot 100 |
| "Reconsider Me" | Mira Smith and Margaret Lewis | Ray Pillow | The Doors of Love / Reconsider Me | Plantation | 1969 | No. 38 Billboard Country Charts |
| "Reconsider Me" | Mira Smith and Margaret Lewis | John Wesley Ryles | Reconsider Me | Plantation | 1977 | No. 39 on Top Country Songs |
| "Reconsider Me" | Mira Smith and Margaret Lewis | Narvel Felts | Reconsider Me / Lonely Teardrops | ABC | 1975 | No. 1 on Canada's RPM charts, No. 2 Hot Country Songs, No. 67 Billboard Hot 100 |
| "Reconsider Me" | Mira Smith and Margaret Lewis | Margaret Lewis & Mira Smith | Lonesome Bluebird | Ace | 1995 | |
| "The Wedding Cake" | Mira Smith and Margaret Lewis | Connie Francis | The Wedding Cake | MGM | 1969 | No. 33 Hot Country Songs |
| "The Wedding Cake" | Mira Smith and Margaret Lewis | Jeannie C. Riley | Things Go Better With Love | Plantation | 1970 | No. 9 Top Country Albums |
| "The Wedding Cake" | Mira Smith and Margaret Lewis | Connie Smith | Back in Baby's Arms | RCA Victor | 1969 | No. 12 Top Country Albums |
| "The Wedding Cake" | Mira Smith and Margaret Lewis | Linda Martell | Color Me Country | Plantation | 1970 | No. 40 Top country Albums |
| "The Rib" | Mira Smith & Margaret Lewis | Jeannie C. Riley | Things Go Better with Love | Plantation | 1969 | No. 32 Hot Country Song, No. 9 Top Country Albums |
| "My Man" | Mira Smith & Margaret Lewis | Jeannie C. Riley | My Man / The Generation Gap | Plantation | 1970 | No. 60 on Top Country Song |
| "Country Girl" | Mira Smith & Margaret Lewis | Jeannie C Riley | Country Girl | Plantation | 1970 | No. 7 Top Country Songs, No. 25 Top Country Albums |
| "Country Girl" | Mira Smith & Margaret Lewis | Lynn Anderson | Stay There 'Til I Get There | Columbia | 1970 | No. 27 Top Country Albums |
| "Country Girl" | Mira Smith & Margaret Lewis | Kitty Wells | Singin' 'em Country | Decca | 1970 | |
| "Oh Singer" | Mira Smith & Margaret Lewis | Jeannie C Riley | Oh Singer / I'll Take What's Left of You | Plantation | 1971 | No. 74 Hot 100, No. 34 Hot Country Songs |
| "Oh Singer" | Mira Smith & Margaret Lewis | Brandi Shearer | Close to Dark | Amoeba | 2007 | |
| "Buffalo Soldier" | David Barnes, Skip Jackson, Mira Smith, Margaret Lewis | The Flamingos | Buffalo Soldier | Polydor | 1970 | No. 28 R&B, No. 86 Hot 100 |
| "Buffalo Soldier" | David Barnes, Skip Jackson, Mira Smith, Margaret Lewis | The Persuasions | Street Corner Symphony | Capitol | 1972 | |
| "Yearbooks and Yesterdays" | Mira Smith and M. Lewis | Jeannie C. Riley | Yearbooks and Yesterdays | Plantation | 1969 | No. 187 Billboard 200 |
