= The Wedding Cake (album) =

Studio album by Connie Francis
- Released: May 1969
- Recorded: December 1966, January 1969, April 1969
- Studio: Columbia Recording Studios, Nashville
- Genres: Country; Pop-Rock; Country-Pop
- Labels: MGM; SE/4637
- Producer: Shelby Singleton

Connie Francis chronology
Connie Francis Sings Bacharach & David (1968)	The Wedding Cake (1969)	Connie Francis Sings the Songs of Les Reed (1969)

Singles from The Wedding Cake
- 1. "Another Page" Released: January 1967; 2. "The Wedding Cake" Released: January 1969; 3. "Gone Like the Wind" Released: May 1969

The Wedding Cake is the forty-first studio album by American singer Connie Francis, released in May 1969 by MGM Records. The project saw her continue recording with producer Shelby Singleton. The Wedding Cake was met with a mostly positive critical reception, but didn't reach the charts.

== Background ==
As her career began to wane in the late 1960s, Connie Francis started experimenting with different record producers but found little success with new styles. In 1969 Francis recorded "The Wedding Cake", a single that saw her work for the first time with American record producer and record label owner Shelby Singleton. It made brief US, Canadian, and Australian chart appearances. For the album Francis would reunite with the same producer, the country songwriting duo Margaret Lewis and Mira Ann Smith, and with Val Valentin, the producer of her 1967 Love, Italian Style album, this time being the director of engineering, like on Connie Francis Sings "For Mama" (1965).

== Recording and content ==
The Wedding Cake was recorded at Columbia Recording Studios, Nashville in April 1969, with the exception of the hit single, with most of the tracks written by Margaret Lewis and Mira Ann Smith at Shelby Singleton's studio, Singleton Sound Studio, located in Nashville, Tennessee. The album contained a total of 11 tracks, with six songs on side one and five on side two. Unlike most of her previous album, The Wedding Cake had no cover songs. "You Know You're Not Forsaken" was cut on December 20, 1966. Other songs from the main 1969 session like "Milk and Honey" and "Lincoln Street Chapel" were not included in the album, although they appeared 12 years later in her I'm Me Again – Silver Anniversary Album album. Billboard stated that the song "The Wedding Cake" is a "Country flavored rhythm item with good lyric line performed to perfection by Miss Francis." The magazine also said that "Gone Like the Wind" is a "folk flavored ballad with a top performance".

== Critical reception ==
Professional ratings
Review scores
Source	Rating
Encyclopedia of Popular Music	3/5 stars
Billboard	Positive (Pick LP)
Cashbox	Positive (Pop Best Bets)
Record World	Positive (Pick Hits)

The Wedding Cake was given a positive critical response following its release. Billboard magazine named the album among its "Pick LP's" in late May 1969, highlighting its commercial and pop aspects. "'The Wedding Cake' has brought Connie Francis back to the singles forefront and it should do the same for her album sales. Working under the aegis of Shelby Singleton, Miss Francis has found new pop strength. The songs are in the country pop groove and are delivered with an overall market appeal.". Cashbox magazine stated that the album was a "fitting addition to Connie Francis' long string of albums", continuing that "The Wedding Cake showcases the lark in a performance of her last single, after which the set is titled, and 10 other tunes. The songstress is at the top of her form all the way through the set and could grab a nice amount of sales and airplay. Her fans will want to latch on to the LP as soon as possible." Record World magazine believed that the album had a head start; "Shelby Singleton has taken Connie under his wing for a while and put her together with some of his songwriters. Connie's already clicked with 'The Wedding Cake' and has 'Gone Like the Wind' headed for charts; so album has a head start." It was given a three-star rating by Encyclopedia of Popular Music as well.

== Release, chart performance and singles ==
The Wedding Cake was released by MGM Records in May 1969 and was the forty-first studio album of her career. It was also her second-to-last album issued by the original MGM. The album was offered as a vinyl LP. Three singles were included on the project, although none of their B-sides appeared on the album. The first was the two year old at that point "Another Page", issued in January 1967. The song only rose to the number 121 position on the US Hot 100 chart in 1967, but was ranked higher in Cashbox, reaching number 98 on their Top 100 Singles chart. Its most successful single was the namesake, "The Wedding Cake", which was issued in January 1969. The song became her final Hot 100 entry. It also made the US Top Country Singles chart, peaking at number 33 and became her second single to chart on the Country charts, with her previous country chart entry being nine years ago. It also went to the number eighty-third position on Canada's RPM Top 100 singles chart around the same period, and peaked at number 16 on their Adult Contemporary chart. "Gone Like the Wind" was also released as a single soon after, and although seeing heavy advertising, didn't chart. The album itself didn't chart on the Billboard Top LPs or on the Top Country LPs.

== Track listing ==
=== Album track listing ===
Side one
No.	Title	Writer(s)	Length
1.	"The Wedding Cake"	Margaret Lewis; Mira Ann Smith	2:37
2.	"My Most Favorite Thing"	Lewis; Smith	2:38
3.	"Wings of My Love"	Lewis; Smith	3:59
4.	"Betty Jo Marshall"	Dexter Shaffer; William Ellis	2:37
5.	"Love Colored Eyes"	Lewis; Smith	2:20
6.	"You Know You're Not Forsaken"	Tom Everett	2:05

Side two
No.	Title	Writer(s)	Length
1.	"Gone Like the Wind"	Lewis; Smith	3:05
2.	"Springtime"	Lewis; Smith	3:08
3.	"What Momma Used To Do"	Bill Way; John Reynolds	2:38
4.	"Blank Colored Pages"	Lewis; Smith	2:38
5.	"Another Page"	Steven William Duboff; Arthur Kornfeld	2:26

=== Not included songs from the sessions ===
No.	Title	Writer(s)	Released on	Length
1.	"Satan Place"	Yip harburg; Harold Arlen	The Wedding Cake (Expanded Edition)	3:18
2.	"Milk and Honey"	Margaret Lewis; Mira Ann Smith	I'm Me Again – Silver Anniversary Album	3:11
3.	"Reuben James"	Barry Etris; Alex Harvey	The Wedding Cake (Expanded Edition)	3:09
4.	"Yearbooks and Yesterday Friends"	Lewis; Smith	The Wedding Cake (Expanded Edition)	3:24
5.	"When Will the Good Apples Fall"	Kenny Young	The Wedding Cake (Expanded Edition)	2:53
6.	"It'll Never Happen Again"	Tim Hardin	The Wedding Cake (Expanded Edition)	2:16
7.	"Lincoln Street Chapel"	Bobby Russell; Buzz Cason	I'm Me Again – Silver Anniversary Album	3:54
8.	"Old Records"	Merle Kilgore; Arthur Thomas	The Wedding Cake (Expanded Edition)	2:22
9.	"Overhill, Underground"	Lewis; Smith	B-side to "The Wedding Cake"	3:22

== Chart performance ==
=== Singles ===
Chart performance for "The Wedding Cake"
Chart (1969)	Peak position
US Billboard Hot 100	91
US Billboard Easy Listening	19
US Billboard Country Singles	33
US Cashbox Top 100 Singles	97
US Record World 100 Top Pops	92
Canada RPM Top 100 Singles	83

Chart performance for "Another Page"
Chart (1967)	Peak position
US Billboard Bubbling Under the Hot 100	121
US Cashbox Top 100 Singles	98
US Record World 100 Top Pops	103

== Release history ==
Release history and formats for The Wedding Cake
Region	Date	Format	Label	Ref.
United States and Canada	May 1969	Vinyl (LP)	MGM	
Canada	May 1969	8-track cartridge	MGM	
Worldwide	September 12, 2025	Digital; streaming	Universal Music Group	

== Personnel ==
=== Music ===
- Jerry Kennedy - guitar/dobro
- Harold Bradley - guitar
- Ray Edenton, Chip Young - rh.guitar
- Bob Moore - bass
- Buddy Harman - drums
- Hargus Pig Robbins - piano/organ
- George Tidwell - trumpet

=== Technical ===
- Producer: Shelby Singleton
- Engineer: Neil Wilburn
- Director of Engineering: Val Valentin

=== Other ===
- Design: Michael Mendel
- Art Direction: Sid Maurer
- Photography by: John Engstead
