= Margaret Lewis (singer-songwriter) =

American singer-songwriter ( (1939–2019))

- Also known as: Maggie Lewis Warwick
- Born: Margaret Ann Lewis; April 30, 1939; Snyder, Texas, U.S.
- Died: March 29, 2019 (aged 79) Shreveport, Louisiana
- Genres: Country, rockabilly
- Occupations: Songwriter, singer

Margaret Ann Lewis (later Margaret Lewis "Maggie" Warwick; April 30, 1939 – March 29, 2019) was an American country music and rockabilly singer-songwriter and music entrepreneur.

== Biography ==
Born Margaret Ann Lewis in Snyder, Texas, she moved with her family early in life to Levelland, Texas, where she grew up singing in the Baptist church choir and listening to rockabilly and rhythm & blues. In high school she formed a band, the Thunderbolts, and they took second place in a talent show in Lubbock in 1957. After some guest appearances on the Louisiana Hayride radio program, she joined the cast in 1958. In Shreveport where the show was based she met Mira Ann Smith (1926–1989), a local guitarist and aspiring songwriter who had her own record label, Ram Records. Through Smith, Lewis and her sister Rose went on to tour with local artist Dale Hawkins and sang backup vocals on some of his Chess Records recordings.

Lewis continued to record on Smith's Ram Records for several years, until the label was closed down in the early 1960s. Lewis and Smith then decided to concentrate on songwriting. Lewis and Smith moved to Nashville and signed a deal with Shelby Singleton to write songs for his SSS International and Plantation Records labels. They wrote a number of hits for various artists from 1967 to 1971, perhaps the best known being "Reconsider Me", which has charted for at least four different artists.

Lewis continued to record at times, and she had her only chart appearance as a singer with "Honey (I Miss You Too)" (1968), which peaked at No. 74 on the country charts. It was an answer song to Bobby Goldsboro's "Honey".

In 1981 Lewis returned to Shreveport and married Alton Warwick, a cousin of Mira Smith. In the late 1980s she became active in efforts to revive the Municipal Auditorium in Shreveport, where the Hayride had performed until its end in 1960. She formed a nonprofit organization to support the effort in 1997. She also became the chairperson of the Louisiana Music Commission, an effort by the Louisiana state government to promote the music industry in the state.

In 1998 she released an album titled "...but I know what I like" on her own Ram Records, under the byline Maggie Lewis Warwick & The Thunderbolts!.

Two of Lewis' songs were used in the episode Lassoed of The L Word.

In 2009, Lewis received the OffBeat magazine award for Lifetime Achievement in the Music Business.

Lewis died age 79 in Shreveport on March 29, 2019, from complications of pneumonia.

== Songwriting hits ==
All of these are credited to Margaret Lewis and Mira (or "Myra") Smith.

- "La-Do-Dada" – w/Dale Hawkins, Rock, 1958
- "Mountain of Love" – David Houston, No. 2 Country, 1963
- "I Almost Called Your Name" – Margaret Whiting, No. 4 Adult Contemporary, 1967
- "I Am the Grass" – Dee Mullins, No. 64 Country, 1968
- "The Girl Most Likely" – Jeannie C. Riley, No. 6 Country, 1968
- "There Never Was A Time" – Jeannie C. Riley, No. 5 Country, 1968
- "Reconsider Me" – Johnny Adams, No. 8 R&B, 1969; Ray Pillow, No. 38 Country, 1969; John Wesley Ryles, No. 39 Country, 1971; Narvel Felts, No. 2 Country, 1975
- "I Can't Be All Bad" – Johnny Adams, No. 45 R&B, 1969
- "The Wedding Cake" – Connie Francis, No. 33 Country, 1969
- "Soul Shake" – Peggy Scott and Jo Jo Benson, No. 27 R&B, 1969; Delaney & Bonnie and Friends, No. 43 Pop, 1970
- "The Rib" – Jeannie C. Riley, No. 32 Country, 1969
- "My Man" – Jeannie C. Riley, No. 60 Country, 1970
- "Country Girl" – Jeannie C. Riley, No. 7 Country, 1970
- "Buffalo Soldier" (David Barnes, Lewis, Smith) – The Flamingos, No. 28 R&B, No. 86 pop, 1970; also recorded by The Persuasions
- "Oh Singer" – Jeannie C. Riley, No. 4 Country, 1971
