= Ram Records (US) =

American record label

RAM Records
- Founded: 1955
- Founder: Mira Ann Smith
- Status: Active
- Distributor: RCA Records
- Genre: Rhythm and blues, rockabilly, blues, country music
- Country of origin: U.S.
- Location: Shreveport, Louisiana

Ram Records (Royal Audio Music) was an American, Shreveport, Louisiana, based record label, founded in 1955 by Mira Ann Smith (1924–1989). The label recorded regional rhythm and blues, rockabilly, blues and country music artists. Ram's pressings were made by RCA. Ram also issued recordings on the Clif Records and K Records labels. The label later moved to Nashville, Tennessee. Ram recorded most of its music in the mid-1950s to early 1960s, but due to a tight budget, many of their recordings remained unreleased for decades. In 1994, Ace Records released a CD set of Ram recordings, including many which had never been issued. In 2018, the Academy Award-winning movie, Green Book, featured six songs from the Ram label.

== Royal Audio Music Recording Company ==
=== Founder ===
Mira Ann Smith was a guitarist, pianist, and songwriter. She was also a fan of the Louisiana Hayride, a popular radio show broadcast out of Shreveport, Louisiana. She observed that many artists performing on the Hayride needed a place to record their music and saw the opportunity to open her own recording studio. In 1955, at the age of 29, Smith opened Royal Audio Music (Ram) Recording Co., located at 2439 Lakeshore Drive in Shreveport, Louisiana. Ram was the first commercial music studio in Shreveport, and Smith was one of the first women to own her own record company. Smith toured Louisiana and east Texas, seeking out skilled musicians to record in her studio. She crossed genre and racial boundaries and found artists who performed a variety of styles including rockabilly, R&B, swamp pop, and country. In 1960, the studio moved to Greenwood Drive (in Shreveport), and included a built-in echo unit and separate vocal booths.

== RAM Records ==
In 1955, a short time after opening the studio, Smith started her own record label, Ram Records. Smith discovered that RCA made custom pressings for independent record labels and decided to use their services. In 1956, Ram released its first record titled, "You Never Mention My Name" / "Just For a While." Smith wrote both songs, and they were performed by country singer Carol Williams. This release was also the first recording for 16-year-old steel guitar player, James Burton, who accompanied her.

In 1956, Ram recorded their first rockabilly release, "You Won't Know Why 'Til I'm Gone" / "Wilson's Blues No 1" by James Wilson and his band, The Jimmie Cats. Billboard gave the song a positive review

Linda Brannon was Ram Records' first big-selling artist. In 1958, at age 17, she recorded the single, "Wherever You Are" / "Just Another Lie" (RAM #1478). Demand for the album was too great for the small Ram studio to handle, so Smith leased it out to Chess Records (Chess Records #1720) for distribution. Billboard reviewed the album and gave it a three star rating. "Just Another Lie" (written by Ernest Suarez) was later recorded by Brenda Lee (Decca #7-38269/Brunswick #LAT 8376) and Jackie DeShannon (Dot Records 45-15928).

Margaret Lewis (Warwick) recorded many songs with the Ram label, including her song, "Honey (I Miss You Too)" which charted at number 74 on the Billboard Hot Country Singles Chart on June 29, 1968. Lewis later became Smith's songwriting partner. Smith and Lewis wrote more than 20 songs for Jeannie C. Riley and over 100 songs in total. Many of their songs made it to the Billboard Top 10 and together they won six BMI Awards. Lewis later married Mira Smith's cousin, Alton Warwick.

Other RAM artists:

- Roy "Boogie Boy" Perkins, (a.k.a. Ernest Suarez) was a songwriter and musician who wrote "Just Another Lie" and many other songs for RAM artists.
- Bobby Page and The Riff Raffs recorded many songs in the Ram studio. The band included singer Bobby Page (a.k.a. Elwood Dugas), singer/pianist Roy "Boogie Boy" Perkins, tenor saxophonist Jimmy "Scatman" Patin, and saxophonist Harry Simoneaux. Many of their songs remained in the Ram vault and were not released until 1994. The band's songs have been played on several TV shows and feature films. Their song, "I Love My Baby" is played in the Academy Award-winning movie, Green Book (2018).
- The Lonesome Drifter (a.k.a. Thomas Johnson)
- Endom Spires (a.k.a. Buddy Sepaugh)
- June Bug Bailey
- Sonny ("Golden Boy") Williamson II,
- Larry Bamburg (a.k.a. Larry Lincoln)
- Charlotte Ray Hunter
- Billy Sanford
- Leon Post
- Elgie Brown

=== Clif Records ===
In 1957, Smith partnered with Cliff Hagin and added Clif Records as a subsidiary record label. Clif's first success was with T.V. Slim (Oscar Wills) and his song "Flatfoot Sam" (Clif #103), written by his wife, Clara Wills. Slim had connections with Leonard Chess and was able to get Checker Records to distribute the song across the nation (Checker #870). Billboard gave the song a 77 rating. "Flatfoot Sam" has since been recorded by Tommy Blake (Sun Records #278), Paul Gayten (Argo Records #5277), Mickey Murray (SSS International #755), and Brian Setzer (for his 2005 album Rockabilly Riot! Volume 1: A Tribute to Sun Records (Surfdog Records #44068-2)). In 1959, the Clif label released the songs "Hot Tamales and Bar-B-Que" by Chico Chism and his Jetanairs.

=== K Records ===
K Records was another Ram subsidiary record label, named after Smith's sister, Katherine. The Lonesome Drifter (Thomas Johnson) and his single "Eager Boy" / "Tear Drop Valley" (1958) is considered one of the more significant recordings from this label.

== Studio struggles ==
In an almost exclusively male business, Smith often found it difficult to find distribution and promotion services. Her cousin, Alton Warwick, was interviewed in 1994 and commented that he believed being a woman hindered her success, because people did not always take her seriously, especially with issues like financing. Due to her tight budget, she only promoted a few singles each year and was often forced to leave quality songs in the vault. Many of Ram's recordings remained unreleased for decades.

== Studio closure ==
When the Louisiana Hayride closed on August 27, 1960, the Shreveport music scene had already faded significantly. As a result, the Ram label was struggling. A few years later, Smith closed the studio and moved to Nashville to focus on songwriting with Lewis. They became partners and continued to own Ram Records. After Smith's death the, by now, Margaret Lewis-Warwick, and her husband Alton Warwick, continued to own and operate Ram Records from Shreveport, Louisiana. They own all trademarks, licensing and catalog.

== Catalog release ==
In 1994, five years after Smith's death from leukemia in 1989, the London-based Ace Records, a British reissue label, released a six CD box set which included many previously unreleased songs from the Ram catalog. Ray Topping assembled the collection. The Ace release received many mentions in the press including in Billboard. In September and October 1994, NPR's Alex Chadwick ran a four part story on the Ram studio and record label.
