= The Wedding Cake =

- Spanish release cover

Single by Connie Francis

from the album The Wedding Cake
- B-side: "Overhill, Underground"
- Released: Late January 1969
- Recorded: January 15, 1969
- Studio: Singleton Sound Studio, 3106 Belmont Blvd., Nashville, TN
- Genre: Country-pop
- Length: 2:37
- Label: MGM; 14034
- Songwriters: Margaret Lewis, Mira Ann Smith
- Producer: Shelby Singleton

Connie Francis singles chronology
"I Don't Wanna Play House" (1968)	"The Wedding Cake" (1969)	"Gone Like the Wind" (1969)

Professional ratings
Review scores
Source	Rating
Record Mirror	4/5 stars
Billboard	Positive (Special Merit Pick)
Cashbox	Positive (Pop Best Bets)
Record World	Positive (Single of the Week)

"The Wedding Cake" is a song written by Margaret Lewis and Mira Ann Smith and most notably performed by Connie Francis. The single brought her back to the pop, easy listening and country charts.

== Connie Francis version ==
=== Background ===
By 1969, Connie Francis' chart presence declined. She rarely scored hits, and the main chart she had success with was the Adult Contemporary chart. "The Wedding Cake" was a brief return to the bottom half of the charts, and was the first of three singles that she released that year. It was produced by Shelby S. Singleton Jr. and months later featured on her 1969 album, The Wedding Cake released a couple of months later. After 1969, Francis took a break from recording, coming back in 1973.

=== Release and reception ===
"The Wedding Cake" was released as a seven-inch single in January 1969 by MGM Records. It was backed by another country song written by the same writers of "The Wedding Cake", "Overhill, Underground" on the B-side, which never saw an album inclusion. The single was advertised as a "new kind of Connie". Focus was also put on the fact that the song was similar to other hit country songs of the time like "Gentle on My Mind", "Honey" and "Little Green Apples".

"The Wedding Cake" was given a positive critical response following its release. US Billboard stated that the "Country flavored rhythm item with good lyric line is performed to perfection by Miss Francis in this commercial entry." Record World put the single in its "Singles of the Week" section, writing that "Connie Francis has gotten together with Shelby Singleton for 'The Wedding Cake'", calling it "...a wife's message". Cashbox reviewed the single in early February and stated that it was "One of the most pleasant derivatives of 'Gentle on My Mind.'" Continuing that "this new Connie Francis side has a lovely sound and the lyrical magnetism to make it her biggest in some time." In the UK Record Mirror gave the single four out of five stars and said that Francis was "on top form", but that "it probably won't be good enough". The magazine noted that the "Story-line song reminiscent of such as 'Honey', with a guitar backing and a build-up of her personal emotion".

=== Chart performance ===
The single received heavy airplay and in 1969, the track reached its best position (No. 19) on the Billboard Easy Listening chart. "The Wedding Cake" also marked Francis' return to the country charts after a nine-year break, the single peaked at No. 33 on the Billboard Hot Country Singles chart and at No. 42 on the Cashbox Top 50 Country chart. It was her final entry on the Billboard Hot 100, reaching No. 91 on the chart. On other American music magazines the single was ranked lower, peaking at No. 97 on the Cashbox Top 100 Singles and at No. 92 on the Record World 100 Top Pops chart. In Canada the single reached No. 83 in the Canadian RPM Top 100 Singles national survey and peaked at No. 16 on their AC chart. Overseas the single also peaked at No. 96 in Australia.

=== Track listing ===
7" vinyl single

- "The Wedding Cake" - 2:37
- "Overhill, Underground" – 3:27

== Charts ==
MGM advertisement for the single, the advert notes that the song is similar to the country songs Honey and Little Green Apples

Chart (1969)	Peak position
US Billboard Hot 100	91
US Billboard Easy Listening	19
US Billboard Country Singles	33
US Cashbox Top 50 Country	42
US Cashbox Top 100 Singles	97
US Record World 100 Top Pops	92
CAN RPM Top 100 Singles	83
CAN RPM Adult Contemporary	16
AUS Top 100 Singles	96

== Other versions ==
- Connie Smith released a version of the song on her 1969 album Back in Baby's Arms.
- Linda Martell, who worked with the same producer and songwriting duo released a version of the song on her 1970 album Color Me Country.
- Jeannie C. Riley released a version of the song on her 1972 album The World of Country.
