= Harper Valley PTA (disambiguation) =

Harper Valley PTA may refer to:

- "Harper Valley PTA", a 1968 country music song written by Tom T. Hall
- Harper Valley PTA (film), a 1978 comedy movie starring Barbara Eden
- Harper Valley PTA (TV series), an early 1980s TV series based on the movie
