= Reconsider Me =

1969 single by Johnny Adams

Single by Johnny Adams

from the album Heart & Soul
- B-side: "If I Could See You One More Time"
- Released: 1969
- Recorded: 1969
- Genre: R&B
- Length: 3:50
- Label: SSS International
- Songwriters: Margaret Lewis, Mira Smith
- Producer: Shelby Singleton

Johnny Adams singles chronology
"Release Me" (1968)	"Reconsider Me" (1969)	"It Can't Be Bad At All" (1969)

"Reconsider Me"

Single by Narvel Felts

from the album Narvel Felts
- B-side: "Foggy Misty Morning"
- Released: 1975
- Genre: Country
- Length: 3:32
- Label: Dot
- Songwriters: Margaret Lewis, Mira Smith
- Producer: Johnny Morris

Narvel Felts singles chronology
"Raindrops" (1974)	"Reconsider Me" (1975)	"Funny How Time Slips Away" (1975)

"Reconsider Me" is a country/soul ballad written by Margaret Lewis and Mira Smith.

== Johnny Adams recording ==
Johnny Adams's 1969 version was his biggest hit, peaking at No.8 on the American R&B charts and No.28 on the pop charts.

== Narvel Felts recording ==
The highest-charting version is by American country music artist Narvel Felts. Released in 1975, it was the first single from his album Narvel Felts. The song peaked at No.2 on the Billboard Hot Country Singles chart and No.67 on the Billboard Hot 100. It also reached No.1 on the RPM Country Tracks chart in Canada.

== Other recordings ==
- In 1969, Ray Pillow's country version hit No.38 on the country charts.
- The song was the title track of a 1971 album, Reconsider Me, by John Wesley Ryles, and as a single it hit No.39 on the country charts.
- In 2009, Louisiana bluesman Bryan Lee covered it on his album My Lady Don't Love My Lady.
- Jimmy Barnes included it on his 2009 album The Rhythm and the Blues.
- In 2013, Dayna Kurtz recorded the track for her album Secret Canon Vol. 2.

== Chart performance ==
=== Johnny Adams ===
Chart (1969)	Peak position
U.S. Billboard Hot R&B Singles	8
U.S. Billboard Hot 100	28

=== Ray Pillow ===
Chart (1969)	Peak position
U.S. Billboard Hot Country Singles	38

=== John Wesley Ryles I ===
Chart (1971)	Peak position
U.S. Billboard Hot Country Singles	39

=== Narvel Felts ===
Chart (1975)	Peak position
U.S. Billboard Hot Country Singles	2
U.S. Billboard Hot 100	67
Canadian RPM Country Tracks	1
