= Heart & Soul (Johnny Adams album) =

Compilation album by Johnny Adams
- Released: 1969
- Recorded: 1962–1968
- Genre: Soul, blues, country, funk
- Length: 49:35
- Label: SSS International
- Producer: Shelby Singleton

Johnny Adams chronology
Heart & Soul (1969)	I Won't Cry (1971)

Singles from Heart & Soul
- 1. "Reconsider Me" Released: June 1969

Heart & Soul is a compilation album by American blues musician Johnny Adams. Released in 1969 by SSS International, the record was produced by Shelby Singleton and contains much of Adams' 1960s output.

== Background ==
Johnny Adams was born in 1932 and grew up in New Orleans, Louisiana. He absorbed the local music heritage and by his teens joined the Soul Revivers, a popular local gospel quartet. By 1959, Adams was living at a rooming house alongside songwriter Dorothy LaBostrie, who convinced him to sing several lines of a song she had just written. "I Won’t Cry", produced by a 19-year-old Mac Rebennack, became a regional best-seller. Adams continued to have a string of local hits until 1962, when "Losing Battle", a tale of backdoor romance, ascended the national R&B charts, peaking at number 27. Adams was connected with New Orleans label Ric Records, owned by Joe Ruffino. In the fall of 1962, Adams, Smokey Johnson, Joe Jones, Earl King and Chris Kenner traveled to Detroit, where they auditioned for Berry Gordy at Motown. According to Earl King, Gordy was interested in recording Adams, but he received a telegram from Ruffino threatening legal action if he did so. Begrudgingly, Adams continued to record for Ric until Ruffino's death in 1963.

Adams’ career stalled by 1964, but he persevered, cutting singles at Gone/Mercury, Huey Meaux's Pacemaker label, and Watch, a local label run by Ruffino's brother-in-law Joe Assunto, and Henry Hildebrand. Some of Adams’ singles only sold a few hundred copies, but as he explained, "It kept my name out there. As long as I had a record out that got played on the radio once in a while or the jukeboxes, I could work off that. When the records stop coming, so does the work." Unexpectedly, Adams caught a break in 1968 when he and Wardell Quezergue teamed up to revive "Release Me"—which had earlier been a hit for Esther Phillips and Engelbert Humperdinck. The Watch single exploded in New Orleans and attracted several national labels interested in leasing it. Eventually, Shelby Singleton's Nashville-based SSS label purchased the master, and Adams' contract. "Release Me" climbed to Number 34 on the pop charts, and his subsequent sessions were assigned to Music City. Adams’ career flourished when he was teamed with the transplanted Shreveport songwriting team of Margaret Lewis and Myrna Smith. "Reconsider Me" (Number 28) and "I Can’t Be All Bad" (Number 45)—"the veritable blueprints for country soul"—followed "Release Me" in the pop charts. SSS issued Heart & Soul, a collection of his recordings to that point, in 1969 as a reaction to the success of his singles. The cover photo pictures Adams standing on the top of a Tennessee mountain on a particularly frigid day, "where the temperature never got above 20 degrees!"

Despite the success of his SSS records, Adams’ life didn't change all that much. "I had a few good paydays, and I bought a new car in 1970, but things weren’t all that different," claimed Adams. "It got to be a hassle out on the road for so long. You'd work on a promise for three nights and the promoter would disappear with the money. That happened to me in Athens, Georgia and I got stranded. Pretty much I stuck with my old routine."

== Composition ==
Heart & Soul largely blends 1960s gospel, soul, pop, blues, country and funk. "Georgia Morning Dew" has been described as "bouncy country-funk" that provides a "giddy, melancholy counterpart to Adams' throaty proclamations."

== Reception ==
In 2013, Tucson Weekly called Heart & Soul a collection of Adams' finest work, writing, "As a compilation, Heart & Soul is replete with Adams' astonishingly full-bellied soul—searching and salutatory, dramatic and light—fitting comfortably alongside such classics of the form as Songs in the Key of Life, Going to a Go-Go, What's Going On, and Otis Blue."

== Track listing ==
Side one

1. "Georgia Morning Dew" – 3:25
2. "In a Moment of Weakness" – 2:35
3. "Real Live Living Hurtin' Man" – 3:10
4. "Lonely Man" – 2:37
5. "I Won't Cry" – 2:17
6. "Release Me" – 2:46

Side two

1. "Proud Woman" – 2:40
2. "I Can't Be All Bad" – 3:04
3. "A Losing Battle" – 2:23
4. "Living on Your Love" – 1:45
5. "Reconsider Me" – 3:50
