= Man of My Word =

Man of my word is a saying for a truthful person.

Man of My Word may also refer to:

- "Man of My Word" (Lil Baby and Lil Durk song), 2021
- "Man of My Word" (Collin Raye song), 1994
- Man of My Word (Johnny Adams album), 1998
