= The Girl Most Likely (song) =

Single by Jeannie C. Riley

from the album Yearbooks and Yesterdays
- B-side: "My Scrapbook"
- Released: November 1968
- Genre: Country
- Label: Plantation
- Songwriter(s): Margaret Lewis; Mira Smith

Jeannie C. Riley singles chronology
"Harper Valley PTA" (1968)	"The Girl Most Likely" (1968)	"The Price I Pay to Stay" (1969)

"The Girl Most Likely" is a single by American country music artist Jeannie C. Riley. Released in November 1968, it was the first single from her album Yearbooks and Yesterdays. The song was written by the songwriting team of Margaret Lewis and Mira Smith, who also wrote the hits "The Rib", "Country Girl", and "Oh Singer" for Riley.

The song peaked at number 6 on the Billboard Hot Country Singles chart. It also reached number 1 on the RPM Country Tracks chart in Canada.

== Chart performance ==
Chart (1968–1969)	Peak position
U.S. Billboard Hot Country Singles	6
U.S. Billboard Hot 100	55
Canadian RPM Country Tracks	1
Canadian RPM Top Singles	34
