= Room with a View of the Blues =

Studio album by Johnny Adams
- Released: 1988
- Genre: Blues
- Label: Rounder
- Producer: Scott Billington

Johnny Adams chronology
After Dark (1985)	Room with a View of the Blues (1988)	Walking on a Tightrope (1989)

Room with a View of the Blues is an album by the American blues musician Johnny Adams, released in 1988. Adams won a W.C. Handy Award for the album.

== Production ==
The album was produced by Scott Billington. It contains songs written by Percy Mayfield, Lowell Fulson, and Doc Pomus, with instrumentation provided by Dr. John and Walter "Wolfman" Washington, among others.

== Critical reception ==
Professional ratings
Review scores
Source	Rating
AllMusic	4.5/5 stars
Chicago Sun-Times	4/4 stars
The Encyclopedia of Popular Music	4/5 stars
MusicHound Jazz: The Essential Album Guide	3.5/5 stars
The Rolling Stone Album Guide	4/5 stars

The Washington Post thought that the album "clearly ranks among his best work," writing that "although Adams' voice is remarkably agile, the album's performances are more restrained and bluesy than usual." Newsweek declared that "Adams may be the best not-quite-famous singer in the world." The Austin American-Statesman praised Adams's "amazing vocal range."

AllMusic wrote that "with great support from an instrumental corps that includes guitarists Walter 'Wolfman' Washington and Duke Robillard, keyboardist Dr. John, and saxophonists Red Tyler and Foots Samuel, plus Ernie Gautreau on valve trombone, Adams didn't just cut a blues album, he made unforgettable blues statements."

== Track listing ==
No.	Title	Length
1.	"Room with a View"	5:03
2.	"I Don't Want to Do Wrong"	5:43
3.	"Not Trustworthy (A Lyin' Woman)"	3:35
4.	"Neither One of Us (Want to Be the First to Say Goodbye)"	6:16
5.	"Body and Fender Man"	5:30
6.	"I Owe You"	4:56
7.	"Wish I'd Never Loved You at All"	3:07
8.	"The Hunt Is On"	3:46
9.	"A World I Never Made"	3:53

== Personnel ==
- Guitar: Duke Robillard, Walter "Wolfman" Washington
- Bass: David Barard
- Keyboards: Dr. John
- Drums: Herman "Roscoe" Ernest III
- Saxophone: Bill Samuel, Alvin Tyler
- Horns: Ernie Gautreau, Terry Tullos
