= Susan Swift =

American actress

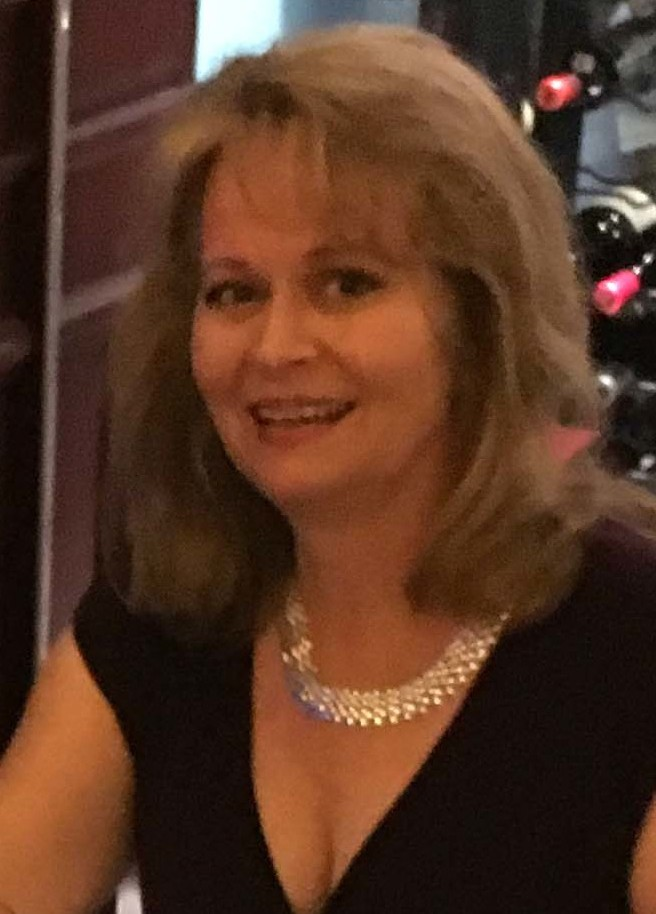
- Born: Houston, Texas, U.S.
- Occupation: Actress
- Years active: 1977–1987, 1995
- Spouse: Alan Arnall (m. 1993)
- Children: 7

Susan Swift is an American actress best known for her work as a child actress and her role as Ivy Templeton in Audrey Rose (1977).

== Early life ==
Swift was born in Houston, Texas. She has one sister, Kathryn. At the time when Audrey Rose was filmed, she was attending Webster Intermediate School in Webster, Texas.

== Acting career ==
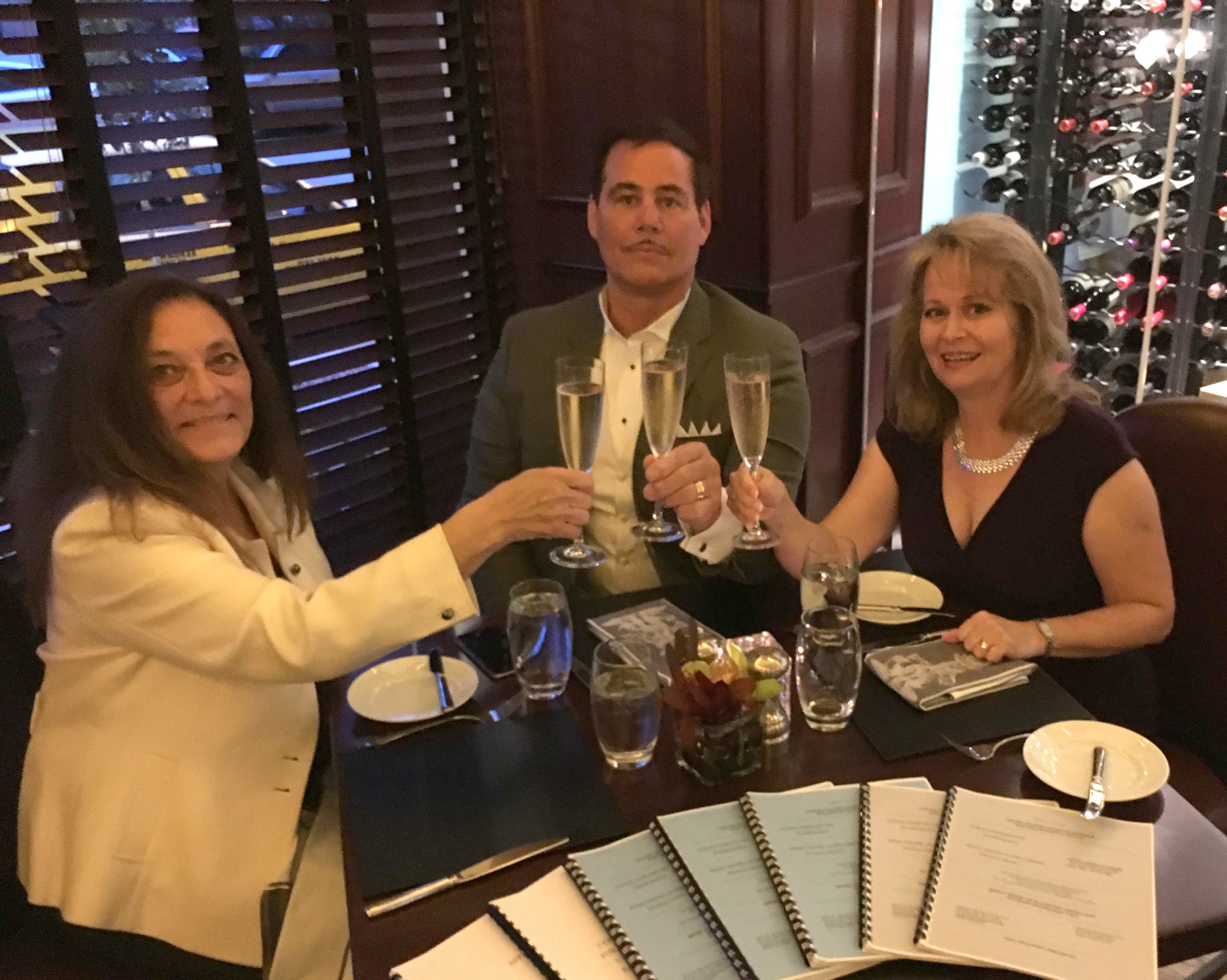
Dr. Edward A. Graff PhD, Attorney Leah Poulos-Mueller (US Olympian and World Record Holder) and Attorney Susan Swift (Actress and Author) celebrating at the Pfister Hotel in Milwaukee, Wisconsin following Appeal Decision of United States District Court dismissing Plaintiff's claims of SEC Regulation violations and United States 7th Circuit decision to vacate and remand

Swift made her acting debut in 1977 at the age of 13, in the horror film Audrey Rose, as Ivy Templeton, a young girl suffering from disturbing nightmares because she is the reincarnation of a girl named Audrey Rose. Produced by Frank De Felitta, a nationwide search was done to identify a young girl to play the lead role and Swift won the role after being scouted at a local theater group at her middle school. De Felitta wanted to avoid casting a known child actor and was rather looking for 'the perfect face' to play the lead role.

The following year, Swift appeared as 14-year-old Dee Johnson in the comedy Harper Valley PTA, with Barbara Eden and Ronny Cox. In 1981, she starred in her first leading role, in the Bert I. Gordon film Burned at the Stake. Her final film appearance came in 1995, when she starred in Halloween: The Curse of Michael Myers, with Donald Pleasence, Paul Rudd and Marianne Hagan.

Swift has a short film career, as well as a short television career for which she appeared in several guest roles during the 1970s and '80s. Her first television role was in the CBS mini-series The Chisholms, which ran for a total of 13 episodes over a year. They also include the short-lived series Seven Brides for Seven Brothers, which lasted one season, the Golden Globe-winning Magnum, P.I., Amazing Stories and Simon & Simon. Among her television film credits are Featherstone's Nest, The Six of Us and A Killer in the Family.

== Personal life ==
Swift has been married to attorney Alan Arnall since 1993. She is a mother of seven and currently resides, with her husband, in Glendale, California. She is a contributor to the conservative political website Politichicks.

== Filmography ==
Feature films
Year	Film	Role	Notes
1977	Audrey Rose	Ivy Templeton	
1978	Harper Valley PTA	Dee Johnson	
1979	Featherstone's Nest	Kelly Featherstone	Television film
1981	Burned at the Stake	Loreen Graham/Ann Putnam	
1982	The Six of Us	Tessa Benjamin	Television film
1983	A Killer in the Family	Teresa	Television film
1995	Halloween: The Curse of Michael Myers	Mary	

Television
Year	Film	Role	Notes
1979	The Chisholms	Annabel Chisholm	Episodes: "Chapter I", "Chapter II"
1982	Seven Brides for Seven Brothers	Sally	Episode: "Rodeo"
1985	Magnum, P.I.	Sunshine	Episode: "Compulsion"
1986	Amazing Stories	Marsha	Episode: "What If...?"
1987	Simon & Simon	Jeanine	Episode: "Desperately Seeking Dacody"
