= T.V. Slim =

- Born: Oscar W. Wills; February 10, 1916; Near Bethany, Louisiana and Texas, U.S.
- Died: October 21, 1969 (aged 53) Kingman, Arizona
- Genres: Blues and R&B
- Occupations: Singer, guitarist and songwriter
- Instruments: Vocals, guitar
- Years active: 1955–1969

Oscar W. Wills (February 10, 1916 – October 21, 1969) known professionally as T.V. Slim, was an American blues and R&B singer, guitarist and songwriter. His best selling work was "Flat Foot Sam", which helped propel his recording career through to the date of his death.

== Life and career ==
He was born near to Bethany, Louisiana and Texas, United States. His influences included the harmonica playing of DeFord Bailey and both Sonny Boy Williamson I and Sonny Boy Williamson II, and for guitar work, Guitar Slim. In 1956, when he was living in Houston, Texas, Wills sold one of his early compositions, "My Dolly Bee," to Don Robey for Junior Parker's use on Duke Records. It ended up as the B-side of the Little Junior Parker (as he was then billed) single, "Next Time You See Me". Seeing an opportunity to record himself, Wills set up his own record label, Speed Records, which issued the bulk of his recordings over the next 12 years.

He was not a full-time musician, as his main source of income was working as a television repairman. When he met Stan Lewis, who later became the owner of Jewel Records, Lewis noticed his thin physique and quipped that an apt moniker for Wills would be T.V. Slim. In 1957, Slim recorded his humorous tale of a hapless individual, "Flat Foot Sam", with his backing group the Heartbreakers, comprising Mighty Joe Young (guitar), Eddie Williams (piano) and Jimmy White (drums). The first version of "Flat Foot Sam" was issued by the tiny Shreveport, Louisiana record label, Clif Records, the same year. Regional sales of the disc were impressive and this came to the attention of Checker Records, who were keen to reissue the song to a wider audience. However, the jagged raw first version was snubbed, and Slim was persuaded to re-record the number in New Orleans, under the tutelage of Cosimo Matassa. This time, Robert Parker gave a saxophone solo, Chess A&R man Paul Gayten played the piano, with Charles "Hungry" Williams on drums. The release went on to become Slim's biggest seller, when issued on another Chess subsidiary, Argo Records. Oddly, the re-recording was released under his own name, Oscar Wills. This was not the only change. The Clif Records release indicated that the song's writer was Clara Wills (probably Oscar's wife), but the writer's credit on the Argo single were to O. Wills and S. Lewis. Chess Records had the common practice at that time, where a songwriter had to share the publishing with someone in the industry, who would ensure the record gained sufficient promotion; in this case the aforementioned Stan Lewis. Leonard Chess, for some reason, then reissued the original Clif version on Checker, in the same month as the Argo re-recording was released. Billboard, possibly baffled by it all, awarded the original version of "Flat Foot Sam" a higher rating (77) than the Argo single (75).

There was a further twist in the tale. As Slim had only recorded the one side in New Orleans, the record company needed a track to go on the B-side. This turned out to be an instrumental "Nervous Boogie" recorded by Paul Gayten, who had played piano and produced Slim's June session. "Nervous Boogie" generated the greater demand, and ended with a peak position of number 68 on the Billboard pop chart in December 1957. "Flat Foot Sam" itself did not chart, despite being a decent seller. Tommy Blake released a competing version of "Flatfoot Sam" in September 1957. Slim, spurred by relative success, then recorded a number of sequels to his 'hit', with titles including "Flatfoot Sam Made a Bet", "Flat Foot Sam Met Jim Dandy," "Flat Foot Sam #2", and "Flatfoot Sam Is Back". Slim relocated to California in 1959, but continued recording and performing regularly. As well as his own label, Slim had singles released by a slew of small West Coast labels such as Pzazz (owned by Paul Gayten), USA, Timbre, Excell and Ideel. His billing remained fluid as records were issued showing, T.V .Slim and His Heartbreakers, Oscar T-V Slim Wills and His Heartbreakers, T.V. Slim and His Bluesmen, T.V. Slim and His Guitar, Oscar Wills and His Good Rockin' Band, and T V Slim & the Soul Brothers among others. His song writing subjects rarely traveled far from domestic themes, often delivered with a swamp blues styling. One example was the 1966 Excell release "T.V. Man", written about his real life experiences as a television repair man. Albert Collins later covered Slim's Speed Records B-side track, "Don't Reach Cross My Plate". Wills died in a car accident on U.S. Route 66 outside Kingman, Arizona, in October 1969, when traveling home to Los Angeles after playing a date in Chicago. He was 53 years old.

== Compilation album ==
- T.V. Slim, Flat Foot Sam (Official 5660). This 1999 Danish release contained 31 tracks, the majority of his output.

Otherwise, his music is almost impossible to obtain. His original vinyl discs, albeit issued in small numbers at the time, nowadays are collector's items.
