= Harper Valley PTA (film) =

1978 film

- Theatrical release poster
- Directed by: Richard Bennett; Ralph Senensky (uncredited)
- Written by: George Edwards; Barry Schneider
- Produced by: George Edwards
- Starring: Barbara Eden; Nanette Fabray; Ronny Cox; Louis Nye; Susan Swift; Pat Paulsen
- Cinematography: Willy Kurant
- Edited by: Michael Economou
- Music by: Nelson Riddle
- Distributed by: April Fools Productions
- Release date: May 23, 1978
- Running time: 93 minutes
- Country: United States
- Language: English
- Budget: $1 million
- Box office: $25 million (United States) or $8.5 million

Harper Valley PTA is a 1978 American comedy film inspired by the popular 1968 country song "Harper Valley PTA" written by Tom T. Hall and performed by country singer Jeannie C. Riley. The film starred Barbara Eden, Nanette Fabray, Ronny Cox, Louis Nye and Susan Swift, directed by Richard Bennett and Ralph Senensky (who left the production during filming, and was replaced by Bennett), and primarily released to drive-in theaters throughout the summer of 1978. The film has a cult following among fans of the original song. The film's promotional tagline is: "The song was scandalous. The movie is hilarious!"

== Plot ==
Stella Johnson is an adventerous, widowed single mother who lives in the town of Harper Valley, Ohio. She sells cosmetics door-to-door for the fictitious AngelGlo Cosmetics. Her fourteen-year-old daughter, Dee, is a student at Harper Valley Junior High School. Dee brings her mother a letter from the school's Parent-Teacher Association board, which is led by the pompous and snobbish Flora Simpson-Reilly, denounces Stella for not following the societal mores of the day. She threatens to expel Dee from school if Stella doesn't change her ways.

Infuriated by the board's supposed superiority and glaring hypocrisy, Stella storms into a PTA meeting and tells off the board. After her house is toilet papered and a rock with a vile note attached is thrown through her window in retaliation, Stella prepares to get even with those wanting her driven out of town. Teaming up with beautician Alice Finley and bartender Herbie Maddox, Stella and Dee embark on a campaign of revente against six PTA members. They trick a married male board member who has repeatedly made passes as Stella into a disastrous rendezvous, embarrass Mrs. Simpson-Reilly at one of her grand social gatherings, expose the secret antics of another repressed female board teacher, and send a herd of pink-painted elephants into the bedroom of an alcoholic board member.

Stella discovers one of the wealthy PTA members, Willis Newton, has fallen in love with her. Will and another board member, Skeeter Duggan, the town's notary public, are sympathetic to Stella and tired of current PTA board's incompetence and mismanagement. They convince Stella to run for President of the PTA. With help of a makeover, Dee finds a boyfriend in handsome Carlyle, a popular track star, incurring the jealousy of Bettina Reilly, the equally snobbish granddaughter of Flora. Real estate agent Kirby Baker, a member of the PTA Board, plans to ruin Stella by foreclosing on her house but is arrested for assaulting Myrna Wong, an Asian-American martial arts expert helping Stella set up the lecherous Baker.

The board, desperate and unable to put the brakes on Stella's growing popularity, hire two thugs named Dutch and Tex to have Skeeter abducted so they can commit election fraud. They drag Skeeter to an abbey and ply him with wine. Olive Glover, the PTA's Recording Secretary, has stolen money from a fundraiser because of her gambling addiction and intends frame Mavis for the theft. Stella and Alice follow Olive to a racing stable and recover the stolen money, some of which had been marked by Will. They race back to town, and Will and Herbie spot Skeeter with his captors outside the abbey from a helicopter and notify the girls. Stella and Alice, posing as nuns, rescue Skeeter and elude the kidnappers.

Flora fails to prevent Stella's nomination. Olive, who would have been the swing vote against Stella, is arrested for embezzlement just as PTA Board is about to vote down Stella's candidacy. Dutch and Tex, in police custody, admit Flora arranged the kidnapping to keep Stella off the PTA Board. Stella is decisively elected PTA president and flies off in Will's helicopter to marry him. Behind the helicopter is a banner reading "STELLA JOHNSON FOR MAYOR."

== Cast and characters ==
- Barbara Eden as Stella Johnson, a widowed cosmetics salesperson with a young daughter, whose joie de vivre, principles, and individuality anger most of the powerful people in town and on the Parent-Teacher Association board.
- Ronny Cox as Willis "Will" Newton, a wealthy member of the PTA who doesn't agree with Flora and her snobby allies and is in love with Stella.
- Nanette Fabray as Alice Finley, Stella's best friend and co-conspirator against the snobs of Harper Valley. She owns and operates the La Moderne Beauty Shop.
- Louis Nye as Kirby Baker, a local real estate agent who is allied with Flora and her friends. Notorious for being a lecherous playboy and infamous for impregnating his secretaries.
- John Fiedler as Bobby Taylor, a man on the PTA who lusts after Stella.
- Ron Masak as Herbie Maddox, the head bartender at Kelly's bar, and Stella's ally against Flora and her friends. He has a crush on Stella, and is one of her friends.
- Clint Howard as Corley, a young delivery person, who works for the local florist shop, who brings Stella flowers from Will.
- Susan Swift as Dee Johnson, Stella's 14-year-old daughter, who is threatened with expulsion from school if her mother doesn't conform to the way the PTA wants her to behave.
- Pat Paulsen as Otis Harper, the descendant of the founding family of Harper Valley. A PTA member who is allied with Flora and her friends. Has a tendency to drink all the time, which annoys his wife, Bertha.
- Amzie Strickland as Shirley Thompson, a member of the PTA board who tends to drink a lot of gin.
- Bob Hastings as Skeeter Duggan, a member of the PTA board, and the town's Notary public who is sympathetic to Stella.
- Audrey Christie as Flora Simpson-Reilly. She is the pompous and extremely snobbish president of the PTA board who thoroughly despises Stella.
- Molly Dodd as Olive Glover, the recording secretary of the PTA who is a gambling addict.
- Fay DeWitt as Willamae Jones, a snide biology teacher at the junior high school who is also a member of the PTA.
- Louise Foley as Mavis, Dee Johnson's best friend, who is nearly framed for a crime she did not commit by the vindictive Olive Glover.
- Brian Cook as Carlyle, a popular track star.
- Laura Teige as Bettina Reilly, One of Flora's twin granddaughters, who wants to be with Carlyle, and is jealous when he chooses Dee over her.
- Jan Teige as Edwina Reilly, Bettina's twin sister, who is just as snotty.
- Irene Yah-Ling Sun as Myrna Wong, a friend of Stella's who is a judo expert.
- Tobias Anderson as "Cranky" Barney Crunk, the town's nosy mailman who has the habit of peeking in everyone's mail.
- Royce D. Applegate as Dutch, one of two kidnappers who abduct Skeeter Duggan at Flora Simpson-Reilly's orders.
- J. J. Barry as Tex, the mastermind of the kidnap plot to get Skeeter Duggan out of the way.
- Pitt Herbert as Henry Reilly, Flora's overly dominated husband and grandfather to Edwina and Bettina. Henry is wealthy, but is very weak-willed and is known for acquiescing to his wife's schemes.
- Arlen Stuart as Bertha Harper, wife of Otis Harper, who gets annoyed by her husband's continual drinking.
- Woody Harrelson as an extra.

== Production and release ==
=== Filming ===
Harper Valley PTA was filmed over 27 days, from October 1, 1977, to December 8, 1977. It was filmed on location for one week in Lebanon, Ohio and continued in Los Angeles, California. Woody Harrelson was a junior in high school living in Lebanon when the production was filming there, and was an extra in the film. The track meet scene was filmed at Simi Valley High School.

Director Ralph Senensky left the production two weeks before the end of principal photography and was replaced by Richard Bennett. On October 31, 1977, Senensky argued with the producers about a scene featuring pink elephants in the Hancock Park neighborhood of Los Angeles, California, believing that the animals would be spooked by filming on Halloween night. Senensky turned out to be right. Nanette Fabray was knocked to the ground by a spooked elephant and production ceased temporarily. She suffered a severe concussion, bruises and back sprains and was taken to Cedars-Sinai Medical Center where her condition was reported as serious but stable. Filming resumed on November 30, after Fabray recovered.

=== Release ===
Harper Valley PTA opened in six theaters in Lebanon, Cincinnati, and Dayton, Ohio, on May 23, 1978, in accordance with executive producer Phil Borack's plan to release the film first in smaller markets, where regional success could encourage bigger cities to book the film. The film grossed over $2 million its opening weekend, $5.8 million in its first three weeks and over $16 million after 12 weeks. The film opened in limited release on June 2, 1978; in Los Angeles on August 2, 1978; and in New York City on January 12, 1979.

== Soundtrack ==
Harper Valley PTA: Original Soundtrack Recording

Soundtrack album by various artists
- Released: June 1978
- Recorded: Singleton Sound Studios; Nashville, Tennessee
- Genre: Soundtrack
- Length: 29:50
- Label: Plantation Records
- Producer: Shelby S. Singleton Jr.

Singles from Harper Valley PTA
- 1. "Harper Valley PTA (re-issue)" Released: 1978; 2. "Widow Jones" Released: 1978

Harper Valley PTA: Original Soundtrack Recording was released in June 1978 on vinyl, cassette tape and 8-track tape by Plantation Records. To promote the film's release and its soundtrack, the title song by Jeannie C. Riley was re-issued as a single. The album made its CD premiere through Varèse Sarabande on October 27, 2017.

Side 1

1. "Harper Valley PTA" – Jeannie C. Riley (3:12)
2. "Dee's Visit" (instrumental) – Nelson Riddle (2:10)
3. "Mr. Harper" – Barbara Eden (2:22)
4. "Alice's Place" (instrumental) – Nelson Riddle (2:29)
5. "High School Confidential" – Jerry Lee Lewis (3:07)
6. "Willie May" (instrumental) – Nelson Riddle (2:01)

Side 2

1. "Harper Valley PTA" (instrumental) – Nelson Riddle (1:55)
2. "Widow Jones" – Barbara Eden (2:38)
3. "Twin Tune" (instrumental) – Nelson Riddle (1:30)
4. "Ballad of a Teenage Queen" – Johnny Cash (2:51)
5. "Ice Cream Disco" (instrumental) – Nelson Riddle (1:48)
6. "Whatever Happened to Charlie Brown" – Rita Remington & Carol Channing (2:40)
7. "Ending (Reprise: Harper Valley PTA)" (instrumental) – Nelson Riddle (1:06)

== Television series ==
In 1981, Harper Valley PTA was made into a television sitcom (created by Sherwood Schwartz) which aired on NBC from January 1981 to May 1982. Barbara Eden reprised her role as Stella Johnson for the series which lasted two seasons and a total of 30 episodes were produced.
