= Another Page (song) =

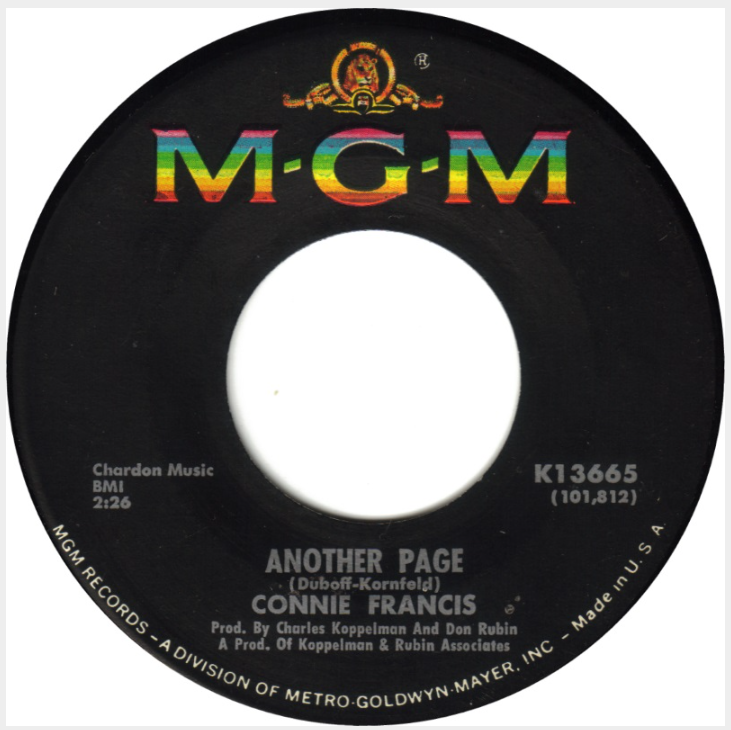
- A-side of the single

Single by Connie Francis

from the album The Wedding Cake
- B-side: "Souvenir d'Italie"
- Released: January 1967
- Recorded: October, December 1966
- Genre: Country; Pop-Rock; Folk
- Length: 2:26
- Label: MGM; 13665
- Songwriters: Steven William Duboff; Arthur Kornfeld
- Producers: Charles Koppelman, Don Rubin and Pete Spargo

Connie Francis singles chronology
"Spanish Nights and You" (1966)	"Another Page" (1967)	"Time Alone Will Tell" (1967)

"Another Page" is a song written by Steven William Duboff and Arthur Kornfeld and most notably performed by Connie Francis, who released it as a single at the start of 1967.

== Connie Francis version ==
=== Background ===
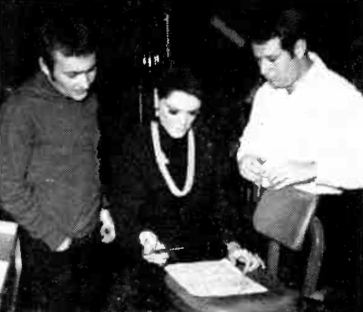
Producers Charles Koppelman and Don Rubin with singer Connie Francis.

By 1967, Francis only scored minor hits, and the main chart she had success with was the Adult Contemporary chart. The new single followed a period of declining chart performance for Francis, but unlike previous singles, completely missed the aforementioned AC chart, (then called the Easy Listening chart). "Another Page" was the first of five singles that she released that year. It was produced by Charles Koppelman, Don Rubin, and by Pete Spargo on the B-side and two years later featured on her 1969 album, The Wedding Cake. The single was recorded in a session in late December 1966, along with the song "You Know You're Not Forsaken", which appeared in the same album as "Another Page", but didn't see a single release.

=== Release and reception ===
Professional ratings
Review scores
Source	Rating
Record World	4/5 stars
Cashbox	Positive (Pick of the Week)

"Another Page" was released as a seven-inch single in January 1967 by MGM Records. It was backed by an Italian song written by Carl Sigman, Scarnicci Tarabusi and L. Luttazzi, "Souvenir d'Italie" on the B-side, which was lifted from her album Love, Italian Style, released at the same time as the single, but recorded in October 1966. The single was advertised as "another hit".

The single received a positive reception upon its release. Record World put the single in its "Four Stars" singles section, calling the single "Pop-rock-folk", and asked, "do we hear a trace of country?" The magazine concluded with "Another strong side from Miss Francis." Cashbox reviewed the single in the middle of January and stated that it was a "...highly spirited, driving romp" that "could easily do it again for the lark." The magazine said to "Watch this folk-flavored ode closely." Cashbox also noted that the "Lush, shuffling, Mediterranean-oriented romancer", "Souvenir D’ltalie," could also "be a big one."

=== Chart performance ===
In early 1967, the track bubbled under the Billboard Hot 100, reaching number 21. On other American music magazines, the single was ranked higher, breaking into and peaking at number 98 on the Cashbox Top 100 Singles and reaching number 3 on the Record World Up-Coming Singles chart.

=== Track listing ===
7" vinyl single

- "Another Page" - 2:26
- "Souvenir d'Italie" – 2:38

== Charts ==
Chart performance for "Another Page"
Chart (1967)	Peak position
US Billboard Bubbling Under Hot 100	121
US Cashbox Top 100 Singles	98
US Record World Up-Coming Singles	103
