= Burned at the Stake =

1981 film by Bert I. Gordon

- Theatrical poster
- Directed by: Bert I. Gordon
- Written by: Bert I. Gordon
- Produced by: Bert I. Gordon
- Starring: Susan Swift; Tisha Sterling; Beverly Ross; David Rounds; Albert Salmi
- Cinematography: Daniel Yarussi
- Edited by: Ron Sawade
- Music by: Arthur Kempel
- Production company: Alan Landsburg Productions
- Distributed by: International Film Market
- Release date: 1981
- Running time: 88 minutes
- Country: United States
- Language: English

Burned at the Stake, also released as The Coming, is a 1981 film directed by Bert I. Gordon. It stars Susan Swift and Albert Salmi.

== Plot ==
In the Salem of 1692, a group of witches are burned at the stake. Now, in the 1980s, Ann Putnam, a witch comes back from the dead, possesses one of her descendants Loreen Graham, and goes hunting for the occupants of the town to avenge her death.

== Cast ==
- Susan Swift as Loreen Graham / Ann Putnam
- Albert Salmi as Captain Billingham
- Guy Stockwell as Dr. Grossinger
- Tisha Sterling as Karen Graham
- Beverly Ross as Merlina
- David Rounds as William Goode

== See also ==
- List of American films of 1981
- List of films about witchcraft
