= Ram Records =

Ram Records could refer to two different record labels:

- RAM Records, a British drum and bass label
- Ram Records (US), a Shreveport, Louisiana-based label
