= Connie Francis Sings the Songs of Les Reed =

Connie Francis sings The Songs of Les Reed

Studio album by Connie Francis
- Released: November 1969
- Recorded: September 6, 1969; September 8 – 9, 1969; September 25, 1969
- Genre: Pop
- Length: 32:15
- Labels: MGM; SE-4655
- Producer: Les Reed

Connie Francis chronology
The Wedding Cake (1969)	Connie Francis sings The Songs of Les Reed (1969)

Singles from Connie Francis sings The Songs of Les Reed
- 1. "Mr. Love" Released: November 1969

Connie Francis sings The Songs of Les Reed is a studio album recorded by American singer Connie Francis. It is the last album Francis recorded under her long-term contract with MGM Records which had been signed in 1955.

== Background ==
Although not really a commercial success Francis' 1968 album Connie Francis Sings Bacharach & David, a portrait of the songwriting collaboration between Burt Bacharach and Hal David had received enough critical praise to repeat the concept. This time, Francis portrayed the work of British composer Les Reed. In 1979 Polydor Records released a two-record set of both albums.

Principal recording took place on September 6, 8 and 9, 1969 at Wessex Studios in London. Additional vocals and instrumental overdubs were recorded September 25, 1969 in New York.

Arrangements were provided by David Whitaker and Reed himself. Both also appeared as conductors.

== Reception ==
Billboard wrote in a review: "This LP shows Miss Francis in some of her finest singing moments, as she moves into the Reed bag of song tricks."

== Track listing ==
Side A
No.	Title	Writer(s)	Length
1.	"Delilah"	Les Reed, Barry Mason	3:12
2.	"Les Bicyclettes de Belsize"	Les Reed, Barry Mason	3:01
3.	"Don't Say a Word"	Les Reed, Barry Mason	2:50
4.	"Kiss Me Goodbye"	Les Reed, Barry Mason	3:38
5.	"Three Good Reasons"	Les Reed, Geoff Stephens	4:32

Side B
No.	Title	Writer(s)	Length
1.	"Mr. Love"	Les Reed, Barry Mason	3:23
2.	"It's Not Unusual"	Les Reed, Gordon Mills	2:04
3.	"The Last Waltz"	Les Reed, Barry Mason	3:19
4.	"What's Wrong With My World"	Les Reed, Barry Mason	3:01
5.	"A Lifetime of Love"	Les Reed, Barry Mason	3:15
