= Three Good Reasons (song) =

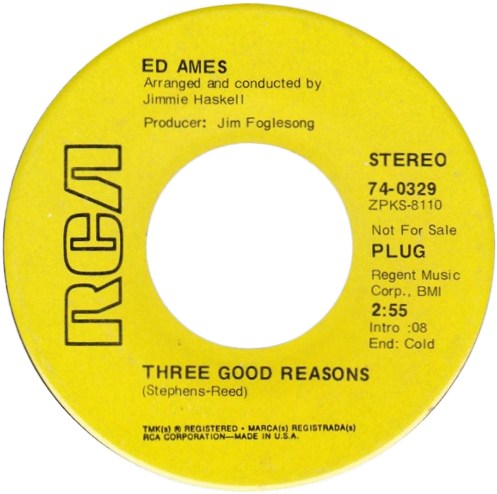

Single by Ed Ames

from the album Sing Away the World
- B-side: "Honey, What's the Matter?"
- Released: March 1970
- Studio: RCA's Music Center of the World, Hollywood, California
- Genre: Pop; easy listening
- Length: 2:55
- Label: RCA Victor Records
- Songwriters: Les Reed; Geoff Stephens
- Producer: Jim Foglesong

Ed Ames singles chronology
"A Thing Called Love" (1969)	"Three Good Reasons" (1970)	"Think Summer" (1970)

"Three Good Reasons" is a 1969 song written by Les Reed and Geoff Stephens. It was most notably performed by Ed Ames, who released it as a single in early 1970. His version reached the US adult-oriented charts and received a positive reception. Other versions were recorded by Connie Francis in 1969 for her album Connie Francis Sings the Songs of Les Reed and in 1970 by Frank Ifield for a UK single release.

== Background and release ==
American singer Ed Ames enjoyed brief pop success in 1967 and 1968, charting several songs in the top-100 of charts. As sales decreased he switched his style to message songs in 1969 with "Changing, Changing" and LPs such as Love of the Common People. In early 1970 Ames shifted back to love ballads, starting with "Three Good Reasons". The single was produced by Jim Foglesong, and arranged by Jimmie Haskell on both sides. The two songs were included in his subsequent album, Sing Away the World, with songs in a similar style.

== Critical reception ==
Professional ratings
Review scores
Source	Rating
Record World	4/5 stars
Cashbox	Positive (Pick of the Week)

The single received a positive critical reception upon its release. Cashbox stated that "Easing out of the 'contemporary' flair and into a sparkling ballad aptly suited to his powerful voice, Ed Ames offers an especially fine performance for his latest." The publication believed that the song "is bound to see excellent MOR and easy listening play and could make inroads on the younger market." Record World gave the single a four-star rating and said that "Ed's back to doing ballads and this is a fine example of this art." They noted that it "Will catch on with the MOR crowd."

== Chart performance ==
"Three Good Reasons" became an easy-listening success while missing the pop charts. It entered the Billboard Easy Listening chart in the issue dated April 25, 1970, reaching number 28 during a two-week run on it. It debuted on the Record World Top-Non Rock chart in the issue dated May 2, 1970, peaking at a lower number 36 during a two-week run as well. It was his final top-30 on the American adult-oriented charts.

== Charts ==
Chart performance for "Three Good Reasons" by Ames
Chart (1970)	Peak position
US Billboard Easy Listening	28
US Record World Top-Non Rock	36
