= Connie Francis Sings Bacharach & David =

Connie Francis sings Bacharach & David

Studio album by Connie Francis
- Released: November 1968
- Recorded: April 1968; October 1 – 3, 1968
- Genre: Pop
- Length: 35:40
- Label: MGM Records; SE-4585
- Producer: Claus Ogerman

Connie Francis chronology
Connie & Clyde – Hit Songs of the 30s (1968)	Connie Francis sings Bacharach & David (1968)	The Wedding Cake (1969)

Connie Francis Sings Bacharach & David is studio album recorded by American entertainer Connie Francis. The album features a collection of songs written by the legendary 1960s songwriting duo Burt Bacharach and Hal David.

== Background ==
Francis had already begun to work on this project in April 1968 under the musical supervision of Teddy Randazzo, a former fellow high school student. Unsatisfied with Randazzo's working methods, Francis had abandoned the project after recording only three songs.

The project was picked up again in October 1968 when Francis teamed up with Claus Ogerman with whom she had collaborated previously during the recording of the songs for her movie Looking for Love in late 1963 and early 1964.

== Release ==
Released in November 1968, Connie Francis sings Bacharach & David is the first album by Francis on MGM Records released exclusively in stereo. All previous albums had either been released in both stereo and mono or exclusively in mono. In 1979 Polydor Records released a two-record set of this album together with the Connie Francis Sings the Songs of Les Reed album.

== Track listing ==
=== Side A ===
#	Title	Songwriter	Length
1.	"What the World Needs Now Is Love"	Burt Bacharach, Hal David	3.38
2.	"Promises, Promises"	Burt Bacharach, Hal David	1.56
3.	"The Look of Love"	Burt Bacharach, Hal David	3.17
4.	"Do You Know the Way to San José?"	Burt Bacharach, Hal David	2.56
5.	"Trains and Boats and Planes"	Burt Bacharach, Hal David	2.30
6.	"Make It Easy on Yourself"	Burt Bacharach, Hal David	2.35

=== Side B ===
#	Title	Songwriter	Length
1.	"Alfie"	Burt Bacharach, Hal David	3.08
2.	"This Girl's In Love With You/I Say a Little Prayer" (Medley)	Burt Bacharach, Hal David	3.17
3.	"Wanting Things"	Burt Bacharach, Hal David	3.19
4.	"Walk On By"	Burt Bacharach, Hal David	2.48
5.	"Magic Moments/Blue on Blue" (Medley)	Burt Bacharach, Hal David	3.15
6.	"Don't Make Me Over"	Burt Bacharach, Hal David	3.01

=== Recordings from the abandoned collaboration with Teddy Randazzo ===
#	Title	Songwriter	Length	Remark
1.	"Lovin' Is a Way of Livin'"	Burt Bacharach, Hal David	2.46	unreleased until 2008
2.	"Make It Easy on Yourself"	Burt Bacharach, Hal David	3.23	unreleased to this day
3.	"The Story of My Life"	Burt Bacharach, Hal David	3.07	unreleased until 2008
