= Man of My Word (Johnny Adams album) =

Studio album by Johnny Adams
- Released: 1998
- Studio: Ultrasonic
- Genres: Blues, soul
- Label: Rounder
- Producer: Scott Billington

Johnny Adams chronology
One Foot in the Blues (1996)	Man of My Word (1998)

Man of My Word is an album by the American musician Johnny Adams, released in 1998. It was his ninth album for Rounder Records. Man of My Word was released shortly before Adams's death; it was recorded while his cancer was in remission.

== Production ==
Recorded at Ultrasonic Studios, the album was produced by Scott Billington. Adams's band was headed by Walter "Wolfman" Washington, who played guitar on the album. "You Don't Miss Your Water" is a cover of the William Bell song. "Never Alone" is a duet with Aaron Neville. "Looking Back" was written by Brook Benton. Adams became familiar with "Now You Know" through Little Willie John.

== Critical reception ==
Professional ratings
Review scores
Source	Rating
AllMusic	4.5/5 stars
The Austin Chronicle	4/5 stars
Los Angeles Daily News	3.5/4 stars

The Los Angeles Daily News wrote that the album finds Adams "in stirring voice, singing as beautifully as ever and maintaining the high standard of excellence in terms of both musicianship and material he set years ago." The Orlando Sentinel noted that Adams's "tone is powerfully earthy and rich, and the high notes rise as naturally as columns of smoke." The Evening Post deemed Man of My Word "a classic soul album." The Vancouver Sun praised the "funky" "Going Out on My Mind Sale". JazzTimes determined that Adams "sings with pure, soul-stirring emotion ... [he] is back in classic belting form." The Washington Post concluded that "Never Alone" is "a gorgeous gospel lullaby for those on the brink of Heaven... A swan song has never sounded so sweet."

== Track listing ==
No.	Title	Length
1.	"Even Now"
2.	"It Ain't the Same Thing"
3.	"This Time I'm Gone for Good"
4.	"Going Out of My Mind Sale"
5.	"Now You Know"
6.	"Up and Down World"
7.	"I Don't Want to Know"
8.	"Man of My Word"
9.	"You Don't Miss Your Water"
10.	"Bulldog Break His Chain"
11.	"It Tears Me Up"
12.	"Looking Back"
13.	"Never Alone"

== Personnel ==
- Guitar: Michael Toles, Walter "Wolfman" Washington
- Bass: George Porter Jr.
- Keyboards: David Torkanowsky
- Saxophone: Jim Spake
- Brass: Craig Klein, Scott Thompson
- Drums: Donnell Spencer Jr.
- Backing vocals: Charles Elam III, Elaine Foster, Aaron Neville
