= Harper Valley PTA =

"Harper Valley P.T.A."
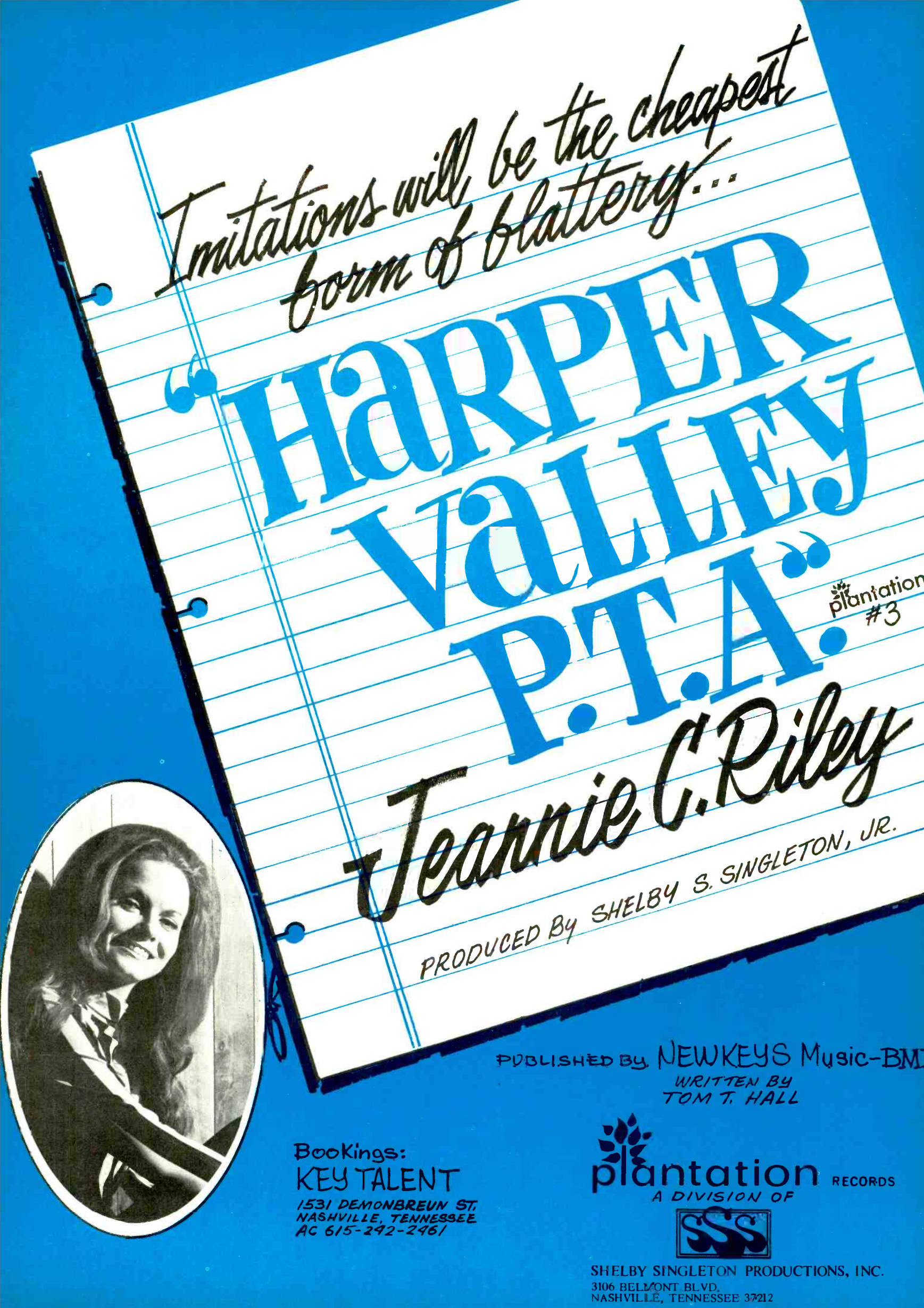
- Billboard advertisement, August 17, 1968

Single by Jeannie C. Riley

from the album Harper Valley P.T.A.
- B-side: "Yesterday All Day Long Today"
- Published: October 28, 1968 by Newkeys Music, Inc. (original copyright December 26, 1967)
- Released: August 1968
- Studio: Columbia (Nashville, Tennessee)
- Genre: Country, country pop
- Length: 3:16
- Label: Plantation
- Songwriter: Tom T. Hall
- Producer: Shelby Singleton

Jeannie C. Riley singles chronology
"Harper Valley P.T.A." (1968)	"The Girl Most Likely" (1968)

Official audio
- "Harper Valley P.T.A." on YouTube

"Harper Valley P.T.A." is a country song written by Tom T. Hall, which in 1968 became a major international hit single for country singer Jeannie C. Riley. Riley's debut single sold more than six million copies, and marked the first time that a single by a woman topped both Billboard's Hot Country Singles chart and the Hot 100 — a feat that would not be repeated until 13 years later when "9 to 5" by Dolly Parton, who also recorded "Harper Valley P.T.A" for her own 1969 album, topped both charts in 1981. It was also Riley's only Top 40 pop hit in the USA.

Publisher Newkeys Music, Inc. filed the original copyright on December 26, 1967, which was revised on October 28, 1968, to reflect new lyrics added by Hall.

Nashville studio musician-producer Jerry Kennedy played the dobro prominently on the record.

== Story ==
The focus of the song's narrative is Mrs. Johnson, whose teenage daughter attends Harper Valley Junior High. The girl comes home one day with a note for her mother from the local PTA, criticizing Mrs. Johnson for wearing short dresses and spending her nights drinking in the company of men. The note closes with a statement by the PTA that she should do a better job of raising her daughter.

During a PTA meeting that afternoon, Mrs. Johnson barges in unannounced, wearing a miniskirt, and reveals a long list of the members' private indiscretions:

- Bobby Taylor, who has repeatedly asked Mrs. Johnson out on a date and whose wife is hinted to be committing adultery while he is away
- Mr. Baker, whose secretary had to leave town for an undisclosed reason
- Widow Jones, who leaves her window shades up and little to onlookers' imaginations
- Mr. Harper, absent from the meeting due to the aftereffects of a recent drinking binge
- Shirley Thompson, who also has a drinking problem, as evidenced by gin on her breath

Mrs. Johnson rebukes the PTA for having the nerve to call her an unfit mother, comparing the town to Peyton Place and labeling the members as hypocrites.

In the final lines, the narrator reveals that Mrs. Johnson is her mother.

== Cultural references ==
The final line of the song ("..the day my mama 'socked it to' the Harper Valley PTA") was a reference to "Sock it to me!", a very popular catch-phrase frequently used in Rowan & Martin's Laugh-In. According to Shelby Singleton, producer of Riley's record, this line was changed at the last minute, at the suggestion of his "wife at the time".

== Inspiration ==
In 2005, Hall noted that he had witnessed a similar scenario when he was a child in Olive Hill, Kentucky, in the mid-1940s; the mother of one of Hall's classmates had drawn the ire of local school board members for her modern ways, and the school was taking out their frustrations on her daughter. The mother gave a verbal tongue-lashing at the school, an iconoclastic move that was unheard of at the time.

== Legacy ==
Riley, who was working as a secretary in Nashville for Jerry Chesnut, got to hear the song and recorded it for Shelby Singleton's independent Plantation Records label. It became a massive hit for her. The single debuted at no. 81 on Billboard's Hot 100 in the issue dated August 24, 1968. Its second-week jump to no. 7 was the decade's highest climb into that chart's Top Ten. "Harper Valley PTA" spent one week at number one on the Hot 100 and was RIAA-certified gold on August 26, 1968, before it reached number one. The single spent four weeks at number two, three of those stuck behind the Beatles' blockbuster hit "Hey Jude". The record spent three weeks at number one on Billboard's country chart In March 1969 Riley's version won her a Grammy for the Best Country Vocal Performance, Female. Her recording was also nominated for "Record of the Year" — losing to "Mrs. Robinson" — and Tom T. Hall was nominated for overall "Song of the Year", losing to "Little Green Apples". In 2019, the 1968 recording of the song by Riley on Plantation Records was inducted into the Grammy Hall of Fame.

The song later inspired an eponymous 1978 motion picture and short-lived 1981 television series, both starring Barbara Eden.

== Sequel ==
In 1984, Riley recorded a sequel song, "Return to Harper Valley",

== Cover versions ==
The song has been covered by many artists, including Billie Jo Spears, Loretta Lynn, Dolly Parton, Lynn Anderson and Martina McBride. Country music singer Billy Ray Cyrus was one of the few men to have recorded a cover version. The song from his 1996 album Trail of Tears tells the story from a man's point of view.

A cover with new lyrics written and performed by Tammy Faye Bakker, titled "The Ballad of Jim & Tammy", was released in 1987. The lyrics describe how Jerry Falwell took control of the PTL Satellite Network and Heritage USA theme park after Jim Bakker's downfall.

== Critical reception ==
In 2024, Rolling Stone ranked the song at #78 on its 200 Greatest Country Songs of All Time ranking.

== Foreign translations ==
"Harper Valley PTA" was translated by Terje Mosnes into Norwegian as "Fru Johnsen" (lit. 'Mrs. Johnsen'). A recording by Inger Lise Rypdal was released in 1968. It charted for 16 weeks, peaking at first place, which it held for nine weeks in a row. However, the song faced controversy over its lyrics as they discussed double standards in the Christian milieu, leading to serious debate over the song in the Storting (Norwegian Parliament).

Stig Anderson wrote a Swedish version titled "Fröken Fredriksson" ("Miss Fredriksson"), which was recorded by Hootenanny Singers and Björn Ulvaeus in 1968. This version tells the story of a woman who leaves town after having her reputation ruined by nosy and hypocritical neighbors. Another Swedish version, titled "Hem & skola VVB" was written and performed by Anna-Lena Brundin (1998).

== Charts ==
=== Weekly charts ===
Jeannie C. Riley

Chart (1968)	Peak position
Australia (Kent Music Report)	1
Canadian RPM Country Tracks	1
Canadian RPM Top Singles	1
New Zealand (Listener)	13
South Africa (Springbok Radio)	11
UK Singles Chart	12
US Billboard Hot Country Singles	1
US Billboard Hot 100	1
US Billboard Easy Listening	4
US Cash Box Top 100	1

Sheelah Mack cover

Chart (1968)	Peak position
Ireland (IRMA)	20

=== Year-end charts ===
Chart (1968)	Rank
Australia	19
Canada	9
US Billboard Hot 100	11
US Cash Box Top 100	12

== See also ==
- Harper Valley PTA
- Harper Valley PTA (TV series)
- Ode to Billie Joe
