= Narvel Felts =

American country singer

- Born: Albert Narvel Felts; November 11, 1938 (age 87); Keiser, Arkansas, U.S.
- Origin: Bernie, Missouri, U.S.
- Genres: Country, Rockabilly
- Occupation: Singer
- Instrument: Guitar
- Years active: 1957–present (Local performances only)

Albert Narvel Felts (born November 11, 1938) is an American country music and rockabilly singer. Known for his soaring tenor and high falsetto, Felts enjoyed his greatest success during the 1970s, most famously 1975's "Reconsider Me".

== Early life and education ==
Felts was born on November 11, 1938 in Keiser, Arkansas, United States, to Lena Cleo Felts and Albert Franklin Felts and raised in Bernie, Missouri, where he attended Bernie High School.

Felts was discovered during a talent show at the school. He had been encouraged to participate in the show by some of his classmates, and a talent agent happened to be attending the performance at the time.

== Career ==
Felts recorded his first single, "Kiss-a Me Baby", at the age of 18, and his career skyrocketed with the help of Roy Orbison and Johnny Cash. Felts enjoyed modest pop success in 1960 with a remake of the Drifters' "Honey Love", which earned a low position on the Billboard Hot 100. He went on to release such songs as "Lonely Teardrops" and "Pink And Black Days", but he did not begin enjoying success on a national level as a country singer until the 1970s. His first major hit came in 1973, with a cover of Dobie Gray's "Drift Away". Felts' version – number eight on the Billboard Hot Country Singles chart in September 1973 – was midtempo country compared to Gray's blues version. The follow-up single, "All in the Name of Love", just missed hitting the top 10 in December 1973.

Felts continued to enjoy modest success during the next year and a half, when he signed with ABC-Dot Records in 1975. That year, he enjoyed his biggest hit, a cover of Johnny Adams' soul classic "Reconsider Me", which showcased his falsetto and high tenor. The song reached number two that August, and was 1975's second-biggest country hit of the year.

Felts, who became known to fans as "Narvel the Marvel", continued to enjoy success throughout the 1970s. Included in his streak of hits was a remake of "Lonely Teardrops", which became his last top-10 hit in the summer of 1976, and a cover of Willie Nelson's "Funny How Time Slips Away". He also had a number-14 country hit with "Everlasting Love" in 1979.

Narvel Felts' pioneering contribution to the genre has been recognized by the Rockabilly Hall of Fame.

== Personal life ==
Felts married to Loretta (nee Stanfield) and they had two children. They lost their only son, Albert Narvel Jr. (known as Bub), aged 31 on September 14, 1995 in an automobile accident. At one time, Bub played drums for Felts. One of Felts' albums is dedicated to him.

Felts resides in Malden, Missouri and continues to perform on occasion.

== Discography ==
=== Albums ===
Year	Album	US Country	Label
1973	Drift Away	30	Cinnamon
1974	When Your Good Love Was Mine	41	Cinnamon
1975	Narvel Felts	4	ABC/Dot
1975	Greatest Hits Vol. 1	20	ABC/Dot
1976	Narvel the Marvel	10	ABC/Dot
1976	Doin' What I Feel	26	ABC/Dot
1977	The Touch of Felts	30	ABC/Dot
1977	Narvel	—	ABC/Dot
1978	Inside Love	—	ABC
1979	One Run for the Roses	49	ABC

=== Singles ===
Year	Single	Chart Positions			Album
Year	Single	US Country	US	CAN Country	Album
1957	"Foolish Thoughts"	—	—	—	singles only
1957	"Cry, Baby, Cry"	—	—	—	singles only
1958	"Rocket Ride"	—	—	—	singles only
1958	"Rocket Ride Stroll"	—	—	—	singles only
1958	"Vada Lou"	—	—	—	singles only
1959	"Cutie Baby"	—	—	—	singles only
1960	"Honey Love"	—	90	—	singles only
1960	"Tony"	—	—	—	singles only
1960	"3000 Miles"	—	—	—	singles only
1962	"Little Miss Blue"	—	—	—	singles only
1962	"Lovelight Man"	—	—	—	singles only
1963	"Mountain of Love"	—	—	—	singles only
1964	"Four Seasons of Life"	—	—	—	singles only
1965	"You Were Mine"	—	—	—	singles only
1965	"Night Creature"	—	—	—	singles only
1965	"Your True Love"	—	—	—	singles only
1966	"Girl Come Back"	—	—	—	singles only
1966	"I'd Trade All of My Tomorrows"	—	—	—	singles only
1967	"86 Miles"	—	—	—	singles only
1967	"Don't Let Me Cross Over"	—	—	—	singles only
1968	"Dee Dee"	—	—	—	singles only
1968	"Since I Met You Baby"	—	—	—	singles only
1973	"Rockin' Little Angel"	—	—	—	Drift Away
1973	"Drift Away"	8	—	48	Drift Away
1973	"All in the Name of Love"	13	—	63	Drift Away
1974	"When Your Good Love Was Mine"	14	—	14	When Your Good Love Was Mine
1974	"Until the End of Time" (w/ Sharon Vaughn)	39	—	—	single only
1974	"I Want to Stay"	26	—	35	Greatest Hits Vol. 1
1974	"Raindrops"	33	—	—	Greatest Hits Vol. 1
1975	"Reconsider Me"	2	67	1	Narvel Felts
1975	"Funny How Time Slips Away"	12	—	45	Narvel Felts
1975	"Somebody Hold Me (Until She Passes By)"	10	—	27	Narvel the Marvel
1976	"Lonely Teardrops"	5	62	5	Narvel the Marvel
1976	"My Prayer"	14	—	—	Doin' What I Feel
1976	"My Good Thing's Gone"	20	—	—	Doin' What I Feel
1977	"The Feeling's Right"	19	—	26	The Touch of Felts
1977	"I Don't Hurt Anymore"	37	—	38	The Touch of Felts
1977	"To Love Somebody"	22	—	—	Narvel
1977	"Please"	34	—	—	Narvel
1978	"Blue Darlin'"	flip	—	—	Narvel
1978	"Runaway"	30	—	—	Narvel
1978	"Just Keep It Up"	31	—	25	Inside Love
1978	"One Run for the Roses"	26	—	38	One Run for the Roses
1979	"Everlasting Love"	14	—	7	One Run for the Roses
1979	"Moment by Moment"	43	—	37	singles only
1979	"Tower of Strength"	33	—	26	singles only
1979	"Because of Losing You"	73	—	—	singles only
1981	"Louisiana Lonely"	67	—	—	singles only
1981	"Fire in the Night"	84	—	—	singles only
1982	"I'd Love You to Want Me"	58	—	—	singles only
1982	"Sweet Southern Moonlight"	84	—	—	singles only
1982	"Roll Over Beethoven"	64	—	—	singles only
1982	"Smoke Gets in Your Eyes"	84	—	—	singles only
1982	"You're the Reason"	82	—	—	singles only
1983	"Cry Baby"	52	—	—	singles only
1983	"Anytime You're Ready"	79	—	—	singles only
1983	"Fool"	52	—	—	singles only
1984	"You Lay So Easy on My Mind"	70	—	—	singles only
1984	"Let's Live This Dream Together"	53	—	—	singles only
1984	"I'm Glad You Couldn't Sleep Last Night"	63	—	—	singles only
1985	"Hey Lady"	51	—	—	singles only
1985	"If It Was Any Better (I Couldn't Stand It)"	68	—	—	singles only
1985	"Out of Sight Out of Mind"	71	—	—	singles only
1986	"Rockin' My Angel"	70	—	—	singles only
1987	"When a Man Loves a Woman"	60	—	—	singles only
1988	"I Need Somebody Bad"	—	—	—	singles only
