= Bethany, Louisiana and Texas =

- Unincorporated community
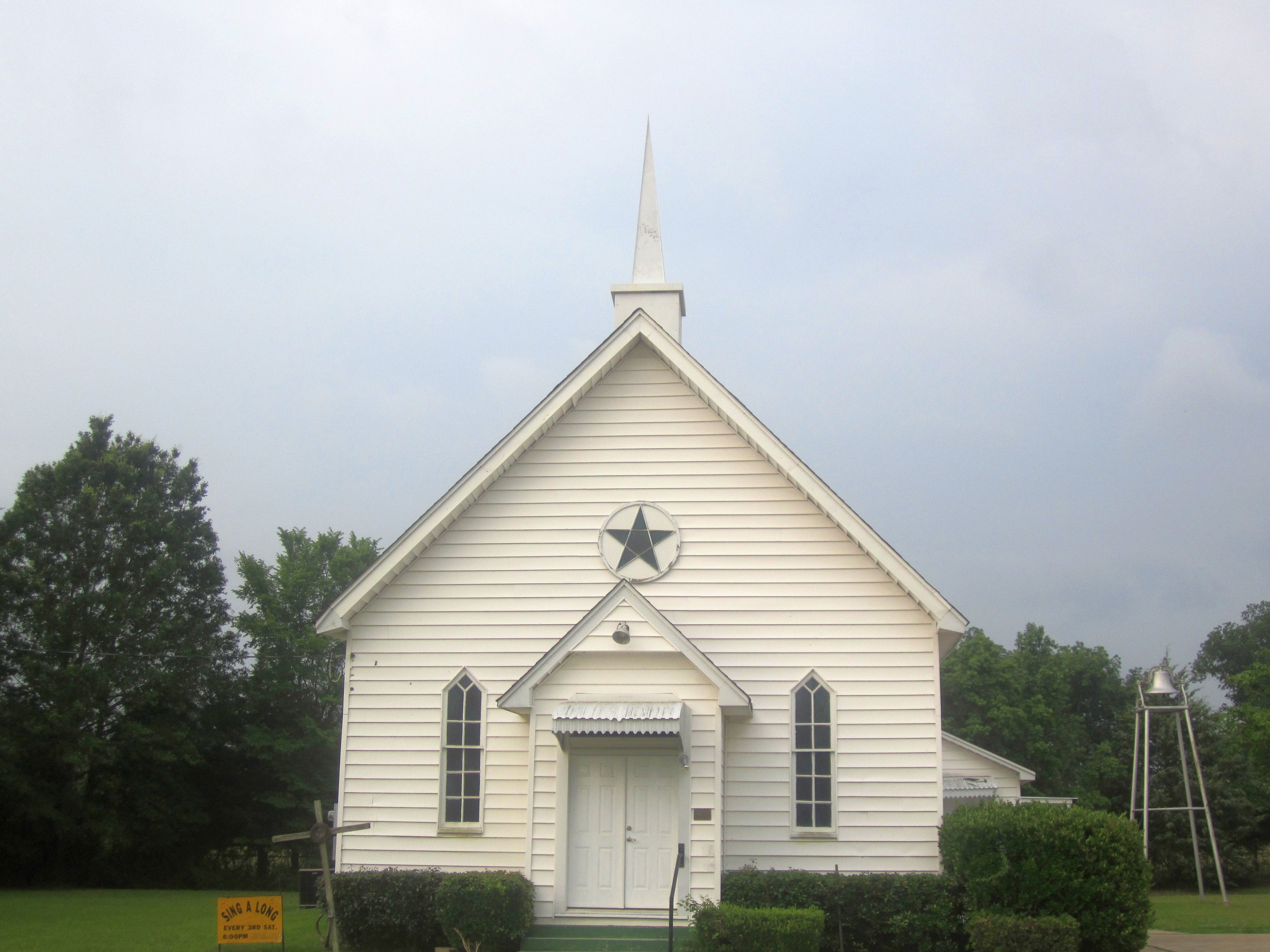
- Bethany United Methodist Church was established in 1899

- Location of Bethany in Louisiana Bethany, Louisiana and Texas (Texas) Bethany, Louisiana and Texas (the United States)
- Coordinates: 32°22′24″N 94°02′34″W
- Country: United States
- State: Louisiana, Texas
- Parish/County: Caddo Parish, Louisiana
- Founded: 1840
- Elevation: 348 ft (106 m)
- Time zone: UTC-6 (CST)
  - Summer (DST): UTC-5 (CDT)
- ZIP code: 71007
- Area code: 318
- GNIS feature ID: 553610

Bethany is an unincorporated community in Caddo Parish, Louisiana and Panola County, Texas United States, on U.S. Route 79. The Caddo Parish portion of the community is part of the Shreveport – Bossier City metropolitan area.

== History ==
Bethany was founded in 1840. It was named after the Bethany Church.

== Geography ==
The northern part of Bethany is located in Caddo Parish. The southern portion is in northeastern Panola County, some 22 miles (35 km) northeast of Carthage.
