= Johnny Adams =

American singer (1932–1998)

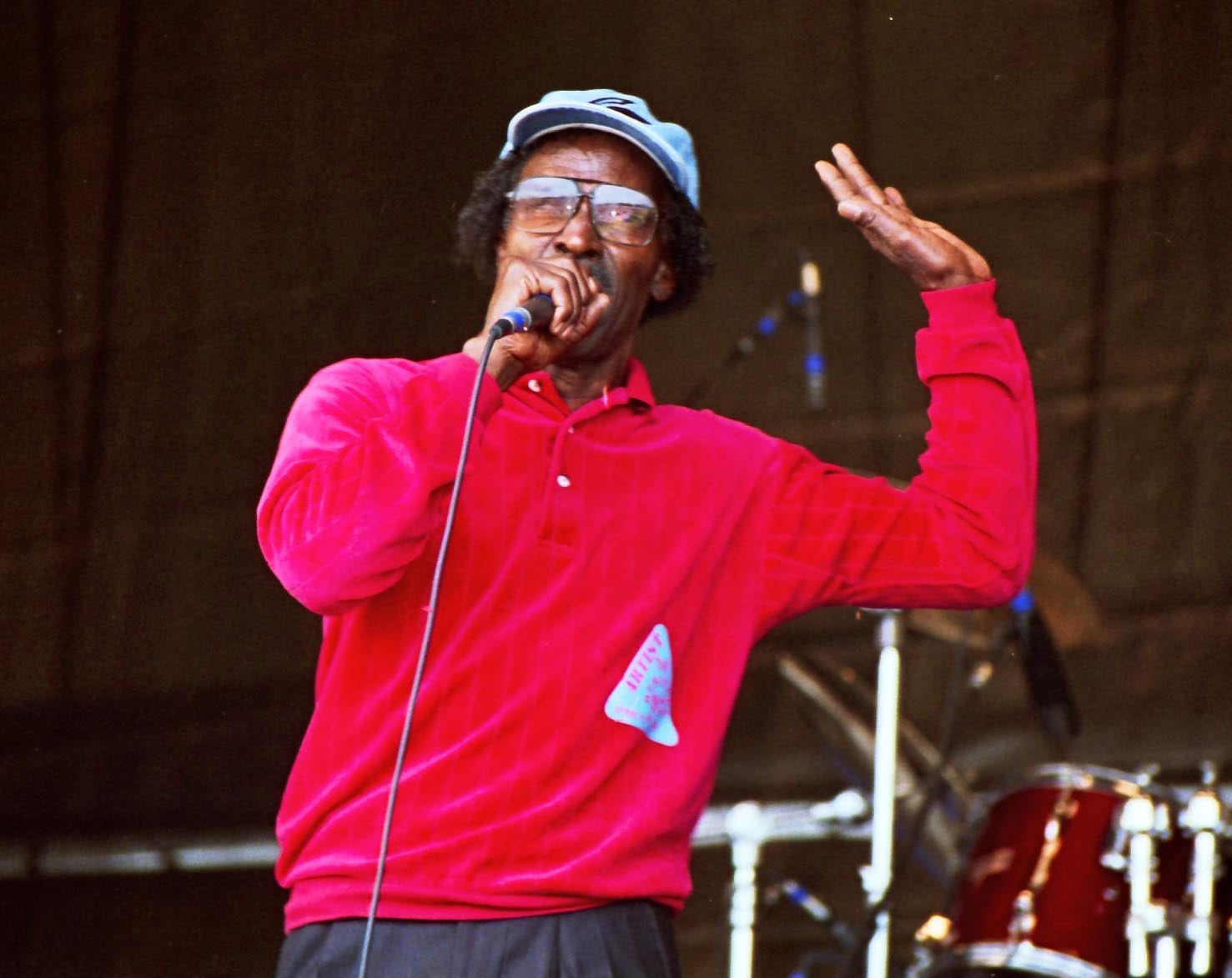
- Adams performing at the 1997 New Orleans Jazz & Heritage Festival

Background information
- Also known as: The Tan Canary
- Born: Laten John Adams, Jr. January 5, 1932
- Origin: New Orleans, Louisiana, U.S.
- Died: September 14, 1998 (aged 66) Baton Rouge, Louisiana, U.S.
- Genres: Gospel, R&B, soul, jazz
- Occupation: Singer
- Years active: c.1950–1998
- Labels: Ric, Gone, Watch, SSS International, Atlantic, Ariola, Rounder

Laten John Adams Jr. (January 5, 1932 – September 14, 1998), was an American blues, jazz and gospel singer, known as "The Tan Canary" for the multi-octave range of his singing voice, his swooping vocal mannerisms and falsetto. His biggest hits were his versions of "Release Me" and "Reconsider Me" in the late 1960s.

== Life and career ==
Adams was born in New Orleans, Louisiana, United States, the oldest of 10 children. He became a professional musician on leaving school. He began his career singing gospel with the Soul Revivers and Bessie Griffin's Consolators, but crossed over to secular music in 1959. His upstairs neighbor, the songwriter Dorothy LaBostrie, supposedly persuaded him to start performing secular music after hearing him sing in the bathtub. He recorded LaBostrie's ballad "Oh Why," released as "I Won't Cry," for Joe Ruffino's Ric label. Produced by the teenaged Mac Rebennack (later known as Dr. John), the record became a local hit. Adams recorded several more singles for the label over the next three years, most of them produced by Rebennack or Eddie Bo. His first national hit came in 1962, when "A Losing Battle", written by Rebennack, reached number 27 on the Billboard R&B chart.

After Ruffino's death in 1963, Adams left Ric and recorded for a succession of labels, including Eddie Bo's Gone Records, the Los Angeles–based Modern Records, and Wardell Quezergue's Watch label. His records had little success until he signed with Shelby Singleton's Nashville–based SSS International Records in 1968. A reissue of "Release Me", originally released by Watch, reached number 34 on the R&B chart and number 82 on the pop chart. Its follow-up, "Reconsider Me", a country song produced by Singleton, became his biggest hit, reaching number 8 on the R&B chart and number 28 on the pop chart in 1969. Two more singles, "I Can't Be All Bad" and a newly recorded version of "I Won't Cry", were lesser hits later the same year. The label also released an album, Heart and Soul, which included the original Ric recording of "I Won't Cry".

Adams left SSS International in 1971 and recorded unsuccessfully for several labels, including Atlantic and Ariola, over the next few years. At the same time, he began performing regularly at Dorothy's Medallion Lounge in New Orleans and touring nightclubs in the south.

In 1983, he signed with Rounder Records, for which he recorded nine critically acclaimed albums produced by Scott Billington, beginning with From the Heart in 1984. These records encompassed a wide range of jazz, blues and R&B styles and highlighted Adams's voice. The albums included tributes to the songwriters Percy Mayfield and Doc Pomus. The jazz-influenced Good Morning Heartache included the work of composers like George Gershwin and Harold Arlen. Other albums in this series are Room with a View of the Blues (1988), Walking on a Tightrope (1989), and The Real Me (1991). These recordings earned him a number of awards, including a W.C. Handy Award. He also toured internationally, with frequent trips to Europe, and worked and recorded with such musicians as Aaron Neville, Harry Connick Jr., Lonnie Smith, and Dr. John.

He died in Baton Rouge, Louisiana, in 1998 after a long battle with prostate cancer.

== Singles (chart hits only) ==
Year	Title	Label & Cat. No.	U.S. Pop	U.S. R&B
1962	"A Losing Battle"	Ric 986	—	27
1968	"Release Me"	SSS International 750 (reissue of Watch 1906)	82	34
1969	"Reconsider Me"	SSS International 770	28	8
1969	"I Can't Be All Bad"	SSS International 780	89	45
1970	"Proud Woman"	SSS International 787	121	—
1970	"I Won't Cry"	SSS International 809 (new version of original 1959 release as Ric 961)	—	41
1978	"After All the Good Is Gone"	Ariola 7701	—	75

== Albums ==
- Heart & Soul (SSS International, 1969)
- I Won't Cry (Ric, 1971)
- A Christmas in New Orleans with Johnny Adams (Ace, 1975)
- Stand By Me (Chelsea, 1976)
- After All the Good Is Gone (Ariola, 1978)
- From the Heart (Rounder, 1984)
- After Dark (Rounder, 1985)
- Room with a View of the Blues (Rounder, 1988)
- Walking on a Tightrope (Rounder, 1989)
- The Real Me: Johnny Adams Sings Doc Pomus (Rounder, 1991)
- Good Morning Heartache (Rounder, 1993)
- The Verdict (Rounder, 1995)
- One Foot in the Blues (Rounder, 1996)
- Man of My Word (Rounder, 1998)
