= Tommy Blake (musician) =

American singer-songwriter

- Born: Thomas LeVan Givens; September 14, 1931; Dallas, Texas, US
- Died: December 24, 1985 (aged 54) Haughton, Louisiana, US
- Genres: Rockabilly; country
- Occupations: Musician, songwriter
- Years active: 1950s–1970s
- Labels: Young; RCA; Sun
- Formerly of: The Rhythm Rebels

Tommy Blake (born Thomas LeVan Givens, September 14, 1931 – December 24, 1985) was an American rockabilly singer and songwriter active in the 1950s to the 1970s. Regarded as a skilled writer, Blake penned several songs that were later recorded by rock and country music artists, including Johnny Horton, George Jones, and Johnny Cash among others. He also achieved modest success as a recording artist for Sun Records, but failed to record a national hit himself, a fact that frustrated Blake later in his life. Retrospectively, he has received praise for his contributions to rockabilly and was inducted in the Rockabilly Hall of Fame.

== Early life ==
Blake was born Thomas LeVan Givens in Dallas, Texas in 1931. He never knew his father nor did he develop a healthy relationship with his mother. His troubles continued into his teen years when Blake was imprisoned on statutory rape charges. In 1951, he joined the United States Marine Corps. During his service, he lost an eye, either, as Blake claimed, while on tour in Korea or more likely during boot camp. While in the Marine Corps, Blake nurtured his ambitions of being a professional musician by frequently singing and playing on the guitar for enlisted men before his discharge.

== Career ==
He pursued his music career further when he settled in Shreveport, Louisiana to work as a deejay for the radio station KTBS and later for KRUS. In 1954, Blake persuaded the Rhythm Rebels, a duo featuring Carl Adams (lead guitar) and Eddie Hall (bass guitar), to operate as his backing group as he began touring on the live circuit and appearing on Southern television programs to gain exposure. On one such program, Louisiana Hayride, Blake closely observed the approach of Elvis Presley whose momentous performance on the show convinced Blake to adopt characteristics of rock and roll. To capitalize on the craze for rockabilly that began to dominate the American charts, Blake recorded his debut single, "Koolit", in 1956. "Koolit" was issued by Young Records in April but it failed to chart.

In 1957, Blake arranged a one-off single deal with RCA Records record producer Chet Atkins in Nashville. Atkins hired a collection of session musicians, including Buddy Killen, Farris Coursey and Floyd Cramer to record the rhythm sections. The single, which included the band originals "Honky Tonk Mind" and "All Night Long", was given the full rockabilly treatment. According to music historian Shane Hughes, the session displayed Blake and the Rhythm Rebels' potential as songwriters; however, Blake attempted to cash-in on "Honkey Tonk Mind" by offering it to Johnny Horton. RCA's competitor Columbia Records quickly released Horton's version in April 1957 under the title "The Woman I Need". Horton enjoyed a Top 10 hit on Billboard's country charts while Blake's rendition was shelved. Under advisement from RCA executives, Atkins released the other two songs recorded from Blake's session, "Freedom" and "Mister Hoody", then nullified his recording contract.

Undeterred, Blake accepted a deal with Sun Records after Sam Philips met him at a disc jockey convention in Memphis. Blake worked at the label's famous RCA Studio B; he is the first recording artist to do so. Sun Records released Blake's single "Flat Foot Sam" on September 14, 1957: it sold well in regional markets and earned Blake his first brush with success. Furthermore, it instilled confidence in Sun Records to bring Blake back for a follow-up recording session that resulted in nine songs. Among the sides was "Ballad of a Broken Heart", his own self-penned composition that was later recorded by Johnny Cash as "Story of a Broken Heart". "Sweetie Pie" and "I Dig You Baby" were paired together for a single in 1958 but it sold poorly. Sensing he had little hope with writing pop songs, Blake struck a songwriting partnership with Jerry Ross to work for country artists.

In 1959, Blake began collaborating with Carl Belew, an already established songwriter who had his first major success with Johnnie and Jack. Together, they achieved their biggest success with "Tender Years". However, they sold the rights to Darrell Edwards who pitched it to George Jones in 1961, taking the song to number one on the country charts. The Blake-Belew partnership is credited with a number of charting hits recorded by Charlie Walker, Stonewall Jackson, Jim Reeves, Del Reeves, and Mel Tillis, among others. Nonetheless, Blake was disenchanted with the music industry, embittered by his inability to record a successful tune himself. He worked for minor labels in the late 1960s before retiring the following decade.

== Personal life ==
Blake suffered from alcoholism throughout the majority of his life. At the age of 54, Blake was murdered by his third wife over marital disputes on Christmas Eve in 1985. He was posthumously inducted into the Rockabilly Hall of Fame.
