= Jeannie C. Riley =

American country music and gospel singer (born 1945)

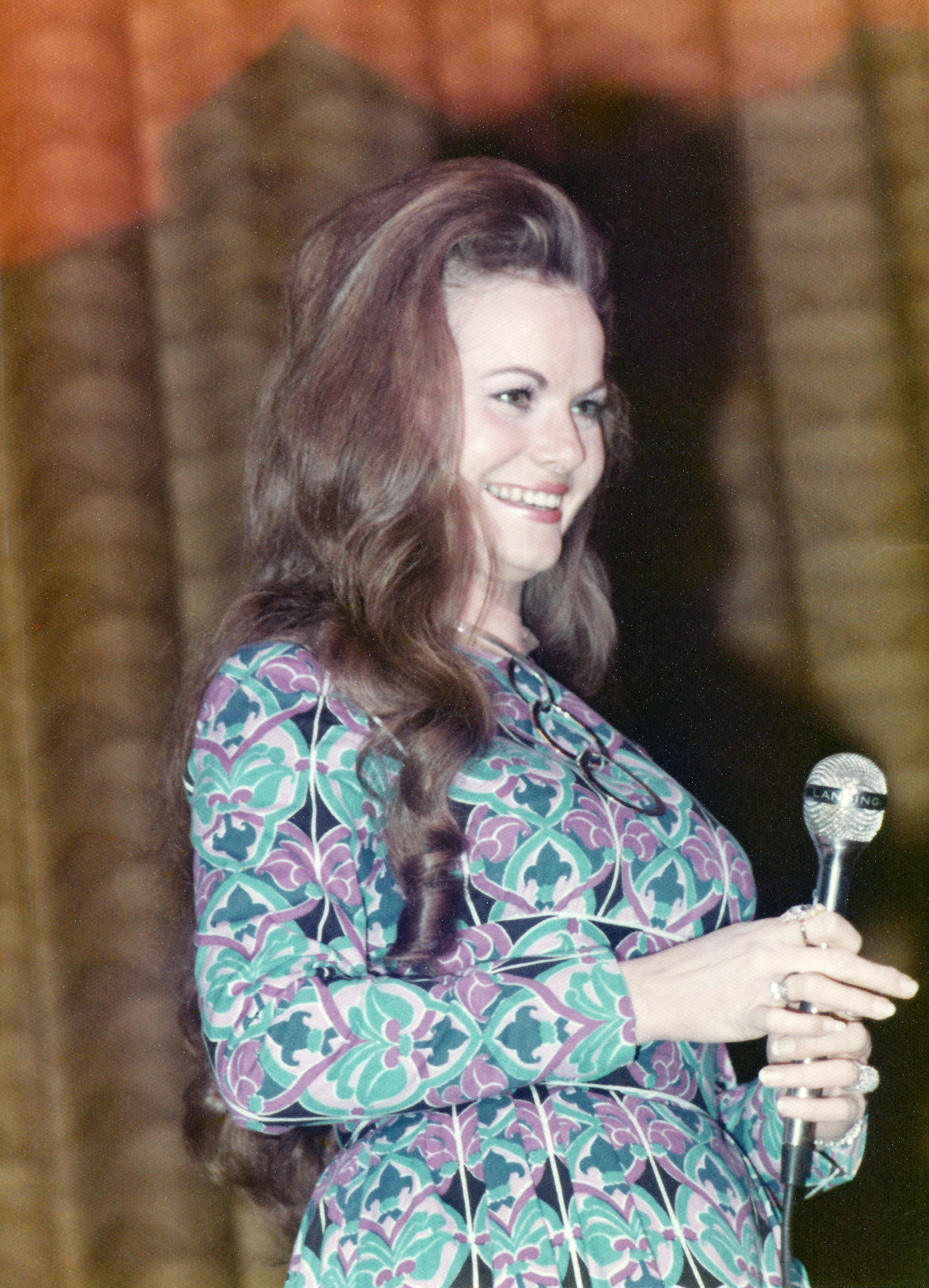
- Riley at the Civic Center in Lansing, Michigan, on February 4, 1973

Background information
- Born: Jeanne Carolyn Stephenson; October 19, 1945 (age 81); Anson, Texas, United States
- Origin: Stamford, Texas, United States
- Genres: Country music, gospel
- Occupation: Singer
- Instrument: Vocals
- Years active: 1967–present
- Labels: Little Darlin Records; Plantation Records; Capitol Records; MGM Records; Mercury Records; Warner Bros. Records; MCA Records

Jeannie C. Riley (born Jeanne Carolyn Stephenson; October 19, 1945) is an American country music and gospel singer. She is best known for her 1968 country and pop hit "Harper Valley PTA", which reached number-one on the Billboard Country and Pop charts.

Riley later saw moderate country music chart action but never again duplicated the success of "Harper Valley PTA". She became a born-again Christian in the mid-1970s and began recording gospel music during the late 1970s.

== Early life and rise to fame ==
Riley was born in Anson, Texas, United States. As a teenager, she married Mickey Riley and gave birth to a daughter on January 11, 1966. The family moved to Nashville, Tennessee, after receiving a letter from Weldon Myrick, who heard a demo tape of Riley's and believed she could be successful. Riley worked as a secretary for Passkey Music in Nashville while recording demos on the side.

Riley's career was stagnant until former Mercury Records producer Shelby Singleton received a demo tape of Riley's voice. Singleton's fledgling label Plantation Records was starting to enjoy success. Seeing potential in the Tom T. Hall demo song "Harper Valley PTA", Singleton worked with Riley to record it. The record quickly became one of the best-known country music songs of all time. Riley was the first woman to top the Billboard pop and country charts with the same song.

== Success of "Harper Valley PTA" ==
"Harper Valley PTA" was released in 1968 and immediately became a hit. It topped the Billboard Hot 100 and Hot Country Songs charts, a feat not repeated by a female artist until Dolly Parton's 1981 hit "9 to 5". The song is about Mrs. Johnson, a widowed woman who confronts members of the PTA after her daughter brings home a note from school critical of her mother's penchant for miniskirts and dating various men. Mrs. Johnson turns the tables on the PTA and exposes its hypocrisy one member at a time, noting that their private behavior is far worse than hers.

Riley became an overnight sensation as the single earned her the Grammy Award for Best Female Country Vocal Performance and was named the Country Music Association Single of the Year. Riley also became one of the few country artists ever nominated in the major pop Grammy Award categories of "Best New Artist" and "Record of the Year". The single sold over five and a half million copies worldwide and was awarded a gold disc by the R.I.A.A. just four weeks after its release. The album of the same name sold over one million units to earn Riley another gold record.

The song's success helped Riley make country music history in 1969 as the first female vocalist to have her own major network variety special, Harper Valley U.S.A., which she hosted with Jerry Reed. The show featured performances by Mel Tillis and the song's writer, Tom T. Hall.

The song spawned a 1978 film and a 1981-82 television series, both titled Harper Valley PTA and starring Barbara Eden as the widow Mrs. Johnson.

== After "Harper Valley PTA" ==
"Ever since 'Harper Valley P.T.A.' this woman has just known soap operas aren't made up, and even in Nashville her accent qualifies her to play the Avenging Hick. The credibility isn't always a virtue, but I'm a sucker for the accent—especially on 'The Girl Most Likely,' in which poor-but-proud-and-how Jeannie gloats over the surprise marriage of that stuck-up Suzie Jane Grout (spelling phonetic)."

— Review of Jeannie C. Riley's Greatest Hits in Christgau's Record Guide: Rock Albums of the Seventies (1981)

During the late 1960s and into the very early 1970s, Riley ranked among the most popular female vocalists in the country music industry. She had five Grammy Award nominations and four Country Music Association nominations, and performed a duet with Loretta Lynn. She had success on the country charts again, but on a lesser scale.

Other hits following "Harper Valley PTA" include "The Girl Most Likely," "There Never Was A Time," "The Rib," "The Back Side of Dallas," "Country Girl," "Oh Singer," and "Good Enough to Be Your Wife."

Riley became known as much for her sex appeal and beauty as for her music, foreshadowing Shania Twain and other contemporary female vocalists by nearly three decades. At a time when many country queens were keeping a wholesome image by wearing gingham dresses, Riley kept in tune with typical late-1960s fashion by donning miniskirts and go-go boots for her stage outfits (somewhat in the character of the protagonist in "PTA"). Her mod persona opened doors (and perhaps started a sexual revolution) in country music, as hemlines of other female country artists' stage outfits began rising in the years that followed. But Riley was not comfortable with that image, and she eventually abandoned it for a more traditional wardrobe (floor-length gowns and ankle-length dresses typically worn by other female country artists). In the 1993 CBS documentary, The Woman of Country, she noted that during the "Harper Valley" period, her publicist and manager were largely responsible for creating and playing up her sexy image (matching the character pictured on the "Harper Valley" album cover).

== Late 1970s and the 1980s ==
Riley's success brought a number of offers from Hollywood, and she appeared with Bing Crosby, Dean Martin, Bette Davis, Tom Jones, Ed Sullivan and others on various television programs.

Riley left Plantation Records for MGM Records in 1972, recording several albums, but only two of her singles from the period, "Good Morning Country Rain" and "Give Myself A Party," cracked the top 30. Later stints at Mercury Records and Warner Bros. Records produced only a couple of charted singles, but she remained in demand as a concert artist well into the 1980s.

Riley became a born-again Christian and began recording gospel music in the mid-1970s. As result of her conversion, she distanced herself from "PTA" for a time due to its content. The song remained part of her live set, however, and she still performs it in her shows. She published her 1980 autobiography, From Harper Valley to the Mountain Top, which told the story of pop-music stardom and later move to gospel music. Riley released a gospel album with the same title in 1981.

== Personal life ==
Jeannie and Mickey Riley divorced in 1970 at the height of her career. Following her shift from country music to gospel, they remarried in 1975 and settled in Franklin, Tennessee. After the release of her autobiography, From Harper Valley to the Mountaintop, and a gospel album of the same name in 1980, she suffered a bout of depression and was diagnosed with bipolar disorder. The Rileys divorced again in 1991. Two years later, Mickey moved back in to help Jeannie battle depression—an arrangement that continued until he remarried three years later. Jeannie married Billy Starnes, a childhood friend, in 2012.

Riley sued Big Lots' parent company, Consolidated Stores Corporation, for $250,000 in 2003 after suffering from a fall the previous year. Riley stated that injuries from the fall kept her from performing and resulted in lasting disability. As of July 16, 2026, the case is on a stay while Big Lots is working through the bankruptcy process. The court's most recent order compels Big Lots to file a status report every 90 days.

== Discography ==
=== Albums ===
Year	Album	Chart Positions			RIAA
Year	Album	US Country	US	CAN	RIAA
1968	Harper Valley PTA	1	12	5	Gold
1968	Sock Soul	—	—	—	—
1969	Yearbooks and Yesterdays	9	187	—	—
1969	Things Go Better with Love	14	142	—	—
1970	Country Girl	25	—	—	—
1970	The Generation Gap	34	—	—	—
1971	The Girl Most Likely	—	—	—	—
1971	Greatest Hits	22	—	—	—
1971	Jeannie	34	—	—	—
1972	Give Myself a Party	—	—	—	—
1972	Down to Earth	43	—	—	—
1972	The World of Country	—	—	—	—
1973	When Love Has Gone Away	40	—	—	—
1973	Just Jeannie	—	—	—	—
1977	From Nashville with Love	—	—	—	—
1979	Wings to Fly	—	—	—	—
1980	Greatest Hits Volume Two	—	—	—	—
1981	From Harper Valley to the Mountain Top	—	—	—	—
1984	Total Woman	—	—	—	—
1986	Jeannie C. Riley	—	—	—	—
1991	Here's Jeannie C.	—	—	—	—
1995	Praise Him	—	—	—	—
1995	The Best	—	—	—	—
2000	Good Ol' Country	—	—	—	—
2002	The Very Best of Jeannie C. Riley	—	—	—	—
2013	Harper Valley P.T.A.: The Plantation Recordings 1968-1970	—	—	—	—

=== Singles ===
Year	Single	Peak positions				Album
Year	Single	US Country	US	CAN Country	CAN	Album
1968	"Harper Valley PTA"^{A}	1	1	1	1	Harper Valley PTA
1968	"The Girl Most Likely"	6	55	1	34	Yearbooks and Yesterdays
1969	"The Price I Pay to Stay"	35	—	22	—	Sock Soul
1969	"There Never Was a Time"	5	77	12	76	Things Go Better With Love
1969	"The Rib"	32	111	—	—	Things Go Better With Love
1969	"The Back Side of Dallas"	33	—	—	—	Things Go Better With Love
1970	"Country Girl"	7	106	16	—	Country Girl
1970	"Duty, Not Desire"	21	—	13	—	The Generation Gap
1970	"My Man"	60	—	—	—	The Generation Gap
1971	"Oh, Singer"	4	74	5	62	Jeannie
1971	"Good Enough to Be Your Wife"	7	97	22	67	Jeannie
1971	"Roses and Thorns"	15	—	15	—	Jeannie
1971	"The Lion's Club"	—	—	36	—	—N/a
1971	"Houston Blues"	47	—	—	—	Give Myself a Party
1972	"Give Myself a Party"	12	—	37	—	Give Myself a Party
1972	"Good Morning Country Rain"	30	—	—	—	Down to Earth
1972	"One Night"	57	—	—	—	Down to Earth
1973	"When Love Has Gone Away"	44	—	—	—	When Love Has Gone Away
1973	"Hush"	51	—	—	—	Just Jeannie
1973	"Another Football Year"	57	—	—	—	—N/a
1974	"Missouri"	—	—	—	—	Just Jeannie
1974	"Plain Vanilla" (with The Red River Symphony)	89	—	—	—	—N/a
1976	"The Best I've Ever Had"	94	—	—	—	—N/a
1976	"Pure Gold"	—	—	—	—	—N/a
1977	"Reach for Me"	—	—	—	—	—N/a
1979	"It's Wings That Make Birds Fly"	—	—	—	—	Wings to Fly
1982	"From Harper Valley to the Mountain Top"	—	—	—	—	From Harper Valley to the Mountain Top
1984	"Return to Harper Valley"	—	—	—	—	Total Woman
1991	"Here's to the Cowboys"	—	—	—	—	Here's Jeannie C.
"—" denotes releases that did not chart

- ^{A} "Harper Valley PTA" was certified Gold by the RIAA. "Harper Valley PTA" also made the Adult Contemporary Charts, hitting No. 4. In the UK singles chart, it went to No. 12.

=== Charted B-sides ===
Year	Single	Peak positions			Original A-side
Year	Single	US Country	US	CAN Country	Original A-side
1969	"Things Go Better With Love"	34	111	3	"The Back Side of Dallas"
1970	"The Generation Gap"	62	—	—	"My Man"
"—" denotes releases that did not chart

Note: The single of "Things Go Better With Love" and "The Back Side of Dallas" seems to have been published in several different formats. Some label "Things Go Better..." as the A side while others do not letter the sides. One photo available online of an unlettered single has the "Back Side ..." side stamped "PLUG SIDE". Evidently the label changed its mind at least once about which side to promote.

=== Music videos ===
Year	Video
1991	"Here's to the Cowboys"

== Awards and nominations ==
Year	Award Program	Award	Result
1968	Grammy Awards	Record of the Year, "Harper Valley PTA"	Nominated
1968	Grammy Awards	Best New Artist	Nominated
1968	Grammy Awards	Best Female Country Vocal Performance "Harper Valley PTA"	Won
1968	CMA Awards	Single of the Year, "Harper Valley PTA"	Won
1968	CMA Awards	Album of the Year, "Harper Valley PTA"	Nominated
1968	CMA Awards	Female Vocalist of the Year	Nominated
1969	Grammy Awards	Best Female Country Vocal Performance, "The Back Side of Dallas"	Nominated
1969	CMA Awards	"Female Vocalist of the Year"	Nominated

In 2019, Riley was inducted into the Texas Country Music Hall of Fame.
