= Shelby Singleton =

American record producer and label owner (1931–2009)

Background information
- Born: Shelby Sumpter Singleton, Jr. December 16, 1931; Waskom, Texas, U.S.
- Died: October 7, 2009 (aged 77) Nashville, U.S.
- Genres: Pop, Country
- Occupations: Record producer and record label owner

Shelby Sumpter Singleton, Jr. (December 16, 1931 – October 7, 2009) was an American record producer and record label owner.

== Early life ==
He was born Shelby Sumpter Singleton, Jr. in Waskom, Texas. His parents were Shelby Sumpter Singleton, Sr. and Alvina Marcantel. As a youngster, living in Shreveport, Louisiana, Singleton was known as "Sonny Boy". He graduated from high school at age 15, then attended the Louisiana Business School. After graduating, he joined the Marine Corps and served in the Korean War. He would spend the rest of his life with a metal plate in his head due to an injury suffered while serving there.

== Career ==
After his military discharge he worked in a munitions company, based in Shreveport, Louisiana for five years before being hired in October 1957 to promote Starday Records country music catalog. When a marketing arrangement between Starday and Mercury Records was terminated, Singleton was hired by Mercury to do promotional work. He rose in the company to become a record producer and executive in Mercury's Nashville office. In 1960, he achieved his first hit single, Brook Benton's recording of "The Boll Weevil Song", which became a #2 single on the Billboard Hot 100 chart the following year. Singleton spent nine years at Mercury and its sister label, Smash Records, during which he was involved in producing many hit records, including Leroy Van Dyke's "Walk On By"; "Ahab the Arab" by Ray Stevens; and "Wooden Heart" by Joe Dowell. He was responsible for convincing Roger Miller to sign with Smash Records, where he would have most of his hits of the '60s. Singleton also acted as producer for such artists as Jerry Lee Lewis, Roger Miller, Charlie Rich, Dave Dudley, Brook Benton, and Orion.

In 1962, Singleton bought the master recording of "Hey Paula" by Jill and Ray, originally released on LeCam Records. He changed their names to Paul & Paula and issued the song on Mercury's sister label, Philips Records. The song spent three weeks at number one on the Billboard Hot 100. By 1966, Singleton was vice-president of Mercury, but resigned to form several music labels, including SSS International and Plantation Records. He achieved his first #1 hit in 1968 with Jeannie C. Riley's "Harper Valley PTA". The following year, Singleton purchased Sun Records and its rock and roll catalog from Sam Phillips. From this point onwards, most of his career was dedicated to releasing and repackaging the Sun catalog, much of which was previously unreleased. Singleton was also on the nominating committee of the Hit Parade Hall of Fame.

Singleton was known to find talent in all parts of the country. For example, The Flatlanders were brought to his attention by freelance producer Royce Clark. In 1972 the Flatlanders traveled from Lubbock to Nashville to record with Clark for Singleton's Plantation label. Singleton and Clark worked closely together in later years, finding and recording undiscovered talent which Clark produced for Singleton's Plantation label, such as Ron Daisley and The County Fair from Long Island, New York, consisting of Ron Daisley on guitar and vocals, Bill Black on Bass, Daryl Brooke on pedal steel guitar, John Backerty on electric guitar, and Paul Gelsomine on drums.

== Private life ==
Singleton graduated from Byrd High School in Shreveport, Louisiana at the age of 15. Two years later he married Margaret Ebey, who later rose in the country music scene as Margie Singleton. They had their first child together in 1950.

After 16 years of marriage they divorced. Singleton married three more times and had four children: Stephen, Sidney, Shana, and Stuart; and several grandchildren. He married Barbara MacCollum right before achieving fame with "Harper Valley PTA". Shortly after that they were divorced.

== Death ==
Singleton resided in Nashville, where he died, aged 77, on October 7, 2009, of brain cancer. He had been admitted to St. Thomas Hospital a week earlier after suffering a seizure, according to his longtime friend and associate Jerry Kennedy.

== Bibliography ==
- Cooper, Daniel (1998). "Shelby Singleton". In The Encyclopedia of Country Music. Paul Kingsbury, Editor. New York: Oxford University Press. p. 485, ISBN 978-0195176087

== See also ==
- Shelby Singleton at Find a Grave
