= Happy Journey (album) =

Studio album by Hank Locklin
- Released: January 1962
- Recorded: 1960–61
- Studio: RCA Victor Studio
- Genre: Country; Nashville Sound
- Label: RCA Victor
- Producer: Chet Atkins

Hank Locklin chronology
Please Help Me, I'm Falling (1960)	Happy Journey (1962)	A Tribute to Roy Acuff: The King of Country Music (1962)

Singles from Happy Journey
- 1. "You're the Reason/Happy Birthday to Me" Released: July 1961; 2. "Happy Journey" Released: November 1961

Happy Journey is a studio album by American country singer–songwriter Hank Locklin. It was released in January 1962 via RCA Victor Records and was produced by Chet Atkins. Happy Journey was Locklin's third studio album released in his recording career. It contained a total of 12 tracks, three of which were hits on the country chart: "You're the Reason," "Happy Birthday to Me" and the title track. It included a combination of new recordings and cover versions of songs previously recorded by other artists.

== Background and content ==
In 1960, Hank Locklin had achieved his biggest hit with "Please Help Me, I'm Falling." The song topped the country charts but also became an international hit. From its success, he had several follow-up hits which would also prove to be successful. Several of these hits would be included in Locklin's album, Happy Journey. The sessions for the album took place between 1960 and 1961 in the RCA Studio, located in Nashville, Tennessee. The sessions were produced by Chet Atkins. He had also produced Locklin's two previous studio efforts for the RCA label in 1958 and 1960.

Happy Journey contained a total of 12 tracks, all of which were written by other songwriters. Many of these tracks were cover versions of songs first made famous by other music artists. This included a cover of Bobby Edwards' "You're the Reason," Don Gibson's "I Can't Stop Loving You" and Tex Ritter's "Jealous Heart." Locklin also re-recorded his 1953 hit, "Let Me Be the One," which he first cut for the 4 Star label. New material for the album included the title track, "Happy Birthday to Me" and "Johnny My Love (Grandma's Diary)."

== Release ==
Happy Journey was released in January 1962 on RCA Victor Records. It was Locklin's third studio album issued in his career. The record was distributed as a vinyl LP, containing six tracks on both sides of the record. In total the album contained three singles that were major hits for Locklin. The first to be a hit was "You're the Reason," which was released in July 1961. The single spent 12 weeks on the Billboard Hot Country Songs and peaked at number 14 by November. Its B-side was "Happy Birthday to Me." The song also became a hit in November 1961, peaking at number seven on the Billboard country singles chart. The final single included in the album was its title track, which was released as a single in November 1961. It spent a total of 12 weeks on the Billboard country survey and peaked at number ten on the list in February 1962.

== Track listing ==
Side one
No.	Title	Writer(s)	Length
1.	"Happy Journey"	Charles Nowa; Fred Jacobson; Nicola Wilke	2:30
2.	"Oh How I Miss You (Since You Went Away)"	Pete Cassell	2:17
3.	"I Can't Stop Loving You"	Don Gibson	2:17
4.	"You're the Reason"	Bobby Edwards; Terry Fell; Fred Henley	2:17
5.	"Let Me Be the One"	Paul Blevins; Joe Hobson; W.S. Stevenson	2:37
6.	"Happy Birthday to Me"	Bill Anderson	2:25

Side two
No.	Title	Writer(s)	Length
1.	"I Need You Now"	Jimmie Crane; Al Jacobs	2:30
2.	"I Can See an Angel"	Kay Adelman	2:15
3.	"Jealous Heart"	Jenny Lou Carson	2:47
4.	"The Keeper of the Keys"	Kenny Devine; Lance Guyness; Harlan Howard; Wynn Stewart	2:11
5.	"One Has My Name (The Other Has My Heart)"	Hal Blair; Dixie Dean; Eddie Dean	2:19
6.	"Johnny My Love (Grandma's Diary)"	Felice and Boudleaux Bryant	2:20

== Personnel ==
All credits are adapted from the liner notes of Happy Journey.

Musical personnel

- Floyd Cramer – piano
- Buddy Harman – drums
- Hank Garland – guitar
- The Jordanaires – background vocals
- Anita Kerr – accordion
- The Anita Kerr Singers – background vocals
- Hank Locklin – lead vocals
- Dutch McMillin – saxophone
- Bob Moore – bass
- Velma Smith – guitar
- Gordon Stoker – accordion

Technical personnel

- Chet Atkins – producer
- Archie Campbell – liner notes
- Bill Porter – engineer

== Release history ==
Region	Date	Format	Label	Ref.
Canada	January 1962	Vinyl	RCA Victor	
Germany	January 1962	Vinyl	RCA Victor	
United States	January 1962	Vinyl	RCA Victor	
