= Happy Birthday to Me (Hank Locklin song) =

Single by Hank Locklin

from the album Happy Journey
- A-side: "You're the Reason"
- Released: July 1961
- Recorded: March 14, 1961
- Studio: RCA Victor Studio
- Genre: Country; Nashville Sound
- Length: 2:25
- Label: RCA Victor
- Songwriter: Bill Anderson
- Producer: Chet Atkins

Hank Locklin singles chronology
"From Here to There to You" (1961)	"Happy Birthday to Me" (1961)	"Happy Journey" (1962)

"Happy Birthday to Me" is a song written by Bill Anderson that was originally recorded by American country singer–songwriter Hank Locklin. In 1961, it was released as a single and became a top ten hit on the American country chart that year. It would later be released on Locklin's 1962 studio album Happy Journey.

== Background, release and chart performance ==
In 1960, Hank Locklin had the biggest hit single of his career with the song "Please Help Me, I'm Falling." The song became his second to top the country charts and also crossed over into the pop market, becoming a top ten hit there. Its success elevated Locklin's career and he had further fits after the single. These further hits included "One Step Ahead of My Past" and "Happy Journey" and "Happy Birthday to Me." The song was composed by Bill Anderson, who had written several major hits for other country performers and was a singer in his own right. The track was recorded on March 14, 1961 at the RCA Victor Studio, located in Nashville, Tennessee. The session was produced by Chet Atkins, Locklin's long-time producer at RCA Records.

"Happy Birthday to Me" was released as a single in July 1961 on RCA Victor Records. The single was released as a seven-inch RPM record and was actually the B-side of the actual single release. On the A-side was Locklin's cover of "You're the Reason." The song spent a total of 14 weeks on the Billboard Hot Country and Western Sides chart, peaking at number seven in November 1961. The song became Locklin's ninth top ten hit on the country singles chart. He would not have another top ten hit until 1968's "The Country Hall of Fame." It was later released on Locklin's 1962 studio album, also titled Happy Journey.

== Track listing ==
7 inch vinyl single

- "You're the Reason" – 2:17
- "Happy Birthday to Me" – 2:25

== Chart performance ==
Chart (1961–62)	Peak position
US Hot Country Songs (Billboard)	7
