= Happy Journey =

Happy Journey may refer to:

- Happy Journey (album), a 1962 album by Hank Locklin
  - "Happy Journey" (song)
- Happy Journey (1943 film)
- Happy Journey (2014 Malayalam film)
- Happy Journey (2014 Marathi film)
- Happy Journey (2025 film), Telugu language film
