= Irish Songs, Country Style =

Studio album by Hank Locklin
- Released: January 1964
- Recorded: October 1963
- Studio: RCA Victor Studio
- Genre: Country; Nashville Sound
- Label: RCA Victor
- Producer: Chet Atkins

Hank Locklin chronology
The Ways of Life (1963)	Irish Songs, Country Style (1964)	Hank Locklin Sings Hank Williams (1964)

Irish Songs, Country Style is a studio album by American country singer–songwriter Hank Locklin. It was released in January 1964 via RCA Victor Records and was produced by Chet Atkins. Irish Songs, Country Style was a collection of traditional Irish songs recorded in a country fashion. It was one of several concept albums Locklin recorded during the course of his career. The album was largely inspired by his popularity in Ireland.

== Background and content ==
By the early 1960s, Hank Locklin had become a successful recording artist. He had several major hits, including "Please Help Me, I'm Falling," "Geisha Girl" and "Send Me the Pillow That You Dream On." Many of these hits also became successful in Europe, particularly in the United Kingdom and Ireland. In 1963, he embarked on a successful tour of Ireland where his shows drew large crowds. Locklin became so successful in Ireland, that he became inspired to record an album of traditional Irish songs. Locklin was also of Irish descent and believed the album would pay tribute to ancestry.

Locklin recorded the album once returning to the United States. The sessions were cut in Nashville, Tennessee at the RCA Victor Studio. It was produced by Chet Atkins, who had also recorded Locklin's previous seven albums. The session musicians chosen for the recorded were part of The Nashville A-Team, which included Floyd Cramer, Grady Martin and The Jordanaires. Irish Songs, Country Style was a collection of twelve tracks, all of which were traditional Irish songs recorded in a country fashion. Songs on the album included "The Old Bog Road," "Danny Boy" and "Galway Bay."

== Release and reception ==
Professional ratings
Review scores
Source	Rating
Allmusic	2.5/5 stars
Record Mirror	3/5 stars

Irish Songs, Country Style was released in January 1964 via RCA Victor Records. It was Locklin's eighth studio release in his career. The project was distributed as a vinyl LP, containing six songs on either side of the record. No known singles were spawned from the album, unlike Locklin's previous studio releases. In later years, it received a less favorable rating from Allmusic, who only gave it 2.5 out of 5 stars. It was later released on a compact disc as part of a two-disc compilation set that also included various songs from his years at RCA Victor. This particular compilation received a favorable response from reviewer, Steve Leggett, who praised Locklin's voice and musical legacy. "Possessing a clear tenor voice and a knack as a songwriter for emotionally direct and deceptively simple songs, Hank Locklin was a bridge between country's rustic honky tonk roots and the lusher, modern pop sound of country that Nashville ushered in during the 1960s," he commented.

== Track listing ==
=== Vinyl version ===
Side one
No.	Title	Writer(s)	Length
1.	"The Old Bog Road"	Teresa Brayton; Madeline King O'Farrelly	2:57
2.	"Too-Ra-Loo-Ra-Loo-Ral"	James Royce Shannon	3:00
3.	"Danny Dear"	Frederick O'Donovan	3:00
4.	"If Only We Had Ireland Over Here"	Traditional	2:46
5.	"I'll Take You Home Again, Kathleen"	Thomas Paine Westendorf	2:14
6.	"My Wild Irish Rose"	Chauncey Olcott	2:09

Side two
No.	Title	Writer(s)	Length
1.	"Danny Boy"	Frederic Weatherly	2:24
2.	"When Irish Eyes Are Smiling"	George Graff Jr.; Olcott	2:19
3.	"A Little Bit of Heaven"	R. Eli Ball; Joseph Keirn Brennan	2:20
4.	"Galway Bay"	Arthur Colahan	2:40
5.	"Kevin Barry"	Unknown	2:30
6.	"Forty Shades of Green"	Johnny Cash	2:59

=== Digital version ===
Irish Songs, Country Style
No.	Title	Writer(s)	Length
1.	"The Old Bog Road"	Brayton; King O'Farrelly	2:57
2.	"Too-Ra-Loo-Ra-Loo-Ral"	Royce Shannon	3:00
3.	"Danny Dear"	O'Donovan	3:00
4.	"If Only We Had Ireland Over Here"	Traditional	2:46
5.	"I'll Take You Home Again, Kathleen"	Thomas Paine Westendorf	2:14
6.	"My Wild Irish Rose"	Olcott	2:09
7.	"Danny Boy"	Weatherly	2:24
8.	"When Irish Eyes Are Smiling"	Graff; Olcott	2:19
9.	"A Little Bit of Heaven"	Ball; Brennan	2:20
10.	"Galway Bay"	Colahan	2:40
11.	"Kevin Barry"	Unknown	2:30
12.	"Forty Shades of Green"	Cash	2:59

== Personnel ==
All credits are adapted from the liner notes of Irish Songs, Country Style.

Musical personnel

- Brenton Banks – strings
- George Binkley – strings
- Cecil Brower – strings
- Floyd Cramer – piano
- Ray Edenton – guitar
- Lillian Hunt – strings
- The Jordanaires – background vocals
- Jerry Kennedy – guitar
- Buddy Harman – drums
- Grady Martin – guitar
- Booker Rowe – strings

Technical personnel

- Chet Atkins – producer
- Bill Porter – engineer

== Release history ==
Region	Date	Format	Label	Ref.
Canada	January 1964	Vinyl	RCA Victor	
Germany	January 1964	Vinyl	RCA International	
United Kingdom	January 1964	Vinyl	RCA Victor	
United States	January 1964	Vinyl	RCA Victor	
United States	2010s	Music download; Streaming	Sony Music Entertainment	
