= Hank Locklin (1962 album) =

Studio album by Hank Locklin
- Released: March 1962
- Recorded: 1955–1960
- Studio: RCA Victor Studio
- Genre: Country; Nashville Sound
- Label: RCA Camden
- Producer: Chet Atkins; Steve Sholes

Hank Locklin chronology
A Tribute to Roy Acuff: The King of Country Music (1962)	Hank Locklin (1962)	This Song Is Just for You (1963)

Singles from Hank Locklin
- 1. "A Good Woman's Love" Released: February 1956; 2. "Seven or Eleven" Released: June 1956; 3. "She's Better Than Most" Released: October 1956; 4. "Fourteen Karat Gold" Released: January 1957; 5. "From Here to There to You" Released: April 1961

Hank Locklin is a self-titled studio album by American country singer–songwriter Hank Locklin. It was released in March 1962 via RCA Camden records. It was Locklin's first album released on the RCA Camden label was co-produced by Chet Atkins and Steve Sholes. The album was Locklin's fifth proper studio effort, which compiled a handful of songs previously not released on albums. A total of 12 tracks were contained on the record. This included 1961 hit, "From Here to There to You."

== Background and content ==
Hank Locklin signed to RCA Records in 1955 and recorded for three years before a studio album was issued. However, it would be several more years before the release of another proper studio release. RCA began releasing more Locklin albums by the early 1960s after he had further success with the crossover hit, "Please Help Me, I'm Falling." Albums were released on RCA Victor and its budget label, RCA Camden. His 1961 self-titled album was his first to be issued on RCA Camden. A total of twelve tracks were included on the album.

The tracks were taken from sessions recorded between 1955 and 1960. None of the material had previously been issued on albums. The album's earliest sessions between 1955 and 1956 were produced by Steve Sholes, who originally signed Locklin to the RCA label. Beginning in late 1956, the songs were produced by Chet Atkins. The self-titled LP contained two tracks composed by Locklin: "First Time" and "The Same Sweet Girl." The latter was a re-recording of the original 1949 hit. Other songs on the LP were composed by songwriters such as Cy Coben and Cindy Walker.

== Release and reception ==
Locklin's self-titled album was released in March 1962 via RCA Camden. It was Locklin's fifth studio album in his career. The album was originally released as a vinyl LP, containing six songs on each side of the record. The record contained five singles. The earliest single was "A Good Woman's Love," which was first issued in February 1956. The second single, "Seven or Eleven," was issued in June 1956. The third single was "She's Better Than Most," which was issued in October 1956. In January 1957, "Fourteen Karat Gold" was issued as a single. None of these songs made any national Billboard charts.

The final single included was "From Here to There to You." It was originally issued in April 1961 on RCA Victor Records. The single spent seven weeks on the Billboard Hot Country and Western Sides chart before peaking at number 12 in June 1961. The LP was given a favorable rating from Allmusic, receiving four out of five possible stars.

== Track listing ==
Side one
No.	Title	Writer(s)	Length
1.	"The First Time"	Hank Locklin
2.	"You Can't Never Tell"	Luke McDaniel
3.	"A Good Woman's Love"	Cy Coben
4.	"Seven or Eleven"	McDaniel
5.	"The Same Sweet Girl"	Locklin
6.	"The Rich and the Poor"	Ted Daffan; Herman Shoss

Side two
No.	Title	Writer(s)	Length
1.	"Fourteen Karat Gold"	Sy Sandler; Eddie Zack
2.	"From Here to There to You"	Pete McKinlay
3.	"I'm a Fool"	Joey Cooper; Al Hagaman
4.	"She's Better Than Most"	Shorty Long
5.	"Love or Spite"	Bill Carver; Coben
6.	"Tonjours Moi (Always Me)"	Cindy Walker

== Personnel ==
All credits are adapted from the liner notes of Hank Locklin.

Musical personnel

- Chet Atkins – guitar
- Floyd Cramer – piano
- Jimmy Day – steel guitar
- Ray Edenton – rhythm guitar
- Hank Garland – guitar
- Buddy Harman – drums
- Tommy Jackson – fiddle
- The Jordanaires – background vocals
- The Anita Kerr Singers – background vocals
- Hank Locklin – lead vocals
- Grady Martin – guitar
- Bob Moore – bass
- Ernie Newton – bass
- Dale Potter – fiddle
- Sam Pruett – guitar
- Jack Shook – rhythm guitar
- Velma Smith – rhythm guitar
- Tommy Vaden – fiddle

Technical personnel

- Chet Atkins – producer
- Steve Sholes – producer

== Release history ==
Region	Date	Format	Label	Ref.
Canada	March 1962	Vinyl	RCA Camden	
United Kingdom	March 1962	Vinyl	RCA Camden	
United States	March 1962	Vinyl	RCA Camden	
