= From Here to There to You =

Single by Hank Locklin

from the album Hank Locklin
- B-side: "This Song Is Just for You"
- Released: April 1961
- Recorded: 1960
- Studio: RCA Victor Studio
- Genre: Country; Nashville Sound
- Length: 2:30
- Label: RCA Victor
- Songwriter(s): Pete McKinlay
- Producer(s): Chet Atkins

Hank Locklin singles chronology
"One Step Ahead of My Past" (1960)	"From Here to There to You" (1961)	"You're the Reason/Happy Birthday to Me" (1961)

"From Here to There to You" is a song written by Pete McKinlay that was originally recorded by American country singer–songwriter Hank Locklin. In 1961, it was released as a single and became a major hit on the American country chart that year. It would later be released on Locklin's self-titled studio album.

== Background, release and chart performance ==
In 1960, Hank Locklin had the biggest hit single of his career with the song "Please Help Me, I'm Falling." The song became his second to top the country charts and also crossed over into the pop market, becoming a top ten hit there. Its success elevated Locklin's career and he had further fits after the single. "From Here to There to You" was one of those songs. It was composed by Pete McKinlay. The song was recorded in 1960 at the RCA Victor Studio, located in Nashville, Tennessee. It was produced by Chet Atkins.

"From Here to There to You" was released as a single in April 1961 on RCA Victor Records. The single was released as a seven-inch RPM record, containing "From Here to There to You" as the A-side and "This Song Is Just for You" as the B-side. The song spent a total of seven weeks on the Billboard Hot Country and Western Sides chart, peaking at number 12 in June 1961. It was later released on Locklin's 1962 studio album, also titled Hank Locklin.

== Track listing ==
7 inch vinyl single

- "From Here to There to You" – 2:30
- "This Song Is Just for You" – 2:38

== Chart performance ==
Chart (1961)	Peak position
UK Singles Chart (The Official Charts Company)	44
US Hot Country Songs (Billboard)	12
