= Plunkett Donaghy =

Irish Gaelic footballer

Personal information
- Born: July 1961 (age 65) Moy, County Tyrone, Northern Ireland
- Occupation: Building Contractor

Sport
- Sport: Gaelic football
- Position: Midfield
Club
- Years: Club
- Moy
Inter-county
- Years: County
- 1982–1994: Tyrone
Inter-county titles
- Ulster titles: 3
- All-Irelands: 0
- All Stars: 1

Plunkett Donaghy is a former Gaelic footballer who played for the Moy club and the Tyrone county team. With his county, Donaghy won three Ulster Senior Football Championship medals (in 1984, 1986 and 1989) and an All Star in 1986. He lives in The Moy, County Tyrone.

== Background ==
Donaghy is one of nine children to Pat and Maisie Donaghy. Donaghy's father Pat played for Moy and Tyrone and was on the county panel when Tyrone won their first-ever Ulster Senior Football Championships in 1956 and 1957. His mother Maisie, originally from Brackaville, was a widely acclaimed Irish folk singer (under the stage name Eileen Donaghy) whose success brought her on tour around the world.

Donaghy is married with six children. His father-in-law is legendary football manager Dessie Ryan, a former footballer for Tyrone and New York who coached Queen's University Belfast to two victories in the Sigerson Cup and is considered one of the most influential men in GAA history.

Plunkett's brother Colm also played for Tyrone. He is a second cousin to two-time All Star winning former Derry footballer Joe Brolly. His mother Maisie was a first cousin of Joe, the grandfather of Brolly, Ann, the mother of Maisie, and Bridget, the mother of Maisie. He is also cousin to Monaghan Defender/Forward Vincent Corey.

== Career ==
Donaghy was part of the Tyrone team that went to their first All-Ireland Senior Football Championship final in 1986, against Kerry, and won an All Star Award for his contributions. He captained Tyrone to a further Ulster Championship success in 1989. He also played for Ireland against Australia.

=== Legacy ===
His playing abilities, being part of the first (relatively) successful Tyrone team, put him among the greats of Tyrone football. Donaghy was known for his great ability to catch a ball, and he was instantly recognisable on the pitch due to his "shaggy" blond hair. Donaghy stands at 6 ft tall.
