= East Side Story =

East Side Story may refer to:

== Film and television ==
- East Side Story, a 1988 film featuring Marc Anthony
- East Side Story, a 1991 episode of the American TV series Beverly Hills, 90210
- East Side Story (1997 film), a 1997 German documentary
- East Side Story (2006 film), a 2006 romantic comedy
- "East Side Story" (Ugly Betty), a 2007 episode of the American TV series Ugly Betty
- "East Side Story", an episode of the American TV series Will & Grace
- East Side Stories, a 2012 Hungarian film

== Music ==
- East Side Story (Squeeze album)
- East Side Story (Kid Frost album)
- East Side Story (Emily King album)
- "East Side Story" (Bob Seger song), 1966
- "East Side Story", a song by Bryan Adams from Room Service
- East Side Story, an American band including Ron Lauback
- an influential series of soul-music compilations affiliated with Lowrider culture

== Literature ==
- East Side Story, a 2004 novel by Louis Auchincloss

== Theatre ==
- An early name for West Side Story used when it still took place on the Lower East Side about a Jewish girl (that became Maria), and an Irish Catholic boy (that became Tony)

== Science ==
- A theory, associated with Yves Coppens, of human evolution in East Africa. Also known as the "Rift Valley theory".

== See also ==
- West Side Story (disambiguation)
- Southside Story (disambiguation)
