= Happy Journey (song) =

Single by Hank Locklin

from the album Happy Journey
- B-side: "I Need You Now"
- Released: November 1961
- Recorded: September 16, 1961
- Studio: RCA Victor Studio
- Genre: Country; Nashville Sound
- Length: 2:30
- Label: RCA Victor
- Songwriter(s): Charles Nowa; Fred Jacobson; Nicola Wilke
- Producer(s): Chet Atkins

Hank Locklin singles chronology
"You're the Reason/Happy Birthday to Me" (1961)	"Happy Journey" (1961)	"We're Gonna Go Fishin'" (1962)

"Happy Journey" is a song written by Charles Nowa, Fred Jacobson and Nicola Wilke. It was originally recorded by American country singer–songwriter Hank Locklin. In 1961, it was released as a single and became a major hit on the American country chart that year. It would later be released on Locklin's studio album of the same name.

== Background, release and chart performance ==
In 1960, Hank Locklin had the biggest hit single of his career with the song "Please Help Me, I'm Falling." The song became his second to top the country charts and also crossed over into the pop market, becoming a top ten hit there. Its success elevated Locklin's career and he had further fits after the single. These further hits included "One Step Ahead of My Past" and "Happy Journey." It was composed by Charles Nowa, Fred Jacobson and Nicola Wilke. The song was recorded on September 16, 1961 at the RCA Victor Studio, located in Nashville, Tennessee. It was produced by Chet Atkins. The song's eventual B-side was recorded during the same studio session.

"Happy Journey" was released as a single in November 1961 on RCA Victor Records. The single was released as a seven-inch RPM record, containing "Happy Journey" as the A-side and "I Need You Now" as the B-side. The song spent a total of 14 weeks on the Billboard Hot Country and Western Sides chart, peaking at number ten in February 1962. The song became Locklin's eighth top ten hit on the country singles chart and his first since the number one success of "Please Help Me, I'm Falling." It was later released on Locklin's 1962 studio album, also titled Happy Journey.

== Track listing ==
7 inch vinyl single

- "Happy Journey" – 2:30
- "I Need You Now" – 2:30

== Chart performance ==
Chart (1961–62)	Peak position
US Hot Country Songs (Billboard)	10
