= Steve Brodie (record executive) =

American record executive

- Born: c. 1927
- Died: March 15, 2004 (aged 77); Westwood, California, U.S.
- Occupations: Record company director, manager, record producer

Steve Brodie (c.1927 – March 15, 2004) was an American record label owner and founder who was very active during the 1960s and 1970s. He owned or co-owned Thunderbird Records, Sahara Records, Forever Music and various others. He also produced recordings for artists.

== Background ==
Part of Brodie's history in the music business includes his work as a promoter. He played a big part in helping "Tragedy" become a hit for Thomas Wayne. During the 1960s, he headed Master's Releasing Corp. His promotion and production work included making "Wild Weekend" for The Rockin' Rebels a hit. In distribution he was co-owner of Best Record Distributors and Gold Record Distributors. He was also co-owner of Transcontinent Record Sales and Amherst Records. Along with Leonard Silver, he opened a chain of music stores, Record Theater. The record labels he owned included Thunderbird Records.

== Career ==
=== 1960s to 1970s ===
In 1959, Brodie was hired by Scotty Moore as their national promotion man to push Thomas Wayne's song "Tragedy". Brodie said that he could make the song a big hit. Working with Robert Buckalew who was an attorney from Memphis, they persuaded record pressing plants to give them 60 days credit to allow time for royalties to come in. Brodie started off working Buffalo which was his home town. The record started climbing the charts there. Brodie then turned his attention to focus on the bigger markets. By March it was at #8 on the National charts at a million seller. Brodie was paid a nickel per record.

In 1960, he was a music promotor, manager and record producer. He also headed Best Records. Among the acts he managed were Hot Toddies and Larry Hall who had a hit with "Sandy". By June that year, Brodie was working for Fernwood Records. It would eventually get to #5.

Along with partner Leonard Silver he played a major part in making "Wild Weekend" a hit for The Rockin' Rebels. They had the song released on their Marlee Label. Later it was licensed to Swan Records. A year later it was re-discovered by, WNDR DJ Dan Leonard which made it a hit again. In 1965, Brodie had success with "The Hump", a single by The Invictas which he put out on his Sahara label. It was a number one in Miami, it made The Billboard Top 100. Locally it also outsold "Ticket To Ride" by The Beatles.

In 1973, his partnership of Transcontinental Record Sales and Best & Gold Distribution was brought out by Leonard Silver.

=== 1980s to 1990s ===
In 1982, Elvis Wade an Elvis impersonator who Brodie had originally met in Texas in September, 1977 took him to court. Accusing Brodie of not fulfilling a contract, he was awarded $75,000. The claims that Wade made were that he was promised by Brodie, a role in a film, a recording contract, Las Vegas billing, a movie role, television special, and big money. Brodie denied discussing a movie or a TV 2 special. Brodie said that he had spent $61,677 producing and promoting records for Wade which had flopped. He also said that he didn't get any money from the records.

In 1991, he founded Forevermore Records with his nephew Christopher Biehler.

== Thunderbird Records ==
In 1967, Brodie was on the West Coast promoting an act from Buffalo, The Rogues with their single "Say You Love Me". In 1969, The Sir Men had their single, "You're Never Gonna Find Another Love" released on the label. A Hot 100 pick, the master of the single had been acquired from the label by Kama Sutra and released on that label where it became a hit. Another success for the label was in 1970 with "Heat Wave" by The Seven which was released on Thunderbird TH 534. It was on the WOLF chart for seven weeks.

== Death ==
Brodie died of a heart attack on March 15, 2004. He was 77 years of age.

== Production work ==
Singles
Act	Release	Catalogue	Year	Role	Notes #
Wilmer Alexander Jr. And The Dukes	"Living In The U.S.A." / "Get It"	Aphrodisiac APH-269	1971	Producer	
Brad Swanson And His Whispering Organ Sound	"Ragtime '74 (A Tribute To Robert Redford)" / "What'll I Do"	Thunderbird TH550	1974	Producer	
South Orange Mummers Band	"God Bless America" / "Happy Days Are Here Again"	Thunderbird TH 551	1974	Producer	
Wilmer Alexander Jr. & the Dukes	"Give Me One More Chance" / "Get It"	Original Gold OR 502		Executive producer	

Albums
Act	Release	Catalogue	Year	Role	Notes #
Brad Swanson	22 Great Ragtime Hits	Thunderbird THDX 9018–2	1974	Executive producer	2LP
Link Wray And His Ray Men	Jack The Ripper	Forevermore FVRCD-5002	1994	Executive producer	CD
Brad Swanson	22 All-Time Organ Favorites By Brad Swanson and his Whispering Organ Sound	Forevermore – FVRCD 5004		Executive producer	
John Ellison, Soul Brothers Six	The Very Best Of John Ellison And The Soul Brothers Six	Forevermore FVR 5009		Producer	
Various artists	Walk That Walk!	Forevermore – FVR 5010	1995	Producer	CD
