= Daniel Elliott =

Daniel El(l)iot(t) may refer to:

- Dan Elliott (musician) (late 20th. c.), American singer in The Monterays
- Daniel Elliott (filmmaker) (early 21st. c.), winner of European Film Award for Best Short Film
- Daniel Elliott (racing driver) (early 21st. c.), in Australian Formula Ford Championship
- Daniel Giraud Elliot (1835–1915), American zoologist
- Daniel Eliott (1798–1872), Scottish-Indian civil servant
- Daniel Eliot, English politician
- Danny Elliott (footballer), English professional footballer
- Daniel Elliott (Indiana politician), Indiana state representative
- Daniel Elliott (Kentucky politician), Kentucky state representative
- Daniel P. Elliott, an American drag performer also known as Bolivia Carmichaels
