= Southside Story =

Southside Story may refer to:

- Southside Story (Big Mello album), 1996
- Southside Story (compilation), a 2000 New Zealand compilation album
- South Side Story (2007 TV series), a six-part observational documentary series about the South Sydney Rabbitohs
- South Side Story (2014 TV series), a six-part television series on BBC Three

== See also ==
- East Side Story (disambiguation)
- West Side Story (disambiguation)
