= Crest Records =

- Founded: 1954
- Founder: Sylvester Cross
- Defunct: 1963
- Status: Defunct
- Genre: Various
- Country of origin: U.S.
- Location: Hollywood, California

Crest Records was a subsidiary record label of music publisher American Music owned by Sylvester Cross.

== History ==
Crest Records started operating in 1954, released its first records in 1955. Its offices were located at 9109 Sunset Boulevard in Hollywood, California. Crest Records recorded a long list of artists in a wide variety of styles and were more of a pop label, similar to Liberty Records for instance. The label scored a hit with the song Three Stars a tribute record to Buddy Holly, Ritchie Valens and The Big Bopper, written and performed by DJ Tommy Dee. Another hit was Turn Around, Look at Me by Glen Campbell. Crest closed its activities in 1963.

=== Sylvester Cross ===
Sylvester Cross, president of American Music, Inc. published thousands of songs during the 1940s, in most cases for a fee of about $60. Although the company was charging songwriters to record and publish their music, they did have hundreds of hit songs. Sylvester Cross was a real estate developer by trade ran American Music as his secondary business. After his death his wife quickly sold his publishing company to Hill and Range Songs.

== Artists ==
Among the artists who recorded for the label were Jewel Akens, Eddie Cochran, Carol Kaye, Bobby Edwards, Jimmy Bowen, Tom Tall, Donna Loren, Bob Denton, Terry Fell and Glen Campbell.
