= Ron Lauback =

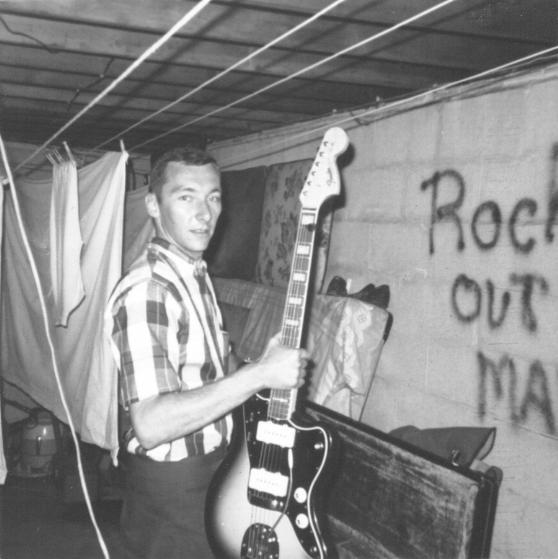
- Guitarist Ron Lauback, circa 1966

Background information
- Born: Ronald George Lauback; September 11, 1942 (age 84)
- Genres: Heavy metal, Instrumental, Hard rock
- Occupations: Songwriter, musician
- Instruments: Lead guitar, Bass guitar, Fender Stratocaster
- Years active: 1958 – present
- Label: 3 Records

Ron Lauback is a guitarist/bassist/songwriter from Syracuse, New York. Ron is currently performing with Dan Elliott and The Monterays and celebrated his fiftieth year in the music business in 2008.

== Beginnings (1942–1958) ==
Ron was born on September 11, 1942, in Syracuse, New York, to George and Helen Lauback. There is a long musical history in the Lauback family (with Ron's mother Helen Lauback being a music teacher in the East Syracuse School District in the 1940s), with young Ron being exposed to jazz, classical and pop music as a child. Ron's first musical instrument was a ukulele, which he started learning in his pre-teens.

It would take the influence of rock and roll in the mid-1950s to make young Ron take up the electric guitar. Early musical influences include Duane Eddy, The Everly Brothers and most importantly Chuck Berry.

By 1958 Ron had formed East Syracuse's first rock and roll band The Sabres. The Sabres specialized in instrumental music and early rock artists like the afore-mentioned Chuck Berry, The Ventures and Dale Hawkins.

== The Sabres years (1958–1964) ==
The Sabres's popularity in the Central New York region prompted them to record a single ("Seaweed" (written by Ron Lauback) b/w "The McCoy" a Ventures song) which received airplay on WNDR radio in 1962 ("Seaweed" was produced by Joe Raposo at Raposo Studios). The Sabres played all the regional teen dances and even backed up Bobby Vee at The Three Rivers Inn one time for DJ Peter C. Cavenaugh The band changed its name to The Jazzmen in 1963, but split the following year. The British Invasion having rendered their Instrumental sound out of fashion.

During this time Ron also graduated from Syracuse University (1964) and took a job with Bristol Laboratories (now known as Bristol-Myers Squibb).

== The Saint and the Sinners (1965–1968)| Airborne (1969–1970) ==
Ron next worked with The Saint and the Sinners (1965–1968) featuring lead singer Tommy Forrest (ex-The Monterays), keyboardist George Day, Si Sifer (drums), Dave Machan (vocals/guitar). The Saint and the Sinners started out as a typical mid 60's garage/dance band before evolving into a soul/horn band, not unlike Wilmer & the Dukes (another regionally popular band). The Saint and the Sinners fought it out with both The Dukes and The Monterays on the local dance circuit.

The band could be seen regularly playing the hip clubs and dances of the era. These places include: Hewitt's, The Pin-O-Rama in Oswego, S.U. frat blasts, Carlsys, The Turn On in Downtown Syracuse, and other local high school dances. It was at this time that the Sinners made their first recordings "LIVE" (naturally) at St. Matthews School in East Syracuse.

The Saint and the Sinners spent summer 1967 as the "virtual" house band of The Forest Hotel in Sylvan Beach, New York. ""The popularity of the band was established when we played all summer at The Forest Hotel," Ron states. "People of that generation still remember us from performing there. Stop in and ask Captain John at his restaurant in Sylvan Beach as to who was one of the best bands to play at the Forest."

Soon after this engagement, the group underwent another split, with George Day leaving (he would later surface in The Monterays.) The Sinners soldiered on, acquiring saxophonist Frank Segroi and organist (and former Campus Walker) Larry Brennan. Ron-"We completely changed our style. Soul music became the popular music of young adults, therefore, we changed with the times. Now since I played trumpet as a youth in high school, it was natural to play dual harmonies with Frank on many of these songs. This was due to the horn charts that were inherent in the music of that time period." With a change in style, came a change in venues, as The Sinners began expanding their base, performing at Italia East (where their second record was made), Bob's Inn in Brewerton, The Turn On, The Red Dog Saloon, Manlius, NY, and more S.U. (Syracuse University) frat parties. "We also played an O.C.C. (Onondaga Community College) commencement" According to Ron Lauback "I got up in line next to the chancellor of the college, and shook hands with the graduating students and wished them good luck."

The Saint and the Sinners continued until summer 1968, when Tommy Forrest left to re-join The Monterays (Frank Sgroi would resurface with The Seven).

After The Saint and the Sinners folded Ron and George Day briefly worked with The Monterays before forming Airborne (1969). This group featured a female lead singer (Karen Franklin) and was even more soul based, but Ron inexplicably left music a year later to devote more time to his family and career. Airborne did record a number of demos that were remastered and given limited release on the 3 Records label in 2000.

== Retirement (1970–1979) ==
Even though Ron "retired" from live performances, he continued to hone his guitar skills, acquiring influences from then current Hard rock, Southern rock and Heavy metal acts like Deep Purple (guitarist Ritchie Blackmore being a seminal influence), Judas Priest, Styx, Blue Öyster Cult, Lynyrd Skynyrd and Rush. Ron began recording his own demos at home and studied the keyboard as well.

== Re-activity (1980–2000) ==
In 1980, old friend (and fellow ex-Sinner) Dave Machan persuaded Ron to perform again, along with vocalist Kathy Monaco this time in a folk based group called Trinity (Ron played bass for this group). Trinity recorded an albums' worth of material at Dayson Studios (owned by George Day and also home to much of the work done by Ron Wray for the History of Syracuse Music releases) which still remains unreleased. Though Trinity was successful on the nightclub scene, Ron wanted to return to the rock music that was his first love, and tried to re-form The Saint and the Sinners which soon changed their name to East Side Story (later East Side). East Side specialized in classic oldies and seventies hard rock. This band lasted (with virtually the same line-up) for fifteen years before folding in 2000. Some of the members of East Side were Graham Daniels (1984–2000), Larry Brennan (1984–2000), Tom DiRenzo (1988–2000), John Mirra (1991–1993; 1997–2000), Earl "the Pearl" Hamilton (formerly of The New York Flyers now with Redline (1994–1997), Dave Machan (1984–1987) and Barry Glisker (1984–1989).

== The Monterays era (2002–present) ==
In January 2002, Dan Elliott invited Ron to take Jack Abert's place in The Monterays. Ron moved from Bass to Lead Guitar with the departure of Dave Moziak in 2005. The Monterays perform around 100 shows a year and are working on a new album.

Ron and his son Ronnie Dark were part of the pit band for East Syracuse-Minoa's production of "Grease" (performed February 9 and 10, 2007)

The Monterays were the lead in band for the 2007 Taste of Syracuse SAMMY (Syracuse Area Music Awards) Pre-Awards Show (held on June 1, 2007)

Also, Ron and The Monterays were one of the featured performers at the Syracuse Nationals (July 21 and 22, 2007). The Monterays performed on the Stan Colella Stage at the New York State Fair

A re-recorded version of "Seaweed" by The RLB was used as the closing theme to Around the Tracks, the auto racing program hosted by Joe Marotta and broadcast on WTLA AM (April 2008 – January 2009).

Ron is the network announcer for his son Ronnie Dark's radio program The Wax Museum with Ronnie Dark, broadcast Sunday nights 7–10 pm on LOVE RADIO WVOA 87.7 FM (and on the internet at http://www.wvoaradio.com/listenonline.html)

The Monterays appeared with Gary Lewis & the Playboys and The Tokens at the Broome County Veterans Arena on August 29, 2009.

The Monterays performed with The Tokens, The Teenagers, The Coasters and The Chiffons as part of the Old School Doo Wop Concert at the Landmark Theater, Syracuse, NY on May 9, 2014.

== Influences and musical gear ==
Ron has had a wide variety of influences over the years. He enjoys the guitar playing of Hank Marvin of The Shadows, Bob Bogle of The Ventures, Ritchie Blackmore (Deep Purple), Gary Moore, Dann Huff (Giant), Danny Gatton, Cub Koda (Brownsville Station) and loves heavy rock music (Lillian Axe, Giant, Alice in Chains and Stone Temple Pilots for instance).

His guitar style has changed somewhat over the years as well. In the 1960s he played Fender Jazzmaster, Gibson ES-335 and Rickenbacker thru Fender and Ampeg Amps. During the hard rock/metal craze of the 1980s Ron wielded Charvel's and Ibanez guitars with Peavey Amplification. From 2005 to 2010 Ron's main axe was a custom-wired Fender Stratocaster (designed by legendary Syracuse musician, the late Dave Pasternack). He uses a combination of Peavey and Fender amps. Ron is a fan of Digitech pedalboards, and has used them widely throughout the nineties and the 2000s. He currently favors Paul Reed Smith and the newly designed Charvel guitars for live performances. Ron uses a specially modified Fender CyberTwin 212 amplifier and a Morley Wah Pedal.

Ron Lauback has influenced many Syracuse-based artists over the years. Dan Elliott has stated in interviews that Ron and The Sabres influenced him to form his first band The Dimensions as well as the helping Jack Abert and John Wisnewski start The Monterays. Other Syracuse talent that Ron has influenced include Shane Prue (ex-Wishpool currently guitarist/songwriter for Broken Down Hero and solo artist), Brian Williams and Dan Wagner (Wagner), Steven Alexander (The Erika DeSocio Band) and Dan Stabile (ex-Distorted Views).

Ron and his son Ronnie Dark record music together under the name RLB. They have recorded seven albums together since 1992 and composed music for the 1999 motion picture The Secret Life of Horace Gimple. Their music has been featured on both The Homegrown Music Radio Network and Soundcheck, which is broadcast on TK99 (99.5fm).

== Non-musical accomplishments ==
Ron Lauback has also made numerous contributions to the field of medicine as well. His work has been published in several academic journals and periodicals.

- Muhammad, Naseem; Tsai, Peter S.; Lauback, Ronald G. (1982). "High-Pressure Liquid Chromatography Assay for Dane Salt Potassium (-)-N-(1-Methoxycarbonylpropene-2yl)-p-hydroxyphenylglycine". Journal of Liquid Chromatography. 5 (7): 1349–1355. doi:10.1080/01483918208067593.
- Lauback, Ronald (1984). "Specific High-Performance Liquid Chromatographic Determination of Ampicillin in Bulks, Injectables, Capsules, and Oral Suspensions by Reverse-Phase Ion-Pair Chromatography". Journal of Liquid Chromatography. 7 (6): 1243–1265. doi:10.1080/01483918408074041.

Ron Lauback retired in July 2014 from Hanford Pharmaceuticals, based out of Syracuse, New York. He was Vice President of Science from 2007 to 2014.
