= Larry Hall (singer) =

American singer (1940–1997)

Lawrence Kendall Hall (June 30, 1940 – September 24, 1997) was an American singer mostly known for his 1959 one-hit wonder song, "Sandy". The disc reached #15 on the Billboard Hot 100 chart and #6 in Canada.

== Background ==
Hall was born in Hamlet, Ohio, a suburb of Cincinnati, Ohio, to Woodrow Burney Hall and Toto Sophia Sizemore Hall. He attended Rancho Alamitos High School in Garden Grove, California in the late 1950s. He appeared on American Bandstand in late 1959 and was seen with a variety of female singers. He married Sharon Lee Hattensty in 1961 and they moved to Pedee, Oregon in 1967. Before they divorced, they had three children: Jennifer (Ginger) Dawn Murphy Haber, born Saturday, July 28, 1962; Toto LaVerne Hall, born Sunday, November 3, 1963; and Larry Damon Hall, born Wednesday, July 14, 1965. He became involved with Barbara Gambetti after his divorce; he and Barbara had a son, Jesse Gambetti, born in 1977. He and his family lived in Pedee; he was a gentleman farmer of a 120-acre (0.49 km^{2}) ranch called the Circle H Ranch for the remainder of his life. He also sang for the rest of his life, joined by his brother Gene at various night clubs in the Willamette Valley and on the Oregon coast, and he was often noted in the Magpie, a local musical news tabloid published in Salem, Oregon. Hall continued to sing and play guitar until his death from cancer on September 24, 1997, in Oregon at the age of 57.

== Career ==
Hall had a few releases on the Strand label. At a stage in his career, Hall was managed by Steve Brodie who also managed The Hot Toddys who were a labelmate. By early 1960, Hall had a single "A Girl Like You" b/w "Rosemary" out on Strand. It was a Spotlight Winner of the Week, although it failed to reach the charts. Another singer, Brian Hyland also had a version of "Rosemary" out which Billboard said could offer some serious competition. Hall's album on the Strand label contains both sides of his first four single releases.

== Singles ==
=== Ever Green Records ===
- "Sandy" / "Lovin Tree" (May 1959)

=== Hot Records ===
- "Sandy" / "Lovin' Tree" (June 1959)

=== Strand Records ===
- "Sandy" / "Lovin' Tree" (October 1959)
- "A Girl Like You" / "Rosemary" (1960)
- "For Every Boy" / "I'll Stay Single" (1960)
- "The Girl I Left Behind" / "Kool Love" (1961)
- "Lips of Wine" / "Rebel Heart" (1961)
- "Ladder Of Love" / "The One You Left Behind" (1961)

== Albums ==
- Sandy And Other Larry Hall Hits, Strand SL 1005 (1960)
