= This Song Is Just for You =

Studio album by Hank Locklin
- Released: May 1963
- Recorded: 1955–1960
- Studio: RCA Victor Studio
- Genre: Country; Nashville Sound
- Label: RCA Camden
- Producer: Chet Atkins; Steve Sholes

Hank Locklin chronology
Hank Locklin (1962)	This Song Is Just for You (1963)	The Ways of Life (1963)

Singles from This Song Is Just for You
- 1. "I Gotta Talk to Your Heart" Released: October 1958; 2. "Border of the Blues" Released: July 1959; 3. "One Step Ahead of My Past" Released: November 1960

This Song Is Just for You is a studio album by American country singer–songwriter Hank Locklin. It was released in May 1963 via RCA Camden records. The project was co-produced by Chet Atkins and Steve Sholes. This Song Is Just for You was Locklin's sixth studio album release and included songs recorded over the span of several years. It was also his second album to be released on the RCA Camden subsidiary label. The record featured four original singles, including the hits "One Step Ahead of My Past" and "Why Baby Why."

== Background and content ==
Hank Locklin signed to RCA Records in 1955 and recorded for three years before his first studio album was issued. Despite a debut album, many of his recordings were left not released or not issued. However, in 1960, he had a major crossover hit single with "Please Help Me, I'm Falling." Its success elevated his career and facilitated the release of a series of albums on RCA and its budget label, RCA Camden. This Song Is Just for You was Locklin's second studio release for the RCA Camden subsidiary.

A total of twelve tracks were included on the album. These tracks were compiled from music recorded between 1955 and 1960 at the RCA Victor Studio in Nashville, Tennessee. The earliest sessions were produced by Steve Sholes. Later sessions were produced by Chet Atkins. The songs included on the album had not been released yet on album, but some appeared as singles. This included "Why Baby Why" and "One Step Ahead of My Past." Also included was a song co-written by Locklin and Lawton Williams called "Paper Face." Another track, "I Gotta Talk to My Heart," was written by George Jones while "You Only Want Me When You're Lonely" was composed by Gene Autry.

== Release and reception ==
Professional ratings
Review scores
Source	Rating
Billboard	Favorable

This Song Is Just for You was released in May 1963 via RCA Camden records. It was Locklin's sixth studio release in his career. It was issued as a vinyl LP, containing six songs on each side of the record. This Song Is Just for You included four songs that had been originally released as singles. Among them was "Why Baby Why," which was first issued in December 1955. It eventually peaked at number nine on the Billboard Hot Country Songs chart in 1956. The last single included was "One Step Ahead of My Past." It was released in November 1960. The song spent 12 weeks on the Billboard country songs chart before peaking at number 12 in February 1961. Following its release, This Song Is Just for You was reviewed favorably by Billboard magazine in their June 1963 issue. Writers called the album's material to be "all winners," highlighting the fact that its "budget price" would please Locklin's fans. "Hank Locklin can always be counted to a goodly share of business, be it single, full-price or low-price album.

== Track listing ==
Side one
No.	Title	Writer(s)	Length
1.	"This Song Is Just for You"	Cecil Harris; Perk Williams	2:40
2.	"One Step Ahead of My Past"	Hal Blair; Don Robertson	2:28
3.	"You Only Want Me When You're Lonely"	Gene Autry; Steve Nelson	2:33
4.	"Second Fiddle"	Roy Drusky	2:26
5.	"Simple Things"	Ruby Harl	2:03
6.	"Border of the Blues"	Frankie Miller; Lawton Williams	1:52

Side two
No.	Title	Writer(s)	Length
1.	"Welcome Home Mr. Blues"	Charles Phipps	2:26
2.	"Paper Face"	Hank Locklin; Slim Williams	2:17
3.	"Why Baby Why"	George Jones; Darrell Edwards	2:22
4.	"I Gotta Talk to Your Heart"	Jones	2:17
5.	"Time Nor Tide"	Glenn Spencer; Charlie Wilkins	2:12
6.	"The Other Side of the Door"	Leon Carr; Fred Tobias	2:00

== Personnel ==
All credits are adapted from the liner notes of This Song Is Just for You.

Musical personnel

- Chet Atkins – guitar
- Floyd Cramer – piano
- Jimmy Day – steel guitar
- Ray Edenton – rhythm guitar
- Buddy Harman – drums
- Hank Garland – guitar
- Tommy Jackson – fiddle
- The Jordanaires – background vocals
- Jerry Kennedy – guitar
- The Anita Kerr Singers – background vocals
- Douglas Kirkham – drums
- Grady Martin – guitar
- Bob Moore – bass
- Dale Potter – fiddle
- Jack Shook – rhythm guitar
- Velma Smith – rhythm guitar
- Henry Strzelecki – bass

Technical personnel

- Chet Atkins – producer
- Ethel Gabriel – A&R coordinator
- Steve Sholes – producer

== Release history ==
Region	Date	Format	Label	Ref.
Canada	May 1963	Vinyl	RCA Camden	
United Kingdom	May 1963	Vinyl	RCA Camden	
United States	May 1963	Vinyl	RCA Camden	
