= The Old Bog Road =

Single by Hugo Duncan
- Released: 1973
- Genre: Irish
- Songwriter(s): Teresa Brayton and Madeline King O'Farrelly

"The Old Bog Road" is an Irish song written as a poem by Teresa Brayton, from Kilbrook, County Kildare, and set to music by Madeline King O'Farrelly. The road in question is located near the author's residence in Ferrans (alternative spelling "Ferns") Lock.

== Recordings ==
The song has been recorded by the following artists, among others:

- Ruthie Morrissey
- Mick Moloney
- Willie Brady
- Eileen Donaghy
- Hugo Duncan
- Foster and Allen (on The Ultimate Collection, 2014)
- Finbar Furey
- Anthony Kearns
- Josef Locke
- Hank Locklin
- Johnny McEvoy
- Daniel O'Donnell
- Finbar Wright
