= West Side Story (disambiguation) =

West Side Story is a 1957 American musical.

West Side Story or Westside Story may also refer to:

== Based on the musical ==
- West Side Story (Original Broadway Cast), a 1957 recording
- West Side Story (1961 film), an adaptation directed by Robert Wise and Jerome Robbins
  - West Side Story (1961 soundtrack)
  - West Side Story, a novelization of the film by Irving Shulman
- Leonard Bernstein Conducts West Side Story, a 1985 album featuring Kiri Te Kanawa and José Carreras
- West Side Story (2021 film), an adaptation directed by Steven Spielberg
  - West Side Story (2021 soundtrack)
- West Side Story Suite, a 1995 ballet
- West Side Story (André Previn album) (1959)
- West Side Story (Cal Tjader album) (1962)
- West Side Story (Oscar Peterson Trio album) (1962)
- Kenton's West Side Story, a 1961 album by Stan Kenton
- West Side Story, a 1961 album by Ferrante & Teicher
- West Side Story (Earl Hines album)
- West Side Story, a 1985 album by the Philip Jones Brass Ensemble
- West Side Story: The Original Score, a 2002 album by the Nashville Symphony

== Other uses ==
- Westside Story (The Game album) (2004)
  - "Westside Story" (song)
- Westside Story (5566 album)
  - Westside Story (TV series), a Taiwanese idol drama starring 5566

== See also ==
- East Side Story (disambiguation)
- Southside Story (disambiguation)
- "Upper West Side Story", an episode of "White Collar"
- West Side Stories, a 1994 Jeff Lorber album
- WebSideStory, a web analytics company
