= Teresa Brayton =

Irish poet

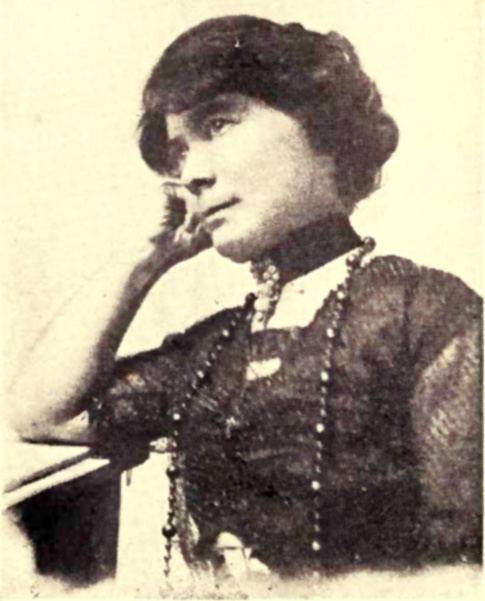
- Portrait of Brayton, 1913
- Born: 29 June 1868; Kilbrook, Kilcock, County Kildare
- Died: 19 August 1943 (aged 75); Kilbrook, County Kildare
- Occupations: Poet; Writer; Nationalist
- Spouse: Richard Henry Brayton
- Writing career
- Pen name: T.B. Kilbrook

Teresa Brayton (29 June 1868 – 19 August 1943; born Teresa Coca Boylan), pen name T.B. Kilbrook, was an Irish republican and poet. She was born in Kilbrook, a small village near Kilcock, County Kildare, Ireland. Brayton was the youngest daughter and fifth child of Hugh Boylan and mother Elizabeth Boylan (née Downes). Her family were long-time nationalists, with her great grandfather previously leading a battalion of pikesmen at the Battle of Prosperous.

She later became a notable member of Irish national parties, the United Irish League and Cumann na mBan. She was described as "a patriot, but never in the vulgar sense a politician" in The Irish Times. She was closely associated with leaders of the 1916 Rising, and wrote poems in honour of Irish patriots including Charles Parnell, Roger Casement and Patrick Pearse.

== Early life ==
Brayton was educated from the age of 5 in Newtown National School. She wrote her first poem at 12 years old, and soon after won her first literary award. Later on, Brayton trained to be a teacher, and then became an assistant teacher to her older sister Elizabeth in the same school she received her education.

Brayton's father was a tenant farmer, and from a young age she witnessed the effects of the land wars in Ireland. She was a supporter of Charles Parnell, the Land League and Home Rule. Her work is largely influenced by her family history and Irish nationalism.

In September 1895, Brayton emigrated to America at the age of 27. She first lived in Boston, Chicago, and later moved to New York. She met Richard H. Brayton, a French-Canadian who worked as an executive in the Municipal Revenue Department, who she then married. She looked after their home and focused on her career as a freelance journalist. Brayton lived in America for 40 years and became well known in Irish-American circles as a prominent figure in the Celtic Fellowship. It was in America that her reputation was established.

== Career ==
In the 1880s, Brayton began her career as a poet, writing poetry for both national and provincial Irish newspapers, including Young Ireland and the King's County Chronicle. Brayton used the pseudonym "T. B. Kilbrook" while contributing to these papers.

Brayton continued writing under the pseudonym until moving to America, where she became an acclaimed writer and continued to contribute to papers including Boston Pilot, New York Monitor and Rosary Magazine. Her target audience was the Irish immigrant population of America. After establishing herself she released her poetry in collections including:

- Songs of Dawn (1913)
- The flame of Ireland (1926)

She made return trips to Ireland regularly and developed a relationship with nationalist peers, and the leaders of the 1916 rising. Upon returning to America, Brayton became an activist for the Irish Republic and participated in organising the distribution of information to the Irish population through pamphlets and public speaking. Her contribution was acknowledged by Countess Markievicz. Her patriotism to Ireland admitted her to the Celtic Fellowship in America, where she shared her poetry at events.

Brayton's best-known poem is The Old Bog Road, which was later set to music by Madeline King O'Farrelly. It has since been recorded and released by many Irish musicians including Finbar Furey, Daniel O'Donnell and Eileen Donaghy, among many others. Many more of Teresa's best-known ballads include, The cuckoo's call, By the old fireside and Takin' tea in Reilly's.

She made her permanent return to Ireland after the death of her husband in 1932 and continued her career as a journalist writing for Irish newspapers and published religious poetry in the volume Christmas verses in 1934. A short story called The new lodger written by Brayton was published by the Catholic Trust Society in 1933. Brayton dedicated much of her work to the exiled Irish living in America, incorporating themes of nostalgia, the familiarity of home and religion throughout her poetry.

== Later life and death ==
She returned to Ireland to live permanently in 1932, at the age of 64, following the death of her husband, Richard. Initially upon moving back to Ireland, she lived for a few years with her sister in Bray, County Wicklow. Brayton then moved to Waterloo Avenue, North Strand, County Dublin. Here, she witnessed the bombing of the North Strand on 31 May 1941 during World War II. Shortly after the bombing, she eventually settled back in Kilbrook, County Kildare where she was born, and she lived there for the rest of her life. She spent a brief period of time in the Edenderry Hospital before her death. During her stay there she became a good friends with Padraig O'Kennedy, the "Leinster Leader", who was able to reveal to her something that was linked to a family member of his. A copy of her Old Bog Road which had been set to music and autographed by her while she was living in the United States. She had it sent to Mr. O'Kennedy's eldest son and on it she wrote the words: "To the boy who sings the Old Bog Road so sweetly". Two years after her return to Kilbrook, on 19 August 1943, Teresa died in the same room where her mother had given birth to her over 75 years previously. Brayton was buried at the Cloncurry cemetery in County Kildare. Her funeral was attended by many, including the then Taoiseach, Eamonn De Valera.

== Legacy ==
From the vivid imagery she speaks of in her poetry, Teresa Brayton, both a poet and a novelist is described by some as "the poet of the homes of Ireland". Such scenes include the vivid imagery of the fireside chats, the sound of her latch lifting as neighbours in to visit at night from her poem "The Old Boreen" and about her home cooking and work from "When the leaves begin to fall". Such images can be compared to most Irish households and can depict a vivid picture to those reading her poetry.

Her poetry leaves a lasting sense of Irish beauty and community. This can be seen in such poems as "A Christmas Blessing" where Teresa speaks of "taking and giving in friendship" during Christmas. Since her death Teresa has continued to keep an audience from overseas from Boston and New York primarily, this Is as a result of the reminder her poems give to Irish exiles of Irish traditions and music which was close to them. one poem of which is "The Old bog Road" which set to music by Madeline King O'Farrelly from Rochfortbridge in county Westmeath. While her poems were more often serious, some portrayed an almost comical undertone tone. In an Irish times article on, Teresa's poetry was also said to have a racy feel to them.
