= Brad Swanson =

- Born: Buffalo, New York
- Instrument: Organ
- Labels: Thunderbird Records

Brad Swanson was an American popular organist based in Western Pennsylvania and New York. His recordings, targeted towards older audiences, were popular jukebox selections and one of his albums made the national Billboard chart.

== Biography ==
Born in Buffalo, New York, Swanson began playing the organ in Olean, New York. He began his professional career at the age of eighteen, touring the country while giving concerts in clubs. In 1948 he was appearing twice daily at The Capitol Hill restaurant in Olean. In the early 1960s Swanson had a radio show entitled Dinner Serenade which broadcast on WKJF. His album Quentin's Theme appeared on Billboard's album charts in October 1969 for two weeks, the highest listing being at position #185. In 1971 he was employed as an organist at the Erie, Pennsylvania Holiday Inn. By that time he had released ten LP records on Thunderbird Records and was active as a promoter for the Music Operators of America.

== Style and influence ==
His marketing tag was "and his Whispering Organ Sound". Swanson played Allen organs, which he would extensively modify. Richard Nixon was reported to be a fan of Swanson's music. In the late 1960s and very early 1970s his singles appeared among the most popular selection in the Midwest for jukeboxes oriented towards "adult" and "oldies" locations. A "Greatest Hits" compilation released on Thunderbird in 1970 was accorded a four-star rating (the highest possible) by Billboard. His recordings were reviewed three decades later as "majestically cheezy."
