= The Ways of Life =

Studio album by Hank Locklin
- Released: July 1963
- Recorded: March 1963
- Studio: RCA Victor Studio
- Genre: Country; Nashville Sound
- Label: RCA Victor
- Producer: Chet Atkins

Hank Locklin chronology
This Song Is Just for You (1963)	The Ways of Life (1963)	Irish Songs, Country Style (1964)

Singles from The Ways of Life
- 1. "We're Gonna Go Fishin'" Released: May 1962

The Ways of Life is a studio album by American country singer–songwriter Hank Locklin. It was released in July 1963 via RCA Victor Records and was produced by Chet Atkins. The Ways of Life was Locklin's seventh studio album in his recording career and contained 12 tracks of new material. Among its songs was the song "We're Gonna Go Fishin'," which became a hit on the American country charts and abroad in the United Kingdom.

== Background and content ==
With the success of his biggest hit, "Please Help Me, I'm Falling," Hank Locklin began having a steady stream of hits in the 1960s. This included songs such as "One Step Ahead of My Past," "Happy Birthday to Me," and "We're Gonna Go Fishin'." The latter hit would be featured on The Ways of Life. The album was mostly recorded in March 1963 and the sessions were held at the RCA Victor Studio in Nashville, Tennessee. The album's sessions were produced by Chet Atkins, who had produced all of Locklin's previous albums for the RCA Victor label. The LP contained a total of 12 tracks, all of which had not been previously released. Included on The Ways of Life was cover versions of hits previously made successful by other country artists. These covers included "Candy Kisses" by George Morgan, "Slowly" by Webb Pierce, "Rosalita" by Al Dexter and "Kentucky Waltz" by Bill Monroe.

== Release and reception ==
Professional ratings
Review scores
Source	Rating
Allmusic	3.5/5 stars

The Ways of Life was released in July 1963 via RCA Victor Records and was Locklin's seventh studio recording. The LP was distributed as a vinyl record, containing six songs on either side. The LP's only single, "We're Gonna Go Fishin'," had been released in May 1962. It spent a total of 11 weeks on the Billboard Hot Country and Western Sides chart before reaching number 14 in August 1962. It was also Locklin's third charting single in the United Kingdom, where it peaked at number 18 around the same time.

The Ways of Life later received positive reception from Bruce Eder of Allmusic, who reviewed the LP. Eder described the album as an array of songs that are "mostly sad and ironic quirks." He also praised Locklin's singing and the production of the album. He concluded by discussing its positives and negatives: "There might be a little energy lacking in the overall release, but the crisp, precise playing and Locklin's excellent singing (with fine and restrained vocal chorus accompaniment) just about make up for it."

== Track listing ==
Side one
No.	Title	Writer(s)	Length
1.	"We're Gonna Go Fishin'"	Tex Atchinson	2:05
2.	"Kentucky Waltz"	Bill Monroe	2:24
3.	"Slowly"	Tommy Hill; Webb Pierce	1:59
4.	"Bumming Around"	Peter Graves	2:31
5.	"They'll Never Take Her Love from Me"	Leon Payne	2:20
6.	"Rosalita"	Al Dexter	1:48

Side two
No.	Title	Writer(s)	Length
1.	"Too Close to Her (And Too Far from You)"	Cindy Walker	2:37
2.	"Mansion on the Hill"	Fred Rose; Hank Williams	2:26
3.	"Heading Down the Wrong Highway"	Ted Daffan	2:14
4.	"A Little Bit Lonesome"	Walker	2:06
5.	"Candy Kisses"	George Morgan	2:31
6.	"I Love You Because"	Payne	2:09

== Personnel ==
All credits are adapted from the liner notes of The Ways of Life.

Musical personnel

- Kenneth Buttrey – drums
- Fred Carter Jr. – guitar
- Floyd Cramer – piano
- Ray Edenton – guitar
- Louis Dunn – drums
- The Jordanaires – background vocals
- Jerry Kennedy – guitar
- The Anita Kerr Singers – background vocals
- Buddy Harman – drums
- Roy Huskey – bass
- Grady Martin – guitar
- Bob Moore – bass
- Velma Smith – guitar
- Henry Strzelecki – bass
- Joseph Tanner – guitar

Technical personnel

- Chet Atkins – producer
- Bill Porter – engineer
- Lawton Williams – liner notes

== Release history ==
Region	Date	Format	Label	Ref.
Canada	July 1963	Vinyl	RCA Victor	
Germany	July 1963	Vinyl	RCA Victor	
United States	July 1963	Vinyl	RCA Victor	
