= The Seven (band) =

American rock group

- Also known as: The Magnificent Seven, Magnificent Seven
- Years active: Late 1960s to early 1970s
- Labels: Thunderbird; EMI Italiana S.p.A.

The Seven were a rock group from Syracuse, New York. They had regional hits with "Heat Wave" and "Tell Her No". They were a rock group with elements of jazz and funk.

== Background ==
An Upstate New York act, the group's roots go back to an outfit called The Upsetters. They were made up of members from Jeff & The Notes and Jimmy Cavallo & The Houserockers, etc.. Guitarist John Latocha left the group and was replaced by Bob Canastraro. They then changed their name to The Magnificent Seven and carried on for about a year until Canastraro was replaced by Chuck Wheeler from a group called Surprise Package. The group then just went by the name, The Seven. Between 1969 & 1972 they were a very popular and well listened to group. The venues the played at included The Place, Campus Inn, Captain Mac's, Ungano's, The Bitter End and The Shack. Their sound has been described as one with heavy rhythm, blasting brass, Latin undercurrents and similar to Blood Sweat & Tears through to Santana.

== Career ==
By the beginning of 1970, the group had already played at the Bitter End in New York, Gilligan's in Buffalo, the Aerodrome in Schenectady and The Club in Rochester. An article in the January 3 issue of Record World said that the band was in town to cut their first single. The four songs to be recorded were "Song" and "Rachel, both of them originals. The other two were "Heat Wave" which was a hit for Martha and the Vandellas and "Tell Her No" which was a hit for The Zombies.

In January 1970, their single, "The Song" was released on Thunderbird TH 534. It was the B side "Heat Wave" which became the hit and that charted for seven weeks on WOLF Radio.

By May, their new album, the song is SONG the album is ALBUM was released on Thunderbird THS 9006 and received a positive reception. It was just after the album was cut that group member Frank Sgroi contacted Tommy Forest. Sgroi and Forest had played together in a group called Saints And Sinners. He said to Forest that they had got rid of their lead singer and were auditioning lead singers. Forest who was in The Monterays didn't want to leave the group but was happy to come and play a few songs with them. So he did that and sang and played with them for an hour, but the next morning he got a call from Chuck Mellone asking him if he wanted to join the group. So in May, and with new member Forest, they had recently made their debut at Ugano's club and played there for three nights. Among the songs they performed were Rachel" and "Girl, Girl which were from their album. The reviews on their club performance were good with the Record World reviewer saying "though a bit overpowering in intensity, was both innovative and sharp", and Billboard complementing the vocals. The group had another regional hit with "Tell Her No" which from July, 1970 spent ten weeks on the WOLF chart.

According to Tommy Forest in an interview, the group was supposed to go to England for a thirty day tour and as part of their tour, open a show for The Moody Blues. They also had recording time set up for our second album. Chuck Wheeler the lead guitarist wasn't paid royalties he was owed and left the band. They tried to replace him with a temporary solution but it didn't work out and the group broke up in 1971.

The last recording they made was "Junkyard". It wasn't finished off professionally, but would years later be included on the History of Syracuse album series.

== Later years ==
Some time after the break up of The Seven around 1971 / 1972, Tommy Forest joined the Wilkesbury Brigade which became his last significant musical venture.

With his experience in audio engineering, Chuck Mellone assisted with the debut for radio WCNY-FM on December 4, 1971. Some years later he moved to Los Angeles and worked for A&M Records as a studio engineer. In California, the artists he worked with included Hoyt Axton, Glen Campbell and the group, New Riders of the Purple Sage.

In September 2010, John Latocha and Chuck Sgroi were in the State Street Band backing Jimmy Cavallo.

Nick Russo died on October 1, 2010, at 69 and Chuck Mellone died in Malibu, California, on April 7, 2011. He was 68.

== Members ==
- Bob Canastraro (Magnificent Seven member)
- Tommy Forest
- John Latocha, guitar (Upsetters member)
- Tony Licamele, drums
- Chuck Mellone, organ and group leader
- Al Ruscito, Jr., group spokesman, trombone and trumpet
- Nick Russo, singer and percussion
- Chuck Sgroi, bass
- Frank Sgroi, sax
- Chuck Wheeler, guitar

== Discography ==
Singles
Act	Release	Catalogue	Year	Notes #
The Seven	"Song" / "Heat Wave"	Thunderbird TH 527	1970	
The Seven	"Tell Her No" / "Song for My Father"	Thunderbird TH 534	1970	
The Paris Sisters, The Seven*	"I Love How You Love Me" / "Rachael"*	Original Gold OR 508	?	

Albums
Act	Release	Catalogue	Year	Notes #
The Seven	the song is SONG the album is ALBUM	Thunderbird THS 9006	1970	8-Track: TH8 9006; Cassette: THC 9006

Various artist compilation appearances
Release	Catalogue	Year	Credit	Track	Notes #
The History Of Syracuse Music - Volume I	Eceip PSLP 1005		The Magnificent Seven	"Tell Her No"	LP
The History Of Syracuse Music - Volume II	Eceip PSLP 1003		The Seven	"Take It (The Way You Want It)"	LP
The History Of Syracuse Music: Volume III & IV	Eceip ECEIP; PSLP 1007		The seven	"Heatwave", "Junkyard"	LP
History Of Syracuse Music Volume V	Eceip PSLP 1011		The Seven	"Something Times Something Equals Seven" "Song"	LP
The History Of Syracuse Music - Volumes X & XI	Eceip PSLP 1018	1980	The Seven	"Heatwave"	LP
The Syracuse History Of Rock-n-Roll	WSEN 92.1 2D329	1991	The Seven	"Heatwave"	CD
