= Sandy (Larry Hall song) =

Single by Larry Hall

from the album "Sandy" and Other Larry Hall Hits!
- B-side: "Lovin' Tree"
- Released: June 1959
- Genre: Rockabilly
- Length: 2:25
- Label: Ever Green
- Songwriter: Terry Fell

Larry Hall singles chronology
"Sandy" (1959)	"A Girl Like You" (1960)

"Sandy" is a song written by Terry Fell and performed by Larry Hall. It reached #6 in Canada in 1959 and #15 on the U.S. pop chart in 1960. It was featured on his 1960 album "Sandy" and Other Larry Hall Hits!

The song ranked #100 on Billboard magazine's Top 100 singles of 1960.

== Other charting versions ==
- Johnny Crawford released a version of the song as a single in 1964 which reached #108 on the U.S. pop chart and #23 in Canada.

== Other versions ==
- Under the name Johnny Valentine, Fell released a version of the song as the B-side to his 1958 single "Angel on a Cloud".
- Craig Douglas released a version of the song as the B-side to his 1960 single "Pretty Blue Eyes".
