= Bobby Edwards =

American country singer (1926–2012)

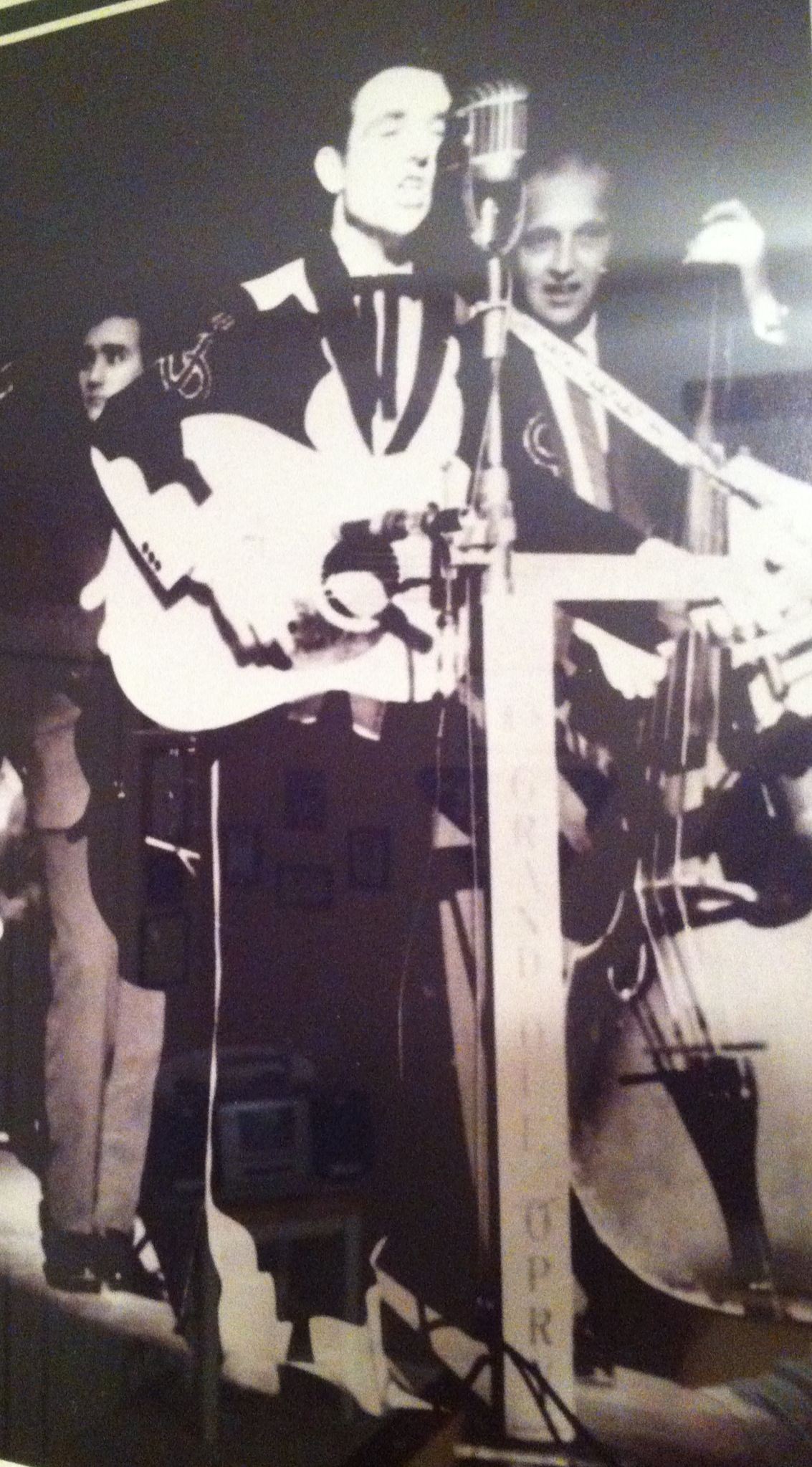

Background information
- Birth name: Robert Edward Moncrief
- Also known as: Bobby Moncrief
- Born: January 18, 1926; Anniston, Alabama, U.S.
- Died: July 31, 2012 (age 86); Murfreesboro, Tennessee, U.S.
- Genres: Country
- Occupation: Singer-songwriter
- Years active: 1959–1964
- Labels: Crest, Capitol
- Formerly of: The Four Young Men

Bobby Edwards (born Robert Edward Moncrief; January 18, 1926 – July 31, 2012) was an American country music singer who recorded between 1959 and 1969. At the beginning of his career he performed and recorded under the name Bobby Moncrief. Then, having completed his service in the US Navy, he started recording as Bobby Edwards.

== Biography ==
Edwards was born in Anniston, Alabama to a preacher, George Thomas Moncrief and Ila Eva Murray Moncrief.

As Bobby Moncrief, he first recorded for Pappy Daily at 'D' Records in 1958. His first recording was called "Long Gone Daddy". In 1959, he revived Tex Ritter's 1945 hit, written by Jenny Lou Carson, "Jealous Heart"; the record was issued on the Bluebonnet label. Then Edwards went out west, working shows on his own in southern California before songwriter Terry Fell placed him on Crest Records, and helped produce and arrange "You're the Reason." Though Edwards wrote the song, his manager and financier Fred Henley and Terry Fell received writing credits.

Darrell Cotton, Gib Guilbeau, and Ernie Williams had formed a trio, Darrell, Gib & Ernie. Then, the trio released the singles "I Goof" and "Just or Unjust", which became local hits. After adding Wayne Moore, they became The Four Young Men, which Edwards then joined to become Bobby Edwards & The Four Young Men. Their first record together was the Crest Records single "You're the Reason". In 1961, the song became a nationwide U.S. hit, peaking at No. 4 on the Billboard country chart and No. 11 on the Billboard Hot 100. The tune was later covered by Joe South and Hank Locklin. Edwards then transferred to Capitol Records and released the sound-alike "What's the Reason", which peaked at No. 71 the following year. In 1963, his single "Don't Pretend" made the Billboard country chart (No. 23), being his last single to enter the country chart. In the late 1960s, he operated a small recording studio. In the early 1970s, he also recorded several gospel albums. Edwards completely retired from the music industry in 1972 and returned to Anniston to raise a family.

Edwards lived in Smyrna, Tennessee from 2000 until his death. He died on July 31, 2012, at the Middle Tennessee Medical Center in Murfreesboro. He was 86.

== Singles ==
Year	Single	Chart Positions	
Year	Single	US Country	US
1961	"You're the Reason"	4	11
1962	"What's the Reason"	—	71
1963	"Don't Pretend"	23	—
