= Brackaville =

Village and townland in County Tyrone, Northern Ireland

Coordinates: 54.541°N 6.700°W

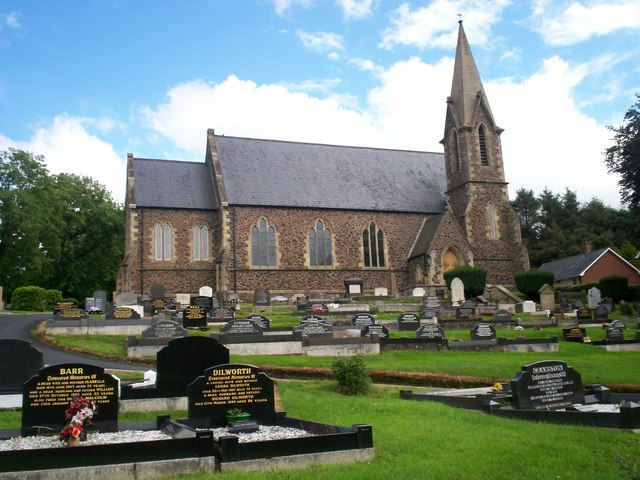
Bracaville Holy Trinity Church

Brackaville or Bracaville (possibly from Irish Bréachmhaoil, meaning 'wolf hill') is a village and townland near Coalisland in County Tyrone, Northern Ireland. It is situated in the historic barony of Dungannon Middle and the civil parish of Donaghenry and covers an area of 235 acres on the western side of Lough Neagh.

The population of the townland increased overall during the 19th century:

Year	1841	1851	1861	1871	1881	1891
Population	278	399	371	510	482	360
Houses	56	69	80	106	104	84

The townland contains one Scheduled Historic Monument: Coalisland Works Chimneys (4), (also in Annagher townland) (grid ref: H4829 6657)

== Sport ==
Brackaville is the home of the Gaelic Athletic Association football club Brackaville Owen Roes GFC, which became 2012 Tyrone Junior Football Champions in December 2012 after a 16-year gap.

== Notable people ==
- Eileen Donaghy (1930–2008), traditional singer

== See also ==
- List of townlands of County Tyrone
