= Eddie Zack =

American singer

- Born: Edward Adrian Zackarian; January 22, 1922; Providence, Rhode Island, US
- Died: January 9, 2002 (aged 79) Providence, Rhode Island, US
- Genres: Rockabilly; Country
- Occupation(s): Musician, songwriter
- Instrument(s): Vocals, guitar
- Years active: 1938-2000

Edward Adrian Zackarian (January 2, 1922 – January 9, 2002) was an American country music artist. Zack was primarily known for his appearances on various radio shows.

== Life ==
Zack was born in 1922 in Rhode Island and first sang at the age of 16 with his brother Richie, who should start a career later under the stage name "Cousin Richie".

In 1939 Zack founded The Dude Ranchers. By 1948 Zack had released his first record, and in 1951 signed a contract with Decca Records. In 1953 he moved to Columbia Records. Some titles were "You Knew Me When You Were Lonely", "Cryin 'Tears" and "I'm Gonna Roll And Rock", many of which were recorded together with brother Richie.

Eddie Zack died in 2002 after an operation, at the age of 79.
