= Eileen Donaghy =

Irish traditional singer

- Born: Mary Josephine McNally; 16 July 1930; Coalisland, County Tyrone, Northern Ireland
- Died: 26 October 2008 (aged 78)
- Occupation: Singer

Eileen Donaghy (16 July 1930 – 26 October 2008) was an Irish traditional singer. Donaghy was well known for her recordings of ballads such as The Oul Lammas Fair and My Lagan Love and was known as the "First Lady of the Moy".

Eileen Donaghy was born Mary Josephine McNally in Brackaville, Coalisland, County Tyrone. Her family always called her "Maisie". She was the second of three children and the elder daughter of Hugh Patrick and Brigid (née Corey) McNally. She left school at 14 and worked as a darner in Derryvale weaving factory. She was a member of a variety group that performed in local halls.

Donaghy married Tyrone footballer Pat Donaghy in 1956. The couple lived for a while in Coalisland, before moving to Moy. Her big breakthrough was the 1958 Ulster Football Final at Clones, where she sang "The Boys from the County Armagh" to a packed stadium.

She toured the world as part of the traditional folk scene in the early 1960s and was successful in Ireland, the UK, New Zealand, Australia, the US and Canada. One of her albums, Let's Sing with the Irish was issued on Fontana (Philips) Records in the UK and Epic Records in the US simultaneously. In 1971, during "the Troubles", she recorded an album of rebel songs which was released under the name of her grandmother, Brigid Corey. This album was reissued on CD by Outlet Recording Company, before they went defunct in the 1990s.

== Family ==
Pat Donaghy died in 1991; the couple had nine children, including County Tyrone footballers Colm and Plunkett.
