= One Step Ahead of My Past =

Single by Hank Locklin

from the album This Song Is Just for You
- B-side: "Tonjours Moi"
- Released: November 1960
- Recorded: 1960
- Studio: RCA Victor Studio
- Genre: Country; Nashville Sound
- Length: 2:30
- Label: RCA Victor
- Songwriter(s): Hal Blair; Don Robertson
- Producer(s): Chet Atkins

Hank Locklin singles chronology
"Please Help Me, I'm Falling" (1960)	"One Step Ahead of My Past" (1960)	"From Here to There to You" (1961)

"One Step Ahead of My Past" is a song written by Hal Blair and Don Robertson. It was originally recorded by American country singer–songwriter Hank Locklin. In 1960, it was released as a single and became a major hit on the American country chart the following year. It would later be released on Locklin's studio album titled This Song Is Just for You.

== Background and content ==
In 1960, Hank Locklin had the biggest hit single of his career with the song "Please Help Me, I'm Falling." The song became his second to top the country charts and also crossed over into the pop market, becoming a top ten hit there. Its success elevated Locklin's career and he had further fits after the single. "One Step Ahead of My Past" was one of those songs. It was composed by Hal Blair and Don Robertson, both of whom had co-written "Please Help Me, I'm Falling." The song was recorded in 1960 at the RCA Victor Studio, located in Nashville, Tennessee. It was produced by Chet Atkins.

== Release and chart performance ==
"One Step Ahead of My Past" was released as a single in November 1960 on RCA Victor Records. It was Locklin's follow-up single to "Please Help Me, I'm Falling." The single was released as a seven-inch RPM record, containing "One Step Ahead of My Past" as the A-side and "Tonjours Moi" as the B-side. The song spent a total of 12 weeks on the Billboard Hot Country and Western Sides chart, peaking at number 14 in February 1961. It was later released on Locklin's 1963 studio album, This Song Is Just for You.

== Track listing ==
7 inch vinyl single

- "One Step Ahead of My Past" – 2:30
- "Tonjours Moi (Always Me)" – 2:30

== Chart performance ==
Chart (1960–61)	Peak position
US Hot Country Songs (Billboard)	14
