= The Monterays =

American rock band from Syracuse, New York

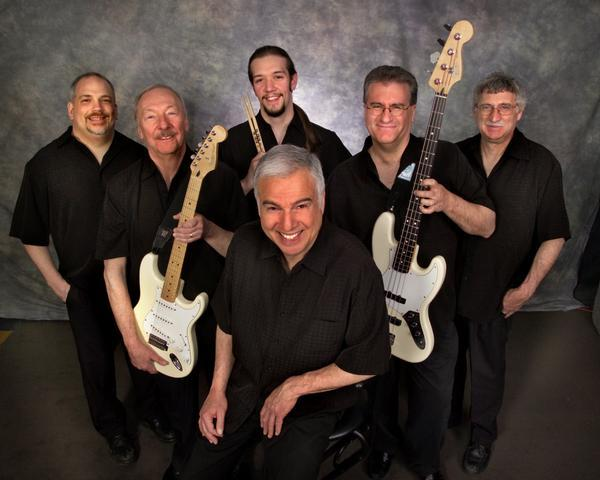

Background information
- Also known as: Dan Elliott and the Monterays (current name)
- Origin: Syracuse, New York, United States
- Genres: Rock & roll
- Years active: 1962—1969, 1978—2019
- Labels: Buff
- Past members: Dan Elliott; Ron Lauback; Ronnie Dark; Wayne Muller; Dave Miller; Jack Abert; John Wisniewski; Larry Landry; George Day; Dave Moziak; Jack Holton; Tommy Forrest; Dave Usiatynksi; Bob Passafume; Joe Pangano; Rich Luzzy; Rance Walters; Terri Wilson; Rob Modugno; Brian Carr; Teddy O (Ted Boileua)
- Website: www.danelliottandthemonterays.com

The Monterays were a rock band from Syracuse, New York, United States. The group was active from 1962 to 1969 and 1978 to 2019.

== History ==
Formed in 1962, The Monterays were well established on the Syracuse scene in the 1960s, and after a decade layoff in the 1970s, continued to play over 100 dates a year.

The band was formed in East Syracuse, New York, by Jack Abert (bass guitar/Hawaiian guitar), John Wisnewski (guitar/vocals), Larry Landry (rhythm guitar) and Jack Holton, who was soon replaced by Tommy Forrest (drums/lead vocals). Early inspirations were The Beach Boys, surf music and the theatrics of East Syracuse's first rock and roll band, The Sabres, featuring the talented lead guitarist Ron Lauback.

The Monterays developed a loyal following with Syracuse teenagers, so much so that they found themselves at Riposo Studios in the fall of 1964 to wax their first single, "Bye Bye", and the Larry Santos penned "Sheryl-ane". ("Sheryl-ane" was also recorded by Utica, New York, act The Madisons for MGM Records in 1965). After this single, the Monterays signed a management deal with "Dandy" Dan Leonard, a disc jockey for WNDR (1965). He was able to arrange another recording sessions for the band, this time in New York City, which resulted in the Larry Santos penned "I'll Be Around" on the A side, with the Madisons on side B. The single was released on the Twin Hit label, and went on to sell 500 copies in Upstate New York.

At this point Landry and Forrest departed (both joined the military) and were replaced by Dan Elliott (née Rubado) (lead vocals) and Dave Moziak (rhythm guitar) (ex-The Dimensions) and drummer Dave Usiatynski (Tommy Forrest took up the lead vocal duties for another Syracuse band The Saint and the Sinners also featuring guitarist Ron Lauback). This is the version of the Monterays that created the most buzz around New York State. Things seemed to be looking up, Dan Leonard booked them into various clubs and live functions (scoring a major coup by getting the band an opening slot on the Beach Boys concert at the Syracuse War Memorial in July 1966).

The third single "Very Last Day" / "You Belong To My Heart" (Sahara Rec. 118) was released in late 1966 and sold about as well the last one. The Monterays scored another coup by wooing away keyboardist George Day from The Saint and the Sinners just in time to record their fourth single "If Wishes Were Horses" / "Conquistador". The single was recorded again at Riposo Studios, produced by Dan Leonard and the A side featured Thomas Bacon on French horn. Released on the tiny Buff Records label, "If Wishes Were Horses" (Buff 323681) took off regionally, and the Monterays soon found themselves on A&M Records's radar. A&M ultimately passed, preferring to sign the band Procol Harum instead ("Conquistador" was written by Procol Harum members Brooker/Reid but recorded by The Monterays first). Without the promotional support of a major label, "If Wishes were Horses" peaked at No. 88 on the Cashbox chart in October 1968.

By this time, the Monterays (Elliott/Abert/Moziak/Wisnewski/Usiatynski/Day) were now a seven piece, with Tommy Forrest returning on vocals. Family and outside interests began to tear the band apart, and The Monterays split in 1969. Dan Elliott resurfaced with the rock band Wilksbury Brigade, before joining The Glenn Miller Orchestra in 1973. A year later, he joined The Belmonts. George Day opened Dayson Studios, recording many top Upstate New York musicians from 1970 to 1987. George Day also became involved with Ron Wray who curated the Syracuse area artists rock and roll album series in the 1970s and 1980s. Tommy Forrest remained active as well, fronting local act The Seven into the early 1970s.

In 1978, The "Wishes"-era Monterays reformed for a one off show at The Beginning club in Syracuse to over two thousand people. But after Dan Elliott left California after finishing work on H.B. Halicki's film The Junkman, he reformed the Monterays permanently. Then called Dan Elliott and the Monterays, they became a mainstay on the Syracuse scene, and recorded a single for the Belmonts-owned AIR Records label ("Stay Awhile" / "Ruby Baby" 1983), and winning a SAMMY (Syracuse Area Music Awards) lifetime achievement award in 1996.

The group has undergone some major changes in recent years, with the departures of Jack Abert in 2002 (Abert stayed on as executive producer and live sound mixer), George Day in 2004, and Dave Moziak in 2005. Ron Lauback joined the band in 2002 first as a replacement for Jack Abert, then switching to lead guitar in 2005 with the departure of Dave Moziak. His son Ronnie Dark was added on drums in 2003. Other members in the 2000s included Rob Medugno on keyboards (2005–2007), Brian Carr (bass/vocals 2005-2011), and Wayne Muller (keyboards 2007–present).

Founding member Jack Abert died on August 16, 2009, in Florida.

Longtime bassist Brian Carr departed in October 2011. The band has reshuffled their line-up again with Ronnie Dark taking over bass guitar duties. Dark's first replacement on drums, Teddy O Ted Boileau left in August 2012.

2012 marked the Monterays' 50th year in the music business.

Dan Elliott died on June 23, 2019. When Elliott died, The Monterays got the blessings of his mother (Concetta) and wife (Carolyn) to keep the name "The Monterays" and keep his memory alive and keep playing.

Ron Lauback, Ronnie Dark, Wayne Muller, & Dave Miller recruited Dave Novak to be the fifth member of The Monterays in January 2020. They play park jobs in Syracuse, New York and surrounding areas.

== Various Monterays lineups ==
- (1962–1965) Jack Abert (bass/Hawaiian guitar/vocals), John Wisnewski (guitar/vocals), Larry Landry (rhythm guitar), Jack Holton (drums) rep-Tommy Forrest (drums/vocals-1962-1965)
- (1965–1969; 1978 reunion) Jack Abert, John Wisnewski, Dan Elliot (vocals), Dave Moziak (guitar/vocals), Dave Usiatynski(drums), George Day (keyboards/vocals-1967-1969), Tommy Forrest (vocals-1968-1969)
- (1982–1984) Jack Abert, John Wisnewski, Dan Elliot, Dave Moziak, George Day, Bob Passafume (lead guitar), Joe Pangaro (drums)
- (1985-early 90s) Jack Abert, John Wisnewski, Dan Elliot, Dave Moziak, George Day (who leave and rejoin the band several times over the next two decades), Bob Passafume, Dave Miller (drums)
- (early 90s-1999) Jack Abert, John Wisnewski, Dan Elliot, Dave Moziak, George Day, Bob Passafume, Rich Luzzy (drums)
- (2000–2001) Jack Abert, John Wisnewski, Dan Elliot, Dave Moziak, George Day, Bob Passafume, Tommy Forrest (drums/vocals)
- (2002–2005) Dan Elliot, Dave Moziak, George Day (left band in summer 2004-replaced by Terri Wilson), Ron Lauback (bass-replaced Jack Abert, who moved to backline-retired in 2006), Tommy Forrest (who departed in 2003-briefly replaced by Rance Walters, followed by Ronnie Dark-2003)
- (2007–2011) Dan Elliot, Ron Lauback, Ronnie Dark, Brian Carr (bass/vocals), Wayne Muller (keyboards, live sound director)
- (January 2012-August 2012) Dan Elliott, Ron Lauback, Ronnie Dark, Wayne Muller, Teddy O (Ted Boileau)
- (September 2012 – June 2019), Dan Elliott, Ron Lauback, Ronnie Dark, Wayne Muller, Dave Miller
- (January 2020 – present) Ron Lauback, Ronnie Dark, Dave Novak, Wayne Muller, Dave Miller
