= Terry Fell =

American singer-songwriter

- Born: May 13, 1921; Dora, Alabama
- Died: April 4, 2007 (aged 85); Madison, Tennessee
- Occupations: singer; songwriter
- Musical career
- Genres: Country; truck-driving country; honky-tonk
- Instruments: Vocals; Guitar
- Years active: 1937–1952
- Labels: Fargo; Memo; Courtney; 4 Star; Gilt-Edge; RCA Victor; Lode; Crest; Sims; Scorpion

Terry Fell (May 13, 1921 – April 4, 2007) was an American country musician. His famous song is "Truck Drivin Man"(1954).

== Biography ==
=== Childhood and adolescence ===
Fell was born in Dora, Alabama on May 13, 1921, and got his first guitar at the age of nine. Later, he learned mandolin and took singing lessons. When he was 13 years old, his father died; three years later, he moved alone to California, where he spent some time in a camp of the Civilian Conservation Corps. After he briefly lived in Alabama again, Fell and his mother moved to the US West Coast. There, he began playing in 1943 as bassist for Merl Lindsay.

=== Musical career ===
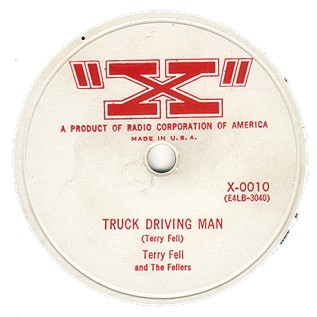
"Truck Drivin Man" record

Fell started his record career in 1945 as a member of Billy Hughes' band, Pals of The Pecos. His first record was with Hughes on the Fargo label. He began his solo career with Memo, then Courtney, 4 Star, and Gilt-Edge Records, although none of his releases became hits there.

During his first session for RCA in Hollywood (1954), he recorded a song that would become a hit. Although the A-side, "Don't Drop It", was underplayed, the B-side, "Truck Drivin Man", became a classic, especially in the trucker country-music scene. In 1955, he made a guest appearance on ABC-TV's Ozark Jubilee.

Fell remained with RCA for the following two years; however, he never produced a single with the same success. RCA extended his contract in 1956. In 1958, he recorded some sides for Lode records. One of them, released under the name "Johnny Valentine," was a song he wrote called "Sandy" which became a No. 15 pop hit for Larry Hall in 1960.

In 1959, he began military service in the U.S. Army and was stationed in West Germany. Along with Elvis Presley, who was at the same time a G.I. stationed in West Germany, he wrote the song "Mississippi River". The single was never released, but the rights were later sold for $30,000 in 1996.

Due to the lack of success and health problems, his career fell short. Later, for a short time, he managed country star Buck Owens and wrote a song in 1961 with Bobby Edwards titled "You're The Reason". In 1962, Fell moved to Nashville, Tennessee, where he was a songwriter for various publishing companies until he retired. Published in 1993 with Bear Family Records, the album Truck Drivin Man was released with his collected RCA works. Terry Gordon noted that it was discontinued in 1998, but revised/reissued again. Because of his achievements in country music, he was inducted into the Alabama Music Hall of Fame.

Fell died on April 4, 2007, in Madison, Tennessee.

== Discography ==
He wrote and recorded a novelty record on the Lode label under the name Brother George Underbrush, called "Green Garden Hose". It was divided into two parts, one on each side. He later released a cassette on Lode that contained several more of his strange musings.

=== Singles ===
All of the Memo, 4 Star, Gilt-Edge, and "X"/RCA singles were published under the name 'Terry Fell & The Fellers'.

Year	Titles	Part #	Notes/Comments
Fargo Records
1945	Paper Heart // You Don't Want Me Any More	1112	as 'Terry Fell & His Red River Rangers'
Memo Records
1946	I've Done All I Know To Do // You Ran Around (While I Was Gone)	3001	
1946	Paper Heart // You Don't Want Me Any More (reissue)	3002	
1946	There's a Gold Moon Shining (On a Blue, Blue Heart) // You're Not Wanted Here	3003	
1946	Mom I'm Coming Home // I'm Glad That It's All Over Now	3004	
Courtney Records
1946	Stop Your Flirting Little Girl // Texas a La Mode (instrumental)	103	as 'Terry Fell & His Seven Southerners'
1946	Ramblin' Oakie // Steeling the Blues (instrumental)	104	with 'Leodie Jackson & His Western Swingsters'
1946	Please My Darling, Think of Me // You Are Tearing My Poor Paper Heart	115	as 'Terry Fell & His Seven Southerners'
1946	Why Should I Feel So Blue // I'm Sorry We Have To Part	116	with 'Leodie Jackson & His Western Swingsters'
1946	Please Tell Me Why // Waiting For a Love Untrue	136	with 'Leodie Jackson & His Western Swingsters'
1946	That Naggin' Wife of Mine // Double Crossing Mama (v: Kenny Williams)	137	with 'Leodie Jackson & His Western Swingsters'
4 Star Records
1947	Paper Heart // You Don't Want Me Any More (reissue)	1160	
1947	I've Done All I Know To Do // You Ran Around (While I Was Gone) (reissue)	1161	
1947	You Are My Sunshine // Will There Be a Light in Your Window	1162	
1947	Rainbow at Midnight // Guess I'm Better Off Without You	1163	
1948	There's a Gold Moon Shining (On a Blue, Blue Heart) // You're Not Wanted Here (reissue)	1206	
1948	Napanee // Little By Little	1211	
1948	Snow Deer // With Another in Your Heart	1212	
1950	Snow Deer // With Another in Your Heart (reissue)	1426	
Gilt-Edge Records
1952	Yesterday // Dreamers Paradise	5071	
1953	Fireball Boogie // I Can Hear You Clucking	5076	
1953	Hillbilly Impersonations (Twelve Famous Singers) // Smoking Cornsilks	5084	
"X" Records (subsidiary of RCA Victor)
1954	Don't Drop It // Truck Driving Man	4X-0010	
1954	Let's Stay Together Till After Christmas // We Wanna See Santa Do the Mambo	4X-0069	
1955	You Don't Give a Hang About Me // Get Aboard My Wagon	4X-0078	
1955	Mississippi River Shuffle / He's in Love With You	4X-0114	
1955	I'm Hot To Trot / Fa-So-La	4X-0149	
RCA Victor Records
1955	I Nearly Go Crazy // That's What I Like	20-6256	
1955	What Am I Worth // That's the Way the Big Ball Bounces	20-6353	
1956	Over and Over // If I Didn't Have You	20-6444	
1956	Wham! Bam! Hot Ziggity Zam // Consolation Prize	20-6515	
1956	I Can Hear You Cluckin' // Don't Do It Joe	20-6621	
1956	Play the Music Louder // Caveman	20-6707	
Lode Records
1958	The Bears Are Taking Over Yellowstone // All Penguins Aren't Catholic	2001	as 'Brother George Underbrush'
1958	Green Garden Hose, Pt. 1 // Green Garden Hose, Pt. 2	2002	as 'Brother George Underbrush'
1958	Angel on a Cloud // Sandy	2003	as 'Johnny Valentine'
1958	Child Bride // Paper Kite	2004	as 'Terry Fell'
Crest Records
1960	Y'all Be Good Now // Who Who's	1071	
Sims Records
1964	If I Could Learn To Love You Less // Music City U.S.A.	192	
RCA Victor Records
1968	I Are a Millionaire // I've Never Been Sober	47-9719	
Scorpion Records
1976	Big Truck Stop in the Sky // Coffee Jim Trucker	SC-0508	

=== Albums/CDs ===
- Truck Driving Man (Bear Family BCD 15762, 1993) all RCA material
- Get Aboard My Wagon (B.A.C.M. CDD 191, 2007) Memo/Gilt-Edge/RCA material
- Ramblin' Oakie (B.A.C.M. CDD 333, 2011) Fargo/Courtney/4 Star material
