= You're the Reason =

1961 single by Bobby Edwards

Single by Bobby Edwards
- B-side: "I'm a Fool for Loving You"
- Released: 1961
- Genre: Country
- Length: 2:35
- Label: Crest
- Songwriter(s): Bobby Edwards, Terry Imes-Fell and Fred Henley

Bobby Edwards singles chronology
"You're the Reason" (1961)	"What's the Reason" (1962)

"You're the Reason" is a song by Bobby Edwards, released as a single in the United States in 1961. The song reached number four on the Hot C&W Sides chart and number 11 on the Hot 100 chart.

== Cover versions ==
The tune has been covered by Arthur Alexander, Gerry and the Pacemakers, Joe South, Johnny Tillotson, Hank Locklin, Hank III and John Fogerty on his album The Blue Ridge Rangers.

== Chart performance ==
=== Bobby Edwards ===
Chart (1961)	Peak position
U.S. Billboard Hot C&W Sides	4
U.S. Billboard Hot 100	11

=== Joe South ===
Chart (1961)	Peak position
U.S. Billboard Hot C&W Sides	16
U.S. Billboard Hot 100	87

=== Hank Locklin ===
Chart (1961)	Peak position
U.S. Billboard Hot C&W Sides	14
U.S. Billboard Hot 100	107

=== Johnny Tillotson ===
Chart (1967)	Peak position
U.S. Billboard Hot Country Singles	48
Canadian RPM Country Tracks	24
